= Final Girl (American Horror Story) =

- American Horror Story episode
- Episode no.: Season 9 Episode 9
- Directed by: John J. Gray
- Written by: Crystal Liu
- Production code: 9ATS09
- Original air date: November 13, 2019
- Running time: 47 minutes

Guest appearances
- Finn Wittrock as Bobby Richter; DeRon Horton as Ray Powell; Lou Taylor Pucci as Jonas Shevoore; Leslie Jordan as Courtney; Tara Karsian as Chef Bertie; Sean Liang as Wide Load; Lily Rabe as Lavinia Richter; Dylan McDermott as Bruce

Episode chronology
| ← Previous "Rest in Pieces" | Next → "Cape Fear" |
- American Horror Story: 1984

"Final Girl" is the ninth and final episode of the ninth season of the anthology television series American Horror Story. It aired on November 13, 2019, on the cable network FX. The episode was written by Crystal Liu, and directed by John J. Gray.

== Plot ==
In 2019, Richter's now-adult son Bobby returns to a decrepit Camp Redwood looking for answers, having been sent checks from an unknown benefactor since childhood. He is met by Montana and Trevor, who explain that Richter disappeared after being dragged into the lake and never returned. They reveal what happened in 1989: to prevent further deaths, Trevor blocks traffic to the Camp Redwood entrance. Margaret shoots him off camp property and leaves him to die, but Brooke appears and helps him onto the grounds so he can return as a ghost. Trevor's ghost then attacks Bruce and kicks him off the grounds to die. The dead counselors determine that the only way to stop Ramirez is to kill him over and over, which they do for thirty years. Back in 2019, Ramirez awakens once again and attacks Bobby; Montana ushers Bobby off the grounds and directs him to the asylum. There he meets Donna, now the director of the asylum, who further elaborates that in 1989, the ghosts brutally murdered Margaret, but not before Brooke seemingly died in a struggle with her. Donna and Bobby trace Bobby's money to a still-alive Brooke, who survived and escaped Camp Redwood with Ray's help. Bobby again returns to Camp Redwood where Margaret's ghost repeatedly attempts to kill him, but he is saved by Richter, Lavinia, and the counselors. Bobby shares a tearful farewell with his family and departs.

== Reception ==
"Final Girl" was watched by 1.08 million people during its original broadcast, and gained a 0.5 ratings share among adults aged 18–49. This episode had the fewest viewers of any finale in the entire series.

The episode received positive reviews from critics, with some considering it to be the series' best finale in years. On the review aggregator Rotten Tomatoes, "Final Girl" holds an 88% approval rating, based on 16 reviews with an average rating of 8.33/10.

Ron Hogan of Den of Geek gave the episode a 4/5, saying, "Moments of sweetness aside, 1984 is a dark comedy at its heart, and like the best '80s slashers, there's no shortage of dramatic practical gore effects and dismemberments. Witness the first time the ghosts fall on Richard Ramirez to hack him to death, or when the ghosts catch up to Margaret and dismember her before throwing her pieces into a wood chipper. [...] All the ghosts wanted, and all anyone wants, is a reason to keep on going, to not sink into malaise and longing. Keeping the devil's personal blade man trapped, watching over Bobby, working to undo the mistakes of the past and build towards a better future? [...] A bloody, nihilistic show about a bloody, nihilistic decade still ends with a little positivity and love." He praised the director of the episode, commenting that "John J. Gray has a little fun with the ghosts this week, having them pop in and out of scenes, and appear in the middle of scenes just off-screen, and by having them move in between Bobby and harm as they chase down an escaped Ramirez", but also Wittrock's performance as he wrote "Credit to Finn Wittrock, who's not given a lot to do in the episode, but when he's called on for the father-son scenes, it's very touching, and his relationships feel honest with the well-meaning ghosts."

Kat Rosenfield of Entertainment Weekly gave the episode an A− rating. She first mentioned how she was pleased by the appearance of Finn Wittrock, saying that "our favorite and most chiseled horror story alum is here to explore the secrets of Camp Redwood." She then wrote and commented how pleased she was by the fates of the final girls, Donna and Brooke, calling them "the finest of the final girls". She also enjoyed the multiple twists of the episode, especially the last one where the Richters appear and save Bobby from Margaret. Rosenfield noted the positive evolution of Montana's character, and the ghosts' attitude in general, noticing that they were "a much friendlier bunch" than before. Overall, Rosenfield really enjoyed the episode, and the season as a whole, commenting that "It’s been a long, strange, exceptionally stabby ride on this season of American Horror Story, but it all ends here."
