= American Horror Story: 1984 =

Ninth season of American Horror Story

- Season 9
- Promotional poster
- Showrunner: Ryan Murphy
- Starring: Emma Roberts; Billie Lourd; Leslie Grossman; Cody Fern; Matthew Morrison; Gus Kenworthy; John Carroll Lynch; Angelica Ross; Zach Villa
- No. of episodes: 9

Release
- Original network: FX
- Original release: September 18 – November 13, 2019

Season chronology
- ← Previous; Apocalypse Next → Double Feature

The ninth season of the American horror anthology television series American Horror Story, subtitled 1984, focuses on the staff of a summer camp reopening after a massacre 14 years prior. It has been described as being heavily influenced by classic slasher films, such as Friday the 13th (1980) and Halloween (1978). The ensemble cast includes Emma Roberts, Billie Lourd, Leslie Grossman, and Cody Fern. The season marks the first to not feature cast mainstays Sarah Paulson and Evan Peters.

The season is connected to Hotel, with a nod to Asylum with the mention of Briarcliff Manor. This cycle also includes the similar "hellmouths" of ghostly properties such as Murder House, Hotel, and Roanoke.

Created by Ryan Murphy and Brad Falchuk for the cable network FX, the series is produced by 20th Century Fox Television. 1984 was broadcast from September 18 to November 13, 2019, consisting of nine episodes.

== Cast and characters ==
=== Main ===
1984 main cast

Emma Roberts

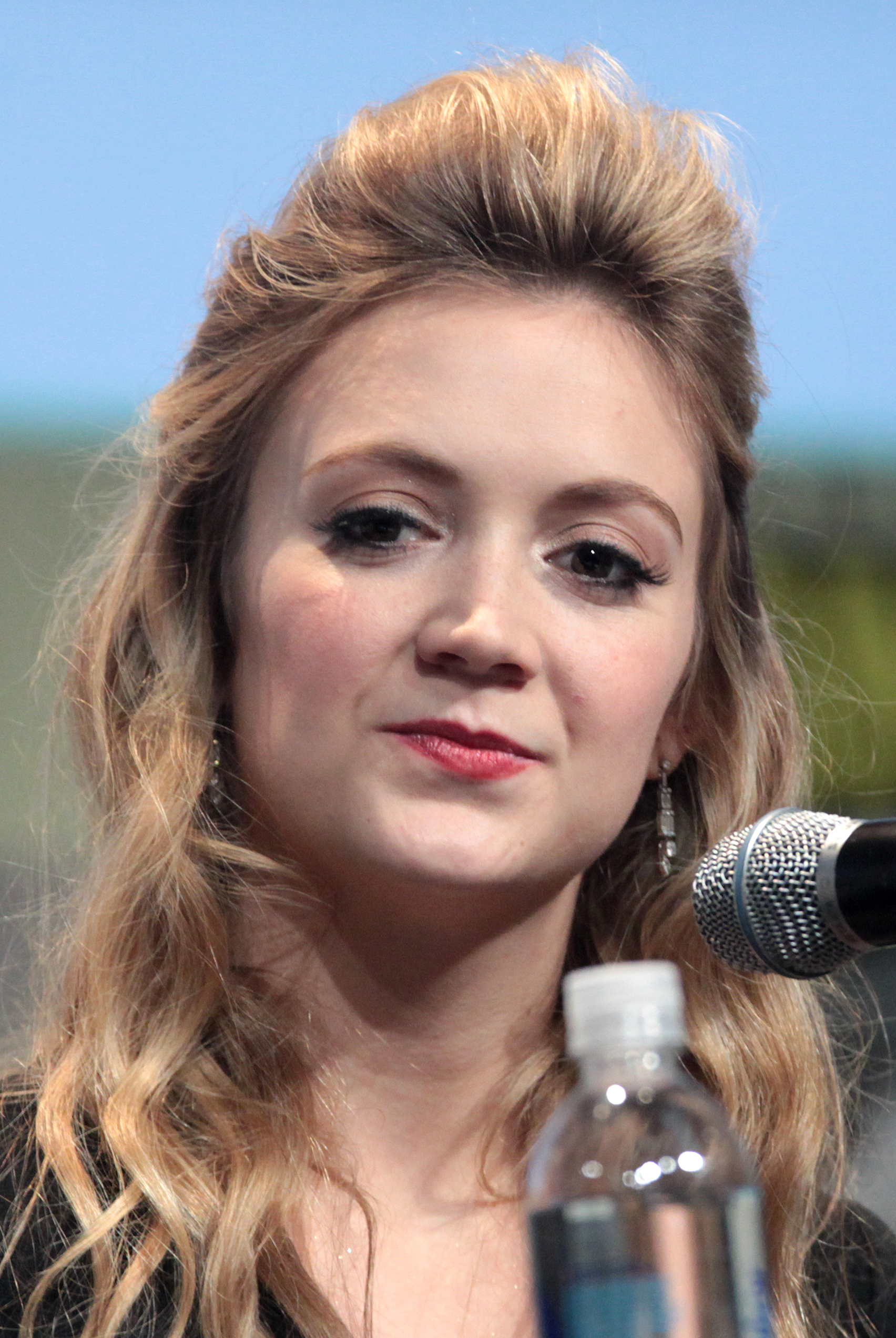
Billie Lourd

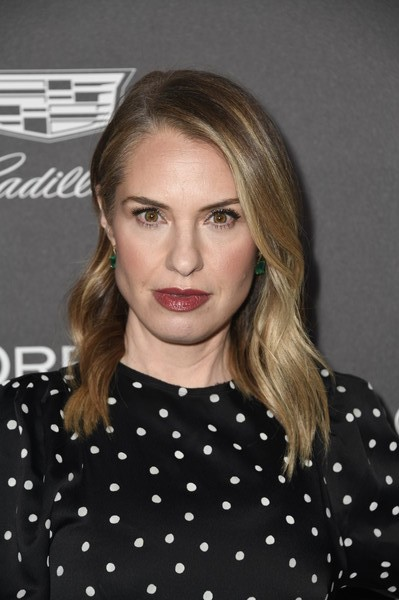
Leslie Grossman

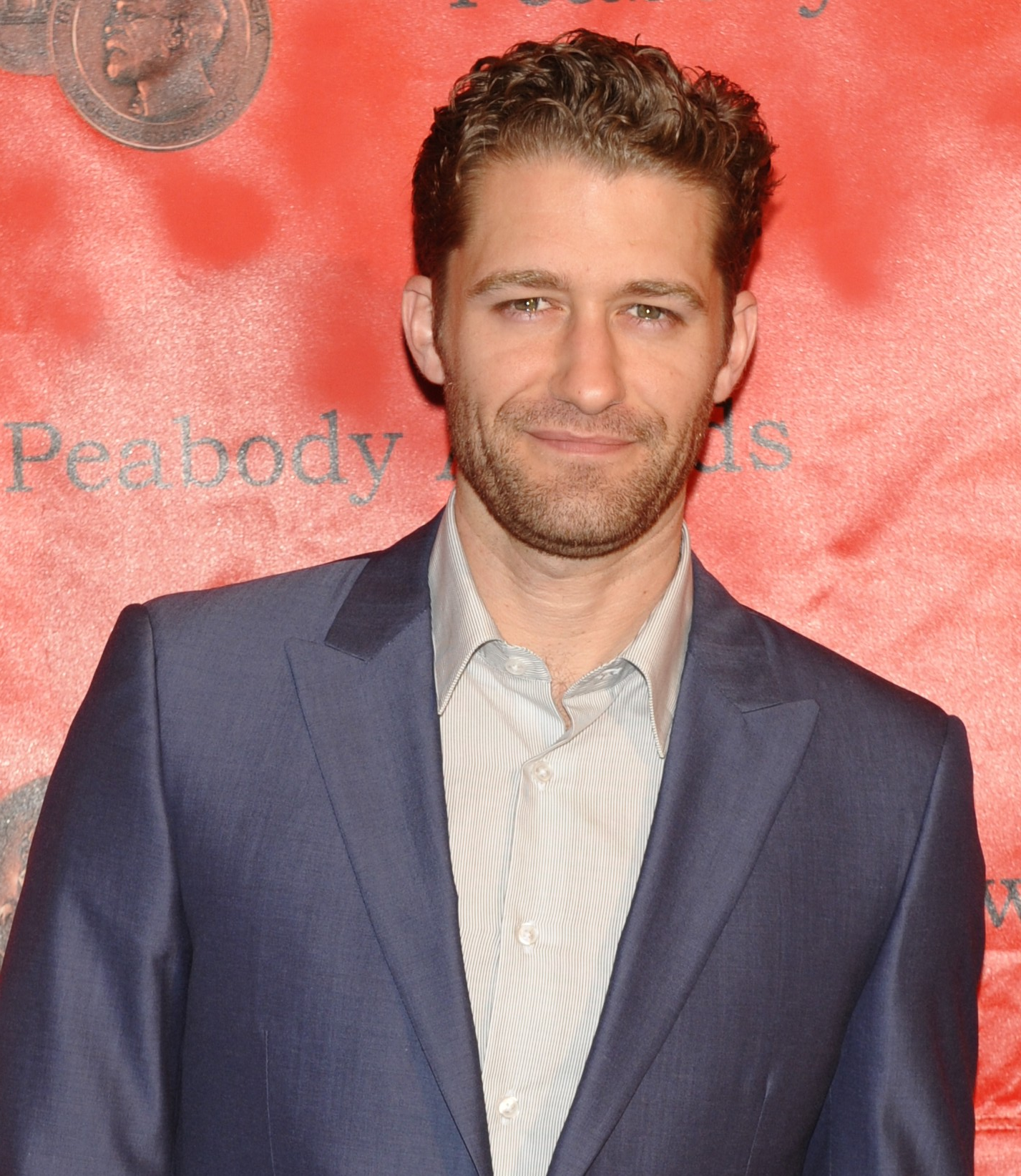
Matthew Morrison

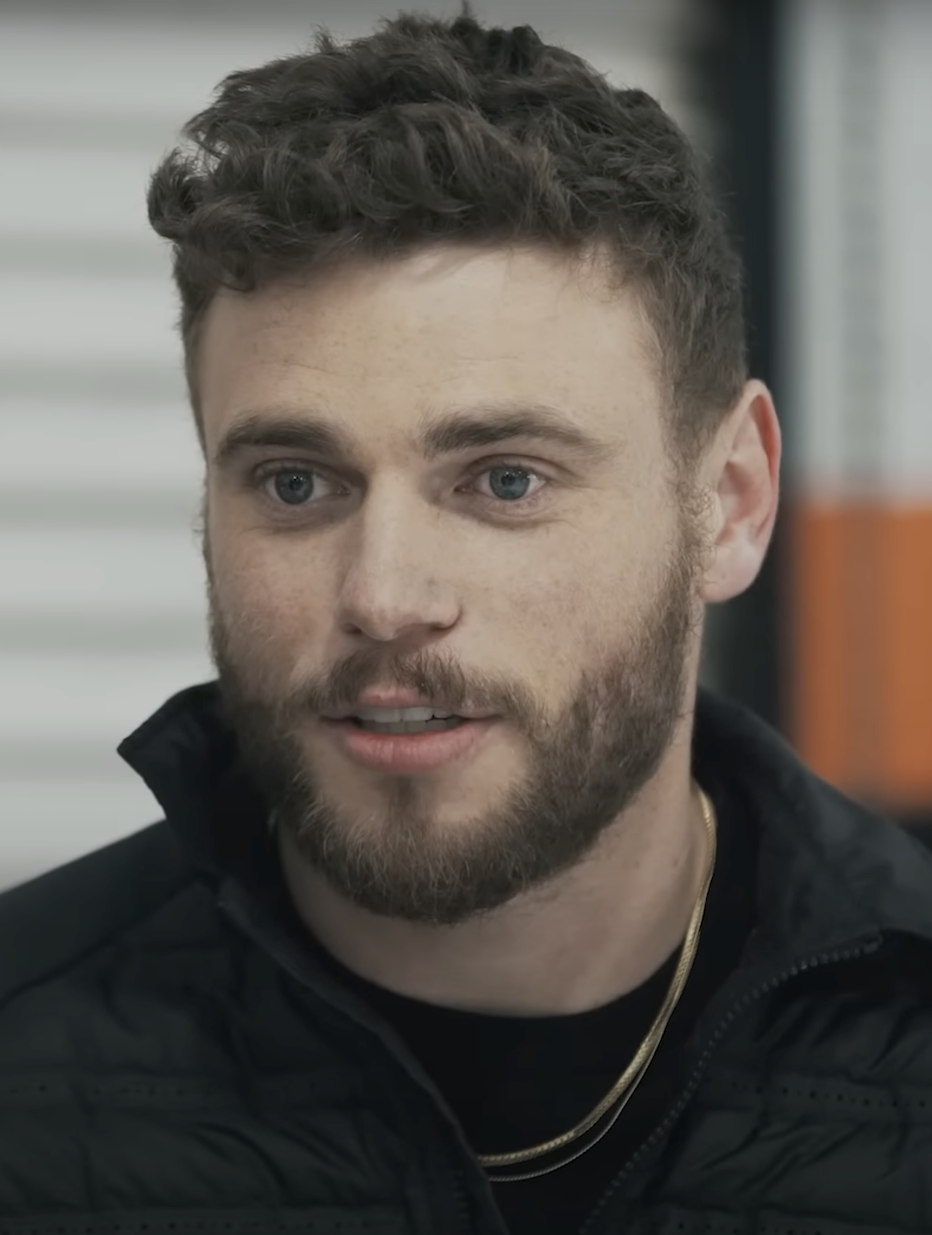
Gus Kenworthy

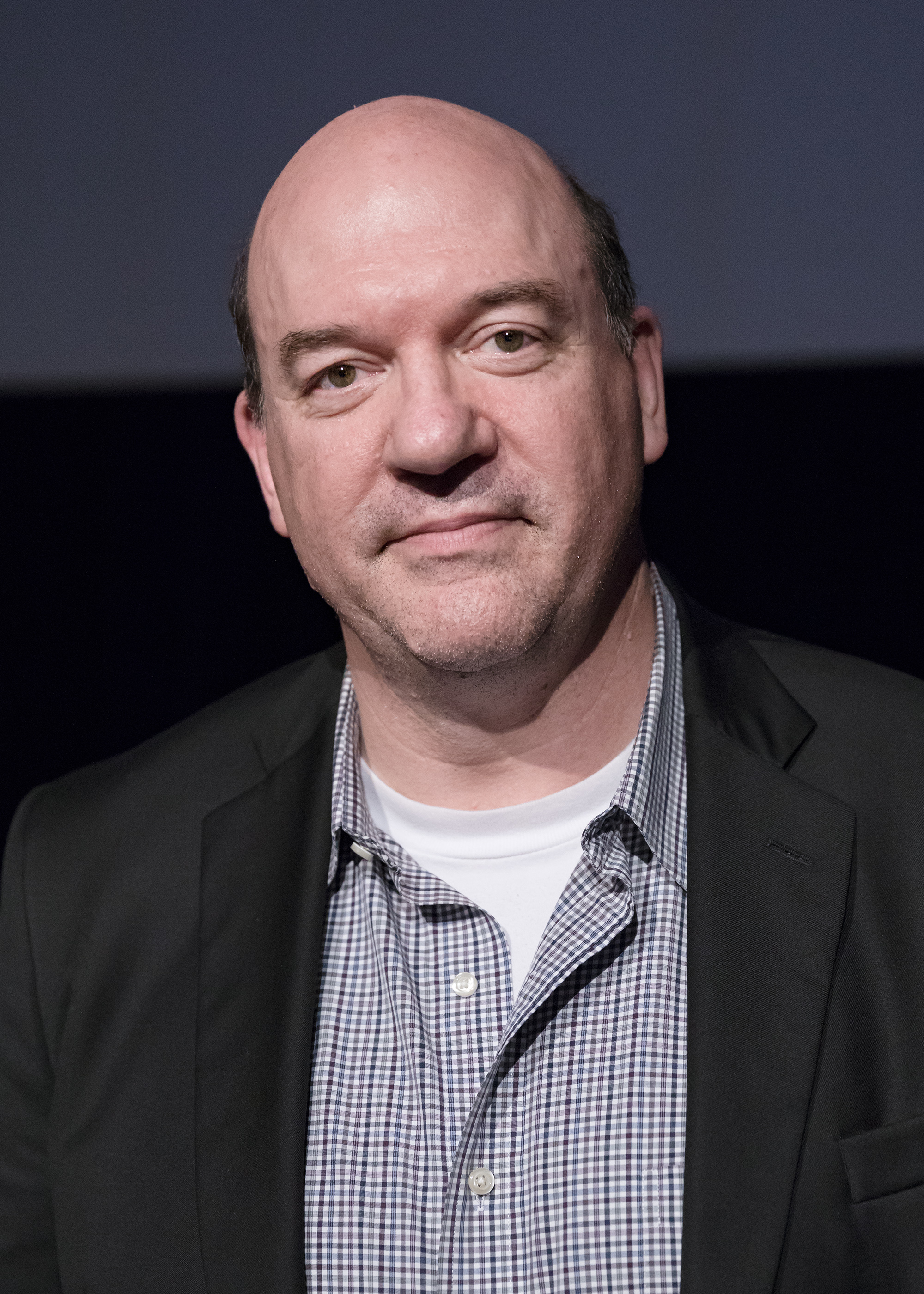
John Carroll Lynch

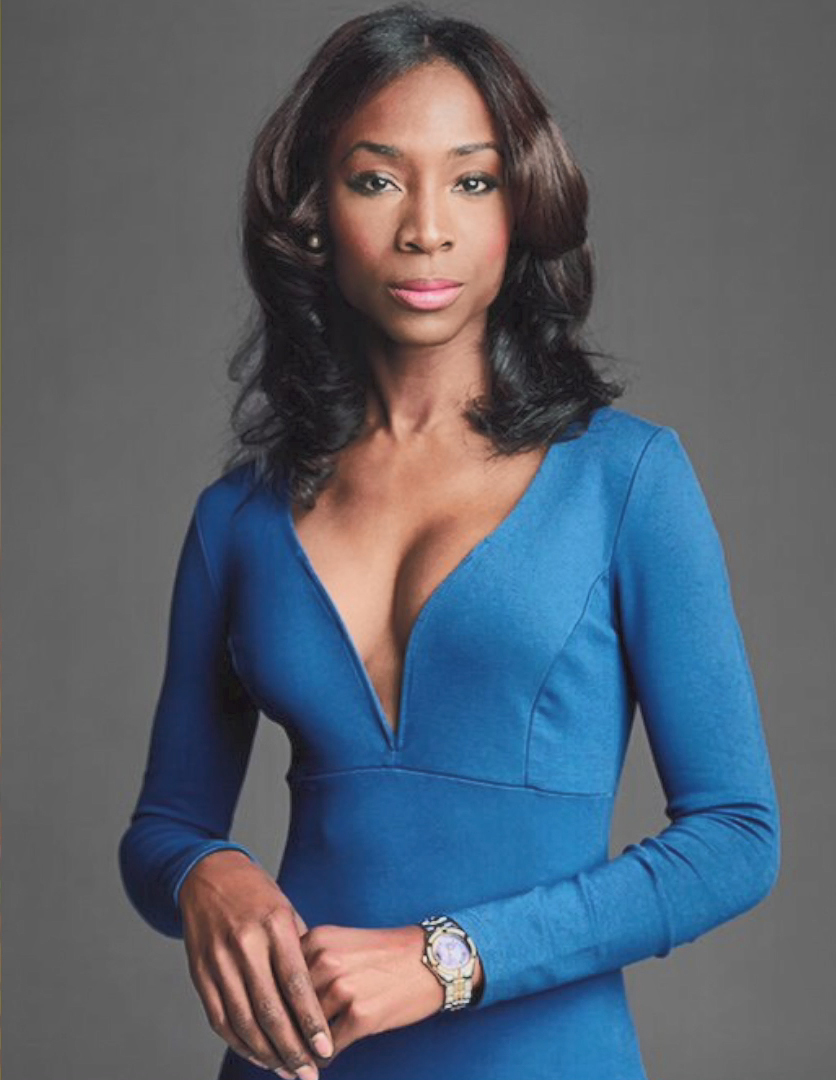
Angelica Ross

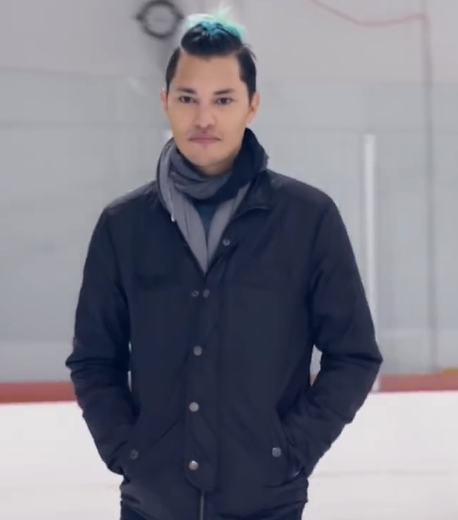
Zach Villa

- Emma Roberts as Brooke Thompson
- Billie Lourd as Montana Duke
- Leslie Grossman as Margaret Booth
- Cody Fern as Xavier Plympton
- Matthew Morrison as Trevor Kirchner
- Gus Kenworthy as Chet Clancy
- John Carroll Lynch as Benjamin Richter / Mr. Jingles
- Angelica Ross as Dr. Donna Chambers (Note: Ross' character was known as Nurse Rita during promotion, but this is revealed to be a stolen identity she uses to work at Camp Redwood.)
- Zach Villa as Richard Ramirez

=== Recurring ===
- DeRon Horton as Ray Powell
- Orla Brady as Dr. Karen Hopple
- Lou Taylor Pucci as Jonas Shevoore
- Tara Karsian as Chef Bertie Clifford
- Leslie Jordan as Courtney
- Lily Rabe as Lavinia Richter
- Dylan McDermott as Bruce

=== Guest stars ===
- Mitch Pileggi as Art Sawyer
- Don Swayze as Ed Gibson
- Todd Stashwick as Blake Carlson
- Steven Culp as John Thompson
- Dreama Walker as Nurse Rita
- Tim Russ as David Chambers
- Tanya Clarke as Lorraine Richter
- Yvonne Zima as Doreen Lioy
- Finn Wittrock as Bobby Richter II

== Episodes ==
No. overall	No. in season	Title	Directed by	Written by	Original release date	Prod. code	US viewers (millions)
95	1	"Camp Redwood"	Bradley Buecker	Ryan Murphy & Brad Falchuk	September 18, 2019	9ATS01	2.13
In 1970 at Camp Redwood, a summer camp in rural California, three teenage camp counselors are about to have a threesome when a serial killer murders them, along with all the other children in the camp. In Los Angeles in 1984, Brooke Thompson is attacked by the Night Stalker and decides to leave town for the summer to work as a counselor at the newly reopened Camp Redwood with her new friends Montana, Xavier, Chet, and Ray. On the way there, they strike a hiker on the road. The group takes him to the camp where the camp nurse, Rita, tends to him. Margaret Booth, the owner of the camp, introduces herself to the counselors and gives them a tour of the grounds. Later, around the campfire, the counselors learn from Rita about the 1970 massacre committed by the groundskeeper, Benjamin Richter, referred to as Mr. Jingles. Margaret reveals that she was the sole survivor of that night. The group also meets Trevor, the activities director, who later goes skinny dipping with Montana. While skinny dipping Montana sees headlights arrive at the camp. At a local insane asylum, a doctor pulling in finds the patients loose on the grounds. As she arrives she is told that Mr. Jingles has escaped. While doing rounds, an orderly finds what appears to be Mr. Jingles hung in his cell. He opens the door to check on him, then is strangled by Mr. Jingles. Mr. Jingles steals the Orderly’s keys. Escaping. He then murders a local auto shop owner. Brooke finds the hiker slain by Mr. Jingles and is chased through the camp, but the body and Richter are nowhere to be found when the others investigate. The Night Stalker is then shown arriving at the camp.
96	2	"Mr. Jingles"	John J. Gray	Tim Minear	September 25, 2019	9ATS02	1.49
Margaret learns of Richter's escape from the mental institution but insists the camp will open as planned. Brooke is shaken after a phone call with Mr. Jingles and opens up to Montana about her disastrous wedding one year prior. Montana attempts to seduce Brooke, leaving her shocked. Xavier is pursued and is pulled into a car by a man named Blake who forced him to act in gay pornography, however Xavier offers Trevor as his replacement. Instead, Blake is killed by Richter. Brooke is chased by the Night Stalker after seeing a body in the lake but overpowers him. The Night Stalker attempts to murder the hiker, who keeps being constantly killed and resurrected. The counselors find Blake's body with his ear severed and assume that Mr. Jingles has found his way to camp and is hunting them down. Margaret is approached by the Night Stalker, who reveals his name is Richard Ramirez and tells her of his childhood trauma. She recruits him to defend and protect the camp from Mr. Jingles. The counselors attempt to escape but must split into two groups to retrieve keys. Margaret meets the hiker and deduces that he is the ghost of a counselor from 1970. Both groups, led by Trevor and Rita, are individually surrounded by someone outside their cabins, banging on the door.
97	3	"Slashdance"	Mary Wigmore	James Wong	October 2, 2019	9ATS03	1.34
Rita's group is accosted by Ramirez, and they decide to split up to increase their odds of survival. Ramirez eventually breaks in and attacks Ray repeatedly, but Chet saves him and they flee. The pair eventually fall into a trap filled with wooden spikes, and Chet is impaled through the shoulder. Ray, after confessing to Chet about an incident in college where he was responsible for the death of a fraternity pledge, leaves Chet to die. The pursuers of Trevor's group turn out to be a group of pranksters impersonating Mr. Jingles as part of a tradition, but Richter kills the pranksters while Trevor, Montana, and Xavier flee. Brooke is left alone with Rita and plans to go and alert the police, but Rita drugs her and reveals herself to be Donna Chambers, a serial killer-obsessed psychologist who orchestrated Richter's escape. Donna drags Brooke away. Richter later kills the real Rita, whose identity Donna assumed. Trevor and Xavier find Chet and rescue him; Trevor incapacitates who he believes is Mr. Jingles, but is just another prankster. Montana and Ray are approached by Ramirez; Ray abandons Montana on Trevor's motorcycle, only to be decapitated by Richter while escaping. Montana and Ramirez kiss.
98	4	"True Killers"	Jennifer Lynch	Jay Beattie	October 9, 2019	9ATS04	1.29
Through flashbacks, it is revealed that Montana and Ramirez became lovers after meeting at Montana's aerobics class, when Ramirez brutally murdered a man who criticized Montana's taste in music. At that time she enlisted Ramirez to murder Brooke as revenge for the death of Montana's brother at Brooke's wedding. In the present, Xavier seeks out Bertie, the camp cook, for assistance, but Richter discovers them. Richter locks Xavier in the oven and turns it on, though a fatally wounded Bertie saves him. Now severely burnt, Xavier mercifully kills Bertie. Brooke, meanwhile, falls into a trap set by Donna. Ramirez tracks Brooke down after being tipped off by Montana, but Richter appears. Ramirez and Richter fight, with Brooke escaping during the chaos and Ramirez apparently being killed. Richter visits Margaret, who reveals she was the actual killer in 1970 following bullying at the hands of the other campers. Richter, blamed for the killings, was subsequently subjected to terrible treatments during his time in the asylum. Margaret shoots Richter and leaves him for dead. Trevor arrives after hearing the gunshots, and Margaret seemingly kills him. Xavier, after encountering a wounded Richter, is found by Brooke. They meet up with Chet, Montana, and Margaret, who lies that Richter killed Trevor. Elsewhere, Donna witnesses Ramirez being revived by a supernatural power.
99	5	"Red Dawn"	Gwyneth Horder-Payton	Dan Dworkin	October 16, 2019	9ATS05	1.09
In 1980, Donna discovers her father is a serial killer of young women shortly before he kills himself, leading to her obsession. Back to the present, Ramirez explains to Donna that he was resurrected by Satan and now knows about everything Donna has done. Meanwhile, Margaret suggests boating across the lake for help, and Chet agrees to go with her. On the lake, Margaret reveals the truth to Chet and then drowns him. Donna finds Xavier and Montana and admits to freeing Richter, incurring Xavier's wrath. She flees and runs into Richter, asking him to kill her to ease her guilt; he refuses. Richter tracks Margaret down but she is saved by Xavier, who is then murdered by Margaret. Ramirez arrives and uses Satan to revive Richter. Brooke encounters Ray's ghost and eventually loses her virginity to him; she discovers Ray is dead when she find his severed head. Brooke returns to Montana for help, who attacks her and admits to hiring Ramirez. As the two struggle, the sun finally rises on the next day and the children arrive at the camp, only to witness Brooke murdering Montana. Brooke is arrested and Margaret frames her for all of her friends' deaths. Montana is resurrected as a ghost and murders a police officer, declaring her intention to live on the campground as a god. Ramirez and Richter steal a police car and drive towards Los Angeles.
100	6	"Episode 100"	Loni Peristere	Ryan Murphy & Brad Falchuk	October 23, 2019	9ATS06	1.35
In 1985, Richter, having grown weary of Ramirez's murderous tendencies, alerts the locals to his presence, giving him the chance to drive away alone and causing Ramirez's arrest. In 1989, the ghosts of Montana and Xavier, still trapped in purgatory on the campgrounds, kill all trespassers, frustrating the ghosts of Ray and the counselors from 1970. Brooke, losing her last appeal, awaits execution on death row. Ramirez unsuccessfully attempts to recruit her as a disciple of Satan. Meanwhile, Margaret is now a rich real estate mogul renovating infamous murder locations, including Briarcliff Manor. Trevor, who survived her murder attempt, has entered a contentious marriage with Margaret amid his threat to expose the truth. Margaret chooses Camp Redwood as her next project, to Chet's ghost's chagrin. A reformed Richter, now going by Donald, lives a quiet life in Alaska with his new wife and son, learns of the project. He returns home one night to find Ramirez, who escaped prison with Satan's help has murdered his wife. Richter gives his son to his sister in-law and leaves, intent on killing Ramirez. Brooke is seemingly executed for the Camp Redwood murders, but Donna, posing as the executioner, saves her.
101	7	"The Lady in White"	Liz Friedlander	John J. Gray	October 30, 2019	9ATS07	1.05
In 1948, at Camp Golden Star (the future Camp Redwood), a young Richter leaves his younger brother Bobby to watch the counselors have sex in the woods. Bobby is accidentally killed by a boat propeller, and Richter's mother Lavinia blames him and the counselors for the death. Back in 1989, Richter returns to Camp Redwood and encounters the counselors' ghosts, who lament that they are being terrorized by another unknown woman's ghost. Richter claims the ghost is Lavinia, whom he was forced to kill in self-defense in 1948 after she committed the first massacre on the grounds. Richter meets with her, and she reveals she manipulated Margaret into committing the 1970 murders to make Richter suffer for Bobby's death. After helping her recover from her near-execution, Donna takes Brooke to a skating rink to relax, where they meet a man named Bruce. After Bruce fixes their car, they agree to give him a ride, but they abandon him on the highway after he reveals he knows Donna and then kills a police officer. Bruce tracks them down and threatens to kill them, but they outsmart him and leave him for dead. As preparations for the music festival on Camp Redwood continue, Ramirez murders Kajagoogoo before they can play. After reaching an understanding with Lavinia, Richter kills himself in order to return as a ghost and exact his revenge on Ramirez.
102	8	"Rest in Pieces"	Gwyneth Horder-Payton	Adam Penn	November 6, 2019	9ATS08	1.05
Shortly before Halloween, Bruce recovers and drives to Camp Redwood, interrupting a fight between Ramirez and Richter's ghost in the process. Ramirez enlists him to help eliminate Richter, eventually learning Richter is a ghost. Donna and Brooke are approached by Stacey Phillips, a tabloid writer who knows their identities, and they take her with them to Camp Redwood. Brooke promises to reveal the true story to Stacey, secretly planning to kill her, but Donna stops her and convinces her to focus on Margaret. Stacey flees, only to be killed by Bruce and Ramirez. Margaret reveals to Bruce and Ramirez her plan to murder the rest of the bands (except Billy Idol) at her festival. Trevor declares his love to Montana's ghost and plans to kill himself to join her, but she pushes him away, guilty about her relationship with Ramirez. The dead counselors, enraged at Richter's past murder spree, tie him up and refuse to allow him to escape to kill Ramirez. Bobby's ghost appears and drags Richter into the lake; he awakens next to Bobby and Lavinia, who convince him to stay with them.
103	9	"Final Girl"	John J. Gray	Crystal Liu	November 13, 2019	9ATS09	1.08
In 2019, Richter's now-adult son Bobby returns to a decrepit Camp Redwood looking for answers, having been sent checks from an unknown benefactor since childhood. He meets Montana and Trevor, who explain that Richter disappeared after being dragged into the lake and never returned. They reveal what happened in 1989: To prevent further deaths, Trevor blocks traffic to the camp's entrance. Margaret shoots him off camp property, leaving him to die. However, Brooke appears and helps him onto the grounds so he can return as a ghost. Trevor's ghost then attacks Bruce and kicks him off the grounds to die. The dead counselors determine that repeatedly killing Ramirez is the only way to stop him, which they do for thirty years. Back in 2019, Ramirez reawakens, manages to escape and attacks Bobby; Montana ushers Bobby off the grounds and directs him to the asylum. There he meets Donna, and learns that in 1989, the ghosts brutally murdered Margaret, who seemingly killed Brooke in a struggle. Donna and Bobby trace Bobby's money to a still-alive Brooke, who survived with Ray's help and lives a quiet life as a wealthy housewife in Oregon. Bobby returns to Camp Redwood where Margaret's ghost repeatedly attempts to kill him, but Richter, Lavinia, and the counselors intervene. Bobby shares a tearful farewell with his family and departs.

== Production ==
=== Development ===
On January 12, 2017, American Horror Story was renewed for a ninth season, with a two-season renewal alongside Apocalypse, set to air in 2019. On April 10, 2019, series co-creator Ryan Murphy announced that the title of the season would be 1984. The season has been described as being heavily influenced by classic horror slasher films such as Friday the 13th, A Nightmare on Elm Street, and Halloween.

On June 24, 2019, FX announced that the season would premiere on September 18, 2019. The official trailer for the season was released on August 26, 2019. On September 12, 2019, Murphy revealed the opening credits for 1984 via his Instagram account. He explained that it was inspired by Corey Vega's fan-made concept, which strongly impressed him. As a result, he invited Vega to work with series veteran collaborator Kyle Cooper on the official sequence. Later that month, FX officially released the promo posters for the season, confirming the main cast's character names.

On October 17, 2019, it was announced that 1984 would conclude with its ninth episode, one less than the 10 episodes that were originally ordered. This makes it the shortest season in the entire series, and the third season after Murder House and Hotel to reduce its original episode count.

=== Casting ===
On February 6, 2019, Murphy revealed that Emma Roberts and series newcomer Gus Kenworthy would star in the season. In July 2019, Angelica Ross announced that she would have a series regular role in the season. Later that month, Billie Lourd, Cody Fern, Leslie Grossman, and John Carroll Lynch were confirmed to be returning to the series, with new cast members Matthew Morrison, DeRon Horton, and Zach Villa. In October 2019, filming pictures confirmed that original cast member Dylan McDermott would appear in the season. Later that month, series veteran Lily Rabe confirmed via her Instagram account that she would appear in the seventh episode of the season. In November 2019, it was confirmed that Finn Wittrock would return for the season finale.

On April 2, 2019, series mainstay Evan Peters, who had starred in all eight previous seasons, announced he would not appear in this season. On May 23, 2019, Billy Eichner, who appeared in Cult and Apocalypse, stated that he would not be returning in the season. On July 8, 2019, it was reported by Deadline Hollywood that Sarah Paulson would have a smaller role in 1984 than in previous seasons, due to her commitments to Murphy's Netflix series Ratched. However, in October 2019, Paulson herself confirmed that she would not appear in 1984 as originally planned.

=== Filming ===
On July 11, 2019, Murphy confirmed the season had begun filming.

== Reception ==
=== Critical response ===
American Horror Story: 1984 received positive reviews. On the review aggregator website Rotten Tomatoes, the season holds an 88% approval rating, with an average rating of 7.45/10, based on 170 reviews. The site's critical consensus reads: "A near-perfect blend of slasher tropes and American Horror Story's trademark twists, 1984 is a bloody good time."

However, the portrayal of Richard Ramirez received criticism, with many, including the families of Ramirez's victims, accusing the show of glamorising him.

American Horror Story season 9: Critical reception by episode
Season 9 (2019): Percentage of positive critics' reviews tracked by the website Rotten Tomatoes

=== Ratings ===
Viewership and ratings per episode of American Horror Story: 1984
No.	Title	Air date	Rating (18–49)	Viewers (millions)	DVR (18–49)	DVR viewers (millions)	Total (18–49)	Total viewers (millions)
1	"Camp Redwood"	September 18, 2019	1.0	2.13	—N/a	—N/a	—N/a	—N/a
2	"Mr. Jingles"	September 25, 2019	0.7	1.49	1.1	2.42	1.8	3.92
3	"Slashdance"	October 2, 2019	0.6	1.34	1.0	2.09	1.6	3.44
4	"True Killers"	October 9, 2019	0.6	1.29	1.0	1.95	1.6	3.25
5	"Red Dawn"	October 16, 2019	0.5	1.09	0.9	1.87	1.4	2.96
6	"Episode 100"	October 23, 2019	0.6	1.35	0.9	1.90	1.5	3.26
7	"The Lady in White"	October 30, 2019	0.5	1.05	0.9	1.88	1.4	2.94
8	"Rest in Pieces"	November 6, 2019	0.5	1.05	0.8	1.76	1.3	2.81
9	"Final Girl"	November 13, 2019	0.5	1.08	1.0	1.97	1.5	3.06

Nielsen Media Research, which records streaming viewership on certain U.S. television screens, reported that American Horror Story: 1984 garnered 297 million minutes of watch time, averaging 33.0 million minutes viewed per episode, between May 1, 2024, and August 31, 2026.

== Accolades ==
Year	Association	Category	Nominee(s)	Result	Ref.
2020	11th Dorian Awards	Campy TV Show of the Year	American Horror Story: 1984	Nominated	
2020	Make-Up Artists and Hair Stylists Guild Awards 2020	Television and New Media Series: Best Period and/or Character Make-Up	Carleigh Herbert, Michael Mekash, Abby Clawson	Nominated	
2020	Make-Up Artists and Hair Stylists Guild Awards 2020	Television and New Media Series: Best Special Make-Up Effects	Michael Mekash, Vincent Van Dyke, Carleigh Herbert	Nominated	
2020	Make-Up Artists and Hair Stylists Guild Awards 2020	Television and New Media Series: Best Period and/or Character Hair Styling	Michelle Ceglia, Analyn Cruz, Taschi Lynell	Nominated	
2020	72nd Primetime Creative Arts Emmy Awards	Outstanding Makeup (Non-Prosthetic)	Carleigh Herbert, Abby Clawson, Melissa "Mo" Meinhart, Lawrence Mercado (for "The Lady in White")	Nominated	
2020	72nd Primetime Creative Arts Emmy Awards	Outstanding Prosthetic Makeup	Michael Mekash, Vincent Van Dyke (for "True Killers")	Nominated	
2020	72nd Primetime Creative Arts Emmy Awards	Outstanding Sound Editing for a Limited Series, Movie, or Special	Gary Megregian, Timothy A. Cleveland, Naaman Haynes, Patrick Hogan, Sam Munoz, David Klotz, Noel Vought (for "Camp Redwood")	Nominated	
2020	72nd Primetime Creative Arts Emmy Awards	Outstanding Sound Mixing for a Limited Series or Movie	Alex Altman, Doug Andham, Joe Earle, Judah Getz (for "Camp Redwood")	Nominated	
2021	ATAA Awards	French Dubbing Adaptation of a series	Nicolas Mourguye, Xavier Varaillon, Libra Films	Won	
2021	Clio Awards	Television/Streaming: Special Shoot Spot/Promo: Horror	American Horror Story: 1984	Bronze	
