= The Lady in White (American Horror Story) =

- American Horror Story episode
- Episode no.: Season 9 Episode 7
- Directed by: Liz Friedlander
- Written by: John J. Gray
- Production code: 9ATS07
- Original air date: October 30, 2019
- Running time: 43 minutes

Guest appearances
- DeRon Horton as Ray Powell; Leslie Jordan as Courtney; Connor Cain as young Benjamin Richter; Sean Liang as Wide Load; Lily Rabe as Lavinia Richter; Dylan McDermott as Bruce

Episode chronology
| ← Previous "Episode 100" | Next → "Rest in Pieces" |
- American Horror Story: 1984

"The Lady in White" is the seventh episode of the ninth season of the anthology television series American Horror Story. Written by John J. Gray and directed by Liz Friedlander, it aired on October 30, 2019, on the cable network FX.

== Plot ==
In 1948, Camp Redwood was known as Golden Star Camp. Lavinia Richter works there as a cook so her sons, Benjamin (Richter) and Bobby can have a fun summer. They go down to the lake to swim, but Benjamin leaves Bobby to watch a lifeguard and counselor have sex. Bobby goes into the lake and is killed by a motor boat propeller. Lavinia is distraught and blames everyone, including Benjamin, for the death of her son.

In 1989, Donna, having faked Brooke's death and rescued her from the prison, tries to care for her, who is skeptical and threatens her for an answer. Donna explains that she is trying to make things right. Brooke sees a newspaper showing Camp Redwood's concert event, and states that she wants to go back and kill Margaret. Donna takes Brooke to a roller rink hoping she can change her mind, but Brooke still wants to go back to the camp. A man named Bruce approaches them and asks for a ride. Donna refuses, but when he fixes her car she reluctantly gives him a ride. During the ride, Bruce unnerves the girls and they pull over. Before Bruce can get out, a police car pulls up behind them. When the cop approaches, Bruce shoots him and the women drive off. Bruce kills the cop and takes his car.

Richter returns to Redwood and is ambushed by his victims, out for revenge for killing them. They bring him to the other ghosts, who are infuriated and demand to know why he has returned to the camp. Richter explains that he came to kill Richard Ramirez in revenge for killing his wife. They tell Richter that they are terrorized by a woman dressed in a white night gown, who chases them. Richter realizes that the woman is his mother and explains that after Bobby's death, Lavinia went insane and slaughtered the staff. When Lavinia grabbed hold of Benjamin, he fatally stabbed her in self-defense. When Xavier guides Richter to an abandoned cabin, Richter enters alone and is greeted by Lavinia. She is disgusted with Richter and it's revealed that she manipulated Margaret into carrying out the 1970 massacre and blaming Richter for the crime. She disappears, leaving a devastated Richter alone in the cabin.

Bruce speeds toward Donna's car and rear ends it, knocking the two unconscious. Brooke awakens in the car with Bruce and he gives her two options: put the car into drive and drag Donna who is tied to the back of the car, or he would shoot her and drag Donna himself. Brooke takes a third option and puts the car into reverse, then shoots Bruce with his own gun. Donna tries to choke him, but Brooke stops her. At Camp Redwood, Kajagoogoo's tour bus arrives. Trevor reunites with Montana's ghost. Donna and Brooke tie Bruce to a road sign and cut off both his thumbs. Brooke then leaves for Redwood and Donna insists that she join her to see things through to the end. During the night, bandleader Limahl is killed by Ramirez, who claims to be collecting their souls due to a deal they made with Satan to become successful. Margaret's assistant, Courtney, walks into the tour bus with a gift basket and finds all the other members of Kajagoogoo dead.

Richter sits on the dock and Lavinia approaches him. She demands that he leave. Richter explains that he has a son named after Bobby. This seems to shock Lavinia and she encourages Richter to kill himself before Ramirez comes to collect his soul. She disappears and Richter kills himself with his knife. His ghost appears, takes the knife, and leaves the dock.

== Reception ==
"The Lady in White" was watched by 1.05 million people during its original broadcast, and gained a 0.5 ratings share among adults aged 18–49.

The episode received largely positive reviews. On the review aggregator Rotten Tomatoes, "The Lady in White" holds a 90% approval rating, based on 10 reviews with an average rating of 7.4/10.

Ron Hogan of Den of Geek gave the episode a 4/5, saying, "That's a [...] brilliant bit of scripting from John J. Gray, who gives both Lily Rabe and John Carroll Lynch a lot of meaty material to work with. Rabe in particular leans into her material hard, and as an AHS veteran, she knows how to play up the campier aspects of her wailing widow character by chewing every bit of scenery she can find and spitting it back aggressively into the face of Lynch, who uses his considerable size to good effect by visibly shrinking in the face of his mother's wrath." He also praised McDermott's character and performance, commenting that he is "great at going from aggressive and confident to a scared, sobbing wreck, and this role plays perfectly into his strengths as an actor." He concluded his review by "People die, people come back, ghosts haunt a campground while thinking up revenge plots, and a one-hit wonder 80's band is slaughtered, and even the most predictable aspects of AHS are still pretty wild when compared to everything else on television."

Kat Rosenfield of Entertainment Weekly gave the episode a B− rating. She praised the return of series veterans Rabe and McDermott, as she started her review by "Familiar faces from AHS seasons past make this episode extra-haunted." She also enjoyed the opening scene/flashback, commenting that the "episode starts strong". While she criticized Brooke's and Donna's nonsense decision of taking Bruce with them, she appreciated the scene where Brooke defends herself against the hitchhiker. Rosenfield also noted how this episode used the same narrative since the beginning of the season, as "everyone converges on the camp, again, and people start dying, again." However, she enjoyed the final scenes between Richter and his mother. Overall, she appreciated the episode but criticized its similarities with Friday the 13th, commenting that it was "more like a blatant rip-off".

Variety's Andrea Reiher gave a positive review, and said "Last week’s episode of American Horror Story took all the 1984 characters and jumped them forward in time by five years. It seemed to be setting up a reunion back at Camp Redwood, which was about to be reopened. But when the seventh episode, entitled "The Lady in White", began, it did so catapulting viewers back in time even further. Because in order to understand where pivotal players are going this season, one must understand from where they came."
