= Mr. Jingles (American Horror Story) =

- American Horror Story episode
- Episode no.: Season 9 Episode 2
- Directed by: John J. Gray
- Written by: Tim Minear
- Production code: 9ATS02
- Original air date: September 25, 2019
- Running time: 40 minutes

Guest appearances
- DeRon Horton as Ray Powell; Orla Brady as Dr. Karen Hopple; Lou Taylor Pucci as Jonas Shevoore; Todd Stashwick as Blake Carlson; Steven Culp as John Thompson; Spencer Neville as Joey Cavanaugh; Alex Livinalli as Julian Ramirez

Episode chronology
← Previous "Camp Redwood"	Next → "Slashdance"
- American Horror Story: 1984

"Mr. Jingles" is the second episode of the ninth season of the anthology television series American Horror Story. It aired on September 25, 2019, on the cable network FX. The episode was written by Tim Minear and directed by John J. Gray.

== Plot ==
Dr. Karen Hopple drives to Camp Redwood to meet with Margaret and explain Benjamin Richter's escape. Margaret does not seem surprised to hear about it, and insists the camp will re-open on schedule. Hopple suffers a blown tire on her return, and a tow truck intercepts her. Initially unaware that Richter is driving, she asks for a tire repair. He drags her out of her vehicle and stabs her in the neck before taking her ear as a souvenir.

Brooke, still shaken from her phone call, hears on the news about a murder at a Red Meadows gas station. Believing it is the attendant they met before, Brooke freaks out, while the other counselors think she is overreacting. Margaret enters and reminds the counselors to go to sleep early, and not to fraternize between genders after dark. She makes a point of reminding the boys to clean away impure thoughts. Montana consoles Brooke, but says that she can not assume that everyone is out to get her. She describes an early experience when she was sent to fat camp and that she should not imagine the worst.

Brooke later confesses that the previous summer, she was going to get married. Her groom Joey Cavanaugh of what she interpreted his jealousy as a sign of how much he loved her. At the altar he exclaimed that he saw his best friend, Sam, enter Brooke's home the night before and did not leave until the morning. They both insist nothing sexual happened, but Joey grabs a gun, killing Sam and Brooke's father, and then himself. Brooke insists that Sam was being kind and that they were simply friends, and is upset that no one ever believes her. Montana says that she believes her, and leans in to kiss Brooke. Brooke recoils and says that she needs air, walking away.

Trevor describes to the boys his experience with Montana, as they walk towards the showers. Xavier leaves to get his towel and is grabbed and pulled into the back of a car, where his former agent Blake confronts him. Blake, who found him via his forwarding address, had previously coaxed Xavier into acting in gay porn in exchange for getting him off the streets and off drugs. Blake is now using the porn video to blackmail him into acting in more pornos. Xavier insisting that he's not gay, offers to find a replacement and leads him to Trevor in the shower, who is talking with Ray and Chet. Xavier leaves while Blake observes via a peephole, only to be impaled through the head by Richter.

Brooke sits on the pier and finds a dead body floating towards her feet, and turns screaming to find Richard Ramirez. She strikes him with an oar and runs. He is intercepted by the hiker, whom he disembowels. Later, the hiker returns alive, only to be killed again. Ramirez takes his name tag, which shows he was a counselor in 1970. Looking back up, the hiker has vanished.

Brooke runs to the payphone but finds it cut. Montana finds her and questions what is going on, but Ray's screams interrupt them. They run to the men's showers, where the men have found Blake. Xavier is distraught, but denies knowing who Blake is. Trevor discovers that Blake's ear has been cut off and they are under siege by Richter.

Margaret walks into her cabin to find Ramirez waiting for her and wanting an explanation for why Jonas (the hiker) will not stay dead. She puts on some music and treats his wounds. He explains that he has killed men before, but never the same person twice. Margaret credits God with the hiker's resurrection, and says he has been dead for many years. To explain, she asks him to tell her the worst thing that had ever happened to him. He describes a difficult childhood of abuse and physical trauma. His cousin treated his seizures and showed him pictures of women he had killed in Vietnam, and his wife objected, only to be murdered in response. Ramirez says that he likes Margaret, and she explains that he should not feel guilty for his actions if they are in service of God's (or Satan's) work. She tasks Richard with defending the camp and protecting the campers.

Xavier tries to get the van started and the counselors attempt an escape, but they collide with Hopple's car before they can get away, distracted by a bloodied Rita in their path. She tells them that Richter is back and stabbed her, but she fortunately escaped. Both Rita and Trevor have vehicles that can take them individually, but neither has keys. They leave in two groups to retrieve them.

Margaret identifies the amnesiac hiker as her old counselor Jonas, and she says he might be dead. He does not understand, but the last thing he remembers is running from blood. He says he left (the younger) her to die, and was hit by Richter in the truck when he ran; Jingles killed him thereafter. They determine that he is a ghost and would have stayed trapped if the counselors had not brought him back to camp.

Rita, Chet, Brooke, and Ray approach the infirmary, and together they look for her keys in the desk to no avail; Richter observes them from outside. Trevor finds his keys, but he and Montana are stalled when Xavier tearfully reveals everything was his fault for bringing Blake and coming to Redwood. Both doors are pounded from the outside, someone wanting in.

== Reception ==
"Mr. Jingles" was watched by 1.49 million people during its original broadcast, and gained a 0.7 ratings share among adults aged 18–49.

The episode received largely positive reviews. On the review aggregator Rotten Tomatoes, "Mr. Jingles" holds an 86% approval rating, based on 21 reviews with an average rating of 8.07/10. The critical consensus reads: "1984 kicks into high-gear with "Mr. Jingles," fleshing out its characters' backstories while twisting the knife in a few unexpected ways."

Ron Hogan of Den of Geek gave the episode a 5/5, saying, "American Horror Story: 1984 isn't a completely clean take on the slasher genre. [...] It's a series that has fun with the genre, but also takes the genre seriously. It's not poking fun, it's trying (and thus far succeeding) at being a slasher with a sense of humor. Part of that fun is watching a cast of good actors inhabiting stock characters with modern twists (Xavier is involved in gay porn and might be gay himself, Chet admits to using steroids, Ray is an orderly who appears to be afraid of dead bodies, the oversexed Montana is bisexual, the girl with the big chest is replaced by a guy with a huge penis, none of the black characters have died thus far, and so on). Also enjoyable is the fairly subtle use of references (I caught a snippet of incidental music from Friday the 13th this week)."

Kat Rosenfield of Entertainment Weekly gave the episode a B+ rating. She started her review by stating she thought the episode was scary enough. She enjoyed the flashback of Brooke's wedding, commenting that while it is "...set to Billy Idol's "White Wedding"... between the puff sleeves and the bloodied satin, there are definitely shades of "November Rain" here, too." However, she criticized the scene between Margaret and Dr. Hopper, thinking that Margaret's philosophy was out of context in this situation. Rosenfield later noted that the episode "pretty much made sense" until the supernatural elements, and concluded by commenting that she enjoyed the cliffhanger.

Variety's Andrea Reiher gave the episode a positive review, and said, "It was a high-octane episode for sure; the plot moved along at a breakneck pace."
