= List of American Horror Story episodes =

American Horror Story is an American anthology horror television series created and produced by Ryan Murphy and Brad Falchuk, which premiered on October 5, 2011, on FX. Each season is conceived as a self-contained miniseries, following a different set of characters and settings, and a storyline with its own "beginning, middle, and end." Every season has been nominated for multiple Primetime Emmy Awards. The first six seasons have won, with Roanoke winning one, Murder House, Asylum and Hotel each winning two, Coven winning four, and Freak Show winning ten.

As of October 29, 2026, 145 episodes of American Horror Story have aired, concluding the thirteenth season. In October 2026, American Horror Story was renewed for a fourteenth season.

== Series overview ==
Season	Title	Episodes		Originally released	
Season	Title	Episodes		First released	Last released
1	Murder House	12		October 5, 2011	December 21, 2011
2	Asylum	13		October 17, 2012	January 23, 2013
3	Coven	13		October 9, 2013	January 29, 2014
4	Freak Show	13		October 8, 2014	January 21, 2015
5	Hotel	12		October 7, 2015	January 13, 2016
6	Roanoke	10		September 14, 2016	November 16, 2016
7	Cult	11		September 5, 2017	November 14, 2017
8	Apocalypse	10		September 12, 2018	November 14, 2018
9	1984	9		September 18, 2019	November 13, 2019
10	Double Feature (Note: The tenth season is split into two narrative parts that aired consecutively, each of which also has its own subtitle; Red Tide for the first six episodes, and Death Valley for the latter four.)	10	6	August 25, 2021	September 22, 2021
10	Double Feature	10	4	September 29, 2021	October 20, 2021
11	NYC	10		October 19, 2022	November 16, 2022
12	Delicate	9	5	September 20, 2023	October 18, 2023
12	Delicate	9	4	April 3, 2024	April 24, 2024
13	13	13		September 24, 2026	October 29, 2026

== Episodes ==
=== Season 1: Murder House (2011) ===
No. overall	No. in season	Title	Directed by	Written by	Original release date	Prod. code	US viewers (millions)
1	1	"Pilot"	Ryan Murphy	Ryan Murphy & Brad Falchuk	October 5, 2011	1ATS79	3.18
2	2	"Home Invasion"	Alfonso Gomez-Rejon	Ryan Murphy & Brad Falchuk	October 12, 2011	1ATS01	2.46
3	3	"Murder House"	Bradley Buecker	Jennifer Salt	October 19, 2011	1ATS02	2.59
4	4	"Halloween"	David Semel	James Wong	October 26, 2011	1ATS03	2.96
5	5	"Halloween"	David Semel	Tim Minear	November 2, 2011	1ATS04	2.74
6	6	"Piggy Piggy"	Michael Uppendahl	Jessica Sharzer	November 9, 2011	1ATS05	2.83
7	7	"Open House"	Tim Hunter	Brad Falchuk	November 16, 2011	1ATS06	3.06
8	8	"Rubber Man"	Miguel Arteta	Ryan Murphy	November 23, 2011	1ATS07	2.81
9	9	"Spooky Little Girl"	John Scott	Jennifer Salt	November 30, 2011	1ATS08	2.85
10	10	"Smoldering Children"	Michael Lehmann	James Wong	December 7, 2011	1ATS09	2.54
11	11	"Birth"	Alfonso Gomez-Rejon	Tim Minear	December 14, 2011	1ATS10	2.59
12	12	"Afterbirth"	Bradley Buecker	Jessica Sharzer	December 21, 2011	1ATS11	3.22

=== Season 2: Asylum (2012–13) ===
No. overall	No. in season	Title	Directed by	Written by	Original release date	Prod. code	US viewers (millions)
13	1	"Welcome to Briarcliff"	Bradley Buecker	Tim Minear	October 17, 2012	2ATS01	3.85
14	2	"Tricks and Treats"	Bradley Buecker	James Wong	October 24, 2012	2ATS02	3.06
15	3	"Nor'easter"	Michael Uppendahl	Jennifer Salt	October 31, 2012	2ATS03	2.47
16	4	"I Am Anne Frank"	Michael Uppendahl	Jessica Sharzer	November 7, 2012	2ATS04	2.65
17	5	"I Am Anne Frank"	Alfonso Gomez-Rejon	Brad Falchuk	November 14, 2012	2ATS05	2.78
18	6	"The Origins of Monstrosity"	David Semel	Ryan Murphy	November 21, 2012	2ATS06	1.89
19	7	"Dark Cousin"	Michael Rymer	Tim Minear	November 28, 2012	2ATS07	2.27
20	8	"Unholy Night"	Michael Lehmann	James Wong	December 5, 2012	2ATS08	2.36
21	9	"The Coat Hanger"	Jeremy Podeswa	Jennifer Salt	December 12, 2012	2ATS09	2.22
22	10	"The Name Game"	Michael Lehmann	Jessica Sharzer	January 2, 2013	2ATS10	2.21
23	11	"Spilt Milk"	Alfonso Gomez-Rejon	Brad Falchuk	January 9, 2013	2ATS11	2.51
24	12	"Continuum"	Craig Zisk	Ryan Murphy	January 16, 2013	2ATS12	2.30
25	13	"Madness Ends"	Alfonso Gomez-Rejon	Tim Minear	January 23, 2013	2ATS13	2.29

=== Season 3: Coven (2013–14) ===
No. overall	No. in season	Title	Directed by	Written by	Original release date	Prod. code	US viewers (millions)
26	1	"Bitchcraft"	Alfonso Gomez-Rejon	Ryan Murphy & Brad Falchuk	October 9, 2013	3ATS01	5.54
27	2	"Boy Parts"	Michael Rymer	Tim Minear	October 16, 2013	3ATS02	4.51
28	3	"The Replacements"	Alfonso Gomez-Rejon	James Wong	October 23, 2013	3ATS03	3.78
29	4	"Fearful Pranks Ensue"	Michael Uppendahl	Jennifer Salt	October 30, 2013	3ATS04	3.71
30	5	"Burn, Witch. Burn!"	Jeremy Podeswa	Jessica Sharzer	November 6, 2013	3ATS05	3.80
31	6	"The Axeman Cometh"	Michael Uppendahl	Douglas Petrie	November 13, 2013	3ATS06	4.16
32	7	"The Dead"	Bradley Buecker	Brad Falchuk	November 20, 2013	3ATS07	4.00
33	8	"The Sacred Taking"	Alfonso Gomez-Rejon	Ryan Murphy	December 4, 2013	3ATS08	4.07
34	9	"Head"	Howard Deutch	Tim Minear	December 11, 2013	3ATS09	3.94
35	10	"The Magical Delights of Stevie Nicks"	Alfonso Gomez-Rejon	James Wong	January 8, 2014	3ATS10	3.49
36	11	"Protect the Coven"	Bradley Buecker	Jennifer Salt	January 15, 2014	3ATS11	3.46
37	12	"Go to Hell"	Alfonso Gomez-Rejon	Jessica Sharzer	January 22, 2014	3ATS12	3.35
38	13	"The Seven Wonders"	Alfonso Gomez-Rejon	Douglas Petrie	January 29, 2014	3ATS13	4.24

=== Season 4: Freak Show (2014–15) ===
No. overall	No. in season	Title	Directed by	Written by	Original release date	Prod. code	US viewers (millions)
39	1	"Monsters Among Us"	Ryan Murphy	Ryan Murphy & Brad Falchuk	October 8, 2014	4ATS01	6.13
40	2	"Massacres and Matinees"	Alfonso Gomez-Rejon	Tim Minear	October 15, 2014	4ATS02	4.53
41	3	"Edward Mordrake"	Michael Uppendahl	James Wong	October 22, 2014	4ATS03	4.44
42	4	"Edward Mordrake"	Howard Deutch	Jennifer Salt	October 29, 2014	4ATS04	4.51
43	5	"Pink Cupcakes"	Michael Uppendahl	Jessica Sharzer	November 5, 2014	4ATS05	4.22
44	6	"Bullseye"	Howard Deutch	John J. Gray	November 12, 2014	4ATS06	3.65
45	7	"Test of Strength"	Anthony Hemingway	Crystal Liu	November 19, 2014	4ATS07	3.91
46	8	"Blood Bath"	Bradley Buecker	Ryan Murphy	December 3, 2014	4ATS08	3.30
47	9	"Tupperware Party Massacre"	Loni Peristere	Brad Falchuk	December 10, 2014	4ATS09	3.07
48	10	"Orphans"	Bradley Buecker	James Wong	December 17, 2014	4ATS10	2.99
49	11	"Magical Thinking"	Michael Goi	Jennifer Salt	January 7, 2015	4ATS11	3.11
50	12	"Show Stoppers"	Loni Peristere	Jessica Sharzer	January 14, 2015	4ATS12	2.94
51	13	"Curtain Call"	Bradley Buecker	John J. Gray	January 21, 2015	4ATS13	3.27

=== Season 5: Hotel (2015–16) ===
No. overall	No. in season	Title	Directed by	Written by	Original release date	Prod. code	US viewers (millions)
52	1	"Checking In"	Ryan Murphy	Ryan Murphy & Brad Falchuk	October 7, 2015	5ATS01	5.81
53	2	"Chutes and Ladders"	Bradley Buecker	Tim Minear	October 14, 2015	5ATS02	4.06
54	3	"Mommy"	Bradley Buecker	James Wong	October 21, 2015	5ATS03	3.20
55	4	"Devil's Night"	Loni Peristere	Jennifer Salt	October 28, 2015	5ATS04	3.04
56	5	"Room Service"	Michael Goi	Ned Martel	November 4, 2015	5ATS05	2.87
57	6	"Room 33"	Loni Peristere	John J. Gray	November 11, 2015	5ATS06	2.64
58	7	"Flicker"	Michael Goi	Crystal Liu	November 18, 2015	5ATS07	2.64
59	8	"The Ten Commandments Killer"	Loni Peristere	Ryan Murphy	December 2, 2015	5ATS08	2.31
60	9	"She Wants Revenge"	Michael Uppendahl	Brad Falchuk	December 9, 2015	5ATS09	2.14
61	10	"She Gets Revenge"	Bradley Buecker	James Wong	December 16, 2015	5ATS10	1.85
62	11	"Battle Royale"	Michael Uppendahl	Ned Martel	January 6, 2016	5ATS11	1.84
63	12	"Be Our Guest"	Bradley Buecker	John J. Gray	January 13, 2016	5ATS12	2.24

=== Season 6: Roanoke (2016) ===
No. overall	No. in season	Title	Directed by	Written by	Original release date	Prod. code	US viewers (millions)
64	1	"Chapter 1"	Bradley Buecker	Ryan Murphy & Brad Falchuk	September 14, 2016	6ATS01	5.14
65	2	"Chapter 2"	Michael Goi	Tim Minear	September 21, 2016	6ATS02	3.27
66	3	"Chapter 3"	Jennifer Lynch	James Wong	September 28, 2016	6ATS03	3.08
67	4	"Chapter 4"	Marita Grabiak	John J. Gray	October 5, 2016	6ATS04	2.83
68	5	"Chapter 5"	Nelson Cragg	Akela Cooper	October 12, 2016	6ATS05	2.82
69	6	"Chapter 6"	Angela Bassett	Ned Martel	October 19, 2016	6ATS06	2.48
70	7	"Chapter 7"	Elodie Keene	Crystal Liu	October 26, 2016	6ATS07	2.62
71	8	"Chapter 8"	Gwyneth Horder-Payton	Todd Kubrak	November 2, 2016	6ATS08	2.20
72	9	"Chapter 9"	Alexis O. Korycinski	Tim Minear	November 9, 2016	6ATS09	2.43
73	10	"Chapter 10"	Bradley Buecker	Ryan Murphy & Brad Falchuk	November 16, 2016	6ATS10	2.45

=== Season 7: Cult (2017) ===
No. overall	No. in season	Title	Directed by	Written by	Original release date	Prod. code	US viewers (millions)
74	1	"Election Night"	Bradley Buecker	Ryan Murphy & Brad Falchuk	September 5, 2017	7ATS01	3.93
75	2	"Don't Be Afraid of the Dark"	Liza Johnson	Tim Minear	September 12, 2017	7ATS02	2.38
76	3	"Neighbors from Hell"	Gwyneth Horder-Payton	James Wong	September 19, 2017	7ATS03	2.25
77	4	"11/9"	Gwyneth Horder-Payton	John J. Gray	September 26, 2017	7ATS04	2.13
78	5	"Holes"	Maggie Kiley	Crystal Liu	October 3, 2017	7ATS05	2.20
79	6	"Mid-Western Assassin"	Bradley Buecker	Todd Kubrak	October 10, 2017	7ATS06	2.15
80	7	"Valerie Solanas Died for Your Sins: Scumbag"	Rachel Goldberg	Crystal Liu	October 17, 2017	7ATS07	2.07
81	8	"Winter of Our Discontent"	Barbara Brown	Joshua Green	October 24, 2017	7ATS08	2.06
82	9	"Drink the Kool-Aid"	Angela Bassett	Adam Penn	October 31, 2017	7ATS09	1.48
83	10	"Charles (Manson) in Charge"	Bradley Buecker	Ryan Murphy & Brad Falchuk	November 7, 2017	7ATS10	1.82
84	11	"Great Again"	Jennifer Lynch	Tim Minear	November 14, 2017	7ATS11	1.97

=== Season 8: Apocalypse (2018) ===
No. overall	No. in season	Title	Directed by	Written by	Original release date	Prod. code	US viewers (millions)
85	1	"The End"	Bradley Buecker	Ryan Murphy & Brad Falchuk	September 12, 2018	8ATS01	3.08
86	2	"The Morning After"	Jennifer Lynch	James Wong	September 19, 2018	8ATS02	2.21
87	3	"Forbidden Fruit"	Loni Peristere	Manny Coto	September 26, 2018	8ATS03	1.95
88	4	"Could It Be... Satan?"	Sheree Folkson	Tim Minear	October 3, 2018	8ATS04	2.02
89	5	"Boy Wonder"	Gwyneth Horder-Payton	John J. Gray	October 10, 2018	8ATS05	2.12
90	6	"Return to Murder House"	Sarah Paulson	Crystal Liu	October 17, 2018	8ATS06	2.01
91	7	"Traitor"	Jennifer Lynch	Adam Penn	October 24, 2018	8ATS07	1.85
92	8	"Sojourn"	Bradley Buecker	Josh Green	October 31, 2018	8ATS08	1.63
93	9	"Fire and Reign"	Jennifer Arnold	Asha Michelle Wilson	November 7, 2018	8ATS09	1.65
94	10	"Apocalypse Then"	Bradley Buecker	Ryan Murphy & Brad Falchuk	November 14, 2018	8ATS10	1.83

=== Season 9: 1984 (2019) ===
No. overall	No. in season	Title	Directed by	Written by	Original release date	Prod. code	US viewers (millions)
95	1	"Camp Redwood"	Bradley Buecker	Ryan Murphy & Brad Falchuk	September 18, 2019	9ATS01	2.13
96	2	"Mr. Jingles"	John J. Gray	Tim Minear	September 25, 2019	9ATS02	1.49
97	3	"Slashdance"	Mary Wigmore	James Wong	October 2, 2019	9ATS03	1.34
98	4	"True Killers"	Jennifer Lynch	Jay Beattie	October 9, 2019	9ATS04	1.29
99	5	"Red Dawn"	Gwyneth Horder-Payton	Dan Dworkin	October 16, 2019	9ATS05	1.09
100	6	"Episode 100"	Loni Peristere	Ryan Murphy & Brad Falchuk	October 23, 2019	9ATS06	1.35
101	7	"The Lady in White"	Liz Friedlander	John J. Gray	October 30, 2019	9ATS07	1.05
102	8	"Rest in Pieces"	Gwyneth Horder-Payton	Adam Penn	November 6, 2019	9ATS08	1.05
103	9	"Final Girl"	John J. Gray	Crystal Liu	November 13, 2019	9ATS09	1.08

=== Season 10: Double Feature (2021) ===
No. overall	No. in season	Title	Directed by	Written by	Original release date	Prod. code	US viewers (millions)
Part 1: Red Tide
104	1	"Cape Fear"	John J. Gray	Brad Falchuk	August 25, 2021	AATS01	0.925
105	2	"Pale"	Loni Peristere	Brad Falchuk	August 25, 2021	AATS02	0.581
106	3	"Thirst"	Loni Peristere	Brad Falchuk	September 1, 2021	AATS03	0.697
107	4	"Blood Buffet"	Axelle Carolyn	Brad Falchuk	September 8, 2021	AATS04	0.610
108	5	"Gaslight"	John J. Gray	Brad Falchuk & Manny Coto	September 15, 2021	AATS05	0.642
109	6	"Winter Kills"	John J. Gray	Ryan Murphy	September 22, 2021	AATS06	0.732
Part 2: Death Valley
110	7	"Take Me to Your Leader"	Max Winkler	Brad Falchuk & Kristen Reidel & Manny Coto	September 29, 2021	AATS07	0.687
111	8	"Inside"	Tessa Blake	Manny Coto & Kristen Reidel & Brad Falchuk	October 6, 2021	AATS08	0.483
112	9	"Blue Moon"	Laura Belsey & John J. Gray	Kristen Reidel & Manny Coto & Reilly Smith	October 13, 2021	AATS09	0.579
113	10	"The Future Perfect"	Axelle Carolyn	Brad Falchuk & Manny Coto & Kristen Reidel & Reilly Smith	October 20, 2021	AATS10	0.579

=== Season 11: NYC (2022) ===
No. overall	No. in season	Title	Directed by	Written by	Original release date	Prod. code	US viewers (millions)
114	1	"Something's Coming"	John J. Gray	Ryan Murphy & Brad Falchuk	October 19, 2022	BATS01	0.384
115	2	"Thank You for Your Service"	Max Winkler	Ned Martel & Charlie Carver & Manny Coto	October 19, 2022	BATS02	0.276
116	3	"Smoke Signals"	John J. Gray	Brad Falchuk & Manny Coto	October 26, 2022	BATS03	0.378
117	4	"Black Out"	Jennifer Lynch	Ned Martel & Charlie Carver	October 26, 2022	BATS04	0.279
118	5	"Bad Fortune"	Paris Barclay	Our Lady J & Jennifer Salt	November 2, 2022	BATS05	0.265
119	6	"The Body"	John J. Gray	Brad Falchuk & Manny Coto & Our Lady J	November 2, 2022	BATS06	0.191
120	7	"The Sentinel"	Paris Barclay	Our Lady J & Manny Coto	November 9, 2022	BATS07	0.274
121	8	"Fire Island"	Jennifer Lynch	Ned Martel & Charlie Carver & Our Lady J	November 9, 2022	BATS08	0.152
122	9	"Requiem 1981/1987"	Our Lady J	Our Lady J	November 16, 2022	BATS09	0.277
123	10	"Requiem 1981/1987"	Jennifer Lynch	Ned Martel & Charlie Carver	November 16, 2022	BATS10	0.191

=== Season 12: Delicate (2023–24) ===
No. overall	No. in season	Title	Directed by	Written by	Original release date	Prod. code	US viewers (millions)
Part 1
124	1	"Multiply Thy Pain"	Jessica Yu	Halley Feiffer	September 20, 2023	CATS01	0.454
125	2	"Rockabye"	Jennifer Lynch	Halley Feiffer	September 27, 2023	CATS02	0.318
126	3	"When the Bough Breaks"	Jennifer Lynch	Halley Feiffer	October 4, 2023	CATS03	0.366
127	4	"Vanishing Twin"	John J. Gray	Halley Feiffer	October 11, 2023	CATS04	0.358
128	5	"Preech"	John J. Gray	Halley Feiffer	October 18, 2023	CATS05	0.239
Part 2
129	6	"Opening Night"	Bradley Buecker	Halley Feiffer	April 3, 2024	CATS06	0.243
130	7	"Ave Hestia"	Jennifer Lynch	Halley Feiffer	April 10, 2024	CATS07	0.312
131	8	"Little Gold Man"	Jennifer Lynch	Halley Feiffer	April 17, 2024	CATS08	0.158
132	9	"The Auteur"	Gwyneth Horder-Payton	Halley Feiffer	April 24, 2024	CATS09	0.232

=== Season 13: 13 (2026) ===
No. overall	No. in season	Title	Directed by	Written by	Original release date	Prod. code	US viewers (millions)
133	1	"13"	Ryan Murphy	Ryan Murphy & Brad Falchuk	September 24, 2026	DATS01	N/A
134	2	"1:13 AM"	Crystle Roberson Dorsey	Ned Martel & Charlie Carver	September 24, 2026	DATS02	N/A
135	3	"Rauhnacht"	Crystle Roberson Dorsey	Ned Martel & Charlie Carver	September 24, 2026	DATS03	N/A
136	4	"Is That All There Is?"	Alfonso Gomez-Rejon	Ned Martel & Charlie Carver	October 1, 2026	DATS04	N/A
137	5	"Date Night"	Jesse Peretz	Ned Martel & Charlie Carver	October 1, 2026	DATS05	N/A
138	6	"The Return of Devil's Night"	Crystle Roberson Dorsey	Ned Martel & Charlie Carver	October 1, 2026	DATS06	N/A
139	7	"The Baddest Witch of Them All"	Alfonso Gomez-Rejon	Ned Martel & Charlie Carver	October 8, 2026	DATS07	TBD
140	8	"Hell No"	Crystle Roberson Dorsey	Ned Martel & Charlie Carver	October 8, 2026	DATS08	TBD
141	9	"The Devil Is in the Details"	Adam Penn	Ryan Murphy & Ned Martel & Charlie Carver	October 15, 2026	DATS09	TBD
142	10	"The Prodigal Son"	Gillian Robespierre	Ned Martel & Charlie Carver & Brad Falchuk	October 15, 2026	DATS10	TBD
143	11	"Madison's Happy Ending"	Adam Penn	Ned Martel & Charlie Carver & Ryan Murphy	October 22, 2026	DATS11	TBD
144	12	"Sisters in Arms"	Gillian Robespierre	Ned Martel & Charlie Carver	October 22, 2026	DATS12	TBD
145	13	"Devil of a Good Time"	Crystle Roberson Dorsey	Ned Martel & Charlie Carver & Brad Falchuk	October 29, 2026	DATS13	TBD
