= Rest in Pieces (American Horror Story) =

- American Horror Story episode
- Episode no.: Season 9 Episode 8
- Directed by: Gwyneth Horder-Payton
- Written by: Adam Penn
- Production code: 9ATS08
- Original air date: November 6, 2019
- Running time: 38 minutes

Guest appearances
- DeRon Horton as Ray Powell; Leslie Jordan as Courtney; Lou Taylor Pucci as Jonas Shevoore; Stefanie Black as Stacey Phillips; Sean Liang as Wide Load; Lily Rabe as Lavinia Richter; Dylan McDermott as Bruce

Episode chronology
| ← Previous "The Lady in White" | Next → "Final Girl" |
- American Horror Story: 1984

"Rest in Pieces" is the eighth episode of the ninth season of the anthology television series American Horror Story. It aired on November 6, 2019, on the cable network FX. The episode was written by Adam Penn, and directed by Gwyneth Horder-Payton.

== Plot ==
Shortly before Halloween, Bruce recovers and drives to Camp Redwood, interrupting a fight between Ramirez and Richter's ghost in the process. Ramirez enlists him to help eliminate Richter, eventually learning Richter is a ghost. Donna and Brooke are approached by Stacy, a tabloid writer who knows their identities, and they take her with them to Camp Redwood. Brooke promises to reveal the true story to Stacy, secretly planning to kill her, but Donna stops her and convinces her to focus on Margaret. Stacy flees, only to be killed by Bruce, Ramirez, and Margaret. Margaret reveals to Bruce and Ramirez her plan: inspired by places like Jim Morrison's grave, the Dakota and Graceland, she plans to murder the rest of the bands (except Billy Idol at Ramirez's insistence) at her festival, turning Camp Redwood into a memorial shrine for the deceased musicians and rake in a fortune from the people flocking to pay their respects. Trevor declares his love to Montana's ghost and plans to kill himself to join her, but she pushes him away, guilty and distraught about her relationship with Ramirez, having learned of what he had done from Richter. The dead counselors, enraged at Richter's past murder spree, tie him up and refuse to allow him to escape to kill Ramirez, intending to kill him over and over for the rest of his afterlife. Bobby's ghost appears and drags Richter into the lake; he awakens next to Bobby and Lavinia (the latter of whom has had a change of heart) and who convince him to stay with them.

== Reception ==
"Rest in Pieces" was watched by 1.05 million people during its original broadcast, and gained a 0.5 ratings share among adults aged 18–49. The episode had the fewest viewers of any episode in the entire series.

The episode received mostly positive reviews. On the review aggregator Rotten Tomatoes, "Rest in Pieces" holds a 62% approval rating, based on 13 reviews with an average rating of 7/10.

Ron Hogan of Den of Geek gave the episode a 4/5, saying, "That's a big milestone; the change-over from one decade to another always seems like a big deal to people, and in a lot of ways to the characters on American Horror Story: 1984, the end of the Reagan era is also the end of their era of relevance. It's been a common retrain in the later portions of the season. Their time is ending, and they'll all soon be forgotten, but never is it more explicitly stated than in this week's episode, with multiple people eulogizing the good and ill of Reagan's America in long rhapsodies." He also praised the directing of the episode, commenting that "In the hands of director Gwyneth Horder-Payton, it's easy to see how afterlife in Redwood could be as beautiful as spending the afterlife anywhere else." Finally, he concluded his review with "Things are building to a head at Camp Redwood, and the season finale promises to be a huge blow-out battle between serial killers with a lot of innocent people trapped in between the two stabbing, slashing, shooting sides."

Kat Rosenfield of Entertainment Weekly gave the episode a B rating. She enjoyed Bruce's return, and thought his first scene of the episode was "amusing". She also commented "the endless cycle of murder, ghost drama, and more murder" at Camp Redwood, especially the confusing relationship between the ghosts. She compared that part of the episode to the first season of MTV's The Real World. She also added that Richter's revelation about Montana and Ramirez "just makes everything that much more awkward". Additionally, Rosenfield was puzzled about Margaret's plan, describing it as "'the day the music died,' except with way more feathered bangs and synth beats." However, she enjoyed the final scenes of Richter in this episode and, like she did in her previous reviews, she compared them to Friday the 13th. Overall, she was globally satisfied with the episode, commenting that "And just like the slasher films that inspired it, this season is setting up for a super-serial showdown that combines every trope in the blood’n’guts box."
