= Apocalypse Then =

- American Horror Story episode
- Episode no.: Season 8 Episode 10
- Directed by: Bradley Buecker
- Written by: Ryan Murphy & Brad Falchuk
- Production code: 8ATS10
- Original air date: November 14, 2018
- Running time: 46 minutes

Guest appearances
- Frances Conroy as Myrtle Snow; Lily Rabe as Misty Day; Angela Bassett as Marie Laveau; Jessica Lange as Constance Langdon; Taissa Farmiga as Zoe Benson; Gabourey Sidibe as Queenie; Jamie Brewer as Nan; Billy Eichner as Mutt Nutter / Brock; Naomi Grossman as Samantha Crowe; Kyle Allen as Timothy Campbell; Ash Santos as Emily; Carlo Rota as Anton LaVey

Episode chronology
← Previous "Fire and Reign"	Next → "Camp Redwood"
- American Horror Story: Apocalypse

"Apocalypse Then" is the tenth and final episode of the eighth season of the anthology television series American Horror Story. It aired on November 14, 2018, on the cable network FX. The episode was written by Ryan Murphy & Brad Falchuk, and directed by Bradley Buecker.

== Plot ==
Myrtle infiltrates Jeff and Mutt's lab using mind control magic to secure placements for Coco and her family at Outpost 3 after the apocalypse. Cordelia casts spells on Coco and Mallory so they can stay at the Outpost undetected by Michael until the point where Mallory's powers resurface, and she is ready to perform Tempus infinitum to travel back in time and incapacitate Michael. The witches learn that the voodoo queen Dinah Stevens defected to Michael's side to have her own talk show and swear revenge.

After the apocalypse; following the events of the witches' arrival at the Outpost, Dinah asserts her loyalty to Michael, but the former voodoo queen, Marie Laveau, released from Hell by Papa Legba in exchange for Dinah's more corrupted soul, kills Dinah in a fit of rage as a punishment for her betrayal. Cordelia destroys the android Miriam Mead with an explosion spell which distracts Michael and enables Madison to shoot him dead with Mead's severed robotic arm.

Before Michael can resurrect, Cordelia and Myrtle take Mallory to a safe place to begin the spell, but Mallory is stabbed by Brock leaving her too weak to perform magic, Myrtle burns him to death. Michael resurrects and goes on a killing spree, murdering Madison, Marie, and Coco. Realizing the gravity of their situation, Cordelia faces Michael and kills herself to let Mallory ascend as the Supreme and initiate the Tempus infinitum spell.

Mallory arrives in 2015 and kills Michael by running him over with a car multiple times. Constance Langdon watches and leaves him to die on the street rather than let his spirit reside in the Murder House, erasing the timeline of the Antichrist's rise to power and the apocalypse. Mallory arrives at the Robichaux's Academy and meets the other witches for the first time from their perspective. With the timeline altered, Myrtle remains dead and Madison remains in Hell (although Mallory says she will bring her back). Mallory also prevents Queenie from visiting Hotel Cortez, saving her life. Out of gratitude for dispatching Michael, Nan appears to escort Misty Day from Hell.

In 2020, Timothy and Emily, previously selected for their genetic potential in the erased timeline, meet and eventually have a child named Devon, who kills his nanny similar to Michael's first murder. Soon after that, Anton LaVey, Samantha Crowe, and Miriam Mead arrive to visit the new Antichrist.

== Reception ==
"Apocalypse Then" was watched by 1.83 million people during its original broadcast, and gained a 0.8 ratings share among adults aged 18–49.

The episode received mostly positive reviews. On the review aggregator Rotten Tomatoes, "Apocalypse Then" holds a 79% approval rating, based on 24 reviews with an average rating of 8.30/10. The critical consensus reads, "Ryan Murphy goes full Ryan Murphy in "Apocalypse Then," barreling past two convoluted episodes of multiverse building to deliver a satisfying, batsh—t finale that lives up to its namesake."

Ron Hogan of Den of Geek gave the episode a 4/5, saying, "The finale of American Horror Story's most ambitious season manages to mash together two different series, marry separate mythologies, and somehow form a coherent season out of the chocolate and peanut butter of Murder House and Coven." He added, "Writers Ryan Murphy and Brad Falchuk aren't reinventing the wheel, but time travel does give the two an opportunity to bring back Jessica Lange as Constance again. Her exchanges with Michael are some of the best on the show" before concluding with "even though the episode leans towards voiceover by the end, as Mallory explains her status as the Billy Pilgrim of the American Horror Story universe, it's still a very satisfying ending".

Kat Rosenfield from Entertainment Weekly gave the episode an A+. She was pleased by the end of the pre-apocalypse flashbacks, and the entire showdown between the witches and Langdon. She also enjoyed the return of Bassett's Marie Laveau and the demise of Dinah. She noticed and appreciated the "double sci-fi homage" during Robot Mead's destruction, describing it as "a Scanners-style body explosion, followed by a very Space Odyssey rendition of 'Daisy, Daisy' by her dying, decapitated [sic] head". Finally, she praised the return of Lange's Constance, commenting that "this finale was already A-grade material, but this second glorious cameo from Jessica Lange merits a 'plus'".

Vulture's Ziwe Fumudoh gave the episode a 5 out of 5. Much like Rosenfield, she praised the return of Angela Bassett and Jessica Lange, commenting "do you understand how privileged we are to watch an episode of television with Angela Bassett, Jessica Lange, and Sarah Paulson?" She was a fan of the showdown between the witches and Langdon, even if the deaths of Madison, Marie and Coco were "laughable". She also enjoyed the death of Langdon, saying that "it's mean but so delicious", and Lange's "impeccable monologue" at the start of the scene. Finally, she liked the cliffhanger of the episode, as it gives "hope for another epic battle between witches, warlocks, and a Lucifer with luscious locks".
