= Boy Parts =

- American Horror Story episode
- Episode no.: Season 3 Episode 2
- Directed by: Michael Rymer
- Written by: Tim Minear
- Production code: 3ATS02
- Original air date: October 16, 2013
- Running time: 43 minutes

Guest appearances
- Angela Bassett as Marie Laveau; Gabourey Sidibe as Queenie; Josh Hamilton as Hank Foxx; Jamie Brewer as Nan; Lance E. Nichols as Detective Sanchez

Episode chronology
← Previous "Bitchcraft"	Next → "The Replacements"
- American Horror Story: Coven

"Boy Parts" is the second episode of the third season of the anthology television series American Horror Story, which premiered on October 16, 2013, on the cable network FX. The title is a reference to a line in this episode spoken by Madison Montgomery.

The episode sheds light on how Delphine LaLaurie (Kathy Bates) managed to remain alive in the present day, it also reveals the fate of Marie Laveau (Angela Bassett). The character of Misty Day (Lily Rabe) is introduced a little more in-depth than from what was seen in the first episode. Angela Bassett and Gabourey Sidibe guest star as Marie Laveau and Queenie, respectively. This episode is rated TV-MA (LSV).

== Plot ==
Detective Sanchez and Stiles interrupt to talk to Madison and Zoe about the deaths of the fraternity brothers. Zoe cracks and reveals to the detectives that they're all witches. Cordelia and Fiona cover for her.

Zoe and Madison cast a resurrection spell in order to bring Kyle back to life. When Kyle reanimates as a scared, angry monster, Zoe must seek help from a reclusive Necromancer, Misty Day.

At a gynecology appointment, Cordelia gets bad news that her fertility drugs aren't working after a year of taking them. Dr. Morrison suggests in-vitro. Hank, her husband, asks if she wants to keep trying and asks her to use magic, but she doesn't want to become like her mother. He tells her that using dark magic is not self-serving but will help them start a family of their own. Later, she brews a potion and performs a sex ritual with Hank using dark magic.

Still seeking to be perpetually young and beautiful, Fiona questions her new captive, Madame Delphine LaLaurie. Delphine tells Fiona that 180 years ago, a voodoo priestess named Marie Laveau gave her an immortality elixir, killed her family, and buried her alive. In hopes of becoming immortal as well, Fiona visits the still-living Laveau in a 9th Ward beauty salon and confides that she wants to know her secret to immortality. Marie mocks her and calls her muscle to toss Fiona out, so Fiona lights her racks of wigs on fire, promising she'll be back.

== Reception ==
In its original American broadcast, "Boy Parts" received a 2.5 18–49 ratings share and was watched by 4.51 million viewers.

"Boy Parts" was critically acclaimed. Rotten Tomatoes reports a 100% approval rating, based on 15 reviews. The critical consensus reads, ""Boy Parts" is escapist camp and perfect fodder for the enormously talented female cast." Emily VanDerWerff of The A.V. Club gave the episode a B rating for "Boy Parts", stating that the episode was "all good fun". Matt Fowler from IGN gave the episode a 7.9/10 rating, calling it a good episode, though stating, "I'm still waiting for something truly great to pop out at me in American Horror Story: Coven."

At Vulture, Rakesh Satyal gave the episode 3 of 5 stars, calling it "a slower episode after the premiere" and criticizing it for "long swaths of exposition." However, Satyal praised Lange, Bates, and Bassett's performances and expressed excitement for the storylines involving Marie Laveau and Kyle.

The Huffington Post's Chris Jancelewicz criticized the show for "an entire segment...that isn't quite working." He noted an imbalance between "a super-strong older cast knocking it out of the park" and the teenage witch storyline he finds much less interesting, despite strong acting from the younger cast. He also stated that a resurrection plot should "never, ever be included in any movie or TV show ever again." However, Jancelewicz complimented scenes involving Marie, Fiona, LaLaurie, and Misty, and "remain[s] optimistic" about the rest of the season.
