= Episode 100 (American Horror Story) =

- American Horror Story episode
- Episode no.: Season 9 Episode 6
- Directed by: Loni Peristere
- Written by: Ryan Murphy & Brad Falchuk
- Production code: 9ATS06
- Original air date: October 23, 2019
- Running time: 41 minutes

Guest appearances
- DeRon Horton as Ray Powell; Leslie Jordan as Courtney; Nick Chinlund as Prison Warden; Tanya Clarke as Lorraine Richter; Yvonne Zima as Red; Eric Staves as Dustin

Episode chronology
← Previous "Red Dawn"	Next → "The Lady in White"
- American Horror Story: 1984

"Episode 100" is the sixth episode of the ninth season and the 100th episode overall of the anthology television series American Horror Story. Written by series creators Ryan Murphy and Brad Falchuk and directed by Loni Peristere, it aired on October 23, 2019, on the cable network FX.

== Plot ==
One year after the events at Camp Redwood, Richter has grown weary of Ramirez's murderous tendencies and alerts the locals to his presence, giving Richter the chance to drive away alone and resulting in Ramirez's arrest. Four years later, the ghosts of Montana and Xavier, still trapped in purgatory on the campgrounds, kill anyone who trespasses, much to the frustration of Ray's ghost and the ghosts of the 1970 counselors. Meanwhile, Margaret has become a rich real estate mogul by renovating infamous murder locations alongside Trevor, who survived her murder attempt. The two entered into a contentious marriage amid Trevor's threat to expose the truth. Margaret chooses Camp Redwood as her next project, to the chagrin of Chet's ghost. A reformed Richter, now with a new name, Donald, and living a quiet life in Alaska with his new wife and son, learns of the project. He returns home one night to find his wife murdered by Ramirez, who broke out of prison with Satan's help. Richter gives his son away and leaves, intent on killing Ramirez. Brooke is seemingly executed for the Camp Redwood murders, but Donna, posing as the executioner, saves her.

== Reception ==
"Episode 100" was watched by 1.35 million people during its original broadcast, and gained a 0.6 ratings share among adults aged 18–49.

The episode received largely positive reviews from critics. On the review aggregator Rotten Tomatoes, "Episode 100" holds a 93% approval rating, based on 14 reviews with an average rating of 7.4/10. The critical consensus reads: "Though the meandering plot continues to confuse, an intriguing time jump and a host of previous season tie-ins drive this episode home."

Ron Hogan of Den of Geek gave the episode a 4/5, saying, "The true story is insane, and rather than embellishing it, the show plays it straight and the end result is funnier than most jokes could have been in that situation." Then, he praised the cast, commenting that "Leslie Grossman and Matthew Morrison play out early in the episode feels like one they've had many times before, sort of a Virginia Woolf situation if Elizabeth Taylor's Martha had murdered several people. Leslie Jordan, as always, steals the scenes he shows up in based on costuming alone. [...] John Carroll Lynch continues is criminally underrated actor, putting in good work in a role that won't be appreciated outside of horror circles." Finally, he concluded his review by "It takes a few twists to get everyone involved in 1984 back to the place where it all started, but it works. Rich people throwing music festivals was a big deal in the late 1980s, and it's a smart way to get the gang back together despite most of them being dead. Nothing gets people talking like a sequel, and Camp Redwood is ripe for the picking."

Kat Rosenfield of Entertainment Weekly gave the episode a B+ rating. She enjoyed the different scenes with the ghosts at Camp Redwood, commenting that "The ghosts of Camp Redwood are numerous, and fabulous." She also appreciated the evolution of some characters in this episode. The first one being Brooke, as she noted that she "traded her [...] virginal innocence for something, uh, else." The second one being Jingles, as she wondered if the character would "once again donning his villain's raincoat" or if he would become a hero in the last episodes of the season. However, Rosenfield was more critical of Margaret's evolution, commenting that it "seems a little cliché". Finally, she really enjoyed the cliffhanger of the episode, with the appearance of Donna, and even more the return of Leslie Jordan for the rest of the season.

Variety's Andrea Reiher gave a positive review, and said "The 1984 season is now on an entirely different timeline and trajectory from the beginning of the season, but the Camp Redwood setting is still integral to the storytelling, so the final four episodes should see everyone congregate back on the campgrounds for some more murderous fun before season's end. "Episode 100" didn't offer any cameos from quintessential players from American Horror Story's past, such as Evan Peters, Sarah Paulson or Jessica Lange, but who knows what may happen in the back half of the season?"
