= A Midsummer Night's Dream (2017 film) =

- Directed by: Casey Wilder Mott
- Written by: Casey Wilder Mott
- Based on: A Midsummer Night's Dream; 1600 play by William Shakespeare
- Produced by: Fran Kranz; Douglas Matejka; Casey Wilder Mott; Joshua Skurla
- Starring: Rachael Leigh Cook; Paz de la Huerta; Avan Jogia; Fran Kranz; Ted Levine; Hamish Linklater; Lily Rabe; Mia Doi Todd; Charity Wakefield; Saul Williams; Finn Wittrock
- Cinematography: Daniel Katz
- Edited by: Curtiss Clayton; Saul Herckis
- Music by: Mia Doi Todd; Saul Williams
- Production companies: Empyrean Pictures; 5B Productions
- Distributed by: Brainstorm Media
- Release dates: June 2017 (Los Angeles Film Festival); July 13, 2018
- Running time: 105 minutes
- Country: United States
- Language: English

A Midsummer Night's Dream is a 2017 film adaptation of the play A Midsummer Night's Dream by William Shakespeare. The film is a modern rendition that relocates the story from ancient Athens to present-day Los Angeles.

== Plot ==
The film follows the original play but is set in modern-day Los Angeles. Because of this, the film has minute changes to suit the new setting. Among them is the "rude mechanicals" who are depicted as filmmakers. Quince is now female and a romantic subplot is added between her and Nick Bottom. Duke Theseus is now a film producer with implied connections to the criminal underworld. The fairies are implied to be forest bohemians, though they still possess magic. Nick Bottom's transformation into an ass is taken quite literally in this version with his face turning into a butt, complete with fart noises.

While the film retains the original Shakespearian dialogue, it will occasionally add new dialogue, some of which reference Shakespeare's other works, for humorous effect.

== Cast ==
- Lily Rabe as Helena
- Hamish Linklater as Lysander
- Finn Wittrock as Demetrius
- Rachael Leigh Cook as Hermia
- Fran Kranz as Bottom
- Avan Jogia as Puck
- Ted Levine as Duke Theseus
- Paz De La Huerta as Hippolyta
- Saul Williams as Oberon
- Mia Doi Todd as Titania
- Charity Wakefield as Quince
- Charlie Carver as Snout
- Max Carver as Snug
- Justine Lupe as Flute

== Production ==
The film was adapted for the screen and directed by Casey Wilder Mott. The production companies were 5B Productions and Empyrean Pictures.

The film's original soundtrack, composed by Mia Doi Todd, features guest appearances by Tunde Adebimpe, Cut Chemist, Dntel, Miguel Atwood-Ferguson, Dungen, and others.

== Release and reception ==
A Midsummer Night's Dream premiered at the Los Angeles Film Festival in June 2017, where it received positive reviews.

The film was acquired for a theatrical release by Brainstorm Media and played at Landmark Theatres and other venues nationwide in the summer of 2018.

The film received generally positive reviews upon its theatrical opening. On review aggregator Rotten Tomatoes, it holds an approval rating of 65%, based on 17 reviews with an average rating of 6.4/10. Metacritic gives the film a weighted average score of 67 out of 100, based on 8 critics, indicating "generally favorable" reviews.
