= Finn Wittrock =

American actor (born 1984)

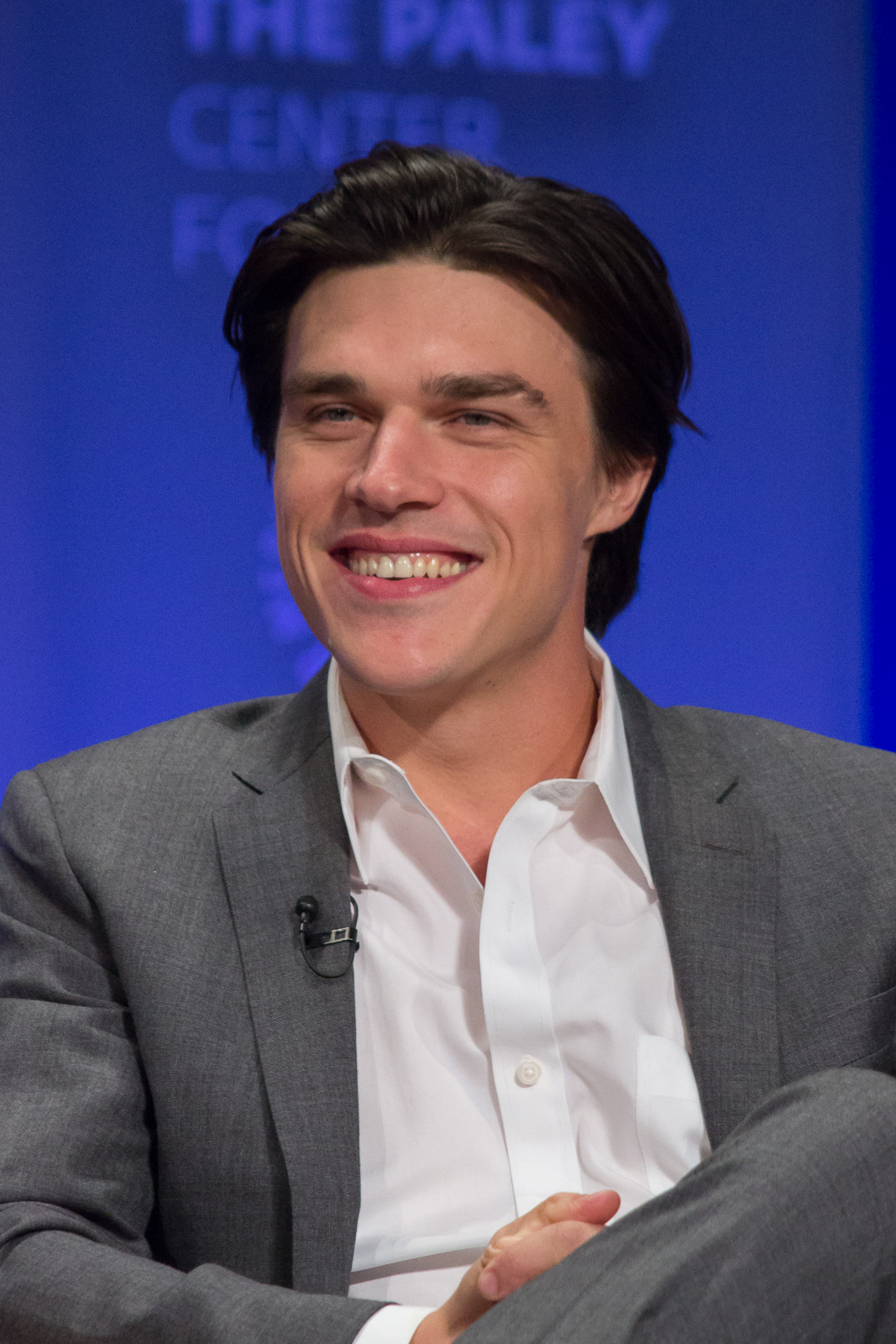
- Wittrock at the 2015 PaleyFest
- Born: October 28, 1984 (age 42); Lenox, Massachusetts, U.S.
- Education: Juilliard School (BFA)
- Occupation: Actor
- Years active: 2002–present
- Spouse: Sarah Roberts (m. 2014)
- Children: 1

Peter L. "Finn" Wittrock Jr. (born October 28, 1984) is an American actor, known for his collaborations with television producer Ryan Murphy. He began his career in guest roles on several television shows, while making his film debut in 2004's Halloweentown High and later returning to films in 2010's Twelve. After studying theater at The Juilliard School, he was a regular in the soap opera All My Children from 2009 to 2011, while performing in several theatrical productions. In 2011, he performed in playwright Tony Kushner's Off-Broadway play The Illusion and made his Broadway debut in 2012 as Happy Loman in the revival of Arthur Miller's play Death of a Salesman, directed by Mike Nichols.

In 2014, he gained recognition for his roles in the films The Normal Heart (his first collaboration with Murphy), Noah, and Unbroken, and garnered a Primetime Emmy Award nomination for his role as Dandy Mott in the FX series American Horror Story: Freak Show. In 2015, he portrayed model Tristan Duffy and actor Rudolph Valentino in American Horror Story: Hotel, and starred in the ensemble cast of Adam McKay's The Big Short. In 2016, Wittrock guest starred as Jether Polk in American Horror Story: Roanoke, and played Greg in Damien Chazelle's La La Land. In 2018, he portrayed murder victim Jeffrey Trail in the FX crime drama series The Assassination of Gianni Versace: American Crime Story for which he received a second Emmy nomination. In his seventh collaboration with Ryan Murphy, Wittrock played murderer Edmund Tolleson in the Netflix series Ratched (2020).

== Early life ==
Wittrock was born in Lenox, Massachusetts, the son of Kate Claire Crowley, a professor of occupational therapy at the University of Southern California, and Peter L. Wittrock, an actor. He has a younger brother, Dylan. As a child, he grew up at the Shakespeare & Company theatre, where his father worked, and would often act as a pageboy or messenger. As a teenager, he attended the Los Angeles County High School for the Arts, where he would act, make films and be a part of movement classes for actors. In 2003, Wittrock was named a U.S Presidential Scholar in the Arts as part of the Presidential Scholars program. He is also a YoungArts alumnus. After graduating from high school, he was accepted into the Juilliard School, but turned them down, hoping to get work in Los Angeles.

Wittrock acted in some episodes for television, but would often face rejection. He auditioned for Juilliard the next year and was accepted again. He attended the school, where he was a member of the drama division's Group 37 (2004–2008). He was an active participant in the drama department and starred in several theatrical productions. He also won the Juilliard Journal Award, in recognition of his outstanding contributions to Juilliard's newspaper, The Juilliard Journal; and was the recipient of the drama division's Stephanie Palmer McClelland Scholarship. He graduated with a Bachelor of Fine Arts in 2008.

== Career ==
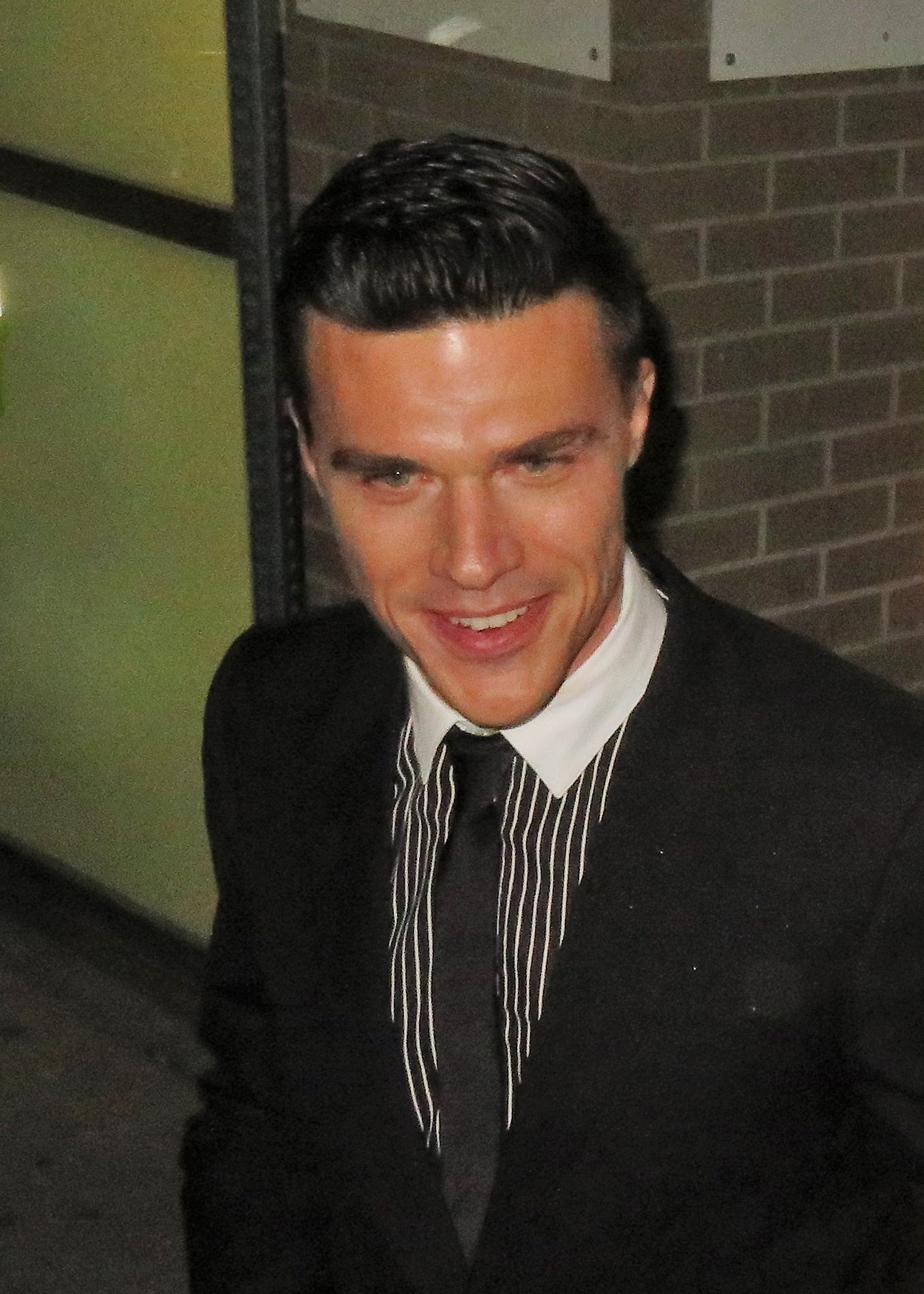
Wittrock in 2019

At the end of high school, Wittrock appeared in guest stints on the police procedural series Cold Case and medical drama ER. He also made an appearance on CSI: Miami and in the Disney Channel Original Movie Halloweentown High (2004) during his time at drama school. After graduating from Juilliard, he portrayed Romeo in Washington, D.C.'s regional theatre, the Shakespeare Theatre Company's production of Romeo and Juliet, as well as playing the role of Eugene Marchbanks in the 2008 production of Candida at the Berkshire Theatre Festival. He later portrayed Damon Miller in the long-running series All My Children from 2009 to 2011, portrayed Troilus in the 2009 Off-Broadway play The Age of Iron, and appeared in the teen drama film Twelve (2010).

In 2011, Wittrock starred in the Off-Broadway play The Illusion by famous playwright Tony Kushner. Director Mike Nichols came to see the play and later told Wittrock to audition for producer Scott Rudin for their upcoming revival of Arthur Miller's Death of a Salesman. He got the part of Harold "Happy" Loman and made his Broadway debut in 2012 opposite Philip Seymour Hoffman. The Nichols-directed play won the Tony Award for Best Revival of a Play and Wittrock won a Theatre World Award and the Clarence Derwent Award for Most Promising Male Performer. Later that year, he starred in a production of The Blue Deep at the Williamstown Theatre Festival directed by Bob Balaban. He also appeared on series such as Harry's Law, Criminal Minds and played the role of gigolo Chance Wayne in the David Cromer-directed production of Tennessee Williams' play Sweet Bird of Youth at The Goodman Theatre

In 2013, he starred in the play adaptation of the film The Guardsman at The Kennedy Center, directed by Gregory Mosher. He also guest-starred on Law & Order: Special Victims Unit and on several episodes of the series Masters of Sex.

In 2014, Wittrock first collaborated with director Ryan Murphy in the HBO television film The Normal Heart, based on the play of the same name. He also appeared in the films Winter's Tale and director Darren Aronofsky's Noah, playing a young Tubal-cain. He next collaborated with Murphy playing the integral part of the wealthy Dandy Mott on American Horror Story: Freak Show, the fourth season of the FX anthology series American Horror Story for which he was a series regular. For his performance, Wittrock received a nomination for the Primetime Emmy Award for Outstanding Supporting Actor in a Miniseries or a Movie. Wittrock rounded out 2014 by starring as World War II Air Force bombardier Francis "Mac" McNamara in Angelina Jolie's biographical war drama film Unbroken, which revolves around the life of USA Olympian and athlete Louis "Louie" Zamperini.

In 2015, Wittrock marked his third collaboration with Murphy as model Tristan Duffy and actor Rudolph Valentino in the fifth installment of American Horror Story, subtitled Hotel. Also in 2015, he co-starred in Adam McKay's drama film The Big Short. In 2016, Wittrock had a small role in the musical La La Land, directed by Damien Chazelle, and released in December. He co-stars as Cassio alongside Daniel Craig and David Oyelowo in the Sam Gold-directed production of William Shakespeare's Othello, which started its run on December 12 at the New York Theatre Workshop.

In 2017, Wittrock returned to Broadway, in the Sam Gold-directed production of Tennessee Williams' play The Glass Menagerie, opposite Sally Field and Joe Mantello. The play opened on March 23, 2017 and closed on July 2, 2017. That year, Wittrock also appeared in Gillian Robespierre's comedy film Landline. In 2018, he briefly played actor Tim Matheson in David Wain's comedy A Futile and Stupid Gesture.

In August 2018, he starred with Kristen Stewart in the music video for Indie band Interpol's music video for "If You Really Love Nothing".

Wittrock co-starred as Judy Garland's fifth and final husband Mickey Deans in the biopic Judy (2019), directed by Rupert Goold. In January 2019, it was announced that Wittrock will star in the upcoming Netflix drama series Ratched, as well as appearing in one episode of American Horror Story: 1984.

In April 2021, Wittrock had officially been cast as Guy Gardner for the HBO Max live action television series based on Green Lantern. In July 2022, the series was confirmed to have been undergoing rewrites, and the start of production had been delayed. In an interview, Wittrock claimed that the series was still in production. In January 2023 the DC Studios co-president James Gunn, announced a new slate of projects that would serve as a reboot of the DC Extended Universe. Among these projects was a Green Lantern series titled Lanterns. This series was going to be focused on the Hal Jordan version of Green Lantern. It was unknown at the time whether or not Wittrock was still involved. It was speculated that the majority of actors involved in the DCEU would be recast, and that all prior plans for DC in film or TV had been cancelled, leading to some backlash from fans. In July 2023 Gunn announced that he had chosen to cast frequent collaborator Nathan Fillion as the Guy Gardner character, effectively replacing Wittrock.

In 2024, Wittrock appeared in the autobiographical documentary Steve! (martin): a documentary in two pieces on Apple TV. In it, he plays Steve Martin's father, Glenn, in a skit based on Martin's play WASP.

== Personal life ==
On October 18, 2014, Wittrock married his longtime girlfriend and fellow Juilliard graduate, Sarah Roberts, in a private ceremony. In March 2019, the couple had a son, Jude.

== Filmography ==
=== Film ===
Year	Title	Role	Notes
2002	Le Dernier Tour	Tigo	Short film
2010	Twelve	Warren	
2014	Winter's Tale	Gabriel	
2014	Noah	Young Tubal-cain	
2014	Unbroken	Francis "Mac" McNamara	
2015	My All American	Freddie Steinmark	
2015	The Submarine Kid	Spencer Koll	
2015	The Big Short	Jamie Shipley	
2016	La La Land	Greg Earnest	
2017	Landline	Nate	
2017	A Midsummer Night's Dream	Demetrius	
2018	A Futile and Stupid Gesture	Tim Matheson	
2018	Write When You Get Work	Jonny Collins	
2018	If Beale Street Could Talk	Hayward	
2019	Locating Silver Lake	Seth	
2019	Plus One	Steve	
2019	The Last Black Man in San Francisco	Clayton	
2019	Big Boy Pants	Kyle	Short film
2019	Judy	Mickey Deans	
2019	Semper Fi	"Jaeger"	
2021	Long Weekend	Bart	
2021	A Mouthful of Air	Ethan Davis	
2022	Deep Water	Tony Cameron	
2022	Luckiest Girl Alive	Luke Harrison	
2023	Downtown Owl	Coach Laidlaw	
2023	Origin	August Landmesser	
2024	Don't Move	Richard	
2025	Westhampton	Tom Bell	
2026	All That She Wants		Post-production
2026	Hershey	Milton S. Hershey	Post-production
TBA	Trust the Man	TBA	Post-production

=== Television ===
Year	Title	Role	Notes
2003	Cold Case	Eric Whitley (1976)	Episode: "Look Again"
2003	ER	Thomas Yoder	Episode: "Missing"
2004	CSI: Miami	Chad Van Horn	Episode: "Murder in a Flash"
2004	Halloweentown High	Cody Trainer	Television film
2009–2011	All My Children	Damon Miller	112 episodes
2011	Torchwood: Miracle Day	Danny	Episode: "Rendition"
2012	Harry's Law	Jimmy Cormack	Episode: "New Kidney on the Block"
2012	Criminal Minds	Harvey Morell	Episode: "True Genius"
2013	Law & Order: Special Victims Unit	Cameron Tyler	Episode: "Wonderland Story"
2013	Masters of Sex	Dale	4 episodes
2014	The Normal Heart	Albert	Television film
2014–2015	American Horror Story: Freak Show	Dandy Mott	12 episodes
2015	Deadbeat	Max	Episode: "The Polaroid Flasher"
2015–2016	American Horror Story: Hotel	Tristan Duffy	6 episodes
2015–2016	American Horror Story: Hotel	Rudolph Valentino	3 episodes
2016	American Horror Story: Roanoke	Jether Polk	2 episodes
2018	The Assassination of Gianni Versace: American Crime Story	Jeffrey Trail	4 episodes
2019	Alternatino with Arturo Castro	Eddie	Episode: "The Dreamer"
2019	American Horror Story: 1984	Bobby Richter	Episode: "Final Girl"
2020	Cake	Himself	Episode: "Forbidden Love"
2020	Ratched	Edmund Tolleson	Main role
2021	American Horror Story: Double Feature	Harry Gardner	6 episodes
2024	Steve! (Martin): A Documentary in 2 Pieces	Glenn Martin	Episode: "Now"

=== Stage ===
Year	Title	Role	Notes
2008	Candida	Eugene Marchbanks	Berkshire Theatre Festival
2008	Romeo and Juliet	Romeo Montague	Shakespeare Theatre Company
2009	The Age of Iron	Troilus	Classic Stage Company
2011	The Illusion	Calisto / Clindor / Theogenes	Signature Theatre Company
2012	Death of a Salesman	Harold "Happy" Loman	Ethel Barrymore Theatre
2012	The Blue Deep	Jamie	Williamstown Theatre Festival
2012	Sweet Bird of Youth	Chance Wayne	The Goodman Theatre
2013	The Guardsman	The Actor	The Kennedy Center
2016	Othello	Michael Cassio	New York Theatre Workshop
2017	The Glass Menagerie	Jim O'Connor	Belasco Theatre
2022	2:22	Sam	Ahmanson Theatre

=== Music videos ===
Year	Artist	Title	Role	Ref.
2025	Ava Max	Lost Your Faith	Male lead	

== Awards and nominations ==
Organizations	Year (Note: Indicates the year of the ceremony.)	Category	Work	Result
Critics' Choice Movie Awards	2016	Best Acting Ensemble	The Big Short	Nominated
Critics' Choice Super Awards	2021	Best Villain in a Series	Ratched	Nominated
Critics' Choice Television Awards	2015	Best Supporting Actor in a Movie/Miniseries	American Horror Story: Freak Show	Nominated
Critics' Choice Television Awards	2019	Best Supporting Actor in a Movie/Miniseries	The Assassination of Gianni Versace: American Crime Story	Nominated
Clarence Derwent Awards	2012	Most Promising Male Performer	Death of a Salesman	Won
Dorian Awards	2015	We're Wilde About You Rising Star Award	Himself	Nominated
Fangoria Chainsaw Awards	2015	Favorite Supporting Actor on Television	American Horror Story: Freak Show	Nominated
National Board of Review Awards	2015	Best Ensemble	The Big Short	Won
Primetime Emmy Awards	2015	Outstanding Supporting Actor in a Limited Series or a Movie	American Horror Story: Freak Show	Nominated
Primetime Emmy Awards	2018	Outstanding Supporting Actor in a Limited Series or a Movie	The Assassination of Gianni Versace: American Crime Story	Nominated
Satellite Awards	2019	Best Cast – Television Series	The Assassination of Gianni Versace: American Crime Story	Won
Screen Actors Guild Awards	2016	Outstanding Performance by a Cast in a Motion Picture	The Big Short	Nominated
Theatre World Awards	2012	Theatre World Award	Death of a Salesman	Won
Washington D.C. Area Film Critics Association	2015	Best Ensemble	The Big Short	Won
