= Camp Redwood (American Horror Story) =

- American Horror Story episode
- Episode no.: Season 9 Episode 1
- Directed by: Bradley Buecker
- Written by: Ryan Murphy & Brad Falchuk
- Production code: 9ATS01
- Original air date: September 18, 2019
- Running time: 48 minutes

Guest appearances
- DeRon Horton as Ray Powell; Orla Brady as Dr. Karen Hopple; Mitch Pileggi as Art Sawyer; Lou Taylor Pucci as Jonas Shevoore; Don Swayze as Ed Gibson; Tara Karsian as Chef Bertie Clifford

Episode chronology
← Previous "Apocalypse Then"	Next → "Mr. Jingles"
- American Horror Story: 1984

"Camp Redwood" is the first episode and season premiere of the ninth season of the anthology television series American Horror Story. It aired on September 18, 2019, on the cable network FX. The episode was written by Ryan Murphy & Brad Falchuk, and directed by Bradley Buecker.

== Plot ==
In 1970, three camp counselors are about to have a threesome in a cabin but one of the female counselors hears jingling. A mysterious figure enters, and the trio are stabbed to death. As the scene opens more widely, it reveals the sleeping campers have also been killed.

In 1984, Xavier Plympton leads an aerobics class for Montana Duke, Ray Powell, Chet Clancy, and Brooke Thompson. Xavier describes the terror that the Night Stalker is wreaking on Los Angeles and says he is escaping to the re-opening Camp Redwood to avoid the murders. The others are convinced to join him as counselors at the camp. Brooke declines at first but relents after she is assaulted in her home by a man claiming to be the Night Stalker. The next morning, the group goes on a road trip to Camp Redwood. At a rest stop, the gas station attendant, Ed, warns the group that they are going to die; after discovering they are headed to the camp. The group's vehicle hits a man lying in the road. The group agrees to take him with them to get him medical attention.

The camp's owner, Margaret Booth, instructs them to take the injured man to the infirmary, where the camp's nurse, Rita, tends to him. Margaret takes the counselors on a tour and explains the rules. They encounter Chef Bertie Clifford, an original camp counselor who volunteered to re-open the camp with Margaret. That night, the counselors gather around a fire, and Rita tells them of the incident that closed the camp 14 years before. The accused killer was Benjamin Richter, aka Mr. Jingles, a Vietnam veteran who was discharged dishonorably. Rita claims there were 10 victims, but Margaret approaches and corrects her that there were only nine; she was the sole survivor. She was the star witness at Jingles' trial, and he was sent to a mental institution. Brooke finds the amnesiac man awake and guides him back to bed. He is confused about the camp reopening and warns her that something bad is going to happen. Trevor Kirchner, the activities director, arrives in their cabin. Later, he and Montana begin a sexual encounter in the lake but are interrupted when Montana sees approaching car headlights at the edge of the lake.

At a facility for the criminally insane, Dr. Hopple is informed that Richter has escaped. Three hours earlier, Richter, in his cell, lured in an orderly, whom he strangled to death. Hopple finds a newspaper clipping in the cell announcing the reopening of the camp. The same gas station attendant from earlier, Ed, is repairing a car from underneath, and Richter crushes him by lowering the jacks. Richter takes his truck and drives to the camp. In the infirmary, Brooke finds the amnesiac man impaled on a hook and is pursued by Richter. She reaches the others, but they do not believe her; the hiker's body is missing when they investigate. Unable to sleep, Brooke hears the pay phone ringing (despite the hiker having said earlier the lines were down). She answers it and hears the jingling of keys, while being observed by the Night Stalker from afar.

== Reception ==
"Camp Redwood" was watched by 2.13 million people during its original broadcast and gained a 1.0 ratings share among adults aged 18–49.

The episode received largely positive reviews. On the review aggregator Rotten Tomatoes, "Camp Redwood" holds a 94% approval rating, based on 32 reviews with an average rating of 8.61/10. The critical consensus reads: "An ode to the 80s horror genre, 'Camp Redwood' settles in to the classic backdrop with a stellar cast, leaving the door open for an ambitious season."

Ron Hogan of Den of Geek gave the episode a 5/5, saying, "The script is bolstered by solid performances all around, and Bradley Buecker's strong direction reinforces both positive aspects of the show. The opening credits are a thing of '80s beauty, and Buecker must have been studying the '80s slasher playbook because he nails the tone and shooting style, right down to recreation of some of the flaws of the genre." He concluded his review by adding, "As solidly as Roanoke nailed reality television, 1984 nails the slasher sub-genre. For the most part, it avoids winking at the camera, Matthew Morrison's Trevor aside, and the episode works as a great setup for what's to come."

Kat Rosenfield from Entertainment Weekly gave the episode a B+. She criticized the writing, saying, "Ryan Murphy appropriated the writing budget... and spent it all on thong leotards, shimmer stockings, and sleeveless polyester turtlenecks," but she enjoyed the performances and look of the cast. She also noted and appreciated the references to classic horror films, citing I Know What You Did Last Summer, and calls the scene where Ramirez attacks Brooke "creepy". She ended her review by giving a positive opinion about the episode cliffhanger, commenting, "Because it’s 1984! Excess is in!"

Matt Fowler of IGN gave the episode an 8.1 out of 10 and wrote, "American Horror Story: 1984 kicks things off with a story designed to dive back into '80s horror and remind us how fun and freaky the slasher genre can be. For the first time in a while, a bunch of decent (ish) characters are up on the chopping block, instead of the show's usual parade of vicious and cruel creeps. This suggests the season won't be a harsh hornet's nest full of nasty nightmares, like many previous installments have been, but instead a medium-spicy ride full of crowd-pleasing chills."
