= Slashdance =

- American Horror Story episode
- Episode no.: Season 9 Episode 3
- Directed by: Mary Wigmore
- Written by: James Wong
- Production code: 9ATS03
- Original air date: October 2, 2019
- Running time: 40 minutes

Guest appearances
- DeRon Horton as Ray Powell; Orla Brady as Dr. Karen Hopple; Mitch Pileggi as Art Sawyer; Dreama Walker as Nurse Rita; Mark Daugherty as Chan; Sean Liang as Wide Load

Episode chronology
← Previous "Mr. Jingles"	Next → "True Killers"
- American Horror Story: 1984

"Slashdance" is the third episode of the ninth season of the anthology television series American Horror Story. It aired on October 2, 2019, on the cable network FX. The episode was written by James Wong, and directed by Mary Wigmore.

== Plot ==
The episode picks up immediately where the previous one left off, as serial killer Richard Ramirez corners Brooke, Chet, Rita, and Ray in the nurse's cabin. Ray abandons the group, only to be attacked and is rescued by Chet, while Brooke and Rita manage to escape to the parking lot; however, Rita knocks Brooke unconscious by drugging her and Rita is revealed to be a fraud. She is really Donna Chambers, a young psychologist obsessed with studying serial killers, such as Richter and Ramirez.

In a flashback, Donna is able to persuade Dr. Hopple to let her study Richter and is revealed to have assisted him in his escape from Red Meadows. Donna then abducted the real Rita, a nurse employed by Margaret, stealing her identity in order to observe Richter's potential murder spree at the camp. In the present, Montana, Xavier, and Trevor are attacked by a group of unseen assailants, revealed to be devotees of Richter. The real Richter proceeds to murder the devotees, while the counselors escape. Richter spares one of the devotees, nicknamed Wide Load, when he is able to sympathize with him.

Ramirez pursues Ray and Chet through the forest, causing them to fall into a pit filled with spikes, leaving Chet seriously injured. A guilty Ray confesses to playing a role in the death of a fraternity pledge when he believes Chet is dead, having joined the others at Camp Redwood to escape conviction; Chet is revealed to have survived the fall, having heard Ray's confession. Montana, Xavier, and Trevor take refuge in a nearby shed, only to discover the real Rita. They free her and she attempts to escape, but is promptly murdered by Richter.

Ray manages to climb out of the pit and abandons Chet to his own devices, before running into Montana, Xavier, and Trevor. Trevor gives Ray the keys to his motorcycle, sending him and Montana to call for help at a nearby phone booth. Xavier and Trevor discover Chet in the pit and pull him out, before accidentally killing Wide Load. Ramirez appears and ambushes Ray and Montana, and Ray abandons Montana. Ray is subsequently decapitated by Richter in his attempt to escape.

Montana momentarily struggles with Ramirez, only for the pair to share a kiss. Montana wonders aloud to Ramirez why he has not killed "her" yet, leaving the episode on a cliffhanger.

== Reception ==
"Slashdance" was watched by 1.34 million people during its original broadcast, and gained a 0.6 ratings share among adults aged 18–49.

The episode has been critically acclaimed. On the review aggregator Rotten Tomatoes, "Slashdance" holds an 94% approval rating, based on 17 reviews with an average rating of 8/10. The critical consensus reads: "1984 delivers its best episode yet in a mind-blowing installment stuffed to the brim with endless reveals -- a fine return to AHS form."

Ron Hogan of Den of Geek gave the episode a 4/5, saying, "Mary Wigmore tends to play up the comedy in the episode, with a lot of the one-liners and asides given extra weight thanks to the actors' delivery and the way the scenes are set up, but she also displays some adept timing in the more horrifying moments." He concluded by commenting, "The redshirts die swiftly. The betrayals are brutal. 1984 plays with the tropes and traditions of slasher movies and doesn't skimp on the staples of the genre, like flying decapitated [sic] heads and people being impaled on things. With the nimbleness of a dancer, American Horror Story is able to both satisfy the tropes and play with the tropes simultaneously. Slasher movies, for the right audience, are a lot of fun, and American Horror Story: 1984 is not short on the depraved sense of humor necessary to make a dumb 80's pastiche work. Watching fictional characters die is rarely so much fun."

Kat Rosenfield of Entertainment Weekly gave the episode a B rating. She enjoyed the characters' backstories as revealed in the episode, as well as the plot twists, and particularly liked the revelation about Rita, qualifying it as "a shades-of-Valerie-Solanas theory about serial killers being on the rise because of porn, misogyny, and the Vietnam war." Rosenfield did not enjoy the introduction of the Mr. Jingles imitators, commenting that they were "pathetic." She also criticized the development of Ray's character, to the point that "it is hard not to cheer just a little bit" when he is killed by Mr. Jingles. However, she concluded her review by praising the cliffhanger of the episode as "a big WTF moment."

Variety's Andrea Reiher gave the episode a positive review, concluding with, "Can't wait to see what American Horror Story throws at us next week!"
