= Downtown Owl (film) =

2023 film by Lily Rabe and Hamish Linklater

- Release poster
- Directed by: Lily Rabe; Hamish Linklater
- Screenplay by: Hamish Linklater
- Based on: Downtown Owl by Chuck Klosterman
- Produced by: Lily Rabe; Hamish Linklater; Bettina Barrow; Rebecca Green
- Starring: Lily Rabe; Ed Harris; Vanessa Hudgens; August Blanco Rosenstein; Jack Dylan Grazer; Finn Wittrock; Henry Golding
- Cinematography: Barton Cortright
- Edited by: Nena Erb
- Music by: T Bone Burnett
- Production companies: Stage 6 Films; Kill Claudio; TPC; Esme Grace
- Distributed by: Sony Pictures Releasing
- Release dates: June 8, 2023 (Tribeca Festival); April 23, 2024 (United States)
- Running time: 88 minutes
- Country: United States
- Language: English

Downtown Owl is a 2023 American comedy drama film directed by Lily Rabe and Hamish Linklater, in their directorial debuts, from a screenplay by Linklater. It is based on the 2008 novel by Chuck Klosterman. The film is produced by Rabe, Bettina Barrow, Linklater (in his debut production), and Rebecca Green under Kill Claudio Productions, Three Point Capital and Esme Grace Media, in association with Stage 6 Films. It stars Rabe, Ed Harris, Vanessa Hudgens, August Blanco Rosenstein, Jack Dylan Grazer, Finn Wittrock, and Henry Golding.

Downtown Owl premiered at the Tribeca Festival on June 8, 2023. It was released in the United States on April 23, 2024.

== Premise ==
Set in 1983, in the fictional town of Owl, North Dakota, the story centers around three intangibly connected residents—Horace, an old man who spends his afternoons reminiscing better times from the past at the local coffee shop, Mitch, a depressed high school backup quarterback, and Julia, an English teacher at the local high school who recently moved to Owl—whose lives, along with those of the town’s other residents, are upended by a whiteout blizzard.

== Cast ==
- Lily Rabe as Julia Rabia
- Ed Harris as Horace Jones
- Vanessa Hudgens as Naomi
- August Blanco Rosenstein as Mitch Hrlicka
- Jack Dylan Grazer as Eli Zebra
- Arianna Jaffier as Rebecca Grooba
- Finn Wittrock as Coach Laidlaw
- Henry Golding as Vance Druid

In addition, Arden Michalec portrays Tina McAndrew, while the film's screenwriter and co-director, Hamish Linklater, has a cameo as Principal Valentine.

== Production ==
In October 2012, it was announced Adam Scott and Naomi Scott had optioned rights to Downtown Owl by Chuck Klosterman for a planned film adaption to produce under their Gettin Rad Productions banner.

In April 2022, it was announced Lily Rabe, Ed Harris, Vanessa Hudgens, Finn Wittrock, and Jack Dylan Grazer had joined the cast of the film, with Rabe directing and producing alongside Hamish Linklater who wrote the screenplay, and her producing partner Bettina Barrow under their banner, Kill Claudio Productions with Sony Pictures' Stage 6 Films overseeing production and Sony Pictures Releasing set to distribute. The film was a part of the Sundance Institute's Feature Film Program and Creative Producing Initiative under the organization's Creative Producing Summit and Talent Forum. It was also announced that T Bone Burnett had signed on to compose the film score, and Rebecca Green and Michael Melamedoff were co-producing under Three Point Capital and Esme Grace Media. The following day, it was revealed that Henry Golding had joined the cast of the film.

Principal photography took place throughout April 2022, in Minnesota. Filming took place in Saint Paul, Independence, and Elko New Market.

== Reception ==
On the review aggregator website Rotten Tomatoes, 47% of 17 critics' reviews are positive, with an average rating of 5.1/10. Metacritic, which uses a weighted average, assigned the film a score of 48 out of 100, based on 7 critics, indicating "mixed or average" reviews.
