= Lily Rabe =

American actress (born 1982)

- Rabe in 2026
- Born: June 29, 1982 (age 44); New York City, New York, U.S.
- Education: Northwestern University (BA)
- Occupation: Actress
- Years active: 2001–present
- Partner: Hamish Linklater (2014–present)
- Children: 3
- Parents: David Rabe; Jill Clayburgh

Lily Rabe (born June 29, 1982) is an American actress. She is best known for her multiple roles on the FX anthology horror series American Horror Story (2011–2021). For her performance as Portia in the Broadway production of The Merchant of Venice, she received a nomination for the Tony Award for Best Actress in a Play.

Her film credits include What Just Happened (2008), All Good Things (2010), Pawn Sacrifice (2014), Miss Stevens (2016), Golden Exits (2017), Vice (2018), Fractured (2019), and The Tender Bar (2021). On television, she appeared in the series The Whispers (2015), The Undoing (2020), The Underground Railroad (2021), and The First Lady (2022).

== Early life ==
Rabe was born on New York City's Upper West Side, the daughter of playwright David Rabe and actress Jill Clayburgh. She has a younger brother, Michael, an actor and playwright; and an older paternal half-brother, Jason, a musician. Her father is Roman Catholic, her maternal grandfather was Jewish, and her maternal grandmother was Protestant. Rabe was raised in Bedford, New York, but moved to Lakeville, Connecticut, when she was in seventh grade, where she attended the Hotchkiss School.

Rabe studied dance for ten years. She was teaching ballet at a summer arts program in Connecticut when she was approached by the program's acting instructor, who asked her to perform a monologue in the final production. She read a monologue from the play Crimes of the Heart by Beth Henley. She said, "It was that moment, performing that monologue, that made me think, 'Maybe this is what I wanna do'." She then went on to study acting at Northwestern University, graduating in 2004.

== Career ==
=== Early years ===
In 2001, Rabe made her screen debut opposite her mother Jill Clayburgh in the film Never Again. She made her professional stage debut, again opposite her mother, at the Gloucester Stage Company in Massachusetts. She starred in two one-act plays, Speaking Well of the Dead by Israel Horovitz and The Crazy Girl by Frank Pugliese, roles that enabled her to get an Equity Card. In July 2003, she returned to the Gloucester Stage Company to appear in Proof by David Auburn. That year, she also appeared in the film Mona Lisa Smile. After graduating, she moved back to New York. From September 29 through October 2, 2004, she appeared in White Jesus by Deirdre O'Connor, one of a series of one-act plays presented as The Democracy Project from the Naked Angels Theater Company.

On January 21, 2005, she took part in a workshop production of The Best Little Whorehouse in Texas at the Roundabout Theatre Company, directed by Joe Mantello. She made her Broadway debut as Annelle Dupuy-Desoto in the 2005 revival of Steel Magnolias by Robert Harling, directed by Jason Moore for which she was nominated for a Drama Desk Award. She had been cast in the play Sisters of the Garden, but had to drop out after being cast in Steel Magnolias. From September through to October 2005, she appeared in the American premiere of Colder Than Here by English playwright Laura Wade at the MCC Theater, prompting New York Magazine's Jeremy McCarter to call her performance "one of the best breakthroughs" of 2005. From September to December 2006, she played Ellie Dunn in Roundabout Theatre Company's production of Heartbreak House by George Bernard Shaw. In 2007, she appeared in the film No Reservations.

In August 2007, Rabe appeared in Crimes of the Heart at the Williamstown Theatre Festival, the directorial debut of actress Kathleen Turner. In 2008, the production moved Off-Broadway to the Laura Pels Theatre, where it was staged by the Roundabout Theatre Company and ran from February 14 to April 13. During a rehearsal, a piece of the set fell on Rabe, leaving her with a fractured rib and causing her to miss a week of preview performances; the opening night was changed from February 7 to February 14.

In August 2008, Rabe was cast as a plainclothes cop in the pilot of the HBO 1970s drama Last of the Ninth, written by David Milch and directed by Carl Franklin. In December 2008, it was reported that HBO had decided not to pick it up as a series. That year, Rabe appeared in the films What Just Happened and The Toe Tactic, as well as two episodes of Medium. From January to March 2009, she appeared in the Broadway premiere of Richard Greenberg's 1990 play The American Plan at the Samuel J. Friedman Theatre. In 2010, she made her debut appearance at Shakespeare in the Park in a production of The Merchant of Venice, directed by Daniel J. Sullivan, that ran from June 30 to August 1. Rabe was cast as Portia, which she described as "one of the great female roles." She also co-starred in the 2010 film All Good Things.

=== 2011–present ===
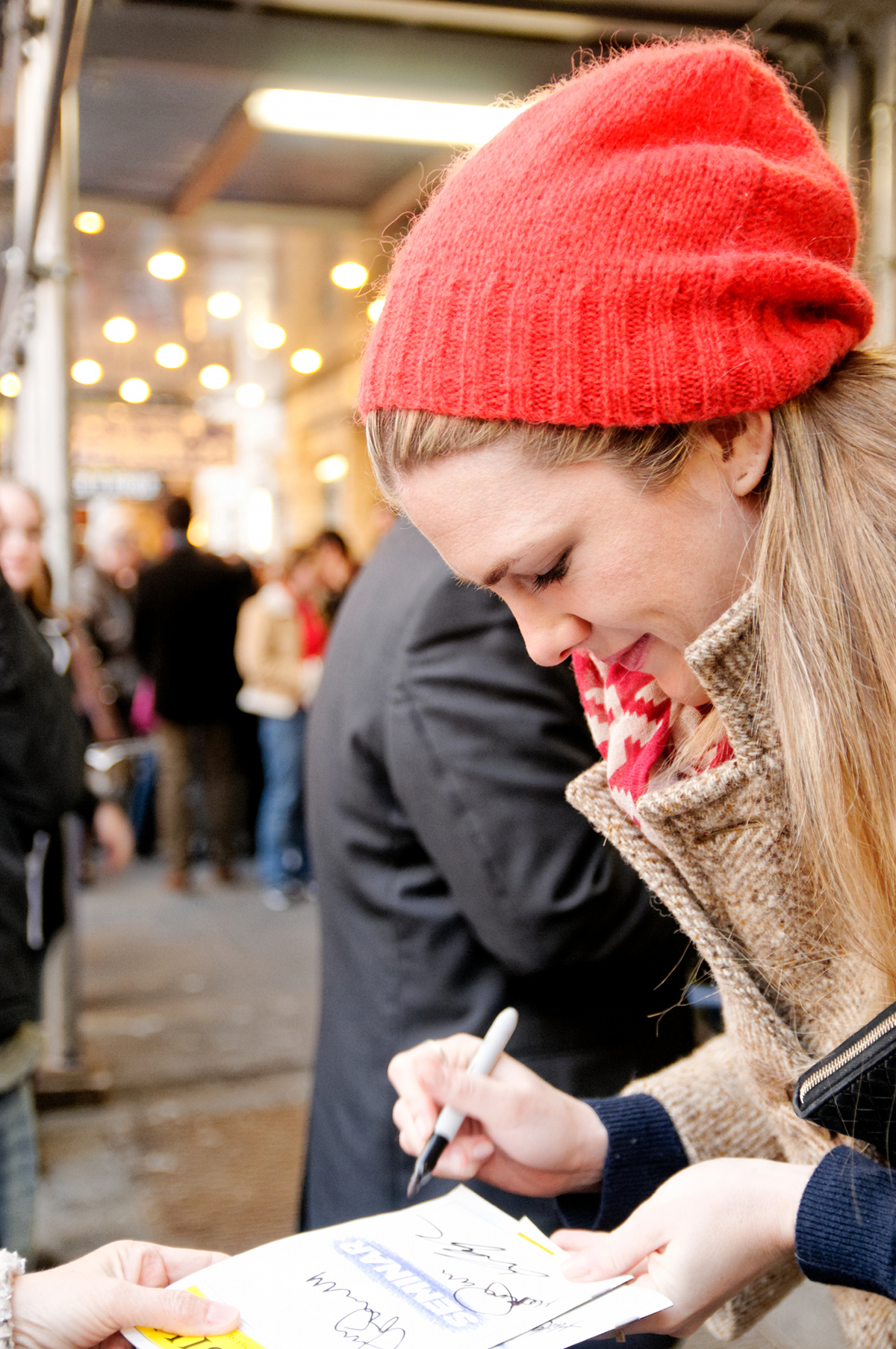
Rabe signing autographs outside Seminar in 2011

Rabe next starred in The Merchant of Venice, opposite Al Pacino as Shylock, in a performance described as a "smashing break-out". The production transferred to Broadway at the Broadhurst Theater, where it ran from October 19, 2010, to February 20, 2011. For her performance, she was nominated for the Tony Award for Best Actress in a Play. In March 2011, she was cast in the FOX drama pilot Exit Strategy. In July, it was confirmed that FOX had passed on the pilot. Rabe appeared again at the Williamstown Theatre Festival in a production of A Doll's House by Henrik Ibsen, where she played Nora Helmer.

In August 2011, Rabe got her first regular role on a television series, as Nora Montgomery on the FX horror series American Horror Story. She was later cast in the second season as the nun Sister Mary Eunice McKee (which she reprised in the fourth season). For the second season, she was nominated for a Critics' Choice Television Award for Best Supporting Actress in a Movie/Miniseries. She was also cast in the third season as a resurgent witch, Misty Day, a role written for her by co-creator Ryan Murphy. In the fifth season, she was a special guest star in the "Devil's Night" episode, playing Aileen Wuornos. In the sixth season, she had a main role as Shelby Miller. Rabe is one of only three actors to appear in the show's first six seasons. In 2019, for the ninth installment of the show, titled 1984, Rabe returned in the recurring role of Lavinia Richter, a distraught mother who haunts Camp Redwood, an idyllic summer retreat with a history of massacre.

Rabe appeared at the Golden Theatre in the Broadway play Seminar by Theresa Rebeck. Directed by Sam Gold, the cast included Alan Rickman, Jerry O'Connell, Hamish Linklater and Hettienne Park. It opened on November 20, 2011 and closed May 6, 2012. In May 2012, it was announced that Rabe would play actress Mary Pickford in The First, a film based on the book Pickford: The Woman Who Made Hollywood by Eileen Whitfield. She finished work in the Public Theater's production of As You Like It, part of the 50th Season of Shakespeare in the Park at the Delacorte Theatre. She played Rosalind in the production that opened on June 11, 2012, and closed on June 30, 2012. In October 2012, it was announced that Rabe would appear in We're Just Married, a film written by her father and directed by Rodrigo Garcia. Rabe was also a producer on the film. In May 2013, she made her Los Angeles stage debut in Miss Julie by August Strindberg, adapted and directed by Neil LaBute. In September 2013, she was cast as Commander Lyme in The Hunger Games: Mockingjay – Part 1 and The Hunger Games: Mockingjay – Part 2, the final two installments of The Hunger Games film series, based on the novels by Suzanne Collins. She was later replaced in the films by Gwendoline Christie due to a scheduling conflict.

On February 14, it was announced that Rabe would appear in Much Ado About Nothing as part of the 2014 Shakespeare in the Park season. The production began on June 3 and ran to July 6. In 2014, she appeared in Pawn Sacrifice, a film biopic about chess player Bobby Fischer, playing Fischer's sister Joan Targ. On February 24, it was announced that Rabe would appear with Thomas Jane and Jessica Alba in horror film The Veil. It was released on January 19, 2016, through video on demand, prior to home-media release on February 2, 2016. That day, it was announced that Rabe would star in The Visitors, a drama pilot for ABC. The pilot was later changed to The Whispers and was officially picked up by ABC in May 2014. The series premiered on June 1, 2015 and was subsequently cancelled on October 19, 2015 after one season. In May 2016, Rabe was cast in Golden Exits directed by Alex Ross Perry.

In August 2021, Rabe starred in the tenth season of American Horror Story, as Doris Gardner in the first half of the season, and as Amelia Earhart in the second. It was her first time as part of the main cast since Roanoke.

In 2026, she starred as Brooke Wyeth in the Broadway revival of Other Desert Cites with Julia Louis-Dreyfus, Ed Harris, Allison Janney and Joe Keery.

== Personal life ==
In December 2016, it was reported that Rabe was expecting her first child with boyfriend Hamish Linklater. She gave birth to a girl in 2017. In June 2020, they had their second daughter. In September 2021, Rabe announced her third pregnancy with Linklater. She gave birth to a son in 2022.

== Credits ==
=== Film ===
Year	Title	Role	Director	Notes	Ref.
2001	Never Again	Tess	Eric Schaeffer		
2003	Mona Lisa Smile	Art History Student	Mike Newell		
2006	A Crime	Sophie	Manuel Pradal		
2007	No Reservations	Bernadette	Scott Hicks		
2008	What Just Happened	Dawn	Barry Levinson		
2008	The Toe Tactic	Mona Peek	Emily Hubley		
2010	Weakness	Katharine Browne	Michael Melamedoff		
2010	All Good Things	Deborah Lehrman	Andrew Jarecki		
2011	Letters from the Big Man	Sarah	Christopher Münch		
2012	Redemption Trail	Anna Cole	Britta Sjogren		
2013	Aftermath	Samantha	Thomas Farone		
2014	Pawn Sacrifice	Joan Fischer	Edward Zwick		
2016	The Veil	Sarah Hope	Phil Joanou		
2016	Miss Stevens	Rachel Stevens	Julia Hart		
2017	Golden Exits	Sam	Alex Ross Perry		
2017	A Midsummer Night's Dream	Helena	Casey Wilder Mott		
2017	The Phantom Menace	Karen	Charlotte Barrett & Sean Fallon	Short film	
2018	Vice	Liz Cheney	Adam McKay		
2019	Sgt. Will Gardner	Mary-Anne Mackey	Max Martini		
2019	Finding Steve McQueen	Sharon Price	Mark Steven Johnson		
2019	Fractured	Joanne Monroe	Brad Anderson		
2021	The Tender Bar	Dorothy Moehringer	George Clooney		
2023	Downtown Owl	Julia	Rabe & Hamish Linklater		
2025	A Big Bold Beautiful Journey	Sarah’s mother	Kogonada		

=== Television ===
Year	Title	Role	Notes	Ref.
2005	Law & Order: Criminal Intent	Siena Boatman	Episode: "Scared Crazy"	
2006	Law & Order: Special Victims Unit	Nikki	Episode: "Recall"	
2008	Nip/Tuck	Lanie Ainge	Episode: "Kyle Ainge"	
2008	Medium	Joanna Wheeler	2 episodes	
2009	Last of the Ninth	Mary Byrne	Unsold TV pilot	
2010	Saving Grace	Sarah Cullen	Episode: "You Can't Save Them All, Grace"	
2010	Law & Order	Andrea Wheaton	Episode: "Crashers"	
2011–2015	The Good Wife	Petra Moritz	3 episodes	
2011	Exit Strategy	Natalie Clayton	Unsold TV pilot	
2011	American Horror Story: Murder House	Nora Montgomery	7 episodes	
2012–2013	American Horror Story: Asylum	Sister Mary Eunice McKee	10 episodes	
2013–2014	American Horror Story: Coven	Misty Day	10 episodes	
2014	American Horror Story: Freak Show	Sister Mary Eunice McKee	Episode: "Orphans"	
2015	The Whispers	Claire Bennigan	13 episodes	
2015	The Walker	Sarah	Episode: "How to Deal with a Frenemy"	
2015–2016	American Horror Story: Hotel	Aileen Wuornos	2 episodes	
2016	American Horror Story: Roanoke	Shelby Miller	10 episodes	
2017	Regular Show in Space	Ailen (voice)	Episode: "Meet the Seer"	
2017	The Wizard of Lies	Catherine Hooper	Television film	
2017–2018	Voltron: Legendary Defender	Honerva (voice)	10 episodes	
2018	Legion	Joan Barrett	Episode: "Chapter 12"	
2018	American Horror Story: Apocalypse	Misty Day	2 episodes	
2019	American Horror Story: 1984	Lavinia Richter	3 episodes	
2020	The Undoing	Sylvia Steineitz	6 episodes	
2021	Tell Me Your Secrets	Emma Hall	10 episodes	
2021	The Underground Railroad	Ethel Wells	2 episodes	
2021	American Horror Story: Double Feature	Doris Gardner	6 episodes	
2021	American Horror Story: Double Feature	Amelia Earhart	2 episodes	
2022	The First Lady	Lorena Hickok	7 episodes	
2023–present	Shrinking	Meg	12 episodes	
2023	Love & Death	Betty Gore	7 episodes	
2024	The Great Lillian Hall	Margaret Tanner	Television film	
2024	Presumed Innocent	Dr. Liz Rush	4 episodes	

=== Stage ===
Year	Title	Role	Ref.
2005	Colder Than Here	Jenna Bradley	
2005	Steel Magnolias	Annelle Dupuy-Desoto	
2006	Heartbreak House	Ellie Dunn	
2008	Crimes of the Heart	Babe Botrelle	
2009	The American Plan	Lili Adler	
2010–2011	The Merchant of Venice	Portia	
2011–2012	Seminar	Kate	
2011	A Doll's House	Nora Helmer	
2012	As You Like It	Rosalind	
2013	Miss Julie	Miss Julie	
2014	Much Ado About Nothing	Beatrice	
2015	Cymbeline	Imogen	
2025	Ghosts	Mrs. Helen Alving	
2026	The Winter's Tale	Hermione	
2026	Other Desert Cities	Brooke Wyeth	

=== Podcasts ===
Year	Title	Role	Director	Notes	Ref.
2024	Sanctuary	Reya	Matt Altman	Fiction podcast produced by Voyage Media, 8 episodes	

== Awards and nominations ==
Year	Association	Category	Nominated work	Result	Ref.
2005	Drama Desk Awards	Outstanding Featured Actress in a Play	Steel Magnolias	Nominated	
2011	Drama Desk Awards	Outstanding Actress in a Play	The Merchant of Venice	Nominated	
2011	Tony Awards	Best Actress in a Play	The Merchant of Venice	Nominated	
2013	Critics' Choice Television Awards	Best Supporting Actress in a Movie/Miniseries	American Horror Story: Asylum	Nominated	
2016	SXSW Film Festival Awards	Special Jury Recognition for Best Actress	Miss Stevens	Won	
2019	Critics' Choice Movie Awards	Best Acting Ensemble	Vice	Nominated	
2025	Drama Desk Awards	Outstanding Lead Performance in a Play	Ghosts	Nominated	
2025	Lucille Lortel Awards	Outstanding Lead Performer in a Play	Ghosts	Nominated	
