= John J. Gray =

American television writer, producer and director

- Other name: John Gray
- Occupations: Television writer, producer, director
- Years active: 2001–present

John J. Gray is an American television writer, producer and director.

He is well known for his work on FX's American Horror Story.

== Career ==
His career began on Joss Whedon's Angel, as an assistant to Tim Minear. He went on to assist Minear on his further endeavors, including Firefly, The Inside, Dollhouse, Terriers, and The Chicago Code. He is an executive producer on American Horror Story (created by Ryan Murphy and Brad Falchuk), and the 9-1-1 franchise created by Ryan Murphy, Brad Falchuk and Tim Minear of 9-1-1 and 9-1-1: Lone Star.
