= American Horror Story: Coven =

Third season of American Horror Story

- Season 3
- Promotional poster and home media cover art
- Showrunner: Ryan Murphy
- Starring: Sarah Paulson; Taissa Farmiga; Frances Conroy; Evan Peters; Lily Rabe; Emma Roberts; Denis O'Hare; Kathy Bates; Jessica Lange
- No. of episodes: 13

Release
- Original network: FX
- Original release: October 9, 2013 – January 29, 2014

Season chronology
- ← Previous; Asylum Next → Freak Show

The third season of the American horror anthology television series American Horror Story, subtitled Coven, is set in 2013 New Orleans and follows a coven of witches descended from Salem as they fight for survival and features flashbacks to the Salem witch trials in 1692, as well as the 1830s, 1910s, 1960s, 1970s, and 1990s. The ensemble cast includes Sarah Paulson, Taissa Farmiga, Frances Conroy, Evan Peters, Lily Rabe, Emma Roberts, Denis O'Hare, Kathy Bates, and Jessica Lange, with all returning from previous seasons, except Roberts and Bates. The season marks the first to not feature cast mainstays Dylan McDermott and Zachary Quinto.

Created by Ryan Murphy and Brad Falchuk for the cable network FX, the series is produced by 20th Century Fox Television. Coven was broadcast between October 9, 2013, to January 29, 2014, consisting of 13 episodes. Like its predecessors, the season was met with both positive reviews and strong ratings, with the premiere attracting a series high of 5.54 million viewers, which, at the time, was the most viewed episode of the series. The season garnered seventeen Primetime Emmy Award nominations, including Outstanding Miniseries. It received nominations for Lange, Paulson, Bassett, Conroy, and Bates at the 66th Primetime Emmy Awards, with Lange and Bates winning their respective categories. In addition, Coven was nominated for Best Miniseries or TV Film at the Golden Globe Awards.

== Cast and characters ==
=== Main ===
Coven main cast

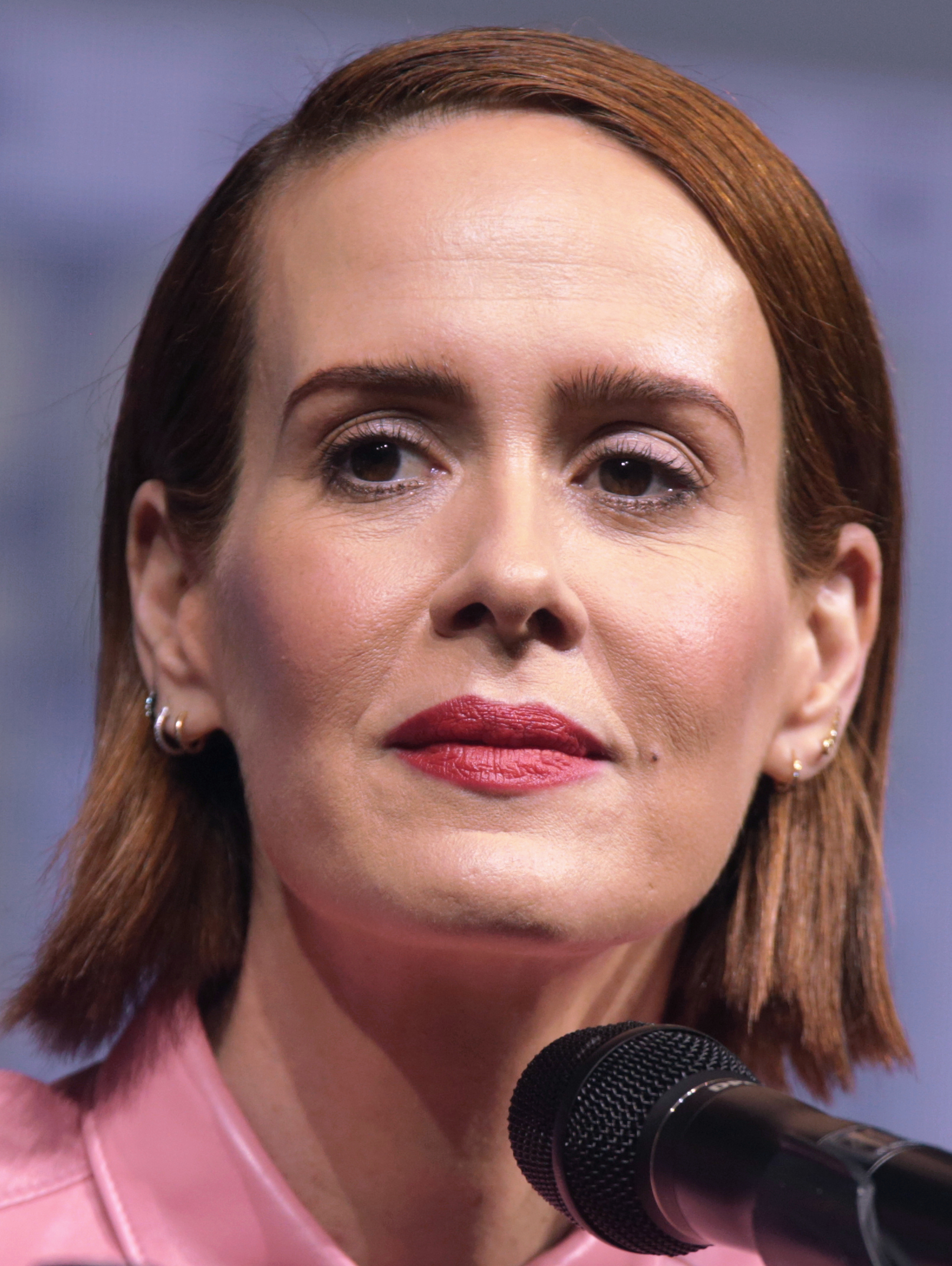
Sarah Paulson

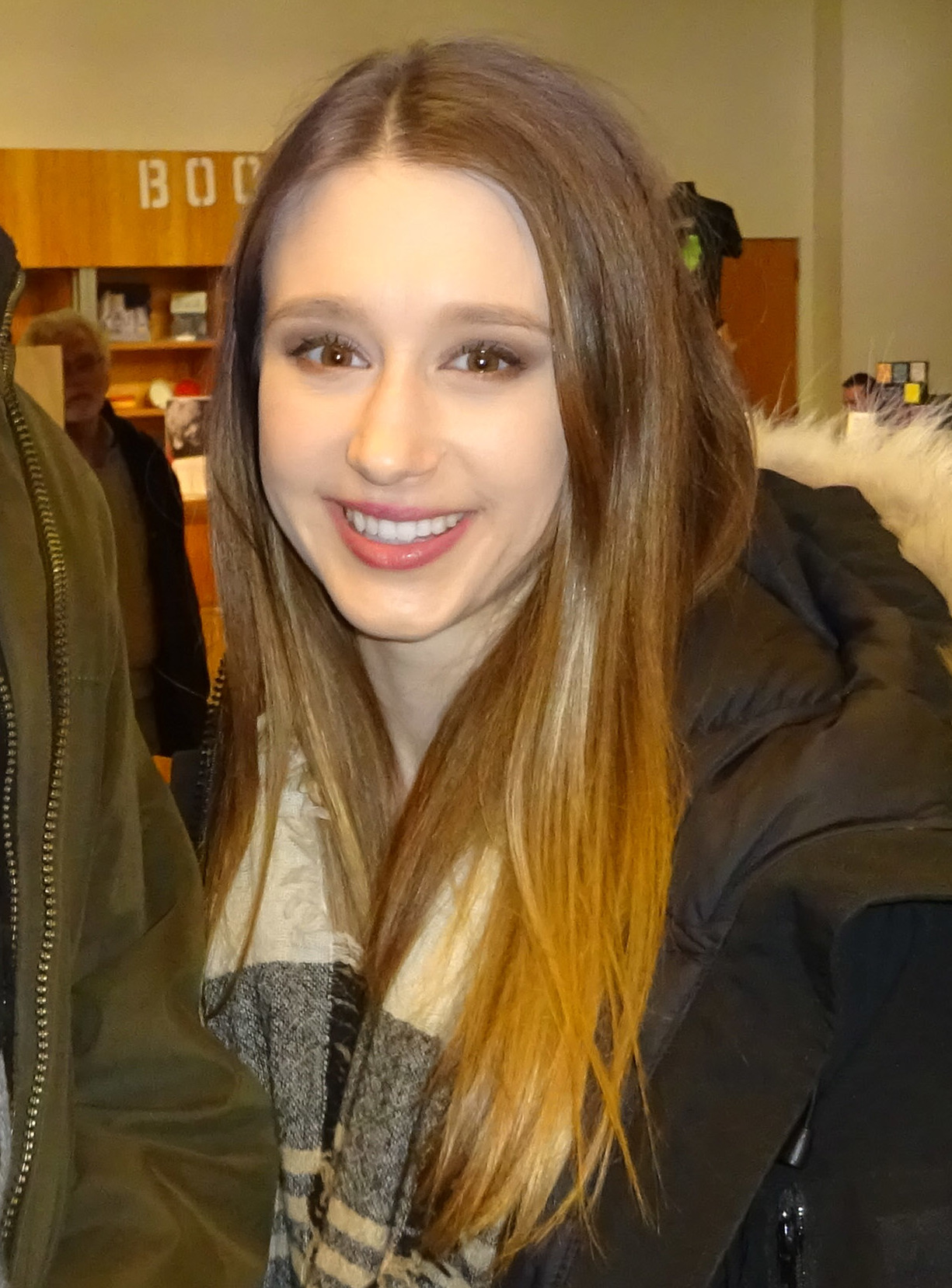
Taissa Farmiga

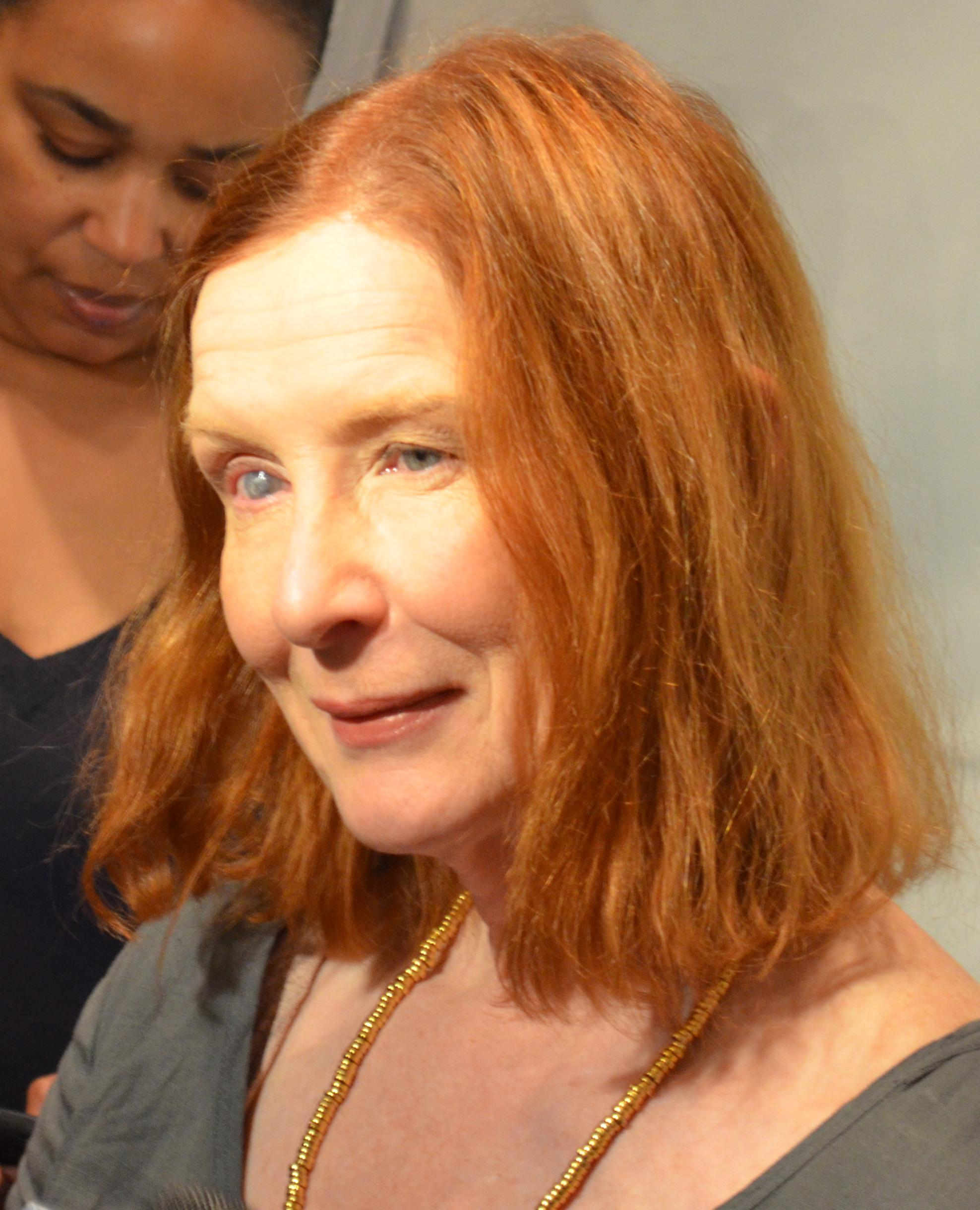
Frances Conroy

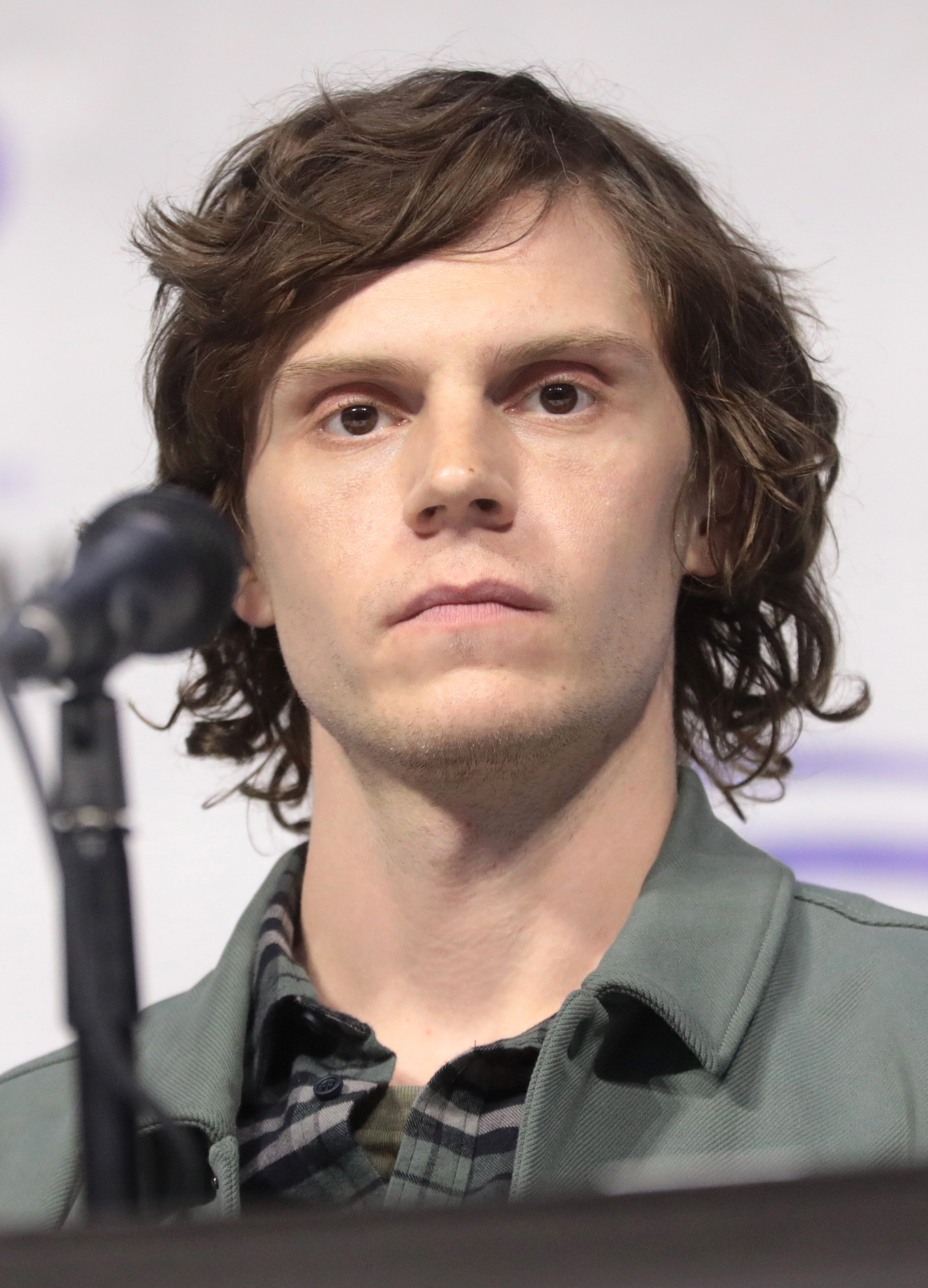
Evan Peters

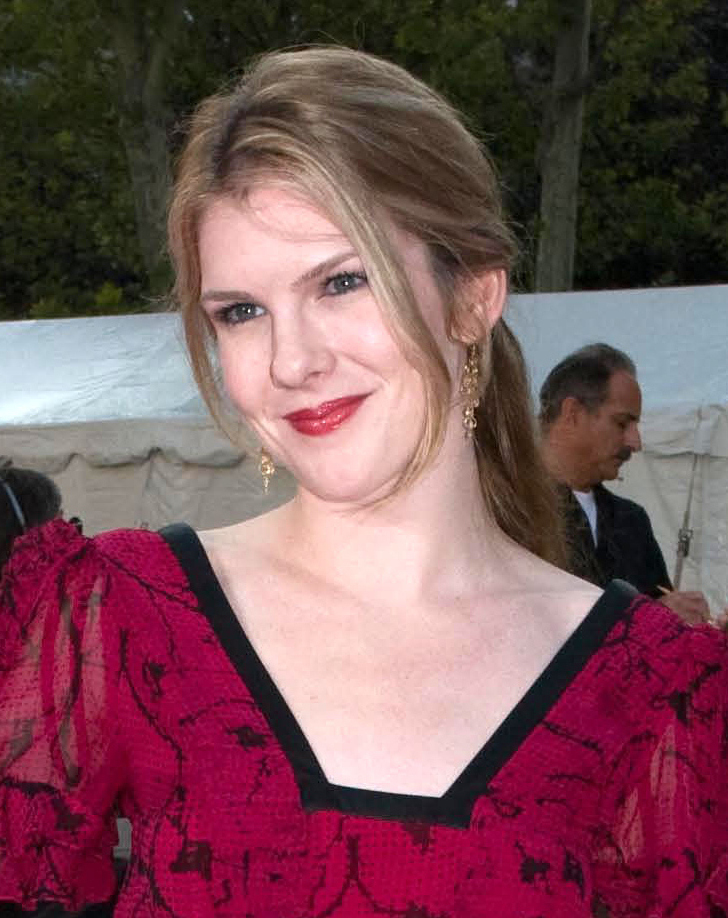
Lily Rabe

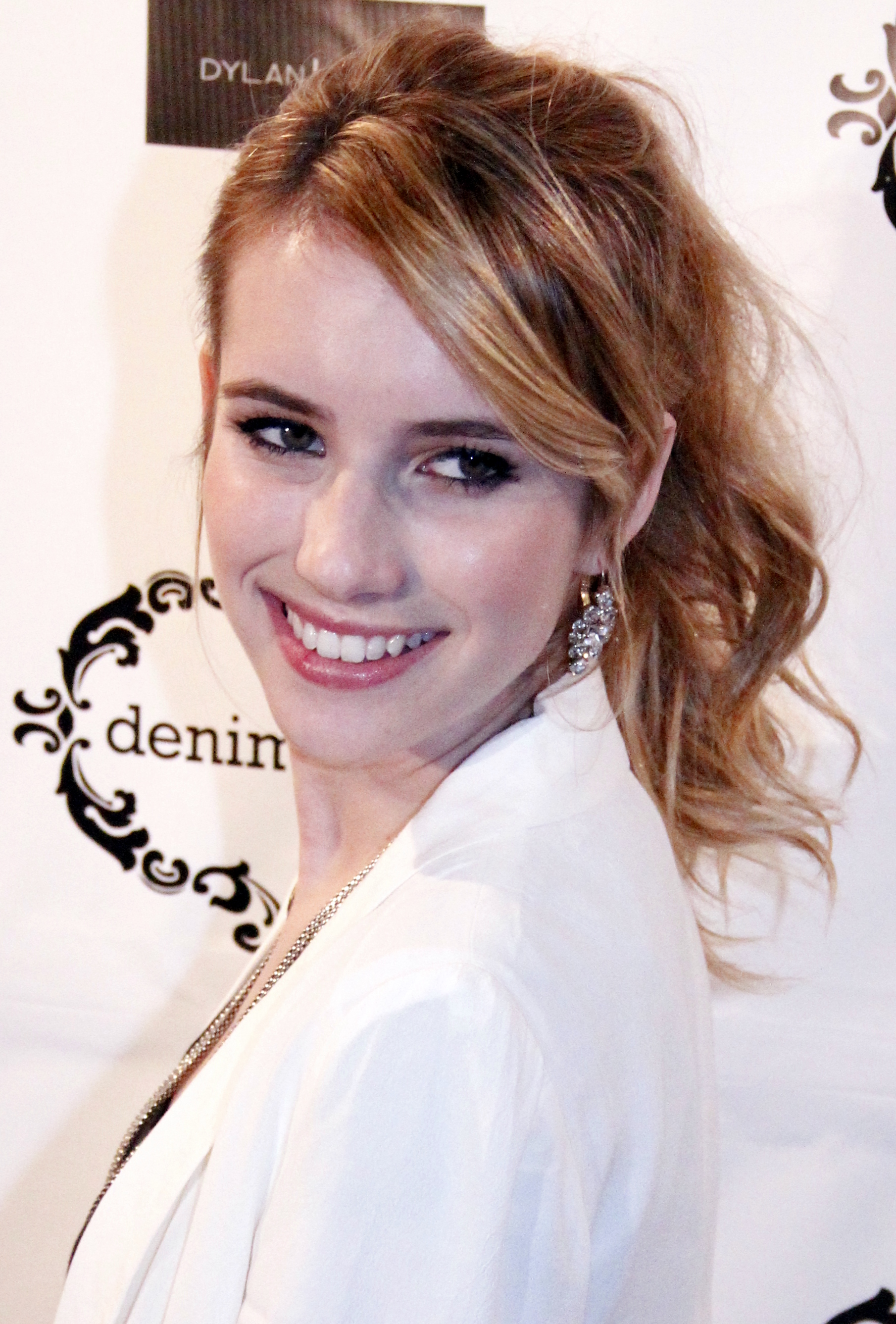
Emma Roberts

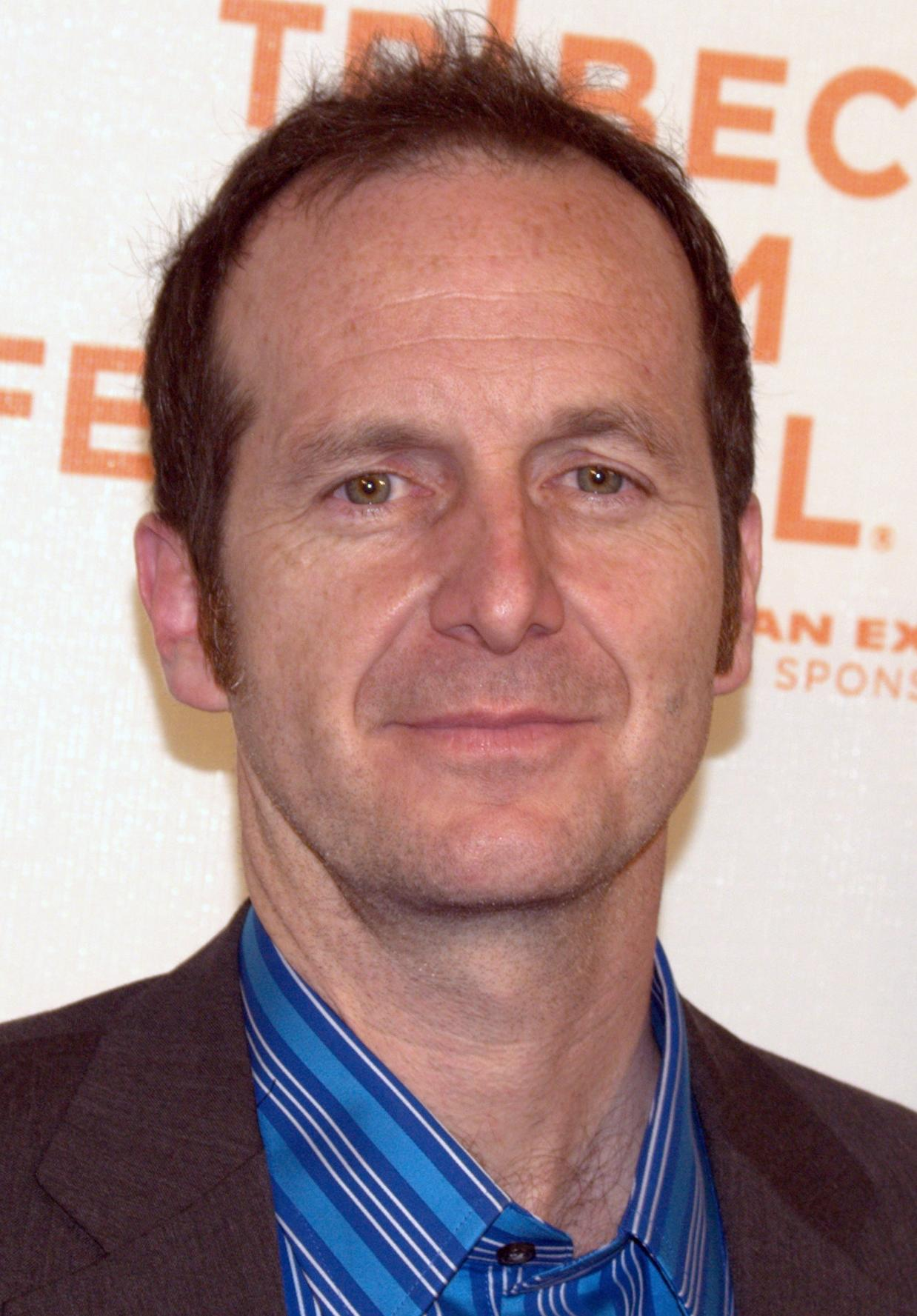
Denis O'Hare

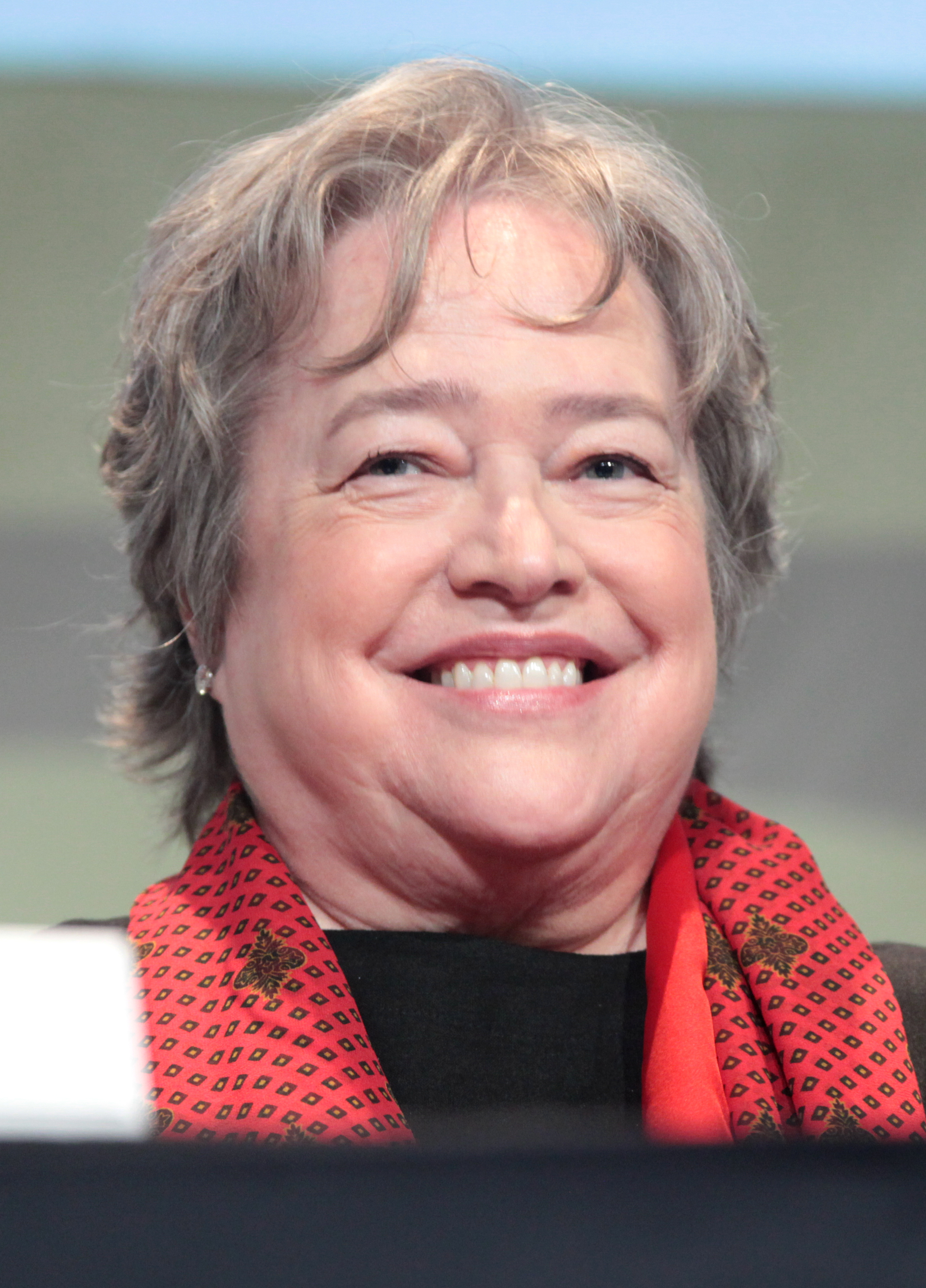
Kathy Bates

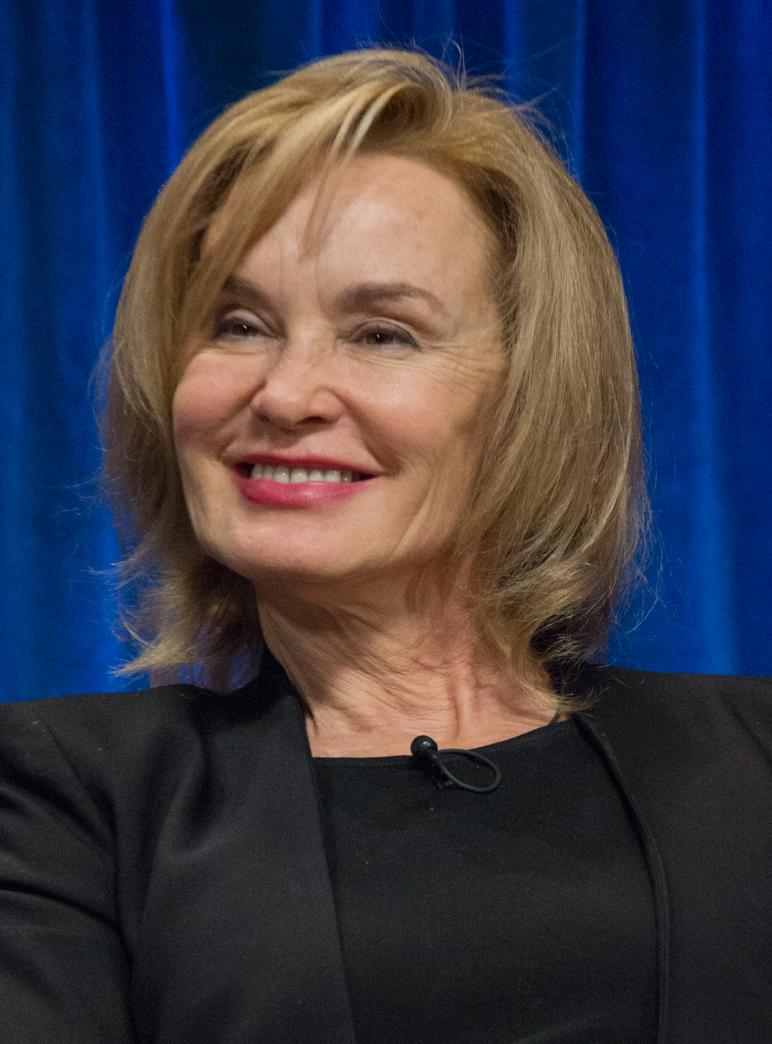
Jessica Lange

- Sarah Paulson as Cordelia Goode (Note: Prior to Apocalypse, her name was 'Cordelia Foxx' due to her marriage with Hank Foxx.)
- Taissa Farmiga as Zoe Benson
- Frances Conroy as Myrtle Snow
- Evan Peters as Kyle Spencer
- Lily Rabe as Misty Day
- Emma Roberts as Madison Montgomery
- Denis O'Hare as Spalding (Note: The character's full name is retroactively revealed to be Otis Spalding Van Wirt in the first episode of the second season of American Horror Stories.)
- Kathy Bates as Delphine LaLaurie
- Jessica Lange as Fiona Goode

=== Special guest stars ===
- Angela Bassett as Marie Laveau
- Gabourey Sidibe as Queenie
- Danny Huston as the Axeman of New Orleans
- Stevie Nicks as herself
- Patti LuPone as Joan Ramsey

=== Recurring ===
- Jamie Brewer as Nan
- Josh Hamilton as Hank Foxx
- Alexander Dreymon as Luke Ramsey
- Riley Voelkel as young Fiona Goode
- Michelle Page as young Myrtle Snow
- Leslie Jordan as Quentin Fleming
- Robin Bartlett as Cecily Pembroke
- Lance Reddick as Papa Legba
- Mare Winningham as Alicia Spencer
- Michael Cristofer as Harrison Renard
- Mike Colter as David Ames

=== Guest ===
- Grey Damon as Archie Brener
- Ian Anthony Dale as Dr. David Zhong
- Christine Ebersole as Anna-Lee Leighton
- Alexandra Breckenridge as Kaylee Rowe
- Lance E. Nichols as Detective Sanchez
- Grace Gummer as Millie Bishop

== Episodes ==
No. overall	No. in season	Title	Directed by	Written by	Original release date	Prod. code	US viewers (millions)
26	1	"Bitchcraft"	Alfonso Gomez-Rejon	Ryan Murphy & Brad Falchuk	October 9, 2013	3ATS01	5.54
Teenager Zoe Benson discovers she is a witch after accidentally giving her boyfriend a fatal brain aneurysm during sex. She is sent to Miss Robichaux's Academy, a school for witches in New Orleans, where she meets headmistress Cordelia Foxx and fellow students Madison Montgomery, a spoiled teenage actress who can move objects with her mind, Nan, a clairvoyant, and Queenie, a human voodoo doll. After young witch Misty Day is burned at the stake, Fiona Goode, the current Supreme and Cordelia's estranged mother, arrives to ensure their safety. At a fraternity party, Zoe bonds with Kyle Spencer, while Madison is drugged and gang-raped by Kyle's fraternity brothers, including Brener. The boys flee on a bus, which Madison telekinetically overturns. Fiona takes the girls on a field trip and tells them about the history of witches in New Orleans. Nan leads them to a tour of the mansion of Madame Delphine LaLaurie, who in 1834 tortured slave Bastien for having sex with her daughter, leading voodoo priestess and Bastien's lover Marie Laveau to poison Delphine. At a hospital, Zoe learns that Kyle died and rapes an unconscious Brener, killing him. Fiona has a still-living Delphine dug up.
27	2	"Boy Parts"	Michael Rymer	Tim Minear	October 16, 2013	3ATS02	4.51
Still seeking to be perpetually young and beautiful, Fiona questions her new captive, Delphine, who tells her that 180 years earlier, Marie gave her an immortality elixir, killed her family, and buried her alive. In hopes of becoming immortal as well, Fiona visits the still-living Marie in a 9th Ward hair salon and creates a renewed rivalry between the Salem witches and the voodoo practitioners. Zoe and Madison decide to cast a resurrection spell in order to bring Kyle, one of several fraternity members that Madison murdered, back to life. When Kyle reanimates as a scared, angry monster, Zoe must seek help from the reclusive Misty, who is a necromancer. Cordelia and her husband Hank have trouble conceiving a child, so he convinces her to perform a fertility ritual, to which they proceed.
28	3	"The Replacements"	Alfonso Gomez-Rejon	James Wong	October 23, 2013	3ATS03	3.78
In 1971, a young Fiona kills the current Supreme, Anna-Leigh Leighton, by slitting her throat. In 2013, Madison and Nan take a liking to the new next-door neighbor, Luke Ramsey, but clash with his overly religious mother Joan. After an encounter with the Ramseys, Madison manifests a previously unknown pyrokinesis. Zoe returns Kyle to his mother, Alicia, unaware that she abuses him sexually. When Alicia tries to molest Kyle again, he bludgeons her to death with a trophy. Cordelia discovers she can never get pregnant and begs Marie to perform a voodoo fertility ritual on her, but Marie refuses to help the daughter of her sworn enemy. Fiona turns Delphine into the maid of the academy. When Bastien appears outside the academy in his Minotaur form, Queenie offers herself to him before he grabs her by the mouth. Fiona is informed that she has terminal cancer and, after learning of Madison's growing power, declares she is the next Supreme. Fiona begs Madison to kill her but ends up cutting Madison's throat, killing her.
29	4	"Fearful Pranks Ensue"	Michael Uppendahl	Jennifer Salt	October 30, 2013	3ATS04	3.71
In 1971, butler Spalding cuts out his own tongue to protect Fiona after Myrtle Snow enchants his tongue to compel him to tell the truth about Anna-Leigh's death. In 2013, Fiona resurrects a badly injured Queenie. After receiving a package from Fiona containing the still-alive Minotaur's severed head, Marie performs a ritual to summon an army of zombies, ending the truce between the witches and voodoo practitioners. At Kyle's house, Zoe realizes that he has fled. While in Baton Rouge on a "business" trip, Hank has an affair with a woman named Kaylee before murdering her in his hotel room. The Witches' Council, headed by Myrtle, arrives at the academy to investigate Madison's disappearance. When Myrtle accuses Fiona of killing Anna-Leigh and Madison, Cordelia reveals that Madison had a heart murmur that prevented her from becoming the Supreme. In a bar restroom, a cloaked figure throws acid on Cordelia's face. On Halloween night, a horde of zombies—including Delphine's three daughters—surrounds the academy.
30	5	"Burn, Witch. Burn!"	Jeremy Podeswa	Jessica Sharzer	November 6, 2013	3ATS05	3.80
The students at the academy fight off Marie's army of zombies, whereupon Zoe unleashes a new power that breaks Marie's spell. Delphine is forced to kill her zombified eldest daughter when she corners Queenie. Cordelia, left blind as a result of the acid attack, has a vision of Hank's infidelity when he visits her at the hospital and touches her hand, having developed the power of second sight. The Council returns and demands that Fiona abdicate her Supremacy, noting that the coven has been under attack since her arrival. Fiona refuses and accuses Myrtle of the attack on Cordelia due to her grudge against Fiona, showing acid burns on Myrtle's hand as proof. The other Council members, Cecily and Quentin, sentence Myrtle to burn at the stake. It is revealed that Queenie helped Fiona frame Myrtle by dipping her own hand in sulfuric acid. Misty finds Myrtle's charred corpse and resurrects her.
31	6	"The Axeman Cometh"	Michael Uppendahl	Douglas Petrie	November 13, 2013	3ATS06	4.16
Zoe, Queenie, and Nan use a spirit board in order to find Madison. The girls end up contacting legendary serial killer, the Axeman, whose spirit has been confined to the academy since he was killed by a coven of witches in 1919. Despite warnings from Queenie, Zoe uses the spirit board alone to ask the Axeman where Madison is, promising him release. After Zoe finds Madison's rotting corpse in the attic, the girls interrogate and torture Spalding, who falsely confesses to killing Madison. A now blind Cordelia angrily throws Hank out after she has another vision of his infidelity. It is revealed that Hank is secretly a witch hunter, hired six years before by Marie to kill every Salem descendant. Misty resurrects Madison at Zoe's request, while Kyle is chained to a wall at the academy. The Axeman's spirit terrorizes Cordelia, demanding release. Zoe, Queenie, and Nan rescue Cordelia by reciting an incantation which, unbeknownst to them, allows the Axeman to leave the academy. He finds Fiona in a bar and offers to buy her a drink.
32	7	"The Dead"	Bradley Buecker	Brad Falchuk	November 20, 2013	3ATS07	4.00
As they grow closer, Delphine tells Queenie that the other witches will never truly accept her because she is Black. Queenie visits Marie, who offers to let Queenie join the voodoo practitioners if she brings her Delphine. After seeing a vision of Fiona killing Madison, Cordelia conspires to kill Fiona. While dealing with the side effects of her chemotherapy, Fiona has a one-night stand with the Axeman, who reveals that he has been watching her since she was a child. Fiona rebuffs the Axeman's advances, but later meets him at a jazz bar. Zoe casts a spell to reattach Spalding's tongue and interrogates him, killing him after he admits Fiona was Madison's real murderer. After Zoe walks in on Kyle and Madison having sex, Madison proposes that she and Zoe share him, leading to a threesome. Delphine confesses to Queenie that she once murdered a baby her husband fathered with a Black servant and used its blood as a beauty elixir. Disgusted, Queenie turns Delphine over to Marie.
33	8	"The Sacred Taking"	Alfonso Gomez-Rejon	Ryan Murphy	December 4, 2013	3ATS08	4.07
Misty and a resurrected Myrtle arrive at the academy to escape a witch hunter, and Myrtle declares that Misty is the next Supreme due to her resurrection abilities. The coven prepares for the Sacred Taking ritual, in which a Supreme witch takes her own life to ensure the safety of the coven, hastening the ascension of the next Supreme. As Fiona's health deteriorates, Madison and Myrtle appear separately to her, taunting her with threats that she will be burned at the stake for killing Madison unless she swallows a handful of pills. Fiona takes the pills but vomits them after Spalding's ghost informs her of the coven's plot against her. At Marie's, Delphine is being held in a cage and scoffs at Marie's taunts. Marie hacks off Delphine's hand as a warning. That evening, an attack is carried out when an unseen witch hunter shoots and kills Joan and injures Luke. Misty revives Joan at Fiona's request. The next morning, Fiona finds Delphine's severed head in a box on the porch.
34	9	"Head"	Howard Deutch	Tim Minear	December 11, 2013	3ATS09	3.94
Marie scoffs at Fiona's offer of an alliance. Hank, who was trained to be a witch hunter since childhood and married Cordelia to infiltrate the coven, travels to Atlanta to meet with his father Harrison Renard, the CEO of the Delphi Trust, an asset management company used as a front for a witch-hunting organization. It is revealed that the organization was responsible for the acid attack on Cordelia. Myrtle exacts revenge on Cecily and Quentin by killing them and extracting their eyes, which she uses to restore Cordelia's eyesight, though Cordelia loses her power of second sight. Nan bonds with Joan by using her clairvoyance to read the comatose Luke's mind, but when Luke reveals through Nan that Joan murdered his unfaithful father, Joan smothers Luke with a pillow. After Cordelia announces her plans to file for divorce, Hank raids Marie's salon, gunning down several voodoo witches and injuring Marie before Queenie shoots herself through the mouth, killing Hank. Marie seeks refuge at the academy.
35	10	"The Magical Delights of Stevie Nicks"	Alfonso Gomez-Rejon	James Wong	January 8, 2014	3ATS10	3.49
Marie and Fiona form an alliance to protect themselves from the witch hunters. Marie is visited by an ancient spiritual entity, Papa Legba, to whom she sold her soul centuries earlier in order to acquire immortality; in exchange, Marie must provide an innocent soul for him once a year. Misty is thrilled when Fiona introduces her to her idol, Stevie Nicks, who gifts Misty her trademark shawl and wishes her luck with the Seven Wonders trial. Madison tries to sabotage Misty in the race for the Supremacy by knocking her unconscious and burying her alive in a cemetery. When Fiona casts a spell that ruins the Delphi Trust financially, Harrison suspects the witches and plans a retaliation. Nan, who has developed mind control powers, compels Joan to kill herself by drinking bleach as punishment for murdering Luke. After Nan finds the newborn Marie stole for Papa Legba, Fiona and Marie drown Nan in the bathtub and offer her as a sacrifice to Papa Legba, who reluctantly accepts the substitution.
36	11	"Protect the Coven"	Bradley Buecker	Jennifer Salt	January 15, 2014	3ATS11	3.46
The witches hold a funeral for Nan, where Queenie arrives with a newly reassembled Delphine. Madison refuses to accept that Kyle is in love with Zoe, using her telekinesis to hit Zoe with a lamp. Cordelia pierces her eyeballs with pruning shears in order to regain the second sight. Fiona and Marie hold a meeting with the witch hunters of the Delphi Trust, but when the men refuse Fiona's demand for the dissolution of the witch hunters, the Axeman kills all the men except Harrison, who is killed by Fiona. Spalding's ghost persuades Delphine to kill Marie, believing that Fiona's alliance with Marie poses a threat to the coven. After Spalding claims that Benadryl will render Marie mortal, Delphine serves Marie a Benadryl-laced French 75 before stabbing her in the chest, only to find that she is still immortal. Spalding knocks Marie unconscious and suggests that Delphine bury her in a way that she cannot dig herself out. At Myrtle's urging, Zoe and Kyle escape the coven and board a bus to Orlando, Florida.
37	12	"Go to Hell"	Alfonso Gomez-Rejon	Jessica Sharzer	January 22, 2014	3ATS12	3.35
Queenie summons Papa Legba, who strips both Marie and Delphine of their immortality because Marie can no longer fulfill her contract, as Delphine dismembered her. After Queenie kills Delphine, Papa Legba sentences Marie to torture Delphine for all eternity in a shared hell for their respective crimes. Fiona, who is dying of cancer, attempts to make amends by saying goodbye to Cordelia, giving her a family heirloom. When Fiona touches her, Cordelia has a vision of the future in which the entire coven—including herself—has been killed by Fiona in order to retain her Supremacy. Cordelia warns the Axeman of Fiona's plans to leave him. Zoe returns to the academy with Kyle, claiming to be the next Supreme after manifesting a new power. Cordelia and Queenie rescue Misty, who beats up Madison in retaliation for entombing her. The Axeman attempts to attack the witches at the academy. After Cordelia sees in a vision that the Axeman murdered Fiona in a fit of rage, Zoe, Madison, Queenie, and Misty stab him to death.
38	13	"The Seven Wonders"	Alfonso Gomez-Rejon	Douglas Petrie	January 29, 2014	3ATS13	4.24
Zoe, Madison, Queenie, and Misty undergo the test of the Seven Wonders. The one who performs them all successfully is the next Supreme. At first, the girls pass each test, until they reach descensum, where they must send their spirits to hell and return before sunrise. All pass except Misty, whose spirit remains trapped in her own personal hell. Next is the act of transmutation. Zoe impales herself on the iron gates of the academy, resulting in her death. Queenie fails at resurrection, while Madison refuses to bring Zoe back to life. Myrtle convinces Cordelia to attempt the Seven Wonders, and she completes them all successfully while Madison fails at divination. Cordelia resurrects Zoe and is crowned the new Supreme. Myrtle later requests to again be burned at the stake for her dishonorable actions of murder and a fresh start for Cordelia. Kyle kills Madison for refusing to resurrect Zoe, and Spalding takes her body. As the new Supreme, Cordelia decides to go public with the presence of the coven. Myrtle insists on being burned at the stake for harming the council. Hundreds of girls are shown outside the gates as Cordelia appoints Queenie and Zoe to members of the Council and makes peace with her dying mother after inheriting her powers and title of Supreme, marking a new beginning in the history of the coven.

== Production ==
=== Conception ===
In January 2013, series co-creator Ryan Murphy hinted that a clue about the third season would be hidden in the tenth episode of the second season. In a later interview discussing that episode, he stated, "I sorta feel like for the third version I want to do something that's a little bit more 'evil glamour.' Just something that's a little bit more...one of the things that I missed this season was I really loved having that Romeo and Juliet youth story with Violet and Tate [from the first season]. I want something like that again, and we're doing something like that in the third season. And we're contemplating shooting the show in a different place. We're contemplating shooting it in a place in the country where true horror has been." In another interview, Murphy added that the season would be set in the modern-day.

Executive producer Tim Minear has stated that, while this season's tone might be lighter with more humor, the global themes of it will be "oppression of minorities of all kinds, and within that idea, minority groups going after each other and doing the work of the larger culture." He added, "While there is a strong feminist theme that runs throughout Coven, there are themes of race and themes of oppression, and themes of family – especially mothers and daughters."

=== Future season ===
In October 2016, Murphy stated that a future season of the show would feature a return/continuation of Coven. He stated that this is not the theme for season 7, but a later season. He also confirmed that Lady Gaga's character from Roanoke is the first Supreme. Later that month, Murphy announced that the season would be a Coven and Murder House crossover continuation. Merging stories, themes, and characters. He also stated that he had begun reaching out to actors from both seasons to reprise their respective roles. In 2018, Murphy announced the eighth season, Apocalypse, which would be the crossover season. Apocalypse follows the world after a nuclear holocaust, and the events leading up to the end of the world, principally, the witches' fight against Michael Langdon, the antichrist who was born in Murder House.

=== Casting ===
Series executive producers and co-creators Ryan Murphy and Brad Falchuk stated that, as with the second season, "many actors" would return for the third season in different roles. Jessica Lange, Evan Peters, and Sarah Paulson all confirmed their returns. Murphy added that Lange would portray a "real glamour-cat lady", whose name was later revealed to be Fiona Goode. Paulson said in an interview that her character would "definitely [be] different [to her season two character]." She added, "Basically, she's going to look different, and my relationship to Lange is going to be quite different this time. At the beginning of last season, no one knew that Lana would be the hero, so it's possible I could end up the evil one this year. As of right now, there will be some of Lana Winters' qualities in my character, but I don't know for sure." Taissa Farmiga, who played a lead role in the first season, starred as Zoe Benson, a character involved in a prominent romance with Peters' character. Lily Rabe and Frances Conroy portrayed series regulars Misty Day and Myrtle Snow, respectively. Kathy Bates co-starred as Delphine LaLaurie, an evil woman from the past who tortures her slaves. Murphy stated that Bates' character would be "five times worse than [her] Misery character" and is also inspired by a "true event". It was reported on May 22, 2013, that Emma Roberts would co-star as Madison Montgomery, a difficult Hollywood starlet.

In May 2013, Murphy announced via Twitter that Angela Bassett and Patti LuPone had joined the cast. Bassett later confirmed she would be playing voodoo priestess, Marie Laveau. In an interview, LuPone said that her character, Joan Ramsey, would not be a witch but "the personification of the religious right, 'like Piper Laurie in Carrie.'" Gabourey Sidibe appeared in 12 episodes of the season portraying Queenie, a young witch, whose prominent ability allows her to become a human voodoo doll. First season actress Jamie Brewer recurred as Nan, a young witch who is clairvoyant.

In July and August 2013, Murphy announced through Twitter that Murder House actors Denis O'Hare and Alexandra Breckenridge had joined the cast in unknown roles, later known as Spalding and Kaylee, respectively. Also in August, Murphy announced that Christine Ebersole would be playing a "Glinda the Good Witch-type of gal", who is Fiona's predecessor. In an interview, Jessica Lange revealed that Mare Winningham had joined the cast as Peters' character's mother, Alicia Spencer. Leslie Jordan announced that he had joined the cast as Quentin Fleming, a high-ranking witch. In September 2013, Alexander Dreymon was cast in the role of Luke Ramsey. Described as "the handsome young man who moves in next door to the Academy". Danny Huston, Josh Hamilton, and Lance Reddick all recurred throughout the season as the Axeman, Hank Foxx, and Papa Legba, respectively. Murphy also invited singer Stevie Nicks to be a part of the season. She appeared in two episodes, "The Magical Delights of Stevie Nicks" and "The Seven Wonders".

=== Filming ===
Principal photography for the season began on July 23, 2013, and concluded January 17, 2014, in New Orleans, Louisiana. The casting call reads, "After two seasons shooting in Los Angeles, the series moves to [New Orleans] for its third season. Filming begins July 23, 2013, in New Orleans, Louisiana and [will be] completed on January 17, 2014." Despite Ryan Murphy stating that the third season would take place in multiple cities, New Orleans is the primary setting of the third installment. The Buckner Mansion, a 19th-century Greek Revival home in the Garden District neighborhood of New Orleans, was used for exterior shots of Miss Robichaux's Academy.

== Release ==
=== Marketing ===
Similar to the prior seasons, FX published mini teaser trailers for Coven on the show's Facebook page.

=== Home media ===
American Horror Story: Coven – The Complete Third Season
Set Details		Special Features
13 Episodes; 4 Disc Set (DVD); 3 Disc Set (BD); English & Spanish 5.1 Dolby Digital; Subtitles: English SDH, Spanish, French; Runtime: 594 Minutes		Zombie Halloween: A Look at the Making of the Episode "Fearful Pranks Ensue"; Enter the Coven: A Look at the Entire Season with Interviews From the Cast and Crew; Meet Mrs. NOLA: Shooting on Location in New Orleans
Release Dates
Region 1	Region 2	Region 4
October 7, 2014	October 20, 2014	October 7, 2014

== Reception ==
=== Critical response ===
American Horror Story: Coven received positive reviews from critics. The review aggregation website Rotten Tomatoes reported an 85% approval rating, with an average rating of 7.25/10, based on 221 reviews, becoming the best-reviewed season of the series on that site. The site's consensus reads, "A noteworthy ensemble cast combined with creepy storytelling and campy, outrageous thrills make American Horror Story: Coven a potently structured fright-fest." The season scored 71 out of 100 on Metacritic, based on 24 reviews.

Anne T Donahue of The Guardian stated that Coven "could be American Horror Story's best instalment yet," writing, "That's not to say Coven is perfect. It's been called out as glorified slave-torture porn in the US, and it's important that Madame LeLaurie's storyline comes full circle, and that slavery is handled in a responsible way. The same goes for Zoe's storyline, and the incidences of sexual assault within this season, too. But American Horror Story can handle it. And while it's obviously over-the-top, its broader social commentary makes it a unique series, unlike anything we've seen on television before. It's a conventional horror story, but it's America's horror story too. Just try making it through an episode without hiding behind the sofa." In their post-season reviews, The Michigan Daily gave Coven a B+, saying, "And while its conclusion, appropriately titled "The Seven Wonders", never quite matched the high standard it set for itself throughout the season, Coven's reputation will nonetheless remain a solid one." Jeff Jensen of Entertainment Weekly gave the season a B rating and said, "I can't deny my experience: Week to week, the excesses of Coven were wickedly amusing. Next year, I hope American Horror Story can be more than that, and with less."

In contrast, Coven was also met with negative reviews from some critics. The A.V. Club gave the season a low rating of D+, with critic Emily St. James remarking, "It lurched drunkenly from idea to idea, never settling on one long enough to build anything of worth." Some critics, like Amanda Kay LeBlanc, state that the series is ineffective in completely opposing the ideas of racism, oppression, and racial conflict that are integral to Coven's conception. "Although the narrative of Coven explicitly decries racism," she writes, "it simultaneously invests in colorblind racist narratives. Whiteness is central in Coven, operating through discourse that ignores racial difference and contemporary forms of oppression and erasure." She additionally argues that Coven excessively depends on and uses the imagery of violence against black people for entertainment and plot progression.

American Horror Story season 3: Critical reception by episode
Season 3 (2013–14): Percentage of positive critics' reviews tracked by the website Rotten Tomatoes

=== Ratings ===
Coven's premiere episode, "Bitchcraft", was watched by 5.54 million viewers, which, at the time, was the highest total viewers of any American Horror Story episode. It was surpassed by the fourth season's premiere, "Monsters Among Us", which received 6.13 million viewers during its broadcast. The ratings slipped for the second episode, delivering 4.51 million viewers and a 2.5 rating among adults 18-49 – down 17% from the premiere. The rest of the season's episodes remained relatively steady in ratings; the episode with the lowest viewing numbers was the penultimate episode, "Go to Hell".

Nielsen Media Research, which records streaming viewership on certain U.S. television screens, reported that American Horror Story: Coven garnered 1.18 billion minutes of watch time, averaging 90.9 million minutes viewed per episode, between May 1, 2024, and August 31, 2026.

== Accolades ==
In its third season, the series was nominated for 74 awards, 14 of which were won.

Year	Association	Category	Nominee(s)	Result
2013	IGN's Best of 2013: TV	Best TV Horror Series	American Horror Story: Coven	Nominated
2014	4th Critics' Choice TV Awards	Best Movie/ Miniseries	American Horror Story: Coven	Nominated
2014	4th Critics' Choice TV Awards	Best Supporting Actress in a Movie/ Miniseries	Kathy Bates	Nominated
2014	4th Critics' Choice TV Awards	Best Actress in a Movie/Miniseries	Jessica Lange	Won
2014	5th Dorian Awards	TV Performance of the Year – Actress	Jessica Lange	Won
2014	5th Dorian Awards	TV Drama of the Year	American Horror Story: Coven	Nominated
2014	5th Dorian Awards	Campy TV Show of the Year	American Horror Story: Coven	Won
2014	66th Primetime Emmy Awards	Outstanding Limited/Anthology Series	American Horror Story: Coven	Nominated
2014	66th Primetime Emmy Awards	Outstanding Writing for a Limited/Anthology orMovie	Ryan Murphy & Brad Falchuk (for "Bitchcraft")	Nominated
2014	66th Primetime Emmy Awards	Outstanding Directing for a Limited/Anthology or Movie	Alfonso Gomez-Rejon (for "Bitchcraft")	Nominated
2014	66th Primetime Emmy Awards	Outstanding Supporting Actress in a Limited/Anthology Series or Movie	Kathy Bates	Won
2014	66th Primetime Emmy Awards	Outstanding Supporting Actress in a Limited/Anthology Series or Movie	Frances Conroy	Nominated
2014	66th Primetime Emmy Awards	Outstanding Supporting Actress in a Limited/Anthology Series or Movie	Angela Bassett	Nominated
2014	66th Primetime Emmy Awards	Outstanding Lead Actress in a Limited/Anthology or Movie	Sarah Paulson	Nominated
2014	66th Primetime Emmy Awards	Outstanding Lead Actress in a Limited/Anthology or Movie	Jessica Lange	Won
2014	66th Primetime Creative Arts Emmy Awards	Outstanding Casting for a Limited/Anthology or Movie	Robert J. Ulrich, Eric Dawson, Meagan Lewis	Nominated
2014	66th Primetime Creative Arts Emmy Awards	Outstanding Costumes for a Miniseries, Movie or Special	Lou Eyrich, Elizabeth Macey, Ken Van Duyne (for "Bitchcraft")	Won
2014	66th Primetime Creative Arts Emmy Awards	Outstanding Hairstyling for a Limited Series or Movie	Monte C. Haught, Michelle Ceglia, Yolanda Mercadel, Daina Daigle	Won
2014	66th Primetime Creative Arts Emmy Awards	Outstanding Makeup	Eryn Krueger Mekash, Kim Ayers, Vicki Vacca, Mike Mekash, Christopher Nelson, Lucy O'Reilly	Nominated
2014	66th Primetime Creative Arts Emmy Awards	Outstanding Music Composition for a Miniseries, Movie, or a Special	James S. Levine (for "The Seven Wonders")	Nominated
2014	66th Primetime Creative Arts Emmy Awards	Outstanding Prosthetic Makeup	Eryn Krueger Mekash, Mike Mekash, Christien Tinsley, Jason Hamer, Christopher Nelson, David L. Anderson, Cristina Patterson, Rob Freitas	Nominated
2014	66th Primetime Creative Arts Emmy Awards	Outstanding Sound Editing for a Miniseries, Movie or Special	Gary Megregian, David Klotz, Timothy A. Cleveland, Paul Diller, Brian Thomas Nist, Steve M. Stuhr, Lance Wiseman, Noel Vought (for "Fearful Pranks Ensue")	Nominated
2014	66th Primetime Creative Arts Emmy Awards	Outstanding Sound Mixing for a Miniseries or Movie	Bruce Litecky, Joe Earle, Doug Andham (for "Fearful Pranks Ensue")	Nominated
2014	66th Primetime Creative Arts Emmy Awards	Outstanding Art Direction for a Miniseries or Movie	Mark Worthington, Andrew Murdock, Ellen Brill	Nominated
2014	71st Golden Globe Awards	Best Actress – Miniseries or TV Film	Jessica Lange	Nominated
2014	71st Golden Globe Awards	Best Limited/ Anthology or TV Film	American Horror Story: Coven	Nominated
2014	61st MPSE Golden Reel Awards	Best Sound Editing in TV – Short Form: Dialogue & ADR	Episode: "Bitchcraft"	Nominated
2014	45th NAACP Image Awards	Outstanding Actress in a TV Movie, Mini-Series or Dramatic Special	Gabourey Sidibe	Nominated
2014	45th NAACP Image Awards	Outstanding Actress in a TV Movie, Mini-Series or Dramatic Special	Angela Bassett	Nominated
2014	18th Online Film & TV Association Awards	Best Supporting Actress in a Motion Picture or Miniseries	Angela Bassett	Nominated
2014	18th Online Film & TV Association Awards	Best Supporting Actress in a Motion Picture or Miniseries	Kathy Bates	Won
2014	18th Online Film & TV Association Awards	Best Supporting Actress in a Motion Picture or Miniseries	Frances Conroy	Nominated
2014	18th Online Film & TV Association Awards	Best Supporting Actress in a Motion Picture or Miniseries	Lily Rabe	Nominated
2014	18th Online Film & TV Association Awards	Best Supporting Actress in a Motion Picture or Miniseries	Gabourey Sidibe	Nominated
2014	18th Online Film & TV Association Awards	Best Actress in a Motion Picture or Miniseries	Jessica Lange	Nominated
2014	18th Online Film & TV Association Awards	Best Actress in a Motion Picture or Miniseries	Sarah Paulson	Nominated
2014	18th Online Film & TV Association Awards	Best Miniseries	American Horror Story: Coven	Nominated
2014	18th Online Film & TV Association Awards	Best Ensemble in a Motion Picture or Miniseries	American Horror Story: Coven	Nominated
2014	18th Online Film & TV Association Awards	Best Direction of a Motion Picture or Miniseries	American Horror Story: Coven	Nominated
2014	18th Online Film & TV Association Awards	Best Music in a Non-Series	American Horror Story: Coven	Nominated
2014	18th Online Film & TV Association Awards	Best Editing in a Non-Series	American Horror Story: Coven	Nominated
2014	18th Online Film & TV Association Awards	Best Cinematography in a Non-Series	American Horror Story: Coven	Nominated
2014	18th Online Film & TV Association Awards	Best Production Design in a Non-Series	American Horror Story: Coven	Nominated
2014	18th Online Film & TV Association Awards	Best Costume Design in a Non-Series	American Horror Story: Coven	Won
2014	18th Online Film & TV Association Awards	Best Makeup/Hairstyling in a Non-Series	American Horror Story: Coven	Won
2014	18th Online Film & TV Association Awards	Best Sound in a Non-Series	American Horror Story: Coven	Nominated
2014	18th Online Film & TV Association Awards	Best Visual Effects in a Non-Series	American Horror Story: Coven	Won
2014	18th Online Film & TV Association Awards	Best New Titles Sequence	American Horror Story: Coven	Nominated
2014	40th People's Choice Awards	Favorite TV Movie/Miniseries	American Horror Story: Coven	Won
2014	18th Satellite Awards	Best TV Series – Genre	American Horror Story: Coven	Nominated
2014	18th Satellite Awards	Best Actress – Miniseries or TV Film	Jessica Lange	Nominated
2014	18th Satellite Awards	Best Supporting Actress – Series, Miniseries or TV Film	Kathy Bates	Nominated
2014	40th Saturn Awards	Best Supporting Actress on TV	Kathy Bates	Nominated
2014	40th Saturn Awards	Best Guest Starring Role on TV	Danny Huston	Nominated
2014	40th Saturn Awards	Best Syndicated/Cable TV Series	American Horror Story: Coven	Nominated
2014	40th Saturn Awards	Best Actress on TV	Jessica Lange	Nominated
2014	20th Screen Actors Guild Awards	Outstanding Performance by a Female Actor in a Drama Series	Jessica Lange	Nominated
2014	30th TCA Awards	Outstanding Achievement in Movies, Miniseries and Specials	American Horror Story: Coven	Nominated
2014	54th Golden Nymph Awards	Best Actress in a Miniseries	Jessica Lange	Nominated
2014	54th Golden Nymph Awards	Best Actress in a Miniseries	Sarah Paulson	Nominated
2014	18th ADG Excellence in Production Design Awards	TV movie or Miniseries	Mark Worthington (for "Bitchcraft")	Nominated
2014	35th Young Artist Awards	Best Performance in a TV Series – Guest Starring Young Actor 11–13	Toby Nichols	Nominated
2014	BET Awards 2014	Best Actress	Angela Bassett	Nominated
2014	50th CAS Awards	Outstanding Achievement in Sound Mixing – TV Movie or Miniseries	Bruce Litecky, CAS (Production Mixer); Joe Earle, CAS (Re-recording Mixer); Doug Andham, CAS (Re-recording Mixer); James S. Levine (Scoring Mixer); Judah Getz (ADR Mixer); Kyle Billingsley (Foley Mixer) (for "The Replacements")	Nominated
2014	16th CDG Awards	Outstanding Made for Television Movie or Miniseries	Lou Eyrich	Nominated
2014	Make-up Artists & Hair Stylists Guild Awards 2014	Miniseries or TV Movie Period and/or Character Make-up	Eryn Krueger Mekash, Christien Tinsley	Nominated
2014	Make-up Artists & Hair Stylists Guild Awards 2014	Miniseries or TV Movie Period and/or Character Hair Styling	Monte C. Haught	Nominated
2014	51st ICG Publicists Awards	Maxwell Weinberg Campaign Award – TV	Matthew Mitchell	Won
2014	TV Guide Awards 2012	Favorite Horror Show	American Horror Story: Coven	Nominated
2014	Women's Image Network Awards 2014	MFT Movie/Miniseries	American Horror Story: Coven	Won
2014	Women's Image Network Awards 2014	Actress MFT Movie/Miniseries	Emma Roberts (for "The Dead")	Nominated
2015	26th PGA Awards	Outstanding Producer of Long-Form TV	Brad Buecker, Dante Di Loreto, Brad Falchuk, Joseph Incaprera, Alexis Martin Woodall, Tim Minear, Ryan Murphy, Jennifer Salt, James Wong (also for Freak Show)	Nominated
2015	30th Artios Awards	TV movie or Miniseries	Robert J. Ulrich, Eric Dawson, Carol Kritzer, Meagan Lewis (Location Casting), Eric Souliere (Associate)	Nominated
2015	Bram Stoker Award 2014	Superior Achievement in a Screenplay	James Wong (for "The Magical Delights of Stevie Nicks")	Nominated
