= The Axeman Cometh =

The Axeman Cometh may refer to:

- "The Axeman Cometh" (American Horror Story), a 2013 episode of American Horror Story: Coven
- "The Axeman Cometh", a 1986 episode of Lovejoy
- "The Axeman Cometh", a 1994 episode of Mighty Max
- "The Axeman Cometh", a 2007 episode of Midsomer Murders
