= Go to Hell (American Horror Story) =

- American Horror Story episode
- Episode no.: Season 3 Episode 12
- Directed by: Alfonso Gomez-Rejon
- Written by: Jessica Sharzer
- Production code: 3ATS12
- Original air date: January 22, 2014
- Running time: 45 minutes

Guest appearances
- Angela Bassett as Marie Laveau; Danny Huston as The Axeman; Gabourey Sidibe as Queenie; Lance Reddick as Papa Legba

Episode chronology
| ← Previous "Protect the Coven" | Next → "The Seven Wonders" |
- American Horror Story: Coven

"Go to Hell" is the twelfth and penultimate episode of the third season of the anthology television series American Horror Story, which premiered on January 22, 2014, on the cable network FX. The episode was written by Jessica Sharzer and directed by Alfonso Gomez-Rejon.

With Fiona (Jessica Lange)'s deteriorating health, the girls show new powers as Queenie (Gabourey Sidibe) searches for Marie Laveau (Angela Bassett). Angela Bassett, Gabourey Sidibe, and Danny Huston guest star as Marie Laveau, Queenie, and the Axeman, respectively. This episode is rated TV-MA (LV).

== Plot ==
Fiona tries to persuade Queenie to take a chance at the test of the Seven Wonders, seven advanced feats of magic a witch must master to ascend as the Supreme: telekinesis, concilium, transmutation, divination, vitalum vitalis, descensum, and pyrokinesis. Due to the trials being potentially lethal, Queenie accuses Fiona of wanting to kill her successor, but Fiona insists she is just tired.

A blind Cordelia is searching for Misty and seeks Madison's help by touching her. In an attempt to evade Cordelia, Madison develops the power of transmutation and teleports to another corner of the room. Cordelia gets Madison to let her touch her, but sees nothing. Cordelia eventually tracks down the entombed Misty and together with Queenie, they rescue her.

Searching for Marie, Queenie successfully projects herself through descensum and summons Papa Legba. After Queenie points out that Marie can no longer fulfill her deal with Papa Legba, as Delphine dismembered Marie and scattered her body parts across New Orleans, Papa Legba strips both Marie and Delphine of their immortality. Queenie finds Delphine posing as a tour guide in her former house, now a museum, and kills her after failing to turn her towards goodness. For their respective crimes in life, Delphine is sentenced to being tortured by Marie in her own torture chamber for all eternity in a shared hell.

Fiona, who is dying of cancer, attempts to make amends with Cordelia, giving her a family heirloom as a goodbye. When Fiona touches her, Cordelia has a vision of the future in which the entire coven—including herself—has been killed by Fiona as she maintains her position as Supreme. Cordelia visits the Axeman and alerts him of Fiona's plans to leave him and flee the country.

At Miss Robichaux's, Zoe returns with Kyle from Florida, claiming to be the next Supreme after manifesting the power of vitalum vitalis. Misty bursts in and beats up Madison in retaliation for entombing her. Suddenly, the Axeman lunges at the witches, who throw him into the staircase. After Cordelia sees in a vision that the Axeman murdered Fiona in a fit of rage, Zoe, Madison, Queenie, and Misty stab him to death. Cordelia announces that the young witches will all participate in the Seven Wonders to determine the new Supreme.

== Reception ==
Rotten Tomatoes reports a 62% approval rating, based on 13 reviews. The critical consensus reads, ""Go to Hell" presents a microcosm of Coven's flaws with a crowded episode whose messy narrative crowds out an effective surprise for a leading character." Matt Fowler from IGN gave the episode a rating of 7.9, adding that, ""Go to Hell" was a more focused episode, with a lot of driving action. It sounded off a few sour notes here and there, but in the end parts of it felt like a season finale." Emily VanDerWerff of The A.V. Club rated the episode a D+, stating, ""Go to Hell" kills off Coven's older generation in its entirety, turning things over to the next generation, and I could not give two shits about it." He added, "By far the worst thing any TV show can be is boring, and that goes doubly for a Ryan Murphy and Brad Falchuk show. But in "Go to Hell", even the outrageous stuff feels rote."

The episode received a 1.8 18–49 ratings share and was watched by 3.36 million viewers in its original American broadcast, a decrease from the previous episode.
