= Protect the Coven =

- American Horror Story episode
- Episode no.: Season 3 Episode 11
- Directed by: Bradley Buecker
- Written by: Jennifer Salt
- Production code: 3ATS11
- Original air date: January 15, 2014
- Running time: 47 minutes

Guest appearances
- Angela Bassett as Marie Laveau; Danny Huston as The Axeman; Gabourey Sidibe as Queenie; Michael Cristofer as Harrison Renard; Mike Colter as David Ames

Episode chronology
← Previous "The Magical Delights of Stevie Nicks"	Next → "Go to Hell"
- American Horror Story: Coven

"Protect the Coven" is the eleventh episode of the third season of the anthology television series American Horror Story, which premiered on January 15, 2014, on the cable network FX. The episode was written by Jennifer Salt and directed by Bradley Buecker.

In this episode, Fiona (Jessica Lange) and Marie Laveau (Angela Bassett) face off with The corporation while Cordelia (Sarah Paulson) makes a desperate sacrifice to protect the coven. Angela Bassett, Gabourey Sidibe, and Danny Huston guest star as Marie Laveau, Queenie and the Axeman, respectively. This episode is rated TV-MA (LV).

== Plot ==
The coven witches and Marie hold a funeral for Nan, with Fiona claiming that she fell in the bathtub. Queenie arrives with a leashed Delphine.

When a Black gardener walks into the academy with a wounded hand, Delphine takes him to the attic, where she tortures him to death while he is bound and gagged. Spalding's ghost appears to Delphine and persuades her to kill Marie, believing that Fiona's alliance with Marie poses a threat to the coven. Spalding lies to Delphine that dissolving a few tablets of Benadryl in Marie's drink will render her mortal.

Zoe performs a spell in front of a bathtub, which reveals that Fiona and Marie drowned Nan. Madison confronts Zoe about excluding her from their ménage à trois. When Kyle declares that he loves Zoe, Madison throws a tantrum, using her telekinesis to hit Zoe in the back of the head with a lamp before Myrtle intervenes.

The Axeman suggests that Fiona spend her final days with him in his family's farmhouse after killing the new Supreme. She agrees but asks him to do her one small favor.

Cordelia pierces each eye with a pair of pruning shears in order to regain the second sight. Myrtle urges Zoe to escape the coven with Kyle while she still can, giving her an expensive piece of jewelry to pawn for money.

Hank's father, Harrison Renard, and his associates arrive for a meeting with Fiona and Marie. The men agree to make reparations to Marie and a 100-year truce in exchange for an end to the magical siege. Fiona counters with a demand for the dissolution of the witch hunters, a house, and a private jet, but they refuse. The waiter reveals himself to be the Axeman, who kills all the men except Harrison. Fiona hacks Harrison's throat with the Axeman's axe.

After serving Marie a Benadryl-laced French 75, Delphine stabs her in the chest, only to find that she is still immortal. As Marie chases Delphine with a knife, Spalding hits Marie in the head with his doll, knocking her down the stairs. He suggests that Delphine bury Marie in a way that she cannot dig herself out.

Zoe and Kyle escape the coven and board a bus to Orlando, Florida.

== Reception ==
Rotten Tomatoes reports a 79% approval rating, based on 14 reviews. The critical consensus reads, ""Protect the Coven" satisfyingly sets the table for the season finale with a suitably gross installment whose extra plot point makes its hard-to-follow storyline even more confusing." Dennis Perkins of The A.V. Club rated the episode a B+, stating, "Broadcast television could stand to be a good measure weirder and more outrageous, especially when affording some of the country's greatest actresses (actresses 'of a certain age' no less) a chance to really go for it in prime time." Matt Fowler from IGN gave the episode a rating of 7.2/10, stating, ""Protect the Coven" already had its fair share of take-backs and fizzle-outs as it was, what with Delia re-blinding herself (which, I believe, is the first reversal of a reversal) and the disappointing end to the witch hunter story."

The episode received a 1.9 18–49 ratings share and was watched by 3.46 million viewers in its original American broadcast, a decrease from the previous episode.
