= The Dead (American Horror Story) =

- American Horror Story episode
- Episode no.: Season 3 Episode 7
- Directed by: Bradley Buecker
- Written by: Brad Falchuk
- Production code: 3ATS07
- Original air date: November 20, 2013
- Running time: 48 minutes

Guest appearances
- Angela Bassett as Marie Laveau; Danny Huston as The Axeman; Gabourey Sidibe as Queenie; Josh Hamilton as Hank Foxx; Riley Voelkel as Young Fiona Goode; Gavin Stenhouse as Billy; P. J. Boudousqué as Jimmy

Episode chronology
← Previous "The Axeman Cometh"	Next → "The Sacred Taking"
- American Horror Story: Coven

"The Dead" is the seventh episode of the third season of the anthology television series American Horror Story, which premiered on November 20, 2013, on the cable network FX. This episode is rated TV-MA (LSV).

In this episode, Queenie (Gabourey Sidibe) questions her place in the Coven; Fiona (Jessica Lange) takes advantage of a love affair with the Axeman (Danny Huston); and Cordelia (Sarah Paulson) makes a fateful decision about her mother. Angela Bassett, Gabourey Sidibe, and Danny Huston guest star as Marie Laveau, Queenie, and the Axeman, respectively.

== Plot ==
Madison experiments with potions to improve her ghoulish appearance and her insensitivity to physical pain. She finds a potion that makes her look normal, but she still feels empty inside. After a drunken phone call from a heavily armed Hank, Cordelia blindly stumbles into Madison and has a vision of Fiona killing Madison.

As the two grow closer, Delphine suggests that Queenie's efforts to bond with the other witches will fail because she is Black. Queenie visits Marie, who mentions Delphine's heinous acts of torture and offers to let Queenie join the voodoo practitioners if she brings her Delphine.

Fiona and the Axeman have a one-night stand in a run-down apartment. The next morning, the Axeman reveals to Fiona that he has been watching her since she was an eight-year-old student at the academy. He initially saw Fiona as a daughter before he eventually fell in love with her. Fiona angrily rebuffs the Axeman's advances, but later offers to buy him a drink at a jazz bar.

Zoe tries to rehabilitate Kyle to functional humanity. After Zoe leaves Kyle alone with Madison, Cordelia warns Zoe that, since she was able to release the Axeman, Fiona might try to kill her the way she killed Madison because she thought Madison was the next Supreme. Cordelia conspires to kill Fiona. Zoe returns to her room to find Kyle having sex with Madison.

Zoe casts a spell to reattach Spalding's tongue and interrogates him. She forces him to admit that Fiona killed Madison and stabs him to death. After washing off the blood in the shower, she runs into Madison and tries to act nonchalant about witnessing Madison and Kyle's sexual encounter. While unwilling to give him up, Madison is sympathetic to Zoe's feelings and proposes that they share Kyle, leading to a threesome.

Queenie asks Delphine what her worst act was. Delphine relates that she once murdered her Black servant's newborn son, an illegitimate child fathered by Delphine's husband, and used the baby's blood as a beauty elixir, which drove the servant to suicide. Queenie is disgusted. Under the guise of getting Delphine a new hairstyle, Queenie leads her to Marie's salon, where Marie locks Delphine in a cage. After Queenie cuts Delphine with a sickle, Marie uses Delphine's blood as a beauty treatment.

== Reception ==
"The Dead" received a 2.2 18–49 ratings share and was watched by 3.995 million viewers, winning the night for cable.

"The Dead" received critical acclaim. Rotten Tomatoes reports a 100% approval rating, based on 15 reviews. The critical consensus reads, ""The Dead" throws outlandish preposterousness at the wall, not the oddest of which is monstrous Franken-sex, and it sticks – with extra stickiness." Emily VanDerWerff of The A.V. Club gave the episode a B rating, saying, "There were some genuinely eerie and even touching moments throughout the hour, especially when it came to the show's growing cast of not-so-shambling undead residents, as well as the way it increasingly is drawing up battle lines between all of the characters for the witch wars to come." Matt Fowler from IGN gave the episode a 7.7/10 rating, saying, "Coven gave us a kinder, more 'giving' Madison this week on a busy episode that may have been too cluttered."
