= The Magical Delights of Stevie Nicks =

- American Horror Story episode
- Episode no.: Season 3 Episode 10
- Directed by: Alfonso Gomez-Rejon
- Written by: James Wong
- Production code: 3ATS10
- Original air date: January 8, 2014
- Running time: 47 minutes

Guest appearances
- Angela Bassett as Marie Laveau; Danny Huston as The Axeman; Patti LuPone as Joan Ramsey; Stevie Nicks as herself; Lance Reddick as Papa Legba; Jamie Brewer as Nan; Michael Cristofer as Harrison Renard; Mike Colter as David Ames

Episode chronology
← Previous "Head"	Next → "Protect the Coven"
- American Horror Story: Coven

"The Magical Delights of Stevie Nicks" is the tenth episode of the third season of the anthology television series American Horror Story, which premiered on January 8, 2014, on the cable network FX. The episode was written by James Wong and directed by Alfonso Gomez-Rejon.

In this episode, Fiona (Jessica Lange) tries to out the next Supreme with a visit by Stevie Nicks and Madison (Emma Roberts) tries to eliminate her competition for the Supremacy. This episode marks Nicks' acting debut. She agreed to do the show based on her love of Glee, another show from the same creative team. Angela Bassett, Danny Huston and Patti LuPone guest star as Marie Laveau, the Axeman, and Joan Ramsey, respectively. This episode is rated TV-MA (LV).

== Plot ==
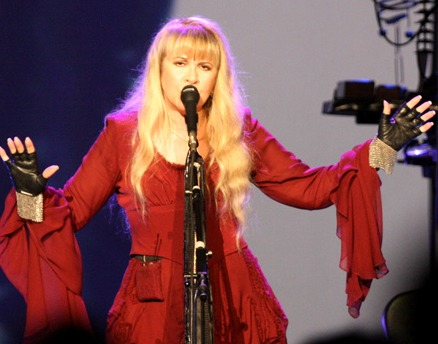
Stevie Nicks performing in 2011

At night, Marie is awakened by an ancient spiritual entity, Papa Legba, who demands that she pay his price. She wanders into a maternity ward and steals a newborn baby. The next day, after learning that Hank was hired by Marie, Fiona chastises Cordelia for endangering the coven by marrying Hank and plans a scheme against the witch hunters.

Misty is thrilled when Fiona introduces her to her idol, Stevie Nicks, who gifts Misty her trademark shawl and wishes her luck with the Seven Wonders trial. Madison tells Zoe and Nan that since being revived, her heart murmur has disappeared, making her eligible to be the new Supreme. Nan counters by saying she could also be the new Supreme, as she has developed mind control powers.

Fiona casts a spell that ruins the Delphi Trust financially, and the company headquarters are raided by the FBI. Hank's father Harrison suspects the witches and plans a retaliation.

At a funeral procession for those killed at Marie's salon, Madison challenges Misty that she is just as powerful as her. She proves this by resurrecting a man at the cemetery. As Misty stands over the man's now-empty casket, Madison strikes her over the head with a brick and knocks her into the casket. Madison leaves with Misty's shawl as two enchanted gravediggers push the casket into a crypt.

Zoe and Nan learn of Luke's death at the hospital. They visit Joan, who reveals that she had Luke cremated, thus rendering his resurrection impossible. Enraged, Nan says she knows Joan murdered Luke and enchants Joan to drink a bottle of bleach, killing her.

Marie reveals to Fiona that she sold her soul to Papa Legba in order to acquire immortality; in exchange, Marie must provide an innocent soul for him once a year, starting with her own baby centuries earlier. Fiona summons Papa Legba and offers her soul in exchange for immortality, but is denied because she has no soul. As the Axeman appears to Fiona, she vows to kill all the witches of the coven.

After Nan finds the stolen newborn, Fiona and Marie drown Nan in the bathtub and offer her as a sacrifice to Papa Legba. He reluctantly accepts the substitute for the newborn and declares that Fiona and Marie are "big trouble" together.

== Reception ==
Rotten Tomatoes reports a 77% approval rating, based on 13 reviews. The critical consensus reads, "The titular rock star provides grounding for "The Magical Delights of Stevie Nicks", an enjoyably odd episode that becomes bolder as it progresses, even if the characters and storylines grow more difficult to track." Emily VanDerWerff of The A.V. Club gave the episode an A− rating, saying, ""The Magical Delights of Stevie Nicks" is by far the best episode of this season of American Horror Story. Freed from the constraints of its endless circling and with an actual villain to face off with, the show's characters start actually doing stuff, and the series' momentum grows exponentially." However, she added: "It's also a completely ridiculous episode of television." Matt Fowler from IGN gave the episode a 7.3/10 rating, saying, "While offering up a handful of surprising moments, "The Magical Delights of Stevie Nicks" was still Coven's weakest entry. The sick and depraved danger fell by the wayside, replaced with soap-y Supreme competitiveness."

The episode received a 1.8 18–49 ratings share and was watched by 3.49 million viewers in its original American broadcast, a decrease from the previous episode.
