= The Sacred Taking =

- American Horror Story episode
- Episode no.: Season 3 Episode 8
- Directed by: Alfonso Gomez-Rejon
- Written by: Ryan Murphy
- Production code: 3ATS08
- Original air date: December 4, 2013
- Running time: 44 minutes

Guest appearances
- Angela Bassett as Marie Laveau; Danny Huston as The Axeman; Gabourey Sidibe as Queenie; Patti LuPone as Joan Ramsey; Josh Hamilton as Hank Foxx; Jamie Brewer as Nan; Alexander Dreymon as Luke Ramsey

Episode chronology
| ← Previous "The Dead" | Next → "Head" |
- American Horror Story: Coven

"The Sacred Taking" is the eighth episode of the third season of the anthology television series American Horror Story, which premiered on December 4, 2013, on the cable network FX. The episode was written by Ryan Murphy and directed by Alfonso Gomez-Rejon.

In this episode, Fiona (Jessica Lange) must take her life in order to undertake a ritual to find the next Supreme. This episode is rated TV-MA (LV). Angela Bassett, Gabourey Sidibe, Danny Huston, and Patti LuPone guest star as Marie Laveau, Queenie, the Axeman, and Joan Ramsey, respectively.

== Plot ==
Zoe and Madison attempt to bring Queenie back to the academy, but she says she is now with Marie. Luke's mother, Joan, chastises him for visiting the girls at the academy, forcing him to strip and giving him an enema.

As Cordelia shares her plan to kill Fiona with Zoe, Madison, and Nan, Misty arrives at the academy, seeking protection from a witch hunter. She is accompanied by Myrtle, who is now almost fully healed and declares that Misty is the next Supreme due to her resurrection abilities. The coven prepares for the Sacred Taking, a ritual in which the current Supreme takes her own life to ensure the safety of the coven. Misty does not wish to become the next Supreme, but Cordelia tells her no one gets to choose.

Fiona—whose health is deteriorating quickly as a new Supreme is rising—discovers Madison in her room, who lies that she is the next Supreme by reviving herself. Madison tells Fiona she can either burn at the stake for killing her or commit suicide by swallowing pills. Myrtle then appears, convincing Fiona that the Axeman will abandon her on her deathbed. Fiona takes the pills and lies in her bed until Spalding's ghost informs her of the coven's deception, revealing that it was Misty who resurrected Madison. Fiona vomits the pills and vows revenge on Spalding's life and her own.

Queenie secretly brings food to an imprisoned Delphine, who begs for release. Marie arrives and taunts Delphine, who remains proud until Marie severs her hand.

Nan argues with Zoe and Madison over their belief that she is not the next Supreme, storming off to visit Luke. Joan discovers the two of them but is soon shot by a rifle, followed by Luke, who was attempting to protect Nan. After revealing to the coven that she is still alive, Fiona follows Misty to the Ramsey house. Fiona challenges Misty to resurrect Joan, which she does before collapsing. Zoe warns Kyle that the coven is under attack. Kyle professes his love for Zoe while a distraught Madison overhears them.

The next morning, Fiona tells Cordelia that she is proud of her daughter's attempt to kill her. A package arrives at the academy, which Fiona opens to discover Delphine's severed head, gasping for help.

== Reception ==
Rotten Tomatoes reports an 81% approval rating, based on 16 reviews. The critical consensus reads, "The polished writing and creative direction turn "The Sacred Taking" into a more-than watchable transitional episode, speckled with touching, human moments." Emily VanDerWerff of The A.V. Club gave the episode a B rating, saying, ""The Sacred Taking" is just good enough to make me realize how much this season has been lacking, in ways both major and minor." Matt Fowler from IGN gave the episode a 7.6/10 rating, writing, "Coven is still wickedly watchable, but it does run in circles. Even more so than Asylum."

"The Sacred Taking" received a 2.2 18–49 ratings share and was watched by 4.07 million viewers in its original American broadcast, winning the night for cable.
