= The Seven Wonders (American Horror Story) =

- American Horror Story episode
- Episode no.: Season 3 Episode 13
- Directed by: Alfonso Gomez-Rejon
- Written by: Douglas Petrie
- Production code: 3ATS13
- Original air date: January 29, 2014
- Running time: 48 minutes

Guest appearances
- Danny Huston as The Axeman; Gabourey Sidibe as Queenie; Stevie Nicks as herself; Lance Reddick as Papa Legba; Kyle Secor as Bill

Episode chronology
← Previous "Go to Hell"	Next → "Monsters Among Us"
- American Horror Story: Coven

"The Seven Wonders" is the thirteenth and final episode of the third season of the anthology television series American Horror Story, which premiered on January 29, 2014, on the cable network FX. The episode was written by Douglas Petrie and directed by Alfonso Gomez-Rejon.

In the episode, the remaining witches compete to perform the Seven Wonders in order to find out who is the next Supreme. After the new Supreme rises, the Coven goes public with their powers. Stevie Nicks guest stars as herself at the beginning of the episode, singing "Seven Wonders" as the girls prepare.

== Plot ==
Young witches at Robichaux's Academy prepare for the trials of the Seven Wonders to determine who will become the next Supreme. Zoe, Madison, Queenie and Misty all pass the trials of telekinesis and mind control. Reaching the trial of astral projection, Zoe, Madison, and Queenie successfully travel to and from their personal hell, but Misty's spirit is trapped in hers and her body turns to ashes. During the trial of teleportation, Zoe accidentally kills herself and Queenie fails to revive her. Madison proves her power by reviving a dead fly, thus passing the next trial, but she refuses to revive Zoe out of spite.

Upset that Madison may be the next Supreme, Myrtle convinces Cordelia to attempt the Wonders herself, claiming she may have been empowering the young witches the whole time without realizing her own power. Madison fails at divination, but Cordelia passes all seven trials, bringing Zoe back to life as the last one, upon which she is crowned the new Supreme.

Frustrated, Madison threatens to expose the coven to the public, but she is murdered by Kyle for refusing to revive Zoe. Spalding takes Madison's corpse. Cordelia, however, decides to go public with the existence of witches anyway, drawing hundreds of girls to Miss Robichaux's. Zoe and Queenie form a new council while Myrtle insists to be burned at stake again for her crimes not to tarnish the witches' reputation.

Cordelia is confronted by Fiona, who had feigned her death by implanting false memories in the Axeman's mind. Weakened by Cordelia's ascension, Fiona dies in Cordelia's arms and wakes up in hell shared with the Axeman. Later, Cordelia, Zoe, Queenie and Kyle welcome new students at Miss Robichaux's.

== Reception ==
Rotten Tomatoes reports a 62% approval rating, based on 13 reviews. The critical consensus reads, ""The Seven Wonders" doesn't quite deliver the payoff viewers might have hoped for, but it does curb the season's downward slope with a decently entertaining and visually impressive finale." Matt Fowler from IGN gave the episode a rating of 8.0, adding, "There were still a few head-scratching moments, but essentially "The Seven Wonders" put a bow on the season – with the few remaining villains getting their just desserts." Emily VanDerWerff of The A.V. Club rated the episode a C−, stating, "It seemed beyond the writers on Coven, who revealed in "The Seven Wonders" that they were similarly incapable of getting us interested in the actual end games of all of these characters."

The episode received a 2.2 18–49 ratings share and was watched by 4.24 million viewers in its original American broadcast, a marked increase from the previous episode. This episode had the most viewers of any finale in the entire series.
