= Bitchcraft (American Horror Story) =

- American Horror Story episode
- Four young witches with their mentor
- Episode no.: Season 3 Episode 1
- Directed by: Alfonso Gomez-Rejon
- Written by: Ryan Murphy & Brad Falchuk
- Production code: 3ATS01
- Original air date: October 9, 2013
- Running time: 49 minutes

Guest appearances
- Angela Bassett as Marie Laveau; Gabourey Sidibe as Queenie; Jamie Brewer as Nan; Grey Damon as Archie Brener; Ian Anthony Dale as Dr. David Zhong

Episode chronology
| ← Previous "Madness Ends" | Next → "Boy Parts" |
- American Horror Story: Coven

"Bitchcraft" is the premiere episode of the third season of the anthology television series American Horror Story, which premiered on October 9, 2013, on the cable network FX. The episode title is a portmanteau of the words bitch and witchcraft.

This episode was nominated for Primetime Emmy Awards for Outstanding Costumes for a Miniseries, Movie or a Special and Outstanding Writing for a Miniseries, Movie or a Dramatic Special.

The episode introduces a group of four young witches who are given instruction in how to use their powers at a boarding school in New Orleans run by Cordelia Foxx (Sarah Paulson). Flashbacks tell the story of the cruel Delphine LaLaurie (Kathy Bates), a 19th-century New Orleans socialite who mutilated slaves as a part of her rituals for everlasting life. In the contemporary storyline, the world's most powerful witch and Foxx's mother Fiona Goode (Jessica Lange) excavates LaLaurie in order to learn her secrets. Angela Bassett and Gabourey Sidibe guest star as Marie Laveau and Queenie, respectively.

"Bitchcraft" held the highest ratings of any episode of American Horror Story, before it was surpassed a year later by the fourth-season premiere episode "Monsters Among Us". This episode is rated TV-MA (LSV).

== Plot ==
=== 1834 ===
Wealthy New Orleans socialite Madame Delphine LaLaurie washes her face with human blood harvested from her slaves as a beauty treatment. After discovering her daughter had sex with Bastien, a slave, Delphine has a bull's head put over Bastien's head, resembling the Minotaur. As revenge, voodoo priestess and Bastien's lover Marie Laveau tricks Delphine into drinking a false love potion that makes her collapse.

=== 2013 ===
Zoe Benson loses her virginity to her boyfriend Charlie, which causes him to die from an apparent brain aneurysm. Her mother reveals Zoe is a witch and sends her to Miss Robichaux's Academy for Exceptional Young Ladies, a school for witches in New Orleans where she meets the headmistress, Cordelia Foxx, who explains that every witch possesses a power of her own, but in each generation there is the Supreme, an all-powerful witch. She also mentions that young witch Misty Day was burned alive a few months earlier after she brought a bird back to life. The other students are Nan, who can read the minds of others, Queenie, who can make injuries she inflicts on her body appear on whomever she chooses without harming herself, calling herself a human voodoo doll, and Madison Montgomery, a teenage former actress who can move objects with her mind.

Madison befriends Zoe and takes her to a fraternity party. There, Zoe meets frat boy Kyle Spencer, who immediately falls for her. Meanwhile, Madison is drugged by Kyle's fraternity brother Archie Brener who, along with his fellow fraternity brothers, gang-rapes her. Kyle tries to stop them but is knocked unconscious as they flee on a bus. Madison vengefully flips their bus over.

Fiona Goode, the current Supreme and Cordelia's estranged mother, arrives at the school after hearing of Misty. Fiona takes the girls on a field trip to teach them about the history of witches in New Orleans, and Nan leads them to a tour of Delphine's mansion. The tour guide reveals that Delphine's body has never been found, but Nan tells Fiona that she can tell where Delphine is buried.

At a hospital, Zoe discovers Kyle has died and Brener has survived. She rapes an unconscious Brener, killing him by causing a brain aneurysm.

That night, Fiona has an alive Delphine dug up and brought to the academy.

== Reception ==
In its original American broadcast, "Bitchcraft" received a 3.0 18–49 ratings share and was watched by 5.54 million viewers, which was the highest total viewers of any American Horror Story episode until the fourth-season premiere "Monsters Among Us".

Rotten Tomatoes reports an 80% approval rating, based on 15 reviews. The critical consensus reads, ""Bitchcraft" jump-starts American Horror Story: Coven with an ambitious setup, lively characters, and stylized action, though the overall narrative may come off shallower than intended." Entertainment Weekly awarded the episode with a series high rating of A−, writing, "The season opener, "Bitchcraft", is a witty critique of our cultural uneasiness with female power, sexual and otherwise" and applauded the strong characters: "[Ryan Murphy's] sharp take on a woman's role is both funny and mordantly serious." Cinema Blend gave the episode 4 out of 5 stars, stating, "The season premiere offers a little bit of everything we've come to appreciate about American Horror Story, in that it pulls no punches, twisting violence, sex and gore into a wickedly dark but altogether entrancing introduction to Ryan Murphy and Brad Falchuk's next dark tale."

Emily VanDerWerff of The A.V. Club gave the episode a C+, citing uncertainty about the tone of the program but hope that the rest of the season will be good. Her review ends, "Yes, we know vaguely what the show's approach is going to be, and yes, we can expect that when Lange and Paulson are on screen, things will be pretty good. But we're also left wondering whether that minotaur is meant to be a campy joke or a very real horror and whether anyone involved understands what the divergence point is between those two things."

At The New York Times, Neil Genzlinger characterized the episode as "an eclectic mix" that "ricochets raucously between hilarious camp and blunt brutality." Genzlinger notes that thanks to the cast, such drastic shifts work "particularly well" in this episode. Along similar lines, The Huffington Post writer Maggie Furlong pronounced the episode "delightful," "fun," and "accessible," with a "lighter, more comedic tone" than previous seasons of the show. Rakesh Satyal of Vulture awarded the episode 4 out of 5 stars, calling it "one action-packed, satisfying, yet hurl-worthy episode".
