= Head (American Horror Story) =

- American Horror Story episode
- Episode no.: Season 3 Episode 9
- Directed by: Howard Deutch
- Written by: Tim Minear
- Production code: 3ATS09
- Original air date: December 11, 2013
- Running time: 43 minutes

Guest appearances
- Angela Bassett as Marie Laveau; Gabourey Sidibe as Queenie; Patti LuPone as Joan Ramsey; Josh Hamilton as Hank Foxx; Jamie Brewer as Nan; Alexander Dreymon as Luke Ramsey; Michael Cristofer as Harrison Renard; Leslie Jordan as Quentin Fleming; Robin Bartlett as Cecily Pembroke; Mike Colter as David Ames

Episode chronology
← Previous "The Sacred Taking"	Next → "The Magical Delights of Stevie Nicks"
- American Horror Story: Coven

"Head" is the ninth episode of the third season of the anthology television series American Horror Story, which premiered on December 11, 2013, on the cable network FX. The episode was written by Tim Minear and directed by Howard Deutch.

In this episode, Fiona (Jessica Lange) looks to form an alliance with Marie Laveau (Angela Bassett) while Cordelia (Sarah Paulson)'s attacker is revealed. Angela Bassett, Gabourey Sidibe, and Patti LuPone guest star as Marie Laveau, Queenie, and Joan Ramsey, respectively. This episode is rated TV-MA (LSV).

== Plot ==
Fiona visits Marie's salon to return Delphine's head and propose an alliance, suggesting that the witch hunters will next target the voodoo witches, but Marie refuses, secretly working with the hunters herself. As Fiona leaves, Marie orders Queenie to burn Delphine's head, but Queenie instead attempts to educate Delphine on racism by forcing her to watch Alex Haley's Roots. After failing to make Delphine understand her Black heritage, Queenie plays videos of civil rights-era news footage, accompanied by spirituals, which moves Delphine to tears.

Hank, who was trained to be a witch hunter since childhood and married Cordelia to infiltrate the coven, travels to Atlanta to meet with his father Harrison Renard, the CEO of the Delphi Trust, an asset management company used as a front for a witch-hunting organization. Harrison urges Hank to reconcile with Cordelia and resume his role as a spy in the coven. Hank is upset to learn that the organization was responsible for the acid attack on Cordelia, and Harrison reminds him that their marriage is only a pretense.

Throwing a luncheon for the Witches' Council, Myrtle poisons and murders Cecily and Quentin to avenge herself and extract one eye from each of them with a melon baller. Myrtle uses the eyes to restore Cordelia's eyesight, causing Cordelia to lose her power of second sight.

When Zoe, Madison, and Nan enter Luke's hospital room, Joan blames the witches for her son's coma until Nan uses her clairvoyance to read Luke's mind. Joan is grateful for Nan's miraculous intervention, but when Nan reveals that Luke knows Joan murdered her unfaithful husband, Joan throws Nan out. Luke awakens and accuses Joan of murdering his father, prompting her to smother Luke with a pillow.

After discovering Kyle in Zoe's room, Fiona mostly restores him and recruits him as a bodyguard for the coven.

While using a voodoo doll to torment Hank, Marie calls him and demands that he kill the witches by that night. After Cordelia announces her plans to file for divorce, Hank raids Marie's salon and guns down many of the voodoo witches. As he points his shotgun at Marie, Queenie finds a handgun and shoots herself through the mouth, killing Hank and seemingly herself. Marie seeks refuge at Miss Robichaux's.

== Reception ==
Rotten Tomatoes reports a 77% approval rating, based on 13 reviews. The critical consensus reads, ""Head" churns out terrific dialogue and a series of surprising plot twists, even as the sheer number of narrative arcs and political themes induce a certain amount of viewer fatigue." Emily VanDerWerff of The A.V. Club gave the episode a C− rating, saying, "There's a lot of "Head" that sort of feels like it works, particularly in the closing passages, where the episode almost manages that American Horror Story thing where a bunch of disparate elements the series has been building all season come together in a giant gumbo of wackadoo... But then I look at the episode and the season as a whole, and I'm just exhausted by it, and not in a good way." Matt Fowler from IGN gave the episode a 7.7/10 rating, stating, "The Hank storyline and his unexpected, violent turn on Laveau was very well done. The rest of "Head" felt undercooked though... I appreciate that the show takes risks with its mesh of tones, but there also comes a point where you just can't take away anything meaningful from a scene featuring a sassy head. Even if it's Kathy Bates."

"Head" received a 2.1 18–49 ratings share and was watched by 3.94 million viewers in its original American broadcast, a slight decrease from the previous episode.
