= Alfonso Gomez-Rejon =

American film and television director

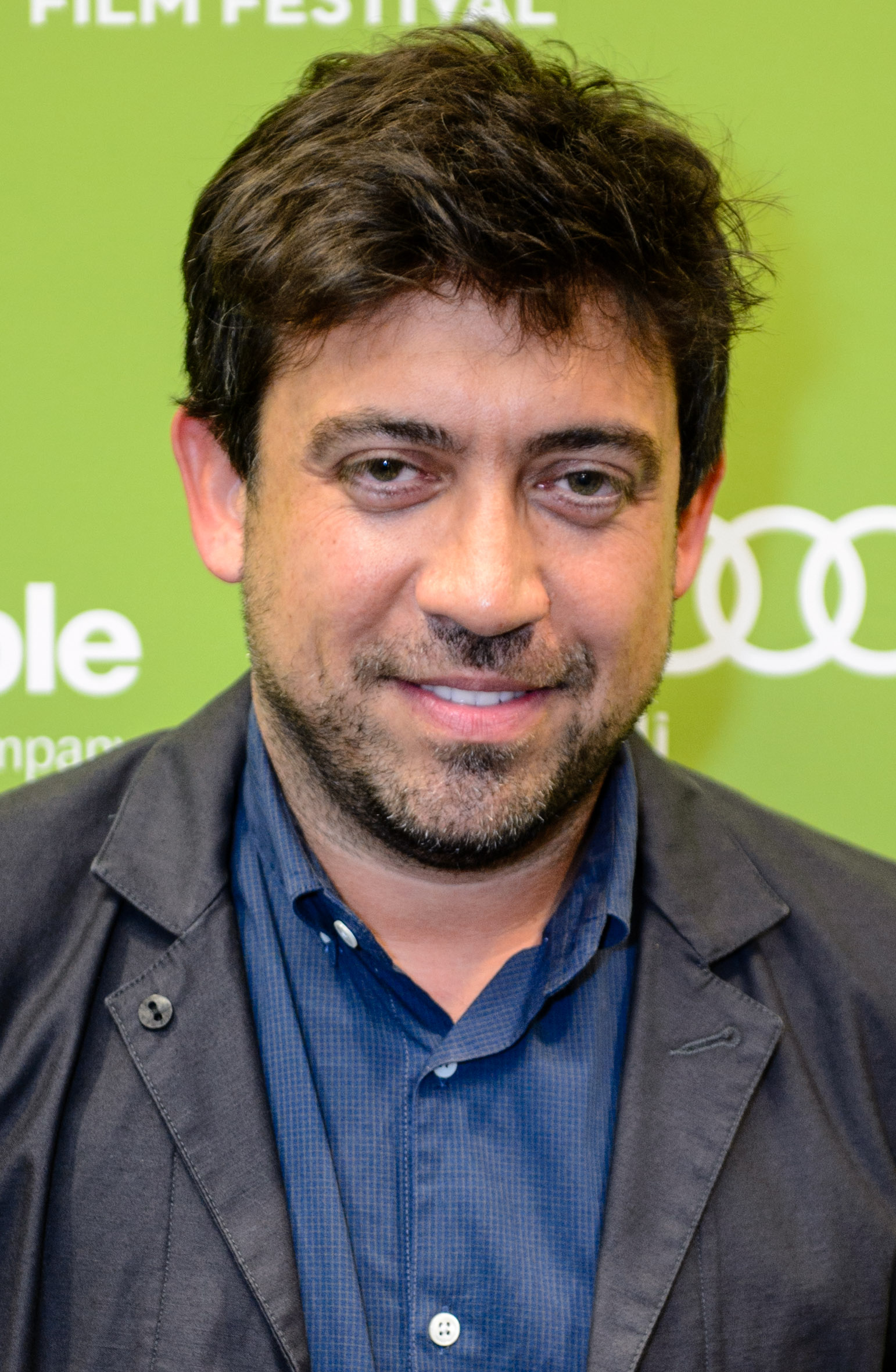
- Rejon in 2015
- Born: November 6, 1972 (age 53); Laredo, Texas, US
- Education: New York University (BFA); American Film Institute (MFA)
- Occupation: Film director
- Years active: 1991–present

Alfonso Gomez-Rejon (sometimes Alfonso Gómez-Rejón; born November 6, 1972, in Laredo, Texas) is an American film and television director. He made his directorial film debut with the slasher film The Town That Dreaded Sundown (2014). He has since directed the coming of age film Me and Earl and the Dying Girl (2015), and the historical drama The Current War (2017).

His television program credits include the FOX teen musical series Glee (2010–2012), the FX horror series American Horror Story (2011–2014; 2026), and the Amazon Prime limited series Hunters (2020). He received a nomination for the Primetime Emmy Award for Outstanding Directing For a Miniseries or Movie for American Horror Story: Coven.

== Life and career ==
=== Early life ===
Alfonso, who is of Mexican-American descent, was born and raised in Laredo, Texas on the US/Mexico border where he attended St. Augustine High School. He received his BFA from New York University and his MFA from the AFI Conservatory. He dedicated Me and Earl and the Dying Girl to his father, Julio C. Gomez Rejon, MD.

In high school, Rejon would "borrow a friend's camera" and "make shorts in lieu of presenting a report in front of the class." He began his professional career as personal assistant to Martin Scorsese, Nora Ephron, Robert De Niro and Alejandro González Iñárritu before transitioning into a second unit director for feature films, and becoming a television and commercial director. Much of his time as a personal assistant was spent on the sets of major motion pictures. Gomez-Rejon then gained extensive experience as a second unit director, including such films as Babel, Julie & Julia and Argo. He cast most of the "unknown parts" in Babel, which earned him a chance to assist Ryan Murphy in finding authentic Balinese personnel for Eat Pray Love.

=== Television commercials ===
Prior to and during the September 21, 2010 season 2 premiere (episode "Audition") of Glee, American Express aired a commercial for its Members Project entitled "Don't Be A Sue", in reference to Glee character Sue Sylvester who has no regard for the arts and public service.

On February 6, 2011, Chevrolet ran several Super Bowl ads. One was a 30-second ad in which the cast of Glee was asked to be spokespersons for the Chevrolet Cruze. This ad served as a teaser for a 2-minute-and-20-second ad featuring the Glee cast as singers and dancers during a Lea Michele-led rendition of "See the USA in Your Chevrolet" that aired during the Super Bowl lead-out program, which was "The Sue Sylvester Shuffle" episode of Glee. A 60-second version of the ad was aired along with movie trailers at nationwide movie theaters. The "See the USA" ad was directed by Gomez-Rejon. Russell Carpenter was the director of photography.

On November 30, 2011, T-Mobile announced a surprise event at the Woodfield Mall. On December 1, 2011, Gomez-Rejon directed about six surprise singing and dancing mall performances of "Home for the Holidays" by Carly Foulkes and 100 Chicago-area women in magenta dresses. The performances were later edited into a music video with the hope that it would go viral. The full video that has been posted on YouTube has a run time of 3:48 and it will be presented in a 60-second national television commercial starting on December 12. The video was produced by Ridley Scott and Tony Scott's RSA Films. The musical director was Paul Mirkovich.

=== Television programs ===
Eventually Murphy sought Gomez-Rejon to direct Glee, where he earned his first episodic television directorial credits for executive producers Murphy, Brad Falchuk, and Dante Di Loreto. He credits Murphy for nurturing his early development. In season 1, he directed "Laryngitis" (episode 18, May 11, 2010). In season 2, he directed "Grilled Cheesus" (episode 3, October 5, 2010), "A Very Glee Christmas" (episode 10, December 7, 2010) and "Born This Way" (episode 18, April 26, 2011). In season 3, he directed "Asian F" (episode 3, October 4, 2011).

A new show by Murphy, Falchuk and Di Loreto as executive producers, American Horror Story, debuted in October 2011, and Gomez-Rejon has directed two episodes from the first season: "Home Invasion" (episode 2, October 12, 2011) and "Birth" (episode 11, December 14, 2011). Rejon later returned for the second and third season.

Gomez-Rejon was among the creative contributors named in the Golden Globe Award for Best Miniseries or Television Film nomination at the 71st Golden Globe Awards for American Horror Story: Coven as Co-Executive Producer/Director. His role as a producing director meant he had a more regular dialogue with Murphy because he was a creative contributor to all episodes whereas when he had been an episodic director, he had only been involved in the episodes that he shot. He also worked more closely with the showrunner on casting decisions. He was nominated for a Primetime Emmy at the 66th Primetime Emmy Awards for Primetime Emmy Award for Outstanding Directing for a Miniseries, Movie or a Dramatic Special for his work directing the American Horror Story: Coven episode "Bitchcraft". He is also credited with a nomination for Primetime Emmy Award for Outstanding Miniseries since he served as Co-Executive Producer of the series.

=== Feature films ===
Me and Earl and the Dying Girl, which he directed, was a selection for the U.S. Dramatic Competition at the 2015 Sundance Film Festival. It won the award as well as the US drama audience prize.

Gomez-Rejon was attached to direct Will Smith in the New York-set indie drama Collateral Beauty, scripted by Allan Loeb. However, he later dropped out of the project due to creative differences.

Gomez-Rejon directed the historical drama The Current War.

=== Prospective projects ===
On November 13, 2015, Gomez-Rejon is set to direct Let It Bleed, a crime thriller based on his early life in Laredo, Texas. On March 31, 2016, Gomez-Rejon is set to direct the film adaptation of Delia Ephron's novel Siracusa. On May 6, 2016, Gomez-Rejon is set to direct the film A Foreigner based on David Grann's 2011 article A Murder Foretold, starring Oscar Isaac. On April 12, 2018, Gomez-Rejon is set to direct Limelight, the biopic of Peter Gatien the owner of the nightclub of the same name for Amazon Studios. On November 7, 2019, Gomez-Rejon is set to direct the Walter Cronkite film Newsflash with Chris Pine set to portray Cronkite.

On May 19, 2020, Gomez-Rejon is set to direct the series adaptation of Edna Ferber's novel Giant. On July 27, 2021, Gomez-Rejon is set to direct the film adaptation of Jonathan Lethem's novel The Fortress of Solitude. On April 28, 2023, Gomez-Rejon is set to direct the untitled pilot for a series based on the life and career of Fernando Valenzuela. On March 27, 2025, Gomez-Rejon is set to direct the pilot for the series Stowaway based on the life of Juan Carlos Guzmán with Oscar Isaac set to portray Guzmán. On October 19, 2026, Gomez-Rejon is set to direct the pilot for the series adaptation of Roberto Aguirre-Sacasa's horror comic Afterlife with Archie.

== Filmography ==
=== Film ===
Director

- The Town That Dreaded Sundown (2014)
- Me and Earl and the Dying Girl (2015)
- The Current War (2017)

Second unit director

- Lucky Numbers (2000)
- Bewitched (2005)
- Babel (2006) (Also casting consultant)
- State of Play (2009)
- Julie & Julia (2009)
- Eat Pray Love (2010) (Also casting director)
- The Eagle (2011)
- Argo (2012)

Other credits

Year	Title	Role
1996	Grace of My Heart	Special Thanks
2003	21 Grams	Assistant

=== Television ===
Year	Title	Episode(s)	Notes
2010-2012	Glee	"Laryngitis"	
2010-2012	Glee	"Grilled Cheesus"	
2010-2012	Glee	"A Very Glee Christmas"	
2010-2012	Glee	"Born This Way"	
2010-2012	Glee	"Asian F"	
2010-2012	Glee	"Michael"	
2010-2012	Glee	"Britney 2.0	
2010-2012	Glee	"The Break-Up"	
2011-2014, 2026	American Horror Story	"Home Invasion"	
2011-2014, 2026	American Horror Story	"Birth"	
2011-2014, 2026	American Horror Story	"I Am Anne Frank (Part 2)"	
2011-2014, 2026	American Horror Story	"Spilt Milk"	
2011-2014, 2026	American Horror Story	"Madness Ends"	
2011-2014, 2026	American Horror Story	"Bitchcraft"	Nominated– Primetime Emmy Award for Outstanding Directing
2011-2014, 2026	American Horror Story	"The Replacements"	
2011-2014, 2026	American Horror Story	"The Sacred Taking"	
2011-2014, 2026	American Horror Story	"The Magical Delights of Stevie Nicks"	
2011-2014, 2026	American Horror Story	"Go to Hell"	
2011-2014, 2026	American Horror Story	"The Seven Wonders"	
2011-2014, 2026	American Horror Story	"Massacres and Matinees"	
2011-2014, 2026	American Horror Story	"Is That All There Is?"	
2011-2014, 2026	American Horror Story	"The Baddest Witch of Them All"	
2013	The Carrie Diaries	"Lie with Me"	
2014	Red Band Society	"Pilot"	
2019	Chambers	"Pilot"	
2019	Chambers	"Right to Know"	
2020	Hunters	"Pilot"	
2021	Olga Dies Dreaming	"Pilot"	Unaired
