= The Replacements (American Horror Story) =

- American Horror Story episode
- Episode no.: Season 3 Episode 3
- Directed by: Alfonso Gomez-Rejon
- Written by: James Wong
- Production code: 3ATS03
- Original air date: October 23, 2013
- Running time: 53 minutes

Guest appearances
- Angela Bassett as Marie Laveau; Gabourey Sidibe as Queenie; Patti LuPone as Joan Ramsey; Jamie Brewer as Nan; Christine Ebersole as Anna-Leigh Leighton; Alexander Dreymon as Luke Ramsey; Riley Voelkel as Young Fiona Goode; Mare Winningham as Alicia Spencer

Episode chronology
← Previous "Boy Parts"	Next → "Fearful Pranks Ensue"
- American Horror Story: Coven

"The Replacements" is the third episode of the third season of the anthology television series American Horror Story, which premiered on October 23, 2013, on the cable network FX. This episode is rated TV-MA (LSV).

This episode focuses on Fiona (Jessica Lange) taking on Madison as a protégé (Emma Roberts) and Zoe (Taissa Farmiga) tries to give Kyle (Evan Peters) his life back. Angela Bassett, Gabourey Sidibe, and Patti LuPone guest star as Marie Laveau, Queenie, and Joan Ramsey, respectively.

== Plot ==
=== 1971 ===
At Miss Robichaux's Academy, Anna-Leigh Leighton, headmistress and reigning Supreme, explains to a young Fiona that in order to become the Supreme, a witch must be able to perform the "Seven Wonders". Fiona points out that, as the new Supreme begins to flourish, the old one begins to fade, noting Anna-Leigh's numerous recent health complications. When Anna-Leigh declares Fiona will never be the next Supreme, Fiona slits Anna-Leigh's throat, killing her.

=== 2013 ===
When Madison and Nan visit the new next-door neighbor, Luke Ramsey, to welcome him with a cake, Madison attempts to flirt with him, angering his overly religious mother Joan. As Joan throws the girls out of her house, Madison angrily lights the curtains on fire with her mind, displaying a previously unknown pyrokinesis.

After Misty nurses Kyle back to health, Zoe returns him to his single mother, Alicia, unaware that she had been sexually abusing her son. When Alicia tries to molest Kyle again, he bludgeons her to death with a trophy. Later, Zoe arrives to find Alicia's dead body and Kyle covered in blood.

Cordelia is told by her doctor that she can never get pregnant and visits Marie, begging her to perform a voodoo fertility ritual on her. Marie explains the ritual before mocking Cordelia, telling her that she will never help the daughter of her sworn enemy.

Fiona turns Delphine into the maid of the academy. When Delphine hurls racial slurs towards Queenie, Fiona punishes Delphine by forcing her to become Queenie's personal slave. While alone with Queenie, Delphine is horrified when Bastien, who has survived in his Minotaur form, appears outside. Delphine reveals her true identity to Queenie, who goes outside to confront the Minotaur and ends up identifying with him, as they both want love and have been ostracized. As Queenie offers herself to the Minotaur, he grabs her by the mouth.

A weakened Fiona is informed that she has terminal cancer. After learning of Madison's growing power, Fiona believes she is next in line to become the Supreme and takes her under her wing. Fiona tells Madison about her terminal cancer and declares she is the next Supreme. Fiona hands Madison a knife and begs her to kill her. Madison refuses, and in the ensuing struggle, Fiona ends up cutting Madison's throat, killing her. Fiona instructs the mute butler, Spalding, to dispose of Madison's body.

== Reception ==
"The Replacements" received a 2.1 18–49 ratings share and was watched by 3.78 million viewers.

"The Replacements" received critical acclaim. Rotten Tomatoes reports a 100% approval rating, based on 14 reviews. The critical consensus reads, ""The Replacements" focuses on the weird and the wonderful as it tackles taboos and a shocking death." At Vulture, Rakesh Satyal praised Angela Bassett for "straight-up killing it" and offered praise for the comedic subplot involving LaLaurie. Stating that the episode "upped the ante", he awarded it a full five out of five stars. Emily VanDerWerff of The A.V. Club gave the episode a B rating for "The Replacements". Matt Fowler from IGN gave the episode an 8/10 rating, calling it a great episode and Madison's "shocking" death "the best thing Coven's done so far". He did however say, "I don't mind things that are batshit nuts. Not at all. But I'm also not going to emotionally invest in those things as much as I will more centralized themes."
