= The Axeman Cometh (American Horror Story) =

- American Horror Story episode
- Episode no.: Season 3 Episode 6
- Directed by: Michael Uppendahl
- Written by: Douglas Petrie
- Production code: 3ATS06
- Original air date: November 13, 2013
- Running time: 42 minutes

Guest appearances
- Angela Bassett as Marie Laveau; Danny Huston as The Axeman; Gabourey Sidibe as Queenie; Josh Hamilton as Hank Foxx; Alexandra Breckenridge as Kaylee Rowe; Jamie Brewer as Nan; Grace Gummer as Millie Bishop; Andrew Leeds as Dr. Dunphy

Episode chronology
← Previous "Burn, Witch. Burn!"	Next → "The Dead"
- American Horror Story: Coven

"The Axeman Cometh" is the sixth episode of the third season of the anthology television series American Horror Story, which premiered on November 13, 2013, on the cable network FX. This episode is rated TV-MA (LSV).

This episode focuses on the girls awakening the spirit of a long-dead serial killer, The Axeman (Danny Huston). Danny Huston guest stars as the Axeman. Angela Bassett and Gabourey Sidibe guest star as Marie Laveau and Queenie, respectively.

== Plot ==
=== 1919 ===
In a manifesto printed by the local newspaper, the Axeman of New Orleans claims to be the culprit of a recent killing spree targeting women. He also announces he will murder any New Orleans citizens who do not play jazz music in their homes on the next Tuesday night. The witches of Miss Robichaux's Academy lure the Axeman in by playing opera music and stab him to death.

=== 2013 ===
Zoe, Queenie, and Nan use a spirit board to contact Madison. Instead, they contact the Axeman, whose spirit is confined to the school. Queenie and Nan refuse to participate any further, and despite warnings from Queenie, Zoe uses the spirit board alone to ask the Axeman where Madison is, promising him release. He directs Zoe to the attic, where she finds Madison's rotting corpse. Zoe is discovered by Spalding, but she knocks him unconscious. The girls interrogate and torture Spalding, who falsely confesses to killing Madison to satisfy his necrophilic impulses. Zoe does not believe Spalding killed Madison.

As Cordelia enters her room with Hank, she brushes against him and has another vision of Hank having sex with Kaylee. She vows to hold him accountable for his betrayals and furiously throws him out of the house. After touching Fiona, Cordelia has a vision of Myrtle's execution and is aghast. Fiona claims Myrtle was responsible for the acid attack, but Cordelia refuses to believe it.

Kyle arrives at Misty's swamp shack, and she bathes him. Reliving his mother's abuse, he thrashes around, violently wrecking Misty's possessions. Zoe arrives and says she needs Misty's help. In Cordelia's greenhouse, Zoe chains Kyle to the wall, and Misty agrees to resurrect Madison.

It is revealed that Hank is a witch hunter, hired six years before by Marie to kill every Salem descendant; he killed Kaylee after discovering she was a witch. At Laveau's salon, she orders Hank to bring her the heads of all the witches and to burn the school down, or she will kill him.

Misty detects bad vibes and leaves the academy, while Madison slowly recovers from her death. The Axeman's spirit terrorizes Cordelia, demanding release. Zoe, Queenie, and Nan rescue Cordelia by reciting an incantation which, unbeknownst to them, allows the Axeman to leave the academy. He finds Fiona in a bar and offers to buy her a drink.

== Reception ==
Rotten Tomatoes reports an 87% approval rating, based on 15 reviews. The critical consensus reads, ""The Axeman Cometh" drops the exciting new Axeman character and his interesting mythology into the mix, taking the focus away from the main storyline with insanely fun results." Emily VanDerWerff of The A.V. Club gave the episode a C rating, and wrote, "I realized that I don't give a good goddamn about anything that happens to anybody this season." Matt Fowler of IGN wrote, "[The episode], much like the first half of the Halloween two-parter, was incomplete. Hank's been ordered by Laveau to kill everyone at Robichaux's, Spalding's been caught red-handed as a necropheliac (nice Rocky Horror Riff Raff reference there too!), and the Axeman has his sights set on Fiona. All threads to be picked up next week. A diversionary episode, but a fun one too."

"The Axeman Cometh" received a 2.3 18–49 ratings share, up from the previous episode, and was watched by 4.16 million viewers in its original American broadcast.
