= Shotgun Man =

American spree killer

Shotgun Man was an alleged assassin and serial killer active in Chicago, Illinois, United States, in the 1910s, to whom murders by Black Hand extortionists were attributed. Most notably, Shotgun Man killed 15 Italian immigrants from January 1, 1910, to March 26, 1911, at "Death Corner", a notoriously violent Italian immigrant neighborhood at the intersection of Oak Street and Milton Avenue (now Cleveland Avenue) in what was then Chicago's Little Sicily. The area was notorious for violence committed by Italian immigrants and Italian Americans, both independently and as a result of Italian gangs, the American Mafia, and Black Hand feuding and vendettas. In March 1911, the so-called Shotgun Man reportedly murdered four people within 72 hours.

== Background ==
Although the killings were witnessed by dozens of bystanders, the Chicago police were never able to identify the murderer. However, he was said to be well known throughout the Italian community, and with the political influence of the Black Hand, residents may have been hesitant to turn in the assassin. Although the fate of Shotgun Man is unknown, he seems to have disappeared from Little Italy shortly before Prohibition, as extortion operations of the Black Hand had faded away by the end of the decade.

== See also ==
- Aldermen's wars
- Axeman of New Orleans
- Chicago Outfit
- List of fugitives from justice who disappeared
- List of homicides in Illinois § Organized crime
