= Fearful Pranks Ensue =

- American Horror Story episode
- Episode no.: Season 3 Episode 4
- Directed by: Michael Uppendahl
- Written by: Jennifer Salt
- Production code: 3ATS04
- Original air date: October 30, 2013
- Running time: 44 minutes

Guest appearances
- Angela Bassett as Marie Laveau; Gabourey Sidibe as Queenie; Josh Hamilton as Hank Foxx; Alexandra Breckenridge as Kaylee Rowe; Christine Ebersole as Anna-Leigh Leighton; Jamie Brewer as Nan; Alexander Dreymon as Luke Ramsey; Riley Voelkel as Young Fiona Goode; Michelle Page as Young Myrtle Snow; Leslie Jordan as Quentin Fleming; Robin Bartlett as Cecily Pembroke

Episode chronology
| ← Previous "The Replacements" | Next → "Burn, Witch. Burn!" |
- American Horror Story: Coven

"Fearful Pranks Ensue" is the fourth episode of the third season of the anthology television series American Horror Story, which premiered on October 30, 2013, on the cable network FX. This episode is rated TV-MA (LSV).

In this episode, the coven is visited by the Council of Witchcraft after they are notified of Madison (Emma Roberts)'s disappearance. This episode was nominated for a Primetime Emmy Award for Outstanding Sound Mixing for a Miniseries or a Movie.

== Plot ==
=== 1971 ===
Following Anna-Leigh's death, the Witches' Council announces a young Fiona as the Supreme Elect. Certain that Fiona killed Anna-Leigh and aware of Spalding's loyalty to Fiona, a young Myrtle Snow enchants Spalding's tongue in order to force him to confess the truth about the murder. Having overheard Myrtle's plan, Spalding privately tells Fiona he has always loved her before cutting out his own tongue.

=== 2013 ===
Fiona discovers a badly injured Queenie following her encounter with the Minotaur. As Queenie dies, Fiona breathes life back into her. Delphine tells Fiona it was Marie who sent the Minotaur for her. At Marie's hair salon, she is horrified to receive a package containing the still-alive Minotaur's severed head. Marie retaliates by performing a voodoo ritual to summon an army of zombies, officially ending the truce between the witches and voodoo practitioners.

At Kyle's home, Zoe goes to the kitchen to get him some food, only to discover that Kyle has escaped the house.

After lying to Cordelia that he is on a business trip, Hank meets with his mistress, Kaylee, in his hotel room in Baton Rouge. After vigorous sex, he shoots her in the head without hesitation.

Unable to hear Madison in her head, Nan summons the Witches' Council, led by Myrtle, to the academy to investigate Madison's disappearance. Convinced that Fiona is guilty, Myrtle calls Spalding as a witness, telling him to write the name of the witch responsible for severing his tongue. When Spalding writes "Myrtle Snow" on a paper, Myrtle flies into a rage, accusing Fiona of killing both Anna-Leigh and Madison. Cordelia interjects, revealing that Madison had a heart murmur that prevented her from becoming the Supreme. Elsewhere in the house, Spalding is keeping Madison's corpse as his own personal doll. Later, Fiona and Cordelia head to a bar. In the restroom, a cloaked figure throws acid on Cordelia's face.

On Halloween night, Luke visits the academy, bringing cookies to repay Nan for the cake she brought him. Shortly afterwards, Delphine's three zombified daughters appear at the door as a horde of zombies surrounds the house.

== Reception ==
"Fearful Pranks Ensue" received a 2.0 18–49 ratings share and was watched by 3.71 million viewers, winning its time slot.

Rotten Tomatoes reports an 86% approval rating, based on 14 reviews. The critical consensus reads, ""Fearful Pranks Ensue" maintains the momentum of previous episodes while further developing emerging narrative threads – and taking full advantage of an outstanding cast." Emily VanDerWerff of The A.V. Club gave the episode a B+ rating, saying, "There is nothing I could say. I could literally write the greatest review in the history of television criticism, and it wouldn't matter. The Golden Corral of terror that is American Horror Story is open for business, and all who attempt to find meaning in it shall be shot." Matt Fowler from IGN gave the episode an 8.2/10 rating, calling it a great episode, saying, "I'm still glad to see that, given the cliffhanger, Halloween night will continue. And that it looks like the best of the ghoulish evening is yet to come."
