= Joe Earle =

Joe Earle is an author and curator. He was chair of the Asia, Oceania, and Africa department at the Museum of Fine Arts, Boston. He served as Vice President and Director for the Japan Society Gallery at Japan Society from 2007 to 2011.

== Biography ==
Earle was educated at Westminster School and Oxford University, where he took a first in Chinese Language and Literature in 1974 and then joined the Far Eastern Department of the Victoria and Albert Museum, specializing in Japanese art and design. Between 1978 and 1981 he organized the contemporary design exhibition Japan Style and served as a member of the executive and academic committees of the Great Japan Exhibition (Royal Academy of Arts, 1981-2). During the same period he was responsible for the creation of a new temporary gallery of Japanese art at the V & A and an exhibition Modern Japanese Lacquer Art: A Family of Kyoto Craftsmen.

In 1983 he was appointed Keeper of the Far Eastern Department, the youngest person ever to hold such a post in a U.K. national museum, visited Japan for two months as a Japan Foundation Research Fellow and organized an exhibition of contemporary Japanese ceramics from the Kikuchi collection. For the next three years he led the project to establish a major permanent Japanese gallery at the V & A, including fund raising, supervision of design and construction and the writing and editing of the gallery book, Japanese Art and Design. The Toshiba Gallery of Japanese Art opened in December 1986.

In early 1987 he transferred at his own request to the new post of Head of Public Affairs at the V & A. During 1988 and 1989 he became increasingly involved in laying the groundwork for the Japan Festival 1991 and its flagship exhibition Visions of Japan, whose commissioning architect was Arata Isozaki. He left the employment of the museum at the beginning of 1990 and began work as a consultant both to the V & A and to Harrison/Parrott Ltd., one of the managing agents of the Japan Festival. In addition to assuming central responsibility for Visions of Japan, he acted as Exhibitions Coordinator for the whole Japan Festival, helping to fund, organize and find venues for shows including Mingei: The Living Tradition in Japanese Art; Metropolis: Tokyo Design Visions; and an exhibition of contemporary calligraphy at the University of Ulster, Coleraine.

In 1990 he co-organized the exhibition British Design 1790–1990, held at South Coast Plaza, Orange County, California. He was responsible for the 1992–94 European tour of Songs of My People, an exhibition, sponsored by TimeWarner Inc., of photographs of African-American life by African American photojournalists.

In 1997 he assisted the Courtauld Institute Galleries in their negotiations with Nihon Keizai Shimbun Inc. for the loan of impressionist paintings to Japan, curated an exhibition of the works of Shibata Zeshin at the National Museums of Scotland, and started work on a large-scale exhibition of Japanese decorative art of the Meiji period (1868–1912) from the collection of Dr. David Khalili which was shown first in Wilmington, Delaware in 1999 and then, in a revised form and with a new catalogue, at the Portland (Oregon) Museum of Art from June to September 2002. In 2001 he organized a major exhibition of the textile artist and Living National Treasure Serizawa Keisuke held at the National Museums of Scotland as part of the nationwide Japan 2001 season, and completed work on Netsuke: Fantasy and Reality in Japanese Miniature Sculpture which was shown at the Museum of Fine Arts, Boston from September 2001 to November 2002.

In February 2002 he was commissioned by Lady Sainsbury to organize an exhibition in Japan of the work of the British contemporary potter Rupert Spira which opened on October 25 2003. Starting April 2002 he was tasked by Museum of Fine Arts, Boston to computer-catalogue the museum’s extensive collection of Japanese metalwork, and sagemono craftwork, as well as 50,000 pieces of ukiyo-e in the collection which were then made available for viewing on the web.

He also conducted initial research towards a possible exhibition of the ceramics of Tomimoto Kenkichi in the U.K. and U.S. and played a part in preliminary negotiations for the Khalili collection to tour in Japan. From 1998 to 2003 he was consultant to the Japanese Department of Christie, Manson & Woods Ltd. and wrote or edited a substantial part of Christie’s regular London catalogues as well as special catalogues including the Manno Collection (June 2001) and An Important European Collection of Netsuke (November 2001). He was a Trustee of the Design Museum, London from 1987 until 2002 and has been a member of the Advisory Panel of the National Art Collections Fund since 1996. He also served on the Steering Committee of Japan 2001.

In February 2003, Joe Earle was named as first Chair of the Department of Art of Asia, Oceania and Africa at the Museum of Fine Arts, Boston, and took up his post in August of the same year. On September 4, 2007, Joe Earle took the post of Vice-President and Director of the Japan Society Gallery at Japan Society. He retired in 2011.

== Articles & publications ==
Joe Earle has edited, written or contributed to many substantial publications on Japanese art, including:

- An Introduction to Netsuke (1980) (author)
- An Introduction to Japanese Prints (1980) (author)
- Japan Style (1980) (contributor and translator)
- The Great Japan Exhibition (1981) (contributor and editor)
- The Japanese Sword (1983) (translator and editor)
- “Genji Meets Yang Guifei: A Group of Japanese Export Lacquers,” Transactions of the Oriental Ceramic Society (1982 3), 45 75
- “The Taxonomic Obsession: British Collectors and Japanese Objects, 1852 1986,” Burlington Magazine, 1005 (Dec. 1986), 864 73
- Japanese Art and Design (1986) (author and editor)
- The Khalili Collection of Japanese Art: Lacquer (1995) (editor)
- Flower Bronzes of Japan (1995) (author)
- The Index of Inro Artists (1995) (editor)
- The Khalili Collection of Japanese Art: Masterpieces by Shibata Zeshin (1996) (author and editor)
- Shadows and Reflections: Japanese Lacquer Art from the Collection of Edmund J. Lewis (Honolulu, 1996) (author and editor)
- Japanese Inro and Lacquerware from a Private Swedish Collection (London, 1996) (contributor and editor)
- Flowers of the Chisel (London, 1997) (author and editor)
- Miyabi Transformed (London, 1997) (contributor and editor)
- Shibata Zeshin - Masterpieces of Japanese Lacquer from the Khalili Collection (London, 1997) (author)
- The Robert S. Huthart Collection of Non-Iwami Netsuke (London, 1998) (contributor and editor)
- Splendors of Meiji: Treasures of Imperial Japan, Masterpieces from the Khalili Collection (Wilmington, Delaware, 1999) (author)
- Infinite Spaces: The Art and Wisdom of the Japanese Garden (translations from the 11th-century Sakuteiki) (London, 2000) (author)
- Japanese Lacquer: The Chiddingstone Castle Collection (London, 2000) (author)
- The Robert S. Huthart Collection of Iwami Netsuke (Hong Kong, 2000) (author)
- Serizawa: Master of Japanese Textile Design (Sendai, 2001) (editor and translator)
- Netsuke: Fantasy and Reality in Japanese Miniature Sculpture (Boston, 2001) (author)
- Scooping The Clouds: Seven Centuries of Ink Painting (London, 2001) (compiler and author)
- Genji and Ōmi: Imperial Album Painting (London, 2001) (compiler and author)
- “Japanese Bronzes of the Early Meiji Period (1868–1912): Meaning and Motivation,” Apollo, vol. 154, no. 477 (Nov. 2001), pp. 36–41 (author)
- Splendors of Imperial Japan: Arts of the Meiji Period from the Khalili Collection (London, 2002) (author)
- Netsuke and Inrō from European Collections (London, 2002) (author)
- “Marketing the Marvellous: The Promotion of Textiles and Ceramics in the Later Meiji Era,” Orientations, 33/7 (Sept. 2002), pp. 63–70 (author)
- Lethal Elegance: The Art of Samurai Sword Fittings (Boston, 2004) (author)
- Contemporary Clay: Japanese Ceramics for the New Century (Boston, 2005) (author)
- Arts of Japan: The John C. Weber Collection (Berlin, 2006) (contributor)
- Zeshin: The Catherine and Thomas Edson Collection, San Antonio, 2007) (contributor)
- New Bamboo: Contemporary Japanese Masters (New York, 2008) (author)
- Buriki: Japanese Tin Toys from the Golden Age of the American Automobile (New York, 2009) (author)
- Serizawa: Master of Japanese Textile Design (New Haven, 2009) (editor and translator)
- "Melk's Golden Acres," by Nobuko Takagi, in Speculative Japan (Fukuoka, 2011) (translator, under the nom de plume Dink Tanaka)
- “Kurafuto, 'Good Design,' Sake, and Soy Sauce: Consumer Ceramics in Postwar Japan,” in Birds of Dawn: Pioneers of Japan's Sôdeisha Ceramic Movement (New York, 2011) (author)
- “Japanese Contemporary Art in the Heisei Era,” by Tetsuya Ozaki, in Bye Bye Kitty!!! Between Heaven and Hell in Contemporary Japanese Art (New Haven, 2011) (translator)
- Fiber Futures: Japan's Textile Pioneers (New York, 2011) (author and translator)
