= List of awards and nominations received by American Horror Story =

Awards and nominations received by American Horror Story
Awards and nominations
Award	Wins	Nominations
Art Directors Guild Awards	3	9
American Film Institute Awards	1	1
American Society of Cinematographers Awards	0	1
Artios Awards	0	4
BET Awards	0	4
Black Reel Awards	0	4
BMI Film & TV Awards	7	7
Bram Stoker Awards	1	4
Cinema Audio Society Awards	0	5
Costume Designers Guild Awards	4	7
Critics' Choice Television Awards	4	19
Directors Guild of America Awards	0	1
Dorian Awards	6	16
Eddie Awards	0	1
Fangoria Chainsaw Awards	1	9
GLAAD Media Awards	1	2
Golden Globe Awards	2	9
Golden Nymph Awards	0	1
Golden Reel Awards	2	6
Golden Trailer Awards	3	4
Guild of Music Supervisors Awards	0	4
Hollywood Post Alliance Awards	0	1
ICG Publicists Awards	1	1
Jupiter Awards	1	1
Kerrang! Awards	0	1
Location Managers Guild Awards	1	1
Make-Up Artists and Hair Stylists Guild Awards	17	27
MTV Fandom Awards	0	1
MTV Movie & TV Awards	0	1
NAACP Image Awards	0	5
NewNowNext Awards	0	2
People's Choice Awards	1	6
Poppy Awards	2	3
Primetime Emmy Awards	16	100
PRISM Awards	1	1
Producers Guild of America Awards	0	4
Satellite Awards	3	11
Saturn Awards	0	26
Screen Actors Guild Awards	1	3
Society of Camera Operators Awards	0	1
SXSW Film Awards	0	1
TCA Awards	0	3
VES Awards	1	2
World Soundtrack Awards	0	2
Writers Guild of America Awards	0	2
Young Artist Awards	0	3

Totals (Note: Certain award groups do not simply award one winner. They acknowledge several different recipients, have runners-up, and have third place. Since this is a specific recognition and is different from losing an award, runner-up mentions are considered wins in this award tally. For simplification and to avoid errors, each award in this list has been presumed to have had a prior nomination.)
- Wins: 142
- Nominations: 367

American Horror Story is a horror television series created and produced by Ryan Murphy and Brad Falchuk. The series is broadcast on the cable television channel FX in the United States. Described as an anthology series, each season is conceived as a self-contained miniseries, following a disparate set of characters and settings, and a storyline with its own "beginning, middle, and end".

Since its debut, American Horror Story has earned mostly positive reviews from critics, and has been nominated for a variety of different awards, including nineteen Critics' Choice Television Awards (four wins), ninety-four Emmy Awards (sixteen wins), nine Golden Globe Awards (two wins), six People's Choice Awards (one win), eleven Satellite Awards (three wins), and twenty-six Saturn Awards.

Actress Jessica Lange, who was featured in the first four seasons, has won the most awards of the franchise, including the Primetime Emmy Award, the Golden Globe Award, and the Screen Actors Guild Award for her performance, while the former along with James Cromwell, who starred as Dr. Arthur Arden in the second season, subtitled Asylum, and Kathy Bates, who features since the third season, subtitled Coven, are the only performers to win an Emmy. "Welcome to Briarcliff", the first episode of Asylum, is the most nominated single episode of the series, receiving nominations for seven different awards, winning one Emmy and two Golden Reel Awards.

== For the cast ==
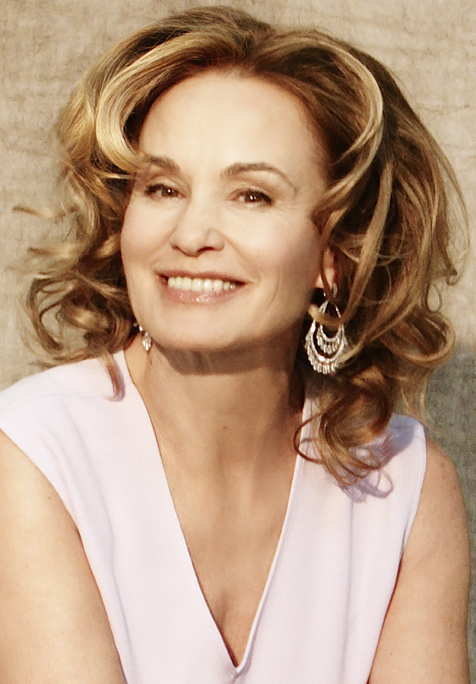
Jessica Lange has received the most awards and nominations for her performances in the series.

Total awards and nominations for the cast
Actor	Nominations	Awards
Jessica Lange	31	11
Sarah Paulson	19	6
Angela Bassett	12	0
Kathy Bates	11	1
Evan Peters	8	0
Lady Gaga	6	2
Frances Conroy	6	0
Zachary Quinto	5	2
Adina Porter	3	0
Denis O'Hare	5	0
Finn Wittrock	4	1
James Cromwell	3	1
Lily Rabe	3	0
Wes Bentley	2	0
Connie Britton	2	0
Dylan McDermott	2	0
Neal McDonough	2	0
Thomas Barbusca	1	0
Michael Chiklis	1	0
Dalton E. Gray	1	0
Neil Patrick Harris	1	0
Danny Huston	1	0
Leslie Jordan	1	0
John Carroll Lynch	1	0
Toby Nichols	1	0
Gabourey Sidibe	1	0
Rebecca Dayan	1	0

== By season ==
Total awards and nominations by season
Season	Nominations	Awards
Murder House	65	19
Asylum	89	28
Coven	74	14
Freak Show	76	21
Hotel	64	20
Roanoke	23	5
Cult	25	3
Apocalypse	20	5
1984	10	2
Double Feature	21	5
NYC	2	0
Delicate	7	3

== Accolades ==
Awards and nominations received by American Horror Story
Award	Year (Note: Indicates the year of ceremony. Each year is linked to the article about the awards held that year, wherever possible.)	Category	Recipient(s)	Result	Ref.
ATAA Awards	2021	French Dubbing Adaptation of a series	Nicolas Mourguye, Xavier Varaillon, Libra Films (for American Horror Story: 1984)	Won	
Art Directors Guild Awards	2012	One-Hour Single Camera Television Series	Mark Worthington, Edward L. Rubin, Kenneth A. Larson, Robert Bernard and Ellen Brill (for "Murder House")	Nominated	
Art Directors Guild Awards	2013	Television Movie or Mini-Series	Mark Worthington, Andrew Murdock, Phil Dagort and Ellen Brill (for "I Am Anne Frank, Part 2")	Won	
Art Directors Guild Awards	2014	Television Movie or Mini-Series	Mark Worthington, Andrew Murdock, Michelle C. Harmon, Adele Plauche, Brian A. Waits, Molly Mikula, Walter Schneider and Ellen Brill (for "Bitchcraft")	Nominated	
Art Directors Guild Awards	2015	Television Movie or Mini-Series	Mark Worthington, James F. Truesdale, Michelle C. Harmon, Brian A. Waits, Jane Fitts and Cynthia Anne Slagter (for "Massacres and Matinees")	Won	
Art Directors Guild Awards	2016	Television Movie or Mini-Series	Mark Worthington, Denise Hudson, Kevin Houlihan, Thomas T. Taylor, Kristen Davis, Lauren E. Polizzi, Phil Dagort, Ron Mason, Darcy Prevost, Robert Bernard, David Eckert and Ellen Brill (for "Checking In")	Won	
Art Directors Guild Awards	2016	Short Format: Web Series, Music Video or Commercial	Zach Mathews, Jessica Anderson and Analise Hellman (for "Hallways")	Nominated	
Art Directors Guild Awards	2017	Television Movie or Limited Series	Andrew Murdock, Eric Sundahl, Scott Cobb, Nathan W. Bailey, Easton Smith, Jamie Rama, Jane Fitts and Kathy Orlando (for "Chapter 5")	Nominated	
Art Directors Guild Awards	2018	Television Movie or Limited Series	Jeffrey Mossa, Rachel Robb Kondrath, Maren Brown, Betty Krul, Lori West, Mike Stassi and Claire Kaufman (for "Election Night" and "Winter of Our Discontent")	Nominated	
Art Directors Guild Awards	2019	Television Movie or Limited Series	Val Wilt, Mark Robert Taylor, Ryan Watson, Simon Jones, Maren Brown and Betty Krul (for "Fire and Reign")	Nominated	
American Film Institute Awards	2012	Television Programs of the Year	American Horror Story: Asylum	Won	
American Society of Cinematographers Awards	2012	Outstanding Achievement in Cinematography: Motion Picture/Miniseries	Michael Goi (for "I Am Anne Frank: Part 2")	Nominated	
Artios Awards	2012	TV Movie or Mini-Series	Robert J. Ulrich, Eric Dawson, Carol Kritzer, Eric Souliere (for American Horror Story)	Nominated	
Artios Awards	2013	TV Movie or Mini-Series	Robert J. Ulrich, Eric Dawson, Carol Kritzer, Eric Souliere (for American Horror Story: Asylum)	Nominated	
Artios Awards	2015	TV Movie or Mini-Series	Robert J. Ulrich, Eric Dawson, Carol Kritzer, Meagan Lewis, Eric Souliere (for American Horror Story: Coven)	Nominated	
Artios Awards	2016	TV Movie or Mini-Series	Robert J. Ulrich, Eric Dawson, Carol Kritzer, Meagan Lewis, Becky Silverman (for American Horror Story: Freak Show)	Nominated	
BET Awards	2014	Best Actress	Angela Bassett	Nominated	
Black Reel Awards	2016	Outstanding Supporting Actress, TV Movie or Limited Series	Angela Bassett	Nominated	
Black Reel Awards	2017	Outstanding Supporting Actress, TV Movie or Limited Series	Angela Bassett	Nominated	
Black Reel Awards	2017	Outstanding Director in a Television Miniseries or Movie	Angela Bassett (for "Chapter 6")	Nominated	
Black Reel Awards	2018	Outstanding Director in a Television Miniseries or Movie	Angela Bassett (for "Drink the Kool-Aid")	Nominated	
BMI Film & TV Awards	2012	Cable Television Music	Charlie Clouser and César Dávila-Irizarry	Won	
BMI Film & TV Awards	2013	Cable Television Music	Charlie Clouser and César Dávila-Irizarry	Won	
BMI Film & TV Awards	2014	Cable Television Music	Charlie Clouser and César Dávila-Irizarry	Won	
BMI Film & TV Awards	2015	Cable Television Music	Charlie Clouser, César Dávila-Irizarry and Mac Quayle	Won	
BMI Film & TV Awards	2017	Cable Television Music	Charlie Clouser, César Dávila-Irizarry and Mac Quayle	Won	
BMI Film & TV Awards	2018	Cable Television Music	Charlie Clouser, César Dávila-Irizarry and Mac Quayle	Won	
BMI Film & TV Awards	2019	Cable Television Music	Charlie Clouser, César Dávila-Irizarry and Mac Quayle	Won	
Bram Stoker Awards	2011	Best Screenplay	Jessica Sharzer (for "Afterbirth")	Won	
Bram Stoker Awards	2012	Best Screenplay	Tim Minear (for "Dark Cousin")	Nominated	
Bram Stoker Awards	2013	Best Screenplay	Brad Falchuk (for "Spilt Milk")	Nominated	
Bram Stoker Awards	2014	Best Screenplay	James Wong (for "The Magical Delights of Stevie Nicks")	Nominated	
Cinema Audio Society Awards	2013	Outstanding Achievement in Sound Mixing – TV Movie or Mini-Series	Sean Rush, Joe Earle, Doug Andham, James S. Levine, Judah Getz, Kyle Billingsley (for "Welcome to Briarcliff")	Nominated	
Cinema Audio Society Awards	2014	Outstanding Achievement in Sound Mixing – TV Movie or Mini-Series	Bruce Litecky, Joe Earle, Doug Andham, James S. Levine, Judah Getz, Kyle Billingsley (for "The Replacements")	Nominated	
Cinema Audio Society Awards	2015	Outstanding Achievement in Sound Mixing – TV Movie or Mini-Series	Bruce Litecky, Joe Earle, Doug Andham, Evan Daum, Kyle Billingsley (for "Monsters Among Us")	Nominated	
Cinema Audio Society Awards	2016	Outstanding Achievement in Sound Mixing – TV Movie or Mini-Series	Brendan Beebe, Joe Earle, Vicki Lemar (for "Room Service")	Nominated	
Cinema Audio Society Awards	2016	Outstanding Achievement in Sound Mixing – TV Movie or Mini-Series	Brendan Beebe, Joe Earle, Doug Andham, Judah Getz, John Guentner (for "Checking In")	Nominated	
Costume Designers Guild Awards	2013	Outstanding Made for Television Movie or Miniseries	Lou Eyrich (for American Horror Story: Asylum)	Won	
Costume Designers Guild Awards	2014	Outstanding Made for Television Movie or Miniseries	Lou Eyrich (for American Horror Story: Coven)	Nominated	
Costume Designers Guild Awards	2015	Outstanding Made for Television Movie or Miniseries	Lou Eyrich (for American Horror Story: Freak Show)	Won	
Costume Designers Guild Awards	2016	Outstanding Contemporary TV Series	Lou Eyrich (for American Horror Story: Hotel)	Won	
Costume Designers Guild Awards	2017	Outstanding Contemporary TV Series	Lou Eyrich, Helen Huang (for American Horror Story: Roanoke)	Won	
Costume Designers Guild Awards	2018	Outstanding Contemporary TV Series	Sarah Evelyn Bram (for American Horror Story: Cult)	Nominated	
Costume Designers Guild Awards	2019	Excellence in Sci-Fi/Fantasy Television	Paula Bradley, Lou Eyrich (for American Horror Story: Apocalypse)	Nominated	
Critics' Choice Television Awards	2012	Best Movie/ Miniseries	American Horror Story	Nominated	
Critics' Choice Television Awards	2012	Best Actress in a Movie/Miniseries	Jessica Lange	Nominated	
Critics' Choice Television Awards	2013	Best Movie/Miniseries	American Horror Story: Asylum	Nominated	
Critics' Choice Television Awards	2013	Best Actress in a Movie/Miniseries	Jessica Lange	Nominated	
Critics' Choice Television Awards	2013	Best Supporting Actor in a Movie/Miniseries	Zachary Quinto	Won	
Critics' Choice Television Awards	2013	Best Supporting Actor in a Movie/Miniseries	James Cromwell	Nominated	
Critics' Choice Television Awards	2013	Best Supporting Actress in a Movie/Miniseries	Sarah Paulson	Won	
Critics' Choice Television Awards	2013	Best Supporting Actress in a Movie/Miniseries	Lily Rabe	Nominated	
Critics' Choice Television Awards	2014	Best Movie/Miniseries	American Horror Story: Coven	Nominated	
Critics' Choice Television Awards	2014	Best Actress in a Movie/Miniseries	Jessica Lange	Won	
Critics' Choice Television Awards	2014	Best Supporting Actress in a Movie/Miniseries	Kathy Bates	Nominated	
Critics' Choice Television Awards	2015	Most Bingeworthy Show	American Horror Story: Freak Show	Nominated	
Critics' Choice Television Awards	2015	Best Actress in a Movie/Miniseries	Jessica Lange	Nominated	
Critics' Choice Television Awards	2015	Best Supporting Actor in a Movie/Miniseries	Finn Wittrock	Nominated	
Critics' Choice Television Awards	2015	Best Supporting Actress in a Movie/Miniseries	Sarah Paulson	Won	
Critics' Choice Television Awards	2016	Best Actor in a Movie/Miniseries	Wes Bentley	Nominated	
Critics' Choice Television Awards	2016	Best Actress in a Movie/Limited Series	Kathy Bates	Nominated	
Critics' Choice Television Awards	2016	Best Supporting Actress in a Movie/Limited Series	Sarah Paulson	Nominated	
Critics' Choice Television Awards	2018	Best Actor in a Movie/Limited Series	Evan Peters	Nominated	
Directors Guild of America Awards	2012	Outstanding Directing – Television Film or Miniseries	Michael Rymer (for "Dark Cousin")	Nominated	
Dorian Awards	2011	TV Performance of the Year	Jessica Lange	Won	
Dorian Awards	2011	TV Drama of the Year	American Horror Story	Won	
Dorian Awards	2011	LGBT-Themed TV Show of the Year	American Horror Story	Nominated	
Dorian Awards	2011	Campy TV Show of the Year	American Horror Story	Nominated	
Dorian Awards	2012	TV Performance of the Year – Actress	Jessica Lange	Won	
Dorian Awards	2012	TV Drama of the Year	American Horror Story: Asylum	Won	
Dorian Awards	2012	LGBT-Themed TV Show of the Year	American Horror Story: Asylum	Nominated	
Dorian Awards	2012	Campy TV Show of the Year	American Horror Story: Asylum	Nominated	
Dorian Awards	2013	TV Performance of the Year – Actress	Jessica Lange	Won	
Dorian Awards	2013	TV Musical Performance of the Year	Jessica Lange and cast (for "The Name Game")	Nominated	
Dorian Awards	2013	TV Drama of the Year	American Horror Story: Coven	Nominated	
Dorian Awards	2013	Campy TV Show of the Year	American Horror Story: Coven	Won	
Dorian Awards	2014	TV Musical Performance of the Year	Jessica Lange (for "Life on Mars?")	Nominated	
Dorian Awards	2014	Campy TV Show of the Year	American Horror Story: Freak Show	Nominated	
Dorian Awards	2015	Campy TV Show of the Year	American Horror Story: Hotel	Nominated	
Dorian Awards	2018	Campy TV Show of the Year	American Horror Story: Apocalypse	Nominated	
Eddie Awards	2014	Best Edited Mini-Series or Motion Picture for TV	Stewart Schill (for "The Name Game")	Nominated	
Fangoria Chainsaw Awards	2015	Best TV Series	American Horror Story: Freak Show	Nominated	
Fangoria Chainsaw Awards	2015	Best TV Actress	Sarah Paulson	Won	
Fangoria Chainsaw Awards	2015	Best TV Supporting Actor	Finn Wittrock	Nominated	
Fangoria Chainsaw Awards	2016	Best TV Actress	Lady Gaga	Nominated	
Fangoria Chainsaw Awards	2016	Best TV Supporting Actor	Evan Peters	Nominated	
Fangoria Chainsaw Awards	2016	Best TV Makeup/Creature FX	Eryn Krueger Mekash, David LeRoy Anderson	Nominated	
Fangoria Chainsaw Awards	2017	Best TV Supporting Actress	Sarah Paulson	Nominated	
Fangoria Chainsaw Awards	2017	Best TV SFX	Eryn Krueger Mekash and David LeRoy Anderson	Nominated	
Fangoria Chainsaw Awards	2019	Best TV Series	American Horror Story: Apocalypse	Nominated	
GLAAD Media Awards	2013	Outstanding TV Movie or Mini-Series	American Horror Story: Asylum	Won	
GLAAD Media Awards	2017	Outstanding TV Movie or Mini-Series	American Horror Story: Cult	Nominated	
GLAAD Media Awards	2023	Outstanding Limited or Anthology Series	American Horror Story: NYC	Nominated	
Golden Globe Awards	2012	Best Television Series – Drama	American Horror Story	Nominated	
Golden Globe Awards	2012	Best Supporting Actress – Series, Miniseries, or Television Film	Jessica Lange	Won	
Golden Globe Awards	2013	Best Actress – Miniseries or Television Film	Jessica Lange	Nominated	
Golden Globe Awards	2014	Best Miniseries or Television Film	American Horror Story: Coven	Nominated	
Golden Globe Awards	2014	Best Actress – Miniseries or Television Film	Jessica Lange	Nominated	
Golden Globe Awards	2015	Best Actress – Miniseries or Television Film	Jessica Lange	Nominated	
Golden Globe Awards	2015	Best Supporting Actress – Series, Miniseries, or Television Film	Kathy Bates	Nominated	
Golden Globe Awards	2016	Best Miniseries or Television Film	American Horror Story: Hotel	Nominated	
Golden Globe Awards	2016	Best Actress – Miniseries or Television Film	Lady Gaga	Won	
Golden Nymph Awards	2014	Outstanding Miniseries	American Horror Story: Coven	Nominated	
Golden Reel Awards	2013	Best Sound Editing – Short Form Sound Effects and Foley in Television	Gary Megregian, Timothy A. Cleveland, Andrew Spencer Dawson and Noel Vought (for "Welcome to Briarcliff")	Won	
Golden Reel Awards	2014	Best Sound Editing – Short Form Dialogue and ADR in Television	Gary Megregian and Steven Stuhr (for "Bitchcraft")	Nominated	
Golden Reel Awards	2015	Best Sound Editing – Short Form Music in Television	David Klotz (for "Monsters Among Us")	Nominated	
Golden Reel Awards	2016	Best Sound Editing – Short Form Music in Television	David Klotz (for "Checking In")	Nominated	
Golden Reel Awards	2017	Best Sound Editing – Short Form Sound Effects and Foley in Television	Gary Megregian, Noel Vought, Timothy A. Cleveland and Paul J. Diller (for "Chapter 1")	Nominated	
Golden Reel Awards	2019	Best Sound Editing – Episodic Short Form – Music / Musical	David Klotz (for "The End")	Won	
Golden Trailer Awards	2017	Best Graphics (TV Spot/Trailer/Teaser for a Series)	FX Networks and mOcean (for "Anthology")	Won	
Golden Trailer Awards	2017	Most Original (TV Spot/Trailer/Teaser for a Series)	FX Networks and mOcean (for "Anthology")	Won	
Golden Trailer Awards	2017	Best Horror/Thriller TV Series Poster	FX Networks and The Refinery (for "Beetle")	Nominated	
Golden Trailer Awards	2018	Best Horror/Thriller TV Series Poster	FX Networks and BOND (for "One Sheet")	Won	
Guild of Music Supervisors Awards	2013	Best Music Supervision in a Television Drama	P.J. Bloom	Nominated	
Guild of Music Supervisors Awards	2014	Best Music Supervision in a Television Drama	P.J. Bloom	Nominated	
Guild of Music Supervisors Awards	2015	Best Music Supervision in a Television Drama	P.J. Bloom	Nominated	
Guild of Music Supervisors Awards	2017	Best Music Supervision in a Television Limited Series or Movie	P.J. Bloom	Nominated	
Hollywood Post Alliance Awards	2013	Outstanding Editing – Television	Joe Leonard and Bradley Buecker (for "Welcome to Briarcliff")	Nominated	
ICG Publicists Awards	2014	Maxwell Weinberg Campaign Award – TV	Matthew Mitchell (for American Horror Story: Coven)	Won	
Jupiter Awards	2016	Best International TV Series	American Horror Story: Hotel	Won	
Kerrang! Awards	2012	Best TV Show	American Horror Story: Murder House	Nominated	
Make-Up Artists and Hair Stylists Guild Awards	2014	Mini-Series or TV Movie Period and/or Character Make-up	Eryn Krueger Mekash, Christien Tinsley (for American Horror Story: Coven)	Nominated	
Make-Up Artists and Hair Stylists Guild Awards	2014	Mini-Series or TV Movie Period and/or Character Hair Styling	Monte C. Haught (for American Horror Story: Coven)	Nominated	
Make-Up Artists and Hair Stylists Guild Awards	2015	Mini-Series or TV Movie Period and/or Character Make-up	Eryn Krueger Mekash, Kim Ayers (for American Horror Story: Freak Show)	Won	
Make-Up Artists and Hair Stylists Guild Awards	2015	Mini-Series or TV Movie Period and/or Character Hair Styling	Monte C. Haught, Michelle Ceglia (for American Horror Story: Freak Show)	Won	
Make-Up Artists and Hair Stylists Guild Awards	2015	Mini-Series or TV Movie Period Special Make-up Effects	Eryn Krueger Mekash, Michael Mekash, Christopher Nelson (for American Horror Story: Freak Show)	Won	
Make-Up Artists and Hair Stylists Guild Awards	2016	Mini-Series or TV Movie Period and/or Character Make-up	Eryn Krueger Mekash, Kim Ayers, Sarah Tanno (for American Horror Story: Hotel)	Won	
Make-Up Artists and Hair Stylists Guild Awards	2016	Mini-Series or TV Movie Period and/or Character Hair Styling	Monte C Haught, Darlene Brumfield, Frederic Asperas (for American Horror Story: Hotel)	Won	
Make-Up Artists and Hair Stylists Guild Awards	2016	Mini-Series or TV Movie Period Special Make-up Effects	Eryn Krueger Mekash, Michael Mekash, David Anderson (for American Horror Story: Hotel)	Won	
Make-Up Artists and Hair Stylists Guild Awards	2016	Commercials and Music Videos – Best Make-up	Kerry Herta, Jason Collins (for American Horror Story: Hotel)	Won	
Make-Up Artists and Hair Stylists Guild Awards	2016	Commercials and Music Videos – Best Hair Styling	Nicole Alkire, Marissa Smith (for American Horror Story: Hotel)	Won	
Make-Up Artists and Hair Stylists Guild Awards	2017	TV Mini Series or Movie Made for Television – Best Contemporary Hair Styling	Michelle Ceglia, Valerie Jackson (for American Horror Story: Roanoke)	Won	
Make-Up Artists and Hair Stylists Guild Awards	2017	TV Mini Series or Movie Made for Television – Best Period/Character Make-up	Eryn Krueger Mekash, Kim Ayers, Silvina Knight (for American Horror Story: Roanoke)	Nominated	
Make-Up Artists and Hair Stylists Guild Awards	2017	TV Mini Series or Movie Made for Television – Best Period/Character Hair Styling	Michelle Ceglia, Valerie Jackson (for American Horror Story: Roanoke)	Nominated	
Make-Up Artists and Hair Stylists Guild Awards	2017	TV Mini Series or Movie Made for Television – Best Special Make-up Effects	Eryn Krueger Mekash, Michael Mekash, David Anderson (for American Horror Story: Roanoke)	Won	
Make-Up Artists and Hair Stylists Guild Awards	2017	Commercials & Music Videos – Best Make-Up	Kerry Herta, Jason Collins, Cristina Waltz (for American Horror Story: Roanoke Promo)	Won	
Make-Up Artists and Hair Stylists Guild Awards	2018	TV Miniseries Or Movie Made For TV: Best Contemporary Makeup	Eryn Krueger Mekash, Kim Ayers, Silvina Knight (for American Horror Story: Cult)	Nominated	
Make-Up Artists and Hair Stylists Guild Awards	2018	TV Miniseries or Movie Made For TV Best Contemporary Hair Styling	Michelle Ceglia, Samantha Wade, Brittany Madrigal (for American Horror Story: Cult)	Nominated	
Make-Up Artists and Hair Stylists Guild Awards	2018	TV Miniseries Or Movie Made For TV: Best Period and/or Character Hair Styling	Michelle Ceglia, Samantha Wade, Julie Rael (for American Horror Story: Cult)	Nominated	
Make-Up Artists and Hair Stylists Guild Awards	2018	TV Miniseries Or Movie Made For TV: Best Special Makeup Effects	Eryn Krueger Mekash, Michael Mekash, David Anderson (for American Horror Story: Cult)	Won	
Make-Up Artists and Hair Stylists Guild Awards	2018	Commercials and Music Videos: Best Makeup	Kerry Herta, Jason Collins, Christina Waltz (for American Horror Story: Cult)	Won	
Make-Up Artists and Hair Stylists Guild Awards	2018	Commercials and Music Videos: Best Hair Styling	Nicki Alkire, Fernando Navarro, Stephanie Rives (for American Horror Story: Cult)	Won	
Make-Up Artists and Hair Stylists Guild Awards	2019	TV Miniseries Or Movie Made For TV: Best Contemporary Makeup	Eryn Krueger Mekash, Kim Ayers, Silvina Knight (for American Horror Story: Apocalypse)	Won	
Make-Up Artists and Hair Stylists Guild Awards	2019	TV Miniseries or Movie Made For TV Best Contemporary Hair Styling	Michelle Ceglia, Helena Cepeda, Romaine Markus-Meyers (for American Horror Story: Apocalypse)	Nominated	
Make-Up Artists and Hair Stylists Guild Awards	2019	TV Miniseries Or Movie Made For TV: Best Period and/or Character Hair Styling	Michelle Ceglia, Helena Cepeda, Lydia Fantini (for American Horror Story: Apocalypse)	Nominated	
Make-Up Artists and Hair Stylists Guild Awards	2019	TV Miniseries Or Movie Made For TV: Best Special Makeup Effects	Eryn Krueger Mekash, Mike Mekash, David Anderson (for American Horror Story: Apocalypse)	Nominated	
Make-Up Artists and Hair Stylists Guild Awards	2019	Commercials and Music Videos: Best Makeup	Kerry Herta, Jason Collins, Cristina Waltz (for American Horror Story: Apocalypse)	Won	
Make-Up Artists and Hair Stylists Guild Awards	2019	Commercials and Music Videos: Best Hair Styling	Joe Matke, Fernando Santaella-Navarro (for American Horror Story: Apocalypse)	Won	
Make-Up Artists and Hair Stylists Guild Awards	2022	Commercials and Music Videos: Best Makeup	Kerry Herta, Christina Kortum, Alex Perrone (for American Horror Story: Double Feature)	Won	
Make-Up Artists and Hair Stylists Guild Awards	2024	Commercials & Music Videos – Best Makeup	American Horror Story: Delicate	Won	
Make-Up Artists and Hair Stylists Guild Awards	2024	Commercials & Music Videos – Best Hair Styling	American Horror Story: Delicate	Won	
MTV Fandom Awards	2015	Feels Freakout of the Year	Lady Gaga joins American Horror Story: Hotel	Nominated	
MTV Movie & TV Awards	2017	Best Villain	Wes Bentley	Nominated	
NAACP Image Awards	2014	Outstanding Actress in a Television Movie, Mini-Series or Dramatic Special	Angela Bassett	Nominated	
NAACP Image Awards	2014	Outstanding Actress in a Television Movie, Mini-Series or Dramatic Special	Gabourey Sidibe	Nominated	
NAACP Image Awards	2015	Outstanding Television Movie, Mini-Series or Dramatic Special	American Horror Story: Freak Show	Nominated	
NAACP Image Awards	2015	Outstanding Actress in a Television Movie, Mini-Series or Dramatic Special	Angela Bassett	Nominated	
NAACP Image Awards	2016	Outstanding Actress in a Television Movie, Mini-Series or Dramatic Special	Angela Bassett	Nominated	
NewNowNext Awards	2012	Cause You're Hot	Jessica Lange	Nominated	
NewNowNext Awards	2013	Coolest Cameo	Adam Levine (for American Horror Story: Asylum)	Nominated	
People's Choice Awards	2014	Favorite TV Movie/Miniseries	American Horror Story: Coven	Won	
People's Choice Awards	2015	Favorite Cable Sci-Fi/Fantasy TV Show	American Horror Story: Freak Show	Nominated	
People's Choice Awards	2015	Favorite Sci-Fi/Fantasy TV Actress	Jessica Lange	Nominated	
People's Choice Awards	2016	Favorite Cable Sci-Fi/Fantasy TV Show	American Horror Story: Hotel	Nominated	
People's Choice Awards	2016	Favorite Sci-Fi/Fantasy TV Actress	Lady Gaga	Nominated	
People's Choice Awards	2017	Favorite Cable Sci-Fi/Fantasy TV Show	American Horror Story: Roanoke	Nominated	
People's Choice Awards	2024	Sci-Fi/Fantasy Show of the Year	American Horror Story: Delicate	Nominated	
Poppy Awards	2016	Best Limited Series/Movie	American Horror Story: Hotel	Won	
Poppy Awards	2016	Best Lead Actress, Limited Series/Movie	Lady Gaga	Won	
Poppy Awards	2016	Best Supporting Actor, Limited Series/Movie	Denis O'Hare	Nominated	
Primetime Emmy Awards	2012	Outstanding Miniseries or Movie	American Horror Story	Nominated	
Primetime Emmy Awards	2012	Outstanding Lead Actress in a Miniseries or Movie	Connie Britton	Nominated	
Primetime Emmy Awards	2012	Outstanding Supporting Actor in a Miniseries or Movie	Denis O'Hare	Nominated	
Primetime Emmy Awards	2012	Outstanding Supporting Actress in a Miniseries or Movie	Jessica Lange	Won	
Primetime Emmy Awards	2012	Outstanding Supporting Actress in a Miniseries or Movie	Frances Conroy	Nominated	
Primetime Emmy Awards	2013	Outstanding Miniseries or Movie	American Horror Story: Asylum	Nominated	
Primetime Emmy Awards	2013	Outstanding Lead Actress in a Miniseries or Movie	Jessica Lange	Nominated	
Primetime Emmy Awards	2013	Outstanding Supporting Actor in a Miniseries or Movie	James Cromwell	Won	
Primetime Emmy Awards	2013	Outstanding Supporting Actor in a Miniseries or Movie	Zachary Quinto	Nominated	
Primetime Emmy Awards	2013	Outstanding Supporting Actress in a Miniseries or Movie	Sarah Paulson	Nominated	
Primetime Emmy Awards	2014	Outstanding Miniseries	American Horror Story: Coven	Nominated	
Primetime Emmy Awards	2014	Outstanding Lead Actress in a Miniseries or Movie	Jessica Lange	Won	
Primetime Emmy Awards	2014	Outstanding Lead Actress in a Miniseries or Movie	Sarah Paulson	Nominated	
Primetime Emmy Awards	2014	Outstanding Supporting Actress in a Miniseries or Movie	Frances Conroy	Nominated	
Primetime Emmy Awards	2014	Outstanding Supporting Actress in a Miniseries or Movie	Kathy Bates	Won	
Primetime Emmy Awards	2014	Outstanding Supporting Actress in a Miniseries or Movie	Angela Bassett	Nominated	
Primetime Emmy Awards	2014	Outstanding Writing for a Miniseries, Movie, or Dramatic Special	Ryan Murphy and Brad Falchuk (for "Bitchcraft")	Nominated	
Primetime Emmy Awards	2014	Outstanding Directing for a Miniseries, Movie, or Dramatic Special	Alfonso Gomez-Rejon (for "Bitchcraft")	Nominated	
Primetime Emmy Awards	2015	Outstanding Limited Series	American Horror Story: Freak Show	Nominated	
Primetime Emmy Awards	2015	Outstanding Lead Actress in a Limited Series or Movie	Jessica Lange	Nominated	
Primetime Emmy Awards	2015	Outstanding Supporting Actor in a Limited Series or Movie	Denis O'Hare	Nominated	
Primetime Emmy Awards	2015	Outstanding Supporting Actor in a Limited Series or Movie	Finn Wittrock	Nominated	
Primetime Emmy Awards	2015	Outstanding Supporting Actress in a Limited Series or Movie	Sarah Paulson	Nominated	
Primetime Emmy Awards	2015	Outstanding Supporting Actress in a Limited Series or Movie	Angela Bassett	Nominated	
Primetime Emmy Awards	2015	Outstanding Supporting Actress in a Limited Series or Movie	Kathy Bates	Nominated	
Primetime Emmy Awards	2015	Outstanding Directing For a Limited Series, Movie Or a Dramatic Special	Ryan Murphy (for "Monsters Among Us")	Nominated	
Primetime Emmy Awards	2016	Outstanding Supporting Actress in a Limited Series or Movie	Sarah Paulson	Nominated	
Primetime Emmy Awards	2016	Outstanding Supporting Actress in a Limited Series or Movie	Kathy Bates	Nominated	
Primetime Emmy Awards	2018	Outstanding Lead Actress in a Limited Series or Movie	Sarah Paulson	Nominated	
Primetime Emmy Awards	2018	Outstanding Supporting Actress in a Limited Series or Movie	Adina Porter	Nominated	
Primetime Creative Arts Emmy Awards	2012	Outstanding Art Direction for a Miniseries or Movie	Mark Worthington, Edward L. Rubin and Ellen Brill (for "Open House")	Nominated	
Primetime Creative Arts Emmy Awards	2012	Outstanding Art Direction for a Miniseries or Movie	Beth Rubino, Charles M. Lagola and Ellen Brill (for "Pilot")	Nominated	
Primetime Creative Arts Emmy Awards	2012	Outstanding Casting for a Miniseries, Movie, or Special	Robert Ulrich and Eric Dawson (for American Horror Story)	Nominated	
Primetime Creative Arts Emmy Awards	2012	Outstanding Costumes for a Miniseries, Movie, or Special	Chrisi Karvonides and Conan Castro (for "Halloween")	Nominated	
Primetime Creative Arts Emmy Awards	2012	Outstanding Single-Camera Picture Editing for a Miniseries or Movie	Fabienne Bouville (for "Birth")	Nominated	
Primetime Creative Arts Emmy Awards	2012	Outstanding Hairstyling for a Miniseries or Movie	Monte C. Haught, Samantha Wade, Melanie Verkins, Natalie Driscoll and Michelle Ceglia (for American Horror Story)	Won	
Primetime Creative Arts Emmy Awards	2012	Outstanding Main Title Design	Kyle WJ Cooper, Juan Ruiz Anchia, Gabriel Diaz and Ryan Murphy (for American Horror Story)	Nominated	
Primetime Creative Arts Emmy Awards	2012	Outstanding Makeup for a Miniseries or a Movie (Non-Prosthetic)	Eryn Krueger Mekash, Kim Ayers, Silvina Knight and D. Garen Tolkin (for American Horror Story)	Nominated	
Primetime Creative Arts Emmy Awards	2012	Outstanding Prosthetic Makeup for a Series, Miniseries, Movie, or Special	Eryn Krueger Mekash, Hiroshi Yada, Michael Mekash, Christopher Nelson, Kim Ayers, Christien Tinsley and Jason Hamer (for American Horror Story)	Nominated	
Primetime Creative Arts Emmy Awards	2012	Outstanding Sound Editing for a Miniseries, Movie, or Special	Gary Megregian, David Klotz, Steve M. Stuhr, Jason Krane, Jason Lezama, Timothy Cleveland, Bruce Tanis, Simon Coke, Zane Bruce, Jeff Gunn and Lance Wiseman (for "Piggy Piggy")	Nominated	
Primetime Creative Arts Emmy Awards	2012	Outstanding Sound Mixing for a Miniseries or Movie	Sean Rush, Joe Earle and Doug Andham (for "Piggy Piggy")	Nominated	
Primetime Creative Arts Emmy Awards	2012	Outstanding Stunt Coordination	Tim Davison (for American Horror Story)	Nominated	
Primetime Creative Arts Emmy Awards	2013	Outstanding Cinematography for a Miniseries Or Movie	Michael Goi (for "I Am Anne Frank, Part 2")	Nominated	
Primetime Creative Arts Emmy Awards	2013	Outstanding Art Direction for a Miniseries or Movie	Mark Worthington, Andrew Murdock and Ellen Brill (for "I Am Anne Frank, Part 2")	Nominated	
Primetime Creative Arts Emmy Awards	2013	Outstanding Art Direction for a Miniseries or Movie	Mark Worthington, Edward L. Rubin and Ellen Brill (for "Welcome to Briarcliff")	Nominated	
Primetime Creative Arts Emmy Awards	2013	Outstanding Casting for a Miniseries, Movie, or Special	Robert Ulrich and Eric Dawson (for American Horror Story: Asylum)	Nominated	
Primetime Creative Arts Emmy Awards	2013	Outstanding Costumes for a Miniseries, Movie, or Special	Chrisi Karvonides and Conan Castro (for "Madness Ends")	Nominated	
Primetime Creative Arts Emmy Awards	2013	Outstanding Single-Camera Picture Editing for a Miniseries or Movie	Fabienne Bouville (for "Nor'easter")	Nominated	
Primetime Creative Arts Emmy Awards	2013	Outstanding Hairstyling for a Miniseries or Movie	Monte C. Haught, Janis Clark, Stacey K. Black, Natalie Driscoll and Michelle Ceglia (for American Horror Story: Asylum)	Nominated	
Primetime Creative Arts Emmy Awards	2013	Outstanding Main Title Design	Kyle WJ Cooper, Juan Ruiz Anchia, Kate Berry and Ryan Murphy (for American Horror Story: Asylum)	Nominated	
Primetime Creative Arts Emmy Awards	2013	Outstanding Makeup for a Miniseries or Movie	Eryn Krueger Mekash, Kim Ayers, Silvina Knight and John Elliot (for American Horror Story: Asylum)	Nominated	
Primetime Creative Arts Emmy Awards	2013	Outstanding Prosthetic Makeup for a Series, Miniseries, Movie, or Special (Non-Prosthetic)	Eryn Krueger Mekash, Mike Mekash, Hiroshi Yada, Christopher Nelson, Kim Ayers, Silvina Knight, Christien Tinsley and Jason Hamer (for American Horror Story: Asylum)	Nominated	
Primetime Creative Arts Emmy Awards	2013	Outstanding Sound Editing for a Miniseries, Movie, or Special	Gary Megregian, Steve M. Stuhr, Jason Krane, Christian Buenaventura, Timothy A. Cleveland, David Klotz, Andrew Dawson and Noel Vought (for "Welcome to Briarcliff")	Won	
Primetime Creative Arts Emmy Awards	2013	Outstanding Sound Mixing for a Miniseries or Movie	Sean Rush, Joe Earle and Doug Andham (for "Welcome to Briarcliff")	Nominated	
Primetime Creative Arts Emmy Awards	2014	Outstanding Art Direction for a Period Series, Miniseries or a Movie (Single-Camera)	Mark Worthington, Andrew Murdock and Ellen Brill (for American Horror Story: Coven)	Nominated	
Primetime Creative Arts Emmy Awards	2014	Outstanding Casting for a Miniseries, Movie, or Special	Robert Ulrich, Eric Dawson and Meagan Lewis (for American Horror Story: Coven)	Nominated	
Primetime Creative Arts Emmy Awards	2014	Outstanding Costumes for a Miniseries, Movie, or Special	Lou Eyrich, Elizabeth Macey and Ken Van Duyne (for "Bitchcraft")	Won	
Primetime Creative Arts Emmy Awards	2014	Outstanding Hairstyling for a Miniseries or Movie	Monte C. Haught, Michelle Ceglia, Yolanda Mercadel and Daina Daigle (for American Horror Story: Coven)	Won	
Primetime Creative Arts Emmy Awards	2014	Outstanding Makeup for a Miniseries or Movie (Non-Prosthetic)	Eryn Krueger Mekash, Kim Ayers, Vicki Vacca, Mike Mekash, Christopher Nelson and Lucy O'Reilly (for American Horror Story: Coven)	Nominated	
Primetime Creative Arts Emmy Awards	2014	Outstanding Prosthetic Makeup for a Series, Miniseries, Movie, or Special	Eryn Krueger Mekash, Mike Mekash, Christien Tinsley, Jason Hamer, Christopher Nelson, David L. Anderson, Cristina Patterson and Rob Freitas (for American Horror Story: Coven)	Nominated	
Primetime Creative Arts Emmy Awards	2014	Outstanding Music Composition for a Miniseries, Movie or a Special	James S. Levine (for "The Seven Wonders")	Nominated	
Primetime Creative Arts Emmy Awards	2014	Outstanding Sound Editing for a Miniseries, Movie, or Special	Gary Megregian, David Klotz, Timothy A. Cleveland, Paul Diller, Brian Thomas Nist, Steve M. Stuhr, Lance Wiseman and Noel Vought (for "Fearful Pranks Ensue")	Nominated	
Primetime Creative Arts Emmy Awards	2014	Outstanding Sound Mixing for a Miniseries or Movie	Bruce Litecky, Joe Earle and Doug Andham (for "Fearful Pranks Ensue")	Nominated	
Primetime Creative Arts Emmy Awards	2015	Outstanding Hairstyling For a Limited Series Or a Movie	Monte C. Haught, Michelle Cegila, Daina Daigle, Amy Wood and Sherri B. Hamilton (for American Horror Story: Freak Show)	Won	
Primetime Creative Arts Emmy Awards	2015	Outstanding Main Title Design	Ryan Murphy, Kyle Cooper, Lee Nelson and Nadia Tzou (for American Horror Story: Freak Show)	Nominated	
Primetime Creative Arts Emmy Awards	2015	Outstanding Special Visual Effects in a Supporting Role	Jason Piccioni, Justin Ball, Jason Spratt, Tim Jacobsen, David Altenau, Tommy Tran, Mike Kirylo, Matt Lefferts and Donnie Dean (for "Edward Mordrake, Part 2")	Won	
Primetime Creative Arts Emmy Awards	2015	Outstanding Costumes for a Period/Fantasy Series, Limited Series, or Movie	Lou Eyrich, Elizabeth Macey and Ken van Duyne (for "Monsters Among Us")	Won	
Primetime Creative Arts Emmy Awards	2015	Outstanding Sound Mixing For a Limited Series or a Movie	Bruce Litecky, Joe Earle, Doug Andham and Evan Daum (for "Magical Thinking")	Nominated	
Primetime Creative Arts Emmy Awards	2015	Outstanding Cinematography For a Limited Series or Movie	Michael Goi (for "Monsters Among Us")	Nominated	
Primetime Creative Arts Emmy Awards	2015	Outstanding Sound Editing For a Limited Series, Movie, or Special	Gary Megregian, Timothy A. Cleveland, Paul Diller, Steve M. Stuhr, Lance Wiseman, Jason Krane, John Green, David Klotz and Noel Vought (for "Curtain Call")	Nominated	
Primetime Creative Arts Emmy Awards	2015	Outstanding Casting For a Limited Series, Movie, or Special	Robert J. Ulrich, Eric Dawson and Meagan Lewis (for American Horror Story: Freak Show)	Nominated	
Primetime Creative Arts Emmy Awards	2015	Outstanding Prosthetic Makeup For a Series, Limited Series, Movie, or Special	Eryn Krueger Mekash, Michael Mekash, David L. Anderson, Justin Raleigh, Christopher Nelson, Kim Ayers, Luis Garcia and James MacKinnon (for American Horror Story: Freak Show)	Won	
Primetime Creative Arts Emmy Awards	2015	Outstanding Music Composition For a Limited Series, Movie Or a Special (Original Dramatic Score)	Mac Quayle (for "Orphans")	Nominated	
Primetime Creative Arts Emmy Awards	2015	Outstanding Make-up for a Limited Series or Movie (Non-Prosthetic)	Eryn Krueger Mekash, Kim Ayers, Lucy O'Reilly, Michael Mekash, Christopher Nelson and Jillian Erickson (for American Horror Story: Freak Show)	Won	
Primetime Creative Arts Emmy Awards	2016	Outstanding Production Design for a Narrative Contemporary or Fantasy Program (One Hour or More)	Mark Worthington, Denise Hudson, Ellen Brill (for American Horror Story: Hotel)	Nominated	
Primetime Creative Arts Emmy Awards	2016	Outstanding Costumes for a Contemporary Series, Limited Series or Movie	Lou Eyrich, Helen Huang, Marisa Aboitiz (for "Chutes and Ladders")	Won	
Primetime Creative Arts Emmy Awards	2016	Outstanding Hairstyling for a Limited Series or Movie	Monte C. Haught, Fredric Aspiras, Darlene Brumfield, Kelly Muldoon, Gina Bonacquisti (for American Horror Story: Hotel)	Nominated	
Primetime Creative Arts Emmy Awards	2016	Outstanding Sound Editing for a Limited Series, Movie, or Special	Gary Megregian, Steve M. Stuhr, Jason Krane, Timothy A. Cleveland, Paul Diller, David Klotz, Noel Vought, Ginger Geary (for "Checking In")	Nominated	
Primetime Creative Arts Emmy Awards	2016	Outstanding Make-up for a Limited Series or Movie (Non-Prosthetic)	Eryn Krueger Mekash, Kim Ayers, Michael Mekash, Silvina Knight, Sarah Tanno (for American Horror Story: Hotel)	Won	
Primetime Creative Arts Emmy Awards	2016	Outstanding Prosthetic Makeup For a Series, Limited Series, Movie, or Special	Eryn Krueger Mekash, Mike Mekash, Bradley A. Palmer, Bart Mixon, James MacKinnon, Kevin Kirkpatrick, David Leroy Anderson, Glen Eisner (for American Horror Story: Hotel)	Nominated	
Primetime Creative Arts Emmy Awards	2017	Outstanding Hairstyling for a Limited Series or Movie	Michelle Ceglia, Valerie Jackson, Jose Zamora (for American Horror Story: Roanoke)	Nominated	
Primetime Creative Arts Emmy Awards	2017	Outstanding Sound Editing for a Limited Series, Movie, or Special	Gary Megregian, Steve M. Stuhr, Jason Krane, Timothy A. Cleveland, Paul Diller, David Klotz, Noel Vought (for "Chapter 1")	Nominated	
Primetime Creative Arts Emmy Awards	2017	Outstanding Makeup for a Limited Series or Movie (Non-Prosthetic)	Eryn Krueger Mekash, Kim Ayers, Mike Mekash, Silvina Knight, Carleigh Herbert, Luis Garcia (for American Horror Story: Roanoke)	Nominated	
Primetime Creative Arts Emmy Awards	2017	Outstanding Prosthetic Makeup for a Series, Limited Series, Movie or a Special	Eryn Krueger Mekash, Michael Mekash, David Leroy Anderson, James Mackinnon, Jason Hamer, Melanie Eichner, Cristina Himiob, Maiko Chiba (for American Horror Story: Roanoke)	Won	
Primetime Creative Arts Emmy Awards	2018	Outstanding Production Design for a Narrative Contemporary or Fantasy Program (One Hour or More)	Jeff Mossa, Rachel Robb Kondrath, Claire Kaufman (for American Horror Story: Cult)	Nominated	
Primetime Creative Arts Emmy Awards	2018	Outstanding Hairstyling for a Limited Series or Movie	Michelle Ceglia, Samantha Wade, Brittany Madrigal, Julie Rael, Valerie Jackson, Joanne Onorio (for American Horror Story: Cult)	Nominated	
Primetime Creative Arts Emmy Awards	2018	Outstanding Make-up for a Limited Series or Movie (Non-Prosthetic)	Eryn Krueger Mekash, Kim Ayers, Michael Mekash, Silvina Knight, Carleigh Herbert (for American Horror Story: Cult)	Nominated	
Primetime Creative Arts Emmy Awards	2018	Outstanding Prosthetic Makeup For a Series, Limited Series, Movie, or Special	Eryn Krueger Mekash, Michael Mekash, Kim Ayers, Silvina Knight, Christopher Nelson, Carleigh Herbert, Glen Eisner, David Leroy Anderson (for American Horror Story: Cult)	Nominated	
Primetime Creative Arts Emmy Awards	2018	Outstanding Sound Editing for a Limited Series, Movie, or Special	Gary Megregian, Naaman Haynes, Steve M. Stuhr, Timothy A. Cleveland, Paul Diller, Mitchell Lestner, Sam Munoz, David Klotz, Noel Vought (for "Great Again")	Nominated	
Primetime Creative Arts Emmy Awards	2019	Outstanding Guest Actress in a Drama Series	Jessica Lange (for "Return to Murder House")	Nominated	
Primetime Creative Arts Emmy Awards	2019	Outstanding Fantasy/Sci-Fi Costumes	Lou Eyrich, Paula Bradley, Rebecca Guzzi, Charlene Amateau (for "Forbidden Fruit")	Nominated	
Primetime Creative Arts Emmy Awards	2019	Outstanding Hairstyling for a Single-Camera Series	Michelle Ceglia, Helena Cepeda, Lydia Fantani, Romaine Markus-Meyers (for "Forbidden Fruit")	Nominated	
Primetime Creative Arts Emmy Awards	2019	Outstanding Makeup for a Single-Camera Series (Non-Prosthetic)	Eryn Krueger Mekash, Kim Ayers, Michael Mekash, Silvina Knight, Jamie Leigh Devilla (for "Forbidden Fruit")	Nominated	
Primetime Creative Arts Emmy Awards	2019	Outstanding Prosthetic Makeup for a Series, Limited Series, Movie, or Special	Eryn Krueger Mekash, Michael Mekash, Steve LaPorte, Jake Garber, Vance Hartwell, Silvina Knight, Glen Eisner, David Leroy Anderson (for "Apocalypse Then")	Nominated	
Primetime Creative Arts Emmy Awards	2020	Outstanding Period and/or Character Makeup (Non-Prosthetic)	Carleigh Herbert, Abby Clawson, Melissa "Mo" Meinhart, Lawrence Mercado (for "The Lady in White")	Nominated	
Primetime Creative Arts Emmy Awards	2020	Outstanding Prosthetic Makeup for a Series, Limited Series, Movie, or Special	Michael Mekash, Vincent Van Dyke (for "True Killers")	Nominated	
Primetime Creative Arts Emmy Awards	2020	Outstanding Sound Editing for a Limited Series, Movie, or Special	Gary Megregian, Timothy A. Cleveland, Naaman Haynes, Patrick Hogan, Sam Munoz, David Klotz, Noel Vought (for "Camp Redwood")	Nominated	
Primetime Creative Arts Emmy Awards	2020	Outstanding Sound Mixing for a Limited Series or Movie	Alex Altman, Doug Andham, Joe Earle, Judah Getz (for "Camp Redwood")	Nominated	
Primetime Creative Arts Emmy Awards	2022	Outstanding Contemporary Makeup (Non-Prosthetic)	Eryn Krueger Mekash, Kim Ayers, Mike Mekash, Ana Gabriela Quinonez (for "Gaslight")	Nominated	
Primetime Creative Arts Emmy Awards	2022	Outstanding Sound Editing for a Limited or Anthology Series, Movie or Special	Christian Buenaventura, Steve M. Stuhr, David Beadle, Tim Cleveland, Zheng Jia, Samuel Muñoz, Sean McGuire, Noel Vought (for "Gaslight")	Nominated	
Primetime Creative Arts Emmy Awards	2024	Outstanding Contemporary Costumes for a Limited or Anthology Series or Movie	Jacqueline Demeterio, Jessica Zavala, Jennifer Salim, Jose Bantula and Jillian Daidone (for "The Auteur")	Won	
PRISM Awards	2013	Drama Series Multi-Episode Storyline – Substance Use	Episodes: "Nor'easter", "I Am Anne Frank: Part 2", "Dark Cousin"	Won	
Producers Guild of America Awards	2013	Outstanding Producer of Long-Form Television	Brad Buecker, Dante Di Loreto, Brad Falchuk, Ryan Murphy, Chip Vucelich and Alexis Martin Woodall (for American Horror Story)	Nominated	
Producers Guild of America Awards	2014	Outstanding Producer of Long-Form Television	Brad Buecker, Dante Di Loreto, Brad Falchuk, Ryan Murphy, Chip Vucelich and Alexis Martin Woodall (for American Horror Story: Asylum)	Nominated	
Producers Guild of America Awards	2015	Outstanding Producer of Long-Form Television	Brad Buecker, Dante Di Loreto, Brad Falchuk, Joseph Incaprera, Alexis Martin Woodall, Tim Minear, Ryan Murphy, Jennifer Salt, James Wong (for American Horror Story: Coven and American Horror Story: Freak Show)	Nominated	
Producers Guild of America Awards	2016	Outstanding Producer of Long-Form Television	Brad Falchuk, Ryan Murphy, Brad Buecker, Tim Minear, Jennifer Salt, James Wong, Alexis Martin Woodall, Robert M. Williams Jr. (for American Horror Story: Hotel)	Nominated	
Queerties	2023	TV Drama	American Horror Story: NCY	Nominated	
Satellite Awards	2011	Best Genre Series	American Horror Story	Won	
Satellite Awards	2011	Special Achievement Award: Outstanding Performance in a TV Series	Jessica Lange	Won	
Satellite Awards	2012	Best Genre Series	American Horror Story: Asylum	Nominated	
Satellite Awards	2012	Best Supporting Actor – Series, Miniseries, or Television Film	Evan Peters	Nominated	
Satellite Awards	2013	Best Genre Series	American Horror Story: Coven	Nominated	
Satellite Awards	2013	Best Actress – Miniseries or Television Film	Jessica Lange	Nominated	
Satellite Awards	2013	Best Supporting Actress – Series, Miniseries or Television Film	Kathy Bates	Nominated	
Satellite Awards	2014	Best Genre Series	American Horror Story: Freak Show	Nominated	
Satellite Awards	2014	Best Supporting Actress – Series, Miniseries or Television Film	Sarah Paulson	Won	
Satellite Awards	2015	Best Genre Series	American Horror Story: Hotel	Nominated	
Satellite Awards	2015	Best Actress – Television Series Drama	Lady Gaga	Nominated	
Saturn Awards	2012	Best Syndicated/Cable Television Series	American Horror Story	Nominated	
Saturn Awards	2012	Best Actor on Television Series	Dylan McDermott	Nominated	
Saturn Awards	2012	Best Actress on Television Series	Jessica Lange	Nominated	
Saturn Awards	2012	Best Supporting Actress on Television Series	Frances Conroy	Nominated	
Saturn Awards	2012	Best Guest Performer on Television Series	Zachary Quinto	Nominated	
Saturn Awards	2013	Best Syndicated/Cable Television Series	American Horror Story: Asylum	Nominated	
Saturn Awards	2013	Best Actress on Television Series	Sarah Paulson	Nominated	
Saturn Awards	2013	Best Supporting Actress on Television Series	Jessica Lange	Nominated	
Saturn Awards	2014	Best Syndicated/Cable Television Series	American Horror Story: Coven	Nominated	
Saturn Awards	2014	Best Actress on Television Series	Jessica Lange	Nominated	
Saturn Awards	2014	Best Supporting Actress on Television Series	Kathy Bates	Nominated	
Saturn Awards	2014	Best Guest Star on Television Series	Danny Huston	Nominated	
Saturn Awards	2015	Best Syndicated/Cable Television Series Series	American Horror Story: Freak Show	Nominated	
Saturn Awards	2015	Best Actress on Television Series	Jessica Lange	Nominated	
Saturn Awards	2015	Best Guest Star on Television Series	Neil Patrick Harris	Nominated	
Saturn Awards	2016	Best Horror Television Series	American Horror Story: Hotel	Nominated	
Saturn Awards	2017	Best Horror Television Series	American Horror Story: Roanoke	Nominated	
Saturn Awards	2017	Best Actress on Television Series	Sarah Paulson	Nominated	
Saturn Awards	2017	Best Supporting Actress on Television Series	Kathy Bates	Nominated	
Saturn Awards	2017	Best Supporting Actress on Television Series	Adina Porter	Nominated	
Saturn Awards	2017	Best Guest Performance on a Television Series	Leslie Jordan	Nominated	
Saturn Awards	2018	Best Horror Television Series	American Horror Story: Cult	Nominated	
Saturn Awards	2018	Best Actress on Television Series	Sarah Paulson	Nominated	
Saturn Awards	2018	Best Supporting Actor on Television Series	Evan Peters	Nominated	
Saturn Awards	2018	Best Supporting Actress on Television Series	Adina Porter	Nominated	
Saturn Awards	2019	Best Horror Television Series	American Horror Story: Apocalypse	Nominated	
Saturn Awards	2022	Best Horror Television Series	American Horror Story: Double Feature	Nominated	
Saturn Awards	2024	Best Horror Television Series	American Horror Story: Delicate	Nominated	
Screen Actors Guild Awards	2012	Outstanding Performance by a Female Actor in a Drama Series	Jessica Lange	Won	
Screen Actors Guild Awards	2013	Outstanding Performance by a Female Actor in a Drama Series	Jessica Lange	Nominated	
Screen Actors Guild Awards	2014	Outstanding Performance by a Female Actor in a Drama Series	Jessica Lange	Nominated	
Society of Camera Operators Awards	2014	Camera Operator of the Year – Television	James Reid (for American Horror Story: Asylum)	Nominated	
SXSW Film Awards	2015	Excellence in Title Design	Kyle Cooper (for American Horror Story: Freak Show)	Nominated	
TCA Awards	2012	Individual Achievement in Drama	Jessica Lange	Nominated	
TCA Awards	2013	Outstanding Achievement in Movies, Miniseries and Specials	American Horror Story: Asylum	Nominated	
TCA Awards	2014	Outstanding Achievement in Movies, Miniseries and Specials	American Horror Story: Coven	Nominated	
VES Awards	2014	Outstanding Supporting Visual Effects in a Visual Effects-Driven Photoreal/Live Action Broadcast Program	Jason Piccioni, Jason Spratt, Mike Kirylo, Justin Bal, Eric Roberts (for "Edward Mordrake: Part 2")	Won	
VES Awards	2014	Outstanding Compositing in a Photoreal/Live Action Broadcast Program	Tommy Tran, JV Pike, Rob Lutz, Matt Lefferts (for "Edward Mordrake: Part 2")	Nominated	
World Soundtrack Awards	2016	Best TV Composer	Mac Quayle	Nominated	
World Soundtrack Awards	2018	Best TV Composer	Mac Quayle	Nominated	
Writers Guild of America Awards	2016	Long Form – Original	Brad Falchuk, John J. Gray, Todd Kubrak, Crystal Liu, Ned Martel, Tim Minear, Ryan Murphy, Jennifer Salt and James Wong (for American Horror Story: Hotel)	Nominated	
Writers Guild of America Awards	2018	Long Form – Original	Brad Falchuk, John J. Gray, Joshua Green, Todd Kubrak, Crystal Liu, Tim Minear, Ryan Murphy, Adam Penn and James Wong (for American Horror Story: Cult)	Nominated	
Writers Guild of America Awards	2022	Long Form – Original	Manny Coto, Brad Falchuk, Ryan Murphy, Kristen Reidel, Reilly Smith (for American Horror Story: Double Feature)	Nominated	
Young Artist Awards	2014	Best Performance in a TV Series – Guest Starring Young Actor 11–13	Toby Nichols	Nominated	
Young Artist Awards	2015	Best Performance in a TV Series – Guest Starring Young Actor 15–21	Dalton E. Gray	Nominated	
Young Artist Awards	2016	Best Performance in a TV Series – Recurring Young Actor (13 and under)	Thomas Barbusca	Nominated	
