= Chapter 3 (American Horror Story) =

- American Horror Story episode
- Episode no.: Season 6 Episode 3
- Directed by: Jennifer Lynch
- Written by: James Wong
- Production code: 6ATS03
- Original air date: September 28, 2016
- Running time: 42 minutes

Guest appearances
- Lady Gaga as Scathach; Adina Porter as Lee Harris; Charles Malik Whitfield as Mason Harris; Colby French as Police Officer; Leslie Jordan as Cricket Marlowe; John Pyper-Ferguson as Cage

Episode chronology
← Previous "Chapter 2"	Next → "Chapter 4"
- American Horror Story: Roanoke

"Chapter 3" is the third episode of the sixth season of the anthology television series American Horror Story. It aired on September 28, 2016, on the cable network FX. The episode was written by James Wong and directed by Jennifer Lynch, marking the first time the series has had a female director.

== Plot ==
Lee, Shelby, and Matt search with the police and volunteers for Flora. In a nearby farmhouse, they find two dirt-encrusted young boys nursing from the teats of a dead sow. After bringing the police back to the farmhouse, the two boys are taken to the hospital, where they are revealed to be part of the Polk family. The boys only know one word, "Croatoan", and in an interview, Matt and Shelby reveal that the word came to be a warning for the pair of them.

Two days later, Lee starts to accept the possibility that, after all this time, they may not find Flora alive. Back at the house, Mason angrily blames Lee for Flora's disappearance, eventually accusing Lee of hiding her, raising the question that Lee may be hiding Flora somewhere in an attempt to prevent him from changing the custody agreement. As they fight, Mason shoves his ex-wife to the ground and storms out of the house out of frustration. That night, the police discovered that Mason had been killed, whose charred corpse was strapped to a raised wooden hoop.

The next day, Matt realizes that his security camera recorded two events during the night after he and Shelby fell asleep: Lee leaving the house 15 minutes later after Mason left and Lee coming back 4 hours later. He and Shelby speculate as to whether Lee was responsible for Mason's death, causing Lee to be understandably upset. Later, a psychic named Cricket Marlowe interrupts them and claims to be able to locate Flora, and Lee pays him $25,000. Although the family is skeptical, they allow Cricket to perform a seance to contact Priscilla.

The next day, she pays Cricket's fee, and he explains that Priscilla is a ghost from the 1500s and that Flora was abducted by the ghost of Thomasin White, wife of John White, the governor of the Roanoke Colony. She was left in charge of the colony after White returned to England for supplies but was later deposed and exiled after the colonists rebelled against Thomasin in her husband's absence. While dying of hunger in the woods, Thomasin was saved by an English witch, Scathach, who gave her soul and swore loyalty to her. After re-establishing her control of Roanoke, Thomasin moved the colony inland to the area where Matt and Shelby's house now stands.

Cricket leads the Millers back into the woods, where they tell Thomasin, that in exchange for returning Flora, the Millers will burn their house down and leave the land for good. Shelby balks at the idea and looks to Matt, but he has disappeared. She finds him having sex with Scathach while the Polks watch. Matt has no memory of the incident when he returns to the house, and Shelby is furious with him. When Lee finds her way back to the house, she is arrested by the police.

== Reception ==
"Chapter 3" was watched by 3.07 million people during its original broadcast, and gained a 1.7 ratings share among adults aged 18–49.

The episode earned a 93% approval rating on Rotten Tomatoes, based on 14 reviews with an average score of 6.6/10. The critical consensus reads, ""Chapter 3" ratchets up the action by finally exploring the hauntings of the Roanoke house and introducing a potential villain in gory AHS style."
