= Nelson Cragg =

American Director and cinematographer

- Born: April 7, 1978 (age 48); Fairfax, Virginia
- Education: University of Southern California
- Occupations: Cinematographer; director; producer
- Years active: 2002–present
- Spouse: Ashley Lynn Mills Cragg

Nelson Cragg (born April 7, 1978) is an American director and producer.

He is known for his work on the Amazon Prime limited series Them, on which he served as executive producer and director of the pilot episode and the bulk of the series. He also worked on Showtime's Homeland and the FX mini-series The People vs. O. J. Simpson, both of which earned him Emmy Award nominations. His other directing credits include multiple shows for producer Ryan Murphy, including The Assassination of Gianni Versace: American Crime Story, American Horror Story, Pose, and Ratched.

== Life and career ==
Cragg is of Korean American descent and was born on April 4, 1978, in Fairfax, Virginia. He attended James Madison University, studying English Literature; then University of Southern California, graduating with a MFA in Film Production. He began his career as a director of photography on Battleground: The Art of War, in 2002. He went on to serve in the capacity on such film and series as: Confession, Special, CSI: Crime Scene Investigation, FlashForward, Elementary, Halt and Catch Fire, Breaking Bad, American Crime Story, American Horror Story, Feud, and Pose.

He made his directorial debut with the fifth episode of FX's American Horror Story: Roanoke. He has since directed episodes of The Assassination of Gianni Versace: American Crime Story, Pose, Ratched for Netflix and Them: Covenant for Amazon Studios.
