= Chapter 1 (American Horror Story) =

- American Horror Story episode
- Shelby and Matt Miller entering the farmhouse
- Episode no.: Season 6 Episode 1
- Directed by: Bradley Buecker
- Written by: Ryan Murphy; Brad Falchuk
- Production code: 6ATS01
- Original air date: September 14, 2016
- Running time: 43 minutes

Guest appearances
- Adina Porter as Lee Harris; Charles Malik Whitfield as Noah Davis (portraying Mason Harris); Colby French as Wilson Fisher (portraying Officer Connell); Larry Cedar as Verne Byers (portraying the Auctioneer); Grady Lee Richmond as Winston Craig (portraying Ishmael Polk)

Episode chronology
← Previous "Be Our Guest"	Next → "Chapter 2"
- American Horror Story: Roanoke

"Chapter 1" is the premiere episode of the sixth season of the anthology television series American Horror Story. It aired on September 14, 2016, on the cable network FX. The episode was co-written by creators Ryan Murphy and Brad Falchuk and directed by Bradley Buecker.

== Plot ==
Shelby and Matt Miller sit in an interview for a documentary called My Roanoke Nightmare. Through a combination of dramatic re-enactment and testimonials, the couple reveals that they fled to North Carolina from Los Angeles after they were assaulted as part of a gang initiation that caused Shelby to miscarry their baby and Matt was seriously injured. They bought an abandoned colonial farmhouse, outbidding a hostile trio of local farmers. As they begin restoring the house, they experience several disturbing incidents of what they consider to be community hostility, though Shelby worries about being alone in the house as she sees and hears startling apparitions.

After Shelby is attacked, Matt installs security cameras around the property and has his judgmental sister Lee stay with Shelby. While Matt is away on a business trip, the disturbing incidents continue as Lee witnesses Shelby drinking and angrily blames her for tempting her out of spite that she is barely holding on to her sobriety and would appreciate it if Shelby did not drink alcohol around her. As their heated arguments ensue, the house is surrounded by knives and torch-wielding intruders.

When Lee hears an intruder enter the house, she and Shelby track one of them down into the basement, where they find a television playing a creepy found footage film about a man encountering a creature who has the head of a pig and the body of a man. The power fails, and the two women are trapped in the basement. When the power is restored, the two women find that the mob has strung up wooden dolls and totems across the entire upstairs.

When Matt returns and they show him the video, he thinks it's a fake to intimidate the couple and scare them away. Shelby wants to leave the woods, only to collide with an old woman standing in the road, smashing her windshield. The woman gets up and walks into the woods, vanishing as Shelby pursues on foot. Shelby is lost in the woods, where she is encircled by the mob that broke into her house and a man with his scalp removed from his head, exposing his brain.

== Reception ==
"Chapter 1" was watched by 5.14 million people during its original broadcast, and gained a 2.8 ratings share among adults aged 18–49.

The episode received positive reviews, earning an 81% approval rating on Rotten Tomatoes, based on 16 reviews with an average score of 7.1/10. The consensus reads, "Unlike any AHS installment to date, season six premiere "Chapter 1" manages to surprise still with a unique setup and a new multi-layered look and feel, even if it doesn't get around to revealing much of what's to come." The A.V. Club called the episode "unreliable, but fun". Dan Fienberg of The Hollywood Reporter gave a positive review, writing, "When you're the type of show prone to kicking off a season with the introduction of a hairless mole man with a killer dildo, it's possible that the most provocative thing you can do to start a chapter is eschewing mole men, dildos and, in fact, killing altogether for a full week. The American Horror Story franchise has been and done many things, but it's never offered such a false sense of security, so this subdued start may be the scariest promise of all. It's the most curious I've been about future installments in a long time." Jeff Jensen of Entertainment Weekly also gave a positive review, writing, "The use of mystery to market the season may have been contrived, but at this point, mystery might also be the best thing going for it, too." Ben Travers of IndieWire called the premiere "a promising start with a central mystery as tantalizing as the ads teasing it."
