= Chapter 5 (American Horror Story) =

- American Horror Story episode
- Episode no.: Season 6 Episode 5
- Directed by: Nelson Cragg
- Written by: Akela Cooper
- Production code: 6ATS05
- Original air date: October 12, 2016
- Running time: 40 minutes

Guest appearances
- Frances Conroy as Mama Polk; Adina Porter as Lee Harris; Colby French as Police Officer; Grady Lee Richmond as Ishmael Polk; Henderson Wade as Guinness; Doris Kearns Goodwin as herself

Episode chronology
← Previous "Chapter 4"	Next → "Chapter 6"
- American Horror Story: Roanoke

"Chapter 5" is the fifth episode of the sixth season of the anthology television series American Horror Story. It aired on October 12, 2016, on the cable network FX. The episode was written by Akela Cooper and directed by Nelson Cragg.

== Plot ==
In an interview, historian Doris Kearns Goodwin details the history of suffering at the Roanoke farmhouse through the backstory of one of the owners of the Roanoke House, Edward Philippe Mott, who is the original builder of their home, and his subsequent ownership of the property. Mott used the property as a storage house for his art collection and covert homosexual affairs with one of his slaves, Guinness. During the blood moon, he was sacrificed by Thomasin and her men. Since then, the house has been sold to a succession of owners, all of whom disappeared under mysterious circumstances.

In the present, Thomasin's mob surrounds the house, ready to kill the Millers. As the mob attacks the house, the Millers are rescued by Mott, who leads them to safety before abandoning them in the woods, where they are captured by the Polk family. At the Polk home, Mama Polk explains that in exchange for providing a sacrifice to the mob on every blood moon, the Polk family earns protection from suffering the same fate. The Polks are still upset about the loss of their two grandsons and plan to hand the Millers back to Thomasin in retribution. Matt takes the opportunity to escape from the Polks' truck, killing one of the family members in the process. Mama Polk smashes Shelby's ankle in retaliation with a sledgehammer.

Shelby implicates Lee for Mason's death, but the police release her due to a lack of evidence. After finding out that Flora is alive, Lee begs a police officer to take her back to the house so that she can be reunited with Flora again. The police officer reluctantly agrees, and they head back together. Meanwhile, the surviving Polks deliver the Millers to the mob at the house. Thomasin and her mob drag Flora away to be sacrificed despite Priscilla's protests, but just as the sacrifice is to begin, Ambrose throws himself and his mother into the fire. Edward Philipe Mott appears and frees Shelby and Matt. The Piggy Man tries to attack Flora but is run down by Lee's car. Shelby, Matt, and Flora all jump into Lee's car and flee to safety.

After Shelby gets medical attention, she and Matt decide to head back to Los Angeles to return to a normal life. Shelby closes her testimonial with a mention that nightmares based on her memories of the events continue to haunt her.

== Reception ==
"Chapter 5" was watched by 2.82 million people during its original broadcast, and gained a 1.5 ratings share among adults aged 18–49.

The episode holds an 88% approval rating on Rotten Tomatoes, based on 16 reviews with an average score of 5.8/10. The critical consensus reads, ""Chapter 5" provides a satisfyingly scary conclusion to Roanoke's first story arc – and sets up a quick change of course."
