= Chapter 7 (American Horror Story) =

- American Horror Story episode
- Episode no.: Season 6 Episode 7
- Directed by: Elodie Keene
- Written by: Crystal Liu
- Production code: 6ATS07
- Original air date: October 26, 2016
- Running time: 38 minutes

Guest appearances
- Finn Wittrock as Jether Polk; Adina Porter as Lee Harris; Robin Weigert as Mama Polk

Episode chronology
← Previous "Chapter 6"	Next → "Chapter 8"
- American Horror Story: Roanoke

"Chapter 7" is the seventh episode of the sixth season of the anthology television series American Horror Story. It aired on October 26, 2016, on the cable network FX. The episode was written by Crystal Liu and directed by Elodie Keene.

== Plot ==
In the production trailer, Agnes arrives on set, in character as Thomasin, and murders producer Sidney Aaron James and his cameraman before she steals the camera.

Inside the house, the actors deny Matt's claim of Rory's fate and find that Rory's body has disappeared from inside the bathroom. The second day before the second night shift of Blood Moon, the tensions break out as Matt, Shelby, and Dominic argue about Shelby's infidelity, and Lee and Monet go back and forth about her alcoholism. Their argument is interrupted when Agnes attacks Shelby inside the bedroom, but Dominic (the actor who played Matt on the original series) stops her. While Audrey, Matt, and Dominic tend to Shelby's wounds, Lee informs the group that all the phone lines have been cut.

She decides to venture outside with Audrey and Monet (who played Lee) to find Sidney's trailer, while Dominic and Matt stay in the house with Shelby. They are confronted by Mott's ghost, obliging the women to flee into the woods, where they meet the real ghosts of the Roanoke colony. After finding Rory's corpse hanging from a tree, Lee, Audrey, and Monet are abducted by the real Polk family and taken into the Polk compound. The deformed family begins to torture the women by force-feeding the actresses' human flesh that they cut from Lee's leg.

Back at the house, Scathach once again manipulates Matt into having sex with her. Shelby drives Scathach away with a crowbar. Matt confesses his affair with the witch as his true reason for returning. Infuriated by his alleged betrayal, Shelby kills Matt by bashing his head with the crowbar. Meanwhile, Agnes lights a fire outside the house to perform the ritual, demanding satisfaction from the occupants of it. Just then, the real Thomasin White and her ghostly mob surround Agnes. Ignoring her patronizing pleas of adoration, Thomasin kills Agnes by cleaving Agnes' head without saying anything.

== Reception ==
"Chapter 7" was watched by 2.62 million people during its original broadcast, and gained a 1.4 ratings share among adults aged 18–49.

The episode received critical acclaim, earning a 100% approval rating on Rotten Tomatoes, based on 14 reviews with an average score of 8.7/10. The critical consensus reads, "The thrilling "Chapter 7" boasts heightened scares, an increased gore quotient, and multiple intriguing storylines."
