= Chapter 4 (American Horror Story) =

- American Horror Story episode
- Episode no.: Season 6 Episode 4
- Directed by: Marita Grabiak
- Written by: John J. Gray
- Production code: 6ATS04
- Original air date: October 5, 2016
- Running time: 39 minutes

Guest appearances
- Lady Gaga as Scathach; Adina Porter as Lee Harris; Leslie Jordan as Cricket Marlowe

Episode chronology
← Previous "Chapter 3"	Next → "Chapter 5"
- American Horror Story: Roanoke

"Chapter 4" is the fourth episode of the sixth season of the anthology television series American Horror Story. It aired on October 5, 2016, on the cable network FX. The episode was written by John J. Gray and directed by Marita Grabiak.

== Plot ==
Following Matt's affair with Scathach, Shelby thinks that Matt and Lee are conspiring against her and his secret deal to leave and destroy the house. Later that night, Shelby is attacked by a man with the head of a pig. She is saved by Dr. Elias Cunningham, who explains that he has been the house's guardian for years. Cunningham leads the Millers to where Priscilla is keeping Flora as a hostage. Cunningham tries to plead with Priscilla to release Flora and he is bristling with arrows, shot by Thomasin's men.

The Millers flee back to the house, where Cricket is waiting for them. Cricket detects that Flora is still alive but does not appreciate that they reneged on the deal with Thomasin and decides to head back into the woods, where he encounters Scathach, who is revealed to be the true leader of the Roanoke Colony. Cricket recognizes her growing power, so he offers Matt's sexual favors to her as a negotiating tactic in exchange for information about Roanoke. Upon accepting, Scathach transported him into her memories of the Lost Colony, a community whose bounty is directly derived from the practice of human sacrifice. Thomasin's son, Ambrose, objected to the sacrifices and rebelled against his mother's rule. Thomasin killed the entire colony, thus binding them to the land for the rest of eternity.

After realizing the truth, Cricket relays the history to the Millers and takes an Uber back to his hotel room to prepare for the battle that night. However, the driver's car nearly collides with Flora, running across the road. Hours later, when the Millers await Cricket's return, Scáthach awaits him there to demand the payment that is owed to her. Under her seduction, Matt learns of Scáthach's history where she was an English woman who crossed centuries before. She became a new immortal witch and a practitioner of Old Magic.

Shelby awakens to find Matt missing and goes outside, where she is confronted by Thomasin and her torch-bearing mob. She yells out for Matt and he comes running to her side, leaving Scáthach behind. Thomasin has found Flora and is about to sacrifice her in front of the Millers, but with Priscilla's help, she can escape and reunite with the Millers. The Millers then flee inside the house and Cricket, as it turned out, chased after Flora and was captured by Thomasin. Thomasin guts him while the Millers watch in horror as Ambrose assists his mother in proceeding to disembowel Cricket.

== Reception ==
Chapter 4 was watched by 2.83 million people during its original broadcast, and gained a 1.4 ratings share among adults aged 18–49.

The episode received a 91% approval rating on Rotten Tomatoes, based on 11 reviews with an average score of 6.9/10. The critical consensus reads, ""Chapter 4" reintroduces some classic American Horror Story chills while providing answers to epic questions and hinting at links to prior seasons."
