= Chapter 8 (American Horror Story) =

- American Horror Story episode
- Episode no.: Season 6 Episode 8
- Directed by: Gwyneth Horder-Payton
- Written by: Todd Kubrak
- Production code: 6ATS08
- Original air date: November 2, 2016
- Running time: 40 minutes

Guest appearances
- Finn Wittrock as Jether Polk; Adina Porter as Lee Harris; Robin Weigert as Mama Polk

Episode chronology
← Previous "Chapter 7"	Next → "Chapter 9"
- American Horror Story: Roanoke

"Chapter 8" is the eighth episode of the sixth season of the anthology television series American Horror Story. It aired on November 2, 2016, on the cable network FX. The episode was written by Todd Kubrak and directed by Gwyneth Horder-Payton.

== Plot ==
Thomasin and the colonists' ghosts begin to surround the house and start their attack. As Shelby and Dominic attempt to escape, Shelby can no longer handle her guilt after murdering Matt and kills herself.

At their family compound, the Polks continue torturing Lee, Audrey, and Monet as retribution for kidnapping their grandchildren. As Mama and her reluctant son, Jether begin to butcher flesh from Lee's leg and Audrey has one of her teeth ripped out, while the matriarch explains how and why the Polks first resorted to cannibalism. Eventually, Audrey and Lee fight back, killing Mama and Jether, and escape back to the farmhouse using the secret passageway, leaving Monet in the wilderness.

Back at the house, the two women come across Matt's body, much to Lee's grief. In the upstairs bedroom, Audrey tries to comfort Lee while nursing her back to health. Audrey finds Shelby's dead body, and a fierce argument erupts among the three of them. Lee blames Dominic for being responsible for the deaths of her brother and sister-in-law and locks himself out of the bedroom in the hallway, where he is murdered by the Piggy Man.

The next morning, Lee convinces Audrey that they have to go back to the Polk family compound to retrieve the video evidence of their torture by the Polks as proof of their story. Despite Audrey's protests, they agree to do so but just as they approach the front door to leave, they are confronted by a person dressed in a Piggy Man costume who turns out to be Dylan, the re-enactor who portrayed Ambrose White, much to the women's surprise.

== Reception ==
"Chapter 8" was watched by 2.20 million people during its original broadcast, and gained a 1.2 ratings share among adults aged 18–49.

The episode received mixed reviews from critics. On the review aggregator website Rotten Tomatoes, the episode holds a 63% approval rating, based on 16 reviews with an average score of 6.3/10. Tom Philips of The New York Observer wrote that the episode's "reliance on heavy gross-outs and strong character beats lead to what has to kindly be called a mixed bag". In contrast, Emily L. Stephens of The A.V. Club was more positive, writing, "The grimness of "Chapter 8" is leavened by flickers of tenderness, some of it from unexpected quarters."
