= American Horror Story: Roanoke =

Sixth season of American Horror Story

- Season 6
- Promotional poster and home media cover art
- Showrunner: Ryan Murphy
- Starring: Kathy Bates; Sarah Paulson; Cuba Gooding Jr.; Lily Rabe; André Holland; Denis O'Hare; Wes Bentley; Evan Peters; Cheyenne Jackson; Angela Bassett
- No. of episodes: 10

Release
- Original network: FX
- Original release: September 14 – November 16, 2016

Season chronology
- ← Previous; Hotel Next → Cult

The sixth season of the American horror anthology television series American Horror Story, subtitled Roanoke, follows supernatural experiences around a haunted house and its surroundings in North Carolina. The first half of the season is presented as a paranormal documentary entitled My Roanoke Nightmare, which reenacts the experiences of a married couple who lived in the house. The second half is presented as found footage and depicts the doomed production of the documentary's sequel. The ensemble cast includes Kathy Bates, Sarah Paulson, Cuba Gooding Jr., Lily Rabe, André Holland, Denis O'Hare, Wes Bentley, Evan Peters, Cheyenne Jackson, and Angela Bassett. The season is connected to Asylum, Coven, and Freak Show, with a nod to Murder House for the use of the word “croatoan” and the Piggy Man.

Created by Ryan Murphy and Brad Falchuk for the cable network FX, the series is produced by 20th Century Fox Television. Roanoke was broadcast between September 14 to November 16, 2016, consisting of 10 episodes and marking the first time the series premiered outside of October. Before the premiere, Murphy stated the sixth season would be "more rogue" and "dark" in contrast to its predecessor, Hotel. Details about its plot and cast were kept secret until the first episode aired, an unusual approach to publicity for the series. As such, it became the first iteration of the series to not release a subtitle before the season premiere. Several potential themes were theorized based on various promotional material produced by FX. After the release of pictures taken from the set in Santa Clarita, it was widely speculated that the season would incorporate the infamous 1580s Roanoke Colony disappearance. Roanoke has received mostly positive reviews.

== Cast and characters ==
=== Main ===
Roanoke main cast

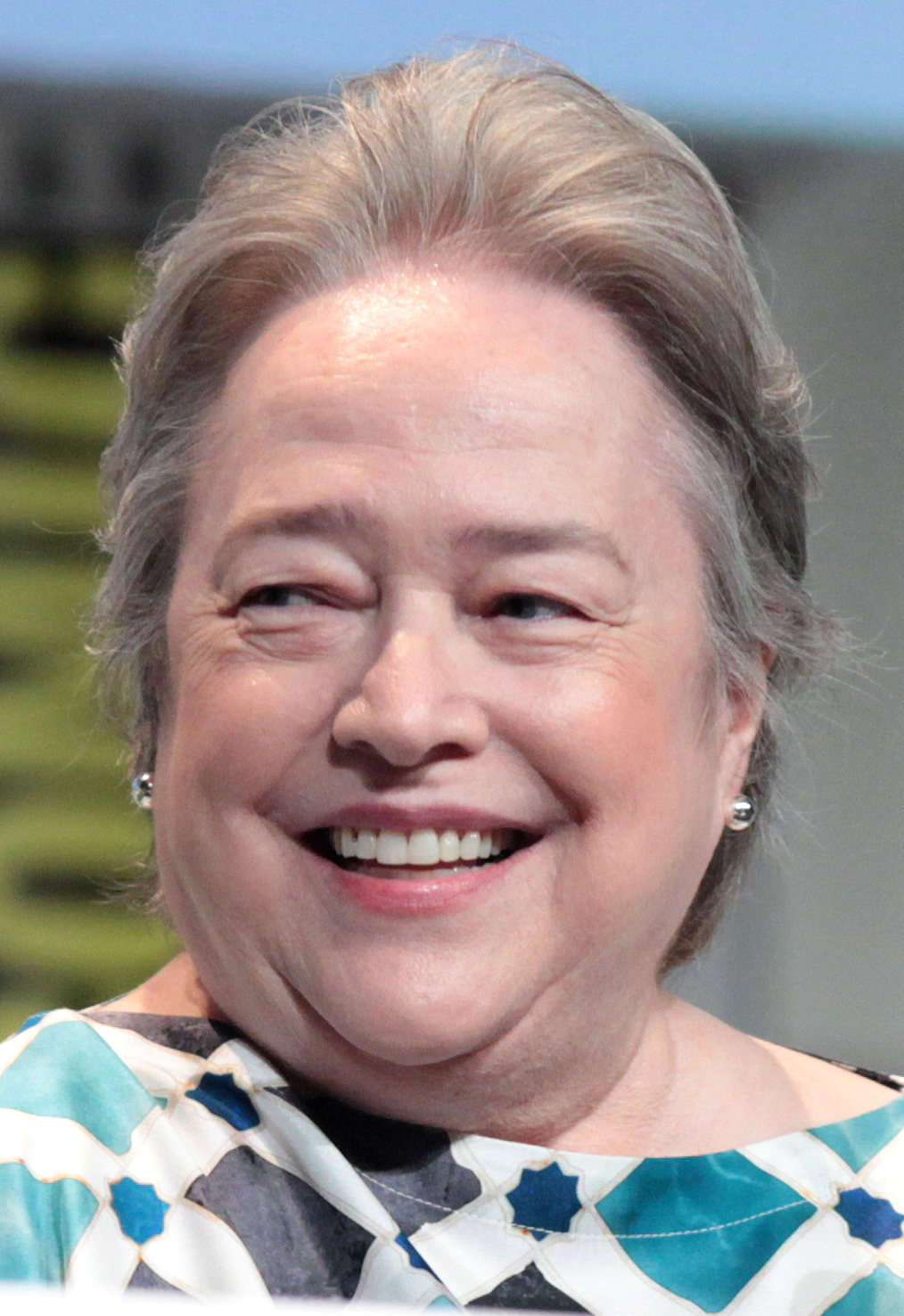
Kathy Bates

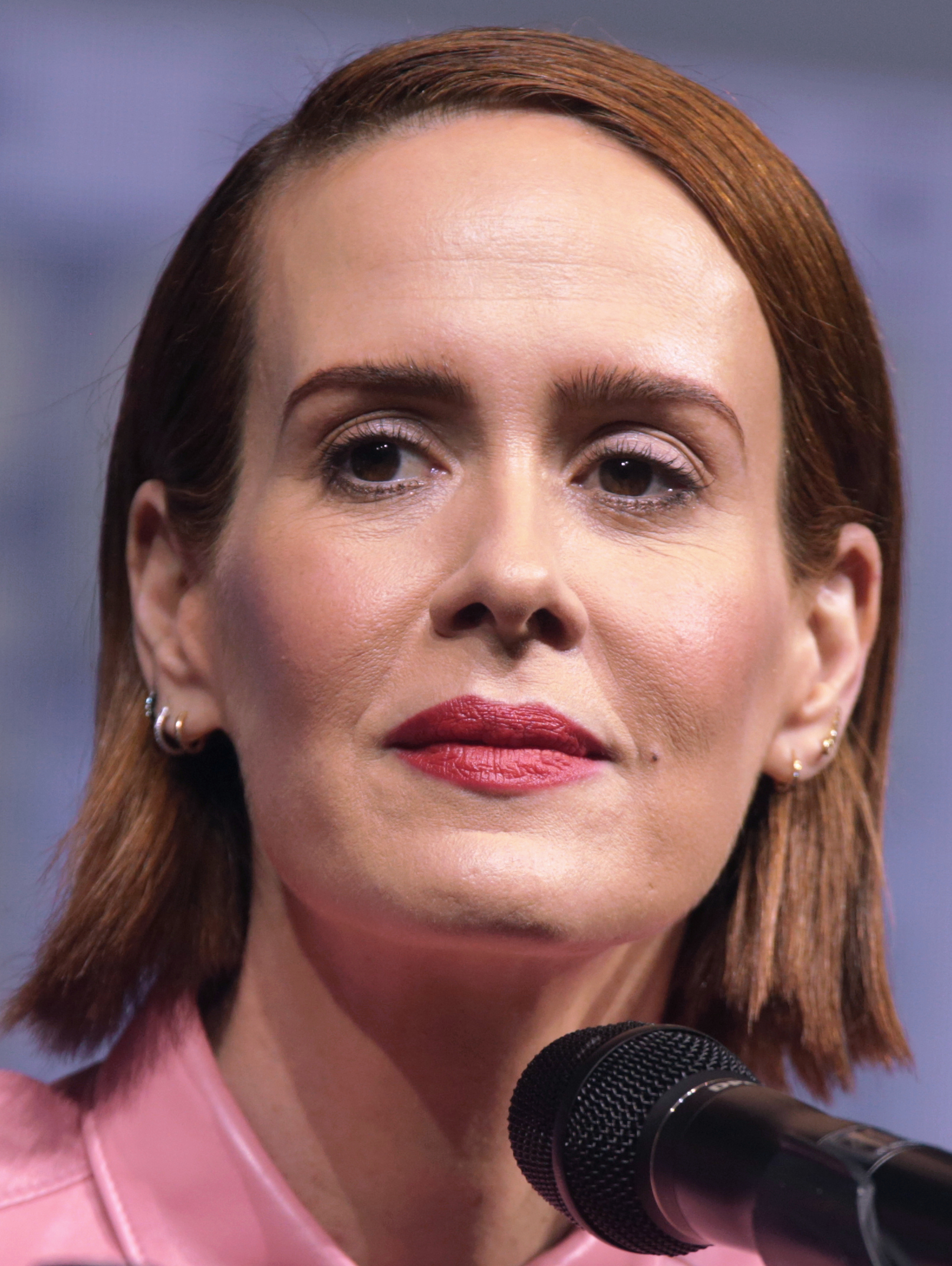
Sarah Paulson

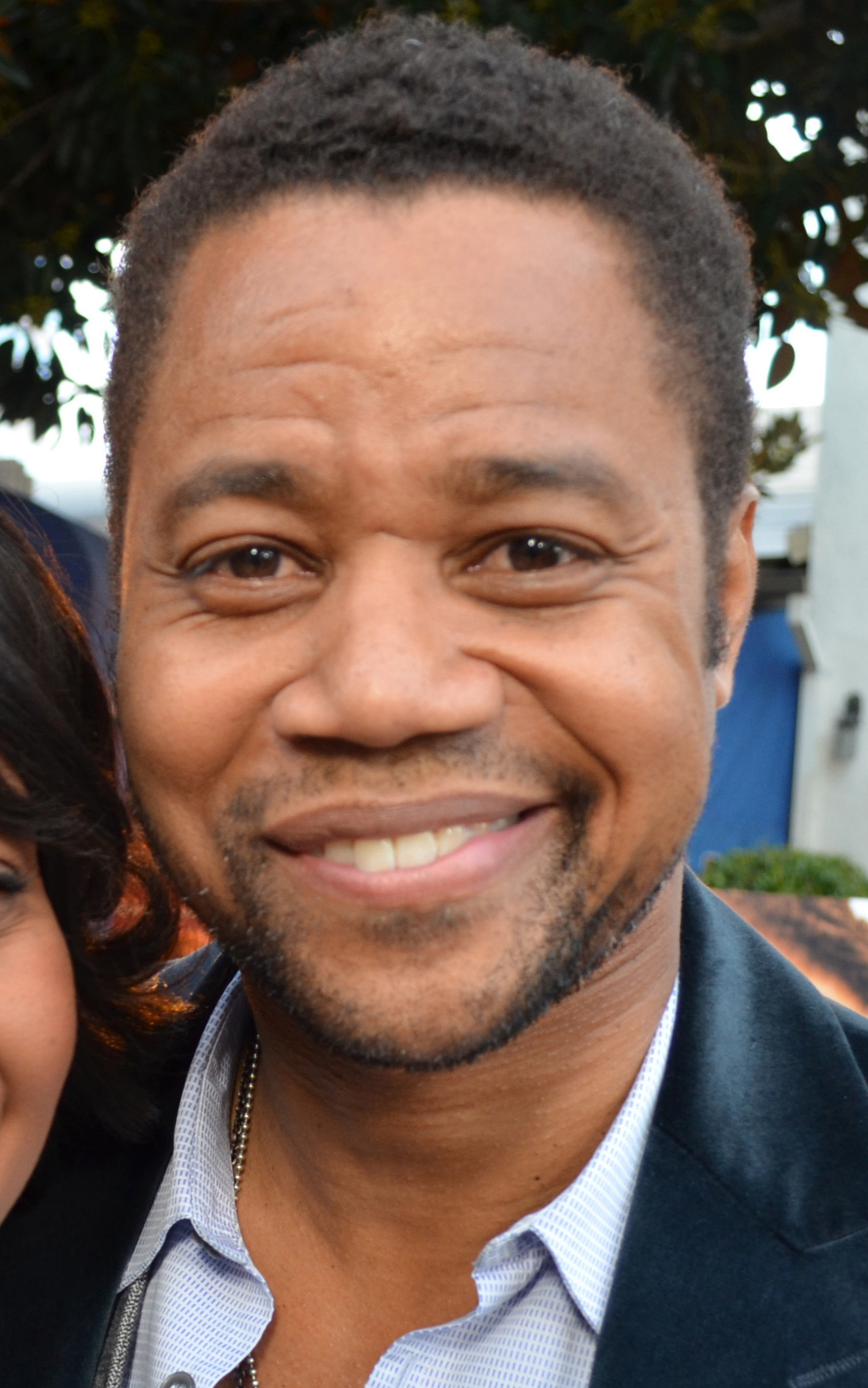
Cuba Gooding Jr.

Lily Rabe

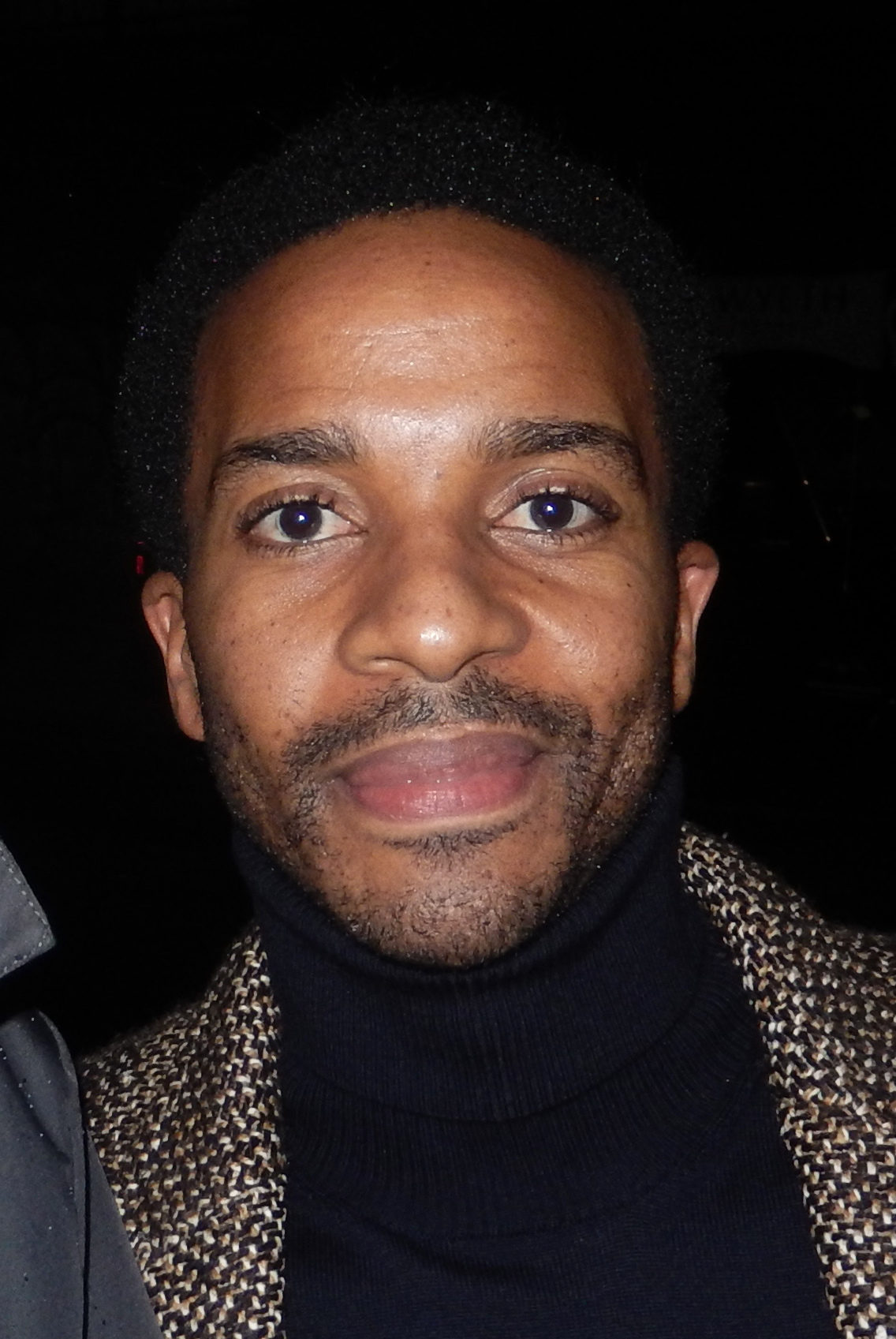
André Holland

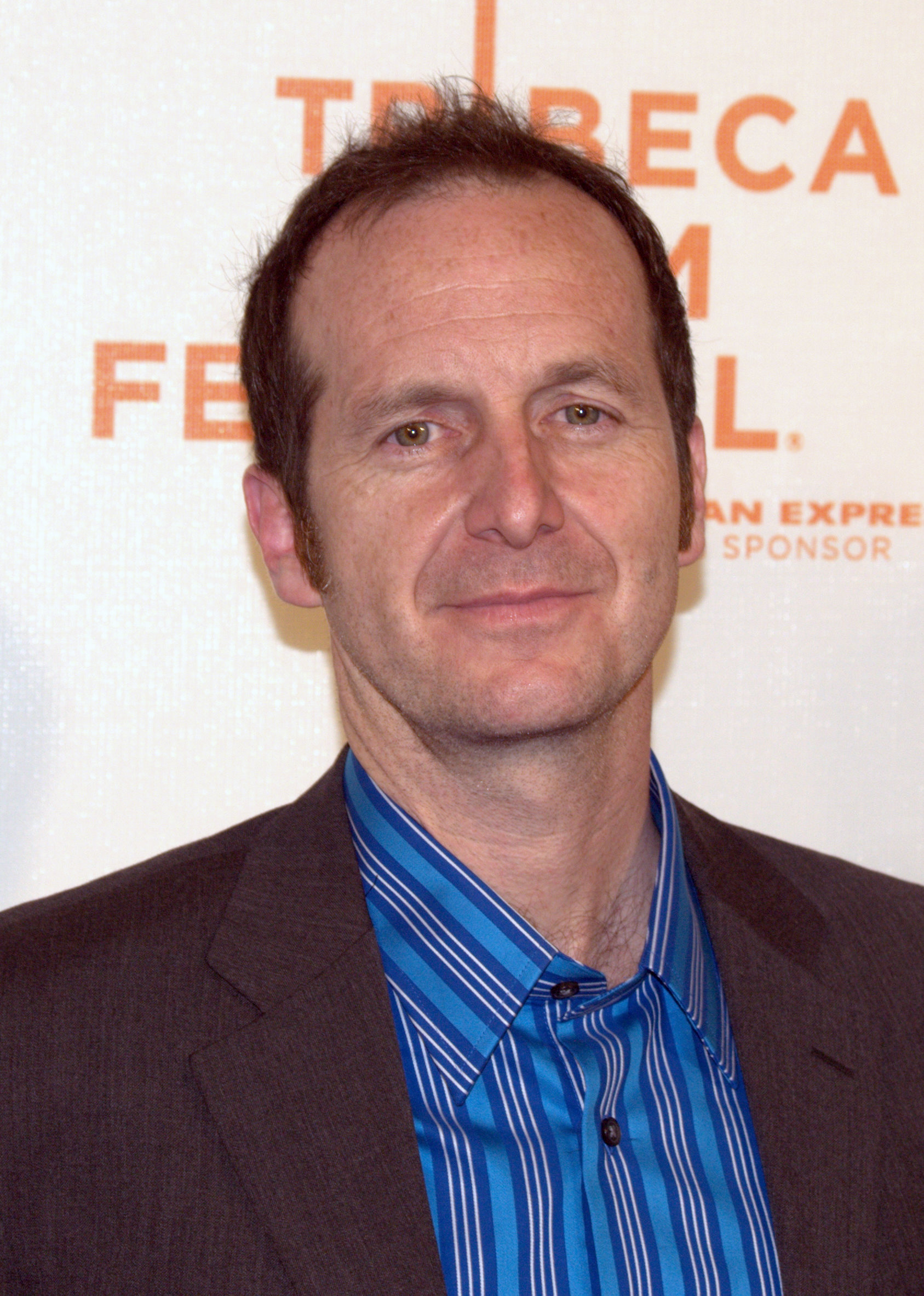
Denis O'Hare

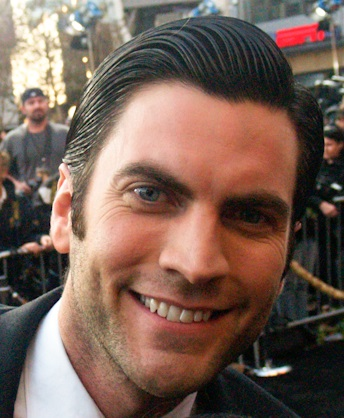
Wes Bentley

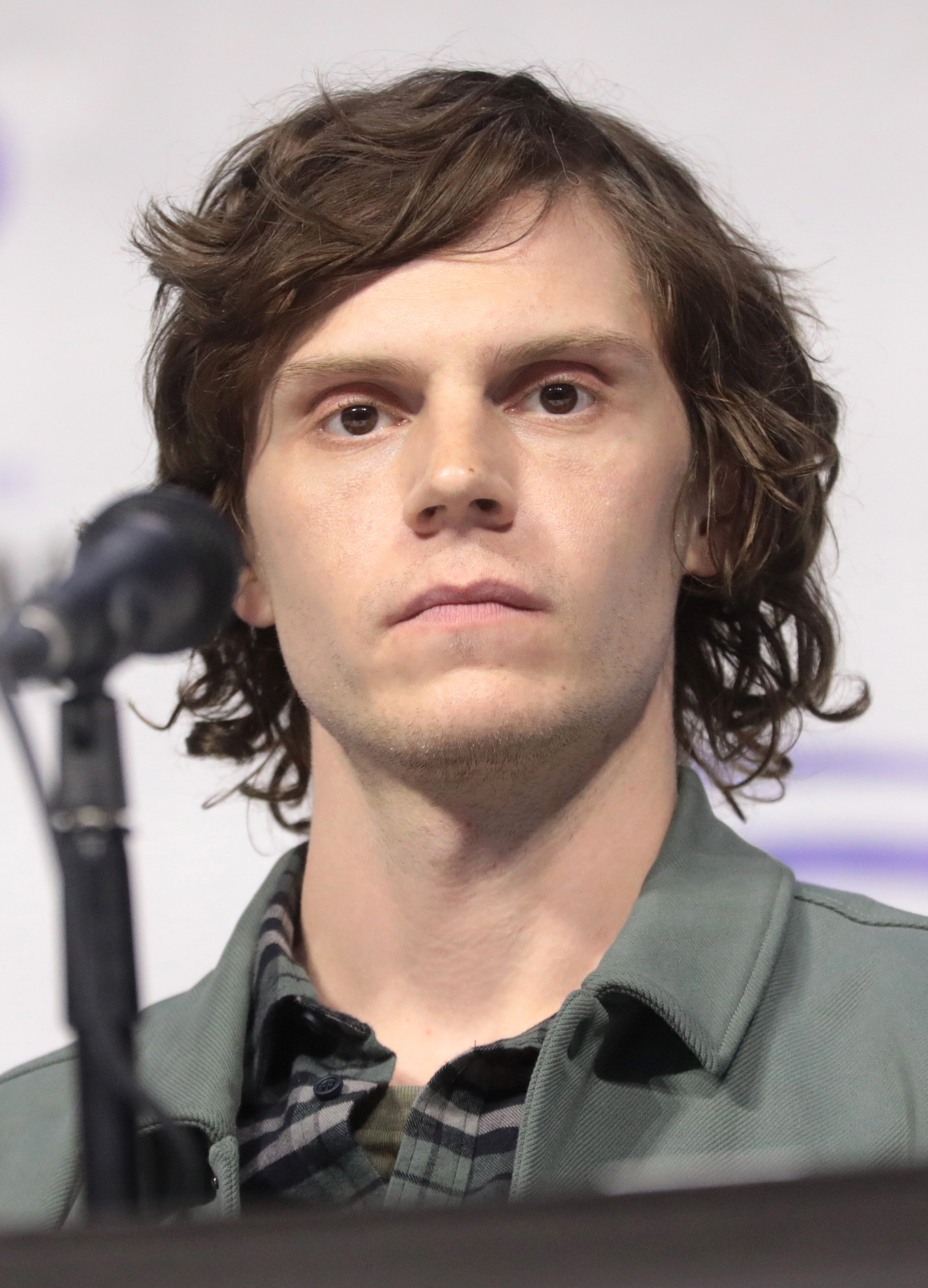
Evan Peters

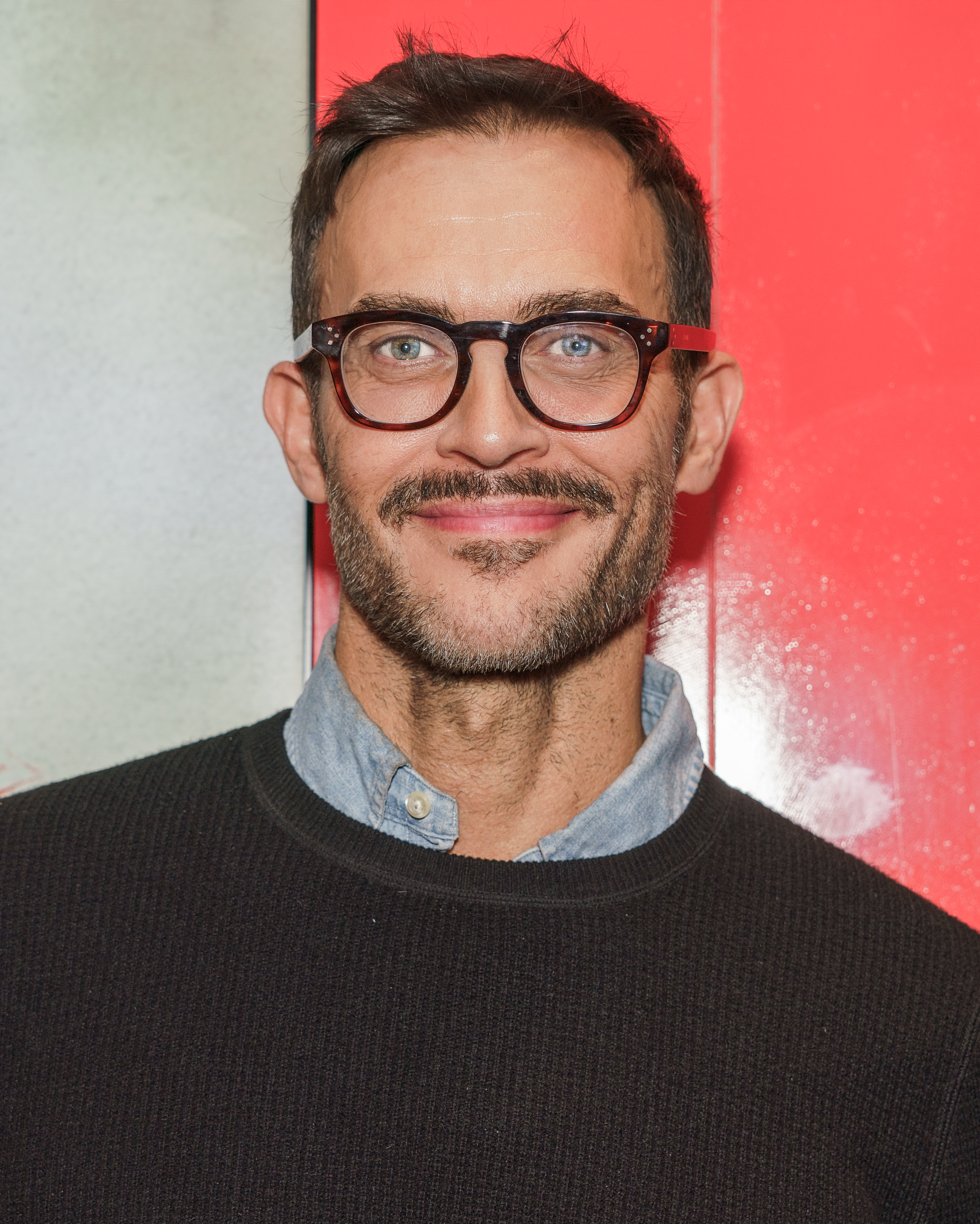
Cheyenne Jackson

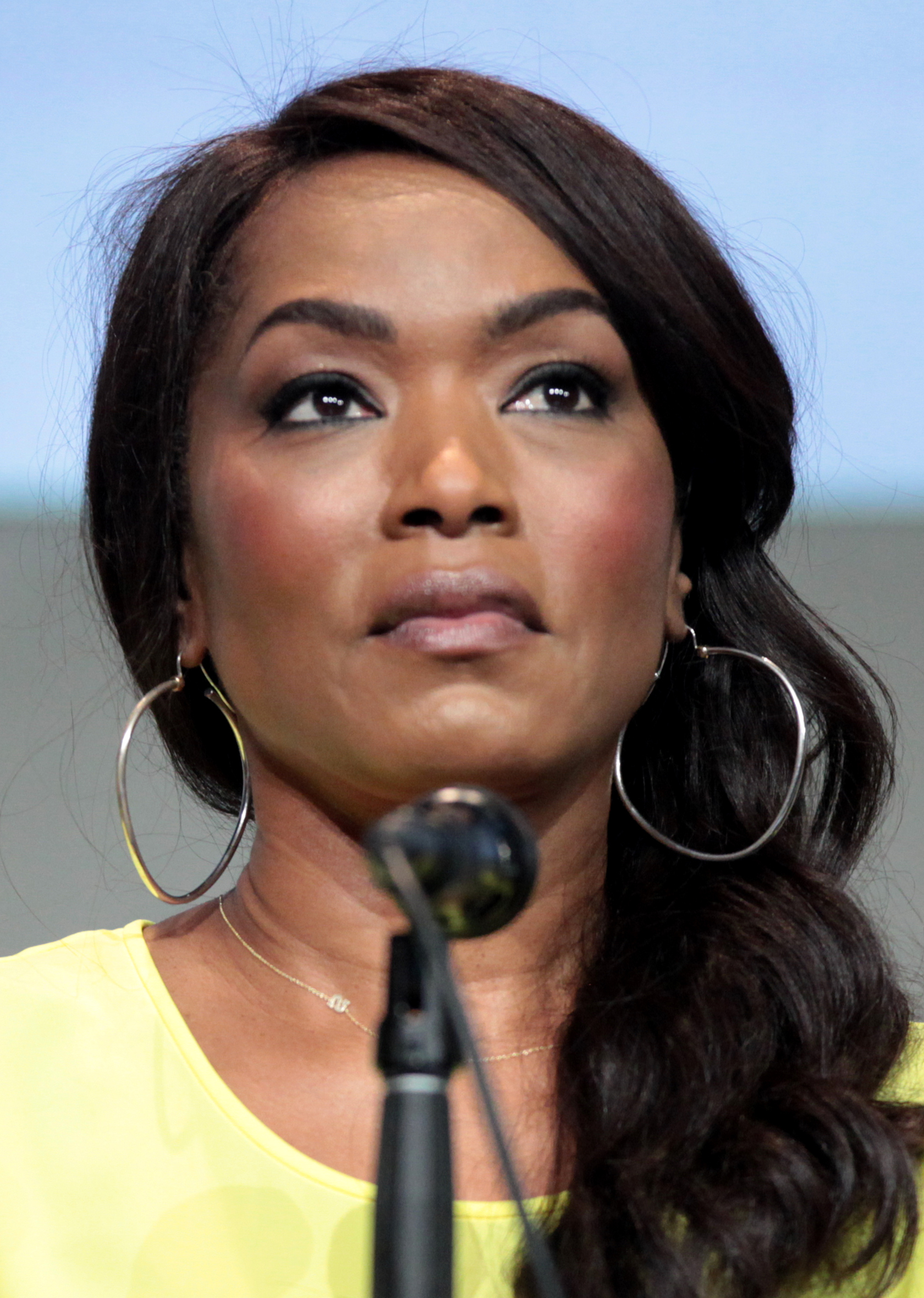
Angela Bassett

- Kathy Bates as Agnes Mary Winstead
  - Thomasin White / The Butcher in My Roanoke Nightmare
- Sarah Paulson as Audrey Tindall (Note: Paulson also portrayed her character, Lana Winters, from Asylum in episode ten of the season.)
  - Shelby Miller in My Roanoke Nightmare
  - Lana Winters
- Cuba Gooding Jr. as Dominic Banks
  - Matt Miller in My Roanoke Nightmare
- Lily Rabe as Shelby Miller
- André Holland as Matt Miller
- Denis O'Hare as William Van Henderson
  - Dr. Elias Cunningham in My Roanoke Nightmare
- Wes Bentley as Dylan Conrad
  - Ambrose White in My Roanoke Nightmare
- Evan Peters as Rory Monahan
  - Edward Philippe Mott in My Roanoke Nightmare
- Cheyenne Jackson as Sidney Aaron James
- Angela Bassett as Monet Tumusiime
  - Lee Harris in My Roanoke Nightmare

=== Special guest stars ===
- Finn Wittrock as Jether Polk
- Frances Conroy as Denise Monroe
  - Mama Polk in My Roanoke Nightmare
- Lady Gaga as Scáthach

=== Recurring ===
- Adina Porter as Lee Harris
- Charles Malik Whitfield as Noah Davies
  - Mason Harris in My Roanoke Nightmare
- Colby French as Wilson Fisher
  - Officer Connell in My Roanoke Nightmare
- Chaz Bono as Brian Wells
  - Lot Polk in My Roanoke Nightmare
- Saniyya Sidney as Skye Richards
  - Flora Harris in My Roanoke Nightmare
- Leslie Jordan as Ashley Gilbert
  - Cricket Marlowe in My Roanoke Nightmare
- Frederick Koehler as Lot Polk

=== Guest stars ===
- Grady Lee Richmond as Winston Craig
  - Ishmael Polk in My Roanoke Nightmare
- Larry Cedar as Verne Byers
  - The Auctioneer in My Roanoke Nightmare
- John Pyper-Ferguson as Billy Ford
  - Anthony Cage in My Roanoke Nightmare
- Henderson Wade as Jasper Clayton
  - Guinness in My Roanoke Nightmare
- Doris Kearns Goodwin as herself
- Shannon Lucio as Diana Cross
- Robin Weigert as Mama Polk
- Taissa Farmiga as Sophie Green
- Jacob Artist as Todd Connors
- Jon Bass as Milo Briggs
- Brian Howe as DA Mark Phillips
- Danielle Macdonald as Bristol Windows
- Julie Claire as Stephanie Holder
- Emma Bell as Tracy Logan
- James Morosini as Bob Kinnaman
- Trixie Mattel as herself
- Matt Bomer as the Crack'd Narrator (voice-only, uncredited)
- Miya Cech as Amy Chen
- Susan Berger as The Butcher

== Episodes ==
No. overall	No. in season	Title	Directed by	Written by	Original release date	Prod. code	US viewers (millions)
64	1	"Chapter 1"	Bradley Buecker	Ryan Murphy & Brad Falchuk	September 14, 2016	6ATS01	5.14
Shelby and Matt Miller are a married couple being interviewed for a documentary called My Roanoke Nightmare. Through a combination of dramatic re-enactment and testimonials, the couple reveals they fled to North Carolina from Los Angeles, after an assault as part of a gang initiation that caused Shelby to miscarry their baby. While in North Carolina, the couple finds an abandoned colonial farmhouse that they purchase in an attempt to start over again. After moving into the house, strange and violent events begin to unfold that threaten the couple. When Matt leaves on a business trip, he asks his sister Lee to stay and guard Shelby. Lee and Shelby do not get along which puts them in jeopardy, as the house is invaded by a group of people wielding knives and carrying torches. The mob leaves behind creepy totems and a video of a man encountering a creature that has the head of a pig and the body of a man. When Matt wants to stay in the house, rather than flee, Shelby escapes in Matt's car. After hitting a woman on the road, Shelby witnesses a ritualistic murder in the woods.
65	2	"Chapter 2"	Michael Goi	Tim Minear	September 21, 2016	6ATS02	3.27
Shelby assumes the ritual she witnessed was staged; she and Matt resolve to stay in the house. After discovering a burning totem in the woods near the house, Matt and Shelby finally secure the help of the local police. Unnerving and mysterious events continue to affect the house's residents, this time including Matt, Lee, and her daughter Flora. Shelby and Matt discover a storm cellar under the backyard; there, they view a recording created by the man from the first video. He was a previous resident who came to the house to research it; he details the house's previous use as a nursing home where two sisters committed multiple murders. Shelby and Matt realize that they are trapped because all their money is tied up in the house, and they have no way out. Meanwhile, Lee violates her custody agreement with her ex-husband, Mason, and brings Flora to the house in an attempt to spend time with her. Flora encounters an entity, "Priscilla," who tells her that everyone in the house will be murdered. Flora disappears, and the adults find her hoodie atop a massive pine tree.
66	3	"Chapter 3"	Jennifer Lynch	James Wong	September 28, 2016	6ATS03	3.08
While searching for Flora, Lee's ex-husband, Mason, is found dead. Shelby suspects Lee and the security cameras show that she followed him out of the house during the night. Meanwhile, the hillbilly family vanishes, leaving behind their two feral sons. Cricket, a psychic, claims to be able to locate Flora, and Lee pays him $25,000. In the documentary interview, Lee reluctantly discusses the disappearance of her first daughter many years earlier. Cricket reveals that Priscilla is a dead 16th-century child, and the area is haunted by spirits led by "The Butcher," formerly Thomasin White, the first lady of the Roanoke Colony. The colonists rebelled against Thomasin in her husband's absence and left her for dead. In desperation, she gave her soul to a mysterious witch, Scathach, and violently retook control of the colony, forcing them to relocate to what is now Shelby and Matt's property. Matt disappears during a confrontation with the spirits, and Shelby finds him copulating with Scathach. Matt does not recall these events, and as they argue, the police arrive to arrest Lee, tipped off by Shelby.
67	4	"Chapter 4"	Marita Grabiak	John J. Gray	October 5, 2016	6ATS04	2.83
Following Matt's affair with Scathach, Shelby thinks that Matt and Lee are conspiring against her. Later that night, Shelby is attacked by the Piggy Man and is saved by Dr. Cunningham. Dr. Cunningham reveals the history of the paranormal activity of the house to the Millers. He reveals that Thomasin is responsible for all the disappearances in the house and all of them occur on the same six-day lunar cycle in October. Dr. Cunningham leads the Millers to Flora but is killed by Thomasin's men. As the Millers rush home, they encounter Cricket. Cricket heads back into the woods and comes face to face with Scathach, who is revealed to be the true leader of the Roanoke Colony. She shows Cricket what happened to the lost colony of Roanoke. Through his own experience with Scathach, Matt learns some of her backstory. Before Matt can finish learning her backstory, he is interrupted by Shelby's screams. Thomasin's mob surrounds the house with Flora in their possession, but Priscilla helps to free her. All the Millers flee into the house, and Shelby and Matt witness the mob disemboweling Cricket.
68	5	"Chapter 5"	Nelson Cragg	Akela Cooper	October 12, 2016	6ATS05	2.82
Doris Kearns Goodwin reveals the backstory of one of the owners of the Roanoke House, Edward Philippe Mott, and his subsequent ownership of the property. Mott used the property as a storage house for his art collection and covert homosexual affairs with one of his slaves. During the blood moon, he was sacrificed by Thomasin and her men. In the present, Thomasin's mob surrounds the house, ready to kill the Millers. The mob attacks the house, and just when all seems lost, Edward Philippe Mott arrives and leads the Millers to safety. However, he abandons the Millers out in the woods leading to them being kidnapped by the Polk family. Meanwhile, Lee is released from police custody due to a lack of evidence. The Millers attempt to escape, which leads to Mama Polk breaking Shelby's leg. The Polks return the Millers to Thomasin as revenge for the loss of their two children. Just as Thomasin is about to sacrifice the Miller family, Ambrose stops her from completing the ritual and pushes her into the fire in penance for the colonies' sins. Edward then reappears and unties Matt and Shelby. Then, Lee arrives back at the house and flees the property in her car. Afterward, the Millers decided to head back to Los Angeles to return to a normal life.
69	6	"Chapter 6"	Angela Bassett	Ned Martel	October 19, 2016	6ATS06	2.48
My Roanoke Nightmare was a massive success during its run, attracting over 23 million viewers. Spurred by its success, Sidney, the network executive and producer pitches a new idea for a follow-up series entitled Return to Roanoke: Three Days in Hell where the reenactors and their real-world counterparts are brought together in the Roanoke house for three days during the blood moon. Sidney reveals that his motive for producing the follow-up is to expose Lee for the murder of Mason. The real Shelby Miller is reluctant to participate in the new series but is convinced to do it by a chance to reconnect with her estranged husband, Matt. As part of the new series, the lives of the reenactors who portrayed these events are explored. As the crew prepares the house for filming, strange events begin to unfold. As the series commences, the reenactors begin to get a taste of the true horrors within the house. It is revealed that throughout the new series, all but one of the participants died in the house, and that the series never made it to air. The first victim was Rory, the reenactor who played Edward Philippe Mott, whom the two nurses murdered.
70	7	"Chapter 7"	Elodie Keene	Crystal Liu	October 26, 2016	6ATS07	2.62
Following Rory's murder, Agnes, who is completely consumed by her role as Thomasin, murders Sidney and his entire production team. Meanwhile, tensions in the house continue to rise as Matt, Shelby, and Dominic argue about Shelby's infidelity, and Lee and Monet go back and forth about her alcoholism. Their argument is interrupted when Agnes appears and attacks Shelby, forcing Lee, Audrey, and Monet to go into the woods to find help. On the way to find help, Audrey and Monet begin to encounter various supernatural occurrences that frighten them. Eventually, the three women are kidnapped by the Polk family and are taken back to their farm, where the Polks proceed to cut a strip off Lee's leg and feed it to Audrey and Monet. Meanwhile, inside the house, Dominic and Shelby come across Matt having sex with Scathach. Matt admits he came back to the house for Scathach, causing Shelby to brutally beat him to death in a fit of rage. Then, Agnes lights a fire outside the house, demanding satisfaction from the occupants of it. Just then, the real Thomasin and her mob surround Agnes, and Thomasin kills Agnes by thrusting her cleaver into Agnes' face.
71	8	"Chapter 8"	Gwyneth Horder-Payton	Todd Kubrak	November 2, 2016	6ATS08	2.20
After Agnes's murder, Dominic and Shelby begin planning to escape the house. They decide to flee out of the secret passage but are foiled by the ghosts of the Chen family attacking them. This forces the pair to flee upstairs and lock themselves in a bathroom but are attacked by the Piggy Man, the skittering creature, and Thomasin's mob along the way. Once they are safely inside, Shelby slits her throat out of guilt for murdering Matt. Meanwhile, the three women continue to be tortured by the Polk family, with Lee losing more of her flesh and Audrey having one of her teeth ripped out. Eventually, the women manage to escape, killing two Polks in the process. However, only Audrey and Lee make it back to the house, as the two remaining Polks are hunting down Monet. Back at the house, the two women come across Matt's body. Then, the two find Shelby's body and Dominic in the bathroom. The two blame Dominic for the death of Shelby and Matt, forcing him out into the hall, where the Piggy Man murders him. The next morning, Dylan arrives at the house to the two women's surprise.
72	9	"Chapter 9"	Alexis O. Korycinski	Tim Minear	November 9, 2016	6ATS09	2.43
Sophie, Milo, and Todd, three fanatics of My Roanoke Nightmare, head into the woods searching for the Roanoke house. They stop to take pictures of the tree where Flora's jacket was found but are interrupted by a bloodied woman who begs for help. The three chase after the woman, only to come across her dead body in an overturned car. When the three report it to the police, the police tell them that they found nobody and that they need to stop making things up. Meanwhile, Audrey, Lee, and Dylan return to the Polk compound to recover Lee's taped confession and Monet, as well as to escape. Lot murders Dylan, and the three women succeed in escaping the incoming mob but are separated in the woods. The three bloggers return to the woods under the cover of night to expose the truth, only to be murdered by Lee (possessed by Scathach), Thomasin, and her mob. Lee also murders Monet and attempts to murder Audrey. The next morning, the police arrive to find the carnage. Having survived her wounds, Audrey grabs an officer's gun to shoot Lee in vengeance and is gunned down by the police.
73	10	"Chapter 10"	Bradley Buecker	Ryan Murphy & Brad Falchuk	November 16, 2016	6ATS10	2.45
Following Lee's murders, three different series, Crack'd, The Lana Winters Special, and Spirit Chasers, attempt to understand what could have driven her to kill. On Crack'd, Lee's trial and subsequent acquittal for her murders are covered. On The Lana Winters Special, famed reporter Lana Winters interviews Lee about her daughter's disappearance, believing that Lee retook her. The interview is interrupted by the arrival of Lot Polk, who threatens violence against Lee until he is shot. On Spirit Chasers, a group of paranormal investigators, including Ashley Gilbert (Cricket's reenactor), trespass into the Roanoke house during the blood moon to capture the spirits on film. They are interrupted by Lee, who bursts in looking for Flora. The ghosts murder all of the Spirit Chasers crew and Ashley. Lee finally reunites with Flora and, following an emotional reunion, Lee decides to sacrifice herself so she can protect Priscilla and give Flora a chance at life. Flora leaves the house and watches as her mother walks off into the woods with Priscilla. From a hilltop, Thomasin watches over her mob as they begin to surround the house once again.

== Production ==
=== Development ===
"We just thought it would really be fun to keep it a mystery, so we are; we just thought that would be a nice change after doing things one way for five years."

— FX president and CEO John Landgraf on the marketing strategy for the sixth season

On November 10, 2015, the network renewed the series for a sixth cycle; which premiered on September 14, 2016. In August 2015, co-creator Ryan Murphy commented on the sixth year, stating, "The next thing we're crafting up is very very different than [Hotel], not smaller. But just not opulent. More rogue and more dark." In October 2015, when questioned about clues and hints alluding to the sixth season (as has been the status quo since the first season of the series) in Hotel, Murphy revealed he had yet to definitively decide on a theme, "This is an interesting year in that the idea that we're dealing with I've mentioned in several seasons. It's been there before. We've actually talked about it a lot on the show. I might do that for season 7 but I'm leaning towards that for season 6." In January 2016, FX president John Landgraf revealed that the season will be "principally set in the present", with a dual timeline in "echoes of the past". He also confirmed a fall 2016 premiere. At the 2016 PaleyFest, Murphy divulged that the two previous ideas [the writers] had been considering had been merged into season six, saying it will involve children and operatic themes. The season will consist of 10 episodes, the least in a given cycle, in the show's history; with the finale scheduled to air November 16, 2016. On September 1, 2016, it was reported by Entertainment Weekly that the season was possibly subtitled The Mist, as a Rotten Tomatoes page and TV Guide magazine had printed; which was later proven untrue. There is a direct connection to Freak Show with an exploration of the Mott family origin.

In a late September issue of Entertainment Weekly, Falchuk and Murphy revealed there would be a major twist coming to the series in "Chapter 6". Murphy said of the matter, "You'll see starting in episode 6, the show has a huge turn, and the thing that you think you're watching is not what you're watching, It's a hat on a hat on a hat on a hat that we've had to protect." Falchuk added, "No matter what you think it is, it's not that. Then, episode 6 comes, and you're like, 'Wait! What happened?' It's like [episodes] 1–5, 6–9, and 10 is its own thing." Murphy went on to confirm the turn in the season being a behind-the-camera look at the production of the faux-documentary My Roanoke Nightmare. He also stated that the final episode will feature characters, and their mythologies, that will continue on in the overall series.

==== Set design ====
Colonial ware and design are incorporated into the season, which is theorized to be, at least partially, set in 1590 Roanoke, North Carolina. A pioneer cottage is incorporated in Santa Clarita, California. The set is fully dressed in time-period appropriate dressings, including an etched tree. The production designers constructed an entire colonial house that serves as the season's chief setting. The house was constructed in an undisclosed California forest over four months. The abode is completely functional, furnished, and finished inside and out. This is the first time in American Horror Story history that a complete home has been built, and it is quite unprecedented for film and television productions in general. A three-story set built in Malibu Canyon was not permitted properly, and after being torn down in October 2016, FX "will be required to do extensive restoration."

=== Casting ===
In October 2015, Murphy tweeted that he had asked Lady Gaga to join the untitled season, but did not expect an answer anytime soon. She later confirmed her involvement in March 2016. Emma Roberts had stated that she and Murphy have talked about a "devilish" role for her in the season. Despite this, Roberts did not appear in the season. Taissa Farmiga was heavily rumored to be involved with the season in some form. Murphy later confirmed that Farmiga would appear late in the season. In February 2016, Angela Bassett confirmed her return to the series during an interview on Larry King Now, being the first cast member added to the season 6 roster. She portrays Monet Tumusiime, a re-enactor of the documentary's horrific events. At PaleyFest, Murphy invited Kathy Bates, Denis O'Hare, Sarah Paulson, Finn Wittrock, Cheyenne Jackson, Wes Bentley, and Matt Bomer to return to the show for its sixth season. In May 2016, Jessica Lange stated in an interview with Charlie Rose, that she would not be returning for the sixth or any other future season of the series; saying, "No, I had four years with that, four seasons, and each year was a marvelous character, everything changed from one year to another which made it very interesting to me. But no, I think sometimes you come to the end of something...

In June 2016, Leslie Jordan, who appeared in Coven, announced his return to the series, stating he had been approached to appear in Freak Show, but declined. He was surprised to get a call from Murphy again. Later in the month, Bomer, Jackson, and Evan Peters confirmed their involvement with the sixth season. O'Hare stated he would return in some capacity in a May 2016 interview. Us Weekly has reported the returns of Bentley, Bates, and Wittrock. In an early August 2016 interview with Glamour, series veteran Sarah Paulson announced her return for the sixth year. She said of the show, "I just think I have the greatest job on the planet because my TV show [American Horror Story] is going into its sixth season and I'm playing an entirely different character, like nothing I've ever played." She plays the featured re-enactor in the horrific documentary. On Halloween 2016, Murphy announced the return of Paulson's Asylum character, Lana Winters. TMZ reported the casting of The People v. O. J. Simpson: American Crime Story actor Cuba Gooding Jr. Gooding Jr. himself later went on to confirm his presence in the season, also announcing that he will share most screen-time with co-star Paulson, stating, "It's really been a treat to finally engage with her on camera, because when we did The People v. O. J. it was more about my scenes and then her scenes and us being in the courtroom but separate, but we're not separate no more!" He plays the co-lead of the My Roanoke Nightmare documentary. In September 2016, Jacob Artist announced his involvement with the sixth season. In the same month, the main casting was announced after the first episode with the addition of André Holland and series veteran Lily Rabe portraying the real-life couple, Matt Miller (Lee's brother) and his wife Shelby from the documentary's interviews. Adina Porter, after a small guest appearance on an episode of Murder House, portrayed the real Lee Harris.

=== Filming ===
In March 2016, the series received a major tax credit for filming of the season in Los Angeles, California. Cast member Angela Bassett, along with Jennifer Lynch, Marita Grabiak, Gwyneth Horder-Payton, Elodie Keene, and Alexis Korycinski were set as directors during the season, marking the first time women have served in the capacity on the show. In June 2016, cast member Jackson stated that the season had already clandestinely begun principal photography earlier that month. On August 1, 2016, TMZ published photographs of the American Horror Story set in Santa Clarita, California; that consists of a small Pioneer home, and a tree with the word "Croatoan" carved into its center. Both of these things are attributed to the 1590 colony of 117 people, in Roanoke, North Carolina, that disappeared without a trace, and the only clue left was the carving – the name being a nearby island and tribe of Native Americans. Later, TMZ unveiled more set photos from an unknown California forest.

== Marketing ==
=== Campaign ===
"After all the breadcrumbs, you are definitely going to get the sandwich. There's no bait and switch here. It was about celebrating the building and worshiping the anticipation."

— FX Head of Marketing Stephanie Gibbons on the fear that the publicity wouldn't materialize a quality season

The marketing campaign for the season was one of mystery. On June 6, 2016, all of the series' social media pages displayed a teaser image of a red number six, with a question mark superimposed. Little was known about plot details or casting before the premiere, which seems to be a deliberate ploy of publicity. The following months saw a virtual reality experience at the 2016 San Diego Comic-Con, a multitude of motley teaser trailers and posters, a Mercedes-Benz sweepstakes; and no casting or plot announcements. At the Television Critics Association Summer Press Tour, on August 9, 2016, FX chief John Landgraf announced that all, but one, of the teaser trailers released thus far, have been deliberate misdirects by the network. Explaining, "[Murphy and Stephanie Gibbons, FX head of marketing and on-air promotions] went out and made many more trailers than you've actually seen for hypothetical seasons of American Horror Story, meaning different genres and different places". Landgraf also reiterated what had been previously reported, that the official theme of the cycle will not be revealed until the airing of the first episode.

A week before the premiere, FX released a trailer featuring Lady Gaga's new single "Perfect Illusion," speaking to the anonymity of the season. In a September 13, 2016 interview with The Hollywood Reporter, marketing chief Stephanie Gibbons spoke at length about the risks and idea behind the season's complete anonymity. Explaining the origin of her campaign, "I felt we would play on two aspects of the human helix: Desire to know, the curiosity to find out what you don't know; and perhaps more importantly, the notion of how powerful withholding is to the human psyche. Often wanting is more fulfilling than having."

== Reception ==
=== Critical response ===
American Horror Story: Roanoke received mostly positive reviews from critics. The review aggregator Rotten Tomatoes gave the season a 74% approval rating, with an average rating of 6.68/10, based on 160 reviews. The site's consensus reads, "American Horror Story: Roanoke takes a surprising turn away from prior AHS formats, revisiting the deliberate pace of earlier seasons on a spookier, smaller scale, even if the true-crime format feels overdone." On Metacritic, the season was given a score of 72 out of 100 based on 9 reviews, indicating "generally positive reviews", making it the best-reviewed season on that site.

Dan Fienberg of The Hollywood Reporter gave a positive review, writing, "When you're the type of show prone to kicking off a season with the introduction of a hairless mole man with a killer dildo, it's possible that the most provocative thing you can do to start a chapter is eschewing mole men, dildos and, in fact, killing altogether for a full week. The American Horror Story franchise has been and done many things, but it's never offered such a false sense of security, so this subdued start may be the scariest promise of all. It's the most curious I've been about future installments in a long time." Jeff Jensen of Entertainment Weekly also gave a positive review, writing, "The use of mystery to market the season may have been contrived, but at this point, mystery might also be the best thing going for it, too." Ben Travers of IndieWire called the premiere "a promising start with a central mystery as tantalizing as the ads teasing it."

=== Ratings ===
Viewership and ratings per episode of American Horror Story: Roanoke
No.	Title	Air date	Rating/share (18–49)	Viewers (millions)	DVR (18–49)	DVR viewers (millions)	Total (18–49)	Total viewers (millions)
1	"Chapter 1"	September 14, 2016	2.8	5.14	TBD	TBD	TBD	TBD
2	"Chapter 2"	September 21, 2016	1.8	3.27	TBD	TBD	TBD	TBD
3	"Chapter 3"	September 28, 2016	1.7	3.08	1.6	2.95	3.3	6.03^{1}
4	"Chapter 4"	October 5, 2016	1.4	2.83	1.8	3.30	3.2	6.13
5	"Chapter 5"	October 12, 2016	1.5	2.82	1.7	3.31	3.2	6.14
6	"Chapter 6"	October 19, 2016	1.4	2.48	1.8	3.50	3.2	5.99
7	"Chapter 7"	October 26, 2016	1.4	2.62	1.8	3.23	3.2	5.85
8	"Chapter 8"	November 2, 2016	1.2	2.20	1.9	3.37	3.1	5.57
9	"Chapter 9"	November 9, 2016	1.3	2.43	1.3	2.30	2.6	4.73^{1}
10	"Chapter 10"	November 16, 2016	1.3	2.45	1.7	2.99	3.0	5.44

^1 Live +7 ratings were not available, so Live +3 ratings have been used instead.

Nielsen Media Research, which records streaming viewership on certain U.S. television screens, reported that American Horror Story: Roanoke garnered 254 million minutes of watch time, averaging 25.4 million minutes viewed per episode, between May 1, 2024, and August 31, 2026.

=== Retrospective comments from Sarah Paulson ===
In June 2021, Sarah Paulson was interviewed for Awards Chatter, a podcast from The Hollywood Reporter. During the interview, she expressed regret at having filmed the season, stating:

I just don't care about this season at all. I know people will get mad at me for saying it, but to me, this was post having played Marcia and it was what I went to do right after finishing Marcia, and I was so underwhelmed by the whole experience because I felt like I had entered into a new place inside of myself in terms of what I thought possible, in terms of what I might be willing to see if I can do. I felt really kind of trapped by my responsibility and my contractual obligation to do American Horror Story. As much as it's my home and I've loved it always, it was the first time I felt like I wish I could have gone to Ryan and said please let me sit this one out. You know, let me out.

Paulson was given the option not to appear in American Horror Story's seventh season, entitled Cult. She ultimately chose to do the season, inspired by the provocative story, which explored the aftermath of the 2016 presidential election. Her comments about Roanoke were referenced in the seventh episode of American Horror Stories.

== Accolades ==
In its sixth season, the series has been nominated for 23 awards. 5 of them were won.

Year	Award	Category	Nominated artist/work	Result
2017	43rd People's Choice Awards	Favorite Cable TV Sci-Fi/Fantasy Show	American Horror Story: Roanoke	Nominated
2017	21st Art Directors Guild Awards	Television Movie or Limited Series	Andrew Murdock (for "Chapter 4")	Nominated
2017	Make-Up Artists and Hair Stylists Guild 2017	TV Miniseries or Movie Made for TV: Best Contemporary Hair Styling	Michelle Ceglia, Valerie Jackson	Won
2017	Make-Up Artists and Hair Stylists Guild 2017	TV Miniseries or Movie Made for TV: Best Period and/or Character Make-Up	Eryn Krueger Mekash, Kim Ayers, Silvina Knight	Nominated
2017	Make-Up Artists and Hair Stylists Guild 2017	TV Miniseries or Movie Made for TV: Best Period and/or Character Hair Styling	Michelle Ceglia, Valerie Jackson	Nominated
2017	Make-Up Artists and Hair Stylists Guild 2017	TV Miniseries or Movie Made for TV: Best Special Make-Up Effects	Eryn Krueger Mekash, Michael Mekash, David Anderson	Won
2017	Make-Up Artists and Hair Stylists Guild 2017	Commercials and Music Videos: Best Make-Up	Kerry Herta, Jason Collins, Cristina Waltz (for "Promo")	Won
2017	19th Costume Designers Guild Awards	Contemporary TV Series	Lou Eyrich, Helen Huang	Won
2017	17th Black Reel Awards	Best Supporting Actress in a TV Movie or Limited Series	Angela Bassett	Nominated
2017	17th Black Reel Awards	Outstanding Director in a Television Miniseries or Movie	Angela Bassett	Nominated
2017	20th Fangoria Chainsaw Awards	Best TV Supporting Actress	Sarah Paulson	Nominated
2017	20th Fangoria Chainsaw Awards	Best TV SFX	Eryn Krueger Mekash, David LeRoy Anderson	Nominated
2017	15th Gold Derby Awards	Best Miniseries	American Horror Story: Roanoke	Nominated
2017	43rd Saturn Awards	Best Horror Television Series	American Horror Story: Roanoke	Nominated
2017	43rd Saturn Awards	Best Actress on Television	Sarah Paulson	Nominated
2017	43rd Saturn Awards	Best Supporting Actress on Television	Kathy Bates	Nominated
2017	43rd Saturn Awards	Best Supporting Actress on Television	Adina Porter	Nominated
2017	43rd Saturn Awards	Best Guest Starring Role on Television	Leslie Jordan	Nominated
2017	2017 MTV Movie & TV Awards	Best Villain	Wes Bentley	Nominated
2017	69th Primetime Creative Arts Emmy Awards	Outstanding Hairstyling for a Limited Series or a Movie	Michelle Ceglia, Valerie Jackson, Jose Zamora	Nominated
2017	69th Primetime Creative Arts Emmy Awards	Outstanding Makeup for a Limited Series or Movie (Non-Prosthetic)	Kim Ayers, Mike Mekash, Eryn Krueger Mekash, Silvina Knight, Carleigh Herbert, Luis Garcia	Nominated
2017	69th Primetime Creative Arts Emmy Awards	Outstanding Prosthetic Makeup for a Series, Limited Series, Movie or a Special	Eryn Krueger Mekash, Michael Mekash, David Leroy Anderson, James Mackinnon, Jason Hamer, Melanie Eichner, Cristina Himiob, Maiko Chiba	Won
2017	69th Primetime Creative Arts Emmy Awards	Outstanding Sound Editing for a Limited Series, Movie, or Special	Gary Megregian, Steve M. Stuhr, Jason Krane, Timothy A. Cleveland, Paul Diller, David Klotz, Noel Vought (for "Chapter 1")	Nominated

== Home media ==
American Horror Story: Roanoke – The Complete Sixth Season
Set Details		Special Features
10 Episodes; 3 Disc Set (DVD); 3 Disc Set (BD); English 5.1 Dolby Digital, French & Spanish 2.0 Surround; Subtitles: English SDH, Spanish, French; Runtime: 399 Minutes		The Paley Center for Media: Q&A with Cast and Creative Team from Paleyfest 2017; American Horror Story: Roanoke Promos
Release Dates
Region 1	Region 2	Region 4
October 3, 2017	September 11, 2017	March 16, 2018

== Notes ==
1.Paulson played Marcia Clark in The People v. O. J. Simpson: American Crime Story.
