= Chapter 6 (American Horror Story) =

- American Horror Story episode
- Episode no.: Season 6 Episode 6
- Directed by: Angela Bassett
- Written by: Ned Martel
- Production code: 6ATS06
- Original air date: October 19, 2016
- Running time: 41 minutes

Guest appearances
- Adina Porter as Lee Harris; Shannon Lucio as Diana Cross; William R. Moses as Frank; John Prosky as Production Legal Team

Episode chronology
← Previous "Chapter 5"	Next → "Chapter 7"
- American Horror Story: Roanoke

"Chapter 6" is the sixth episode of the sixth season of the anthology television series American Horror Story. It aired on October 19, 2016, on the cable network FX. The episode was written by Ned Martel and directed by Angela Bassett. One of the first major story arc changes of the series, the format of the series becomes a found footage horror depicting the aftermath of My Roanoke Nightmare and the development of a follow-up series, Return to Roanoke: Three Days in Hell.

== Plot ==
The events of Shelby and Matt's ordeal are turned into a hit TV show called My Roanoke Nightmare, which received over 23 million views by its finale. Eager to capitalize on the success of the series, executive producer Sidney Aaron James pitches a new idea for a follow-up series entitled, Return to Roanoke: Three Days in Hell. Sidney informs the network that he intends to bring the reenactors together with their real-life counterparts in the Roanoke house for three days during the Blood Moon. It is later revealed that his true intention for producing the follow-up is to expose Lee Harris as Mason's murderer and bring her to justice.

During production, the set of Return to Roanoke is plagued with gruesome incidents similar to the ones depicted in the original series. This leads Sidney to confront Agnes Mary Winstead, the actress who played Thomasin. Obsessed with the role, Agnes has attacked tourists in Hollywood while dressed as Thomasin and uprooted her life to move from Los Angeles to Roanoke. Sidney serves her with a restraining order, barring Agnes from further interaction with the show. As they leave, she lashes out at them while hysterically yelling in character as Thomasin before the orderly prevents her.

When the cast arrives, Sidney distributes cell phones with only the cameras enabled and tells them that they should use them to film. He leaves and tensions between all the participants begin to rise as the actors' personal issues come to the surface while questioning the truth of their real-life counterparts' stories. The tension is interrupted when Audrey Tindall, the British actress who originally played Shelby, is attacked by the Piggy Man while her husband, Rory Monahan, who played Edward Philippe Mott, is stabbed to death by the two nurses. Matt goes into the living room and sees that the word "Murder" has been completely spelled out. He relates what he found to the others, stating blankly that, "R is for Rory".

An intertitle reveals that during the three days, all but one of the participants died. The planned series never made it to air, and what remains is assembled from found footage.

== Reception ==
The episode was watched by 2.48 million people during its original broadcast, and gained a 1.4 ratings share among adults aged 18–49.

"Chapter 6" received largely positive reviews with much of the praise going towards the concept and Bassett's direction. It earned a 93% approval rating on Rotten Tomatoes, based on 15 reviews with an average score of 8.7/10. The critical consensus reads, "The promised surprise twist is revealed in "Chapter 6" of Roanoke, creating a solid – and even scarier – turn of events while splitting the season in two." Emily L. Stephens from The A.V. Club gave the episode an A rating, stating, ""Chapter 6" isn't just the best episode of the season so far; technically speaking, it ranks with the best-executed episodes of American Horror Story, period."
