= Colby French =

American actor

- Occupation: Actor

Colby French is an American television actor. He is best known for playing Hank on the NBC television drama Heroes, Yankee on The Suite Life of Zack & Cody, Captain Mike Murphy on 24, Captain Evan Thorn on Last Resort, and Officer Platt on the AMC television legal drama Better Call Saul.

== Filmography ==
Year	Title	Role	Notes
1997	Grosse Pointe Blank	Bartender	
2003	Ghosts of Genius	Dad	
2003	Bruce Almighty	Control Room Operator	
2005	Don't Tell	Lee	
2006	Stay	Ed	
2007	Wasting Away	Nick Steele	
2008	Changeling	Bob Clark	
2008	Eagle Eye	Console Tech #2	
2008	The Coverup	Officer Dodge	
2009	The Inner Circle	Ned Dugan	
2010	The Christmas Bunny	Scott Cooper	
2011	The Family Tree	Coach Sutton	
2014	10 Cent Pistol	Officer Jordan	
2014	Perseguidos pela morte	Gary	
2015	Pass the Light	Pete	
2017	12 Round Gun	Gary	
2018	Destroyer	Det. Kudra	
2018	The Black String	Mr. Marsh	

=== Television ===
Year	Title	Role	Notes
1997	Dangerous Minds	Male Officer	Episode: "Three Guns"
1999	Star Trek: Deep Space Nine	Ensign Weldon	Episode: "When It Rains..."
1999	The X-Files	Deputy	Episode: "Millennium"
2000	Pensacola: Wings of Gold	Capt. Craig Benedict	Episode: "Article 32"
2000	Angel	Tae	Episode: "She"
2000	Arliss	Carney Nuxall	Episode: "Creatures of Habit"
2001	ER	Greg Becton	Episode: "Survival of the Fittest"
2002	One on One	Reporter #2	Episode: "The Way You Make Me Feel"
2003–2004	Threat Matrix	Reporter/Journalist	10 episodes
2003	The Handler	Agent #1	Episode: "Body of Evidence"
2003	Miracles	Officer Damon Kelso	Episode: "Saint Debbie"
2003	Line of Fire	Ed Scott	Episode: "Boom, Swagger, Boom"
2004	The Practice	Richie Price	Episode: "Avenging Angels"
2004	24	Mike Murphy	Episode: "Day 3: 1:00 a.m.-2:00 a.m."
2004	Without a Trace	Lt. Cooper	Episode: "Gung-Ho"
2004	Entourage	Cop	Episode: "The Script and the Sherpa"
2004	Medical Investigation	Keith Jacobs	Episode: "Spiked"
2005	Medium	Sgt. David Chadway	Episode: "Lucky"
2005	Cold Case	Seth	Episode: "Ravaged"
2005	The Suite Life of Zack & Cody	Yankee	Episode: "Big Hair & Baseball"
2005	CSI: Crime Scene Investigation	Officer Davis	2 episodes
2006	Charmed	Chuck Pelham	Episode: "Mr. & Mrs. Witch"
2006	Big Love	Worker	Episode: "Home Invasion"
2006	The Unit	Welfare Man	Episode: "Change of Station"
2006	CSI: Miami	Gary Logan	Episode: "Death Eminent"
2006–2007	Heroes	Hank	4 episodes
2007; 2016	Bones	Daryl Patterson / Greg Braley	2 episodes
2007	Crossing Jordan	Tony Baron	Episode: "Dead Again"
2007	Shark	Carl Wilson	Episode: "Gangster Movies"
2007	Boston Legal	Officer Taylor Jessel	Episode: "No Brains Left Behind"
2009	Criminal Minds	Christopher Cole	Episode: "Minimal Loss"
2009	Castle	Detective	Episode: "Flowers for Your Grave"
2009	Lost	Uncle Doug	Episode: "The Incident: Part 1"
2009	True Blood	Frank	Episode: "Timebomb"
2009	The Forgotten	Jerry Powell	Episode: "River John"
2010	Law & Order: LA	Doug	Episode: "Playa Vista"
2011	The Chicago Code	Roger Kelly	4 episodes
2011	Prime Suspect	Dean	Episode: "Great Guy, Yet: Dead"
2011	Rizzoli & Isles	Skip Ryan	Episode: "Don't Stop Dancing, Girl"
2012	Longmire	Charlie Fielding	Episode: "Dog Soldier"
2012	Weeds	Father Three	Episode: "It's Time, Part 1"
2012	Major Crimes	John Jacob Felton	Episode: "The Shame Game"
2012	NCIS	Viggo Kiln	Episode: "Devil's Trifecta"
2013	Last Resort	Captain Evan Thorn	Episode: "Damn the Torpedoes"
2013	Hell on Wheels	Mike Malone	Episode: "It Happened in Boston"
2013	Hawaii Five-0	ATF Special Agent Blake Kennedy	Episode: "Ua Nalohia"
2013; 2016	The Fosters	Jim Pearson	2 episodes
2014	The Mentalist	Jason Kern	Episode: "Grey Water"
2014	Revolution	Joe Matthews	2 episodes
2014	Ray Donovan	Detective Todd Anderson	Episode: "Snowflake"
2015	Backstrom	Hank Altano	Episode: "Corkscrewed"
2015	CSI: Cyber	Robert Hart	Episode: "L0M1S"
2015	The Brink	Pilot	2 episodes
2015	How to Get Away with Murder	Barrett Nelson	Episode: "I Want You to Die"
2015	Transparent	Chrissy	Episode: "New World Coming"
2016	Roadies	Phil's Father	Episode: "The All Night Bus Ride"
2016	American Horror Story: Roanoke	Wilson Fisher (portraying Officer Connell)	4 episodes
2017	American Crime	Wilkens	Episode: "Season Three: Episode One"
2018–2019	9-1-1	Detective Andy Marks	2 episodes
2018	Better Call Saul	Officer Platt	Episode: "Something Stupid"
2019	NCIS: Los Angeles	Phillip Beckett	Episode: "Into the Breach"
2019	Pearson	Frank Cramer	2 episodes
2019-2020	Truth Be Told	Detective Hunter	3 episodes
2020	Little Fires Everywhere	Lou	4 episodes
2021	S.W.A.T.	Sam	Episode: "U-Turn"
2022	Dahmer – Monster: The Jeffrey Dahmer Story	Patrick Kennedy	6 episodes
