= List of horror television series with LGBTQ characters =

This is a list of horror television series (including web television and miniseries), which feature lesbian, gay, bisexual, queer and transgender characters. Non-binary, pansexual, asexual, intersexual, demisexual, graysexual, questioning and bi-curious characters are also included. The characters can be a main character, recurring character or a guest appearance. The orientation can be portrayed on-screen, described in the dialogue or mentioned. Besides the LGBT element, the criteria for inclusion on this list is the series genre or sub-genre being defined or described as: horror, comedy horror, drama-horror, folk horror, body horror, found footage, holiday horror, psychological horror, science fiction horror, slasher, supernatural horror, Gothic horror, natural horror, zombie horror, teen horror, evil and evil creatures, the afterlife, witches, vampires, werewolves, ghouls, ghosts, extraterrestrials, the supernatural, demons, the Devil, gore, torture, vicious animals, monsters, cannibalism, serial killers, paranormal and psychological thrillers, dystopian and apocalyptic worlds, psychopaths, cults, dark magic, Satanism and the macabre.

A selection of horror series notable for their diverse LGBT representation include: American Horror Story (over 60 LGBT characters across 10 seasons), Buffy the Vampire Slayer (featured the first lesbian sex scene on broadcast TV), Supernatural (the longest-running genre show in the history of American broadcast television), Teen Wolf (garnered attention from LGBT media for the attention it paid to the queer male gaze), True Blood (gained notoriety for its portrayal of vampires as the presumed stand-in for the LGBT community) and The Walking Dead (brought the horror genre into the television mainstream).

== List ==
Show	Network	Character	Actor	Notes	Year
The Alfred Hitchcock Hour	NBC	Nurse Betty Ames	T. C. Jones	Nurse Ames is a transvestite serial killer who preys specifically on nurses, in episode "An Unlocked Window". Broadcast in 1965.	1962–1965
American Horror Story: Murder House (Season one)	FX	Chad Warwick	Zachary Quinto	Chad and his partner Patrick are the former owners of the haunted house around which the first season centers.	2011
American Horror Story: Murder House (Season one)	FX	Patrick	Teddy Sears	Chad and his partner Patrick are the former owners of the haunted house around which the first season centers.	2011
American Horror Story: Murder House (Season one)	FX	Peggy	Kathleen Rose Perkins	Peggy is a lesbian and a friend of Chad.	2011
American Horror Story: Murder House (Season one)	FX	Elizabeth Short	Mena Suvari	Elizabeth is bisexual, and dreaming of becoming a famous actress in Hollywood.	2011
American Horror Story: Murder House (Season one)	FX	Moira O’Hara	Frances Conroy (old Moira)	Moira is bisexual and the housekeeper of Murder House. She has been there for the stay of many families. She was shot in the eye and killed in 1983, but that doesn't stop her from working there through 2011.	2011
American Horror Story: Murder House (Season one)	FX	Moira O’Hara	Alexandra Breckenridge (young Moira)	Moira is bisexual and the housekeeper of Murder House. She has been there for the stay of many families. She was shot in the eye and killed in 1983, but that doesn't stop her from working there through 2011.	2011
American Horror Story: Asylum (Season two)	FX	Lana Winters	Sarah Paulson	Lana is a lesbian reporter seeking to break a story in Briarcliff Asylum. She winds up being an inmate herself where she is subjected to gay conversion therapy.	2012
American Horror Story: Asylum (Season two)	FX	Marion	Joan Severance	Marion is a lesbian, and Lana's girlfriend. She appears to be a famous opera singer.	2012
American Horror Story: Asylum (Season two)	FX	Wendy Peyser	Clea DuVall	Wendy is a lesbian, and Lana's lover. She is a grade school teacher who is manipulated into having Lana committed to the asylum. She is eventually brutally murdered.	2012
American Horror Story: Coven (Season three)	FX	Quentin Fleming	Leslie Jordan	Quentin is a gay Witches' Council member.	2013
American Horror Story: Freak Show (Season four)	FX	Lucy Creb	Shauna Rappold	Lucy is bisexual. After having an affair with Alice, her husband murders her and Alice.	2014
American Horror Story: Freak Show (Season four)	FX	Stanley	Denis O'Hare	Stanley is a gay con artist who is often seen in the company of male sex workers such as Viking Hustler. Stanley also has a 13-inch penis.	2014
American Horror Story: Freak Show (Season four)	FX	Viking Hustler	Michael Murray	Viking Hustler is a male sex worker whose most frequent client is Stanley.	2014
American Horror Story: Freak Show (Season four)	FX	Dell Toledo	Michael Chiklis	Dell is bisexual, and has an affair with Andy, a gay hustler. He is the strongman of the freak show, and married to Desiree.	2014
American Horror Story: Freak Show (Season four)	FX	Andy	Matt Bomer	Andy is a gay sex worker who was murdered after cruising a gay bar.	2014
American Horror Story: Freak Show (Season four)	FX	Alice	Angela Sarafyan	Alice is a lesbian, and had an affair with Lucy. She and Lucy are murdered by Lucy's husband.	2014
American Horror Story: Hotel (Season five)	FX	Countess Elizabeth	Lady Gaga	Countess Elizabeth is a bisexual vampire. She owns the Hotel Cortez, and she's a ghost. She was shot and then beheaded.	2015
American Horror Story: Hotel (Season five)	FX	Ramona Royale	Angela Bassett	Ramona is a lesbian and one of Countess Elizabeth's many former lovers. She is a former film star that was turned by the Countess.	2015
American Horror Story: Hotel (Season five)	FX	Natacha Rambova	Alexandra Daddario	Natacha is bisexual and had a three-way relationship with the Countess and Rudolph Valentino. Her character is based on the real Natacha Rambova, Valentino's wife.	2015
American Horror Story: Hotel (Season five)	FX	F.W. Murnau	Henrik Rutgersson	F.W. Murnau is a gay film director who turned Valentino into a vampire.	2015
American Horror Story: Hotel (Season five)	FX	Will Drake	Cheyenne Jackson	Will is bisexual. He comes out to his young son.	2015
American Horror Story: Hotel (Season five)	FX	Tristan Duffy	Finn Wittrock	Tristan shares a kiss with Will Drake, and is also commanded by the Countess to sexually arouse Will, so she can have sex with him. Tristan has a sexual relationship with Liz Taylor as well, a trans woman.	2015
American Horror Story: Hotel (Season five)	FX	Liz Taylor	Denis O'Hare	Liz is a trans woman ghost, and works as a bartender and desk manager at the hotel.	2015
American Horror Story: Hotel (Season five)	FX	Sally McKenna	Sarah Paulson	Sally is bisexual and a ghost junkie turned blogger. She had a ménage à trois with two musicians, a man and a woman.	2015
American Horror Story: Hotel (Season five)	FX	Aileen Wuornos	Lily Rabe	Aileen is a bisexual prostitute and serial killer. She killed seven men in Florida between 1989 and 1990. Character is based on the real life Aileen Wuornos.	2015
American Horror Story: Hotel (Season five)	FX	Agnetha	Helena Mattsson	Agnetha and Vendela are Elizabeth's victims that later begin a polyamorous relationship together. They are also involved with a threesome with Mr. Wu and then John.	2015
American Horror Story: Hotel (Season five)	FX	Vendela	Kamilla Alves	Agnetha and Vendela are Elizabeth's victims that later begin a polyamorous relationship together. They are also involved with a threesome with Mr. Wu and then John.	2015
American Horror Story: Roanoke (Season six)	FX	Cricket Marlowe	Leslie Jordan	Ashley Gilbert is an actor who is playing Cricket Marlowe, a famous medium who finds missing children. Cricket flirts with a young Uber driver, asking him, "Tell me, young man, have you ever heard the term, 'gay for pay'?"	2016
American Horror Story: Roanoke (Season six)	FX	Ashley Gilbert	Leslie Jordan	Ashley Gilbert is an actor who is playing Cricket Marlowe, a famous medium who finds missing children. Cricket flirts with a young Uber driver, asking him, "Tell me, young man, have you ever heard the term, 'gay for pay'?"	2016
American Horror Story: Roanoke (Season six)	FX	Edward Philippe Mott	Evan Peters	Edward is gay, and a wealthy aristocratic nobleman. He left his wife for his lover Guinness.	2016
American Horror Story: Roanoke (Season six)	FX	Guinness	Henderson Wade	Guinness has a gay biracial relationship with Edward Philippe Mott, a wealthy 18th century eccentric.	2016
American Horror Story: Roanoke (Season six)	FX	Trixie Mattel	Trixie Mattel	In the series finale, Trixie, along with Edward Hansen, portrayed themselves for the faux 'My Roanoke Nightmare' PaleyFest panel. They conducted an interview with the real life Roanoke cast. Trixie is a drag queen and Edward is gay, and together they host a web series on YouTube reviewing episodes of the series. The writers of American Horror Story were fans of their show and wrote in a part for Trixie and Edward for the finale.	2016
American Horror Story: Roanoke (Season six)	FX	Edward Hansen	Edward Hansen	In the series finale, Trixie, along with Edward Hansen, portrayed themselves for the faux 'My Roanoke Nightmare' PaleyFest panel. They conducted an interview with the real life Roanoke cast. Trixie is a drag queen and Edward is gay, and together they host a web series on YouTube reviewing episodes of the series. The writers of American Horror Story were fans of their show and wrote in a part for Trixie and Edward for the finale.	2016
American Horror Story: Cult (Season seven)	FX	Ally Mayfair-Richards	Sarah Paulson	Ally is a lesbian, and a Michigan mother being driven insane by clowns, following Donald Trump's election.	2017
American Horror Story: Cult (Season seven)	FX	Ivy Mayfair-Richards	Allison Pill	Ivy is a lesbian, and Ally's wife.	2017
American Horror Story: Cult (Season seven)	FX	Winter Anderson	Billie Lourd	Winter is a lesbian, and was hired to be Ally and Ivy's nanny. She is cult leader Kai's sister. She has an affair with Ivy.	2017
American Horror Story: Cult (Season seven)	FX	Harrison Wilton	Billy Eichner	Harrison is gay, and in a relationship with Jack Samuels.	2017
American Horror Story: Cult (Season seven)	FX	Jack Samuels	Colton Haynes	Jack is gay and in a relationship with Harrison Wilton, and had a one-night stand with Kai Anderson.	2017
American Horror Story: Cult (Season seven)	FX	Kai Anderson	Evan Peters	Kai is the cult leader and had sexual intercourse with both Jack and Harrison.	2017
American Horror Story: Cult (Season seven)	FX	Bob Thompson	Dermot Mulroney	Bob is a network news anchor. He was into BDSM, and kept a male gimp hostage in his attic as his sex toy.	2017
American Horror Story: Cult (Season seven)	FX	Valerie Solanas	Lena Dunham	Valerie is the lesbian cult leader of SCUM (Society for Cutting Up Men), a murderous radical feminist cult. Character is based on the real life Valerie Solanas, famous for writing the SCUM Manifesto.	2017
American Horror Story: Cult (Season seven)	FX	Bebe Babbitt	Frances Conroy	Bebe is a lesbian, and Valerie's former girlfriend. She is also Kai's anger management counselor. She is part of Valerie's SCUM movement. She is eventually shot by Ally.	2017
American Horror Story: Cult (Season seven)	FX	Martha	Shondalia White	Martha is bisexual and an activist.	2017
American Horror Story: Cult (Season seven)	FX	Maurice	Ryan Alvarez	Maurice and Bruce are a gay couple associated with Valerie Solanas' SCUM cult. Valerie believes that Bruce is partly responsible for submitting, at least a couple, of the Zodiac letters to the newspapers, and after outing him to the cult, they brutally murder him. Maurice flees for his life.	2017
American Horror Story: Cult (Season seven)	FX	Bruce	Miguel Sagaz	Maurice and Bruce are a gay couple associated with Valerie Solanas' SCUM cult. Valerie believes that Bruce is partly responsible for submitting, at least a couple, of the Zodiac letters to the newspapers, and after outing him to the cult, they brutally murder him. Maurice flees for his life.	2017
American Horror Story: Cult (Season seven)	FX	Andy Warhol	Evan Peters	Andy Warhol is gay. The storyline involving Warhol is based on the real life attempted murder of Warhol on June 3, 1968, by Valerie Solanas.	2017
American Horror Story: Cult (Season seven)	FX	Erika	Annie Ilonzeh	Erika is a lesbian, and Ally's new girlfriend in the finale episode.	2017
American Horror Story: Apocalypse (Season eight)	FX	Mr. Gallant	Evan Peters	Mr. Gallant is gay, and throughout his life, his grandmother has tried to make him the perfect gay.	2018
American Horror Story: Apocalypse (Season eight)	FX	Andre Stevens	Jeffrey Bowyer-Chapman	Andre and Stu are a gay couple, and two of the survivors in the outpost. Stu gets shot by Mead (Kathy Bates) after she tampered with a Geiger counter to make it appear that he was contaminated. His body is then cooked into a stew, which is served to the unaware Purples.	2018
American Horror Story: Apocalypse (Season eight)	FX	Stu	Chad James Buchanan	Andre and Stu are a gay couple, and two of the survivors in the outpost. Stu gets shot by Mead (Kathy Bates) after she tampered with a Geiger counter to make it appear that he was contaminated. His body is then cooked into a stew, which is served to the unaware Purples.	2018
American Horror Story: Apocalypse (Season eight)	FX	Michael Langdon	Cody Fern	Michael is the anti-Christ and makes gay passes at Tate (Evan Peters).	2018
American Horror Story: Apocalypse (Season eight)	FX	Walter	Jason Michael Snow	Walter is a gay lawyer with an affinity for pleated khakis. He was a guest at a dinner party where Evie attempted to set up her grandson, Mr. Gallant, with eligible gay bachelors, in episode "The Morning After".	2018
American Horror Story: Apocalypse (Season eight)	FX	Morris	Navaris Darson	Morris is gay and owned like 14 dogs. He was a guest at a dinner party where Evie attempted to set up her grandson, Mr. Gallant, with eligible gay bachelors, in episode "The Morning After".	2018
American Horror Story: Apocalypse (Season eight)	FX	Mario Vestri	Chris Ferro	Mario is gay and a manager at Pottery Barn. He was a guest at a dinner party where Evie attempted to set up her grandson, Mr. Gallant, with eligible gay bachelors, in episode "The Morning After".	2018
American Horror Story: Apocalypse (Season eight)	FX	Elizabeth	Jennifer Jalene	Elizabeth and Grace are a lesbian couple. In a flashback, they were shown to be the new owners of Murder House. Not long after moving in, Michael Langdon stabbed them to death, binding their souls to the house. After they turn into ghosts, he then incinerated them, and made them cease to exist. This was later reversed when Mallory went back in time and killed Michael before he met Grace and Elizabeth.	2018
American Horror Story: Apocalypse (Season eight)	FX	Grace	Stacy Highsmith	Elizabeth and Grace are a lesbian couple. In a flashback, they were shown to be the new owners of Murder House. Not long after moving in, Michael Langdon stabbed them to death, binding their souls to the house. After they turn into ghosts, he then incinerated them, and made them cease to exist. This was later reversed when Mallory went back in time and killed Michael before he met Grace and Elizabeth.	2018
American Horror Story: 1984 (Season nine)	FX	Chet Clancy	Gus Kenworthy	Chet is bisexual and the jock of the group and a steroid user. During a conversation with Chef Bertie and Chet, she remarks to him, "it's not like I don't know you swing both ways", to which Chet replies, "what can I say, I'm an equal opportunity lover".	2019
American Horror Story: 1984 (Season nine)	FX	Xavier Plympton	Cody Fern	Xavier worked in gay pornography in hopes of furthering his acting career.	2019
American Horror Story: 1984 (Season nine)	FX	Blake	Todd Stashwick	Blake is a gay porn producer and Xavier's former employer.	2019
American Horror Story: 1984 (Season nine)	FX	Midge	Emma Meisel	Midge and Helen are having a threesome with male counselor Eddie before being killed.	2019
American Horror Story: 1984 (Season nine)	FX	Helen	Kat Solko	Midge and Helen are having a threesome with male counselor Eddie before being killed.	2019
American Horror Story: 1984 (Season nine)	FX	Limahl	Misha Crosby	Crosby portrays Limahl, the lead singer of the band Kajagoogoo. In the time frame of his appearance in the show, Limahl was still in the closet.	2019
American Horror Story: Double Feature (Season ten)	FX	Cal Cambon	Nico Greetham	Cal and Troy are part of a four-person friend group who were abducted and impregnated by aliens for an experiment conducted in Area 51, which is the central storyline of the second half of the season, subtitled Death Valley.	2021
American Horror Story: Double Feature (Season ten)	FX	Troy Lord	Isaac Cole Powell	Cal and Troy are part of a four-person friend group who were abducted and impregnated by aliens for an experiment conducted in Area 51, which is the central storyline of the second half of the season, subtitled Death Valley.	2021
American Horror Story: NYC (Season eleven)	FX	Patrick Read	Russell Tovey	Read and Barelli are gay and in a romantic relationship.	2022
American Horror Story: NYC (Season eleven)	FX	Gino Barelli	Joe Mantello	Read and Barelli are gay and in a romantic relationship.	2022
American Horror Story: NYC (Season eleven)	FX	Liz Taylor	Denis O'Hare	Taylor is transgender.	2022
American Horror Story: NYC (Season eleven)	FX	Fran Levinsky	Sandra Bernhard	Levinsky is a lesbian activist.	2022
Being Human (British series)	BBC Three	Carl	Steve John Shepherd	Carl is a gay vampire. He shares a flat with his human boyfriend Dan until he accidentally kills him.	
Being Human (British series)	BBC Three	Dan	Edward Franklin	Dan is gay and is accidentally killed by his vampire boyfriend.	
Being Human (North American series)	Syfy	Emily	Alison Louder	Emily is a lesbian and lead character Josh's (Sam Huntington) sister. She's cool with her brother being a werewolf.	2011–2014
Being Human (North American series)	Syfy	Jackie	Rhiannon Moller-Trotter	Jackie is a lesbian, and was Emily's girlfriend. They broke up after Jackie broke her arm.	2011–2014
Buffy the Vampire Slayer	WB; UPN	Willow Rosenberg	Alyson Hannigan	Willow is bisexual. While she was in a relationship with Daniel “Oz” Osbourne in seasons three to four, she later enters a relationship with Tara in season 4.	1997–2003
Buffy the Vampire Slayer	WB; UPN	Tara Maclay	Amber Benson	Tara is lesbian.	1997–2003
Buffy the Vampire Slayer	WB; UPN	Kennedy	Iyari Limon	Kennedy is lesbian. Introduced in season 7, she becomes involved with Willow.	1997–2003
Buffy the Vampire Slayer	WB; UPN	Andrew Wells	Tom Lenk	Andrew was confirmed to be gay by series creator Joss Whedon although it was never directly stated on-screen.	1997–2003
Buffy the Vampire Slayer	WB; UPN	Larry Blaisdell	Larry Bagby	Larry, Xander's bully from season one, tells Xander he's gay in season two.	1997–2003
Buffy the Vampire Slayer	WB; UPN	Scott Hope	Fab Filippo	Scott, a character in season three, is revealed to be gay in season seven.	1997–2003
Campamento Albanta	Atresplayer Premium	Carolina	Lucía Martín Abello	Carolina is a lesbian. She has a sexual relationship with Bego.	2020
Campamento Albanta	Atresplayer Premium	Bego	Laura Ledesma	Bego is a lesbian. She hooks up with Carolina.	2020
Campamento Albanta	Atresplayer Premium	Audrey	Javier Ruesga	Audrey is genderqueer. They are flamboyant and feminine.	2020
Campamento Albanta	Atresplayer Premium	Therapy Girl	Laura Corbacho	Therapy Girl is a trans woman, in a therapy group.	2020
Castle Rock	Hulu	Joy Wilkes	Elsie Fisher	Joy Wilkes is a lesbian. She has a relationship with Chance.	2018–2019
Castle Rock	Hulu	Chance	Abby Corrigan	Chance is a lesbian, and has a brief romance with Joy Wilkes.	2018–2019
Castlevania	Netflix	Morana	Yasmine Al Massri	Morana is a lesbian. She is one of the four Queens of Styria and a member of the Council of Sisters. She is probably thousands of years old. She and Striga have been together for a very long time.	2017-
Castlevania	Netflix	Striga	Ivana Miličević	Striga is a lesbian. She and Morana have been together for many years.	2017-
Chilling Adventures of Sabrina	Netflix	Theo Putnam	Lachlan Watson	Theo Putnam is a trans boy. He comes out in season two to his father.	2018–2020
Chilling Adventures of Sabrina	Netflix	Zelda Spellman	Miranda Otto	Zelda Spellman is pansexual. She is a witch who became the High Priestess of the Church of Night.	2018–2020
Chilling Adventures of Sabrina	Netflix	Mambo Marie LaFleur	Skye P. Marshall	Mambo Marie LaFleur is a pansexual voodoo witch.	2018–2020
Chilling Adventures of Sabrina	Netflix	Ambrose Spellman	Chance Perdomo	Ambrose Spellman is a pansexual warlock, and in a relationship with Luke Chalfant. He is one of Sabrina's partners in crime, always up for mischief.	2018–2020
Chilling Adventures of Sabrina	Netflix	Luke Chalfant	Darren Mann	Luke is a bisexual warlock and in a sexual relationship with Ambrose. He was also in an orgy with Ambrose, Nick, Prudence, and the witch sisters.	2018–2020
Chilling Adventures of Sabrina	Netflix	Nicholas Scratch	Gavin Leatherwood	Nicholas is bisexual. He is included in the orgy scene, and is referred to as an equal opportunity flirt, because of his flirting with both men and women.	2018–2020
Chilling Adventures of Sabrina	Netflix	Carl Tapper	Peter Bundic	Carl is a closeted gay and has lust feelings for his friend Billy.	2018–2020
Chilling Adventures of Sabrina	Netflix	Robin Goodfellow	Jonathan Whitesell	Robin is a queer hobgoblin with green hair. He and Theo are in a relationship in season 3.	2018–2020
Crazy Bitches (web series)	Tubi; Revry	Cassie	Cathy DeBuono	Cassie is a lesbian. She is an athlete and often rude. This web series is based on the 2014 film of the same name.	2019-
Crazy Bitches (web series)	Tubi; Revry	Eleni	Jessica Graham	Eleni is a bisexual meditation and yoga teacher.	2019-
Crazy Bitches (web series)	Tubi; Revry	Pandora	Mandahla Rose	Pandora is lesbian, and a social media influencer.	2019-
Crazy Bitches (web series)	Tubi; Revry	Rhea Alcott Thomas	Guinevere Turner	Rhea Alcott Thomas is a lesbian soap opera star who is at the ranch for a breather from her wife.	2019-
Crazy Bitches (web series)	Tubi; Revry	Teddi	Cathy DeBuono	Teddi is a lesbian. She is a massage and reiki master.	2019-
Crazy Bitches (web series)	Tubi; Revry	Izzy Thomas	Nayo Wallace	Izzy Thomas is a lesbian. She works for the soap opera that her wife, Rhea Alcott Thomas, stars in.	2019-
Creeped Out	CBBC; Family Channel	Mrs. Tuthill	Andrea Grant	In episode "Kindlesticks", Esme promises to babysit twins Sissy and Missy while their same-sex parents go out that night.	2017–
Creepshow	Shudder	Celia	Danielle Lyn	Celia is a lesbian. She is Lydia Layne's employee and lover.	2019-
Creepshow	Shudder	Lydia Layne	Tricia Helfer	Lydia Layne is a lesbian. She is a high powered CEO, and Celia's lover.	2019-
Curon	Netflix	Daria Raina	Margherita Morchio	Daria Raina is bisexual. She's inclined to violence and drinking.	2020=
Curon	Netflix	Micki Asper	Juju Di Domenico	Micki Asper is a lesbian. She has a relationship with Daria.	2020=
Damien	A&E	James Shay	David Meunier	James Shay is a gay police detective. Patrick might be his lover.	2016
Damien	A&E	Patrick	Michael Therriault	James Shay is a gay police detective. Patrick might be his lover.	2016
Dante's Cove	Here TV	Kevin Archer	Gregory Michael	Kevin Archer is gay, and Kevin's partner on the island is Toby Moraitis.	2005–2007
Dante's Cove	Here TV	Toby Moraitis	Charlie David	Toby Moraitis is gay. His partner on the island is Kevin Archer. Kavan Reece played Toby in the show's unaired pilot.	2005–2007
Dante's Cove	Here TV	Van	Nadine Nicole Heimann	Van is a lesbian. She was consumed by the idea of magic, and tried to wipe her girlfriend's memory of magic.	2005–2007
Dante's Cove	Here TV	Michelle	Jill Bennett	Michelle is a lesbian, and Van's girlfriend. She disapproved of magic.	2005–2007
Dante's Cove	Here TV	Brit	Michelle Wolff	Brit is a lesbian. She is a bartender and scuba instructor.	2005–2007
Dante's Cove	Here TV	Elena	Jenny Shimizu	Elena is a lesbian, and an antiquarian who is involved with Brit.	2005–2007
Dante's Cove	Here TV	Ambrosius Vallin	William Gregory Lee	Ambrosius Vallin is bisexual. He was caught by his fiancée, having sex with Raymond the Valet, and she placed a curse on him.	2005–2007
Dante's Cove	Here TV	Raymond the Valet	Dylan Jordan	Raymond the Valet is gay. He is caught having sex with Ambrosius Vallin.	2005–2007
Dante's Cove	Here TV	Tina	Rena Riffel	Tina is a lesbian. She was a former girlfriend of Van.	2005–2007
Dante's Cove	Here TV	Marco Laveau	Gabriel Romero	Marco Laveau is gay and owns the local bar. He has a crush on Toby and Kevin.	2005–2007
Dante's Cove	Here TV	Adam	Jon Fleming	Adam is gay, and Dante's Cove's resident party boy. He went to high school with Toby.	2005–2007
Dante's Cove	Here TV	Kai	German Santiago	Kai is gay. He has a hookup with Marco Laveau, in episode "The Solstice".	2005–2007
Dante's Cove	Here TV	Diana Childs	Thea Gill	Diana Childs is a lesbian. She is a witch trying to go back in time and save her family. She was insane and dangerous.	2005–2007
Dante's Cove	Here TV	Amber	Zara Taylor	Amber is a lesbian, and Chrissy's girlfriend.	2005–2007
Dante's Cove	Here TV	Chrissy	Michaela Mann	Chrissy is a lesbian, and Amer's girlfriend. Her only appearance was in the pilot episode.	2005–2007
Daybreak	Netflix	Wesley Fists	Austin Crute	Wesley Fists is a black queer self-styled rōnin, in a relationship with Turbo Pokaski.	2019
Daybreak	Netflix	Turbo Pokaski	Cody Kearsley	Turbo Pokaski is queer, and the unhinged leader of the Jocks, and Wesley Fists' boyfriend.	2019
Dead of Summer	Freeform	Drew Reeves	Zelda Williams	Drew Reeves is a bisexual trans man.	2016
Death Valley	MTV	Carla Rinaldi	Tania Raymonde	Carla Rinaldi is a lesbian. She makes out with barmaid Julia, in episode "Zombie Fights". She is a member of the Undead Task Force, which combats vampires, werewolves and zombies that mysteriously descended upon the streets of California's San Fernando Valley.	2011
Death Valley	MTV	Julia	Stacey LaBerge	Julia is bisexual. She is a bartender, and in a relationship with Carla Rinaldi.	2011
Devilman Crybaby	Netflix	Ryo Asuka (Satan)	Murase Ayumu (Japanese) Kyle McCarley (English)	Satan is an intersexual queer. They are displayed as an intersex being with breasts and male groin area.	2018
Devilman Crybaby	Netflix	Miki "Miko" Kuroda	Ami Koshimizu (Japanese) Cherami Leigh (English)	Miki "Miko" Kuroda is queer. She is part of the track team.	2018
Devilman Crybaby	Netflix	Moyuru Koda	Junya Hirano (Japanese) Bryce Papenbrook (English)	Moyuru Koda is gay. He is part of the track team. He was in love with one of his teammates and childhood friends, Junichi.	2018
Dominion	Syfy	Uriel	Katrine De Candole	Uriel is lesbian.	2014–2015
Dominion	Syfy	Arika	Shivani Ghai	Arika is lesbian.	2014–2015
Dominion	Syfy	Daria	Florence Kasumba	Daria is lesbian.	2014–2015
Dracula	NBC	Lord Laurent	Anthony Howell	Lord Laurent is involved in a secret gay love affair with Daniel Davenport.	2013–2014
Dracula	NBC	Daniel Davenport	Lewis Rainer	Daniel is involved in a secret gay love affair with Lord Laurent, which Dracula finds out about when he visits a secret gay club.	2013–2014
Dracula	NBC	Lucy Westenra	Katie McGrath	Lucy is a rich lesbian society girl in love with Mina Murray (Jessica De Gouw).	2013–2014
Dracula	NBC	Jayne Wetherby	Victoria Smurfit	Jayne is bisexual, and had a sexual relationship with Lucy.	2013–2014
The Exorcist	FOX	Katherine Rance	Brianne Howey	Kat Rance is lesbian.	2016–2017
The Exorcist	FOX	Father Marcus Keane	Ben Daniels	Father Marcus Keane is bisexual. In response to backlash from homophobic fans offended by a gay kiss between characters Father Marcus Keane and Peter Morrow, showrunner Jeremy Slater said this to the homophobes: "Good, fuck you. I'm glad you didn't like it, I'm glad it ruined the show for you. You shouldn't have good things in your life."	2016–2017
The Exorcist	FOX	Verity	Brianna Hildebrand	Verity is a lesbian.	2016–2017
The Exorcist	FOX	Peter Morrow	Christopher Cousins	Peter Morrow is gay.	2016–2017
The Exorcist	FOX	Julia	Charlotte Thomas	Julia is a lesbian.	2016–2017
The Following	Fox	Paul Torres	Adan Canto	Paul and Jacob are initially introduced in season 1 as Bill and Willy, gay neighbors of Sarah. This is soon revealed as a ruse, in the belief that Sarah would perceive gay neighbors as non-threatening. Both before and after they broke cover the pair were sexually involved but both characters were killed before the full extent of their relationship was clarified.	2013–2015
The Following	Fox	Jacob Wells	Nico Tortorella	Paul and Jacob are initially introduced in season 1 as Bill and Willy, gay neighbors of Sarah. This is soon revealed as a ruse, in the belief that Sarah would perceive gay neighbors as non-threatening. Both before and after they broke cover the pair were sexually involved but both characters were killed before the full extent of their relationship was clarified.	2013–2015
The Following	Fox	Gina Mendez	Valerie Cruz	Gina is a lesbian FBI Special Agent.	2013–2015
The Following	Fox	Jana Murphy	Leslie Bibb	Jana is Mendez's ex-wife, and a former FBI agent.	2013–2015
The Following	Fox	Dawn	Kristen Bush	Dawn is Gina Mendez's new wife.	2013–2015
From Dusk till Dawn	El Rey	Santanico Pandemonium	Eiza González	Santanico Pandemonium is bisexual.	2014–2016
From Dusk till Dawn	El Rey	Manola Jimenez	Gabrielle Walsh	Manola Jimenez is lesbian.	2014–2016
Ghost Wars	SyFy	Marilyn McGrath-Dufresne	Kristin Lehman	Marilyn McGrath-Dufresne is a lesbian, and married to Valerie "Val" McGrath-Dufresne. She is the town doctor.	2017–2018
Ghost Wars	SyFy	Val McGrath-Dufresne	Luvia Petersen	Val McGrath-Dufresne is a lesbian, and married to Marilyn McGrath-Dufresne. She is the town mayor.	2017–2018
Hannibal	NBC	Hannibal Lecter	Mads Mikkelsen	Hannibal Lecter is omnisexual (according to series creator Bryan Fuller) and is in love with Will Graham.	2013–2015
Hannibal	NBC	Will Graham	Hugh Dancy	Will is heterosexual but demonstrates the feelings are mutual, replying to Bedelia's question of whether he reciprocates or not in the last episode of season 3. Since the inception of the show Fuller has repeatedly referred to the series as a love story between the two men; in addition to this he has confirmed that their relationship is one of mutual attraction.	2013–2015
Hannibal	NBC	Margot Verger	Katharine Isabelle	Margot Verger, introduced in season two, is a lesbian.	2013–2015
Hannibal	NBC	Alana Bloom	Caroline Dhavernas	Alana Bloom, who is bisexual, begins a relationship with Margot in season three, and they eventually marry and have a son, Morgan.	2013–2015
Hannibal	NBC	Francis Dolarhyde	Richard Armitage	Even though Francis Dolarhyde dates Reba McClane during the series, on his ledger he claims to be interested in establishing a romantic relationship with Hannibal by writing "I am so eager to please you to be your friend your lover perhaps".	2013–2015
Hannibal	NBC	Jimmy Price	Scott Thompson	Jimmy Price is openly gay, according to Bryan Fuller. Actor Scott Thompson was quoted as saying about his character: "To be honest, I don't think there was sexuality. There was no sexuality to Jimmy, really. If there was, it was people projecting it onto him. But in terms of actually being written into the character, I don't think it's really part of him almost at all. I'll never play Jimmy gay."	2013–2015
Happy Sugar Life	JNN	Satō Matsuzaka	Hanazawa Kana	Satō Matsuzaka is pansexual. Series description: This is a pure love psycho horror story of a girl named Satou Matsuzaka. She commits crimes, steals and kills.	2018
Happy Sugar Life	JNN	Shio Kōbe	Kuno Misaki	Shio Kōbe is a lesbian. She lives at Satō's apartment. She is not allowed outside of the apartment.	2018
Happy Sugar Life	JNN	Satō's Aunt	Inoue Kikuko	Satō's Aunt is pansexual. She is mentally unstable and deeply insane. In the final episode, she is arrested for arson and first degree murder.	2018
The Haunting of Bly Manor	Netflix	Danielle "Dani" Clayton	Victoria Pedretti	Dani is lesbian. Dani and Jamie have a romantic relationship.	2020–
The Haunting of Bly Manor	Netflix	Jamie Taylor	Amelia Eve	Jamie is lesbian. Dani and Jamie have a romantic relationship.	2020–
The Haunting of Hill House	Netflix	Theodora "Theo" Crain	Kate Siegel	Theodora Crain and Trish Park are a lesbian couple.	2018–
The Haunting of Hill House	Netflix	Theodora "Theo" Crain	Mckenna Grace (young Theo)	Theodora Crain and Trish Park are a lesbian couple.	2018–
The Haunting of Hill House	Netflix	Trish Park	Levy Tran	Theodora Crain and Trish Park are a lesbian couple.	2018–
The Haunting of Hill House	Netflix	Stacey	Katie Carpenter	Stacey is bisexual. She and Theo had sex at a wedding reception.	2018–
Hex	Arena; Sky One	Thelma Bates	Jemima Rooper	Thelma is a lesbian, and gave her life to save Cassie, who she had a crush on. When Cassie dies, they finally get together as ghosts.	2004–2005
Hex	Arena; Sky One	Maya Robertson	Laura Donnelly	Maya is a lesbian, and is killed after being hit by a car.	2004–2005
Hex	Arena; Sky One	Tom Wright	Samuel Collings	Tom is secretly gay and in love with Leon.	2004–2005
Hemlock Grove	Netflix	Brooke Bluebell	Lorenza Izzo	Brooke is a lesbian. In the pilot episode, Brooke has an affair with her female science teacher Mrs. Banks.	2013–2015
Hemlock Grove	Netflix	Mrs. Banks	Jennifer Gidson	Mrs. Banks is a bisexual teacher, and was having an affair with Brooke, a student.	2013–2015
Hemlock Grove	Netflix	Clementine Chasseur	Kandyse McClure	Clementine is a lesbian, and a former Marine and US Fish & Wildlife Officer.	2013–2015
Hemlock Grove	Netflix	Johann Pryce	Joel de la Fuente	Johann is gay, and tells his sex partner in a gay sex club why he likes having sex in the dark: after his father tortured him for not playing the piano well enough, he would lock him in a dark cupboard, eventually he locked his father in the cupboard.	2013–2015
Hemlock Grove	Netflix	Destiny Rumancek	Tiio Horn	Destiny is a bisexual psychic, she did not see her own death coming.	2013–2015
High-Rise Invasion	Netflix	Yuri Honjō	Haruka Shiraishi (Japanese) Suzie Yeung (English)	Yuri Honjō is a lesbian. She was mysteriously transported into a strange world filled with high-rise buildings where she is chased by killers wearing white masks.	2019-
High-Rise Invasion	Netflix	Mayuko Nise	Akira Sekine (Japanese) Stephanie Sheh (English)	Mayuko Nise is a lesbian. She is one of the people transported to the mysterious skyscraper world.	2019-
Inhuman Condition	KindaTV	Michelle Kessler	Torri Higginson	Dr. Michelle Kessler is bisexual and a therapist. She treats werewolves, zombies, and other creatures with frightening powers that live among us, because they need therapy too.	2016
Inhuman Condition	KindaTV	Rachel Kessler	Angela Asher	Rachel Kessler is a lesbian, and Michelle Kessler's ex-wife.	2016
Into the Dark: Midnight Kiss	Hulu	Cameron	Augustus Prew	In season 2, episode 4, "Midnight Kiss", a holiday horror themed episode that takes place on New Year's Eve, a group of gay friends get together at a remote house for the holiday weekend and find themselves being picked off, one by one, by a masked murderer. Cameron is gay. He is dating Joel, but he's slept his way through most of the group.	2018-
Into the Dark: Midnight Kiss	Hulu	Joel	Scott Evans	Joel is gay and has a real chip on his shoulder. He's committed to Cameron, but definitely takes him for granted. Joel nearly meets his end by some deviously placed fireworks, but survives the night.	2018-
Into the Dark: Midnight Kiss	Hulu	Zachary	Chester Lockhart	Zachary is gay and the group's foppish friend who's super concerned with fashion, status, and keeping up appearances. Zachary is killed by a broken champagne bottle used in a deeply disturbing fashion.	2018-
Into the Dark: Midnight Kiss	Hulu	Logan	Lukas Gage	Logan is gay and the meekest member of the group of friends. He has an obsessive crush on Cameron.	2018-
Into the Dark: Midnight Kiss	Hulu	Dante	Adam Faison	Dante is gay and an outsider to the group of friends. Cameron spots him at a nightclub and brings him along for the weekend.	2018-
In the Flesh	BBC Three	Kieren Walker	Luke Newberry	Kieren is gay, and a PDS sufferer (Partially Deceased Syndrome) who has come back to life. He committed suicide after his boyfriend Rick died in Afghanistan.	2013–2014
In the Flesh	BBC Three	Rick Macy	David Walmsley	Rick is Kieren's former gay lover, killed in Afghanistan.	2013–2014
In the Flesh	BBC Three	Simon Monroe	Emmett J Scanlan	Simon is gay and in the second season, Simon and Kieren become a couple.	2013–2014
Jade of Death	YouTube	Jade	Bernie Van Tiel	Jade is a lesbian. She can hear when and how people are going to die. When she finds her mother murdered, she runs away from home and gets a job at a seedy freak show carnival as the "Fortune-Teller of Death".	2018
Jade of Death	YouTube	Maya	Jordan Cowan	Maya is a lesbian. She works at the same freak show carnival as Jade, portraying a fairy at the haunted house.	2018
Interview with the Vampire	AMC	Louis de Pointe du Lac	Jacob Anderson	Louis de Pointe du Lac is a gay vampire.	2022
Interview with the Vampire	AMC	Lestat de Lioncourt	Sam Reid	Lestat de Lioncourt is a bisexual vampire with various romantic partners.	2022
Interview with the Vampire	AMC	Jonah	Thomas Antony Olajide	Jonah is a gay soldier. He has a sexual relationship with Louis.	2022
Interview with the Vampire	AMC	Armand	Assad Zaman	Armand is a gay vampire.	2022
Interview with the Vampire	AMC	Nicolas de Lenfent	Joseph Potter	Nicolas is gay, and a former friend and lover of Lestat.	2022
Interview with the Vampire	AMC	Claudia	Bailey Bass (season 1) & Delainey Hayles (season 2 - present).	Claudia is a lesbian vampire. She begins a brief but intense love affair with Madeleine.	2022
Interview with the Vampire	AMC	Madeleine Éparvier	Roxane Duran	Madeleine is a lesbian seamstress-turned-vampire.	2022
Jekyll	BBC One	Miranda Calendar	Meera Syal	Miranda is a lesbian private investigator.	2007
Jekyll	BBC One	Min	Fenella Woolgar	Min is Miranda's partner and is having their baby.	2007
The Lair	Here TV	Damian Courtenay	Peter Stickles	Damian Courtenay is a gay vampire, and leader of a vampire coven. He owns The Lair, a gay nightclub.	2007–2009
The Lair	Here TV	Thom Etherton	David Moretti	Thom Etherton is a gay human, and a reporter for a local newspaper. His boyfriend is Jonathan.	2007–2009
The Lair	Here TV	Colin	Dylan Vox	Colin is a gay vampire and Damian's second in command.	2007–2009
The Lair	Here TV	Frankie	Brian Nolan	Frankie is a gay human, and The Lair's janitor.	2007–2009
The Lair	Here TV	Jonathan	Jesse Cutlip	Jonathan is a gay human, and Thom's boyfriend.	2007–2009
The Lair	Here TV	Ian	Matty Ferraro	Ian is a young gay werewolf.	2007–2009
The Lair	Here TV	Laura Rivers	Beverly Lynne	Laura Rivers is a lesbian. She is Thom's best friend and co-worker.	2007–2009
The Lair	Here TV	Frau Von Hess	Sybil Danning	Frau Von Hess is a lesbian vampire. She wants revenge on Damian.	2007–2009
The League of Gentlemen	BBC Two	Barbara Dixon	Steve Pemberton (voice actor) Paul Hays-Marshall (portrayed by)	Barbara Dixon is a trans woman, and is the proprietor of Bab's Cabs. She drives a pink taxi. Barbara insists that her customers use gender neutral pronouns, and if they don't comply, they are ejected - often to their death.	1999-2002
Legion	FX	Lenny Busker	Aubrey Plaza	Lenny Busker at first glance appears to be a lesbian, but in a gender bending twist, she's also a 50 year old straight male, who's a recovering drug addict at a mental institution.	2017-
Legion	FX	Clark	Hamish Linklater	Clark is not a "gay character," instead, he's a "character who happens to be gay." He is married to Daniel, and they have a son.	2017-
Legion	FX	Daniel	Keir O'Donnell	Daniel is gay and married to Clark.	2017-
Love, Death & Robots	Netflix	Jennifer	Hayley McLaughlin	Jennifer is bisexual. She is paid to seduce and kill Sonnie.	2019-
Love, Death & Robots	Netflix	Sonnie	Helen Sadler	Sonnie is pansexual. She is a beastie fighter.	2019-
Lovecraft Country	HBO	Frida Kahlo	Camila Canó-Flaviá	Frida Kahlo is bisexual, and a Mexican painter. Josephine Baker makes out with Frida Kahlo on a couch.	2020-
Lovecraft Country	HBO	Yahima	Monique Candelaria	Yahima is an intersex two-spirit person. Ze is an indigenous character, originating from a Caribbean Arawak tribe. Ze has the knowledge others will do anything to possess.	2020-
Lovecraft Country	HBO	Josephine Baker	Carra Patterson	Josephine Baker is bisexual, she makes out with Frida Kahlo on a couch.	2020-
Lovecraft Country	HBO	Ms. Osberta (Bertie)	Carol Sutton	Bertie is bisexual. After her husband dies, she and Ethel become a couple.	2020-
Lovecraft Country	HBO	Montrose Freeman	Michael K. Williams	Montrose Freeman is queer. His lover is Sammy, the owner of the bar where Montrose often drinks.	2020-
Lovecraft Country	HBO	Sammy	Jon Hudson Odom	Sammy is gay, and owner of the bar where Montrose Freeman, his lover, frequently drinks.	2020-
Midnight, Texas	NBC	Joe Strong	Jason Lewis	Joe Strong is a tattoo artist, and a gay guardian angel.	2017–2018
Midnight, Texas	NBC	Chuy Strong	Bernardo Saracino	Chuy is half-demon and Joe's husband.	2017–2018
Midnight, Texas	NBC	Walker Chisum	Josh Kelly	Walker Chisum is a gay demon hunter.	2017–2018
Monsterland	Hulu	Kate Feldman	Taylor Schilling	Kate Feldman is a lesbian, and the wife of Shawn. They met in law school. Kate has dealt with ongoing mental illness issues for their entire relationship, featured in episode "Plainfield, IL".	2020
Monsterland	Hulu	Shawn Greene	Roberta Colindrez	Shawn Greene is a lesbian, and the wife of Kate Feldman. She is a lawyer, and dedicated to taking care of her wife.	2020
Motherland: Fort Salem	Freeform	Raelle Collar	Taylor Hickson	Raelle Collar is a lesbian witch. She enlists at Fort Salem, and wants to fight and die for the cause.	2020-
Motherland: Fort Salem	Freeform	Scylla Ramshorn	Amalia Holm	Scylla Ramshorn is a bisexual. She is a second-year cadet at Fort Salem whom Raelle falls for.	2020-
Nightflyers	SyFy	Lommie Thorne	Maya Eshet	Lommie Thorne is gender fluid. She is a cyber technician specialist who prefers to interface with computers more than humans. Lommie has a brief relationship with Melantha Jhirl.	2018
Nightflyers	SyFy	Melantha Jhirl	Jodie Turner-Smith	Melantha Jhirl is bisexual. She is a genetically enhanced cadet from the Genetic Space Program. Melantha Jhirl has a brief relationship with Lommie.	2018
The Order	Netflix	Lilith Bathory	Devery Jacobs	Lilith Bathory is bisexual. She is a student at Belgrave University and a member of the Knights of Saint Christopher.	2019-2020
The Order	Netflix	Nicole Birch	Anesha Bailey	Nicole Birch is a lesbian. She is a member of The Hermetic Order of the Blue Rose.	2019-2020
The Originals	The CW	Josh Rosza	Steven Krueger	Josh is a newly turned vampire and openly gay.	2013–2018
The Originals	The CW	Aiden	Colin Woodell	Aiden is gay and a werewolf. In Season 2, he and Josh date.	2013–2018
The Originals	The CW	Tristan de Martel	Oliver Ackland	Tristan is bisexual.	2013–2018
The Originals	The CW	Eddie	Keahu Kahuanui	Eddie is Josh's boyfriend in season 4.	2013–2018
The Originals	The CW	Keelin	Christina Moses	Keelin is bisexual and a werewolf. She is the last of her clan, and becomes gradually involved with Freya.	2013–2018
The Originals	The CW	Freya Mikaelson	Riley Voelkel	Freya is bisexual and a witch.	2013–2018
Passage (2019 webseries)	Tello Films	Ali Prader	Shannan Leigh Reeve	Ali Prader is queer. She's a specialist in a top secret government force that deals with the paranormal. She has the ability to speak with ghosts and other supernatural things.	2019-
Passage (2019 webseries)	Tello Films	Diana Atwell	Mandahla Rose	Diana Atwell is a lesbian. She is a tech-specialist with the top secret government force.	2019-
Passage (2019 webseries)	Tello Films	Kate Prader	Nicole Pacent	Kate Prader is a lesbian. She is Ali's dead wife, whom she can still see.	2019-
Penny Dreadful	Showtime	Dorian Gray	Reeve Carney	Dorian Gray is bisexual.	2014–2016
Penny Dreadful	Showtime	Ethan Chandler	Josh Hartnett	Ethan Chandler is a bisexual werewolf.	2014–2016
Penny Dreadful	Showtime	Ferdinand Lyle	Simon Russell Beale	Ferdinand Lyle is gay.	2014–2016
Penny Dreadful	Showtime	Angelique	Jonny Beauchamp	Angelique is transgender.	2014–2016
Penny Dreadful	Showtime	Brona Croft	Billie Piper	Brona Croft is bisexual.	2014–2016
Penny Dreadful	Showtime	Justine	Jessica Barden	Justine is bisexual.	2014–2016
Preacher	AMC	Proinsias Cassidy	Joseph Gilgun	Proinsias Cassidy is bisexual.	2016–2019
Preacher	AMC	Eccarius	Adam Croasdell	Eccarius is bisexual.	2016–2019
The Purge	USA	Jenna Betancourt	Hannah Anderson	Jenna is married to Rick, they were in a polyamorous relationship with Lila. Jenna and Lila reconnect at a pro-Purge party. Rick and Jenna eventually leave the party after being warned the party is about to be broken up. Lila follows them home whilst being chased by a killer. Rick and Jenna let her in, and Lila tries to kill Rick so she and Jenna can be together - Jenna kills her to save Rick.	2018–
The Purge	USA	Lila Stanton	Lili Simmons	Jenna is married to Rick, they were in a polyamorous relationship with Lila. Jenna and Lila reconnect at a pro-Purge party. Rick and Jenna eventually leave the party after being warned the party is about to be broken up. Lila follows them home whilst being chased by a killer. Rick and Jenna let her in, and Lila tries to kill Rick so she and Jenna can be together - Jenna kills her to save Rick.	2018–
The Purge	USA	Rick Betancourt	Colin Woodell	Jenna is married to Rick, they were in a polyamorous relationship with Lila. Jenna and Lila reconnect at a pro-Purge party. Rick and Jenna eventually leave the party after being warned the party is about to be broken up. Lila follows them home whilst being chased by a killer. Rick and Jenna let her in, and Lila tries to kill Rick so she and Jenna can be together - Jenna kills her to save Rick.	2018–
Ratched	Netflix	Mildred Ratched	Sarah Paulson	Mildred is bisexual, and a nurse at fictional Lucia State Hospital psychiatric asylum. She has sexual relations with a private detective staying at her motel. Then after meeting Gwedolyn Briggs, they start dating in secret.	2020–
Ratched	Netflix	Gwendolyn Briggs	Cynthia Nixon	Gwedolyn is a lesbian, and personal assistant to the Governor. She becomes interested in Mildred and takes her to a lesbian bar. They later start dating.	2020–
Ratched	Netflix	Ingrid	Harriet Sansom Harris	Ingrid is staying at the hospital for depression. She undergoes a lobotomy which has the unintended side-effect of bringing out lesbian desires. They then use hydrotherapy to try to cure her lesbianism.	2020–
Ratched	Netflix	Lily Cartwright	Annie Starke	Lily is a lesbian, being treated at the hospital for her lesbianism. She is given a lobotomy and when that doesn't work, undergoes hydrotherapy.	2020–
The Returned	Canal+	Julie Meyer	Céline Sallette	Julie is a lesbian and a nurse, who survived an attack by a serial killer. She is very protective of a small boy who follows her home.	2012–2015
The Returned	Canal+	Laure Valère	Alix Poisson	Laure is a lesbian and police lieutenant. She is Julie's former partner.	2012–2015
Ripper Street	BBC One	Fred Best	David Dawson	Fred is a closeted gay newspaper reporter. His secret lover is Harry.	2012–2016
Ripper Street	BBC One	David Goodbody	Alfie Stewart	David and Vincent are lovers, dreaming of running away to a better life together. They are telegram delivery boys, with a side hustle of being rent boys. They are involved in a scheme to blackmail their clients, and if they don't pay, the pair will expose them. In series 2, episode "Threads of Silk and Gold", inspired by the Cleveland Street scandal. The time frame of the series is when homosexuality was illegal in Britain.	2012–2016
Ripper Street	BBC One	Vincent Featherwell	Jassa Ahluwalia	David and Vincent are lovers, dreaming of running away to a better life together. They are telegram delivery boys, with a side hustle of being rent boys. They are involved in a scheme to blackmail their clients, and if they don't pay, the pair will expose them. In series 2, episode "Threads of Silk and Gold", inspired by the Cleveland Street scandal. The time frame of the series is when homosexuality was illegal in Britain.	2012–2016
Ripper Street	BBC One	Solomon Quint	Scott Handy	Solomon is a closeted gay banker, being blackmailed by David and Vincent. He is secretly in love with David.	2012–2016
Ripper Street	BBC One	Otto Roberts	David Crowley	Otto is gay and also a telegram delivery boy. Otto is murdered by a man, believing Otto to be David.	2012–2016
Ripper Street	BBC One	Harry Collins	Dale Leadon Bolger	Harry is gay, a rent boy, and also a telegram delivery boy. He is Fred Best's secret lover.	2012–2016
The Sandman	Netflix	The Corinthian	Boyd Holbrook	The Corinthian is a Nightmare created by Dream that went rogue and started killing humans, against the orders of Dream. The Corinthian has a preference for eating the eyes of young men and/or sleeping with them.	2022-
The Sandman	Netflix	Johanna Constantine	Jenna Coleman	Johanna is a bisexual magician who deals in the Occult. In episode 3, Dream comes to her because she has his Sand, and she tells him that she left it at her ex-girlfriend's apartment, whom she left 6 months prior, but still has feelings for.	2022-
The Sandman	Netflix	Judy	Daisy Head	Judy is a frequent customer at the 24-hour diner in episode 5. She comes in after a fight with her girlfriend Donna the previous night, trying to get in contact with her.	2022-
The Sandman	Netflix	Alex Burgess	Laurie Kynaston	Alex is the 2nd son of Roderick Burgess, the magician who imprisons Dream in 1916. In episode 1, he falls in love with Paul and they remain together until 2020, when Paul helps Dream escape.	2022-
The Sandman	Netflix	Desire of the Endless	Mason Alexander Park	Desire is one of the seven Endless, the anthropomorphic embodiment of desire, sibling of Dream. They have no gender, and go by all pronouns.	2022-
The Sandman	Netflix	Lucifer Morningstar	Gwendoline Christie	Lucifer is a fallen angel from Heaven, and ruler of Hell. They have no sex or gender, and are androgynous.	2022-
Scream	MTV; VH1	Audrey Jensen	Bex Taylor-Klaus	Audrey Jensen is bisexual.	2015–
Scream	MTV; VH1	Rachel Murray	Sosie Bacon	Rachel Murray is a lesbian.	2015–
Scream	MTV; VH1	Gina McLane	Zena Grey	Gina McLane is a lesbian, and Audrey's girlfriend.	2015–
Scream	MTV; VH1	Manny	Giullian Yao Gioiello	Manny is a gay high school student.	2015–
Scream	MTV; VH1	Zoë Vaughn	Kiana Lede	Zoë Vaughn is bisexual.	2015–
Shadowhunters	Freeform	Alec Lightwood	Matthew Daddario	Alec is gay. During season 1 he struggles with his attraction to men, especially after he meets Magnus, but eventually comes out as gay by kissing Magnus in front of his family. The two enter a serious relationship.	2016–2019
Shadowhunters	Freeform	Magnus Bane	Harry Shum, Jr.	Magnus is openly bisexual and a High Warlock.	2016–2019
Shadowhunters	Freeform	Raphael Santiago	David Castro	Raphael is asexual and a vampire.	2016–2019
Shadowhunters	Freeform	Meliorn	Jade Hassouné	Meliorn is bisexual.	2016–2019
Shadowhunters	Freeform	Olivia (Ollie) Wilson	Alexandra Ordolis	Olivia is an out lesbian.	2016–2019
Shadowhunters	Freeform	Samantha	Tara Joshi	Samantha is Ollie's girlfriend.	2016–2019
Shadowhunters	Freeform	Aline Penhallow	Eileen Li (season 2) Jacky Lai (season 3)	Aline is a closeted lesbian.	2016–2019
Shadowhunters	Freeform	Helen Blackthorn	Sydney Meyer	Helen is bisexual.	2016–2019
Shadowhunters	Freeform	Underhill	Steve Byers	Underhill is gay.	2016–2019
Siberia	NBC	Annie	Anne-Marie Mueschke	Annie is a lesbian, and has a crush on Natalie. She is shot by Russian Black-Ops soldiers.	2013
Siberia	NBC	Natalie	Natalie Scheetz	Natalie is bisexual. She was found dead in the woods after leaving Annie.	2013
Slasher: The Executioner	Super Channel; Netflix	Robin Turner	Christopher Jacot	Robin Turner and Justin Faysal are both gay and they are married.	2016–
Slasher: The Executioner	Super Channel; Netflix	Justin Faysal	Mark Ghanimé	Robin Turner and Justin Faysal are both gay and they are married.	2016–
Slasher: The Executioner	Super Channel; Netflix	Debbie	Jo Vannicola	Debbie is a lesbian.	2016–
Slasher: The Executioner	Super Channel; Netflix	Linda	Helen King	Linda is a lesbian, and her partner is Debbie.	2016–
Slasher: Guilty Party	Super Channel; Netflix	Antoine	Christopher Jacot	Antoine is gay.	2016–
Slasher: Guilty Party	Super Channel; Netflix	Renée	Joanne Vannicola	Renée is a lesbian.	2016–
Slasher: Solstice	Super Channel; Netflix	Angel Lopez	Salvatore Antonio	Angel Lopez is a gay activist who has a secret affair with Joe Lickers.	2016–
Slasher: Solstice	Super Channel; Netflix	Joe Lickers	Ilan Muallem	Joe Lickers is bisexual, and having a secret affair with Angel Lopez.	2016–
Slasher: Solstice	Super Channel; Netflix	Amber Ciotti	Joanne Vannicola	Amber Ciotti and Justine Rijkers are a lesbian couple.	2016–
Slasher: Solstice	Super Channel; Netflix	Justine Rijkers	Patrice Goodman	Amber Ciotti and Justine Rijkers are a lesbian couple.	2016–
Slasher: Solstice	Super Channel; Netflix	Kit Jennings	Robert Cormier	Kit is bisexual.	2016–
Slasher: Solstice	Super Channel; Netflix	Amy Chao	Rosie Simon	Amy Chao is asexual.	2016–
The Strain	FX	Dutch Velders	Ruta Gedmintas	Dutch Velders is bisexual.	2014–2017
The Strain	FX	Nikki	Nicola Correia-Damude	Nikki is lesbian.	2014–2017
Supermax	Rede Globo	Janette	Maria Clara Spinelli	Janette is a trans woman. She owns a chain of beauty salons. She had a miserable childhood with her alcoholic and violent father.	2016
Supernatural	The CW	Castiel	Misha Collins	Castiel is gay, and he confesses his love for Dean Winchester just moments before he dies in the third-to-last episode. However, Dean just watched stoically as his best friend confessed love and died. The series was accused of queerbaiting fans with flirtations between Castiel and Dean for a long time.	2005–2020
Supernatural	The CW	Charlie Bradbury	Felicia Day	Charlie Bradbury is an openly lesbian computer hacker and IT employee who assisted Sam and Dean Winchester in several cases.	2005–2020
Supernatural	The CW	Chuck Shurley	Rob Benedict	Chuck, also known as God, is bisexual.	2005–2020
Supernatural	The CW	Jesse and Cesar Cuevas	Lee Rumohr; Hugo Ateo	Jesse and Cesar are married, and both monster hunters.	2005–2020
Supernatural	The CW	Lily Baker	Jessica Harmon	Lily is a lesbian, and she accidentally killed her girlfriend and was attacked and hung on a windmill by a demon.	2005–2020
Supernatural	The CW	Claire Novak	Kathryn Newton	Claire is a lesbian and her first love was Kaia Nieves.	2005–2020
Swamp Thing	DC Universe	Liz Tremayne	Maria Sten	Liz is a lesbian bartender and newspaper reporter. She's in a relationship with Margaux.	2019
Swamp Thing	DC Universe	Margaux	Kelly Walker	Margaux is lesbian and Liz's girlfriend.	2019
Swamp Thing	DC Universe	Harlan Edwards	Leonardo Nam	Harlan is a gay CDC specialist.	2019
Swarm	Amazon Prime Video	Andrea "Dre" Greene	Dominique Fishback	Dre is a lesbian who is obsessed with a pop star. She's in a relationship with Rashida.	2023
Swarm	Amazon Prime Video	Rashida	Kiersey Clemons	Rashida is lesbian and Dre's girlfriend.	2023
Tales from the Crypt	HBO	Janet McKay (aka Ronald Wald)	Shelley Hack	Janet McKay is a trans woman. She is a CIA assassin.	1989-1996
Teen Wolf	MTV	Danny Mahealani	Keahu Kahuanui	Danny is openly gay and in a relationship with Ethan. He is on the lacrosse team with the titular character.	2011–2017
Teen Wolf	MTV	Ethan Steiner	Charlie Carver	Ethan is an alpha werewolf who becomes romantically involved with Danny in season three. He's also romantically involved with Jackson Whittemore. Actor Charlie Carver is gay as well.	2011–2017
Teen Wolf	MTV	Emily	Lauren McKnight	Emily is a lesbian, and Caitlin's girlfriend. They were going to have sex for the first time camping in the woods when she was attacked. Emily was the third virgin sacrifice.	2011–2017
Teen Wolf	MTV	Caitlin	Zelda Williams	Caitlin is bisexual, and Emily's girlfriend. It was her idea take Emily camping in the woods.	2011–2017
Teen Wolf	MTV	Lorraine Martin	Marcy Goldman	Lorraine is bisexual and a banshee. She was driven insane by parapsychologists, trying to understand her powers.	2011–2017
Teen Wolf	MTV	Mason Hewitt	Khylin Rhambo	Mason is an out and proud gay freshman athlete. He is dating Corey Bryant.	2011–2017
Teen Wolf	MTV	Brett Talbot	Cody Saintgnue	Brett is a bisexual werewolf playing on another lacrosse team. He was known for being casual about dancing with both men and women in night clubs. Brett was killed in season 6, episode "After Images".	2011–2017
Teen Wolf	MTV	Corey Bryant	Michael Johnston	Corey is gay and his boyfriend is Lucas.	2011–2017
Teen Wolf	MTV	Lucas	Eddie Ramos	Lucas is gay and was Corey's boyfriend. He was turned into a werewolf-scorpion chimera by the Dread Doctors, and killed soon thereafter.	2011–2017
Teen Wolf	MTV	Jackson Whittemore	Colton Haynes	Jackson is gay and in the final season, Jackson and Ethan are a committed romantic couple living in London.	2011–2017
The Terror	AMC	Cornelius Hickey	Adam Nagaitis	Cornelius has a secret relationship with William Gibson. Although they break up in episode 3, they remain close and still have strong feelings for each other.	2018–
The Terror	AMC	William Gibson	Edward Ashley	William is in a secret relationship with Cornelius Hickey.	2018–
Tokyo Ghoul:re	Tokyo MX	Tooru Mutsuki	Fujiwara Natsumi; Mikaela Krantz	Tooru Mutsuki is a trans man. He is a Special Class Ghoul Investigator in a rural branch office of the CCG. Description of series: Tokyo has become a cruel and merciless city, a place where vicious creatures called ghouls exist alongside humans. The citizens live in constant fear of these bloodthirsty savages and their thirst for human flesh.	2018
True Blood	HBO	Lafayette Reynolds	Nelsan Ellis	Lafayette is a gay short-order cook, drug dealer and sex worker. He's in a relationship with Jesús Velásquez, and later starts a relationship with a vampire named James.	2008–2014
True Blood	HBO	Tara Thornton	Rutina Wesley	Tara is a lesbian vampire and Lafayette's cousin. She is killed off by a Hep-V vampire.	2008–2014
True Blood	HBO	Jason Stackhouse	Ryan Kwanten	Jason is shown to have multiple gay sex dreams about men, and in one episode, gay vampire Lafayette got Jason to strip dance in his briefs.	2008–2014
True Blood	HBO	Eric Northman	Alexander Skarsgård	Eric Northman is a pansexual vampire and the sheriff of the vampires in his town. He has multiple relations with men.	2008–2014
True Blood	HBO	Eddie Gautier	Stephen Root	Eddie is a gay vampire and former accountant, one of Lafeyette's clients.	2008–2014
True Blood	HBO	Steve Newlin	Michael McMillian	Steve is gay and starts out as the leader of an anti-vampire Christian ministry. After he is made a vampire, he comes out to Jason Stackhouse as a "gay vampire American".	2008–2014
True Blood	HBO	Jesus Velasquez	Kevin Alejandro	Jesus is gay and Lafayette's boyfriend. He is a nurse at the retirement home where Lafayette's mother lives and a brujo (male witch).	2008–2014
True Blood	HBO	Russell Edgington	Denis O'Hare	Russell is gay, and the manipulative, angry, vampire king of Mississippi who killed without abandon.	2008–2014
True Blood	HBO	Talbot Angelis	Theo Alexander	Talbot is a gay vampire, and was the partner of Russell Edgington. He was seduced and then murdered by Eric Northman.	2008–2014
True Blood	HBO	Pam Ravenscroft	Kristin Bauer van Straten	Pam is a bisexual vampire, and second-in-command and co-owner of Fangtasia, a vampire bar.	2008–2014
True Blood	HBO	David Finch	John Prosky	David is a politician and an occasional sex client of Lafayette's.	2008–2014
True Blood	HBO	Nan Flanagan	Jessica Tuck	Nan is bisexual and the official American Vampire League spokesperson.	2008–2014
True Blood	HBO	Nora Gainesborough	Lucy Griffiths	Nora is a bisexual vampire and dies from vampire Hep-V.	2008–2014
True Blood	HBO	Naomi	Vedette Lim	Naomi is a lesbian, and a martial artist who slept with Tara. They broke up over concerns of vampires.	2008–2014
True Blood	HBO	Sophie-Anne Leclerq	Evan Rachel Wood	Queen Sophie is a bisexual vampire, and is killed by a wooden bullet shot by American Vampire League snipers.	2008–2014
True Blood	HBO	Hadley Hale	Lindsey Haun	Hadley is lesbian, and one of the Queen's lovers and a waitress at the faerie nightclub.	2008–2014
V Wars	Netflix	Mila Dubov	Laura Vandervoort	Mila Dubov is a lesbian vampire. She refuses to kill, instead, living off blood from blood banks.	2019-
V Wars	Netflix	Elysse Chambers	Bo Martyn	Elysse Chambers is a lesbian detective. She is Mila Dubov's love interest.	2019-
The Vampire Diaries	The CW	Bill Forbes	Jack Coleman	Bill is gay.	2009–2017
The Vampire Diaries	The CW	Luke Parker	Chris Brochu	Luke is gay.	2009–2017
The Vampire Diaries	The CW	Mary Louise	Teressa Liane	Mary is a lesbian.	2009–2017
The Walking Dead	AMC	Aaron	Ross Marquand	Aaron is gay and one of the residents of the Alexandria Safe-Zone. He is married to Eric Raleigh. After Eric's death, he has a sexual relationship with Paul "Jesus" Rovia.	2010–
The Walking Dead	AMC	Alisha	Juliana Harkavy	Alisha is lesbian and is killed in a firefight.	2010–
The Walking Dead	AMC	Tara Chambler	Alanna Masterson	Tara is lesbian. She enters into a brief relationship with former Marine Alisha.	2010–
The Walking Dead	AMC	Denise Cloyd	Merritt Wever	Denise is lesbian. She began a relationship with Tara in the sixth season and is later killed.	2010–
The Walking Dead	AMC	Eric Raleigh	Jordan Woods-Robinson	Eric is gay and Aaron's husband.	2010–
The Walking Dead	AMC	Paul "Jesus" Rovia	Tom Payne	Jesus is gay. He comes out in episode "The Other Side.	2010–
The Walking Dead	AMC	Yumiko Okumura	Eleanor Matsuura	Yumiko is lesbian.	2010–
The Walking Dead	AMC	Magna	Nadia Hilker	Magna is lesbian. Yumiko and Magna are a couple.	2010–
Wayward Pines	FOX	Frank Armstrong	Michael Garza	Frank Armstrong is gay.	2015–2016
Wellington Paranormal	TVNZ 2	Officer O’Leary	Karen O'Leary	O’Leary is a lesbian, and a police officer investigating paranormal incidents.	2018-
What We Do in the Shadows	FX	Nadja	Natasia Demetriou	Nadja is a bisexual vampire.	2019-
What We Do in the Shadows	FX	Laszlo Cravensworth	Matt Berry	Laszlo is bisexual. He is an English nobleman turned into a vampire by Nadja and is now married to her.	2019-
What We Do in the Shadows	FX	Nandor	Kayvan Novak	Nandor is a bisexual 757-year-old vampire.	2019-
What We Do in the Shadows	FX	Baron Afanas	Doug Jones	Baron Afanas is an ancient bisexual vampire.	2019-
What We Do in the Shadows	FX	Guillermo	Harvey Guillén	Guillermo is a queer human. He is the dedicated personal assistant to the vampires. He aspires to one day becoming a vampire through hard work and dedicated service.	2019-
Wreck	BBC Three	Officer Beaker	Warren James Dunning	Officer Beaker is presumably bisexual, as he was mentioned to have had a hook-up with a woman named Amy, and was revealed to have had a sexual relationship with Hamish.	2022-
Wreck	BBC Three	Hamish Campbell	James Phoon	Hamish is gay and secretly had a sexual relationship with Officer Beaker.	2022-
Wreck	BBC Three	Vivian Lim	Thaddea Graham	Vivian is a lesbian.	2022-
Wreck	BBC Three	Rosie Preston	Miya Ocego	Rosie is a trans woman.	2022-
Wreck	BBC Three	Olly Reyes	Anthony Rickman	Olly is gay as well as Jamie's love interest.	2022-
Wreck	BBC Three	Lily Tee	Ramanique Ahluwalia	Lily Tee is lesbian as well as Vivian's love interest in the first series.	2022-
Wreck	BBC Three	Jamie Walsh	Oscar Kennedy	Jamie is gay.	2022-
Yellowjackets	Showtime	Taissa Turner	Tawny Cypress (adult Taissa) and Jasmin Savoy Brown (teen Taissa)	Taissa is a lesbian who is married to Simone. In subsequent seasons she rekindles a relationship with her high school sweetheart, Van.	
Yellowjackets	Showtime	Simone Abara	Rukiya Bernard	Simone is a lesbian who is married to Taissa.	
Yellowjackets	Showtime	Coach Benjamin Scott	Steven Krueger	Coach Ben is gay, but closeted in his professional life as a high school soccer coach. He is dating Paul prior to the events of the show.	
Yellowjackets	Showtime	Paul	Francois Arnaud	Paul is gay and dating Coach Ben prior to the events of the show.	
Yellowjackets	Showtime	Vanessa "Van" Palmer	Lauren Ambrose (adult Van) and Liv Hewson (teen Van)	Van is a lesbian, and is Taissa's girlfriend.	
Yellowjackets	Showtime	Melissa	Hilary Swank (adult Melissa) and Jenna Burgess (teen Melissa).	Melissa is a lesbian who briefly dates Shauna Shipman. In the present day storyline, she goes by the alias "Kelly" and is married to Alex.	
Yellowjackets	Showtime	Alex	Jaylee Hamidi	Alex is presumably a lesbian, though she could be bisexual. She is married to Melissa in the present day, who she knows under the alias "Kelly".	
Yellowjackets	Showtime	Shauna Sadecki (née Shipman)	Melanie Lynskey (adult Shauna) and Sophie Nélisse (teen Shauna)	Shauna is presumably bisexual. She is married to Jeff Sadecki (Warren Kole) in the present day storyline, and briefly dated Melissa in the teen storyline. A long-standing reading of Yellowjackets suggests that Shauna harbored a crush on her late best friend, Jackie Taylor (Ella Purnell), and that their relationship is infused with homoerotic subtext. Jackie and Shauna's relationship has been touted as representative of the "Sapphic Gaze".	

== See also ==
- List of horror television programs
- LGBT themes in horror fiction
- List of animated series with LGBT characters
- List of comedy television series with LGBT characters
- List of dramatic television series with LGBT characters: 1960s–2000s
- List of dramatic television series with LGBT characters: 2010–2015
- List of dramatic television series with LGBT characters: 2016–2019
- List of dramatic television series with LGBT characters: 2020s
- List of LGBT characters in soap operas
