= Could It Be... Satan? =

- American Horror Story episode
- Episode no.: Season 8 Episode 4
- Directed by: Sheree Folkson
- Written by: Tim Minear
- Production code: 8ATS04
- Original air date: October 3, 2018
- Running time: 42 minutes

Guest appearances
- Frances Conroy as Myrtle Snow; Taissa Farmiga as Zoe Benson; Gabourey Sidibe as Queenie; Jon Jon Briones as Ariel Augustus; Billy Porter as Behold Chablis; BD Wong as Baldwin Pennypacker; Brendan McCarthy as Detective Monroe

Episode chronology
← Previous "Forbidden Fruit"	Next → "Boy Wonder"
- American Horror Story: Apocalypse

"Could It Be... Satan?" is the fourth episode of the eighth season of the anthology television series American Horror Story. It aired on October 3, 2018, on the cable network FX. The episode was written by Tim Minear, and directed by Sheree Folkson.

== Plot ==
At this point, the action flashes back several years to reveal Michael Langdon's past and the story behind Outpost 3.

Students at the Hawthorne School for Exceptional Young Men study magic with their instructor, Behold Chablis. Baldwin Pennypacker, John Henry Moore, and Ariel Augustus, the Grand Chancellor, await Chablis with a video featuring a young warlock named Michael Langdon. Langdon is brought to the school and the instructors evaluate his power level.

Ariel explains that they wish Langdon to challenge Supreme Witch Cordelia for Supremacy. Cordelia is summoned from Miss Robicheaux's Academy in New Orleans and travels to Hawthorne. While the women scoff at the idea of a male Supreme, Ariel insists that Cordelia administer the Seven Wonders to test Langdon. Cordelia refuses, saying that it would surely condemn the boy to death. The conversation turns toward a past failure of Cordelia's, when she abandoned coven member Queenie after her disappearance in Los Angeles. Cordelia responds that she found Queenie's ghost in the Hotel Cortez, but was unable to rescue her, as she could not penetrate the demonic portal surrounding the hotel. Langdon travels to Los Angeles and successfully emerges from the hotel with Queenie. He then travels to Hell to rescue Madison. As Cordelia and the trio make plans to leave the Hawthorne School and return to New Orleans, Langdon greets them with Queenie and Madison. Upon seeing the returned witches, Cordelia faints.

== Reception ==
"Could It Be... Satan?" was watched by 2.02 million people during its original broadcast, and gained a 1.0 ratings share among adults aged 18–49.

The episode received positive reviews from critics, with Emma Roberts’ performance being highlighted. On the review aggregator Rotten Tomatoes, "Could It Be... Satan?" holds an 88% approval rating, based on 16 reviews with an average rating of 7.50/10. The critical consensus reads, "Cast chemistry and just the right amount of self-effacing humor drive "Could it Be... Satan?" as worlds collide and fan dreams come true."

Ron Hogan of Den of Geek gave the episode a 4/5, saying, "Coven was not my favorite series of American Horror Story, but it was one of the show's better ones and from the first bitchy comment flying out of Madison Montgomery's mouth, I am reminded why Coven is a fan favorite. The appearance of the witches immediately injects life into the series, and even when the show follows a group of warlocks that we've never known, there's immediate tension and chemistry between the group that betters anything we got with the mismatched group of survivors pre-Halloween."

Kat Rosenfield from Entertainment Weekly gave the episode a B+. She was not impressed by the warlocks in general except by the council members, calling them "an all-star cast of Ryan Murphy faves". However, she appreciated the scenes with Queenie and Madison, but also the ending of the episode. Finally, she wondered what was the point of the episode title, as "Langdon is very clearly Satan or at least Satan-adjacent by a maximum of one degree". Vulture's Ziwe Fumudoh gave the episode a 2 out of 5, with a mixed review. Much like Rosenfield, she was not a big fan of the all-boys warlocks group, calling them a "circle-jerk of warlocks making paperweights", but admitted that their council members were "remarkably cast". She also criticized the gender binary between witches and warlocks, established by the episode. However, she still enjoyed Madison's personal hell scene.
