= Return to Murder House =

- American Horror Story episode
- Episode no.: Season 8 Episode 6
- Directed by: Sarah Paulson
- Written by: Crystal Liu
- Production code: 8ATS06
- Original air date: October 17, 2018
- Running time: 55 minutes

Guest appearances
- Dylan McDermott as Dr. Ben Harmon; Connie Britton as Vivien Harmon; Frances Conroy as Moira O'Hara; Jessica Lange as Constance Langdon; Taissa Farmiga as Violet Harmon; Billy Porter as Behold Chablis; Naomi Grossman as Samantha Crowe; Mena Suvari as Elizabeth Short; Carlo Rota as Anton LaVey; John Duerler as Realtor

Episode chronology
← Previous "Boy Wonder"	Next → "Traitor"
- American Horror Story: Apocalypse

"Return to Murder House" is the sixth episode of the eighth season of the anthology television series American Horror Story. Written by Crystal Liu and directed by Sarah Paulson, it aired on October 17, 2018, on the cable network FX. The episode saw a return to the setting used for season one, Murder House, as well as the reappearance of original cast members Connie Britton, Dylan McDermott, and Jessica Lange. "Return to Murder House" received critical acclaim from reviewers, who praised Paulson's direction, Lange's return, and the performances and chemistry of Emma Roberts and Billy Porter. For her performance in the episode, Lange was nominated for a Primetime Emmy Award for Outstanding Guest Actress in a Drama Series.

== Plot ==
Madison and Behold buy the Murder House on behalf of the Coven, under the pretense that they are a married couple. They cast a spell to force the spirits of the house to appear to them. They encounter the ghost of Constance Langdon, who agrees to provide information on her grandson Michael if they banish her old nemesis, Moira O'Hara, from the house. Madison and Behold exhume Moira's bones and bury them with her mother's; Moira is then set free from the house.

Constance tells them that she sensed evil in Michael from very early on. In his youth, he began killing animals and then his babysitter. After Michael ages ten years overnight, Constance enlists the help of a Catholic priest, whom Michael kills. Constance, out of hopelessness, commits suicide in the Murder House, where she is reunited with Tate, Beauregard, and her fourth child, a little girl with no eyes. Madison and Behold then interview Ben and Vivien Harmon, who further reveal the evil in Michael's soul. Vivien tells them that Michael's father is neither Ben nor Tate but the evil of the Murder House. Before leaving with Behold, Madison reunites Tate and Violet.

== Reception ==
=== Ratings ===
"Return to Murder House" was watched by 2.01 million people during its original broadcast, and gained a 0.9 ratings share among adults aged 18–49.

=== Reviews ===
The episode has received widespread acclaim from critics and fans alike. On the review aggregator Rotten Tomatoes, "Return to Murder House" holds a 100% approval rating, based on 17 reviews with an average rating of 9.20/10. The critical consensus reads, "Deftly directed by Sarah Paulson and featuring the triumphant return of the one and only Jessica Lange, 'Return to Murder House' is peak fan service—in the best possible way."

Ron Hogan, of Den of Geek, gave the episode a 4/5, saying, "'Return to Murder House' is more than just a return to a location, or revisiting characters. It feels like something of a return to form. The season has been very impressive, and a lot of fun to boot. The shorter episode order seems to be beneficial to the pace of the show, and the merged seasons has given Apocalypse the best parts of both Murder House and Coven, with horror, weirdness, and wit in equal measure."

Kat Rosenfield from Entertainment Weekly gave the episode an A. She praised the return of multiple Murder House characters, especially Vivien's (Britton) and Constance's (Lange). She also enjoyed the latter's flashbacks with Michael, calling them "an illuminating history for Michael as well as an epic monologue for Jessica Lange". Finally, she was a big fan of the dynamics between Billy Porter and Emma Roberts, commenting that it was the "greatest thing about this season" after Lange's return.

Vulture's Ziwe Fumudoh gave the episode a 5 out of 5, with a positive review. She commented that "this episode was everything I dreamed of", calling it "the most ambitious crossover event in history". Much like Rosenfield, she praised the dynamics between Porter and Roberts, and was a huge fan of Jessica Lange's performance. Moreover, she enjoyed the reunion between Moira and her mother, saying that the scene was "a touching moment". Finally, she praised the writing and direction of the episode.

=== Reaction from individuals involved ===
The Church of Satan criticized the episode for its inaccurate portrayal of Anton LaVey and of Satanists in general, pointing out that LaVey did not believe in the Antichrist or practice ritual sacrifice. Further comments described the episode as "unimpressive and boring", and dismissed the "lazy writers" who "appropriated his name and image for their Devil worship drivel".
