= The End (American Horror Story) =

- American Horror Story episode
- Episode no.: Season 8 Episode 1
- Directed by: Bradley Buecker
- Written by: Ryan Murphy & Brad Falchuk
- Production code: 8ATS01
- Original air date: September 12, 2018
- Running time: 44 minutes

Guest appearances
- Billy Eichner as Brock; Kyle Allen as Timothy Campbell; Ash Santos as Emily; Erika Ervin as The Fist; Jeffrey Bowyer-Chapman as Andre Stevens; Dina Meyer as Nora Campbell; Travis Schuldt as Mr. Campbell; John Getz as Coco's Father; Troy Winbush as Newscaster; Chad James Buchanan as Stu; Sean Blakemore as Cooperative Agent; Lesley Fera as Cooperative Agent; Joan Collins as Evie Gallant

Episode chronology
← Previous "Great Again"	Next → "The Morning After"
- American Horror Story: Apocalypse

"The End" is the first episode and season premiere of the eighth season of the anthology television series American Horror Story. It aired on September 12, 2018, on the cable network FX. The episode was written by Ryan Murphy & Brad Falchuk, and directed by Bradley Buecker.

== Plot ==
In the near future, while heiress Coco St. Pierre Vanderbilt gets her hair done by Mr. Gallant in Santa Monica, people are warned of an impending nuclear missile strike. Coco escapes the city on a private jet along with her assistant Mallory, Gallant, and his grandmother Evie, but leaving Coco's boyfriend Brock behind. The nuclear blast hits, destroying Los Angeles. Several other world cities are also destroyed.

Teenager Timothy Campbell is also evacuated, without his family, by guards from an organization called the Cooperative who arrive, stating that this is because of Timothy's genetic makeup. After being evacuated, Timothy meets another chosen survivor, Emily.

Two weeks later, nuclear holocaust has effectively ended the world and nuclear winter has descended. Timothy and Emily are taken to Outpost 3, one of several fallout bunkers across the world under the rule of the Cooperative. Outpost 3's overseer Wilhemina Venable explains to Timothy and Emily that in Outpost 3 there are two castes: "purples" and "grays". Purples are the "elite", who bought a ticket or were chosen to survive. Grays are the worker class. There are strict rules, including no unauthorized sexual intercourse and no going outside due to the risk of radiation contamination. The "purples" consist of Timothy, Emily, Coco, Gallant, Evie, former talk show host Dinah Stevens, Dinah's son Andre, and Andre's boyfriend Stu. Mallory is a "gray".

Rations begin to run low and have only enough food for the next eighteen months. Miriam Mead, Outpost 3's sadistic warden, tampers with a Geiger counter so it detects traces of radiation on Gallant and Stu. The two are brutishly "decontaminated", but Mead pretends she still detects radiation traces on Stu and so kills him. During dinner later, Andre finds human bones in the meal and deduces that they have been eating Stu.

Over the next eighteen months, Timothy and Emily develop a romantic relationship. Michael Langdon then arrives at the outpost and tells Venable that many other outposts have been overrun. Michael states he will judge who is fit to be saved and join an impenetrable outpost with a ten-year food supply. Outside, Mead kills the horses that brought Langdon to the outpost, and their corpses are devoured by unseen monsters.

== Reception ==
"The End" was watched by 3.08 million people during its original broadcast, and gained a 1.5 ratings share among adults aged 18–49.

The episode received positive reviews from critics, with many critics calling it the show's best premiere in years. On the review aggregator Rotten Tomatoes, "The End" holds a 91% approval rating, based on 32 reviews with an average rating of 8.10 out of 10. The critical consensus reads, "AHS returns in frightening form with "The End," a wickedly fun - if unfortunately witch-free - premiere that's equal parts camp, chaos, and Sarah Paulson chewing scenery like no one else can."

Ron Hogan of Den of Geek gave the episode a positive review, saying, "Ryan Murphy's shows tend to start out strong and then the cracks begin to show, but I think with the short season order (10 episodes) and the very strong premise, he'll continue his recent trend of stellar storytelling and not get too bogged down with aliens and assorted unrelated weirdness. Even if it goes off the rails, Apocalypse will go off the rails in entertaining Murphy fashion, with a brilliant cast to bring that inspired weirdness to life. The best is yet to come."

Kat Rosenfield from Entertainment Weekly gave the episode an A−. She enjoyed Paulson's performance, calling her "fabulously stern", and appreciated that the episode did not use the usual post-apocalypse tropes. She also praised the costumes worn by the characters, saying that "everybody looks fabulous" and that the episode made "the apocalypse look like the world's greatest Prince tribute show". Vulture's Brian Moylan gave the episode a 5 out of 5, with a positive review, commenting, "this was one of the strongest premieres in American Horror Story history". He added that it was "a clear expectation for what the season was going to be about, introduced us to some delicious characters, had a great balance between scares and camp, and evoked a clear mood and visual style."

Matt Fowler of IGN gave the episode a 6.4 out of 10, with a mixed review. He said, "American Horror Story leaned into camp and comedy, including a couple of time jumps meant for laughs, to speed us through a sassy set-up episode that could have actually been disturbing and scary. Somewhere down the line, the franchise stopped evenly mixing its sinister elements and snarky quips and it's worked to defang the show a bit. The beginning and end of the episode though, featuring the exodus from LA and the arrival of the antichrist, helped juice things up."

In The A.V. Club, Molly Horan rated the episode a B−, criticizing it for not being sufficiently scary.
