= Forbidden Fruit (American Horror Story) =

- American Horror Story episode
- Episode no.: Season 8 Episode 3
- Directed by: Loni Peristere
- Written by: Manny Coto
- Production code: 8ATS03
- Original air date: September 26, 2018
- Running time: 42 minutes

Guest appearances
- Frances Conroy as Myrtle Snow; Billy Eichner as Brock; Kyle Allen as Timothy Campbell; Ash Santos as Emily; Erika Ervin as The Fist; Jeffrey Bowyer-Chapman as Andre Stevens; James MacDonald as The Horn

Episode chronology
← Previous "The Morning After"	Next → "Could It Be... Satan?"
- American Horror Story: Apocalypse

"Forbidden Fruit" is the third episode of the American Horror Story: Apocalypse, the eighth season of the anthology television series American Horror Story. It aired on September 26, 2018, on the cable network FX. The episode was written by Manny Coto, and directed by Loni Peristere.

== Plot ==
Langdon unveils his true demonic form to Mallory, and she makes flames shoot from a fireplace. Venable confides to Mead that she has not been selected to move on to the Sanctuary and Mead suggests they kill everyone.

Brock navigates a nuclear wasteland and guns down a cannibalistic tribe. He sees a horse-drawn carriage pass by. The carriage delivers apples to Outpost 3, and Venable decides to inject them with venom. Brock infiltrates Outpost 3 and attends Venable's Halloween masquerade ball. Coco, presuming Brock to be Langdon in costume, seduces him back to her bedroom. Brock then reveals himself to Coco and stabs her in the forehead.

The Outpost 3 guests bob for poisonous apples. Venable instructs everyone to wait to eat simultaneously. The guests comply and concurrently succumb to the poison. Venable and Mead confront Langdon, and Venable proclaims that they will be making the selections. Mead attempts to shoot Langdon but finds herself turning the gun on Venable against her will and shooting her, under the order of Langdon. Langdon reveals that he created Mead and that she was modeled after a caregiver from his childhood, which consoles her. Later, Cordelia Goode, Madison Montgomery, and Myrtle Snow descend upon Outpost 3 and Cordelia resurrects Mallory, Dinah, and Coco, who reveals themself as witches that live once more.

== Reception ==
"Forbidden Fruit" was watched by 1.95 million people during its original broadcast, and gained a 0.9 ratings share among adults aged 18–49.

The episode has been critically acclaimed, with most of the critics praising the cliffhanger. On the review aggregator Rotten Tomatoes, "Forbidden Fruit" holds a 100% approval rating, based on 18 reviews with an average rating of 8.10/10. The critical consensus reads, ""Forbidden Fruit" pushes Apocalypse forward, delivering on the gore, the glee, and most importantly, the girls."

Ron Hogan of Den of Geek gave the episode a 4.5/5, saying, "So far, aside from a mention of genetic perfection, there hasn't been much of a tie-in to the world of the witches (or to the ghosts, for the matter, aside from Michael Langdon's presence). However, that connection was made more openly this week, after a solid episode which featured some very impressive visual trickery from director Loni Peristere. From the cold opening to the surprise at the end, 'Forbidden Fruit' is one of the most impressive editorial feats of the entire series, let alone this season."

Kat Rosenfield from Entertainment Weekly gave the episode a B+. She particularly praised the ball scenes, saying that they are "a serious mashup of various fairytale tropes: poisoned apples, a masquerade ball, and even a Cinderella figure yearning for greater things in the background", and also appreciated all the different twists of the episode. Finally, she enjoyed the cliffhanger with the Coven witches. Vulture's Ziwe Fumudoh gave the episode a 5 out of 5, with a positive review. Much like Rosenfield, she particularly praised the death scene of all Outpost 3 inhabitants, commenting that "I have never been so disgusted and so entertained in my life", and also liked the revelation about Mead's and Langdon's relationship. Finally, she really enjoyed the arrival of the witches, and the cliffhanger of the episode.

Matt Fowler of IGN gave the episode a 6.8 out of 10, with a mixed to positive review. He said, "Once the music switched from Bread to Rolling Stones, and the Coven ladies majestically swooped in, things felt infused with more energy. There was a welcome supernatural lightness in those final moments that seemed to coat all the previous ugliness and stuffiness with a silver sheen. That's not to say the season's about to get exponentially better, but it was a very welcome shift from the Lazy Susan of aggravation these past few weeks have offered up."
