= Boy Wonder (American Horror Story) =

- American Horror Story episode
- Episode no.: Season 8 Episode 5
- Directed by: Gwyneth Horder-Payton
- Written by: John J. Gray
- Production code: 8ATS05
- Original air date: October 10, 2018
- Running time: 40 minutes

Guest appearances
- Frances Conroy as Myrtle Snow; Lily Rabe as Misty Day; Taissa Farmiga as Zoe Benson; Gabourey Sidibe as Queenie; Jon Jon Briones as Ariel Augustus; Billy Porter as Behold Chablis; BD Wong as Baldwin Pennypacker; John Getz as Coco's Father; Wayne Pére as Mr. Kingery; Stevie Nicks as herself

Episode chronology
← Previous "Could It Be... Satan?"	Next → "Return to Murder House"
- American Horror Story: Apocalypse

"Boy Wonder" is the fifth episode of the eighth season of the anthology television series American Horror Story. It aired on October 10, 2018, on the cable network FX. The episode was written by John J. Gray, and directed by Gwyneth Horder-Payton.

== Plot ==
After passing out, Cordelia Goode experiences a nightmarish vision of a hellish and desolate world. Upon awakening, she agrees to administer the Seven Wonders for Michael Langdon so that he may rise to Supreme.

Returning to New Orleans, Myrtle Snow chides Cordelia for allowing a man to take the position of Supreme, claiming that men make terrible leaders. Cordelia confesses to Myrtle that her powers are beginning to fade, the sign that her reign as Supreme is coming to an end. Cordelia welcomes new student Coco St. Pierre Vanderbilt and her father.

At the Hawthorne School, Ariel, Behold, John Henry and Baldwin cast a protection spell for Langdon in preparation for the Seven Wonders. Langdon shows Moore a glimpse of his true form. Miriam Mead kills Moore before he can warn anyone. Langdon successfully passes six of the Seven Wonders. For the seventh, Langdon must descend into Hell and return with fellow witch Misty Day. Langdon passes the seventh challenge and Cordelia proclaims Langdon the next Supreme.

Misty tells Cordelia that the evil within Hell appeared to speak to Langdon, which Cordelia assumes was negotiation for Misty's release. Misty describes Langdon as wearing "the perfume of death." Cordelia realizes that she now has proof of Langdon's capacity for evil and rejoices that she now has all of her original sisters returned so that they may fight against Langdon in the upcoming apocalypse. Cordelia pulls Madison aside and instructs her to gather information about Langdon. Behold, eavesdropping on the conversation, says that he will be joining Madison as he now has concerns of his own about Langdon. Cordelia asks Madison to travel to the place "where it all began": the Murder House.

== Reception ==
"Boy Wonder" was watched by 2.12 million people during its original broadcast, and gained a 1.0 ratings share among adults aged 18–49.

The episode has been critically acclaimed. On the review aggregator Rotten Tomatoes, "Boy Wonder" holds a 100% approval rating, based on 13 reviews with an average rating of 8.50/10. The critical consensus reads, "Classic characters returning, along with a peek back at Murder House and a Roanoke Easter egg, make "Boy Wonder" an episode of heightened returns—not to mention fantastical gore and camp."

Ron Hogan of Den of Geek gave the episode a positive review, saying, "One of the best aspects about the addition of Coven to the Apocalypse grouping is the politics involved in the witch world. There are wheels within wheels, and plots within plots." He added, "The scheming, as laid out in John J. Gray's script, is impressive indeed. Myrtle (the wonderful Frances Conroy) and Madison (Emma Roberts) pepper the script with fun, bitchy bon mots and asides. Michael and Ariel work their plot, the witches work their plot, and the clearly defined group dynamics end up muddled at the end of the episode, with various factions and sub factions squaring off with one another."

Kat Rosenfield from Entertainment Weekly gave the episode a B. She enjoyed the Seven Wonders sequence, commenting that it was "a campy throwback all the way to the golden age of silent cinema". Moreover, she really appreciated the cliffhanger, calling it "breathtaking", and the characters' outfits, particularly Madison's. She also supported and approved Myrtle Snow's feminist opinion about the role of Supreme. Vulture's Ziwe Fumudoh gave the episode a 5 out of 5, with a positive review. She appreciated Paulson's performance, especially during the scene where Cordelia threatens Briones' Ariel. She also loved the cliffhanger of the episode, saying "this already very good season is about to get even better". Finally, she was a huge fan of Stevie Nicks' musical appearance, commenting "This is perfect casting. This is entertainment. I would love for every American Horror Story episode from now on to feature a ten-minute musical performance".
