= Chad Buchanan =

American actor and model

Chad James Buchanan
- Born: August 28, 1993 (age 32)
- Other names: Chad Buchanan
- Occupations: Actor, model
- Years active: 2011–present
- Height: 6 ft 4 in (1.93 m)

Chad James Buchanan (born August 28, 1993) is an American actor and model. He grew up in Columbus, Ohio.

== Television ==
He is best known for his role as Hunter Morgan on Star, and has appeared in several television shows including Jane the Virgin, Grey's Anatomy, Mary + Jane, Glee, American Horror Story, and American Horror Stories. He also joined the cast of Marvel's Inhumans.

== Modeling career ==
Chad is represented by Premium Models in Paris, d'management group in Milan, and NEXT Model Management in Los Angeles.

== Filmography ==
=== Film ===
Year	Title	Role	Notes
2011	God Don't Make the Laws	Colbie Palmer's Son	
2016	Is That a Gun in Your Pocket?	Keith	

=== Television ===
Year	Title	Role	Notes
2012	The Glades	Adam	Episode: "Close Encounters"
2014	I Didn't Do It	Seth	Episode: "The Pilot"
2014	Surviving Jack	Evan	Guest role; 2 episodes
2014	Glee	Bartender	Episode: "Opening Night"
2014	Grey's Anatomy	Brian	Episode: "Puzzle with a Piece Missing"
2014–2015	Awkward	Wilson	Guest role; 2 episodes
2016	Jane the Virgin	McBaskets	Episode: "Chapter Thirty-One
2016	Mary + Jane	Gary	Episode: "MarijuanaCon"
2016–2017	Star	Hunter Morgan	Recurring role; 13 episodes
2017	Inhumans	Dave	Recurring role; 4 episodes
2018	American Horror Story: Apocalypse	Stu	Episode: "The End"
2019	The InBetween	Will	Main cast
2021	American Horror Stories	Rory	Episode: "BA'AL"
