= The Morning After (American Horror Story) =

- American Horror Story episode
- Episode no.: Season 8 Episode 2
- Directed by: Jennifer Lynch
- Written by: James Wong
- Production code: 8ATS02
- Original air date: September 19, 2018
- Running time: 41 minutes

Guest appearances
- Kyle Allen as Timothy Campbell; Ash Santos as Emily; Erika Ervin as The Fist; Jeffrey Bowyer-Chapman as Andre Stevens; Joan Collins as Evie Gallant

Episode chronology
← Previous "The End"	Next → "Forbidden Fruit"
- American Horror Story: Apocalypse

"The Morning After" is the second episode of the eighth season of the anthology television series American Horror Story. It aired on September 19, 2018, on the cable network FX. The episode was written by James Wong, and directed by Jennifer Lynch.

== Plot ==
The Outpost 3 guests assemble in the library. Langdon enters and proclaims that the other American compounds have been destroyed and that he will be evaluating candidates for survival. Those chosen will live in The Sanctuary. Those not selected will be given suicide vials. Mr. Gallant volunteers to be evaluated first.

In Venable's office, Langdon and Gallant discuss Gallant's hostile relationship with his grandmother. In his own room, Gallant fantasizes about Langdon while masturbating and is interrupted by the arrival of the Rubber Man. Evie observes the two having sex and informs the warden about her grandson's indiscretions.

Timothy and Emily sneak into Langdon's bedroom and discover emails detailing Venable's transgressions against proper protocol. Langdon visits Venable and inquires about her violations.

Mead relays Evie's story to Venable and they suspect that Langdon was the suited figure. Venable interrogates a chained Gallant while Mead whips him. Later, Langdon enters and insists he has never been in Gallant's bedroom. He calls Gallant pathetic and informs him that his own grandmother informed on him.

Gallant follows the Rubber Man to a bedroom and kills him by stabbing him with scissors. Langdon finds Gallant covered in the blood of his grandmother's corpse.

Timothy and Emily speculate on the true purpose of their saving and have sex for the first time. Mead intrudes and drags them away. They confront Venable about her self-imposed rules and she sends them off. Mead takes them to a chamber for execution, where Timothy shoots her in the torso in an escape attempt. She staggers away and her wound reveals white fluid and wires.

== Reception ==
"The Morning After" was watched by 2.21 million people during its original broadcast, and gained a 1.1 ratings share among adults aged 18–49.

The episode received positive reviews from critics, with much of the praise going towards Cody Fern's performance. On the review aggregator Rotten Tomatoes, "The Morning After" holds an 88% approval rating, based on 17 reviews with an average rating of 7.10/10. The critical consensus reads, "Though not as strong as the premiere, "The Morning After" works well enough thanks to its willingness to wade into weirder waters."

Ron Hogan of Den of Geek gave the episode a 3.5/5, saying, "I'm certain that the shocking and confusing events of this episode will come into play later in the season. It's early, and things are still building. What's confusing now will make more sense later, or will be buried beneath much more confusing things later on. Either way, 'The Morning After' is a satisfying enough episode that lacks the initial hook of the first episode, but adds plenty of weirdness into the snake stew."

Kat Rosenfield from Entertainment Weekly gave the episode a B. She was dubious because of the cliffhanger, saying that "even for a show where freaky moments are a dime a dozen, this one is weird as hell", but she appreciated the overall atmosphere and manipulation made by the character of Langdon. She also enjoyed the chemistry between Peters and Fern, commenting that "there's definitely a vibe". Vulture's Ziwe Fumudoh gave the episode a 5 out of 5, with a positive review. She particularly praised Paulson's performance, calling her "the perfect actress", but also Collins and her character, saying that "Evie is a cultural icon and I hope to be as influential and full of it as she is one day." Finally, she enjoyed the cliffhanger of the episode and the revelation about Mead's character.

Matt Fowler of IGN gave the episode a 6.0 out of 10, with a mixed review. He said, "Bringing Rubber Man, or whatever version of Rubber Man this is, back into the mix is a fun and firm way to state definitively that Murder House-y things are going to happen. The little random hauntings and trickery, which may also involve the Coven witches, are all that's keeping this story alive, unfortunately."
