= Keahu Kahuanui =

American actor (born 1986)

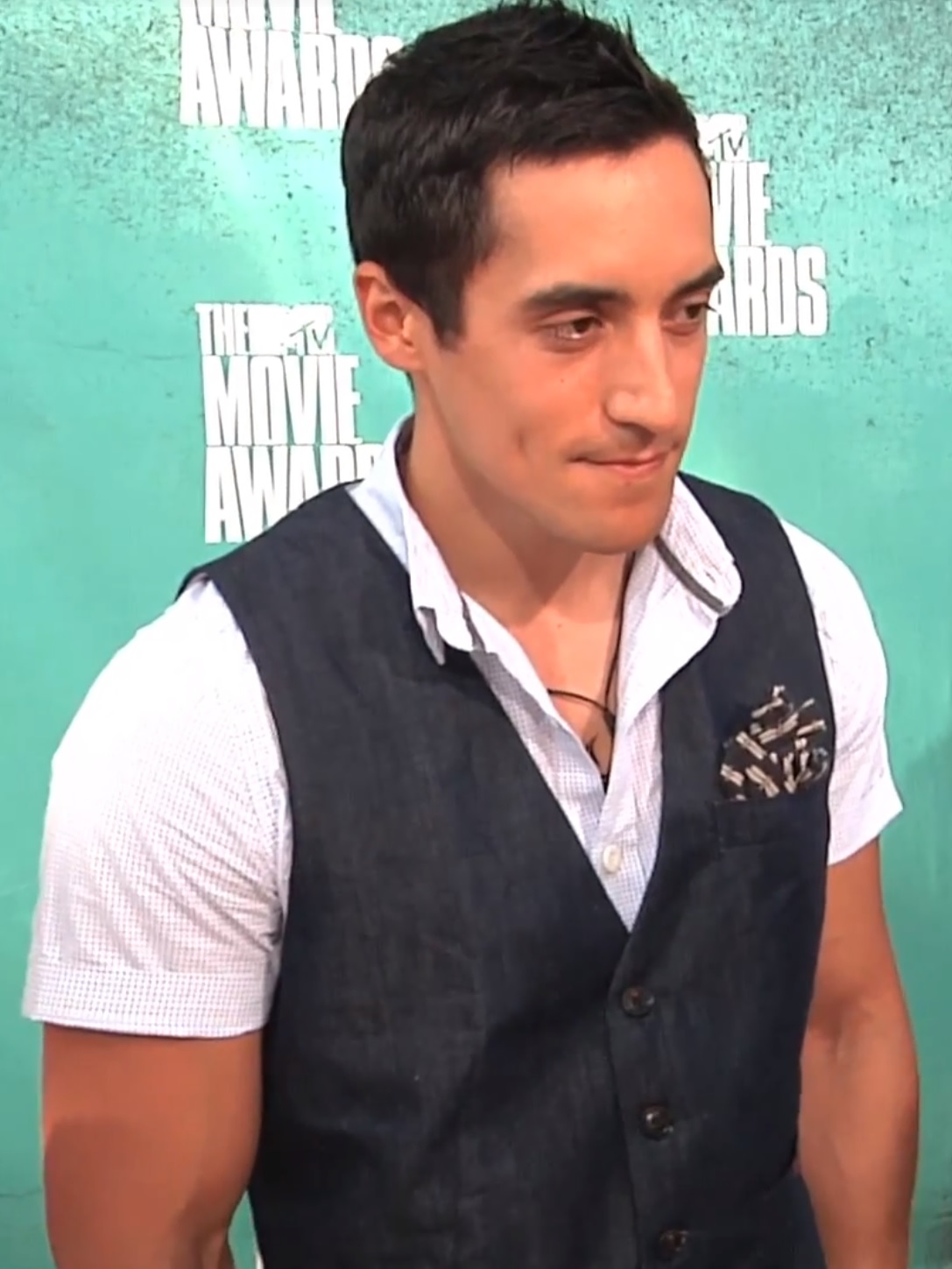
- Kahuanui interviewed at the MTV Movie Awards 2012
- Born: Keahupuihale Kahuanui; August 7, 1986 (age 40); Honolulu, Hawaii, U.S.
- Education: Boston University
- Occupations: Actor, Model, Twitch Streamer
- Years active: 2011–present

Keahu Kahuanui (born August 7, 1986) is an American actor and Twitch streamer, best known for his portrayal of the recurring character Danny Mahealani in the television series Teen Wolf on MTV.

== Early life ==
Kahuanui was born on August 7, 1986, in Honolulu, Hawaii. His family moved often through his childhood. He resides in Los Angeles. He ran track in high school and university before completing his bachelor's degree at Boston University in international relations after switching from engineering. Kahuanui has worked in the tech industry and has continued to present an interest in science and technology. He speaks German fluently and has demonstrated a competence in Mandarin Chinese.

Kahuanui has stated that he developed an interest in acting as a child and took part in plays, musicals, and commercials.

== Filmography ==
=== Television ===
Year	Title	Role	Notes
2011–2014	Teen Wolf	Danny Mahealani	Recurring role (seasons 1-3); 27 episodes
2011	The Secret Life of the American Teenager	Player #1	Episode: "And Circumstance"
2012	Hawaii Five-0	Cal Litoa	Episode: "Ha'alele"
2012	Cocktails with Stan	Himself	Episode: "Keahu Kahuanui"
2017	The Originals	Eddie	Episode: "No Quarter"

=== Film ===
Year	Title	Role	Notes
2015	Duel Club	Greg / Duellist	Short Film; Also a Producer
2017	The Concessionaires Must Die!	Creepy Guy	
