= American Horror Story: Apocalypse =

Eighth season of American Horror Story

- Season 8
- Promotional poster and home media cover art
- Showrunner: Ryan Murphy
- Starring: Sarah Paulson; Evan Peters; Adina Porter; Billie Lourd; Leslie Grossman; Cody Fern; Emma Roberts; Cheyenne Jackson; Kathy Bates
- No. of episodes: 10

Release
- Original network: FX
- Original release: September 12 – November 14, 2018

Season chronology
- ← Previous; Cult Next → 1984

The eighth season of the American horror anthology television series American Horror Story, subtitled Apocalypse, features the witches from the New Orleans coven as they battle the Antichrist and attempt to prevent the world from ending. The season is presented as a crossover between Murder House, Coven, and Hotel. The ensemble cast includes Sarah Paulson, Evan Peters, Adina Porter, Billie Lourd, Leslie Grossman, Cody Fern, Emma Roberts, Cheyenne Jackson, and Kathy Bates, with all returning from previous seasons, except newcomer Fern.

Created by Ryan Murphy and Brad Falchuk for the cable network FX, the series is produced by 20th Century Fox Television. Apocalypse was broadcast between September 12 and November 14, 2018, consisting of 10 episodes. The season was announced in January 2017 and received positive reviews from critics. In April 2019, the Academy of Television Arts & Sciences, which presents the Primetime Emmy Awards, announced that, for the first time in the series' history, a season would not qualify for the Limited Series categories, and would instead be moved to Drama. Apocalypse was ultimately nominated to five categories, including Outstanding Guest Actress in a Drama Series for Jessica Lange.

== Cast and characters ==
=== Main ===
Apocalypse main cast

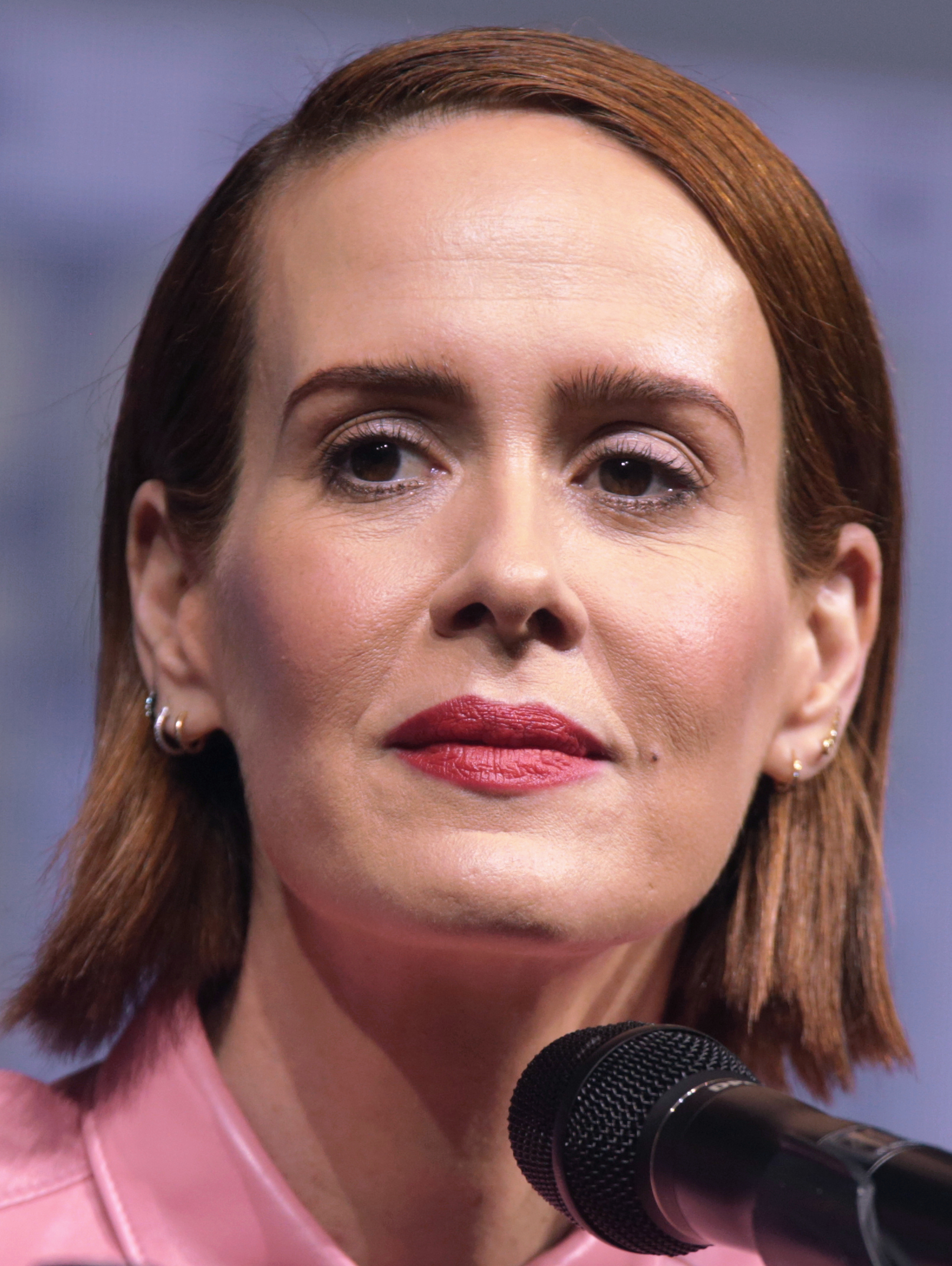
Sarah Paulson

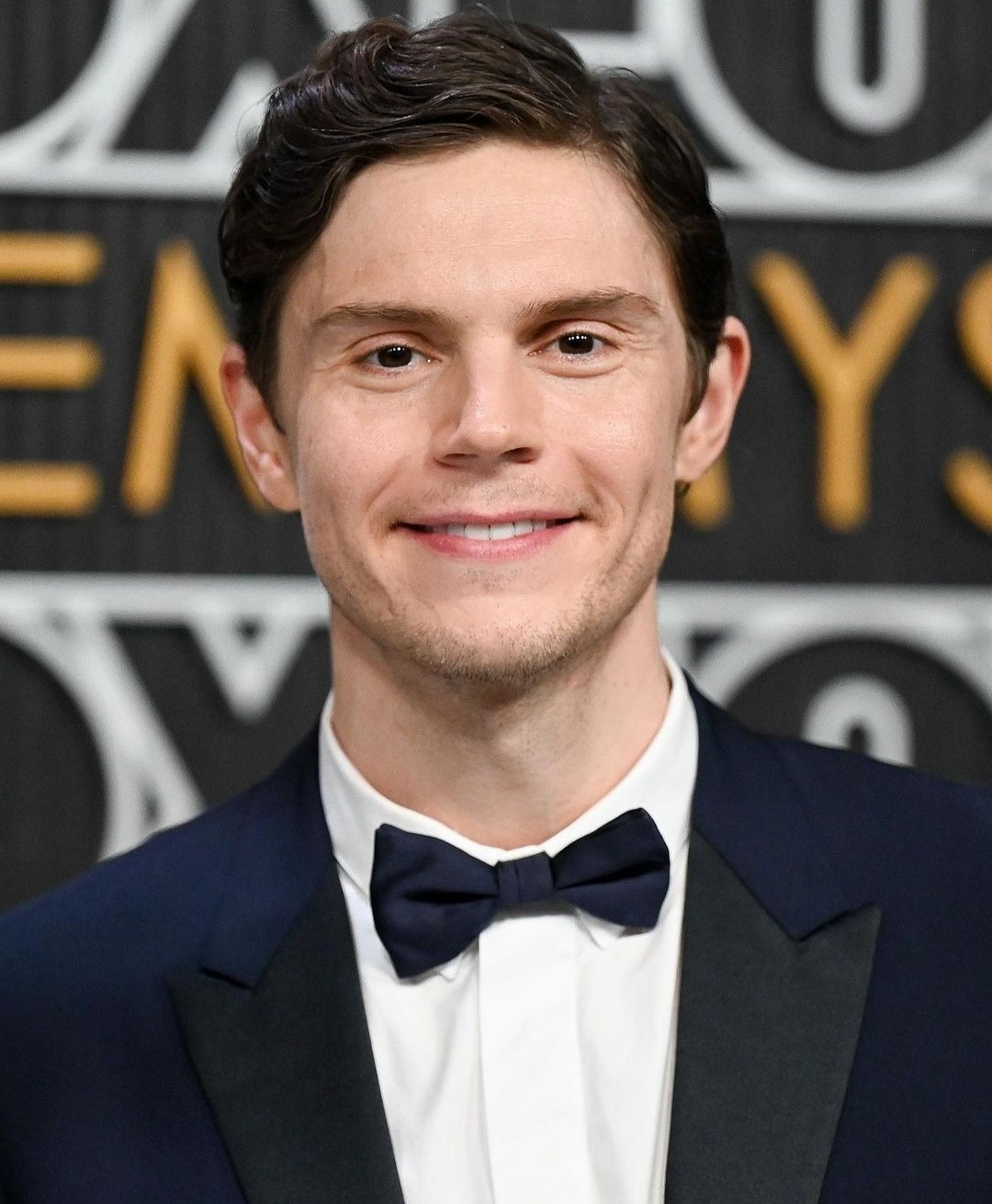
Evan Peters

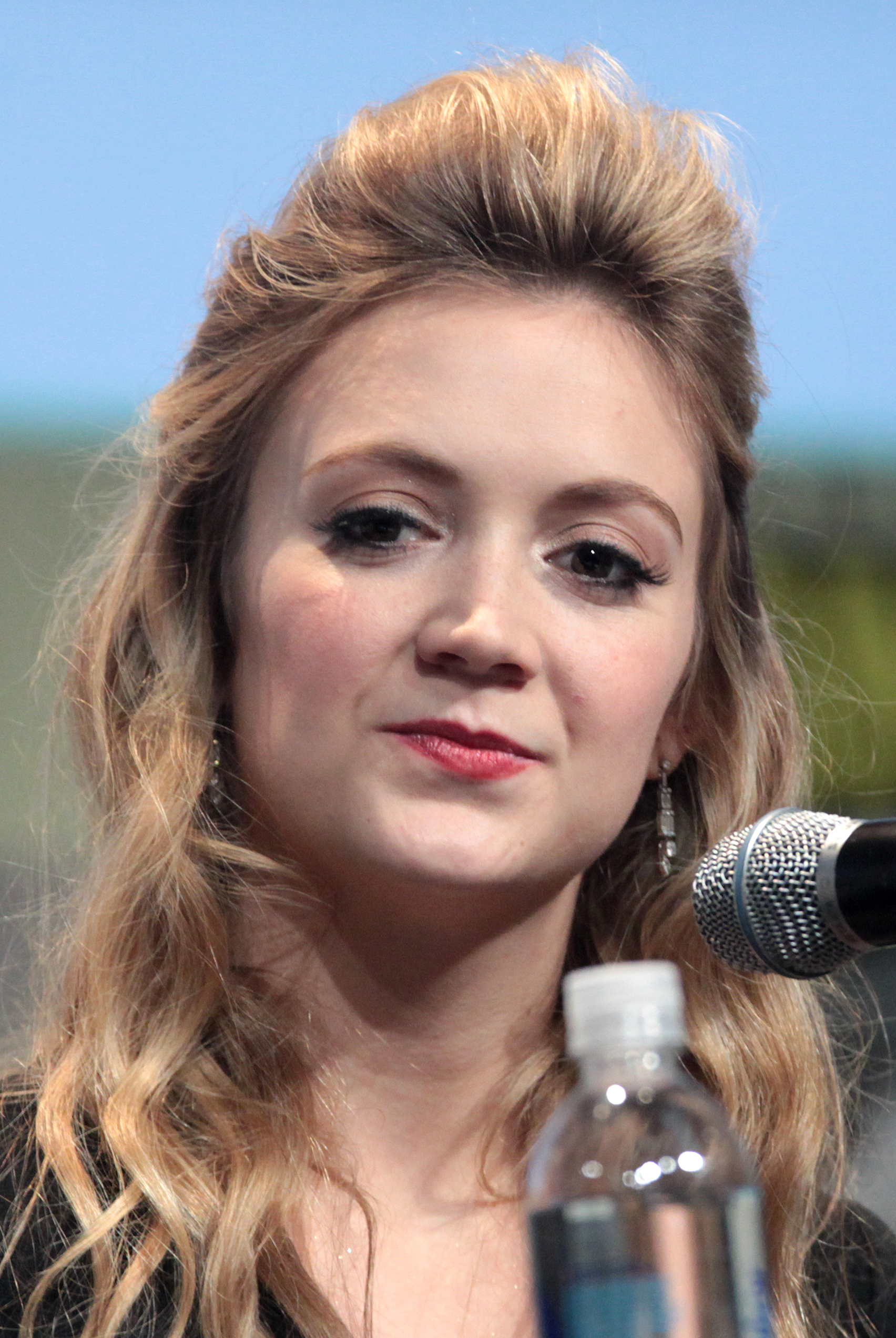
Billie Lourd

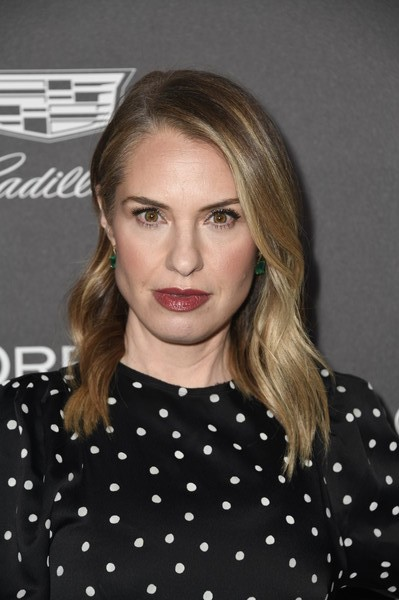
Leslie Grossman

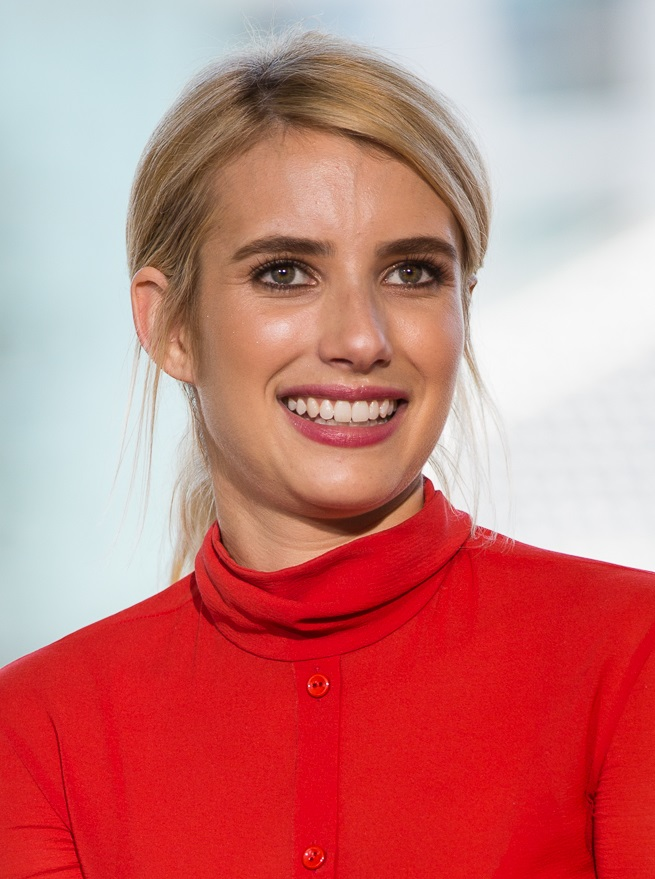
Emma Roberts

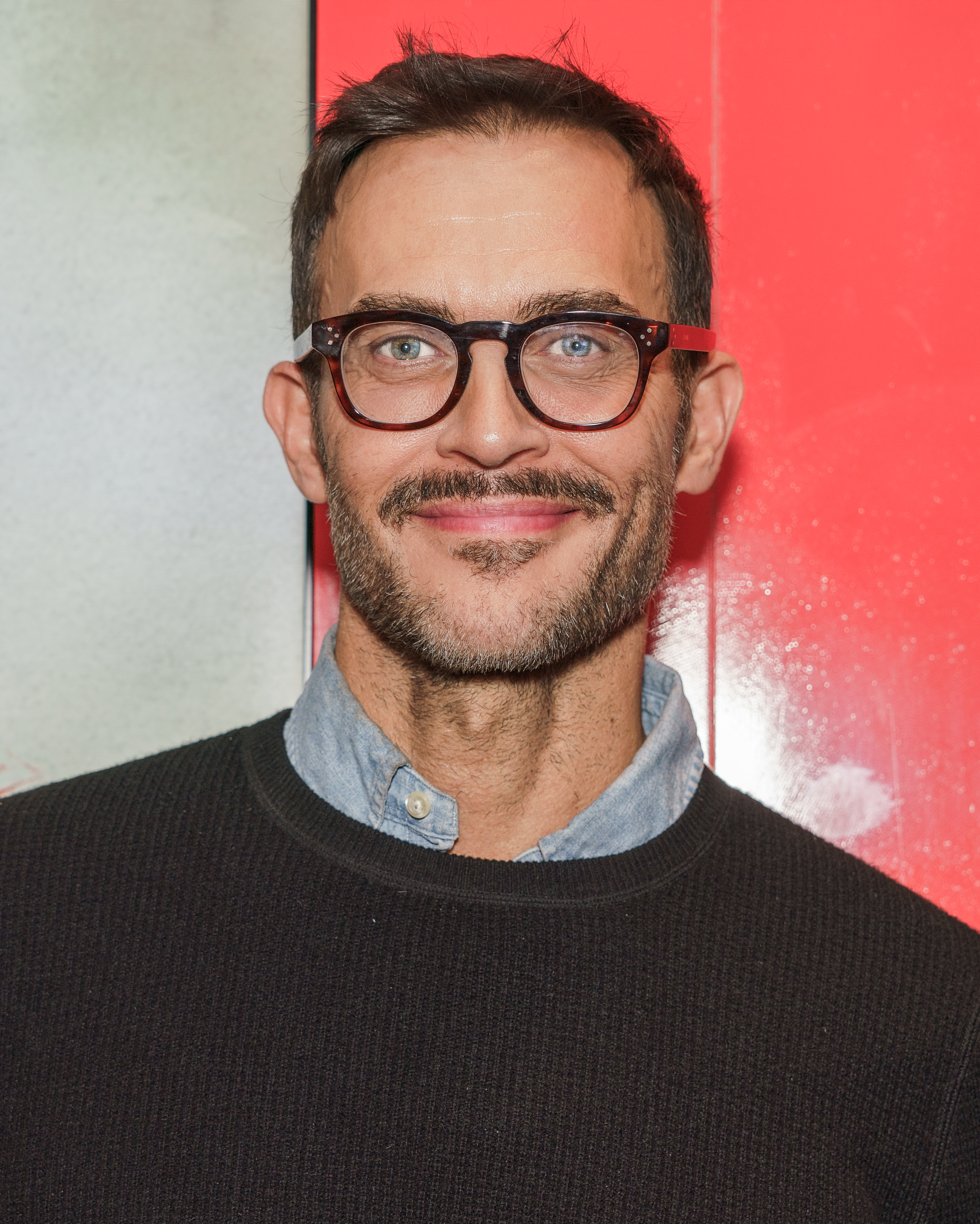
Cheyenne Jackson

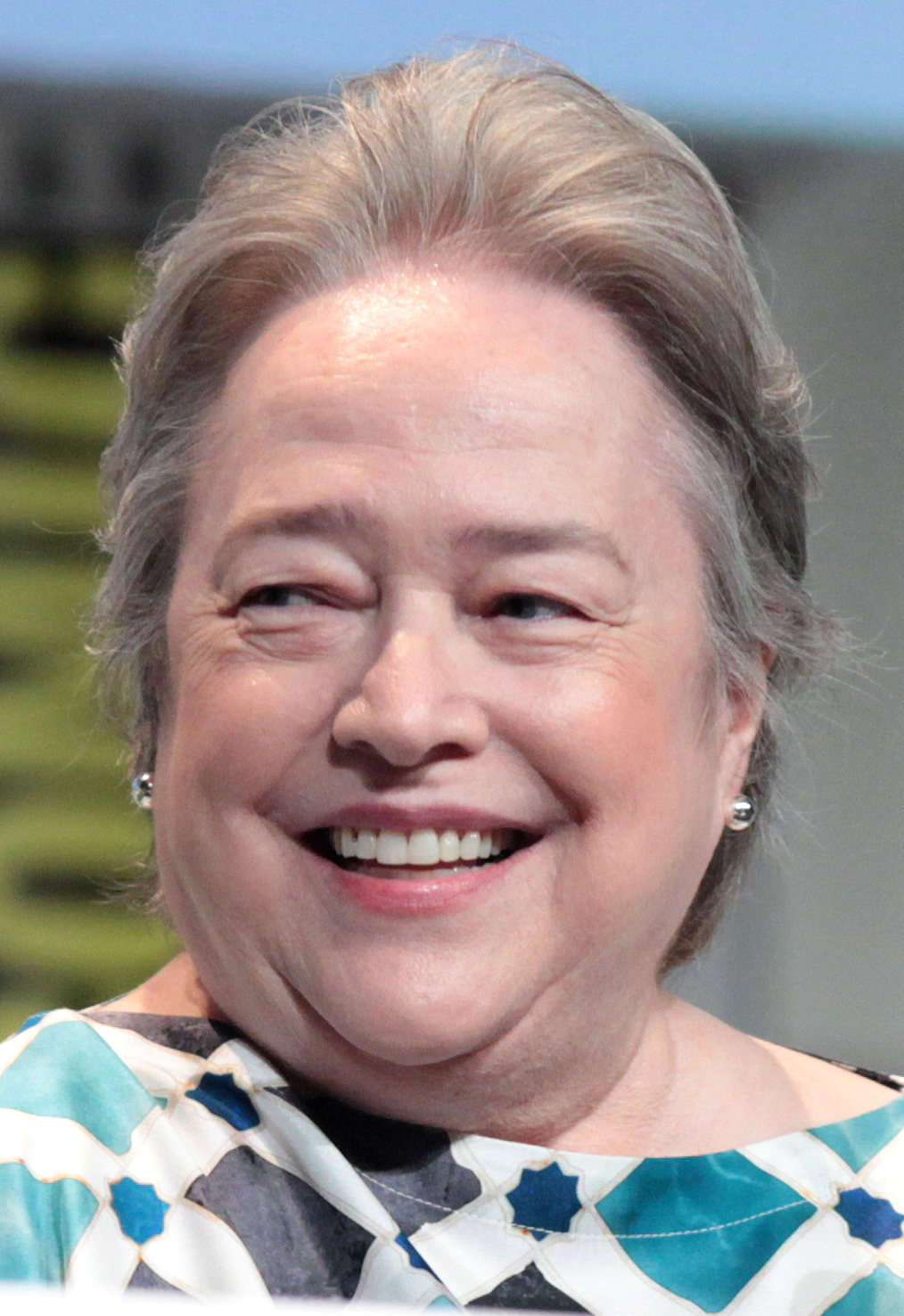
Kathy Bates

- Sarah Paulson as
  - Ms. Wilhemina Venable
  - Cordelia Goode
  - Billie Dean Howard
- Evan Peters as
  - Malcolm Gallant
  - James Patrick March
  - Tate Langdon
  - Jeff Pfister
- Adina Porter as Dinah Stevens
- Billie Lourd as Mallory Redmond
- Leslie Grossman as Coco St. Pierre Vanderbilt
- Cody Fern as Michael Langdon
- Emma Roberts as Madison Montgomery
- Cheyenne Jackson as John Henry Moore
- Kathy Bates as
  - Ms. Miriam Mead
  - Delphine LaLaurie

=== Special guest stars ===
- Frances Conroy as
  - Myrtle Snow
  - Moira O'Hara
- Lily Rabe as Misty Day
- Stevie Nicks as herself
- Jessica Lange as Constance Langdon
- Dylan McDermott as Dr. Ben Harmon
- Connie Britton as Vivien Harmon
- Angela Bassett as Marie Laveau

=== Recurring ===
- Joan Collins as
  - Evie Gallant
  - Bubbles McGee
- Billy Eichner as
  - Brock
  - Mutt Nutter
- Kyle Allen as Timothy Campbell
- Ash Santos as Emily Campbell
- Jeffrey Bowyer-Chapman as Andre Stevens
- Erika Ervin as the Fist
- Gabourey Sidibe as Queenie
- Taissa Farmiga as
  - Zoe Benson
  - Violet Harmon
- Jamie Brewer as Nan
- Naomi Grossman as Samantha Crowe
- Billy Porter as Behold Chablis
- Jon Jon Briones as Ariel Augustus
- BD Wong as Baldwin Pennypacker
- Carlo Rota as Anton LaVey

=== Guest stars ===
- Dina Meyer as Nora Campbell
- Travis Schuldt as Mr. Campbell
- John Getz as Mr. St. Pierre Vanderbilt
- Chad James Buchanan as Stu
- Wayne Pére as Mr. Kingery
- Mena Suvari as Elizabeth Short
- Sam Kinsey as Beau Langdon
- Celia Finkelstein as Gladys
- Lance Reddick as Papa Legba
- Sandra Bernhard as High Priestess Hannah Putt
- Harriet Sansom Harris as Madelyn Lurch
- Dominic Burgess as Phil Devlin
- Yevgeniy Kartashov as Yakov Yurovsky
- Mark Ivanir as Nicholas II of Russia
- Emilia Ares as Anastasia Nikolaevna of Russia

== Episodes ==
No. overall	No. in season	Title	Directed by	Written by	Original release date	Prod. code	US viewers (millions)
85	1	"The End"	Bradley Buecker	Ryan Murphy & Brad Falchuk	September 12, 2018	8ATS01	3.08
In the near future, nuclear missiles destroy the world and start a nuclear winter. Thanks to her family's private plane, billionaire socialite Coco St. Pierre Vanderbilt manages to escape the destruction of Los Angeles with her assistant Mallory, her hairdresser Malcolm Gallant, and his grandmother, Evie. Coco's boyfriend Brock tries to meet with the plane but is stranded in Los Angeles. Meanwhile, an organization known as "The Cooperative" selects young adults to save from the apocalypse, based on their genetic makeup. Two of the selected, Timothy and Emily, are sent to Outpost 3, an underground base led by Ms. Wilhemina Venable and her assistant Ms. Mead. There, they are reunited with other survivors, including Coco, Mallory, Malcolm, and Evie. Life at the Outpost includes strict rules and severe punishments. Eighteen months pass and the situation and food supplies are in critical condition at the Outpost. A man from the Cooperative, Michael Langdon, arrives and announces that he will judge who deserves to be truly saved.
86	2	"The Morning After"	Jennifer Lynch	James Wong	September 19, 2018	8ATS02	2.21
Langdon introduces himself to the guests of Outpost 3 and explains his duty. He asks Gallant about his sexual orientation and his hatred towards his grandmother. Later, the Rubber Man approaches Gallant in his bedroom, and Evie catches the two having sex. She reports their insubordination to Ms. Mead. Timothy and Emily discover recent Cooperative e-mails detailing Venable's transgressions against proper Outpost protocol. Gallant refuses to reveal the identity of the Rubber Man to Venable. Gallant assures Langdon that he did not reveal his identity, and Langdon asserts that he is not the Rubber Man and would never have sex with him. Timothy and Emily cast aspersions on the rules of Outpost 3, and they have sex for the first time. The Rubber Man attempts to seduce Gallant once again, and Gallant stabs him with scissors. Langdon appears, and Gallant finds himself looking upon his grandmother's bloody corpse. Timothy and Emily are caught in bed and are sentenced to death. Timothy shoots Mead in the stomach, and her wound reveals internal wiring and white liquid.
87	3	"Forbidden Fruit"	Loni Peristere	Manny Coto	September 26, 2018	8ATS03	1.95
Langdon unveils his true demonic form to Mallory, and she makes flames shoot from a fireplace. Venable confides to Mead that she has not been selected to move on to the Sanctuary and Mead suggests they kill everyone. Brock navigates a nuclear wasteland and guns down a cannibalistic tribe. He then beholds a horse-drawn carriage pass by. The carriage delivers apples to Outpost 3, and Venable resolves to inject them with venom. Brock infiltrates Outpost 3 and attends Venable's Halloween masquerade ball. Coco, presuming Brock to be Langdon in costume, seduces him back to her bedroom. Brock then reveals himself to Coco and stabs her in the forehead. The Outpost 3 guests bob for poisonous apples. Venable instructs everyone to wait to eat simultaneously. The guests comply and concurrently succumb to the poison. Venable and Mead confront Langdon, and Venable proclaims that they will be making the selections. Mead attempts to shoot Langdon but finds herself turning the gun on Venable against her will and shooting her, under the order of Langdon. Langdon reveals that he created Mead and that she was modeled after a caregiver from his childhood, which consoles her. Later, Cordelia Goode, Madison Montgomery, and Myrtle Snow descend upon Outpost 3 and Cordelia resurrects Mallory, Dinah, and Coco.
88	4	"Could It Be... Satan?"	Sheree Folkson	Tim Minear	October 3, 2018	8ATS04	2.02
Three years before the nuclear blast, the Hawthorne School for Exceptional Young Men (a school for warlocks and the future Outpost 3) seeks out Michael Langdon, who has been arrested for killing a man who insulted the woman Mead is modeled after, as well as the arresting officer. He is put through several tests and displays tremendous abilities. At Miss Robichaux's Academy, Zoe is impressed by Mallory's skill at witchcraft. The Coven is summoned to Hawthorne for a meeting, and Cordelia scoffs at the Grand Chancellor's suspicion that Michael may be the first male Supreme, known as the Alpha. To prove his power, Michael saves Queenie from eternal damnation at the Hotel Cortez (which Cordelia was previously unable to do) and fetches Madison from her personal hell.
89	5	"Boy Wonder"	Gwyneth Horder-Payton	John J. Gray	October 10, 2018	8ATS05	2.12
Cordelia has a frightening vision of a destroyed Miss Robichaux's Academy and being attacked by disease-ridden people. Later, she announces that Langdon will take the Seven Wonders, something that she is berated for by Myrtle. Mallory's abilities soon intensify, and Cordelia reveals that she is dying and slowly losing her Supremacy. John Henry Moore discovers Langdon's true self, but Mead interferes before he can warn anyone and kills him. During the test, Cordelia asks Langdon to bring Misty Day back to life, so he breaks her out of her personal hell. It is revealed that Cordelia has been planning an army against Langdon and used him to resurrect her students. Later, Cordelia asks Madison and a suspicious Behold to investigate Langdon's origins at the Murder House.
90	6	"Return to Murder House"	Sarah Paulson	Crystal Liu	October 17, 2018	8ATS06	2.01
Madison and Behold buy the Murder House on behalf of the Coven, under the pretense that they are a married couple. They cast a spell to force the spirits of the house to appear to them. They encounter the ghost of Constance Langdon, who agrees to provide information on her grandson Michael if they banish her old nemesis, Moira O'Hara, from the house. Madison and Behold exhume Moira's bones and bury them with her mother's; Moira is then set free from the house. Constance tells them that she sensed evil in Michael from very early on. In his youth, he began killing animals and then his babysitter. After Michael ages ten years overnight, Constance enlists the help of a Catholic priest, whom Michael kills. Constance, out of hopelessness, commits suicide in the Murder House, where she is reunited with Tate, Beauregard, and her fourth child, a little girl with no eyes. Madison and Behold then interview Ben and Vivien Harmon, who further reveal the evil in Michael's soul. Vivien tells them that Michael's father is neither Ben nor Tate but the evil of the Murder House. Before leaving with Behold, Madison reunites Tate and Violet.
91	7	"Traitor"	Jennifer Lynch	Adam Penn	October 24, 2018	8ATS07	1.85
With the help of voodoo queen Dinah Stevens, Cordelia arranges a meeting with Papa Legba in an attempt to prevent Langdon's plans. Legba reveals that he owns Nan's soul and agrees to help entrap Langdon under the condition that Cordelia give him the souls of the remaining girls. Cordelia refuses, and Legba disappears. To learn more about the warlocks and their plans, Madison enlists the help of Myrtle's long-time friend, witch-actress Bubbles McGee, who specializes in reading the thoughts and souls of others. At a dinner party held by Myrtle, Bubbles discovers that Ariel and Baldwin know about the death of John Henry and that they are planning to kill the women of the coven. Zoe suspects Mallory to be the true next Supreme after she saves Coco from choking, and confides in Cordelia. Later, Mallory passes the Seven Wonders after successfully resurrecting John Henry. The coven then captures Ariel, Baldwin, and Mead and burns them at the stake for their betrayals.
92	8	"Sojourn"	Bradley Buecker	Josh Green	October 31, 2018	8ATS08	1.63
After breaking down over Mead's charred remains, Langdon is confronted by Cordelia, who informs him that a spell hides Mead's soul. Langdon, unable to bring her back, flees into the forest seeking guidance from Satan. Unsuccessfully, Langdon remains strong but confused and is led to an obscure Satanic church in the city. At the church, he meets Madelyn, who takes him to her home and offers him food. At her house, Madelyn tells Langdon that she has secured everything in life by selling her soul. Langdon reveals that he is the Antichrist, and Madelyn takes him back to the church, where the congregation falls at his feet in worship. Langdon tells his followers that he has no ambition or plan now that Mead is dead, despite their willingness to help usher in the end of times. Madelyn takes Langdon to a robotics corporation run by engineers Mutt and Jeff, who have sold their souls the same way the other Satanists have. It is revealed that Ms. Venable worked for the corporation before the nuclear blast and that Mutt and Jeff were responsible for creating Mead's android.
93	9	"Fire and Reign"	Jennifer Arnold	Asha Michelle Wilson	November 7, 2018	8ATS09	1.65
Dinah helps Langdon and Mead infiltrate the Coven in exchange for Satan green-lighting her talk show. Mead kills most of the witches, including Queenie, Bubbles, and Zoe. The remaining girls take refuge in Misty's swamp-shack, where Cordelia is unable to resurrect them as Langdon destroyed their souls. Myrtle tells them of an ancient spell that can undo past events and asks Mallory to travel to Russia in 1918 and save Grand Duchess Anastasia Nikolaevna, a witch, from her execution. Mallory's attempt to save Anastasia fails, although Myrtle notes that she is the first witch to travel through time successfully. Because of Mallory's near-success, Cordelia contemplates her own death so Mallory can rise as the new Supreme, but Myrtle discourages her. Cordelia and Myrtle find that Langdon has murdered all the warlocks, including John Henry and Behold, at Hawthorne's School. Mutt and Jeff, who have been controlling Mead the whole time, meet with Langdon and inform him that the Cooperative is the ancient Order of the Illuminati, an organization made up of world elites that have sold their souls to Satan. Langdon meets with the Illuminati, informing them of the Outposts and plans the end of times.
94	10	"Apocalypse Then"	Bradley Buecker	Ryan Murphy & Brad Falchuk	November 14, 2018	8ATS10	1.83
After discovering Langdon's plan for the Outposts, the Coven decides to hide Coco and Mallory in Outpost 3 by giving them new identities and making sure they survive the apocalypse while Mallory's powers are growing. After discovering Dinah's involvement with Langdon, Cordelia, Myrtle, and Madison bury themselves in the swamp mud to survive the nuclear blast. After the apocalypse, the Coven faces Langdon. As Dinah pledges allegiance to Langdon, a newly regenerated Marie Laveau kills her for her betrayal. Cordelia then destroys Mead while Madison shoots Langdon to buy time for Mallory's time travel spell. While Langdon kills Madison, Marie, and Coco, Mallory is stabbed by Brock, prompting Cordelia to sacrifice herself to allow Mallory's rise as the new Supreme. Mallory casts the spell and returns to 2015, where she runs over a younger Langdon multiple times before he came into his full powers. Michael begs Constance to take him to the Murder House to preserve his spirit, but she refuses, thus preventing the apocalypse. Mallory eventually returns to Miss Robichaux's Academy, saving Queenie and Misty from their future fates. Meanwhile, Timothy and Emily meet in the new present and, years later, have a son together, who later kills his nanny. Anton LaVey, Samantha Crowe, and Mead visit them claiming they came to help.

== Production ==
=== Development ===
On January 12, 2017, the series was renewed for an eighth season, which premiered on September 12, 2018. In October 2016, series co-creator Ryan Murphy announced a "crossover" season between previous cycles Murder House and Coven. In January 2018, he stated that the ninth season would most likely feature the crossover; however, in June 2018, he announced that the eighth season was chosen instead. Murphy has also stated that the eighth season would be set 18 months in the future and would feature an Asylum and Coven tone. In July 2018, it was announced at San Diego Comic-Con that the title of the season would be Apocalypse.

In April 2018, it was revealed that series veteran Sarah Paulson and Evan Peters would make their directorial debut in an episode. It was later revealed that Paulson would direct the sixth episode. Peters, in the end, did not direct an episode.

As with previous seasons, several teasers were released. On September 4, 2018, a short trailer was released, followed by a longer trailer the next day.

=== Casting ===
In October 2017, it was announced that series mainstay Sarah Paulson would return for the season. In March 2018, it was announced that Kathy Bates and Evan Peters would also return, leading the season with Paulson. In April 2018, Joan Collins joined the cast as the grandmother of Peters' character. In April and May 2018, Cult actors Adina Porter, Cheyenne Jackson, Billy Eichner, Leslie Grossman, and Billie Lourd were also confirmed to return.

In June 2018, Emma Roberts revealed that she would return for Apocalypse, reprising her role as Madison Montgomery from Coven. That same month, Murphy revealed that other witches from Coven had all been invited to return, and also stated that he had asked Anjelica Huston to join the cast, while Paulson confirmed that she would reprise her Coven role, Cordelia Goode. In July 2018, it was reported that Jeffrey Bowyer-Chapman and Kyle Allen would guest star in the season. Later that month, Murphy revealed via Twitter that American Crime Story actor Cody Fern joined the cast as a grown-up Michael Langdon, the Antichrist born during the events of Murder House.

In August 2018, Pose actor Billy Porter announced via Instagram that he would appear in the season. Later, during the Television Critics Association press tour, it was announced that Jessica Lange would appear in the season's sixth episode as her Murder House character, Constance Langdon. After FX released the season's first teaser, actress Lesley Fera revealed via Twitter that she would appear in the season premiere. Later, Ryan Murphy confirmed via Twitter that Taissa Farmiga, Gabourey Sidibe, Lily Rabe, Frances Conroy, and Stevie Nicks would all appear during the season, and that they would all reprise the roles they played in Coven. In the same month, Angela Bassett, who appeared in four previous seasons, confirmed that she would not appear in the season; however, Bassett appeared in the last episode of the season, playing Marie Laveau, the role she played in Coven. Later, Finn Wittrock, who appeared in three past seasons, confirmed that he would not appear in Apocalypse. The same day, it was announced that original cast members Connie Britton and Dylan McDermott would be returning for the season, and Ryan Murphy later confirmed that they would reprise their Murder House roles, Vivien and Ben Harmon, respectively. Later, Murphy revealed that Evan Peters and Taissa Farmiga would be reprising their Murder House roles, Tate Langdon and Violet Harmon, respectively.

In September 2018, it was revealed that Erika Ervin would be returning for Apocalypse after having a recurring role in Freak Show. It was also reported that actress Ash Santos would appear in the season.

=== Filming ===
In April 2018, Murphy revealed that filming for the season would begin in June 2018.

== Release ==
=== Home media ===
American Horror Story: Apocalypse – The Complete Eight Season
Set Details
10 Episodes; 3 Disc Set (DVD); 3 Disc Set (BD); English & Spanish 5.1 Dolby Digital, French 2.0 Surround; Subtitles: English SDH, Spanish, French; Runtime: 431 Minutes
Release Dates
Region 1	Region 2	Region 4
September 24, 2019	August 26, 2019	August 7, 2019

== Reception ==
=== Ratings ===
Viewership and ratings per episode of American Horror Story: Apocalypse
No.	Title	Air date	Rating (18–49)	Viewers (millions)	DVR (18–49)	DVR viewers (millions)	Total (18–49)	Total viewers (millions)
1	"The End"	September 12, 2018	1.5	3.08	1.5	3.17	3.0	6.26
2	"The Morning After"	September 19, 2018	1.1	2.21	1.2	2.41	2.3	4.63 (Note: Live +7 ratings were not available, so Live +3 ratings have been used instead.)
3	"Forbidden Fruit"	September 26, 2018	0.9	1.95	—N/a	—N/a	—N/a	—N/a
4	"Could It Be... Satan?"	October 3, 2018	1.0	2.02	1.6	3.05	2.6	5.08
5	"Boy Wonder"	October 10, 2018	1.0	2.12	1.4	2.82	2.4	4.95
6	"Return to Murder House"	October 17, 2018	0.9	2.01	1.2	2.40	2.1	4.41
7	"Traitor"	October 24, 2018	0.9	1.85	1.1	2.20	2.0	4.07
8	"Sojourn"	October 31, 2018	0.7	1.63	1.1	2.12	1.8	3.75
9	"Fire and Reign"	November 7, 2018	0.8	1.65	1.1	2.19	1.9	3.84
10	"Apocalypse Then"	November 14, 2018	0.8	1.83	1.1	2.24	1.9	4.07

=== Critical response ===
American Horror Story: Apocalypse received positive reviews, with many considering it as an improvement over the recent seasons. The review aggregator Rotten Tomatoes gave the season a 79% approval rating, with an average rating of 6.95/10, based on 194 reviews. The critical consensus reads, "Ryan Murphy and his murderers' row of witchy performers literally save the world -- and franchise -- in Apocalypse, the series' most ambitious crossover swing yet." On Metacritic, the season was given a score of 63 out of 100 based on 6 reviews, indicating "generally favorable" reviews.

American Horror Story season 8: Critical reception by episode
Season 8 (2018): Percentage of positive critics' reviews tracked by the website Rotten Tomatoes

=== Ratings ===
Viewership and ratings per episode of American Horror Story: Apocalypse
No.	Title	Air date	Rating (18–49)	Viewers (millions)	DVR (18–49)	DVR viewers (millions)	Total (18–49)	Total viewers (millions)
1	"The End"	September 12, 2018	1.5	3.08	1.5	3.17	3.0	6.26
2	"The Morning After"	September 19, 2018	1.1	2.21	1.2	2.41	2.3	4.63
3	"Forbidden Fruit"	September 26, 2018	0.9	1.95	—N/a	—N/a	—N/a	—N/a
4	"Could It Be... Satan?"	October 3, 2018	1.0	2.02	1.6	3.05	2.6	5.08
5	"Boy Wonder"	October 10, 2018	1.0	2.12	1.4	2.82	2.4	4.95
6	"Return to Murder House"	October 17, 2018	0.9	2.01	1.2	2.40	2.1	4.41
7	"Traitor"	October 24, 2018	0.9	1.85	—N/a	—N/a	—N/a	—N/a
8	"Sojourn"	October 31, 2018	0.7	1.63	—N/a	—N/a	—N/a	—N/a
9	"Fire and Reign"	November 7, 2018	0.8	1.65	—N/a	—N/a	—N/a	—N/a
10	"Apocalypse Then"	November 14, 2018	0.8	1.83	—N/a	—N/a	—N/a	—N/a

Nielsen Media Research, which records streaming viewership on certain U.S. television screens, reported that American Horror Story: Apocalypse garnered 432 million minutes of watch time, averaging 43.2 million minutes viewed per episode, between May 1, 2024, and August 31, 2026.

=== Awards and nominations ===
In its eighth season, the series has been nominated for 20 awards. Five of them were won.

Year	Association	Category	Nominee(s)	Result
2019	10th Dorian Awards	Campy TV Show of the Year	American Horror Story: Apocalypse	Nominated
2019	23rd Art Directors Guild Awards	Television Movie or Mini-Series	Valdar Wilt (for "Fire and Reign")	Nominated
2019	21st Costume Designers Guild Awards	Excellence in Sci-Fi/Fantasy Television	Paula Bradley, Lou Eyrich	Nominated
2019	2019 Make-Up Artists and Hair Stylists Guild Awards	TV Miniseries or Movie Made for TV: Best Contemporary Make-Up	Eryn Krueger Mekash, Kim Ayers, Silvina Knight	Won
2019	2019 Make-Up Artists and Hair Stylists Guild Awards	TV Miniseries or Movie Made for TV: Best Contemporary Hair Styling	Michelle Ceglia, Helena Cepeda, Romaine Markus-Meyers	Nominated
2019	2019 Make-Up Artists and Hair Stylists Guild Awards	TV Miniseries or Movie Made for TV: Best Period and/or Character Hair Styling	Michelle Ceglia, Helena Cepeda, Lydia Fantini	Nominated
2019	2019 Make-Up Artists and Hair Stylists Guild Awards	TV Miniseries or Movie Made for TV: Best Special Make-Up Effects	Eryn Krueger Mekash, Mike Mekash, David Anderson	Nominated
2019	2019 Make-Up Artists and Hair Stylists Guild Awards	Commercials and Music Videos: Best Make-Up	Kerry Herta, Jason Collins, Cristina Waltz (for "Promo")	Won
2019	2019 Make-Up Artists and Hair Stylists Guild Awards	Commercials and Music Videos: Best Hair Styling	Joe Matke, Fernando Santaella-Navarro (for "Promo")	Won
2019	66th Golden Reel Awards	Outstanding Achievement in Sound Editing – Episodic Short Form – Music / Musical	David Klotz (for "The End")	Won
2019	21st Fangoria Chainsaw Awards	Best Series	American Horror Story: Apocalypse	Nominated
2019	30th GLAAD Media Awards	Outstanding TV Movie or Limited Series	American Horror Story: Apocalypse	Nominated
2019	45th Saturn Awards	Best Horror Television Series	American Horror Story: Apocalypse	Nominated
2019	71st Primetime Creative Arts Emmy Awards	Outstanding Guest Actress in a Drama Series	Jessica Lange (for "Return to Murder House")	Nominated
2019	71st Primetime Creative Arts Emmy Awards	Outstanding Fantasy/Sci-Fi Costumes	Lou Eyrich, Paula Bradley, Rebecca Guzzi, Charlene Amateau (for "Forbidden Fruit")	Nominated
2019	71st Primetime Creative Arts Emmy Awards	Outstanding Hairstyling for a Single-Camera Series	Michelle Ceglia, Helena Cepeda, Lydia Fantani, Romaine Markus-Meyers (for "Forbidden Fruit")	Nominated
2019	71st Primetime Creative Arts Emmy Awards	Outstanding Makeup for a Single-Camera Series (Non-Prosthetic)	Eryn Krueger Mekash, Kim Ayers, Michael Mekash, Silvina Knight, Jamie Leigh Devilla (for "Forbidden Fruit")	Nominated
2019	71st Primetime Creative Arts Emmy Awards	Outstanding Prosthetic Makeup for a Series, Limited Series, Movie or Special	Eryn Krueger Mekash, Michael Mekash, Steve LaPorte, Jake Garber, Vance Hartwell, Silvina Knight, Glen Eisner, David Leroy Anderson (for "Apocalypse Then")	Nominated
2019	17th Gold Derby Awards	Best Drama Guest Actor	Dylan McDermott	Nominated
2019	17th Gold Derby Awards	Best Drama Guest Actress	Jessica Lange	Won
