= Cold Snap (Dexter: New Blood) =

- Dexter: New Blood episode
- Dexter Morgan (Michael C. Hall) kills Matt Caldwell (Steve M. Robertson), killing for the first time after a decade.
- Episode no.: Episode 1
- Directed by: Marcos Siega
- Story by: Clyde Phillips & Adam Rapp
- Teleplay by: Clyde Phillips
- Cinematography by: Hillary Fyfe Spera
- Editing by: Perri Frank
- Original air date: November 7, 2021
- Running time: 57 minutes

Guest appearances
- Fredric Lehne as Edward Olsen; David Magidoff as Teddy; Katy Sullivan as Esther; Michael Cyril Creighton as Fred Jr.; Gizel Jiménez as Tess; Steve M. Robertson as Matt Caldwell

Episode chronology
← Previous —	Next → "Storm of Fuck"

"Cold Snap" is the first episode of the American television miniseries Dexter: New Blood, a continuation of the series Dexter. The episode was written by series developer Clyde Phillips from a story by Phillips and Adam Rapp and directed by executive producer Marcos Siega. It originally aired on Showtime on November 7, 2021, being also available on its streaming service at midnight on the same day.

The series follows Dexter Morgan after having faked his death on the original series finale. Dexter now lives in the fictional small town of Iron Lake, New York, hiding his identity under the name of Jim Lindsay, a local shopkeeper and having suppressed his killing urges. He is now in a relationship with Angela Bishop, the town's chief of police, and is beloved and respected in the town. A local troublemaker and the arrival of a mysterious person cause friction in his new life, as the past comes back to haunt him.

Development on the series started following the negative reception to the original series finale on 2013. Showtime president David Nevins said that a potential follow-up to the series was ongoing in 2014, but no further updates were mentioned. Showtime contacted Clyde Phillips, the showrunner for the first four seasons, in 2019, to start working on a potential revival of the series. The series was announced in October 2020, with Phillips and Hall confirming their return. Despite being a follow-up to the eighth season, Phillips did not consider the series as a ninth season due to the distance in narrative time and new series location.

According to Nielsen Media Research, the episode was seen by an estimated 0.678 million household viewers and gained a 0.2 ratings share among adults aged 18–49. It was, however, watched by 2.2 million viewers across linear and streaming platforms, becoming the most-watched Showtime title ever on an over-the-top media service. Critical reception to the episode was mixed. Critics praised Michael C. Hall's performance and deemed the episode a return to form following a disappointing finale. Others criticized the episode's writing, with many finding it predictable and lacking surprises, and many deemed that the series felt "pointless".

== Plot ==
In Iron Lake, New York, Dexter Morgan (Michael C. Hall), going by the name Jim Lindsay, is running through the snowy woods with a rifle, periodically looking at an albino stag through the scope. His imaginary companion is now his sister Debra (Jennifer Carpenter).

On his way into town, Dexter is pulled over by Angela Bishop (Julia Jones), the small town's chief of police. They have sex in Angela's car before Angela is called away. Dexter arrives at his job at Fred's Fish and Game. A young customer, Matt Caldwell (Steve M. Robertson), arrives to buy a knife and a rifle. While Dexter sells him the knife, he must wait 24 hours before buying the rifle as his FBI background check is flagged. Matt tries to pressure Dexter, but leaves with only the knife.

That night, Dexter's date with Angela is interrupted when Audrey invites friends to their house, forcing Angela to leave early. At the bar, Matt approaches Dexter, presses him again about the rifle, and invites him to a party at his father's house the next day. A mysterious hitchhiker (Jack Alcott) arrives in town and begins stalking Dexter. The next morning, Dexter feels he is being watched as he again walks through the forest.

Petrol billionaire Edward Olsen (Fredric Lehne) holds a board meeting, which is met with a protest led by Audrey and attended by one out-of-towner in particular. Dexter's boss, Fred Jr. (Michael Cyril Creighton), has him deliver Matt's rifle to the party. Dexter arrives but is forced to wait while Matt has sex with a party-goer. His friend, jealous of the party-goer, snorts cocaine and admits to Dexter that an infamous boat accident that killed five people was not only Matt's fault, but also was not an accident. Belatedly regretting the admission, he asks Dexter not to tell anyone. Dexter delivers the rifle and begins to vet Matt.

Returning to his cabin, Dexter finds someone inside. Armed with an axe, he confronts the visitor, who reveals himself as his son Harrison. The vision of Debra reminds Dexter of all the deaths that plagued his previous life (Doakes, LaGuerta, Rita, and Debra herself), and "Jim" denies knowing the people Harrison is asking about, gives him money and sends him off. As Harrison leaves, Dexter stares at a photo of both when he was a baby and decides to burn it.

The following morning, Dexter encounters the white deer again. He approaches the stag and they bond. Suddenly, the stag is shot dead by a gleeful Matt, who runs up from a distance. Dexter snaps and hits Matt in the face with the butt of his rifle. He improvises a kill room in his shed and wakes Matt up. He confronts Matt about the stag and the boat accident. Matt admits the facts, but defends himself by blaming a troubled childhood and threatens that his father will kill Dexter when he finds out. Unfazed, Dexter stabs Matt, making his first kill in 10 years.

Dexter takes a trophy on a makeshift microscope slide made of two shards of glass, but decides to leave it with the corpse. He chops up Matt's body, placing it in bags, while the vision of Debra chastises him. Dexter then goes to town and finds Harrison. He admits to being his father and invites him "home". As they enter the house, a blood trail is seen outside the cabin.

== Production ==
=== Development ===
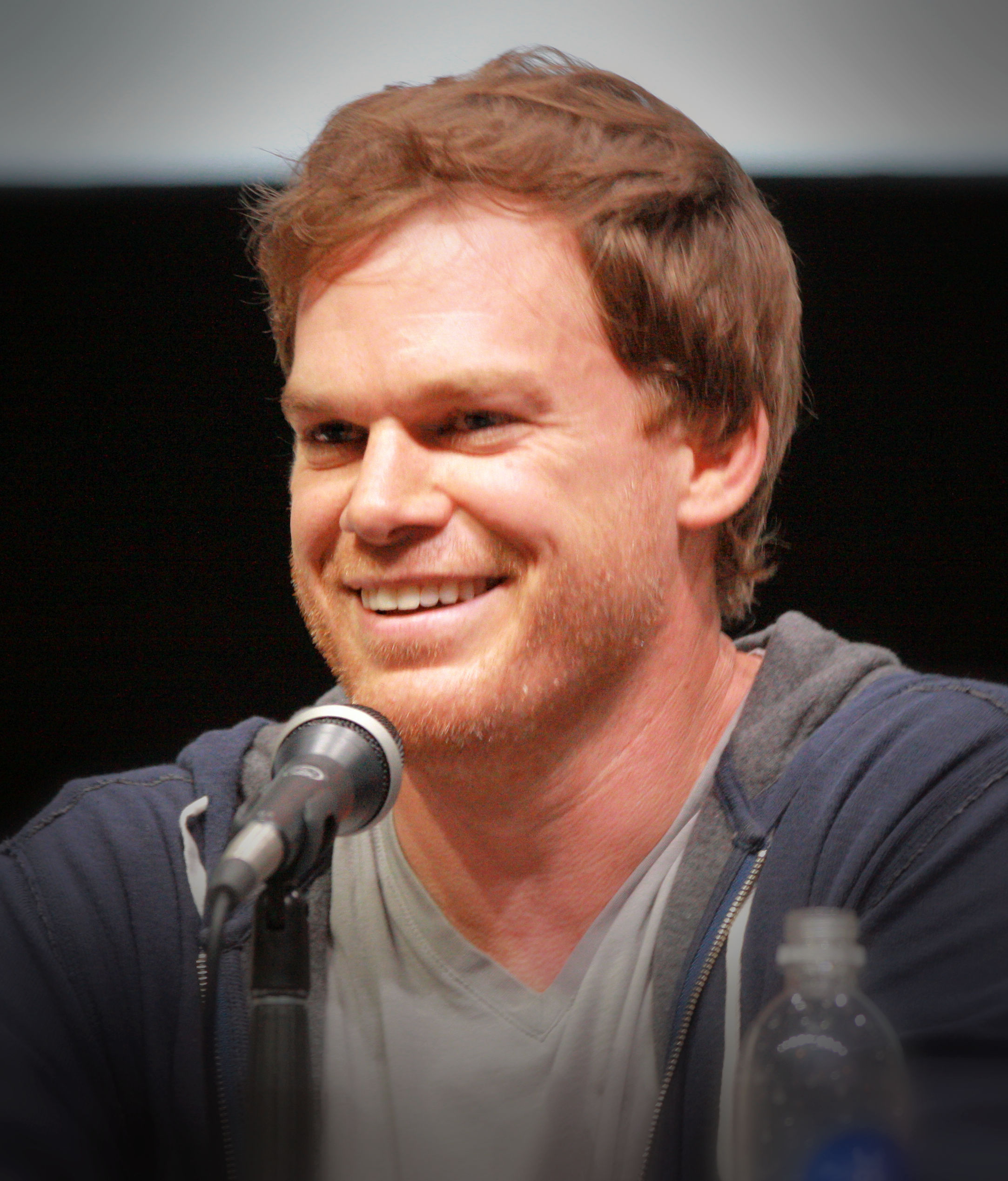
Series star Michael C. Hall deemed the original series finale, "mystifying at best."

On October 14, 2020, the Dexter revival was ordered as a limited series consisting of 10 episodes, starring Hall in his original role, with Phillips returning as showrunner. On November 17, 2020, Marcos Siega was announced to beset to direct the first six episodes of the limited series, as well to serve as an executive producer alongside Hall, John Goldwyn, Sara Colleton, Bill Carraro, and Scott Reynolds. In July 2021, the series was announced to premiere on November 7, 2021, on Showtime. In the United Kingdom, the series premiered on November 8, 2021, on Sky Atlantic.

The first episode of the revived series was announced in November 2021 to be titled "Cold Snap", and was to be directed by Marcos Siega and written by series developer Clyde Phillips from a story by Phillips and Adam Rapp. The episode marked Phillips' first writing credit for the series since the season-four premiere, "Living the Dream", and was his fifth writing credit for the series.

=== Writing ===
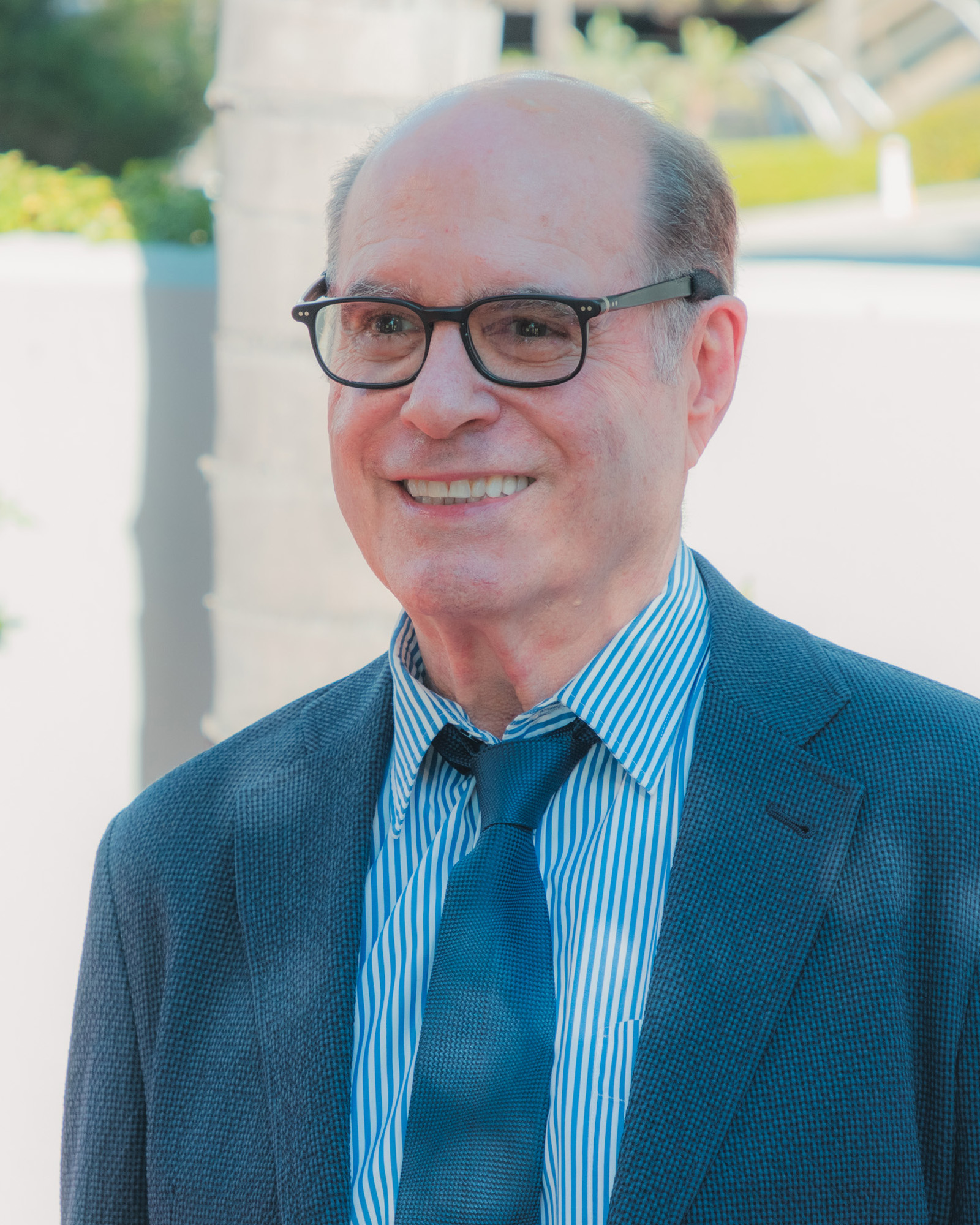
Clyde Phillips returns as showrunner, a position he held for the first four seasons of the original series.

Phillips recognized the ending had suited the time when it was broadcast, as around 2013, a number of real-life serial killers were known to be living in Oregon and nearby states. Phillips also considered that by surrounding himself with chainsaws, Dexter was under a constant reminder about how his mother had died. As Phillips was unsure of the intent that the finale was meant to deliver, he decided to incorporate a major timeskip, nearly a decade from the end of events of the original series. While Dexter is still a lumberjack, he had since moved to the fictional town of Iron Lake, New York. Because of that, Phillips did not consider the miniseries as a ninth season. As the writing staff wrote out the 10-episode miniseries, they established how the series would end and wrote backwards from that.

Phillips described the intention of skipping Dexter's narrations for most of the episode, "it makes the character accessible, vulnerable, it's also a great chance for humor. And to not have that as a tool in our toolbox, made it more challenging to write that first episode, but it's so worth the satisfaction of when he finally does talk and when 'tonight's the night' comes back."

Describing Dexter snapping and returning to his old persona, Hall explained, "Matt destroys this manifestation of Dexter's aspiration of purity. He shoots this deer at a time when it's the last thing Dexter has to hold on to. He's obviously been struggling with Matt and has felt tempted. I imagine when temptations like that have emerged in the past that maybe Dexter's left town, that he's moved on. But in this case he doesn't." Hall also felt exploring Dexter's relationship with his son Harrison was important, "the richness of that relationship and that exploration is a big part of what we're up to, and a big part of why this felt like a story worth telling. It felt like the right time."

=== Casting ===
The announcement of the series in October 2020 confirmed Hall's return as Dexter Morgan. In January 2021, Julia Jones, Alano Miller, Johnny Sequoyah, Jack Alcott, and David Magidoff joined the main cast. In February 2021, Oscar Wahlberg was cast in recurring roles.

In July 2021, Showtime announced that original series regular Jennifer Carpenter would reprise her role as Dexter's sister Debra in some capacity for the limited series. On August 24, 2021, it was reported that Carpenter is confirmed to reprise her role as a series regular, appearing as Dexter's "imaginary iteration of Debra". Hall described her return, "I don't think of her as a ghost per se, but more of a link or an echo or an inconvenient truth for Dexter. She comes back to sort of haunt and punish and caretake and provoke and love him." He further described her, "She's not bound by who we know Deb to be. She's an energy that's embodied by Deb, but she isn't bound by anything other than whatever emotional or psychological riptide is going on in Dexter's own head."

=== Filming ===
Production began in February 2021, with most of the show filmed in Shelburne Falls, Massachusetts, serving as a stand-in for Iron Lake. Exterior filming had to be coordinated around the weather, as the creators wanted to have a significant amount of snow in those shots, including a local frozen lake. Interior filming started around July 2021 over a 50-day period.

== Reception ==
=== Viewers ===
In its original American broadcast, "Cold Snap" was seen by an estimated 0.678 million household viewers and gained a 0.20 ratings share among adults aged 18–49, according to Nielsen Media Research. This means that 0.20 percent of all households with televisions watched the episode. This was a 76% decrease in viewership from the original series finale, which was watched by 2.80 million viewers with a 1.3 in the 18-49 demographics.

According to Showtime, the episode was watched by 2.2 million viewers across linear and streaming platforms, becoming the most-watched Showtime title ever on over-the-top media services and it was the year's most-watched scripted drama season-premiere telecast among premium channels. By December 2021, an estimated 8.2 million viewers had watched the episode through linear and streaming platforms.

=== Critical reviews ===
"Cold Snap" received mixed to positive reviews from critics. Matt Fowler of IGN gave the episode a "great" 8 out of 10 and wrote in his verdict, "Dexter returns, reborn with a few tweaks and fidgets to the formula, but not so as to mask the malicious fun of the hallmarks from the old show that return anew under original showrunner Clyde Phillips. Michael C. Hall slips effortlessly back into his old sociopath role as time away, and change of scenery, has done wonders to revitalize this once-omnipresent pop-culture icon. 'Cold Snap' is a great and grisly opener for New Blood, setting the stage and delivering a Dexter Morgan doing his damndest to remain chaste on the murder front. Whether or not, contextually, this is all just a shot at a do-over feels irrelevant because New Blood's mix of old and new holds a ton of promise."

Richard Lawson of Vanity Fair wrote, "Dexter: New Blood is a surprisingly welcome return to the franchise's brand of heady nonsense, self-conscious but not overly precious about its meta awareness." Kelly McClure of Vulture gave the episode a 3 star out of 5 rating and wrote, "Hunting is assuredly a terrible thing, but if it takes something as relatively minor as that to break Jim's edge, then it seems like his dark passenger has an even stronger grip on him now than before. To take it back to edging, that's the conflict with pleasure delaying. Depriving yourself of something you really REALLY want makes it all the better when you finally let yourself gorge. And then you just want more." Nick Harley of Den of Geek gave the episode a 3 star out of 5 rating and wrote, "Overall, 'Cold Snap' doesn't introduce any new wrinkles or compelling ideas that show this return is warranted. I'm open to subsequent episodes proving me wrong, but so far this reeks of Showtime thumbing through its old IP for relevancy. Dexter is back, but only time will tell whether that's a good thing." Lorraine Ali of Los Angeles Times wrote, "Tension and logistical nightmares create high drama as the story branches into several mysteries and crises: missing and slain Indigenous women, another potential apex predator and a new generation of killers in the making."

Other reviews were more negative. Joshua Alston of The A.V. Club gave the episode a "C−" grade and wrote, "The vicariously violent version of this show simply won't hunt, not in 2021, with so many antihero stories that confront rather than conveniently dodge the moral quandaries such a character creates. Hopefully, the unpleasantness with Matthew will prove an unsavory means to an elegant end. This is, after all, definitely Dexter's last shot at one." Alan Sepinwall of Rolling Stone wrote, "New Blood seems simultaneously designed to appeal to all of those constituencies and none of them. It is competently told but a bit dull. And like its title character at this stage of his life, it seems too conflicted about all this blood and gore to enjoy any of it." Benji Wilson of The Daily Telegraph gave the episode a 3 star out of 5 rating and wrote, "Assessing its merits is a nettlesome task; there's the matter of whether it's a decent TV show, but then there's also the matter of whether it should have been resurrected at all."
