= Too Many Tuna Sandwiches =

- Dexter: New Blood episode
- Dexter Morgan (Michael C. Hall) reveals Angela Bishop (Julia Jones) his suicide attempt and his subsequent new life under Jim Lindsay.
- Episode no.: Episode 6
- Directed by: Marcos Siega
- Written by: Scott Reynolds & Warren Hsu Leonard
- Cinematography by: Hillary Fyfe
- Editing by: David Leonard
- Original air date: December 12, 2021
- Running time: 58 minutes

Guest appearances
- Jamie Chung as Molly Park; David Magidoff as Teddy; Gizel Jiménez as Tess; Katy Sullivan as Esther; Alton Fitzgerald White as Morris Cooper

Episode chronology
← Previous "Runaway"	Next → "Skin of Her Teeth"

"Too Many Tuna Sandwiches" is the sixth episode of the American television miniseries Dexter: New Blood, a continuation of the series Dexter. The episode was written by executive producer Scott Reynolds and consulting producer Warren Hsu Leonard and directed by executive producer Marcos Siega. It originally aired on Showtime on December 12, 2021, being also available on its streaming service at midnight on the same day.

The series follows Dexter Morgan after having faking his death on the original series finale. Dexter now lives in the fictional small town of Iron Lake, New York, hiding his identity under the name of Jim Lindsay, a local shopkeeper and having suppressed his killing urges. He is now in a relationship with Angela Bishop, the town's chief of police, and is beloved and respected in the town. A local troublemaker and the arrival of a mysterious person cause friction in his new life, as the past comes back to haunt him. In the episode, Dexter tries to investigate Kurt's connection with his son, as he appears to influence him to do things. He also has to deal with Angela, who has discovered his previous life as Dexter Morgan.

According to Nielsen Media Research, the episode was seen by an estimated 0.695 million household viewers and gained a 0.15 ratings share among adults aged 18–49. The episode received positive reviews from critics. Critics praised the therapy scenes between Dexter and Harrison, Angela's role and character development while criticism was aimed at Harrison's storyline and pace.

== Plot ==
Harrison (Jack Alcott) starts doing chores around the cabin after having his talk with Kurt (Clancy Brown). He also asks Dexter (Michael C. Hall) to sign a job application for Kurt's diner. Dexter refuses, concerned about Kurt's connection with his son, angering Harrison. Harrison then tells him he didn't go to therapy but actually met with Kurt.

While driving, Dexter is pulled over by Angela (Julia Jones), who shows him his obituary as Dexter Morgan. She forces him to drive to the station to explain everything. Dexter claims that Rita's and Debra's (Jennifer Carpenter) deaths impacted him, and he couldn't live with that life in Miami, prompting him to attempt to kill himself by driving towards a hurricane. He claims surviving was a sign to start again, abandoning his old life and starting a new one. Angela calls him out on abandoning Harrison and failing to amend everything; she is also angry for finding that their relationship was built on a lie and breaks up with him. After Dexter leaves, Molly (Jamie Chung) enters her office, intending to question Kurt about his lies to find the truth. Angela warns her to stay away from him.

Dexter starts investigating who could've been the source of his past life. He finds Molly's podcast and listens to a session where she claims that the Bay Harbor Butcher (Dexter) wasn't James Doakes as some crimes were committed while he was on military service, deducing the killer remains at large. Dexter and Harrison attend therapy, where Harrison expresses frustration at his abandonment. Dexter is less cooperative in the therapy, giving vague hints about his life and even claiming his marriage to Rita "fell apart." The last part prompts Harrison to reveal that he knows his mother was killed and tells the therapist he feels abandoned at their very own session.

Seeking to know more about Angela's next move, Dexter meets with Logan (Alano Miller), claiming he wants advice on how to save his relationship. Logan admits he dated Molly but has since broken up. He also states that Angela and Molly are working on something. This worries Dexter, who thinks they will go after him, unaware that they are actually investigating Kurt. At the same time, Harrison visits Audrey (Johnny Sequoyah) at her house. They both express frustration at their lives, which culminates in a kiss and having sex. The next morning, Angela finds them together in bed and angrily takes Harrison to Dexter.

Wanting to find out more about their investigation, Dexter plants his phone as a bug at the bar and records a meeting between Kurt and Molly. Kurt states he lied to the police to protect Matt from authorities and is willing to take her to interview him. Dexter follows them to the bunker preventing Kurt from getting Molly inside. He enters, finds that the door can't be opened from within, and finds the camera in the room. Dexter drives Molly back to town, angering Kurt as he foils his plan.

Angela and Teddy (David Magidoff) inspect a cave with a possible lead. They find an artificial hole, and Angela enters. She finds many rocks and, after moving them, finds a corpse. The corpse is that of Iris, her childhood friend who went missing. Dexter attends Harrison's wrestling match, noting Kurt is in attendance as a coach's aide. Harrison beats his opponent, but he breaks the opponent's arm even after winning. A stunned Dexter then gets into the arena to confront Kurt about motivating Harrison's actions. He attempts to talk with Harrison, wondering if Kurt told him to hurt the opponent. Dexter then receives a call from Angela, who got out of the cave. She says she doesn't need Jim; she needs Dexter Morgan.

== Development ==
=== Production ===
In November 2021, it was announced that the sixth episode of the revived series would be titled "Too Many Tuna Sandwiches", and was directed by executive producer Marcos Siega and written by executive producer Scott Reynolds and consulting producer Warren Hsu Leonard. The episode marked Reynolds' first writing credit for the series since the season 8 episode, "Goodbye Miami", and was his 12th writing credit for the series.

== Reception ==
=== Viewers ===
In its original American broadcast, "Too Many Tuna Sandwiches" was seen by an estimated 0.695 million household viewers and gained a 0.15 ratings share among adults aged 18–49, according to Nielsen Media Research. This means that 0.15 percent of all households with televisions watched the episode. This was a 26% increase in viewership from the previous episode, which was watched by 0.549 million viewers with a 0.11 in the 18-49 demographics.

=== Critical reviews ===
"Too Many Tuna Sandwiches" received positive reviews from critics. Matt Fowler of IGN gave the episode a "good" 7 out of 10 and wrote in his verdict, "Dexter: New Blood keeps delaying the important Dexter/Harrison truth bomb, for reasons that are still unclear, but fortunately 'Too Many Tuna Sandwiches' had other things going for it, regarding Kurt and his years of killing, to craft a capable and clever episode. A ton of secrets are spilling all over the place -- from Dexter's old life to Kurt's penchant for remote cabin murders -- and hopefully that means an even bigger reveal is on the way."

Joshua Alston of The A.V. Club gave the episode a "C+" grade and wrote, "The uneasy triangulation between Harrison and his two dads is the most interesting thing happening in New Blood, which continues to venture off into wan subplots that have yet to pay off. Harrison is becoming more violent and unpredictable by the episode, and Dexter's hands-off approach to psychopath parenting isn't quite doing the trick."

Kelly McClure of Vulture gave the episode a 3 star out of 5 rating and wrote, "If you were to attempt to pick a general theme for last week's episode, it would probably land somewhere within the vicinity of 'the simplest solution is often the solution.' This week's is more along the lines of 'nature vs. nurture.' If you're not familiar, the basic concept of nature vs. nurture is whether or not a person's behavior is molded by the events of their life and the actions of those around them, or more so from genetics and inherited traits. In episode six, 'Too Many Tuna Sandwiches,' this comes up in a family therapy session with Dexter/Jim and Harrison. When watching how they go about their unique blend of Morgan problem solving throughout the course of a day, it's genuinely hard to determine which of the two, nature vs. nurture, has the biggest responsibility for them both being huge psychos." Nick Harley of Den of Geek gave the episode a 3.5 star out of 5 rating and wrote, "Typically, when prestige dramas focus on their teenage characters, things go awry, but there are so many interesting wrinkles to Dexter facing the same conundrums that Harry had to face raising him. Prior to New Blood airing, I wondered if the series would be able to justify its existence beyond just being IP extension for ratings sake. On that therapy couch and in the hallway after Harrison's wrestling match, New Blood justified itself to me." Mary Littlejohn of TV Fanatic gave the episode a perfect 5 star out of 5 rating and wrote, "The beauty of this episode was that no time felt wasted, but there was plenty of room for every character to shine with some fun, heartfelt, and terrifying scenes. It's amazing what can fit in an hour."
