= Skin of Her Teeth =

- Dexter: New Blood episode
- Episode no.: Episode 7
- Directed by: Sanford Bookstaver
- Story by: Veronica West & Kirsa Rein & Alexandra Salerno
- Teleplay by: Veronica West & Kirsa Rein
- Cinematography by: Michael Watson
- Editing by: Perri Frank
- Original air date: December 19, 2021
- Running time: 46 minutes

Guest appearances
- John Lithgow as Arthur Mitchell (special guest star); Jamie Chung as Molly Park; Shuler Hensley as Elric Kane; Gregory Cruz as Abraham Brown; David Magidoff as Teddy; Michael Cyril Creighton as Fred, Jr.; Katy Sullivan as Esther; Pamela Matthews as Miriam; Alton Fitzgerald White as Morris Cooper

Episode chronology
← Previous "Too Many Tuna Sandwiches"	Next → "Unfair Game"

"Skin of Her Teeth" is the seventh episode of the American television miniseries Dexter: New Blood, a continuation of the series Dexter. The episode was written by co-executive producer Veronica West and executive story editor Kirsa Rein from a story by West, Rein and Alexandra Salerno and directed by Sanford Bookstaver. It originally aired on Showtime on December 19, 2021, being also available on its streaming service at midnight on the same day.

The series follows Dexter Morgan after having faking his death on the original series finale. Dexter now lives in the fictional small town of Iron Lake, New York, hiding his identity under the name of Jim Lindsay, a local shopkeeper and having suppressed his killing urges. He is now in a relationship with Angela Bishop, the town's chief of police, and is beloved and respected in the town. A local troublemaker and the arrival of a mysterious person cause friction in his new life, as the past comes back to haunt him. In the episode, Dexter helps Angela in inspecting Iris' corpse, hoping it would lead to Kurt's arrest. However, Kurt is a few steps ahead of them and attempts to avoid capture. Meanwhile, Harrison reveals an important secret to Dexter. The episode featured John Lithgow reprising his role as Arthur Mitchell in a cameo appearance.

According to Nielsen Media Research, the episode was seen by an estimated 0.713 million household viewers and gained a 0.15 ratings share among adults aged 18–49. The episode received positive reviews from critics. Critics praised the performances (particularly Hall and Brown), writing, tension and building momentum. John Lithgow's cameo appearance was also praised. Other critics commented on the episode's pace, with many deeming that it failed to move the story forward.

== Plot ==
In the cave, Angela (Julia Jones) tells Dexter (Michael C. Hall) to inspect Iris' corpse, due to his knowledge as a forensic scientist in his previous life in Miami. Dexter deduces that Iris was shot in the back somewhere else and then was buried alive. He removes one of Iris' teeth, finding that she bit her attacker. He hands over the tooth to Angela in order to find a possible DNA match. Angela tells Dexter that she suspects Kurt (Clancy Brown) because he wanted to stop the search for Matt to prevent the police finding Iris' body in the cave.

Dexter's relationship with Harrison (Jack Alcott) continues deteriorating, as Harrison is looking to be more involved with Kurt. Debra (Jennifer Carpenter) suggests that Dexter just kill Kurt, but Dexter intends to let Angela build a case against him, so Harrison will finally see Kurt for who he is. He decides to help Angela by informing her of his encounter with Kurt and Molly (Jamie Chung) at the cabin and they drive there to inspect. However, Kurt has already removed all of the room's furniture, although Angela still has faith she will catch up with him. Nevertheless, Dexter considers that he will have to kill him if the police fails to find anything.

Dexter visits Kurt's diner, where he has a talk with him about their previous encounters. Suddenly, Angela and Logan (Alano Miller) arrive and arrest Kurt for Iris' murder, taking him to the station. Angela questions him, showing that they inspected his phone records and he never talked with Matt in the days after his reported disappearance. She also reveals they compared Iris' attacker's DNA with Kurt's, which proved to be a match. Meanwhile, Harrison helps one of Kurt's truckers with cargo. The trucker then gives Harrison a small envelope, telling him to hand it to Dexter. He gives it to him, which contains a titanium screw.

That night, Dexter makes a distraction so that all officers leave the station and confronts Kurt to tell him to stay away from him and Harrison. Kurt teases Dexter by saying that it wasn't snowing when Dexter picked him up from the tavern, it was ashes and tells him "titanium doesn't melt". After leaving, Dexter remembers that Matt had a titanium screw in his leg, concluding that he knows he killed Matt. The next day, Kurt decides to make a police statement, explaining that his abusive father used to brutally attack girls. He states that his father picked up Iris and that's the only thing he knows. But flashbacks reveal that it was a young Kurt who picked her up in his truck and that Iris was running away. Kurt decided to not bring her to his father and tried to go back but Iris resisted, biting his hand and exiting the truck. This prompted Kurt to shoot her in the back, killing her.

Due to the testimony and only a 67% DNA match, the charges against Kurt are dropped and he is released. Angela then talks with Molly at the bar, explaining that while she found closure with Iris, she doesn't feel better. Their conversation soon turns to Dexter, realizing that he couldn't have heard Molly's earlier meeting with Kurt and likely recorded it with his phone. After inspecting Kurt's office and overhearing a conversation confirming his release, Dexter concludes he must kill him. He stops Harrison from hurting some high schoolers with a straight razor and has a talk with him. Harrison states that he had nightmares but now realizes they were actually memories: he remembers the day Arthur Mitchell killed his mother. He recalls Arthur (John Lithgow) comforting him after killing Rita, telling him "daddy will be home soon". Thinking that Dexter left because he thought he would grow up with these tendencies, Harrison hitches a ride to an unknown destination. Dexter decides to follow, intending to tell him everything. However, he is suddenly attacked from behind by the trucker who gave Harrison the envelope.

== Development ==
=== Production ===
In December 2021, it was announced that the seventh episode of the revived series would be titled "Skin of Her Teeth", and was directed by Sanford Bookstaver and written by co-executive producer Veronica West and executive story editor Kirsa Rein from a story by West, Rein and Alexandra Salerno.

=== Casting ===
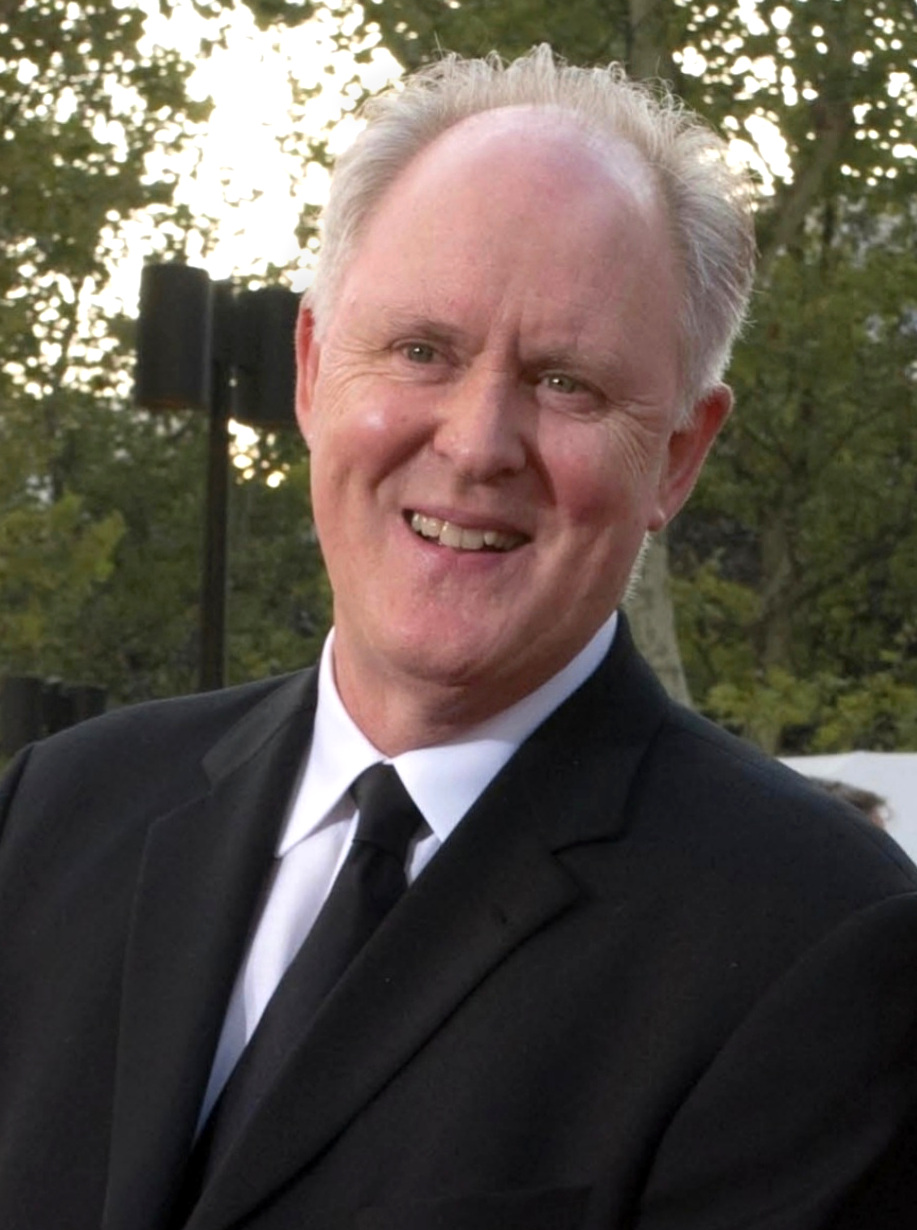
John Lithgow returns as Arthur Mitchell in the episode, having played him in the series' fourth season.

In June 2021, it was reported that John Lithgow would reprise his role as Arthur Mitchell in a cameo appearance. He reportedly filmed his scenes in a single day. Clyde Phillips kept in touch with Lithgow after his appearance on the fourth season, and arranged a return for the actor. Due to scheduling commitments, Lithgow was only available for a limited time. Phillips intended for his appearance to be kept a secret, but reports were circulating when Lithgow revealed his appearance during an interview.

== Reception ==
=== Viewers ===
In its original American broadcast, "Skin of Her Teeth" was seen by an estimated 0.713 million household viewers and gained a 0.15 ratings share among adults aged 18–49, according to Nielsen Media Research. This means that 0.15 percent of all households with televisions watched the episode. This was a 2% increase in viewership from the previous episode, which was watched by 0.695 million viewers with a 0.15 in the 18-49 demographics.

According to Showtime, the episode was watched by 2.34 million total viewers across all platforms.

=== Critical reviews ===
"Skin of Her Teeth" received positive reviews from critics. Matt Fowler of IGN gave the episode an "okay" 6 out of 10 and wrote in his verdict, "As a second (seasonal) act Dexter episode, 'Skin of Her Teeth' was sort of par for the course. Not bad, but also not quite offering up anything satisfying. Dexter and Angela know Kurt's a killer but that branch isn't bearing fruit just yet. Next week could be killer, since this week planted some decent seeds, but on the whole 'Skin of Her Teeth' was medium-well set up."

Joshua Alston of The A.V. Club gave the episode an "A" grade and wrote, "Between Angela and Molly's road trip to Manhattan and Dexter's foray into narcotics enforcement, New Blood's last two episodes were clearly designed to keep the show's gunpowder dry before a third-act crescendo. But who could have predicted the next installment would be as explosive as 'Skin Of Her Teeth?' Even more than the strong 'H Is For Hero', the seventh episode makes a strong case for New Blood's existence and instills confidence that this season might provide the ending Dexter deserves."

Kelly McClure of Vulture gave the episode a 3 star out of 5 rating and wrote, "If, on average, each episode of a TV show is only truly interesting for roughly 15 minutes out of the allotted 45, then what does that say about the show as a whole? In the case of New Blood, and definitely in the case of this most recent episode, it's starting to feel like we've spent a lot of the runtime waiting for something good to happen. And while it's undeniable at this point that the good stuff is few and far between, when it does roll around, the wow factor of it makes the episode feel worth it." Nick Harley of Den of Geek gave the episode a 3.5 star out of 5 rating and wrote, "'Skin of Her Teeth' has that classic 'Two Steps Forward, One Step Back' Dexter feeling, but still manages to give great showcases to Alcott and Julia Jones, who is finally able to get closure about the Iris situation. It was also fun to see some new Trinity Killer footage, but I imagine John Lithgow signed on for more than just a quick topless scene. There are worse ways for this show to burn runtime." Mary Littlejohn of TV Fanatic gave the episode a 4.5 star out of 5 rating and wrote, "A grim and troubling turn of events led to a killer walking free. On 'Skin of Her Teeth', Kurt Caldwell slithered out of prison and began toying with Dexter. It was a tense hour of power shifts and crushing reveals."
