= Runaway (Dexter: New Blood) =

- Dexter: New Blood episode
- Episode no.: Episode 5
- Directed by: Marcos Siega
- Written by: Veronica West
- Cinematography by: Hillary Fyfe
- Editing by: David Leonard
- Original air date: December 5, 2021
- Running time: 57 minutes

Guest appearances
- David Zayas as Angel Batista (special guest star); Jamie Chung as Molly Park; Shuler Hensley as Elric; David Magidoff as Teddy; Gizel Jiménez as Tess; Katy Sullivan as Esther; Pamela Matthews as Miriam; Skyler Wright as Chloe; Oscar Wahlberg as Zach

Episode chronology
← Previous "H Is for Hero"	Next → "Too Many Tuna Sandwiches"

"Runaway" is the fifth episode of the American television miniseries Dexter: New Blood, a continuation of the series Dexter. The episode was written by co-executive producer Veronica West and directed by executive producer Marcos Siega. It originally aired on Showtime on December 5, 2021, being also available on its streaming service at midnight on the same day.

The series follows Dexter Morgan after having faking his death on the original series finale. Dexter now lives in the fictional small town of Iron Lake, New York, hiding his identity under the name of Jim Lindsay, a local shopkeeper and having suppressed his killing urges. He is now in a relationship with Angela Bishop, the town's chief of police, and is beloved and respected in the town. A local troublemaker and the arrival of a mysterious person cause friction in his new life, as the past comes back to haunt him. In the episode, Dexter must face a new dilemma with Harrison's newly discovered personality, while Harrison himself starts to act rebellious, with some consequences. Meanwhile, Angela and Molly travel to New York City for a conference as well as to investigate Matt Caldwell's possible sighting. The episode featured the return of David Zayas as Angel Batista, who played the character in the original series' run.

According to Nielsen Media Research, the episode was seen by an estimated 0.549 million household viewers and gained a 0.11 ratings share among adults aged 18–49. The episode received mixed-to-positive reviews from critics. Critics praised Angela's storyline, its ending and some welcomed Angel Batista's return in the episode, but criticized the writing, particularly Dexter's and Harrison's storylines.

== Plot ==
Dexter (Michael C. Hall) is still stunned at finding the straight razor, telling Debra (Jennifer Carpenter) that he needs to help Harrison (Jack Alcott) in this difficult time. Meanwhile, Kurt (Clancy Brown) leads Chloe (Skyler Wright) to the bunker, telling her she can stay for as long as she wants.

When Dexter questions Harrison about the razor, he claims he uses it for defense. Angry at his father's lack of trust in him, Harrison storms off. Outside, Zach (Oscar Wahlberg) and his friends invite Harrison to a party, which he accepts. The partygoers were all part of Ethan's "kill list," and Harrison is the guest of honor. Harrison consumes ecstasy and oxycodone laced with fentanyl and makes a minor slice on a girl's foot. He then shares with Audrey (Johnny Sequoyah) about his father, saying that he is lying about his name before passing out. Audrey is forced to call authorities, and Sergeant Logan (Alano Miller) helps him regain consciousness, and he is taken to the hospital. Logan informs Dexter about the incident and that the drugs were sourced from a dealer named Miles (Dakota Lustick). After Harrison is released, Dexter tells him he will go to therapy and limit his time out of the house.

Angela (Julia Jones) is informed that Matt has been staying at a luxury hotel in New York City after tracking his credit cards. She decides to go to New York to talk to him and attend a Missing Persons conference. She also allows Molly (Jamie Chung) to accompany her, as she needs material for her podcast. At the New York hotel, they were informed that Matt had checked out the day before their arrival. As they await security footage, they attend the conference, headlined by Angel Batista (David Zayas), now Captain of Homicide of the Miami Metro Police Department. She talks with Angel after the conference, where he briefly talks about the Bay Harbor Butcher and Trinity Killer, mentioning Debra's name but stating she died, along with her brother, Dexter, although he does not say his name. He also mentions that her brother had a son named Harrison.

Dexter retrieves medicines and equipment from a local veterinarian, planning to kill Miles. He arrives at the bar he frequents, acting as an interested customer. Outside, Dexter injects Miles, but before he can fully inject him with ketamine, Logan arrives. Dexter then starts brutally attacking Miles until Logan restrains him. Miles is arrested, but Dexter is also brought to the station for paperwork. Dexter witnesses Logan intimidate Miles with threats to charge him with homicide, and he confesses that he works for a man named Jasper Hodge (Kellan Rhude), who makes the pills. Dexter overhears the conversation and infiltrates Jasper's house to sedate him before the police arrive in a few days with a warrant.

At the bunker, Chloe immediately sees the camera turning on and realizes her state. However, she provokes Kurt by undressing herself in front of the camera and refusing to go outside when he orders her. This forces Kurt to go into her room, where she uses a shard of glass to slice his face through his ski mask. He takes her outside, telling her to run, but she refuses. When she approaches him, he kills her by shooting her in the eye, upsetting him.

Meanwhile, Dexter prepares to kill Jasper in his home, having arranged his table, when he notices that Logan is outside. Dexter then removes all of his equipment and forces Jasper to snort pure fentanyl powder, which he had been using to manufacture adulterated fake Roxicodone, or "Blues." When authorities enter the house, Dexter and his equipment are gone, and Jasper is found dead from an overdose in his chair.

Kurt picks up Harrison, who plans on leaving town, and takes him to the diner. After some talk, he gives him a job at the diner. Harrison returns to the cabin and lies to Dexter about attending therapy. Angela and Molly are shown security footage of Matt checking out of the hotel, confirming that the person is not Matt and that Kurt lied to them. When she returns home, she talks with Audrey, who recalls Harrison's statement that his father wasn't Jim Lindsay. Based on her talk with Angel, it prompts Angela to investigate. She finds something that shocks her. Angela then prints out its content, which is revealed to be an obituary for Dexter.

== Production ==
=== Development ===
In November 2021, it was announced that the fifth episode of the revived series would be titled "Runaway", and was directed by executive producer Marcos Siega and written by co-executive producer Veronica West.

=== Casting ===
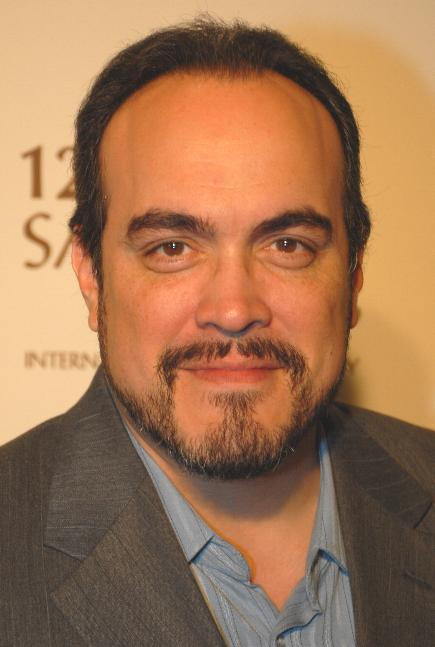
David Zayas returns as Angel Batista in the episode, having played him in the series' original run.

The episode featured the return of David Zayas as Angel Batista, who played the character as part of the main cast for Dexter's whole run. Prior to the series' premiere, showrunner Clyde Phillips explained that there would be some familiar faces returning to the series. Hall also teased in September 2021 that a surprise guest from the series would return. When Phillips contacted Zayas to appear in a small part, he immediately accepted. He further added, "There were a lot of emotions that went into it, but overall I was extremely happy that I was asked to be a part of this reboot, even if it's in a small capacity."

== Reception ==
=== Viewers ===
In its original American broadcast, "Runaway" was seen by an estimated 0.549 million household viewers and gained a 0.11 ratings share among adults aged 18–49, according to Nielsen Media Research. This means that 0.11 percent of all households with televisions watched the episode. This was a 19% increase in viewership from the previous episode, which was watched by 0.460 million viewers with a 0.06 in the 18-49 demographics.

=== Critical reviews ===
"Runaway" received mixed-to-positive reviews from critics. Matt Fowler of IGN gave the episode an "okay" 6 out of 10 and wrote in his verdict, "Because Harrison wasn't ready to bond over violent tendencies, this week everything sort of went into hover mode. Dexter all of a sudden decided that his relapse wasn't a one time slip and shifted back into his Butcher skin, and that turn felt a bit wasteful. Also, the reveal of the Sniper Killer identity felt flat too since it had been so clumsily foreshadowed. But there were some good moments this week, and promising seeds planted, that all seem to spell doom for good ol' Dex. And even though no one really wants Dexter back in Miami, Miami came to Dexter and it was a delight to briefly see Batista."

Joshua Alston of The A.V. Club gave the episode a "C−" grade and wrote, "The end result is that Angela is now armed with the knowledge that Jim Lindsay isn't who he claims to be, which is confirmed for her after Audrey mentions Harrison's intoxicated confession. And that's a fine place for New Blood to be in as it enters its back half. But man alive, getting to that point requires accepting a Jenga tower of goofy contrivances that harkens back to Dexter's very worst storytelling impulses. 'Runaway' suggests there may not be any new blood running through this franchise after all."

Kelly McClure of Vulture gave the episode a 4 star out of 5 rating and wrote, "We are now officially halfway through Dexter: New Blood, and Dexter Morgan/Jim Lindsay's small-town hideout of Iron Lake, New York, is about to get dangerously smaller." Nick Harley of Den of Geek gave the episode a 4 star out of 5 rating and wrote, "It will be interesting to see how revelation plays out, and whether the show can come up with a plausible way for Dexter to wiggle out of this one. Still, 'Runaway' is a stuffed hour of television that moves the story forward in a big way. I'm excited to see if Dexter: New Blood can keep the momentum up." Mary Littlejohn of TV Fanatic gave the episode a 4 star out of 5 rating and wrote, "So much happened on this episode! Now that Angela and Audrey are on to 'Jim', the fun will come in how they, along with Molly, unearth the information about this mysterious man and his troubled son."
