= Smoke Signals (Dexter: New Blood) =

- Dexter: New Blood episode
- Episode no.: Episode 3
- Directed by: Sanford Bookstaver
- Written by: David McMillan
- Cinematography by: Michael Watson
- Editing by: Katie Ennis
- Original air date: November 21, 2021
- Running time: 51 minutes

Guest appearances
- Jamie Chung as Molly Park; Fredric Lehne as Edward Olsen; Gregory Cruz as Abraham Brown; Christian Dell'Edera as Ethan; David Magidoff as Teddy; Pamela Matthews as Miriam; Michael Cyril Creighton as Fred Jr.; Katy Sullivan as Esther; Gizel Jiménez as Tess

Episode chronology
← Previous "Storm of Fuck"	Next → "H Is for Hero"

"Smoke Signals" is the third episode of the American television miniseries Dexter: New Blood, a continuation of the series Dexter. The episode was written by co-producer David McMillan and directed by Sanford Bookstaver. It originally aired on Showtime on November 21, 2021, being also available on its streaming service at midnight on the same day.

The series follows Dexter Morgan after having faking his death on the original series finale. Dexter now lives in the fictional small town of Iron Lake, New York, hiding his identity under the name of Jim Lindsay, a local shopkeeper and having suppressed his killing urges. He is now in a relationship with Angela Bishop, the town's chief of police, and is beloved and respected in the town. A local troublemaker and the arrival of a mysterious person cause friction in his new life, as the past comes back to haunt him. In the episode, Matt's disappearance and investigation continues as authorities get closer to finding out his whereabouts, forcing Dexter to fix his mistakes by moving the body. Meanwhile, Harrison enrolls into high school and helps a student fight his bullies.

According to Nielsen Media Research, the episode was seen by an estimated 0.325 million household viewers and gained a 0.09 ratings share among adults aged 18–49. The episode received positive reviews from critics. Critics praised the acting (particularly Hall and Alcott), tension, character development and the less focus on "Jim Lindsay", with many deeming it an improvement over the previous episodes.

== Plot ==
Dexter (Michael C. Hall) enrolls Harrison (Jack Alcott) in school, and the principal persuades Dexter to connect more with his son. Dexter is later called to the police station, where Angela (Julia Jones) explains that wildlife cameras in the woods identified Matt and an unrecognizable figure through thermal imaging. When Dexter identifies the rifle as the one he sold to Matt, Angela orders a further investigation of the crime scene, shocking Kurt (Clancy Brown).

An Albany crime scene investigator arrives at the scene to help with the investigation. To Dexter's disappointment, he correctly deduces that someone attacked Matt after he shot the deer. Angela calls in for search dogs to help the next day and has Kurt cooperate with a sample of his DNA to confirm Matt's involvement. During the night, Dexter exhumes the bags containing Matt's pieces to relocate them and uses Matt's vest to mislead the dogs by passing it through the crime scene. Meanwhile, Lily is suddenly allowed to exit her room and escape into the wilderness, discovering she was being held in a bunker. A man wearing a white ski mask then shoots her from a distance, killing her. Dexter hears the gunshot but dismisses it as hunters.

Harrison scores an excellent placement exam but is suspected of having cheated, so he is forced to do it again, managing to improve his score. He applies for the wrestling team and discovers that Zach and some other students are bullying a fellow student, Ethan (Christian Dell'Edera), by having him be in a texting relationship with a girl that doesn't exist. Harrison tells Ethan about the facade and helps him get revenge by sending a photoshopped version of Zach. Zach prepares to attack Ethan when Harrison intervenes, choking and threatening him. While in the car with Audrey (Johnny Sequoyah), the car breaks down. While Harrison goes to ask for help, Olsen (Fredric Lehne) approaches Audrey once again, and she rebuffs him.

True crime podcaster Molly Park (Jamie Chung) arrives at the scene, intending to find any useful information. Faced with pressure from Debra (Jennifer Carpenter), Dexter decides to put Matt's pieces in a cave but is forced to leave when a bear emerges from the cave, scrapping his plans. At night, he dines with Angela, Audrey, and Harrison at her house. Audrey expresses frustration at Angela for putting the deer's corpse in the butcher's shop. Angela allows her to give the deer back to the Seneca people, who burn the deer in a bonfire. After that, Dexter apologizes to Harrison for not supporting him and promises to do better. Harrison replies with, "Thanks, Dad", which pleases Dexter.

Inspired by the bonfire, Dexter takes Matt's body pieces and throws them in a factory incinerator, giving him relief. While driving through town, he wonders in his mind about his murder methods and problems when he sees a drunk Kurt outside the tavern. Kurt claims to have seen and talked to his son via FaceTime. Dexter decides to take him home but questions Kurt's state of mind.

== Production ==
=== Development ===
In November 2021, it was announced that the third episode of the revived series would be titled "Smoke Signals", and was directed by Sanford Bookstaver and written by co-producer David McMillan.

== Reception ==
=== Viewers ===
In its original American broadcast, "Smoke Signals" was seen by an estimated 0.325 million household viewers and gained a 0.09 ratings share among adults aged 18–49, according to Nielsen Media Research. This means that 0.09 percent of all households with televisions watched the episode. This was a 42% decrease in viewership from the previous episode, which was watched by 0.560 million viewers with a 0.12 in the 18-49 demographics.

=== Critical reviews ===
"Smoke Signals" received positive reviews from critics. Matt Fowler of IGN gave the episode a "good" 7 out of 10 and wrote in his verdict, "Harrison continued to be a pill this week in 'Smoke Signals', but some solid hints were dropped that he might be the host to a Dark Passenger himself - which would open up several new interesting paths for New Blood to take. Dexter's continuing efforts to erase his brutal botch from the premiere had already overstayed their welcome prior to this week, so his Matt Caldwell problems didn't make for the new content one may have hoped for, but it was still interesting to watch the show's killer themes shift over to Harrison. As Dexter was devout in covering this up and getting back to his old routine, Harrison's own past is peeking through as a fresh darkness to deal with."

Joshua Alston of The A.V. Club gave the episode a "B" grade and wrote, "With an original ending so reviled, New Blood is on a short leash with its audience as much as if it was a brand new series. There's little time to dilly-dally. So while it's completely understandable that Winter Dexter needed time to warm up, it's a shame that some people might not have made it through to 'Smoke Signals', this season's most promising episode yet. It's also the first episode to capture that sense of fun and mischief that saturated Dexter in its prime."

Kelly McClure of Vulture gave the episode a 4 star out of 5 rating and wrote, "Warming up after a debut consisting of two relatively tepid and whiny episodes, Dexter: New Blood is chipping the ice on the fun of the original series in episode three. Not to drive a nail in the coffin in terms of both murder puns and Dexter Morgan/Jim Lindsay bashing, but it's worth noting that the best episode out of this first batch of three is the one to feature its titular character the least. Just sayin'." Nick Harley of Den of Geek gave the episode a 3.5 star out of 5 rating and wrote, "While Dexter: New Blood can't shake all the show's bad habits, some of its new tricks are helping to offset them." Mary Littlejohn of TV Fanatic gave the episode a 4 star out of 5 rating and wrote, "One thing that Dexter: New Blood does well is giving space to the traditions and rituals of the Seneca people. The deer burning scene was beautiful. It felt right to give reverence to the 'character' that was arguably the catalyst for Matt's murder."
