= The Family Business (Dexter: New Blood) =

- Dexter: New Blood episode
- Episode no.: Episode 9
- Directed by: Sanford Bookstaver
- Written by: Scott Reynolds
- Cinematography by: Hillary Fyfe
- Editing by: Katie Ennis
- Original air date: January 2, 2022
- Running time: 57 minutes

Guest appearances
- Jamie Chung as Molly Park; Shuler Hensley as Elric Kane; David Magidoff as Teddy Reed; Michael Laurence as Wiggles the Clown

Episode chronology
← Previous "Unfair Game"	Next → "Sins of the Father"

"The Family Business" is the ninth episode of the American television miniseries Dexter: New Blood, a continuation of the series Dexter. The episode was written by executive producer Scott Reynolds and directed by Sanford Bookstaver. It originally aired on Showtime on January 2, 2022, being also available on its streaming service at midnight on the same day.

The series follows Dexter Morgan after having faking his death on the original series finale. Dexter now lives in the fictional small town of Iron Lake, New York, hiding his identity under the name of Jim Lindsay, a local shopkeeper and having suppressed his killing urges. He is now in a relationship with Angela Bishop, the town's chief of police, and is beloved and respected in the town. A local troublemaker and the arrival of a mysterious person cause friction in his new life, as the past comes back to haunt him. In the episode, Dexter introduces Harrison to "The Dark Passenger" and the Code of Harry, hoping this will help him. Both then decide to go after Kurt, who is tying loose ends before one final stand against them.

According to Nielsen Media Research, the episode was seen by an estimated 0.576 million household viewers and gained a 0.11 ratings share among adults aged 18–49. The episode received very positive reviews from critics. Critics praised the scenes between Dexter and Harrison, performances, character development and build-up to the finale.

== Plot ==
Dexter (Michael C. Hall) explains the meaning of "The Dark Passenger" to Harrison (Jack Alcott), explaining the purpose of the Code of Harry and how it helped him channel the Passenger. He then tells the story about a time in Miami where he followed Wiggles (Michael Laurence), a party clown who killed many children. However, at Debra's (Jennifer Carpenter) insistence, he hides the fact that he kills his victims, claiming he only confronts them and scares them to stop hurting people. This relieves Harrison, who connects more with his father. Shortly thereafter, Dexter chops up Elric's body into pieces.

On Christmas Day, Dexter gifts Harrison some clothing as well as a rifle. Harrison tests the rifle on bottles, managing to hit them. Dexter reveals that Kurt (Clancy Brown) was after Harrison because he confronted him, revealing Kurt's real persona as a serial killer. Harrison can't testify against Kurt because it would implicate Dexter at the scene. They then leave to meet with Angela (Julia Jones) and Audrey (Johnny Sequoyah). Unaware to Dexter, Angela has been investigating the Bay Harbor Butcher, finding a pattern between his victims and the drug dealer's death. Their reunion is interrupted when Kurt shows up with a gift for Angela and has a conversation with both Dexter and Harrison, who hide their encounter with him from Angela and Audrey. After he leaves, they decide to investigate his cabin to find any crucial evidence.

While investigating, Harrison confesses that he indeed injured Ethan at school and apologizes for his behavior. He also questions again about Wiggles' fate, deeming that just scaring him wouldn't be "justice". He also states that he has dreamed about hunting Trinity Killer and killing him with his own razor. Although tempted to reveal his true nature, Dexter is persuaded by Debra not to say anything. Having found the place where Kurt may hide his victims' remains, they decide to investigate later that night to avoid suspicion. While they are gone, Kurt sets fire to their cabin, intending to shoot them when they leave, but is shocked to see they are not in the cabin.

At Kurt's cabin, they find a bunker outside and they descend to access it. The security system alerts Kurt of their presence, panicking him. Dexter and Harrison find to their horror a hallway where Kurt keeps his dead victims embalmed and displayed in crates, including Lily and Molly (Jamie Chung). Harrison asks Dexter if he killed Wiggles and despite Deb imploring him not to do it, Dexter confirms it as well as admitting to killing Trinity and many other killers. Meanwhile, Angela investigates Molly's vacated hotel room and finds her recorder in the safe, deducing she would never leave it behind.

Knowing he will soon be caught, Kurt starts packing his belongings at his house, preparing to flee. He is then confronted by Harrison, distracting him so that Dexter can sedate him. They take him to his bunker, wrapping him in plastic on his embalming table. Kurt excuses his actions, explaining that he gave these women a salvation from his father although he was angry that they always wanted to leave. He also reveals that he tried to kill Harrison because Dexter killed Matt, although Dexter states that Matt fit the code for the boat accident. With Harrison as witness, Dexter kills Kurt and starts chopping up his body. As the blood reminds him of his mother's death, Harrison steps outside while Dexter finishes chopping up the body.

Dexter and Harrison discard the body bags at the foundry, noting that Kurt's behavior and trying to flee will serve as a good cover for them. They return to their cabin the next morning and are shocked to find it burned to the ground. Angela questions Dexter about his whereabouts, but Audrey allows them to stay with them for a time. At her house, Angela receives a note in an envelope, which states "Jim Lindsay killed Matt Caldwell" as well as leaving titanium screws. She then stares at Dexter, in suspicion.

== Production ==
=== Development ===
In December 2021, it was announced that the ninth episode of the revived series would be titled "The Family Business", and was directed by Sanford Bookstaver and written by executive producer Scott Reynolds.

== Reception ==
=== Viewers ===
In its original American broadcast, "The Family Business" was seen by an estimated 0.576 million household viewers and gained a 0.11 ratings share among adults aged 18–49, according to Nielsen Media Research. This means that 0.11 percent of all households with televisions watched the episode. This was a 2% increase in viewership from the previous episode, which was watched by 0.566 million viewers with a 0.11 in the 18-49 demographics.

=== Critical reviews ===
"The Family Business" received very positive reviews from critics. Matt Fowler of IGN gave the episode an "amazing" 9 out of 10 and wrote in his verdict, "'The Family Business' was tense, macabre, and wonderfully gratifying. The show once again cast a spell over us by having us root for Dexter, as a father, to successfully impart his serial killer code to his son when everything, even Dexter's inner Deb, indicates it's a doomed decision, just as it was when Harry made grievous mistakes with Dexter. This feels right by feeling so very wrong and totally nails a crucial culmination element for the entire saga."

Joshua Alston of The A.V. Club gave the episode a "B" grade and wrote, "As is often the case with Dexter, the episode gets most interesting when it's time for Dexter to put his prey on the table and give the last rites. These scenes are usually a duet between Dexter and the Big Bad, but Harrison's presence is a game-changer."

Kelly McClure of Vulture gave the episode a 3 star out of 5 rating and wrote, "The timing of New Blood has felt off in many ways, and that fact is wrapped up with a nice little bow on top with its second to last episode taking place on Christmas Day but airing on January 2. It's depressing to get a Christmas gift after the holiday itself has come and gone, and it feels sloppy for a show that's been doing this long enough to know better not to have the presence of mind or desire to tighten up the storyline so that the episodes fall on, or at least closer to, the real-time holiday they're playing out. Just one more in a series of missed opportunities in New Blood that we won't have to pretend not to notice for much longer." Nick Harley of Den of Geek gave the episode a 4.5 star out of 5 rating and wrote, "By focusing on Dexter trying to slowly reveal his true self to his son, New Blood tapped into some of Dexter's best qualities. The show also tries to juxtapose a juvenile reading of Dexter's actions — he's a badass vigilante! — with the reality of what he's doing, which is finding a way to justify his monstrous behavior. It's a fantastic penultimate installment and one of the series' very best episodes. The only misstep is having Molly Park's death take place off-screen. If New Blood manages to fumble on its finale, we'll at least have 'The Family Business' to remind us why we fell in love with Dexter in the first place." Mary Littlejohn of TV Fanatic gave the episode a 4 star out of 5 rating and wrote, "It's all feeling pretty grim right now, but I'm honestly ready for Dexter to get his comeuppance. Hell, an entire season of Dexter on trial for the Bay Harbor Butcher murders would have been riveting. Hall's Dexter is a gold mine of a character. He has an enduring fandom (of which I am obviously a part) that would love nothing more than to see him continue his adventures. But there is a point where we need a payoff."
