= Unfair Game =

- Dexter: New Blood episode
- Episode no.: Episode 8
- Directed by: Sanford Bookstaver
- Written by: Tony Saltzman & David McMillan
- Cinematography by: Michael Watson
- Editing by: Perri Frank
- Original air date: December 26, 2021
- Running time: 43 minutes

Guest appearance
- Shuler Hensley as Elric Kane

Episode chronology
← Previous "Skin of Her Teeth"	Next → "The Family Business"

"Unfair Game" is the eighth episode of the American television miniseries Dexter: New Blood, a continuation of the series Dexter. The episode was written by supervising producer Tony Saltzman and co-producer David McMillan and directed by Sanford Bookstaver. It originally aired on Showtime on December 26, 2021, being also available on its streaming service at midnight on the same day.

The series follows Dexter Morgan after having faking his death on the original series finale. Dexter now lives in the fictional small town of Iron Lake, New York, hiding his identity under the name of Jim Lindsay, a local shopkeeper and having suppressed his killing urges. He is now in a relationship with Angela Bishop, the town's chief of police, and is beloved and respected in the town. A local troublemaker and the arrival of a mysterious person cause friction in his new life, as the past comes back to haunt him. In the episode, Dexter hides in the woods as he is being hunted by one of Kurt's hitmen. Kurt, meanwhile, spends time with Harrison as he puts his plan in motion. Meanwhile, Angela starts investigating recent events and starts suspecting Dexter may have been involved.

According to Nielsen Media Research, the episode was seen by an estimated 0.566 million household viewers and gained a 0.11 ratings share among adults aged 18–49. The episode received very positive reviews from critics. Critics praised the tension, performances and finally addressing the inevitable conversation between Dexter and Harrison although others still expressed frustration at the pace and short runtime.

== Plot ==
Dexter (Michael C. Hall) has been kidnapped by Elric Kane (Shuler Hensley) and is being driven to meet with Kurt (Clancy Brown). Dexter uses his cuffs to attack Kane and cause the car to crash, causing Dexter to be ejected through the windshield. Kane then starts shooting at Dexter with a rifle, hitting him in the leg and prompting him to flee into the woods.

While talking with Angela (Julia Jones), Logan (Alano Miller) accidentally mentions that Dexter attacked a dealer outside a bar for supplying drugs to his son. She questions the dealer, Miles, who states that Dexter asked him for drugs, injected him with a needle and then punched him when the police arrived. She also learns from Logan that Miles' supplier, Jasper Hodge, was found dead in his apartment and due to the time coincidences, she starts suspecting Dexter. Meanwhile, Harrison (Jack Alcott) is picked up by Kurt and they visit the high school, where Kurt shows him Matt's trophies in multiple sports. He then teaches Harrison to hit a baseball, although he uses a machine to also hit him, causing Harrison to angrily remember all of his confrontations with his father.

Back in the woods, Dexter lays a false trail to mislead Kane while he escapes via a different route, leaving a confused Kane to look for him through the forest. Dexter finally makes his way to a closed summer camp, where he finds many instruments in the kitchen. As night falls, Kane finds the camp and is attacked by Dexter with a kitchen knife. Kane claims that he planned on taking him to Kurt's cabin and that it wasn't anything personal, but Dexter still kills him with a knife before leaving the scene in Kane's truck. Meanwhile, Angela investigates Jasper's death and finds another sign of a needle being injected in his neck, making her realize that Dexter was also involved there.

At the cabin, Harrison starts receiving text messages from Dexter to get out but decides to ignore it. He then dines with Kurt, with both bonding over their respective personalities. Harrison also reveals that he went looking for his father for a "connection" and expresses frustration about his father hiding secrets from him. Kurt leaves for a moment and returns with his rifle and ski mask, stating that it is time to pay for the "sins of the father". He instructs him to run as he targets him, just as Dexter arrives in the truck. Dexter fails to run Kurt over, but his appearance prompts him to flee. Dexter reunites with Harrison, and both leave the cabin.

At her house, Angela continues investigating Miles and Jasper, as both were injected with ketamine. She decides to search homicides in Miami related to ketamine, eventually finding more about the Bay Harbor Butcher. Back in the truck, Harrison asks about what happened, and Dexter decides that it is time to tell everything. He explains that Harrison is not alone in his dark thoughts and that he will teach him a "Code" to help him. Harrison then embraces Dexter, making Dexter think that this was not only what Harrison needed, but what he himself needed.

== Production ==
=== Development ===
In December 2021, it was announced that the eighth episode of the revived series would be titled "Unfair Game", and was directed by Sanford Bookstaver and written by supervising producer Tony Saltzman and co-producer David McMillan.

== Reception ==
=== Viewers ===
In its original American broadcast, "Unfair Game" was seen by an estimated 0.566 million household viewers and gained a 0.11 ratings share among adults aged 18–49, according to Nielsen Media Research. This means that 0.11 percent of all households with televisions watched the episode. This was a 21% decrease in viewership from the previous episode, which was watched by 0.713 million viewers with a 0.15 in the 18-49 demographics.

=== Critical reviews ===
"Unfair Game" received very positive reviews from critics. Matt Fowler of IGN gave the episode a "great" 8 out of 10 and wrote in his verdict, "'Unfair Game' was an exciting chapter that gave us Dexter on the defensive, physically, which is something we don't often get to see. Usually, it's a mental chess game full of hurried errands involving the hiding of evidence, but here it was full-on wilderness survival mode. It would have been better, perhaps, as a sniper rifle showdown with Kurt, but Kurt was busy unspooling his own devilish plot, which itself lent a great deal to the season overall, raising his villain profile (and multiple remote cabin owner profile) considerably."

Joshua Alston of The A.V. Club gave the episode a "B−" grade and wrote, "While not a complete disappointment, 'Unfair Game' is oddly paced and edited throughout, even as it finally brings the season's long-simmering plotlines to a head."

Kelly McClure of Vulture gave the episode a 4 star out of 5 rating and wrote, "If my theory about Dexter/Jim dying at the end of this is correct, will it be him, Angela, or Harrison who does it? Harrison would be the most dynamic option out of the three, but my money's on Batista. This is New Blood, though, and I'm bracing for the disappointment of none of this happening and for the last scene of the series being Dexter driving into the sunset, giving the camera a little wink. Barf at the thought of it." Nick Harley of Den of Geek gave the episode a 3 star out of 5 rating and wrote, "Anyway, 'Unfair Game' inches things forward, but only slightly. The main takeaway is that Harrison and Dexter have seemed to have mended their broken relationship, and if the war between Dexter and Kurt wasn't officially on, it certainly is now. With two episodes left, hopefully Dexter: New Blood quits stalling and really starts showing its endgame." Mary Littlejohn of TV Fanatic gave the episode a 4.5 star out of 5 rating and wrote, "In an already superb season, 'Unfair Game' has got to be one of the most streamlined episodes thus far. It was focused, well-paced, and unrelentingly suspenseful. There's no time to waste now. Secrets are out. Everything is coming to a head."
