= H Is for Hero =

- Dexter: New Blood episode
- Episode no.: Episode 4
- Directed by: Sanford Bookstaver
- Written by: Tony Saltzman
- Cinematography by: Michael Watson
- Editing by: Katie Ennis
- Original air date: November 28, 2021
- Running time: 45 minutes

Guest appearances
- Jamie Chung as Molly Park; David Magidoff as Teddy; Katy Sullivan as Esther; Michael Cyril Creighton as Fred Jr.; Christian Dell'Edera as Ethan

Episode chronology
← Previous "Smoke Signals"	Next → "Runaway"

"H Is for Hero" is the fourth episode of the American television miniseries Dexter: New Blood, a continuation of the series Dexter and the 100th overall episode of the series. The episode was written by supervising producer Tony Saltzman and directed by Sanford Bookstaver. It originally aired on Showtime on November 28, 2021, being also available on its streaming service at midnight on the same day.

The series follows Dexter Morgan after having faking his death on the original series finale. Dexter now lives in the fictional small town of Iron Lake, New York, hiding his identity under the name of Jim Lindsay, a local shopkeeper and having suppressed his killing urges. He is now in a relationship with Angela Bishop, the town's chief of police, and is beloved and respected in the town. A local troublemaker and the arrival of a mysterious person cause friction in his new life, as the past comes back to haunt him. In the episode, Dexter starts questioning Kurt's intentions when he claims to have seen his son recently. Also, Harrison avoids a potential school shooting but Dexter is suspicious of his story, wondering if his son was involved in starting the attack.

According to Nielsen Media Research, the episode was seen by an estimated 0.460 million household viewers and gained a 0.06 ratings share among adults aged 18–49. The episode received very positive reviews from critics. Critics praised the writing, Jack Alcott's acting, character development and answering questions over some storylines.

== Plot ==
Dexter (Michael C. Hall) talks with Debra (Jennifer Carpenter), questioning why Kurt (Clancy Brown) lied about Matt's state. Debra theorizes that Kurt wants the case closed so he can find the killer himself. Angela (Julia Jones) interrogates Kurt, who claims Matt is alive in New York.

At school, Harrison (Jack Alcott) listens to an episode of Molly Park's (Jamie Chung) podcast, "Merry Fucking Kill," where she talks about Arthur Mitchell/Trinity Killer. Harrison becomes unsettled when she talks about his mother, Rita, and how he killed her while he was left there in the blood. Dexter is later called to the school due to an emergency: Harrison has been stabbed, and Ethan (Christian Dell'Edera) is the perpetrator. Harrison tells the police that Ethan approached him to help him in a future school shooting to kill Ethan's bullies. When Harrison tried to get him some help, Ethan stabbed him in the stomach, forcing Harrison to almost fatally cut Ethan's leg. Dexter then talks with Debra, saying that the wounds don't match up with his story.

Dexter returns to the crime scene, where he proves his theory by imagining Debra stabbing him and then stabbing himself. The blood coincides with the stabs, but Dexter now deduces Harrison attacked Ethan first and then stabbed himself to know what it feels like, noting that it matches the "Code of Harry." Kurt later visits Dexter and Harrison at their house, where he gives Harrison a drone for his actions. While talking to him, Dexter lets it slip that he knows about Matt's boat incident. Angela also tells Dexter that they won't file charges against Harrison, even though Ethan claims he never attacked him. Angela also decides to collaborate with Molly, who uses her podcast to get information on many of the missing people the town failed to find.

Kurt is later approached by a girl named Chloe (Skyler Wright) at his diner, who asks for money. Kurt already lent her money and won't give her more, although he offers her a job at the diner, which she refuses. He later helps her by giving her shelter at the bunker where Lily stayed, revealing that he is the person behind her kidnapping and murder. At school, the police give a talk to the students who were on Ethan's "kill list," where the students applaud Harrison for his actions. Harrison uses the opportunity to call out Ethan's bullies, saying they drove him to become the person he is. During this, Dexter inspects Harrison's room, eventually discovering a straight razor hidden in a flashlight. A stunned Debra then mentions that Trinity also used a straight razor to murder his victims. A distraught Dexter comes to the belief that his son now has his own "Dark Passenger."

== Production ==
=== Development ===
In November 2021, it was announced that the fourth episode of the revived series would be titled "H Is for Hero", and was directed by Sanford Bookstaver and written by supervising producer Tony Saltzman.

=== Writing ===
On Harrison's possible "Dark Passenger", Michael C. Hall said, "I think that possibility is a part of the fun and the richness of that relationship. There are opposing things that are happening simultaneously for Dexter when it comes to Harrison and the dark passenger. On one hand, it's Dexter's deepest fear that his son has the dark passenger, and on the other hand it's his deepest wish, which makes parenting tricky." Showrunner Clyde Phillips added that Harrison's role was to make Dexter's "life upside down" and that they wanted to explore Harrison's possible inherited trauma with this new storyline. He further added, "We don't know if it's a dark passenger, but there is a darkness in Harrison that will emerge. I'll just leave it at that." Actor Jack Alcott described Harrison in the episode, saying "Harrison is such an absolute hurricane of emotions and states of mind. There is a piece of Harrison that wants to hurt people. But then there is the very human, self-awareness and empathy that his father doesn't really quite have."

== Reception ==
=== Viewers ===
In its original American broadcast, "H Is for Hero" was seen by an estimated 0.460 million household viewers and gained a 0.06 ratings share among adults aged 18–49, according to Nielsen Media Research. This means that 0.06 percent of all households with televisions watched the episode. This was a 41% increase in viewership from the previous episode, which was watched by 0.325 million viewers with a 0.09 in the 18-49 demographics.

=== Critical reviews ===
"H Is for Hero" received very positive reviews from critics. Matt Fowler of IGN gave the episode a "great" 8 out of 10 and wrote in his verdict, "'H is for Hero' transformed Harrison into a much more interesting, and potentially dangerous, addition to Dexter's life. It raised a lot of questions and presented us with a potential endgame for the series that not only feels like an awesome 'full circle' arc, but also one that makes for a great companion for the first four seasons."

Joshua Alston of The A.V. Club gave the episode an "A−" grade and wrote, "The reintroduction of Harrison puts New Blood in a position the Dexter franchise hasn't been in since the first season. It's perfectly set up to explore the central theme of whether a monster, with proper care and feeding, can be assimilated into society and at what cost. By leaning into those ideas, 'H Is For Hero' instantly becomes more interesting and more poignant than the episodes leading up to it. The episode's central mystery grows out of what initially looked to be New Blood's goofiest storyline."

Kelly McClure of Vulture gave the episode a 4 star out of 5 rating and wrote, "For a show that started out a shit show and is turning into something that's actually fun to watch... anything can happen from here." Nick Harley of Den of Geek gave the episode a 4 star out of 5 rating and wrote, "This is a lean, but highly effective episode, with a clear theme, interesting developments, and old rhythms presented in new ways. A confrontation between Dexter and Harrison feels imminent, but I'm also intrigued by how characters like Molly and Edward Olsen will fit in the grand scheme of things. If every episode is as tight and focused as this, then there may be life in Dexter: New Blood yet." Mary Littlejohn of TV Fanatic gave the episode a 4.5 star out of 5 rating and wrote, "In so many ways, 'classic' Dexter was on our screens again. Even though he hasn't killed in a while, you get the sense that this new connection to his son might sate his hunger."
