= Dexter: New Blood =

American crime drama mystery miniseries

- Genre: Crime drama; Mystery
- Based on: Dexter by Jeff Lindsay
- Developed by: Clyde Phillips
- Showrunner: Clyde Phillips
- Starring: Michael C. Hall; Jack Alcott; Julia Jones; Johnny Sequoyah; Alano Miller; Jennifer Carpenter; Clancy Brown
- Music by: Pat Irwin
- Country of origin: United States
- Original language: English
- No. of episodes: 10

Production
- Executive producers: Clyde Phillips; Scott Reynolds; Michael C. Hall; Marcos Siega; Bill Carraro; John Goldwyn; Sara Colleton
- Producers: Adam Brightman; Judson Schwartz
- Cinematography: Hillary Fyfe Spera; Michael Watson
- Editors: Perri Frank; Katie Ennis; David Leonard
- Running time: 44–58 minutes
- Production companies: Clyde Phillips Productions; John Goldwyn Production; The Colleton Company; Showtime Networks

Original release
- Network: Showtime
- Release: November 7, 2021 – January 9, 2022

Related
- Dexter; Dexter: Original Sin; Dexter: Resurrection

Dexter: New Blood is an American crime drama mystery television miniseries developed by Clyde Phillips for Showtime. A continuation of the television series Dexter (2006–2013), it features Michael C. Hall and Jennifer Carpenter reprising their roles as Dexter and Debra Morgan, respectively, alongside new cast members Jack Alcott, Julia Jones, Johnny Sequoyah, Alano Miller, and Clancy Brown. The story is set ten years after the events of the original series finale, "Remember the Monsters?", which was broadcast in 2013. It aired on Showtime from November 7, 2021, to January 9, 2022.

The series was followed by Dexter: Original Sin in 2024, a prequel series with a frame story picking up from the final scene of New Blood, and a sequel series, Dexter: Resurrection.

== Premise ==
After faking his death 10 years before in a hurricane, Dexter Morgan has moved to the fictional small town of Iron Lake, in upstate New York, hiding his identity under the name of Jim Lindsay, a clerk at a local wilderness sporting gear store. He has a romantic relationship with the town's chief of police, Angela Bishop, and has succeeded in suppressing his vigilante serial killing urges. Dexter's deceased sister, Debra, is an imaginary presence to whom he often speaks.

In the first episode, Dexter's estranged son from his previous life, Harrison Morgan, arrives unannounced with mysterious motives. A string of incidents around Iron Lake causes Dexter to fear that the "Dark Passenger" within him, and potentially within his son, will reveal itself.

== Cast ==
=== Main ===
- Michael C. Hall as Dexter Morgan / Jim Lindsay
- Jack Alcott as Harrison Morgan
- Julia Jones as Police Chief Angela Bishop
- Johnny Sequoyah as Audrey Bishop
- Alano Miller as Sergeant Logan
- Jennifer Carpenter as Debra Morgan
- Clancy Brown as Kurt Caldwell

=== Special guest stars ===
- David Zayas as Angel Batista
- John Lithgow as Arthur Mitchell / Trinity Killer

=== Recurring ===
- David Magidoff as Teddy Reed
- Katy Sullivan as Esther
- Michael Cyril Creighton as Fred Jr.
- Gizel Jiménez as Tess Silvera
- Gregory Cruz as Abraham Brown
- Jamie Chung as Molly Park
- Shuler Hensley as Elric Kane

== Episodes ==
No.	Title	Directed by	Written by	Original release date	U.S. viewers (millions)
1	"Cold Snap"	Marcos Siega	Teleplay by : Clyde Phillips; Story by : Clyde Phillips & Adam Rapp	November 7, 2021	0.678
Ten years after faking his death, Dexter Morgan is living in Iron Lake under the name Jim Lindsay. Dexter sees his sister Debra as hallucinations and follows a strict routine to avoid killing again, having gone 10 years without doing it. Dexter is in a relationship with the town's sheriff, Angela Bishop. At work, Dexter meets Matt Caldwell, who begins to awaken his Dark Passenger; he checks his criminal record and sells him a rifle. Harrison goes to Dexter's house, but Dexter claims not to be his father. When Dexter personally delivers the rifle to Matt's house, Matt's friend Billy reveals that he covered for Matt at a trial to get him acquitted, as he killed five people in a boating accident. One morning, Dexter approaches a white deer and while petting it, Matt kills the deer, nearly hitting Dexter; Dexter knocks him unconscious and his Dark Passenger resurfaces. Dexter quickly sets up a room to kill Matt, who begs him not to, but Dexter kills him and decides not to keep any trophies. Dexter goes to find Harrison, reveals he is his father, and takes him home.
2	"Storm of Fuck"	Marcos Siega	Warren Hsu Leonard	November 14, 2021	0.560
Dexter has a conversation with Harrison, discovering that Hannah McKay died of pancreatic cancer years ago and that Harrison was placed in foster care system, beginning his search for Dexter. The next morning, the police set up base at Dexter's house to search for Matt. When Dexter finds the deer, he sends Harrison after Angela to doctor the crime scene and frame Matt as a runaway. Harrison meets Angela's daughter, Audrey, and spends the afternoon with her friends and her, who are suspicious of Harrison. Dexter and Angela have a conversation about the challenges of raising a child, agreeing to help each other with their own. Just as the search for Matt is about to be called off, Kurt Caldwell convinces Angela to keep it going. Dexter reveals that he left Harrison to keep him safe and promises to be a better father. A young woman lost in Iron Lake is staying at a shelter, unaware that she is being watched by a man; she finally realizes she has been kidnapped and sees the phrase "You're already dead" under a camera in her room.
3	"Smoke Signals"	Sanford Bookstaver	David McMillan	November 21, 2021	0.325
Harrison starts high school and is given an aptitude test; he is accused of cheating because the results are exceptionally good, and Dexter is unsupportive. Harrison ends up getting a good grade on the retake. Angela tells Dexter that they will send dogs to search the area the next day, when Matt was found to have been not alone and may have been attacked. Dexter begins looking for a way to dispose of Matt's body but is unsuccessful. Harrison meets Ethan at school, who is being bullied by Audrey's friends; Harrison encourages him to stand up for himself and helps him. Sergeant Logan questions Dexter about Matt's disappearance, as he was in the area that day and does not raise suspicions. Dexter has dinner with Angela and the kids, and Audrey and Harrison suggest donating the deer to the Seneca for a funeral. At the funeral, Dexter apologizes to Harrison and finds a way to get rid of Matt by burning him in an incinerator. In town, Dexter gives a ride to a drunken Kurt, who claims that Matt is alive and that he had a video call with him. The man who kidnapped the woman lets her go, only to shoot her dead as she flees.
4	"H Is for Hero"	Sanford Bookstaver	Tony Saltzman	November 28, 2021	0.460
One morning, Dexter receives an alert about an incident at school and discovers that Harrison is involved; his son claims he prevented a shooting, Ethan attacked him, and he attacked him, too. The next morning, Dexter discovers that the incident did not happen the way Harrison claimed and decides to investigate on his own. Dexter goes to the crime scene and learns from the blood spatter that Harrison attacked Ethan and Ethan did not do anything to him. Angela tells Molly Park, a true-crime podcaster, that she became a cop after her friend Iris disappeared and believes other missing women have suffered a horrible fate; Molly proposes an alliance to uncover the truth, and Angela accepts. In a speech, Harrison claims that Ethan is also a victim. Dexter finds in Harrison's bedroom the weapon he used against Ethan, a straight razor, the same one Arthur Mitchell used to murder his mother, Rita Bennet, while he was present; Dexter discovers his son also has a Dark Passenger. Kurt takes Chloe, a homeless girl, to the cabin where the man murdered the previous woman.
5	"Runaway"	Marcos Siega	Veronica West	December 5, 2021	0.549
Harrison goes to a party with other students, where he consumes drugs, overdosing because one was laced with fentanyl. Dexter plans to kill the dealer who supplied the drugs, but Logan arrives before Dexter can sedate him. He discovers the identity of the person who makes the pills, whom he plans to kill, but is forced to improvise on the table after being interrupted by Logan; Dexter instead forces him to snort pure fentanyl powder, causing an overdose. Kurt brings the homeless girl to his place. She refuses to play into Kurt's plan; instead, she runs at Kurt, who is then forced to shoot her in the face, making him frustrated. Angela and Molly visit New York City, where they learn Matt did not check into the hotel, and Kurt lied to them. Angela discovers Dexter's real identity after recalling her conversation with Angel Batista, his former colleague from Miami, at a police convention.
6	"Too Many Tuna Sandwiches"	Marcos Siega	Scott Reynolds & Warren Hsu Leonard	December 12, 2021	0.695
Angela's relationship with Dexter is strained after discovering it was built on a lie. Dexter finds out that Kurt is a serial killer. Angela finds her long lost friend's body in Clark Caves and calls Dexter for his crime-scene analysis skills. Harrison's dark passenger is revealed again in a school wrestling match, and Dexter does not know how to handle it.
7	"Skin of Her Teeth"	Sanford Bookstaver	Teleplay by : Veronica West & Kirsa Rein; Story by : Veronica West & Kirsa Rein & Alexandra Salerno	December 19, 2021	0.713
Dexter and Angela find seemingly incriminating DNA evidence against Kurt linking him to Iris' murder. Angela arrests him, though Dexter's suspicions that it will not be enough to get Kurt convicted later prove true. The DNA deterioration can only prove a familial match, and Kurt claims the DNA belongs to his father. One of Kurt's associates hands Harrison an envelope to deliver to Dexter, which contains a titanium screw. Dexter later deduces that it belonged to Matt but did not melt in the incinerator and that Kurt knows Dexter murdered his son. Molly points to holes in Dexter's story when questioned by Angela. Harrison reveals that he remembers his mother's murder and decides to leave town. Dexter tries to follow but is attacked by Kurt's associate.
8	"Unfair Game"	Sanford Bookstaver	Tony Saltzman & David McMillan	December 26, 2021	0.566
Dexter escapes from his captor but is wounded and pursued through the snow. He later gains the upper hand and forces the man to confess Kurt's plans before killing him. Angela investigates and begins to suspect that Dexter murdered the drug dealer after connecting similar needle marks on the other drug dealer. Kurt lures Harrison to his cabin, where he intends to kill him in front of Dexter as soon as Dexter arrives. He flees, though, after Dexter attempts to run him over. Dexter opens up to Harrison about their shared dark passenger.
9	"The Family Business"	Marcos Siega	Scott Reynolds	January 2, 2022	0.576
Dexter tells Harrison about the Dark Passenger and the code his father Harry taught him, along with a story about a pedophile clown but omits the part where he kills him. On Christmas Day, Dexter and Harrison bond and go to Angela's house to celebrate Christmas; Kurt shows up and they leave to look for evidence on him. Angela begins to suspect that Dexter is the Bay Harbor Butcher. Searching for evidence on Kurt, Harrison tells Dexter that he always wanted to kill Mitchell. The two find a trapdoor and discover all the missing women, mummified as trophies. Harrison tells Dexter that he knows he kills his victims and accepts it. Kurt, who has burned down Dexter's cabin, tries to escape but is captured. Dexter kills Kurt with Harrison in front of him and they burn Kurt's body. Homeless, Dexter and Harrison move into Angela's house; she receives a letter from Kurt.
10	"Sins of the Father"	Marcos Siega	Teleplay by : Clyde Phillips; Story by : Clyde Phillips & Alexandra Franklin & Marc Muszynski	January 9, 2022	0.815
Angela arrests Dexter for the murder of Matt Caldwell. When he rebuts all the evidence she brings forward against him, she contacts Batista, who is shocked to learn Dexter is still alive. Backed into a corner, Dexter tells Angela about Kurt's bunker, and she abruptly leaves him in the care of Logan to investigate. Dexter breaks his code once again and kills Logan to escape from his cell and reunite with Harrison. Angela finds the bunker. Preparing to flee from town, Dexter gets into an argument with Harrison, who realizes that Dexter killed Logan, an innocent man. They come to the conclusion that his code is flawed, that Harrison is not like him and that the only way for Harrison to be "normal" is for Dexter to die. He instructs Harrison to shoot him with the rifle. Before Harrison shoots him, Dexter muses internally that he feels love for the first time. Angela arrives to the aftermath of the shooting, gives Harrison some money, and tells him to leave town and never return, as she prepares to take responsibility for Dexter's death. Harrison reads Dexter's letter to Hannah before driving out of town.

== Production ==
=== Development ===
The series finale of Dexter, in which Dexter flees Miami and ends up as a lumberjack in Oregon, was polarizing to the show's fans, according to lead actor Michael C. Hall. He said "I think the ending was 'mystifying' at best to people. 'Confounding', 'exasperating', 'frustrating' — on down the line of negative adjectives." Hall had been asked by fans in the eight years since the finale aired if there would be a follow-up to the show. Original showrunner Clyde Phillips, who had left the series after season 4, saw those questions asked of Hall and over time discussed possible ways to continue Dexter as some type of redemption but could not figure out an appropriate route. Phillips was contacted by Showtime president Gary Levine on July 1, 2019. Levine told Phillips that he felt the time was right to bring back Dexter and asked if Phillips could come up with something. Phillips wrote a preliminary script which he then shared with Hall, who loved the idea.

Phillips recognized the ending had suited the time when it was broadcast, as around 2013, there were a number of real-life serial killers known to be living in Oregon and nearby states. Phillips also considered that by surrounding himself with chainsaws, Dexter was under a constant reminder about how his mother had died. As Phillips was unsure of the intent that the finale was meant to deliver, he decided to incorporate a major timeskip, nearly a decade from the end of events of the original series. Dexter has since moved to the fictional town of Iron Lake and is living under a pseudonym, working in an outfitter shop selling guns for hunting and has ingratiated himself comfortably into the local community. Because of that, Phillips did not consider the miniseries as a ninth season. As the writing staff wrote out the ten-episode miniseries, they established how the series would end and wrote backwards from that. Phillips claimed that "The ending of this one will be stunning, shocking, surprising, unexpected. And without jinxing anything, I will say that the ending of this new season that we're doing will blow up the internet."

On October 14, 2020, the Dexter revival was ordered as a limited series consisting of 10 episodes, starring Hall in his original role, with Phillips returning as showrunner. On November 17, 2020, it was announced Marcos Siega would direct six of the ten episodes of the limited series as well as serving as an executive producer alongside Hall, John Goldwyn, Sara Colleton, Bill Carraro, and Scott Reynolds. It premiered on November 7, 2021, on Showtime. While a second season had been considered, Showtime ceased moving forward on it by the end of January 2023, instead pivoting to a prequel series about a younger Dexter.

=== Casting ===
In January 2021, Clancy Brown, Julia Jones, Alano Miller, Johnny Sequoyah, Jack Alcott, and David Magidoff joined the main cast. On February 11, 2021, Jamie Chung and Oscar Wahlberg were cast in recurring roles. On June 28, 2021, John Lithgow joined the cast to reprise his role as Arthur Mitchell, the Trinity Killer, in a cameo appearance. On July 13, 2021, it was announced that original series regular Jennifer Carpenter would reprise her role as Dexter's sister Debra in some capacity for the limited series. On August 24, 2021, it was reported that Carpenter is confirmed to reprise her role as a series regular, appearing as Dexter's "imaginary iteration of Debra".

=== Filming ===
Production began in February 2021, with most of the show filmed in Shelburne Falls, Massachusetts, serving as a stand-in for Iron Lake. Exterior filming had to be coordinated around the weather, as the creators wanted to have a significant amount of snow in those shots, including a local frozen lake. Interior filming at New England Studios started around July 2021 over a fifty-day period. The series developer Clyde Phillips said there were 119 days of filming.

Additional filming locations were on Rt 117 in Lancaster, Grafton, Bolton (Nashoba Regional High), and Shirley (Bull Run Restaurant), Massachusetts.

== Reception ==
=== Critical response ===
Review aggregator Rotten Tomatoes reported an approval rating of 77% based on 56 reviews, with an average rating of 7.20/10. The website's critics consensus reads, "Anchored by Michael C. Hall's still-compelling portrayal of the title character, Dexter: New Blood helps restore some of the luster lost by the show's contentious finale." Metacritic gave the series a weighted average score of 61 out of 100 based on 29 critic reviews, indicating "generally favorable reviews".

Hall also won TVLine's Performer of the Week ending January 15, 2022, for the finale episode.

=== Ratings ===
Viewership and ratings per episode of Dexter: New Blood
No.	Title	Air date	Rating (18–49)	Viewers (millions)	DVR (18–49)	DVR viewers (millions)	Total (18–49)	Total viewers (millions)
1	"Cold Snap"	November 7, 2021	0.20	0.678	TBD	TBD	TBD	TBD
2	"Storm of Fuck"	November 14, 2021	0.12	0.560	TBD	TBD	TBD	TBD
3	"Smoke Signals"	November 21, 2021	0.09	0.325	0.09	0.349	0.15	0.674
4	"H Is for Hero"	November 28, 2021	0.06	0.460	0.13	0.613	0.19	1.073
5	"Runaway"	December 5, 2021	0.11	0.549	0.12	0.497	0.23	1.046
6	"Too Many Tuna Sandwiches"	December 12, 2021	0.15	0.695	TBD	TBD	TBD	TBD
7	"Skin of Her Teeth"	December 19, 2021	0.15	0.713	TBD	TBD	TBD	TBD
8	"Unfair Game"	December 26, 2021	0.11	0.566	TBD	TBD	TBD	TBD
9	"The Family Business"	January 2, 2022	0.11	0.576	TBD	TBD	TBD	TBD
10	"Sins of the Father"	January 9, 2022	0.16	0.814	TBD	TBD	TBD	TBD

=== Awards and nominations ===
Award	Date of ceremony (Note: The year listed refers to when the awards ceremony took place, not necessarily when the nominated episode was broadcast.)	Category	Nominee(s)	Result	Ref.
Hollywood Critics Association TV Awards	August 13, 2022	Best Writing in a Broadcast Network or Cable Series, Drama	Clyde Phillips, Alexandra Franklin, and Marc Muszynski (for "Sins of the Father")	Nominated	
Saturn Awards	October 25, 2022	Best Action-Thriller Television Series: Network/Cable	Dexter: New Blood	Nominated	
Saturn Awards	October 25, 2022	Best Actor in a Network or Cable Television Series	Michael C. Hall	Nominated	
Saturn Awards	October 25, 2022	Best Supporting Actress in a Network or Cable Television Series	Julia Jones	Nominated	
Saturn Awards	October 25, 2022	Best Performance by a Younger Actor in a Network or Cable Television Series	Jack Alcott	Nominated	
Shorty Awards	2022	Audience Honor in Television	Dexter: New Blood	Won	
Shorty Awards	2022	Best in Television	Dexter: New Blood	Won	

== Future ==
A prequel series titled Dexter: Original Sin has been released with a straight-to-series order. The series premiered on December 13, 2024, on Showtime. A sequel series titled Dexter: Resurrection, picking up after New Blood and the frame story of Original Sin, was announced with Michael C. Hall reprising his role as Dexter at San Diego Comic-Con on July 26, 2024. It premiered on Paramount+ with Showtime in July 2025.
