= Cold snap (disambiguation) =

A cold snap, also known as a cold wave, is a period of intensely cold and dry weather.

Cold snap may also refer to:

- Coldsnap, an expansion set for the trading card game Magic: The Gathering from the Ice Age block
- Coldsnap, a member of DC Comics Masters of Disaster supervillain team
- Cold Snap (Albert Collins album), 1986
- Cold Snap (Weeping Tile album), 1996
- "Cold Snap" (Heroes), an episode from the fourth season of the TV series Heroes
- ”Cold Snap” (Dexter: New Blood), is the premiere episode of the sequel TV series Dexter: New Blood
