= Jay Cramer =

American actor and comedian (died 2025)

- Cramer in Grey's Anatomy, 2013
- Died: May 18, 2025
- Occupations: Actor, comedian
- Spouse: Katy Sullivan

Jay Cramer (died May 18, 2025) was an American actor and comedian. A quadriplegic, he guest-starred in television programs including Mr. Mayor, Desperate Housewives, NCIS: Los Angeles and Grey's Anatomy.

Cramer died on May 18, 2025.
