= David Magidoff =

American actor and comedian

- Magidoff at Edinburgh Fringe Festival 2026
- Born: Manhasset, New York, U.S.
- Education: University of Southern California (BA)
- Occupations: Actor, comedian
- Years active: 2002–present
- Notable work: The Morning Show (Nicky Brooks); Dexter: New Blood / Dexter: Resurrection (Teddy Reed); HQ Trivia (host)

David Magidoff is an American actor and comedian known for his portrayal of Teddy Reed in Dexter: New Blood and Dexter: Resurrection, and Nicky Brooks in The Morning Show.

== Early life ==
Magidoff was born in Manhasset, New York, and raised in Marlboro, New Jersey, where he attended Marlboro High School. He graduated from the University of Southern California with degrees in both Creative Writing and Theater. While at school, he wrote and performed in the Brand New Theatre, collaborating with fellow students Rob Kerkovich and Patrick J. Adams.

== Career ==
Magidoff made his television debut as Stan Wexler on the NBC drama TV series American Dreams (2002–2005). He went on to star as Jeff Ratner on Veronica Mars (2004–2007) and Nicky Brooks on The Morning Show (2019–present).

In 2021, Magidoff landed the role of Officer Teddy Reed in the Showtime limited series, Dexter: New Blood. His other television credits include ER, Greek, NCIS, CSI, Lethal Weapon, General Hospital, and Impeachment: American Crime Story. Magidoff also hosted MTV's Broke Ass Game Show (2015–2016) and the mobile trivia game, HQ Trivia. In March 2025, it was reported that Magidoff will reprise his role as Teddy Reed in Dexter: Resurrection, which premiered in 2025.

== Filmography ==
=== Television ===
Year	Title	Role	Notes
2025	Dexter: Resurrection	Teddy Reed	3 episodes
2022	The Cleaning Lady	Jay	1 episode
2021-2022	Dexter: New Blood	Teddy Reed	10 episodes
2021	Side Hustle	Sholly	1 episode
2021	American Crime Story: Impeachment	David	1 episode
2019-2020	Top Elf	Eggnog Shimmerhorn	10 episodes
2019	Schooled	Doctor	1 episode
2019	The Morning Show	Nicky Brooks	6 episodes
2018	Cousins for Life	Wizard	1 episode
2018	General Hospital	Devon	1 episode
2017	Lethal Weapon	Tour Guide	1 episode
2015	Richie Rich	Bixby Knox	1 episode
2014	Austin & Ally	Zip	1 episode
2013	The Damned Truth		TV series
2012	CSI: Crime Scene Investigation	Marko Palmisano	1 episode
2012	NCIS: Los Angeles	College Kid	1 episode
2010	NCIS	Michael Seelus	1 episode
2009	Sonny with a Chance	Assistant	1 episode
2009	My Date	James	1 episode
2008	Imagination Movers	Wayne	1 episode
2008	Greek	Neil	1 episode
2007	ER	Jeffrey	1 episode
2006-2007	Veronica Mars	Jeff Ratner	3 episodes
2007	The House Webshow	Lyle	TV series
2006	Zoey 101	Pool Guy	1 episode
2005	Las Vegas	Geek	1 episode
2004-2005	American Dreams	Stan Wexler	2 episodes

=== Film ===
Year	Title	Role	Notes
2024	Museum Worthy	Advertising Executive	Short film
2021	Table Talk	Sam	Short film
2017	A Grain of White Rice in the Endless Yellow Sun	Jesse Anderson	Short film
2016	Earworm	Jel (voice)	Short film
2013	The Audition	Casting Director	Short film
2011	The Lion of Judah	Peter (voice)	
2007	Sex and Death 101	Video Store Geek	
