= Broke Ass Game Show =

American television game show

- Genre: Game Show
- Presented by: Derek Gaines; David Magidoff
- Starring: Spencer Ebba; Chew the Coop
- Country of origin: United States
- Original language: English
- No. of seasons: 2
- No. of episodes: 24

Production
- Executive producers: Rhett Bachner; Brien Meagher; Adam Dolgins; Peter Herschko
- Running time: 22 minutes
- Production company: B-17 Entertainment

Original release
- Network: MTV
- Release: February 5, 2015 – February 11, 2016

Broke Ass Game Show (stylized as Broke A$$ Game Show) is an American television game show hosted by Derek Gaines and David Magidoff. The series premiered on MTV on February 5, 2015.

== Episodes ==
=== Series overview ===
Season	Episodes	Originally released	
Season	Episodes	First released	Last released
1	8	February 5, 2015	March 26, 2015
2	16	October 4, 2015	February 11, 2016

=== Season 1 (2015) ===
No. overall	No. in season	Title	Original release date	US viewers (millions)
1	1	"Twerk Off"	February 5, 2015	0.75
2	2	"Sext & the City"	February 12, 2015	0.66
3	3	"Nuns of Anarchy"	February 19, 2015	0.69
4	4	"Chew the Coop"	February 26, 2015	0.58
5	5	"Shrub and Tug"	March 5, 2015	0.63
6	6	"Cotton Candy Sasquatch"	March 12, 2015	0.70
7	7	"Nothing But Nut"	March 19, 2015	0.63
8	8	"Grow a Pair"	March 26, 2015	0.52

=== Season 2 (2015–16) ===
No. overall	No. in season	Title	Original release date	US viewers (millions)
9	1	"Uptown Dunk"	October 8, 2015	0.41
10	2	"Bravefart"	October 15, 2015	0.37
11	3	"Canoe York City"	October 22, 2015	0.50
12	4	"Stiff Arm"	October 29, 2015	0.42
13	5	"Blow Money Blow Problems"	November 5, 2015	0.41
14	6	"Cash Hole"	November 12, 2015	0.35
15	7	"Nutflix"	November 19, 2015	0.40
16	8	"Clock Block"	December 3, 2015	0.29
17	9	"Who's Behind the Meat Curtain?"	December 10, 2015	0.38
18	10	"Slob on My Cob"	December 17, 2015	0.30
19	11	"Uniconing"	January 7, 2016	0.39
20	12	"Ass Seen on TV"	January 14, 2016	0.28
21	13	"69 Problems"	January 21, 2016	0.38
22	14	"Gramp Stamped"	January 28, 2016	0.29
23	15	"You Got Soft Served"	February 4, 2016	0.25
24	16	"UrbanTroutfitters"	February 11, 2016	0.22
