= Sara Colleton =

American television and film producer

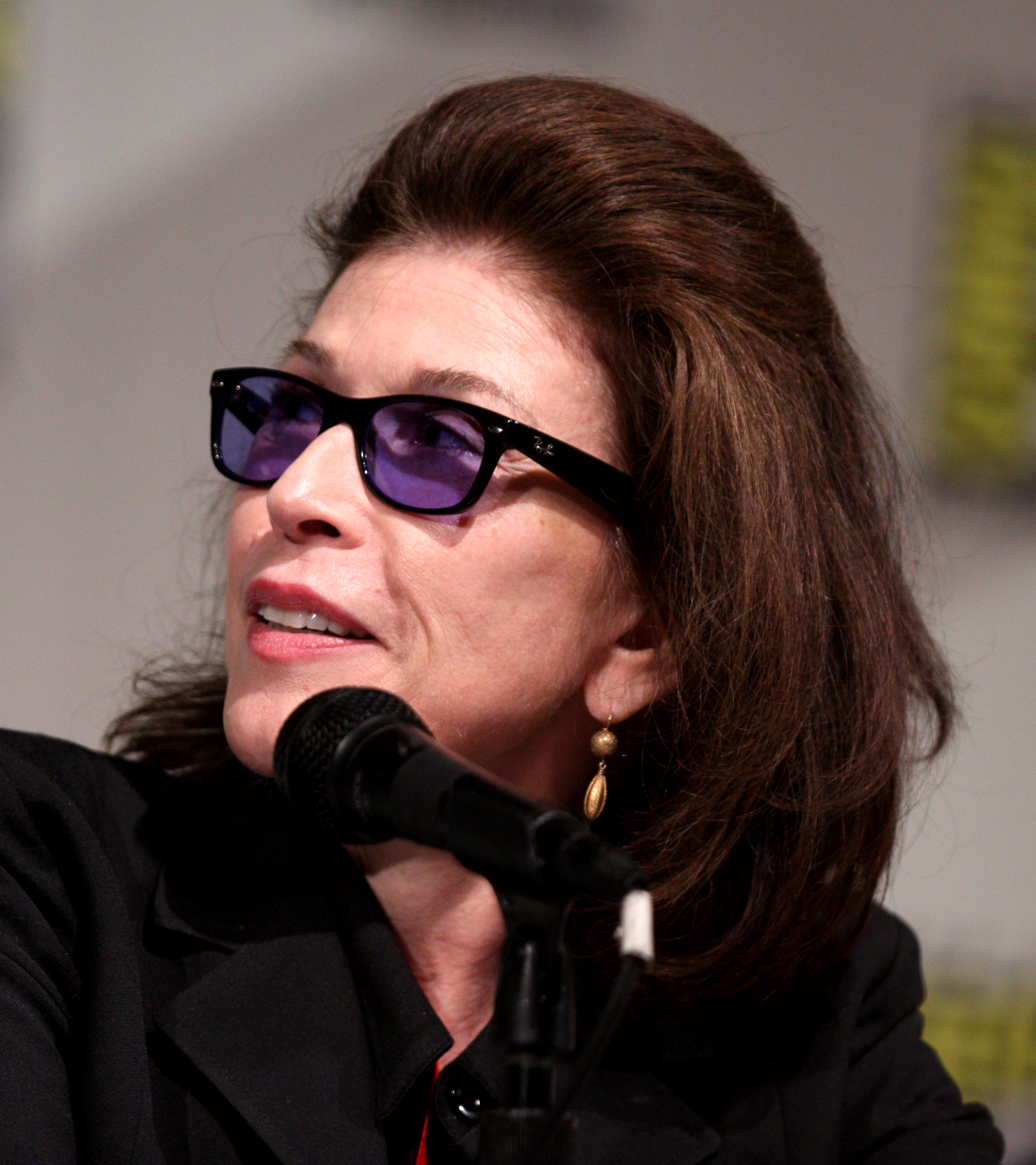
- Colleton at San Diego Comic-Con in July 2011.
- Occupation: Producer

Sara Colleton is an American television and film producer. She has worked as an executive producer on the Showtime drama series Dexter since 2006 and has received several Emmy nominations for her work on the series.

== Career ==
Colleton joined the crew of the Showtime drama series Dexter as an executive producer for the pilot episode in 2006. She returned as an executive producer for the first season. She has remained an executive producer since. As an executive producer she was co-nominated for the Outstanding Drama Series award at the 60th Primetime Emmy Awards.
