= Gizel Jiménez =

American actress

- Jiménez in 2026
- Born: Miami, Florida, U.S.
- Education: New World School of the Arts
- Occupation: Actress
- Years active: 2013-present
- Television: Dexter: New Blood

Gizel Jiménez is an American actress.

== Early life ==
Born in Miami, she was raised in New York until the age of 13 when she moved to Florida. She attended Coral Reef High School where she competed in classical vocal competitions. She was later accepted into the New World School of the Arts in Miami, graduating with a BFA in musical theatre.

== Career ==
=== Stage ===
Her first professional job was a Broadway tour, cast as Rosalia in West Side Story. In 2013, she performed at the Walnut Street Theatre in In the Heights. In 2015, she appeared in a production of the musical The Theory of Relativity at the Norma Terris Theatre in Chester, Connecticut, her first show with the theatrical group Goodspeed Musicals.

In 2018, she appeared in a production of Alice by Heart at Vassar College & New York Stage and Film’s Powerhouse Theatre. In 2018 she appeared as Kate Monster in New York in Avenue Q. That year, she was nominated for a Drama Desk Award for Outstanding Actress in a Musical for her role in stage musical Miss You Like Hell. She also performed at the ceremony.

The following year, she appeared in Stephen Bracket directed production of Reefer Madness. She also joined the Broadway production of Wicked playing Nessarose at the Gershwin Theatre.

In 2020, she was Princess Piper in the original cast of Bliss the Musical in Seattle's 5th Avenue Theatre.

=== Film and television ===
She made her first television appearance in an episode of Law & Order SVU called "Presumed Guilty." She was the female lead in a short film called Timmy Two Chins and was also in a commercial with comedian Nick Kroll for Comedy Central.

She appeared in 2021 musical film Tick, Tick... Boom!. She had a recurring role as Tess on Showtime television series Dexter: New Blood in 2022. In 2024, she played Mel on Apple TV+ television series Bad Monkey.

=== Music ===
She sings on the 2024 Lin-Manuel Miranda and Eisa Davis concept album Warriors.

== Personal life ==
She is the daughter of Cuban immigrants, with her mother Nancy from Havana, and her father Pedro from Santa Clara.
