= Johnny Sequoyah =

American actress

- Sequoyah in 2026
- Born: Johnny Sequoyah Friedenberg; October 25, 2002 (age 24); Boise, Idaho, U.S.
- Occupation: Actress
- Years active: 2011–present
- Notable work: Believe; Dexter: New Blood; Primate
- Mother: Heather Rae

Johnny Sequoyah Friedenberg (born October 25, 2002) is an American actress, best known for her roles as Bo Adams on the NBC television series Believe and Audrey Bishop on the Dexter revival miniseries Dexter: New Blood.

== Early life ==
Sequoyah was born in Boise, Idaho, and spent her first eight years there.

== Career ==
She began acting at age eight in independent films. In 2013 and 2014, she appeared in Ass Backwards and I Believe in Unicorns. She starred in Among Ravens, directed by her father, Russell Friedenberg, and produced by her mother, Heather Rae.

In 2014, she appeared in the thriller film Wind Walkers, also directed by her father. Her most notable role was Bo Adams in the NBC television series Believe. In 2016, she portrayed Taylor Otto in the pilot for the ABC series American Housewife, but was replaced by Meg Donnelly before the series was picked up by the network.

In August 2019, it was announced that Sequoyah had joined the cast of Love, Victor, the Hulu sequel series to the 2018 film Love, Simon, set to play the role of Mia. However, later that month, the role was recast with Rachel Hilson due to a decision to take the character in a new creative direction. In 2021, Sequoyah played Audrey on the Dexter revival miniseries Dexter: New Blood.

== Filmography ==
=== Film ===
Year	Title	Role	Notes
2013	Ass Backwards	School girl	Uncredited
2014	I Believe in Unicorns	Girl on scooter	
2014	Among Ravens	Joey	
2015	Wind Walkers	Willow Samuelson	
2016	Albion: The Enchanted Stallion	Molly	
2025	Primate	Lucy Pinborough	

=== Television ===
Year	Title	Role	Notes
2014	Believe	Bo Adams	Lead (13 episodes)
2016	American Housewife	Taylor Otto	Episode: "Pilot"
2021–2022	Dexter: New Blood	Audrey Bishop	Main cast (10 episodes)
