= Alano Miller =

American actor (born 1980)

- Born: 1980 (age 45–46); Orlando, Florida, U.S.
- Occupation: Actor
- Years active: 2008–present
- Spouse: DeWanda Wise (m. 2009)

Alano Herberto Miller (born 1980) is an American actor. He is best known for his role as Cato on the short-lived WGN America drama series Underground.

== Early life ==
Miller was born and raised in Orlando, Florida, U.S. He is of Cuban, Bahamian, and Jamaican descent. Miller attended high school in Dayton Beach, where he worked as a lifeguard. In his adolescent years, he struggled with weight and body image.

Miller earned a Bachelor of Fine Arts degree from SUNY Purchase Conservatory of Theater Arts and Film. In 2008, Miller earned a Master of Fine Arts degree from Penn State University.

== Career ==
In 2012, Miller's film career began in All Wifed Out. Miller is known for his role in the 2016 film Loving. In December 2016, Miller was nominated for the 48th NAACP Image Award for Outstanding Supporting Actor in a Motion Picture.

== Personal life ==
Miller currently resides in Pasadena, California. On June 26, 2009, he married fellow actress DeWanda Wise after three months of dating. Both Miller and Wise are vegan.

== Filmography ==
=== Film ===
Year	Title	Role	Notes
2008	Champagne	Chris	Short film
2010	Loop Planes	Junior	Short film
2010	Pour aimer, encore	Vaughn	Short film
2010	Hector is Gonna Kill Nate	Nate	Short film
2012	All Wifed Out	Kevin	Feature film debut
2013	Wish You Well	Eugene Randal	
2016	Loving	Raymond Green	
2017	White Face	—N/a	Short film; Executive Producer
2020	Sylvie's Love	Lacy	

=== Television ===
Year	Title	Role	Notes
2011	Royal Pains	Jeff	Television debut Episode: "A Man Called Grandpa"
2011	How to Make It in America	Malik	Episode: "What's in a Name?"
2012	Damages	Video Chat Informant	2 episodes
2012	Vegas	Ray Humphries	Episode: "All That Glitter"
2013	Golden Boy	Deaundre	Episode: "Pilot"
2013	Person of Interest	Robert Johnson/R.J. Phillips	Episode: "Liberty"
2013	Ironside	Sergeant Seth Courier	Episode: "Brothers in Arms"
2014	Stalker	Troy Gunn	Episode: "Pilot"
2014	Wild Blue	Joaquin Tate	Television Movie
2014–2018	Jane the Virgin	Aaron Zazo/Roman Zazo	Recurring role, 10 episodes
2015	NCIS	Vince Armstrong	Episode: "We Build, We Fight"
2015	Battle Creek	Joey	Episode: "Man's Best Friend"
2016	Atlanta	Franklin Montague	Episode: "B.A.N."
2016–2017	Underground	Cato	Main cast, 20 episodes
2017	Shots Fired	Dom	Episode: "Hour Seven: Content of Their Character"
2017	Halt and Catch Fire	Gavin Green	3 episodes
2020	Cherish the Day	Evan Fisher	Main cast
2021–2022	Dexter: New Blood	Logan	Main cast
2023–present	The Morning Show	Marcus Hunter	7 episodes

== Awards and recognitions ==
- 1997 Presidential Scholar Award

== See also ==
- NAACP Image Award for Outstanding Supporting Actor in a Motion Picture
