= Katy Sullivan =

American Paralympic track and field athlete and actress

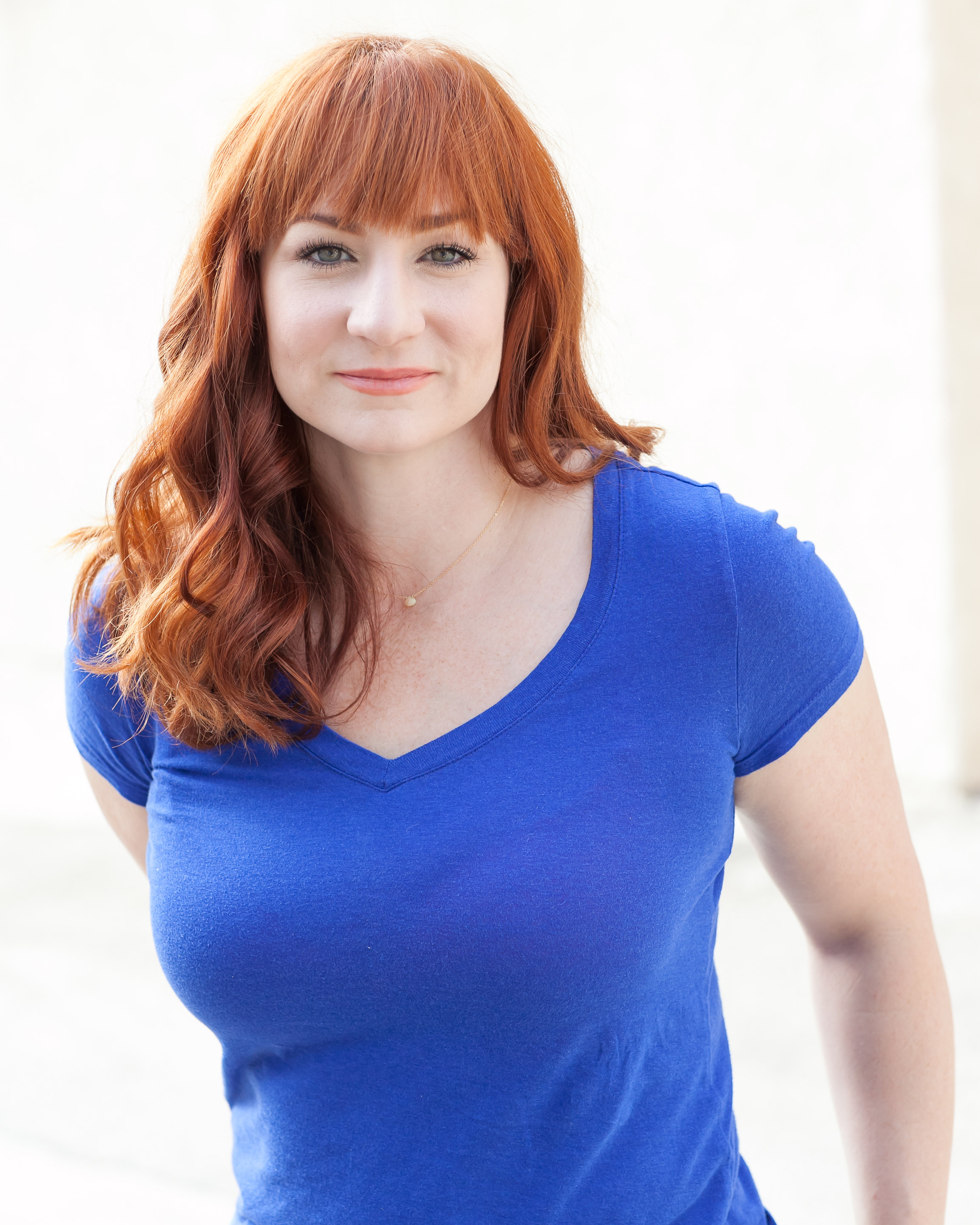
- Education: Webster University (BFA)
- Occupations: Actress, producer, writer
- Spouse: Jay Cramer (died. 2025)

Katy Sullivan is an American actress, producer, writer, and Paralympic track and field athlete and US record holder.

== Early life ==
Sullivan was born a bilateral transfemoral amputee, missing both lower legs. She grew up in Alabama, pursuing interests in gymnastics, singing and acting, and received a BFA in acting from Webster University's Conservatory in St. Louis.

== Career ==
=== As actor ===
As an actress, she has performed in The Long Red Road at the Goodman Theatre directed by Philip Seymour Hoffman and as the title character in Shakespeare's Richard III with the Chicago Shakespeare Theater in 2024. She has appeared in television shows and independent films including the award-winning documentary Walk On. Sullivan has been seen on NBC's My Name Is Earl, ABC's Last Man Standing with Tim Allen, FX's comedy Legit, CBS' NCIS: New Orleans, and appears as Esther in the 2021 reboot of the Showtime series Dexter.

Sullivan starred as Ani alongside Wendell Pierce in the world premiere of Cost of Living at the Williamstown Theatre Festival. Sullivan reprised the role of Ani in the Manhattan Theatre Club's Pulitzer Prize-winning off-Broadway production of Cost of Living, for which she won a Theatre World Award and was nominated for a Lucille Lortel Award for Outstanding Featured Actress in a Play, Drama League Award for Distinguished Performance, and an Outer Critics Circle Award for Outstanding Actress in a Play. She reprised the role on Broadway in 2022, for which she received a Tony Award nomination. She was the first female amputee to be nominated for a Tony Award, and the first female amputee to perform on Broadway.

She co-created SulliFlinn Productions with fellow Webster Grad, Becca Flinn White. They produce online comedy content, short films and are developing a comedy, Legs, based on their life experiences. They were 2015 fellows at the Producers Guild of America in their Power of Diversity program.

=== As athlete ===
Sullivan is a four-time US champion in the 100 m. She was among the first bilateral above-knee amputees to compete in the Paralympics in ambulatory track when she ran in the London 2012 Paralympic Games, setting a new American record of 17.33 seconds and finishing 6th in the World.

In November 2015, Sullivan received the Athletes in Excellence Award from The Foundation for Global Sports Development, in recognition of her community service efforts and work with youth.
