= Sanford Bookstaver =

American film and television director

- Born: September 1, 1973 (age 53); New York City, New York, U.S.
- Occupations: Film/television director television producer
- Years active: 1999–present
- Spouses: Rena Sofer (m. 2003; div. 2017) (m. 2024)
- Children: 1

Sanford Bookstaver (born September 1, 1973) is an American film & television director and television producer.

== Early life ==
In 1995, Bookstaver graduated from the USC School of Cinema-Television. In 1999, he directed the film Scriptfellas.

== Television ==
As a television director, some of Bookstaver's episodic credits include Prison Break, The O.C., Chicago Fire, Chicago PD, Dawson's Creek, One Tree Hill, House, Harper's Island, Jericho, White Collar, Fastlane and Bones.

== Personal life ==
Bookstaver married actress Rena Sofer in 2003. On August 5, 2005, the couple's first child together was born in Los Angeles. Bookstaver and Sofer eventually divorced in 2017. However, the two soon reconciled, and in April 2019, Sofer announced their engagement. They later remarried in 2024.
