= Remember the Monsters? =

- Dexter episode
- Dexter Morgan (Michael C. Hall) living a new life outside Miami after faking his death.
- Episode no.: Season 8 Episode 12
- Directed by: Steve Shill
- Written by: Scott Buck; Manny Coto
- Cinematography by: Jeffrey Jur
- Editing by: Louis Cioffi; Keith Henderson
- Original release date: September 22, 2013
- Running time: 56 minutes

Guest appearances
- Yvonne Strahovski as Hannah McKay (special guest star); Sean Patrick Flanery as Jacob Elway; Amy Pietz as Dr. Kruper; Eric Ladin as Dr. Turner; Darri Ingólfsson as Oliver Saxon

Episode chronology
← Previous "Monkey in a Box"	Next → —
- Dexter season 8

"Remember the Monsters?" is the series finale of the American crime drama television series Dexter. It is the twelfth episode of the eighth season and the 96th overall episode of the series. The episode was written by executive producers Scott Buck and Manny Coto, and directed by Steve Shill. It originally aired on Showtime on September 22, 2013.

Set in Miami, the series centers on Dexter Morgan, a forensic technician specializing in bloodstain pattern analysis for the fictional Miami Metro Police Department, who leads a secret parallel life as a vigilante serial killer, hunting down murderers who have not been adequately punished by the justice system due to corruption or legal technicalities. Subsequent seasons follow Dexter's journey as he becomes a father, but his relationship with Debra dwindles after she discovers his secret. In the final episode, Dexter searches for Saxon after learning of Debra's shooting, while a hurricane approaches Miami.

According to Nielsen Media Research, the episode was seen by an estimated 2.80 million household viewers and gained a 1.3 ratings share among adults aged 18–49, becoming the most watched episode of the series and the biggest telecast in Showtime's history. The finale received polarizing reviews from critics and audiences; Jennifer Carpenter received high praise for her performance in the episode, but there was criticism towards the writing, unresolved storylines, lack of closure, plot holes, logic, and the episode's final scene. Reception towards the finale grew more negative in subsequent years, with many naming it among the worst series finales of all time.

== Plot ==
Dexter Morgan (Michael C. Hall) arrives at the airport with his son Harrison (Jadon Wells) to leave for Argentina with Hannah McKay (Yvonne Strahovski), who is hiding in the women's bathroom from private detective Jacob Elway (Sean Patrick Flanery). Dexter fills up a backpack with miscellaneous items, places it under a waiting room seat, and tells the flight booker that he saw Elway leave a suspicious backpack under a seat and walk away. She calls airport security, who detain Elway, allowing enough time for Dexter, Harrison, and Hannah to escape. However, they are unable to board the plane, because Dexter's contrived security threat shuts down the terminal.

Debra Morgan (Jennifer Carpenter), shot by serial killer Oliver Saxon (Darri Ingólfsson), is rushed by ambulance to the hospital accompanied by Joey Quinn (Desmond Harrington). She tells Joey she had thought she was going to die and that she would have deserved it. Quinn reassures Deb that she is a good person, and that he believes the good one puts out into the world cancels out the bad. He tells her she will have many opportunities to do good things now that she is a detective again. As they arrive at the hospital and Debra is rushed into emergency surgery, she finally tells a startled Quinn that she loves him.

Against Debra's wishes, Thomas Matthews (Geoff Pierson) calls Dexter to inform him that Debra has been shot. Meanwhile, all flights are grounded due to the oncoming Hurricane Laura, and boats are being moored or put in drydock, thus stranding Dexter, Hannah, and Harrison in Miami. Dexter leaves Harrison with Hannah at a hotel and then goes to see Debra. At the hospital, the doctor (Amy Pietz) informs Dexter that she is optimistic Debra will recover. Debra tells Dexter to go live a happy life, free of guilt.

Meanwhile, Saxon makes his way to the hospital. Dexter confronts him, but before anything can happen, Angel Batista (David Zayas) puts Saxon under arrest. Dexter goes into Debra's room and finds it empty. A shaken Quinn informs Dexter that Deb's condition has worsened. The doctor advises that a blood clot during surgery caused Debra to suffer a stroke, leaving her in a persistent vegetative state. Dexter blames himself and realizes that he destroys everyone he loves, and can never have a happy life.

Hannah and Harrison, meanwhile, sit in a bus heading for Jacksonville. Suddenly, Elway seizes Hannah's arm, telling her that he will turn her in to the Marshal's office at Daytona, the next bus stop. Hannah manages to inject Elway in the thigh with one of Dexter's tranquilizers and escapes with Harrison.

Dexter arrives at the jail and tells the desk clerk he is there to collect gunshot residue from Saxon. Dexter tells Saxon that he is there to kill him with the ballpoint pen he places on the table between them. Seizing the opportunity to kill Dexter, Saxon grabs the pen and attempts to stab his carotid artery, however, Dexter anticipated the attack and dodged it causing Saxon to stab Dexter's shoulder. Dexter then pulls the pen out and plunges it into Saxon's jugular vein, killing him. Dexter claims self-defense, which Batista and Quinn appear to accept, although it is suggested that they know what really happened.

Dexter drives his boat, the Slice of Life, to the hospital. He disconnects Debra's life support systems and, seconds before she dies, whispers "I love you" into her ear. He then places her body on a gurney and, in the chaos of the evacuation, manages to slip unseen with the body onto his boat, docked in the rear of the hospital. Dexter calls a happy Hannah, just as she and Harrison are boarding their flight. Dexter tells Harrison and Hannah he loves them, and then tosses his phone overboard. Dexter then somberly drops Debra's body into the ocean and then drives the boat into the coming storm.

After the storm, Batista receives a call from the Coast Guard, who tell him they have discovered the shattered remnants of Dexter's boat in the ocean and no apparent survivors. The police and media conclude that Dexter died in the wreck. At a cafe in Argentina, Hannah reads an internet article reporting Dexter's supposed death. She silently fights back tears, then puts on a smile and takes Harrison to get some ice cream.

The series' final scene reveals that Dexter is still alive and living under an assumed identity, working for a lumber company in Oregon. He comes home from work to a small, wood-framed house, and sits in the living room, alone, glaring at the camera.

== Production ==
=== Development ===
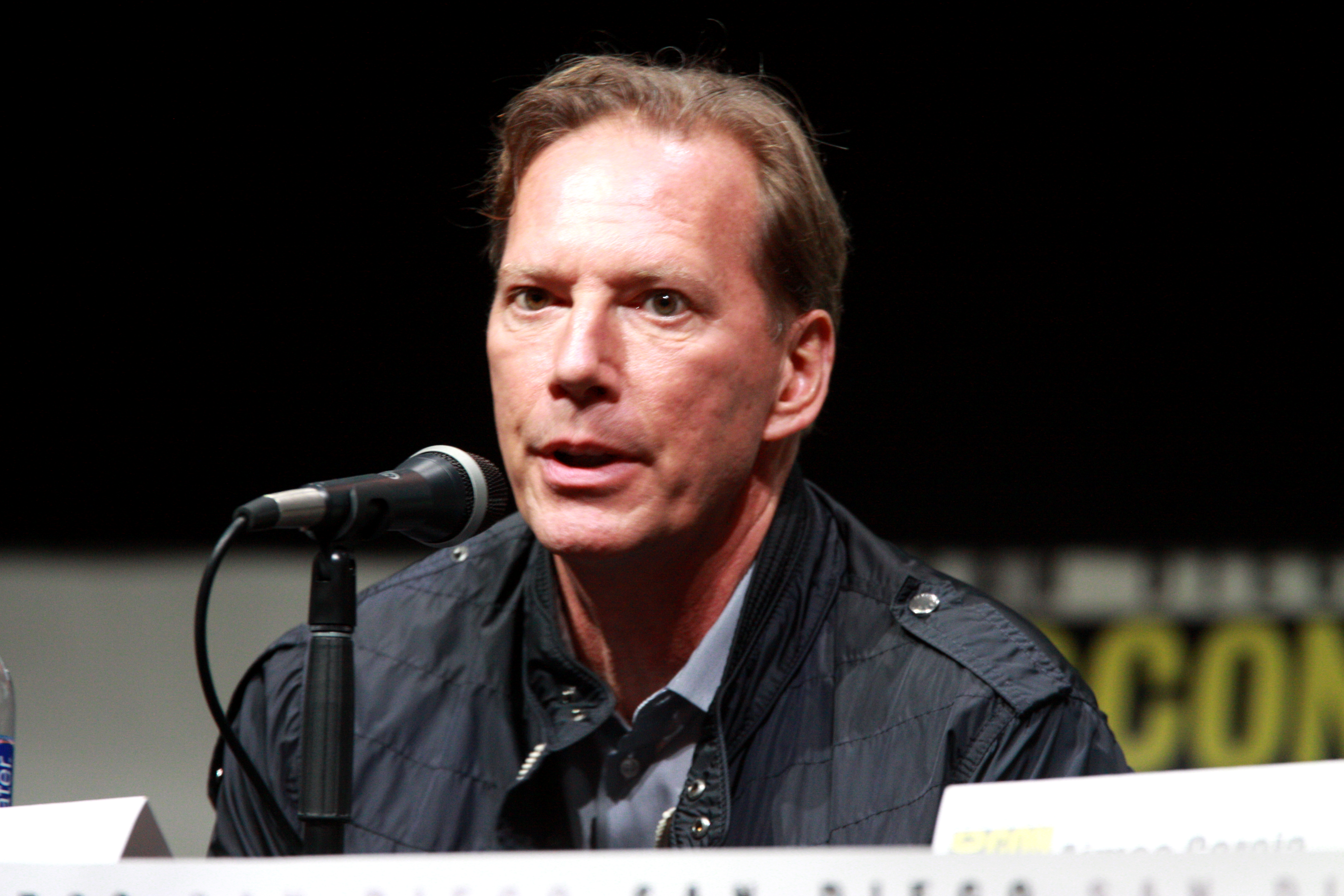
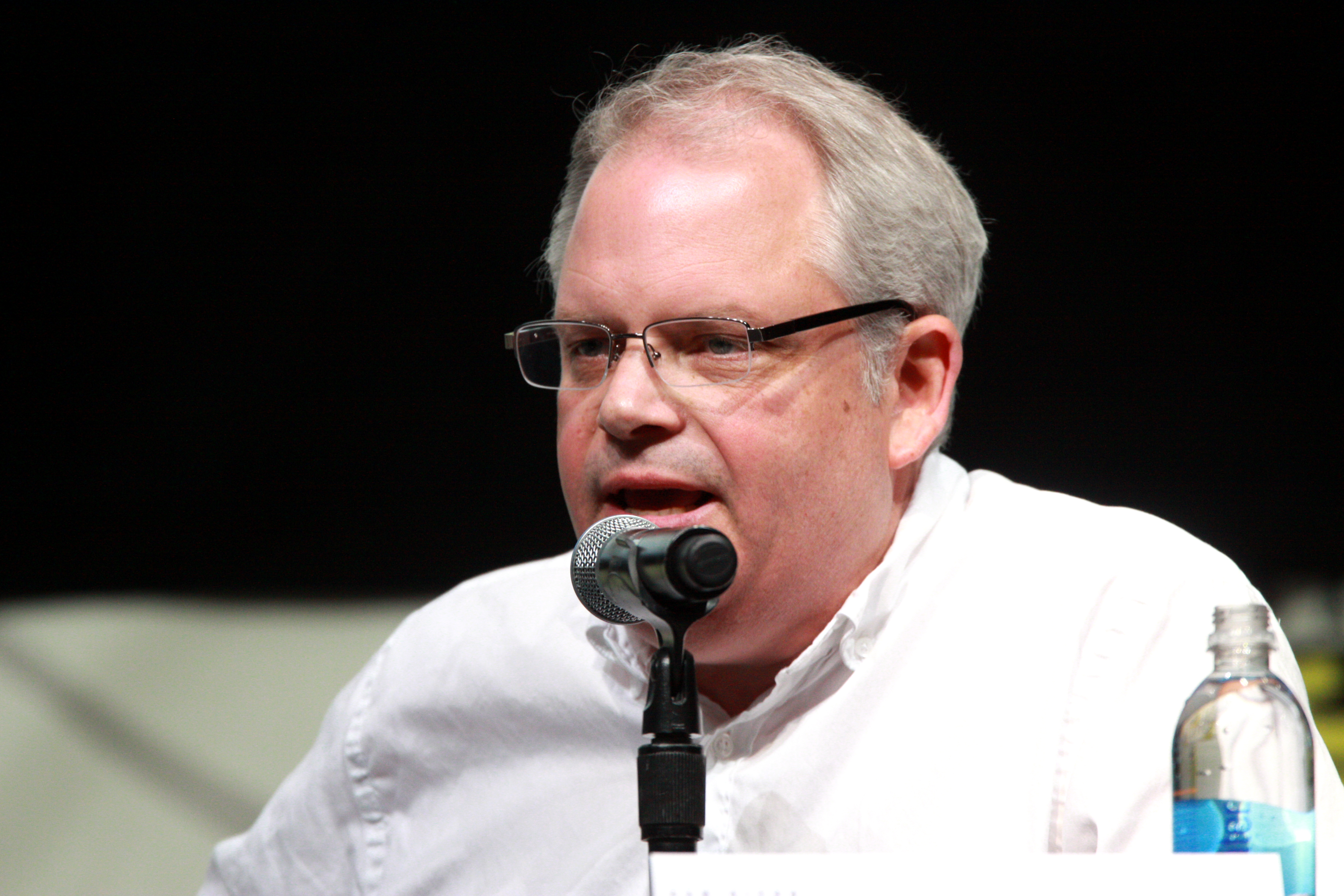
Executive producers Scott Buck and Manny Coto wrote the episode.

In November 2011, Showtime renewed the series for both a seventh and eighth seasons, each consisting of 12 episodes. The following month, Showtime president David Nevins did not confirm the series would end, but explained that the sixth season would "set up a very clear endgame that will take two seasons to tell."

In March 2013, Les Moonves, CEO of CBS Corporation, revealed during a call to investors that the series would end with its eighth season, which was confirmed by Showtime the following month. Showtime Networks chairman and CEO Matthew C. Blank said on a statement, "When it debuted in 2006, Dexter redefined the genre, by taking the anti-hero to new heights and pushing the boundaries of the television landscape. Dexter paved the way for the next generation of award-winning hit Showtime series, and its cultural impact will be felt for years to come."

The episode was written by executive producers Scott Buck and Manny Coto, and directed by Steve Shill. This was Buck's 18th writing credit, Coto's tenth writing credit, and Shill's 13th directing credit.

=== Writing ===
While the writers considered having Miami Metro learn Dexter's secret, they decided against it, as Buck felt it was "off-point." He added, "The story was ultimately about Dexter's personal journey. We have one moment in that interrogation room with Quinn and Batista. Watching the tape, Quinn has known all along that there was more there to Dexter. Batista is seeing a hint of the darker Dexter. There was a hint in that moment. But we didn't want to blow it all up and reveal he's a serial killer." He also explained that as the storyline was already addressed in the second and seventh season, it would feel "repetitious and familiar."

On the decision to have Dexter kill Debra, Buck said, "It always felt important to me that whatever happens to Dexter, the end of the series wasn't about something that's happening to him but rather that it's his decision. He has decided the fate of so many other people, but now it's up to him to have to decide his own fate. His decision is to remove himself from the thing he's always wanted the most — which is to be connected to humanity — and to live in this self-imposed prison in the land of the serial killers: the Pacific Northwest. He also couldn't allow her to live under those circumstances. There's no hope of recovery for her and he knows she wouldn't want to go on this way. Dexter has killed so many people so easily throughout his whole life — and it's the easiest thing in the world for him — but to have to end his sister's life is the most difficult thing he has ever had to do." Sara Colleton mentioned that the writers were planning Debra to die since they started mapping the seventh and eighth season. Jennifer Carpenter said, "I'm not sure a happy ending was possible for her. This was her happy ending."

For the final scene, Buck had a clear idea on how the scene of the episode would go for years, feeling that it was the ending that was the "most justified." He explained, "For us, that's the tragedy. The one thing we felt Dexter wanted more than anything was human connections. Even in the first season we see him trying to get with Rudy. Now that he's finally made that journey and he's almost poised to have a real human life, he has to give all that up to save Harrison and Hannah." When questioned over the meaning of the final scene, Dexter's stare, Buck wanted to leave it for the audience to decide, only saying "he's dealing with the reality of the misery of his life in that moment."

A few weeks after the episode aired, executive producer John Goldwyn mentioned that Showtime did not want Dexter to die in the episode, "When we told them the arc for the last season, they just said, 'Just to be clear, he's going to live.' There were a lot of endings discussed because it was a very interesting problem to solve, to bring it to a close. People have a relationship with Dexter, even if it doesn't have the size and the ferocity of the fan base for Breaking Bad. But it has a very core loyal following." However, Showtime president David Nevins denied the claim, arguing that "the people who are really in the center — Michael, Scott Buck, Sara Colleton — no one even brought up the idea. It was never discussed."

== Reception ==
=== Viewers ===
In its original American broadcast, "Remember the Monsters?" was seen by an estimated 2.80 million household viewers with a 1.3 in the 18–49 demographics. This means that 1.3 percent of all households with televisions watched the episode. This was a 16% increase in viewership from the previous episode, which was watched by an estimated 2.40 million household viewers with a 1.0 in the 18–49 demographics.

=== Critical reviews ===
==== Contemporary reviews ====
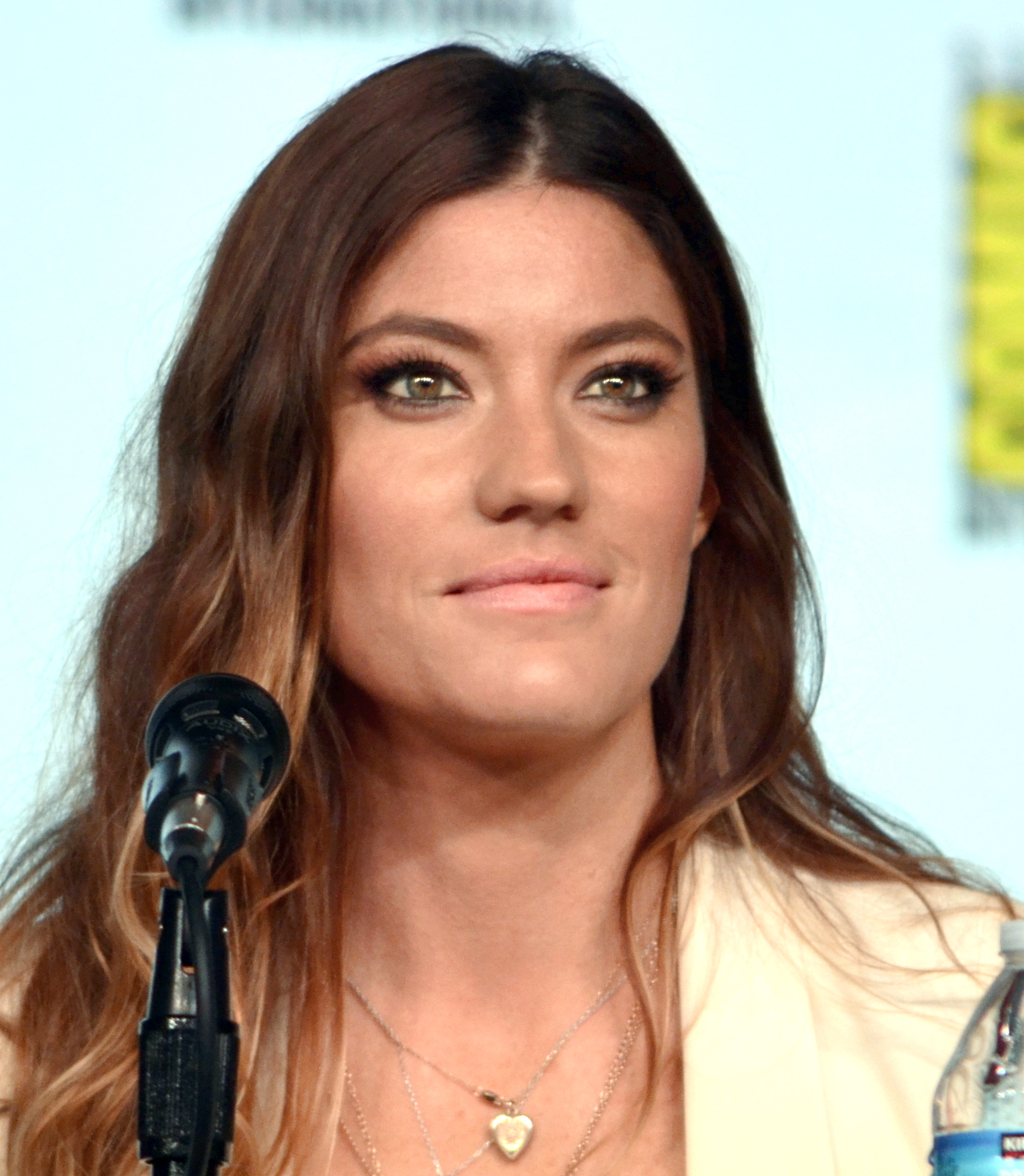
While the finale polarized critics and audiences, Jennifer Carpenter's performance in the episode received high praise.

"Remember the Monsters?" received polarizing reviews from critics. Joshua Alston of The A.V. Club gave the episode an "F" grade and wrote, "It's a feat for a finale to make you regret having watched a single moment of the series, but "Remember The Monsters" made it look easy. The first and second seasons of Dexter were enjoyable, sure, but they also lined up the first dominoes in a chain of contrivances that allowed Dexter to skirt apprehension and win new allies rather than be made to deal with the consequences of his actions. There was a time when I'd have recommended those seasons, but now I couldn't even do that in good conscience, knowing they could be the gateway drug to subsequent seasons."

Alan Sepinwall of HitFix wrote, "Would I have preferred for Dexter to close out its run with Dexter's identity exposed and/or with the show admitting that we've been rooting for a villain (albeit someone dealing with even worse villains) all these years? Probably. But at this point I would have settled for anything dramatically interesting on any level. And in addition to having a fundamentally different philosophy about the show and their hero and his show, the Dexter writers seemed to be phoning in this entire final season. Is this an ending that will satisfy anyone?" Richard Rys of Vulture gave the episode a 2 star rating out of 5 and wrote, "This season started off strong, then took a turn for the worse. Still, I was optimistic that this final hour would be a redemption of sorts, a fitting end to the story of Dexter Morgan and his sister. As the closing scene faded from my television screen, my reaction wasn't shock or sadness. It was anger."

Nick Harley of Variety wrote, "Dexter had been running on creative fumes the past few seasons, and Sunday night's series finale — despite its emotional flourishes — merely underscored that this was a series well past its expiration date. Some of the sloppiness in the finish was perhaps the biggest surprise, given how meticulous its serial-killer leading man usually is." Richard Lawson of The Atlantic wrote, "Dexter was plenty entertaining at its peak, a suspenseful and intricate thriller that rewarded loyal viewing with frequent callbacks and recurring characters, but as a show about one man's grand and elaborate lie, it needed to nail the landing in order to really succeed. And it tumbled hard. And thus the whole thing was for naught. Turns out, the show's final victim was itself."

Kevin Fitzpatrick of ScreenCrush wrote, "Sigh. We hadn't expected an overabundance of satisfactory closure in bringing Dexter to an ultimate end, but we hadn't expected such a needlessly damning final sequence either. Goodnight, Dexter. May our rage with your final hours subside, at least until the spinoff announcement." Nick Harley of Den of Geek gave the episode a 1 star rating out of 5 and wrote, "I would have rather the whole thing take place inside of a snow globe. Dexter ended its eighth and final season tonight in stunningly horrid fashion. The whole season was a lackluster mess, devoid of compelling storylines or really any reason to warrant its existence. Tonight it limped across the finish line weighed down by many of the problems it showcased this season; laughable writing, poor characterization, and unbelievably bad plotting. Tonight the series didn't conclude so much as it just shrugged and kind of gave up."

Andrea Reiher of Zap2it wrote, "The finale was not without its faults. There were some enormous plot holes, such as how did the hospital just let him walk off with Deb's body and did no one miss her after the storm passed? And how, exactly, did Dexter survive driving his boat into a hurricane? But the final episode got the big strokes right - a darkness that the show needed for its ending." Alan Danzis of BuddyTV wrote, "The Dexter series finale is many things at many different times. It's often boring, it's often predictable and it often seems like the "right" ending. So overall, it's an okay finish to a horrible season of a show that should have ended a long, long time ago."

Alex Moaba of HuffPost wrote, "Dexter deserved better. So did Dexter fans, who, witnessing this Showtime drama end in a heap, were subjected to the lamest series finale since Seinfeld." Television Without Pity gave the episode an "F" grade and wrote, "Wow. What an utter train wreck. I've watched worse hours of television, but I'm not sure I've seen a series finale that had such little idea what it was doing before."

Not all reviews were negative. Matt Fowler of IGN gave the episode a "good" 7.6 out of 10, and wrote, "So I'll say this. Dexter did pretty well with the finale. I liked how morose it got and applauded the fact that Dexter finally learned what an unintentional destroyer of worlds he was. Enough to make him want to end it all. Of course, he didn't end it all and there's an even bigger tragedy in that, but that shouldn't completely muck up the fact that he finally had a moment of clarity." Nevertheless, he gave the season a "mediocre" 5.5 out of 10 rating and wrote, "I still feel the Dexter/Deb antagonism within the first four episodes, culminating with the car crash in the season's strongest episode, "Scar Tissue," was really good. And most definitely an avenue that should have worked to inform the season more than it did (it essentially lasted only those four episodes). What happened after the crash into the lake though, with Dexter and Deb re-discovering their familial bond, was tragically boring, shoddy and unbecoming of something that we all hoped would be a riveting final run."

James Hibberd of Entertainment Weekly called it "the best Dexter episode in years. [...] It was also one of the strangest episodes in the show's history [...] It's like watching a different series, one that was more compelling than the show it served to close." Miranda Wicker of TV Fanatic gave the episode a 4.5 star rating out of 5 and wrote, "After a rather lackluster final season, "Remember the Monsters" (mostly) delivered."

Mary McNamara of the Los Angeles Times praised Carpenter's performance as worthy of an Emmy nomination and argued that "the parting scenes between Dexter and Deb, possibly the most powerful sibling bond television has ever seen, gave the show the send-off it deserved". Mike Hale of The New York Times called it one of the "saddest endings you'll ever see on a primetime tv show", stated that he "bought the ending", and observed that fans "may or may not think that Dexter's final resting place is the one he deserves. But it works".

==== Retrospective reviews ====
Reception for the finale grew more negative in subsequent years. Chris E. Hayner of Zap2it named it the sixth worst series finale, calling it "layer after layer of bizarre", and "it's like the finale was written using Mad Libs." In May 2015, Rolling Stone included it among the worst series finales, writing, "The result of a narrative logjam set in place by network executives who ordered the producers not to kill their main character in his own series finale, it left many viewers wishing they'd logged off." Danny Walker of Daily Mirror and Leigh Blickley of The Huffington Post both named the episode as one of the seven worst TV series finales, with Blickley stating that the episode "was farfetched and lacked that Dexter-feel fellow fans craved."

Kelly Lawler of USA Today named it as one of the top five worst series finales. In 2022, Wilson Chapman of Variety named it one of the worst series finales, noting that the episode was "so poorly received that its final scene, which sees Miami's most prolific killer hiding out in a new life as a lumberjack in Oregon, became an instant meme and a catch-all term for shows that royally screwed the landing." In 2023, The A.V. Club named it as the worst series finale ever, writing "it would've been nearly impossible to brace for just how badly "Remember The Monsters?" botched the landing." In 2024, TVLine named it the worst series finale of all time, arguing that "it slayed us in the absolute worst way imaginable." That same year, Ben Rosenstock of TIME called it one of the most controversial finales of all time, referring to it as "a finale so powerful in its badness that you'll never look at the word "lumberjack" the same way again."

In May 2019, a poll for E! states that 66.88% of the audience disliked the finale, while the remaining 33.12% liked it, ranking it as the third worst series finale of all time. In 2021, respondents to a survey conducted by the website OnBuy.com named it as one of the most disappointing series finales ever.

=== Response from cast and executives ===
Before the episode aired, executive producer and showrunner Scott Buck said, "even if I don't write an episode, I'm still in charge. I take full responsibility. We all work cohesively as a team. If people think the final episode stood out, it's probably because it's been sitting in my mind for so long. Buck also mentioned that there was pressure in filming both the seventh and eighth season back to back, "normally what happens is you take a longer break and come in filled with ideas. We did absolutely the best we could." Executive producer Sara Colleton anticipated polarizing reactions, but defended their choices, "there will be people who hate it, but we can't try to anticipate that or put it through the lens of any other show's finale — because that was another show. This is our show. This is Dexter. [...] At the end of the day, we would rather go down with what we feel is right than try to figure out how to make everybody happy. We feel that we've pulled off what we wanted, and that is what we needed to feel."

Michael C. Hall said that "let's be real: people found the way that show left things pretty unsatisfying, and there's always been a hope that a story would emerge that would be worth telling. I include myself in the group of people that wondered, "What the hell happened to that guy?" He explained that he understood the audience's reaction, "I certainly thought it was justifiable for Dexter to do what he did. I think some of the criticisms were about that, and some of the criticisms weren't so much about the "what" as they were about the "how," and those were valid too." Hall also said that "I think the ending was 'mystifying' at best to people. 'Confounding', 'exasperating', 'frustrating' — on down the line of negative adjectives", and that it was a big factor in choosing to star in the limited series Dexter: New Blood.

Showtime president David Nevins praised the series finale against fan backlash, saying: "The fundamental design of where they ended Dexter was really well-conceived. He had to sacrifice the one person who was closest to him in the world, and he had to leave. That was where it was headed for a very long time." Nevins also said there were never any discussions to kill off Dexter, and they did not just keep the character alive for a potential spinoff series.
