= Bullseye (American Horror Story) =

- American Horror Story episode
- Episode no.: Season 4 Episode 6
- Directed by: Howard Deutch
- Written by: John J. Gray
- Production code: 4ATS06
- Original air date: November 12, 2014
- Running time: 50 minutes

Guest appearances
- Grace Gummer as Penny; Lee Tergesen as Vince; Naomi Grossman as Pepper

Episode chronology
← Previous "Pink Cupcakes"	Next → "Test of Strength"
- American Horror Story: Freak Show

"Bullseye" is the sixth episode of the fourth season of the anthology television series American Horror Story, which premiered on November 12, 2014, on the cable network FX. It was written by John J. Gray and directed by Howard Deutch. In this episode, Elsa (Jessica Lange) prepares to work in television by starting a new act and the sisters settle in their new home.

== Plot ==
Elsa brings out an old spinning wheel and begins throwing daggers at it to prepare for her upcoming TV show. The night of her birthday party, she learns of the troupe's suspicions of her involvement with Bette and Dot's disappearance. Elsa reminds them that none of them would be here without her, and they should be grateful for her saving them. To prove their loyalty, Elsa demands that one of them be strapped to the wheel while she does her routine. Paul reluctantly volunteers, and Elsa purposefully hits him in the gut and refuses to call a doctor.

Dandy declares his love for the twins and wants to marry them. Dot learns of a pair of conjoined twins that have been separated for the first time and thinks Dandy could pay for the surgery.

Stanley pressures Maggie into leading Jimmy to a barn and killing him. However, she suggests Ma Petite instead, but she can't go through with it. She begs Jimmy to leave town with her immediately, but Stanley confronts her angrily, telling her they need the hands of Jimmy no matter what. Jimmy goes to Dandy's house to see if what Paul said was true. Meanwhile, Ethel brings Elsa a piece of the cake she made her for her birthday, explaining that it is bad luck for her not to have some of her own cake. Elsa confides in Ethel that she believes her parents had her only to fill the loss of her older sister but that she only reminded them of the loss. Elsa confesses that she had to make her own family because of it and that she is the sister she was never able to meet. However, Ethel responds by ominously warning Elsa that if she finds out that she is lying and did wrong by the twins she will kill her with her own hands. Ethel then tells her to make a wish, of which she does wishing to be loved before blowing out the candle.

== Reception ==
=== Ratings ===
"Bullseye" was watched by 3.65 million viewers and was the highest rated cable broadcast of the night. The episode received a 1.8 ratings share among adults 18–49, down 0.3 from the previous week's episode.

=== Reviews ===
The episode received mixed to positive reviews from television critics. On review aggregator website Rotten Tomatoes, the episode has an approval rating of 54% based on 13 reviews. The critical consensus reads: "Though the various subplots are growing too abundant, the progressive unraveling of each characters' sanity in "Bullseye" still thrills."

Matt Fowler of IGN wrote: ""Bullseye" wasn't bad at all, but it was sort of a flatliner when it came to providing thrills. The spinning wheel bit made for an interesting gambit, but it still seemed like it could have gone further. And while I like the prospect of Dot and Bette trying to separate themselves, their arc this week with Dandy felt a lot like filler. We'll have to see how everything shakes out with Dandy and Jimmy's pow wow." Erik Adams of The A.V. Club gave the episode an A− rating, writing: "When "Bullseye" drops a chainsaw, it loses a pinky toe at most. This is the episode that's been waiting to fight its way out of Freak Show all along, catalyzing the season's potential energy into the genuine spectacle of histrionic freakouts and hypnogogic fantasy."
