= Orphans (American Horror Story) =

- American Horror Story episode
- Episode no.: Season 4 Episode 10
- Directed by: Bradley Buecker
- Written by: James Wong
- Production code: 4ATS10
- Original air date: December 17, 2014
- Running time: 53 minutes

Guest appearances
- Lily Rabe as Sister Mary Eunice McKee; Celia Weston as Lillian Hemmings; Malcolm-Jamal Warner as Angus T. Jefferson; Naomi Grossman as Pepper; Matthew Glave as Larry Gayheart; Mare Winningham as Rita Gayheart

Episode chronology
← Previous "Tupperware Party Massacre"	Next → "Magical Thinking"
- American Horror Story: Freak Show

"Orphans" is the tenth episode of the fourth season of the anthology television series American Horror Story, which premiered on December 17, 2014, on the cable network FX. It was written by James Wong and directed by Bradley Buecker.

Although American Horror Story is categorized as an anthology series, the episode is notable for being the first in the series to directly tie two seasons together, acknowledging that both plot lines and series of events exist within the same universe. In the episode's finale, Pepper (Naomi Grossman) is institutionalised in Briarcliff Manor, the main location of American Horror Story: Asylum (in which she also appears) and is shown meeting Sister Mary Eunice McKee (Lily Rabe) two years before the events of Asylum take place.

== Plot ==
Pepper's life is shattered when she finds that her husband, Salty, has died in his sleep.

Elsa reveals to Desiree that she began her troupe after noticing the freaks were not being treated as they should be. Elsa found Pepper at an orphanage and recruited Ma Petite to act as Pepper's child and later found Salty. Desiree suggests returning Pepper to her elder sister.

Stanley convinces Elsa to let him take care of Salty's body after telling her he would have the pinhead cremated, but he chops off the head and sells it to the Museum of Morbid Curiosities. Maggie confesses to Desiree that she and Stanley are con artists. The two visit the museum and are shocked to find Ma Petite's body, Salty's severed head, and Jimmy's hands on display. Elsa tracks down Pepper's sister, Rita, and convinces her to take in Pepper.

Nine years later, Rita gives birth to a deformed baby, and her husband convinces her to frame Pepper for the baby's murder. After committing Pepper to Briarcliff, Sister Mary Eunice has Pepper assist her in the library sorting magazines. While doing so, Pepper finds a magazine with Elsa on the cover.

== Reception ==
=== Reviews ===
On review aggregator website Rotten Tomatoes, the episode has an approval rating of 85% based on 13 reviews. The critical consensus reads: "A deeper look into the sad story of Pepper makes "Orphans" one of the more heartfelt episodes of Freak Show."

Emily L. Stephens of The A.V. Club praised Naomi Grossman's "almost wordless" performance as Pepper, opining that it "strikes a ringing note of feeling".

=== Ratings ===
The episode was watched by 2.99 million viewers during its original broadcast, making it the highest rated cable program of the day although a minor dip from the 3.07 million viewers the previous episode totalled.
