= Edward Mordrake (American Horror Story) =

- American Horror Story episodes
- Episode nos.: Season 4 Episodes 3 & 4
- Directed by: Michael Uppendahl (Part 1); Howard Deutch (Part 2)
- Written by: James Wong (Part 1); Jennifer Salt (Part 2)
- Production codes: 4ATS03 (Part 1); 4ATS04 (Part 2)
- Original air dates: October 22, 2014 (Part 1); October 29, 2014 (Part 2)
- Running time: 57 minutes (Part 1); 45 minutes (Part 2)

Guest appearances
- Wes Bentley as Edward Mordrake; Celia Weston as Lillian Hemmings (Part 1); John Carroll Lynch as Twisty the Clown; Skyler Samuels as Bonnie Lipton; Naomi Grossman as Pepper; Patti LaBelle as Dora

Episode chronology
← Previous "Massacres and Matinees"	Next → "Pink Cupcakes"
- American Horror Story: Freak Show

"Edward Mordrake" is a two-part episode, consisting of the third and fourth episodes of the fourth season of the anthology television series American Horror Story. The first part aired on October 22, 2014, and the second on October 29, 2014, on the cable network FX. The first part was written by James Wong and directed by Michael Uppendahl and the second part was written by Jennifer Salt and directed by Howard Deutch.

The episode's first part introduces the main characters of Stanley (Denis O'Hare) and Maggie Esmerelda (Emma Roberts), it also stars Wes Bentley as the title character of the episode. The second part of the episode deals with the backstories of several characters including Twisty the Clown (John Carroll Lynch).

== Plot ==
Ethel visits Dr. Myron Bonham, who diagnoses her with cirrhosis of the liver. Her prognosis is dire: six months to a year.

Back at the freak show, the carnies explain that they will not be performing on Halloween by telling the twins about the legend of Edward Mordrake: a noble Englishman with a second, whispering face on the back of his head. His failed attempts to kill the face drove him insane, and his family sent him to Bethlem Royal Hospital. The legend says that if they perform on Halloween, he will appear and take a soul.

At Mott Manor, Dandy gets upset after Gloria gives him a Howdy Doody costume. Dandy decides to craft the pieces into a Twisty the Clown costume.

A woman named Maggie Esmeralda arrives and joins the freak show, claiming to be a fortune teller in need of a job. In reality, she is a con woman looking to buy freaks for a museum.

In the trailer, Dell pumps iron while Desiree unsuccessfully tries to get his libido going. Ethel reveals to Dell that she is dying. She asks Dell to guide and take care of Jimmy, who is Dell's unacknowledged son.

Bette and Dot go to rehearse, unafraid of the Mordrake legend. As they rehearse, Edward Mordrake emerges in a green mist on the freak show grounds and enters the tent to watch Elsa. Mordrake continues to seek a "pure freak" for his spirit troupe. He visits Ethel, Suzi, Paul, and Elsa, who tell their respective stories. Mordrake's other face whispers that Elsa is "the one", and he prepares to kill her, but stops as he hears music.

Jimmy and Maggie stumble across Twisty's trailer. After freeing the children and phoning the police, Maggie hides as Twisty tries to murder Jimmy. Mordrake finds Twisty and listens to his backstory. Mordrake, seeing the pain and grief Twisty has suffered, kills Twisty and adopts him into his spiritual troupe.

A distraught Dandy takes Twisty's mask and returns home, where he murders Dora. As the town learns that Twisty is dead, the curfew is lifted and many residents of the town visit the freak show to thank Jimmy. Elsa announces her grand premiere to the town, and tickets sell out. Esmeralda's partner Stanley arrives at the freakshow, where he poses as a Hollywood agent.

== Reception ==
=== Reviews ===
"Edward Mordrake" received positive reviews from critics. On review aggregator website Rotten Tomatoes, both Part I and Part II each have an approval rating of 75% based on 12 reviews. Part I's critical consensus reads: "Though stagnant at times, "Edward Mordrake, Pt. 1" gets into the Halloween spirit introducing new characters including the first supernatural element of the season." Part II's critical consensus reads: ""Edward Mordrake Pt. 2" was a nice change-up from the first three episodes, giving more reasons to care about Freak Show's characters." Reviewers praised Elsa and Twisty's backstories and particularly John Carroll Lynch's performance.

Erik Adams of The A.V. Club gave the first part a B− rating, writing: "The love of a good shock often stands in for American Horror Story's inability to scare: It's much easier to fleetingly startle than suggest that any of the primary characters are in mortal danger. 'Edward Mordrake (Part 1)' reinforces that difficulty... Freak Show is succeeding at making us care for these people; if only it could make us fear for them as well." He gave the second part a C+ rating, criticising the idea to make Twisty the Clown into an origin story for Dandy, however he did praise the acting, particularly Finn Wittrock's. Matt Fowler of IGN gave "Edward Mordrake (Part 2)" a positive review, writing: "Freak Show, by dropping a few characters (like Dot/Bette, Dell, and Ethel), losing the obligatory song, and tightening its belt, got good this week. Mordrake wasn't frightening but the backstories he brought out of both Elsa and Twisty were haunting and ghoulish."

=== Ratings ===
"Edward Mordrake (Part 1)" was watched by 4.44 million viewers and was the highest rated cable broadcast of the night. The episode received a 2.2 ratings share among adults 18–49, down 0.1 from the previous week's episode. "Edward Mordrake (Part 2)" was watched by 4.51 million viewers, a slight increase from the first part. Like the previous half, the episode was also the highest rated cable program for the night, with a 2.3 ratings share among adults 18–49.
