= Test of Strength =

- American Horror Story episode
- Episode no.: Season 4 Episode 7
- Directed by: Anthony Hemingway
- Written by: Crystal Liu
- Production code: 4ATS07
- Original air date: November 19, 2014
- Running time: 46 minutes

Guest appearances
- Celia Weston as Lillian Hemmings; Grace Gummer as Penny; Lee Tergesen as Vince; Naomi Grossman as Pepper

Episode chronology
← Previous "Bullseye"	Next → "Blood Bath"
- American Horror Story: Freak Show

"Test of Strength" is the seventh episode of the fourth season of the anthology television series American Horror Story, which premiered on November 19, 2014, on the cable television network FX. It was written by Crystal Liu, directed by Anthony Hemingway and focuses on the camp girls planning revenge on Dell (Michael Chiklis).

== Plot ==
The twins leave Dandy after Dot learns that he read her diary, and Dandy becomes furious.

Upon returning to the freak show, Jimmy confronts Elsa for selling the twins. Still, they tell Jimmy he misunderstood and lie for Elsa, eventually blackmailing her for 50% of the box office returns in the process.

After caring for Paul, Penny returns home to tell her father that she is moving out, but he knocks her out and has his "artist friend" tattoo her face and head and give her a forked tongue.

Stanley sees Dell at the gay bar and threatens to out him unless he delivers him the body of a freak. While trying to kill Amazon Eve, Dell underestimates her size and strength and is beaten up by her. Jimmy later tells Dell that he knows Dell is his father, and they bond. Later that night, Dell sneaks into Ma Petite's tent and brings her a pretty dress. She tries it on, and he hugs her until he crushes her, breaking her spine in the process. He delivers the body to Stanley, who sells it to the Museum of Morbid Curiosities, where Ma Petite's body is shown on exhibition.

== Reception ==
=== Reviews ===
On review aggregator website Rotten Tomatoes, the episode has an approval rating of 46% based on 13 reviews. The critical consensus reads: "While the season's suspense is building nicely, "Test of Strength" is basically a filler episode that does nothing more than tease future tragedy."

Erik Adams of The A.V. Club gave the episode a C rating, writing: "It's sloppy, but that's to be expected from an episode of American Horror Story that tosses seven or eight of its proverbial chainsaws into the air without any noticeable concern for juggling them. Not to mention the rendition of a Nirvana song that would be written roughly forty years after the episode takes place. What really irks me about "Test Of Strength" is how it left me feeling: Numb." Matt Fowler of IGN wrote: "Test of Strength" may have mostly been power plays and backstabbing, but it was tight, focused and really helped Dell feel like a more present character... Of course, part of me is crediting this episode for feeling "tight" just because it came in at a normal episode length and not one of FX's new-fangled hour and twenty minute dawdle-fests. This wasn't a scary episode, as not much directly involving the carnival is, but it was effective."

=== Ratings ===
"Test of Strength" was watched by 3.91 million viewers and was the highest rated cable broadcast of the night. The episode received a 2.0 ratings share among adults 18–49, up 0.2 from the previous week's episode.
