= Pink Cupcakes =

- American Horror Story episode
- Episode no.: Season 4 Episode 5
- Directed by: Michael Uppendahl
- Written by: Jessica Sharzer
- Production code: 4ATS05
- Original air date: November 5, 2014
- Running time: 47 minutes

Guest appearances
- Gabourey Sidibe as Regina Ross; Matt Bomer as Andy Stiles; Celia Weston as Lillian Hemmings; Naomi Grossman as Pepper; Patti LaBelle as Dora Brown

Episode chronology
← Previous "Edward Mordrake"	Next → "Bullseye"
- American Horror Story: Freak Show

"Pink Cupcakes" is the fifth episode of the fourth season of the anthology television series American Horror Story, which premiered on November 5, 2014, on the cable network FX. It was written by Jessica Sharzer and directed by Michael Uppendahl. In this episode, Stanley (Denis O'Hare) and Elsa (Jessica Lange) have their own ideas on getting rid of Bette and Dot (Sarah Paulson) as Dandy (Finn Wittrock) finds his first victim.

== Plot ==
Stanley introduces himself to Elsa as a WBN television agent, offering to give her a show of her own. Elsa turns down his offer when she finds out that it is television.

Jimmy arrives at Dell's trailer to retrieve him as Ethel asked, but he instead finds Desiree. The two bond and nearly have sex before Desiree tells Jimmy she is intersex.

Stanley has a fantasy about killing the twins with poisoned pink cupcakes and presenting them to the museum, but in reality Dot refuses cupcakes for both of them because they needed to keep their figure.

Dandy finds his way into a gay bar, where he finds Dell having a drink with a male prostitute named Andy. Dandy leads Andy into the bus by paying him $100, but insists he is not gay. Dandy offers that they strip naked facing away from each other. When Andy turns around, Dandy stabs him, and begins to dismember him, disposing of his limbs in a tub of acid.

Regina Ross, Dora's daughter, calls from the Barbizon after her mother missed their weekly phone call. Gloria initially puts her off, saying that Dora is too busy to call. As they are about to hang up, Gloria recalls that Regina used to live with them and played with Dandy, and asks what she thought about Gloria as a mother. Regina recalls that Gloria was never really there as a mother, and Gloria defends herself, saying she raised Dandy how she was raised growing up.

Elsa drives away from Jupiter with the twins under the pretense of taking them to get new outfits, but instead takes them to Mott Manor. She offers them to Gloria, who previously offered to buy them to please Dandy.

== Reception ==
=== Reviews ===
The episode received positive reviews from critics. On review aggregator website Rotten Tomatoes, the episode has an approval rating of 79% based on 14 reviews. The critical consensus reads: ""Pink Cupcakes" provides essential character developments, the first time for many, while also fulfilling the gore quota."

Matt Fowler from IGN wrote: "[The episode] played fast and loose with show reality this week by giving us a horrific death that was immediately recalled. Sort of an empty fake out, really. But that didn't stop the rest of the episode from raising the stakes of the series – from Elsa's new malicious form of "mentoring" Bette and Dot, to Dell's secret homosexual life, to Dandy's new determination to be a pristine killing machine." Emily L. Stephens of The A.V. Club gave "Pink Cupcakes" a B rating, writing: "Everyone in the orbit of Fräulein Elsa's Cabinet of Curiosities sustains themselves on a fantasy, and in tonight's episode, everyone settles for less than they want, and sometimes less than they need."

=== Ratings ===
"Pink Cupcakes" was watched by 4.22 million viewers and was the highest rated cable broadcast of the night. The episode received a 2.1 ratings share among adults 18–49, down 0.1 from the previous week's episode.
