= Massacres and Matinees =

- American Horror Story episode
- Episode no.: Season 4 Episode 2
- Directed by: Alfonso Gomez-Rejon
- Written by: Tim Minear
- Production code: 4ATS02
- Original air date: October 15, 2014
- Running time: 55 minutes

Guest appearances
- John Carroll Lynch as Twisty the Clown; Skyler Samuels as Bonnie Lipton; Naomi Grossman as Pepper; Patti LaBelle as Dora

Episode chronology
← Previous "Monsters Among Us"	Next → "Edward Mordrake"
- American Horror Story: Freak Show

"Massacres and Matinees" is the second episode of the fourth season of the anthology television series American Horror Story, which premiered on October 15, 2014, on the cable network FX. In this episode, a curfew is placed on Jupiter, as the police investigate the freak show when they suspect that a police officer was murdered on the premises. It was written by Tim Minear and directed by Alfonso Gomez-Rejon.

== Plot ==
The police arrive at the freak show to investigate the detective's disappearance and inform Elsa that a curfew is now in place in Jupiter following the string of murders. Meanwhile, the carnival strong man Dell Toledo, Jimmy's father, and his three-breasted hermaphrodite wife Desiree arrive and ask Elsa for a job. Elsa makes Dell head of security but soon realizes her mistake after Dell schedules a matinee against Elsa's orders, attacks Jimmy, and frames another performer, Meep, for the murder of the detective after Jimmy tried to frame Dell. Meep is arrested by the police and murdered by inmates in jail. His body is returned to the freak show, where the fellow freaks gather around and mourn.

Dandy asks Jimmy if he can join the freak show, as he dreams of being on stage, but after Dandy accidentally insults Jimmy, he is rebuffed and sent away. After falling into a fit of rage, Dandy returns home to find that his mother, Gloria, has hired Twisty the Clown to cheer him up. However, Twisty storms off after Dandy tries to look inside his clown bag. Dandy follows Twisty back to his trailer where the two children Twisty is holding hostage attempt an escape but are recaptured by Twisty and Dandy.

== Reception ==
=== Reviews ===
"Massacres and Matinees" has received positive reviews from critics. On review aggregator website Rotten Tomatoes, the episode has an approval rating of 85% based on 13 reviews. The critical consensus reads: "The dark themes of "Massacres and Matinees" are reminiscent of themes of season two, only more vibrant this time around."

Erik Adams of The A.V. Club gave the episode a B rating, stating: "Following the dull, clean monochrome of Coven, the popping colors and three-ring grime of Freak Show is refreshing." Matt Fowler of IGN gave the episode a rating of 8.0/10, writing: "The clown is still ghastly, Dandy is still spoiled and sinister, and the introduction of Dell now brings a new carny power struggle to the show. All steps in the right direction." Numerous other critics praised the introduction of Michael Chiklis and Angela Bassett's characters, as well as the Clown's and Dandy's storylines.

=== Ratings ===
"Massacres and Matinees" was watched by 4.53 million viewers with a 2.3 18–49 ratings share, down 0.8 from the previous episode. It was the highest rated cable show of the night.

=== See also ===
Humbug - an X-Files episode investigating murders at a Freak Show.
