= Blood Bath (American Horror Story) =

- American Horror Story episode
- Episode no.: Season 4 Episode 8
- Directed by: Bradley Buecker
- Written by: Ryan Murphy
- Production code: 4ATS08
- Original air date: December 3, 2014
- Running time: 45 minutes

Guest appearances
- Danny Huston as Massimo Dolcefino; Gabourey Sidibe as Regina Ross; Grace Gummer as Penny; Lee Tergesen as Vince; Naomi Grossman as Pepper; Chrissy Metz as Barbara

Episode chronology
← Previous "Test of Strength"	Next → "Tupperware Party Massacre"
- American Horror Story: Freak Show

"Blood Bath" is the eighth episode of the fourth season of the anthology television series American Horror Story, which premiered on December 3, 2014, on the cable network FX. It was written by Ryan Murphy and directed by Bradley Buecker. In this episode, the performers mourn the death of one of their own as Elsa (Jessica Lange) brings in a new performer.

== Plot ==
Ma Petite's bloody dress is found in the woods, along with some bones, and the troupe assumes that she has been eaten by a wild animal. However, Ethel is suspicious of Elsa and accuses her of killing Ma Petite for stealing her spotlight. As the argument escalates, Ethel shoots Elsa in one of her legs, and Ethel is taken aback by the revelation that Elsa has fake legs.

A flashback reveals that Elsa was carried from the aftermath of the snuff movie to a doctor who crafted the legs for her and reminded Elsa that she was beautiful no matter what. While Ethel prepares to shoot Elsa in the head for lying to her and betraying her, Elsa throws a knife into Ethel's head, killing her.

With Stanley's help, Elsa stages a suicide for Ethel in which Ethel crashes her car into a tree with a chain around her neck, decapitating her. The troupe believes this story and mourn Ethel while Jimmy falls into a pit of despair and casts Maggie away. In response, he falls into the arms of a new recruit of the troupe, a morbidly obese woman with the stage name Ima Wiggles.

Sick of being treated badly, Amazon Eve, Desiree, Penny, and Legless Suzi plan revenge on Penny's father by sneaking into his house, knocking him unconscious and bringing him to Dell's caravan. After covering Penny's father in tar and feathers, they prepare to mutilate and kill him. However, Maggie hears his screams and begs them not go through with it. Penny lets her father go and warns him to never come near her again.

Meanwhile, Dora's daughter Regina pays the Mott household a visit to investigate her mother's disappearance and refuses to leave without seeing her. Gloria, already under stress by talking to a therapist about Dandy, lies to Regina. Dandy is tricked by Gloria into visiting the therapist, and becomes enraged when he realizes what is going on and that his mother thinks he should be institutionalized. Upon returning to the house, Dandy shoots Gloria in the head and bathes in her blood.

== Reception ==
=== Reviews ===
On review aggregator website Rotten Tomatoes, the episode has an approval rating of 85% based on 13 reviews. The critical consensus reads: "The dramatic and suspenseful elements of "Blood Bath" are finally reaching a crowning point this season, as it effectively begins interweaving its multiple storylines into one."
