= Show Stoppers (American Horror Story) =

- American Horror Story episode
- Episode no.: Season 4 Episode 12
- Directed by: Loni Peristere
- Written by: Jessica Sharzer
- Production code: 4ATS12
- Original air date: January 14, 2015
- Running time: 44 minutes

Guest appearances
- Danny Huston as Massimo Dolcefino; Celia Weston as Lillian Hemmings; Neil Patrick Harris as Chester Creb; Grace Gummer as Penny; Angela Sarafyan as Alice; Jamie Brewer as Marjorie; Chrissy Metz as Barbara

Episode chronology
← Previous "Magical Thinking"	Next → "Curtain Call"
- American Horror Story: Freak Show

"Show Stoppers" is the twelfth episode of the fourth season of the anthology television series American Horror Story, which premiered on January 14, 2015, on the cable network FX. It was written by Jessica Sharzer and directed by Loni Peristere.

== Plot ==
Maggie reveals to Stanley that she outed him as a con artist and a murderer. Stanley pleads with the troupe to let him live and tells them that Elsa murdered Ethel. They ignore him and mutilate him to resemble Meep.

Elsa introduces Jimmy to Massimo Dolcefino, who offers to make him a pair of wooden prosthetics to replace his missing hands. The twins inform Chester they no longer want to be his assistants, and Maggie volunteers in their place. Chester places her into the box, and while seeing the faces of his deceased wife and her lover, Chester saws Maggie in half without realizing, killing her. Chester "murders" Marjorie in a rage and hands himself over to the police.

Dot and Bette warn Elsa that she needs to leave immediately, as her freaks intend to avenge Ethel's murder. Desiree declares justice for Ethel, but they find Elsa is already gone. Elsa meets Dandy before she leaves town and receives $10,000 in exchange for the freak show. In the final scene, Massimo delivers Jimmy his prosthetics, revealing wooden replicas of Jimmy's lobster claws.

== Reception ==
On review aggregator website Rotten Tomatoes, the episode has an approval rating of 54% based on 13 reviews. The critical consensus reads: "In a rapid rush to tie up its myriad of loose ends, 'Show Stoppers' leaves almost nothing for the season finale."
