= Tupperware Party Massacre =

- American Horror Story episode
- Episode no.: Season 4 Episode 9
- Directed by: Loni Peristere
- Written by: Brad Falchuk
- Production code: 4ATS09
- Original air date: December 10, 2014
- Running time: 44 minutes

Guest appearances
- Gabourey Sidibe as Regina Ross; Malcolm-Jamal Warner as Angus T. Jefferson; Chrissy Metz as Barbara; Naomi Grossman as Pepper

Episode chronology
← Previous "Blood Bath"	Next → "Orphans"
- American Horror Story: Freak Show

"Tupperware Party Massacre", initially reported with the title "The Fat Lady Sings", is the ninth episode of the fourth season of the anthology television series American Horror Story, which premiered on December 10, 2014, on the cable network FX. It was written by Brad Falchuk and directed by Loni Peristere.

== Plot ==
After killing his mother, Dandy visits Maggie at the freak show to receive a reading. Maggie assures Dandy that there may be some trouble in his future but he will prevail. More confident than ever, Dandy leaves to continue his grisly work, but is stopped by an extremely drunk Jimmy. Jimmy accuses Dandy of having something to do with Dot and Bette's disappearance and threatens Dandy, knowing he had a part in the clown's murder spree. As Jimmy falls to the ground, Dandy calls him pathetic, promising vengeance on Jimmy for taking the twins away from him.

Elsa and Stanley track down the twins and bring them to the farmhouse. Stanley declares that the townspeople have gone on a rampage and that they'll be safe there, until the doctor comes to perform their surgery. The sisters realize that having separate lives isn't worth losing one of their own and decide to not get the surgery.

With the truth of his sexuality and the guilt over Ma Petite's murder becoming too much for Dell to handle, he attempts to hang himself, but is saved by Desiree. After Jimmy is too drunk to perform at a Tupperware party for the housewives, he sees hallucinations of Ethel, who tells him to get over her death and move on.

Once Jimmy leaves, Dandy shows up at the door claiming that his car broke down. He murders the group of women, gouging out their eyes and leaving them to float in the pool. Regina confronts Dandy and tells him she's contacted the police about her mother's disappearance, but is shocked when Dandy openly admits his murderous streak. He lets Regina escape, but she soon returns with Detective Colquitt. Dandy declares his wealth, promising the detective a million dollars if he kills Regina, and Colquitt shoots her in the head without hesitation.

A drunken Jimmy goes back to his caravan, only to find Dot and Bette waiting for him. Dot declares her love for Jimmy and says they can live happily together, but Jimmy declines their advances, claiming he's in love with someone else. The police arrive at the freak show and Detective Colquitt arrests Jimmy for the murders of the Tupperware party women.

== Reception ==
On review aggregator website Rotten Tomatoes, the episode has an approval rating of 69% based on 13 reviews. The critical consensus reads: "Sarah Paulson and a shocking ending save 'Tupperware Party Massacre' from being a messy tangle of plot threads."
