= Monsters Among Us =

- American Horror Story episode
- Conjoined twins Bette and Dot Tattler, portrayed by Sarah Paulson
- Episode no.: Season 4 Episode 1
- Directed by: Ryan Murphy
- Written by: Ryan Murphy; Brad Falchuk
- Production code: 4ATS01
- Original air date: October 8, 2014
- Running time: 64 minutes

Guest appearances
- John Carroll Lynch as Twisty the Clown; Skyler Samuels as Bonnie Lipton; Naomi Grossman as Pepper; Erika Ervin as Amazon Eve; Jyoti Amge as Ma Petite; Mat Fraser as Paul the Illustrated Seal; Rose Siggins as Legless Suzi; Grace Gummer as Penny Nelson; Major Dodson as Corey Bachman; Christopher Neiman as Salty; Ben Woolf as Meep the Geek

Episode chronology
← Previous "The Seven Wonders"	Next → "Massacres and Matinees"
- American Horror Story: Freak Show

"Monsters Among Us" is the premiere episode of the fourth season of the anthology television series American Horror Story, which premiered on October 8, 2014, on the cable network FX. It was co-written by creators Ryan Murphy and Brad Falchuk and directed by Murphy.

The episode introduces Elsa Mars (Jessica Lange) who runs one of the last remaining freak shows in the United States in the hamlet of Jupiter, Florida, and her recruitment of conjoined twins Bette and Dot Tattler (Sarah Paulson). It also introduces the rest of her traveling performers, and the murderous clown known as Twisty (John Carroll Lynch). This is the first episode of American Horror Story to break the anthology format, which includes the character Pepper (Naomi Grossman), who was previously featured in American Horror Story: Asylum (2012-2013).

"Monsters Among Us" is the second longest episode in the series' history, at just over one hour without commercials. It received critical acclaim and positive reviews from critics who praised the characters, acting, setting, its horror elements, and the story's tone. Critics noted the character buildup, particularly that of the Tattler Twins and Elsa Mars, and Lange's performance of David Bowie's "Life on Mars?" as the episode's highlights. The episode obtained the highest ratings of any episode in the series, and is currently the most-watched American Horror Story episode.

Jyoti Amge, currently the world's smallest living woman, has her American TV debut in "Monsters Among Us." Actors Michael Chiklis, Angela Bassett, Denis O'Hare, and Emma Roberts are all credited in the opening title sequence, but do not appear in the episode.

== Plot ==
In Jupiter, Florida, in 1952, conjoined twins Bette and Dot Tattler are taken to a hospital after a milkman finds them injured in their home, near their mother, who was brutally murdered. News spread of the twins' existence, leading local carnival freak show owner Elsa Mars attempting to recruit them to join her troupe. Although skeptical, the twins agree. Elsa's troupe of freaks include Jimmy Darling, a boy with syndactyly, and his mother Ethel Darling, a bearded lady.

Twisty, a killer clown, murders a teenage girl's boyfriend and a young boy's parents and imprisons the young boy and teen girl in an old bus. Jimmy kills a detective after he threatens to arrest the twins for their mother's murder. Elsa's group puts on their first show with Bette and Dot as "The Siamese Twins," there are only two attendees, a wealthy but shallow socialite Gloria Mott and her dangerously disturbed son Dandy. Dandy bargains with Elsa to buy Bette and Dot, but the twins refuse. Elsa later tells Ethel that she brought the twins aboard to get more attention for the show and boost her fame. As Elsa prepares for bed, it's revealed that she is an amputee, legless below the knees.

== Reception ==
"Monsters Among Us" was met with critical acclaim, and received praise from numerous television critics. Review aggregator website Rotten Tomatoes holds an approval rating of 92% based on 12 reviews. The critical consensus reads: "Freak Show sets the template for a compelling character-driven narrative with thoughtful pacing and creepy scares." Looper ranked the episode twenty-sixth in their "30 Best American Horror Story Episodes Ranked" list.

Erik Adams of The A.V. Club gave the episode a B+. IGN reviewer Matt Fowler gave the episode a 7.6 out of 10, praising the setup of the characters and the killer clown, although he felt that the introductory elements with Elsa and the twins was overlong. Critics have also praised the performances of the cast, particularly Jessica Lange and Sarah Paulson. Verne Gay of Newsday wrote: "Paulson's performance is so memorable that it's not a completely incidental question. Then, of course, there's Lange."

=== Ratings ===
The episode received a total audience of 6.13 million viewers, making it the series' most watched season premiere and the series' most watched episode ever. As a result of these particular high ratings, the show was immediately renewed for a fifth season.
