= American Horror Story: Freak Show =

Fourth season of American Horror Story

- Season 4
- Promotional poster and home media cover art
- Showrunner: Ryan Murphy
- Starring: Sarah Paulson; Evan Peters; Michael Chiklis; Frances Conroy; Denis O'Hare; Emma Roberts; Finn Wittrock; Angela Bassett; Kathy Bates; Jessica Lange
- No. of episodes: 13

Release
- Original network: FX
- Original release: October 8, 2014 – January 21, 2015

Season chronology
- ← Previous; Coven Next → Hotel

The fourth season of the American horror anthology television series American Horror Story, subtitled Freak Show, is set in 1952 Jupiter, Florida, telling the story of one of the last remaining freak shows in the United States and their struggle for survival. The ensemble cast includes Sarah Paulson, Evan Peters, Michael Chiklis, Frances Conroy, Denis O'Hare, Emma Roberts, Finn Wittrock, Angela Bassett, Kathy Bates, and Jessica Lange, with all returning from previous seasons, except newcomers Chiklis and Wittrock. The season marks the first not to be strictly anthological, with Lily Rabe, Naomi Grossman, and John Cromwell reprising their roles from the series' second cycle, Asylum.

Created by Ryan Murphy and Brad Falchuk for the cable network FX, the series is produced by 20th Century Fox Television. Freak Show was broadcast between October 8, 2014, to January 21, 2015, consisting of 13 episodes. Like its predecessors, the season was met with positive reviews and consistently strong ratings. The premiere episode attracted a series high of 6.13 million viewers, making it the most viewed episode of the series. It ultimately became FX's most-watched program ever, surpassing its previous installment, Coven. The season garnered a total of twenty Emmy Award nominations, the most for any season of American Horror Story to date, including nominations for Outstanding Limited Series, and six acting nominations for Lange, O'Hare, Wittrock, Paulson, Bassett, and Bates. In addition, Paulson won for Best Supporting Actress in a Movie or Limited Series at the 5th Critics' Choice Television Awards.

== Cast and characters ==
=== Main ===
Freak Show main cast

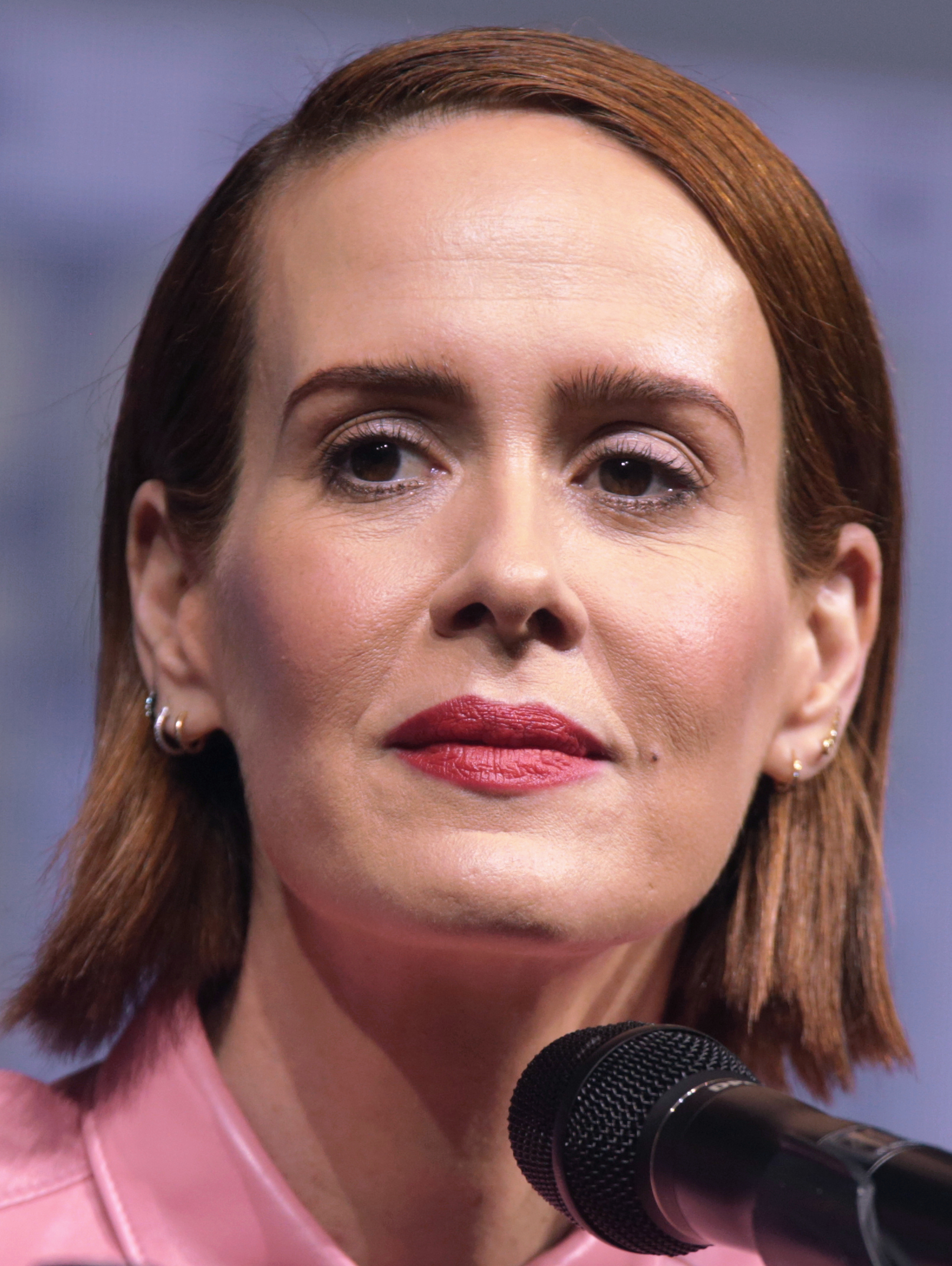
Sarah Paulson

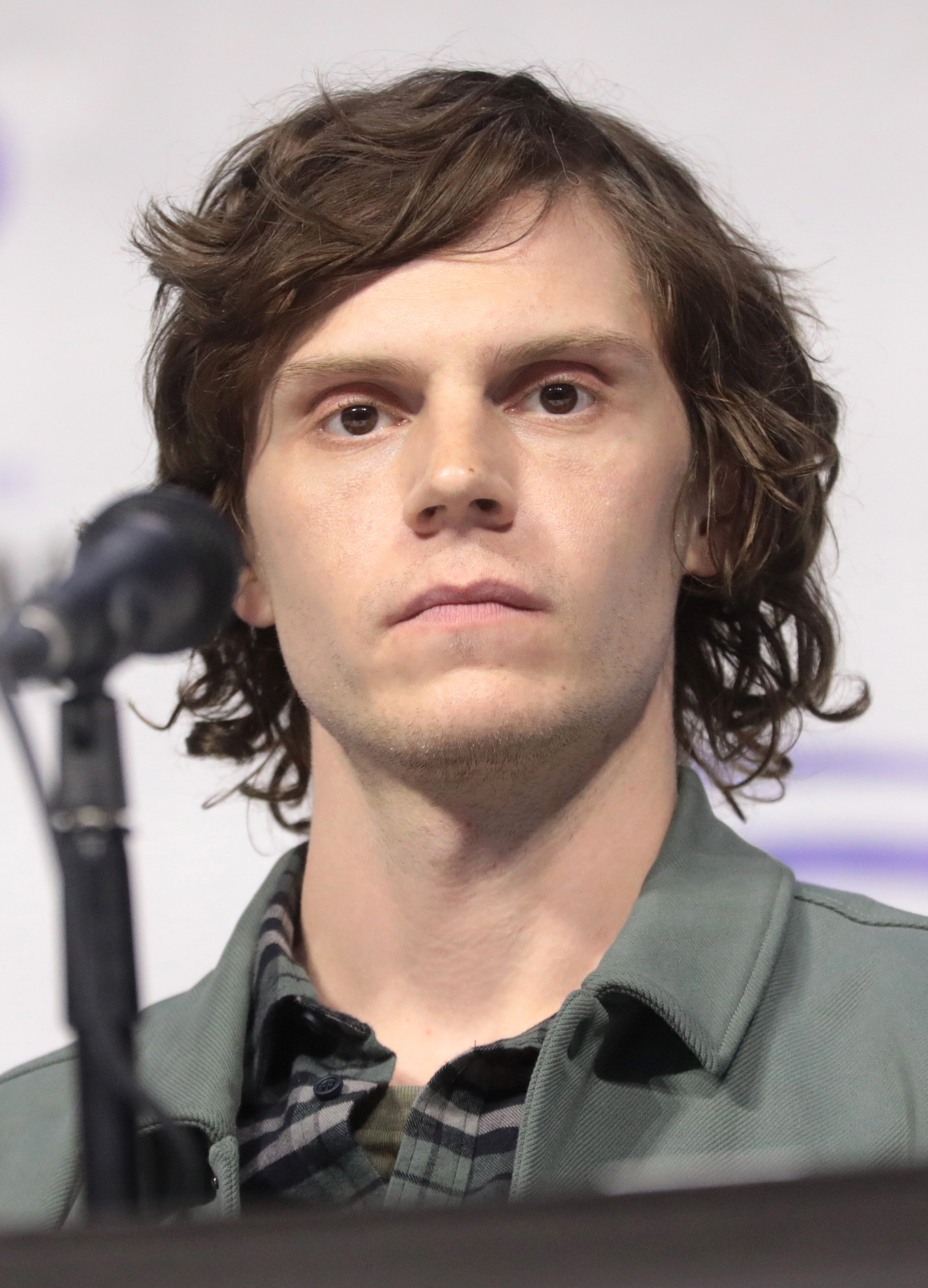
Evan Peters

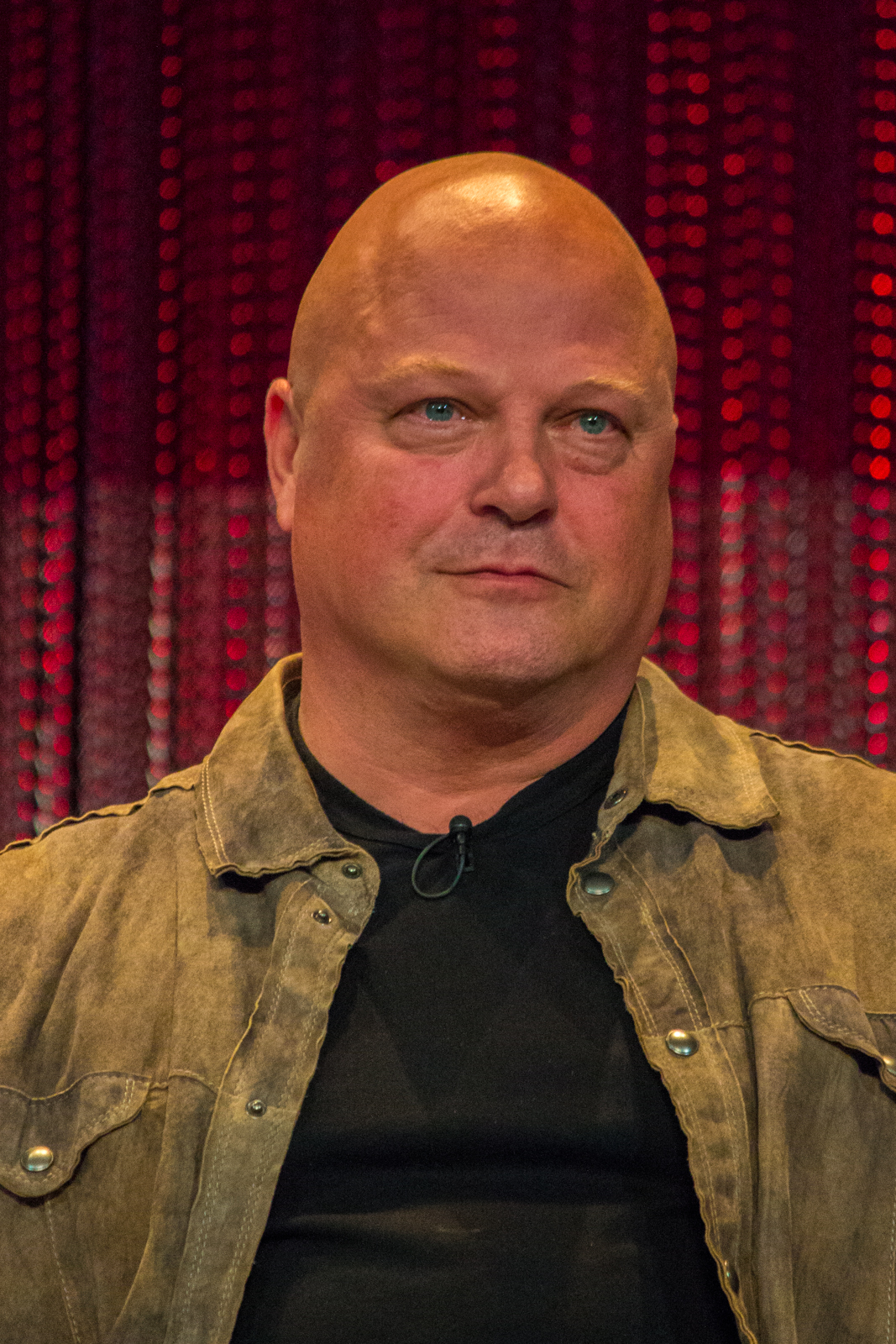
Michael Chiklis

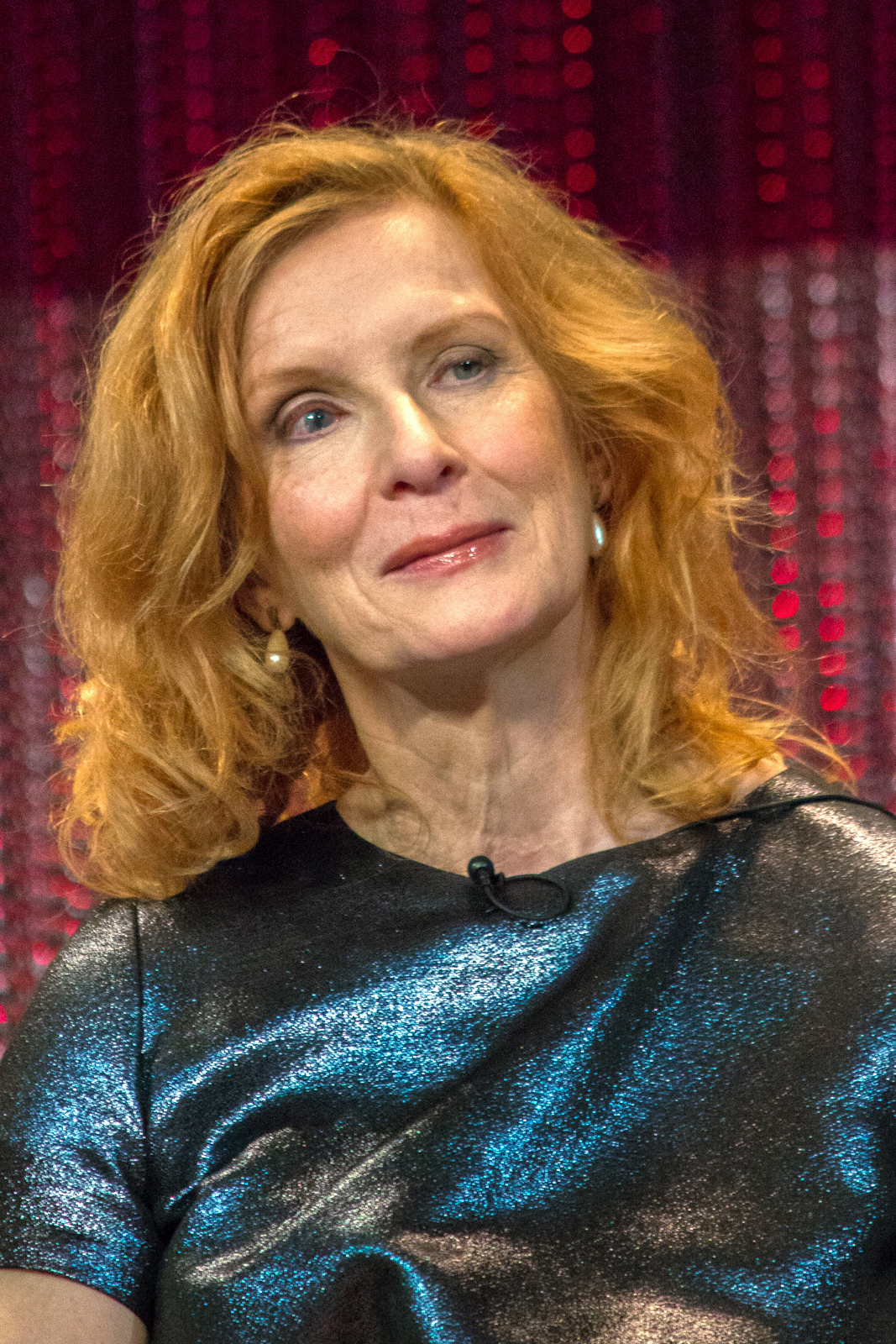
Frances Conroy

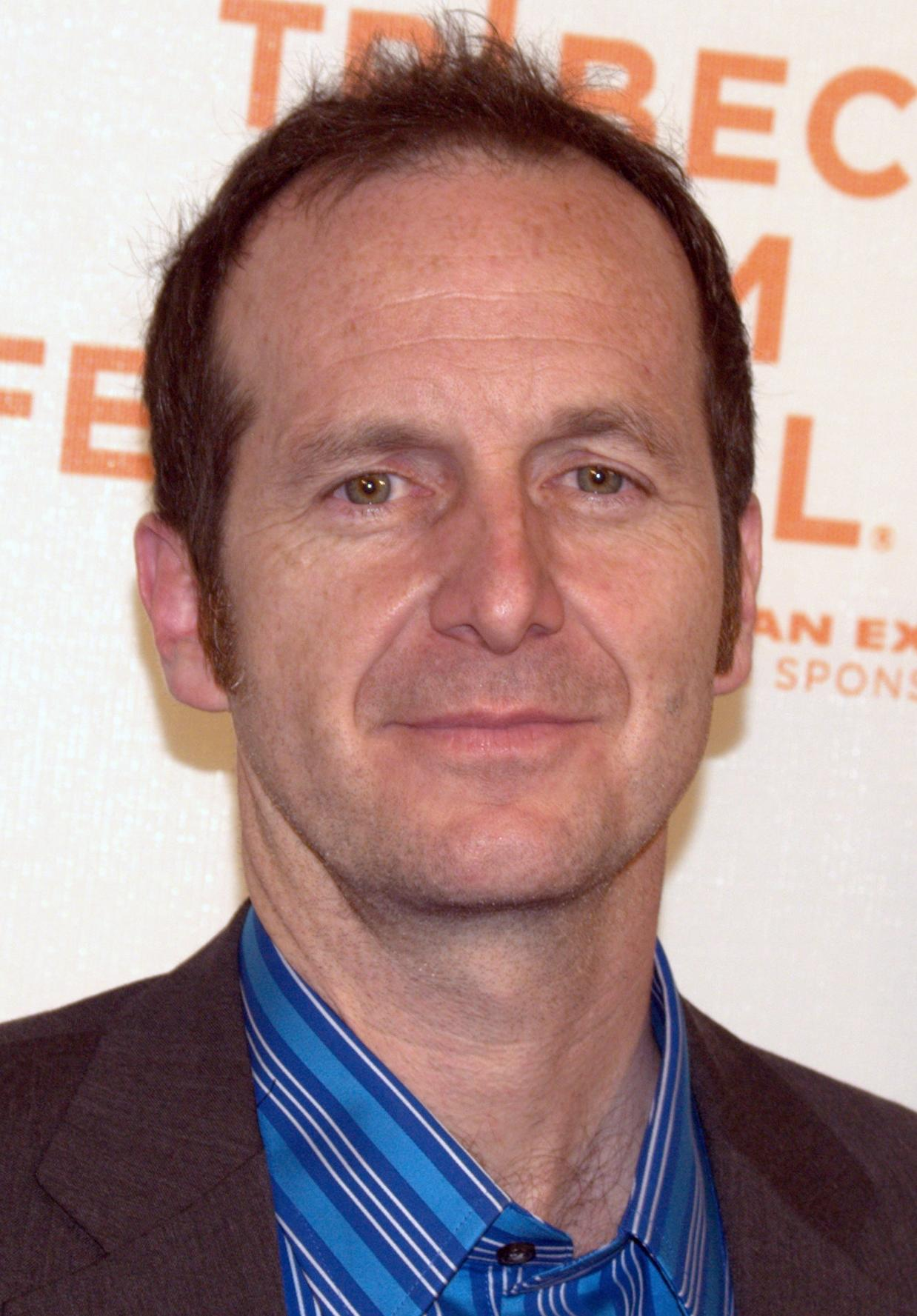
Denis O'Hare

Emma Roberts

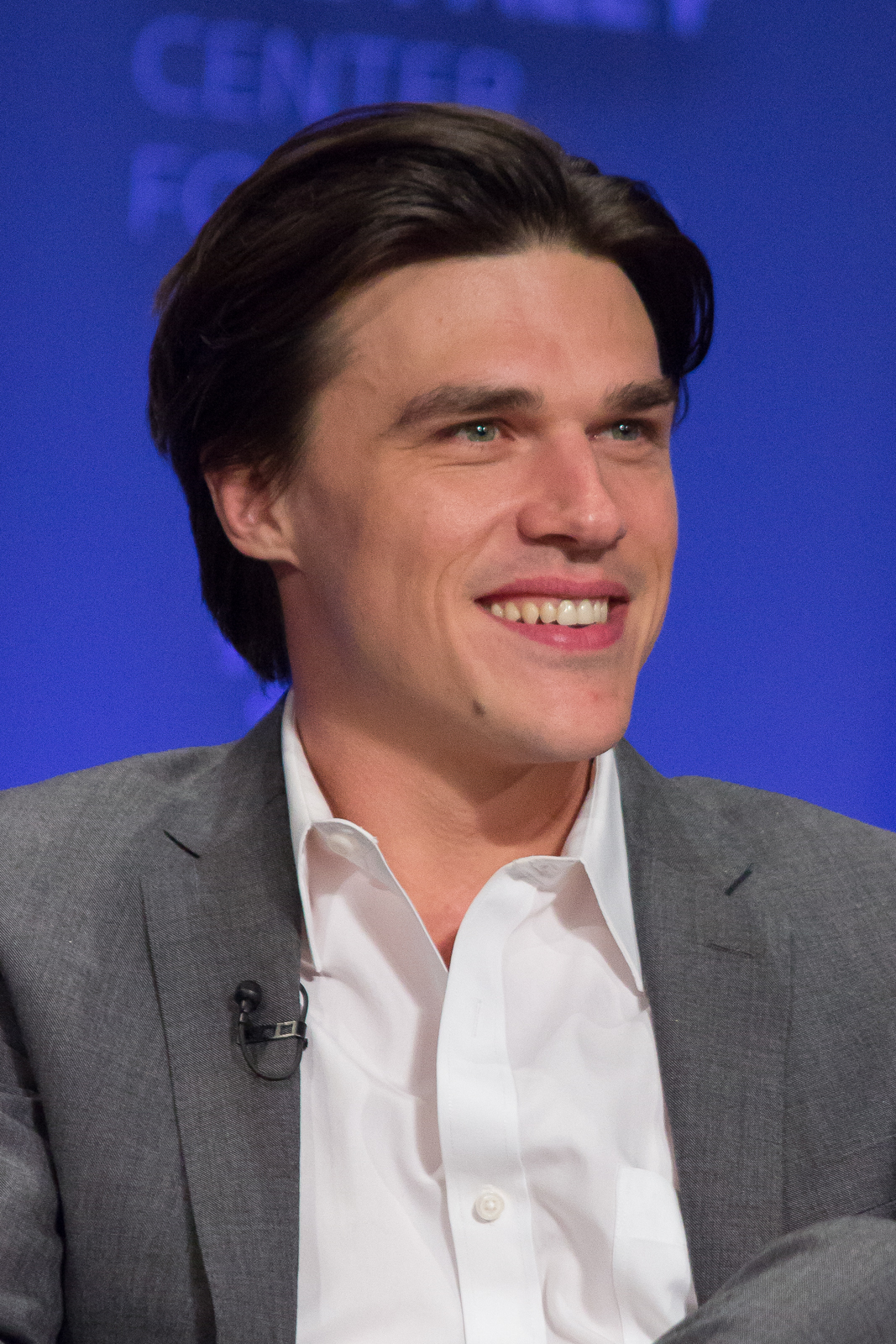
Finn Wittrock

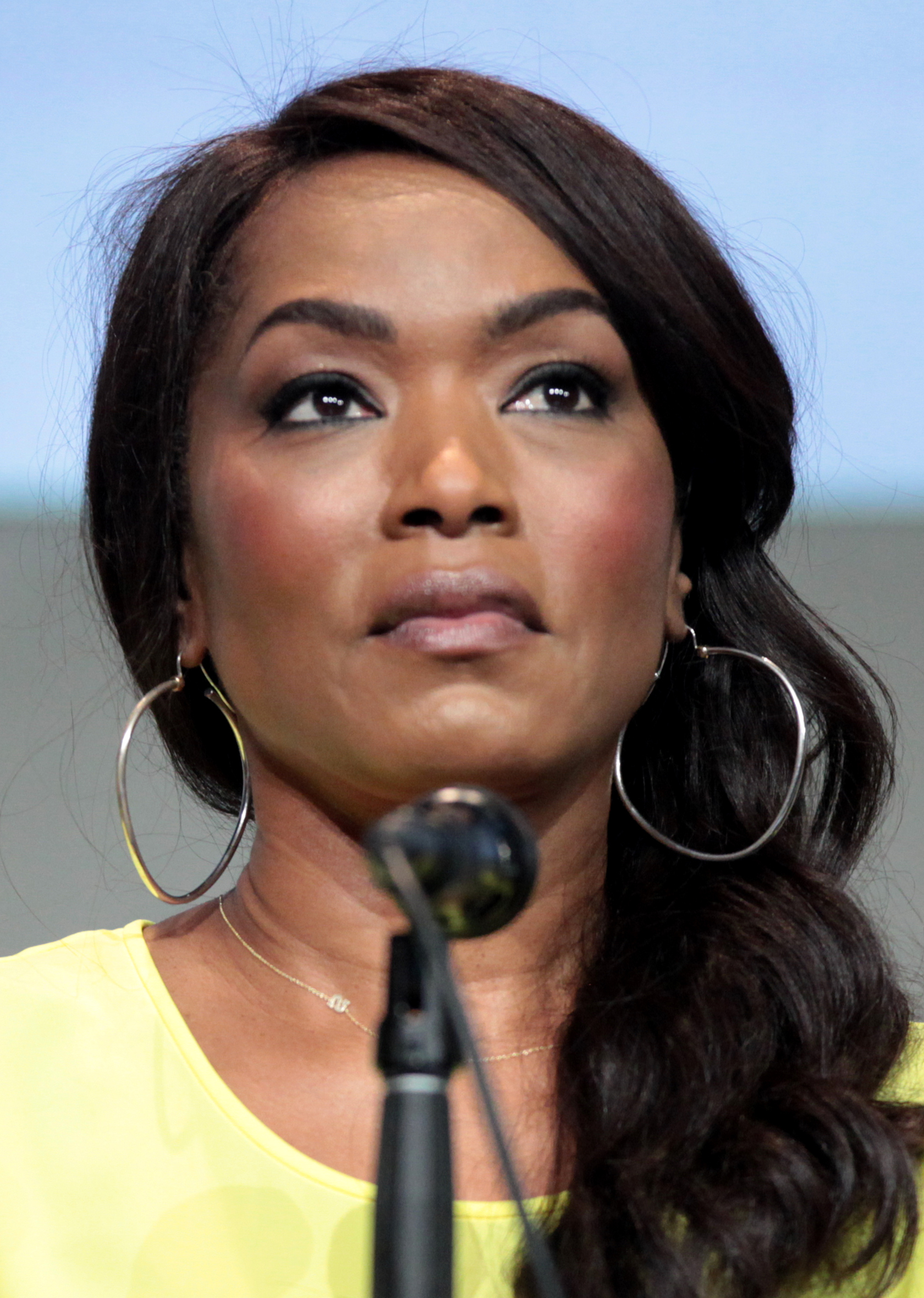
Angela Bassett

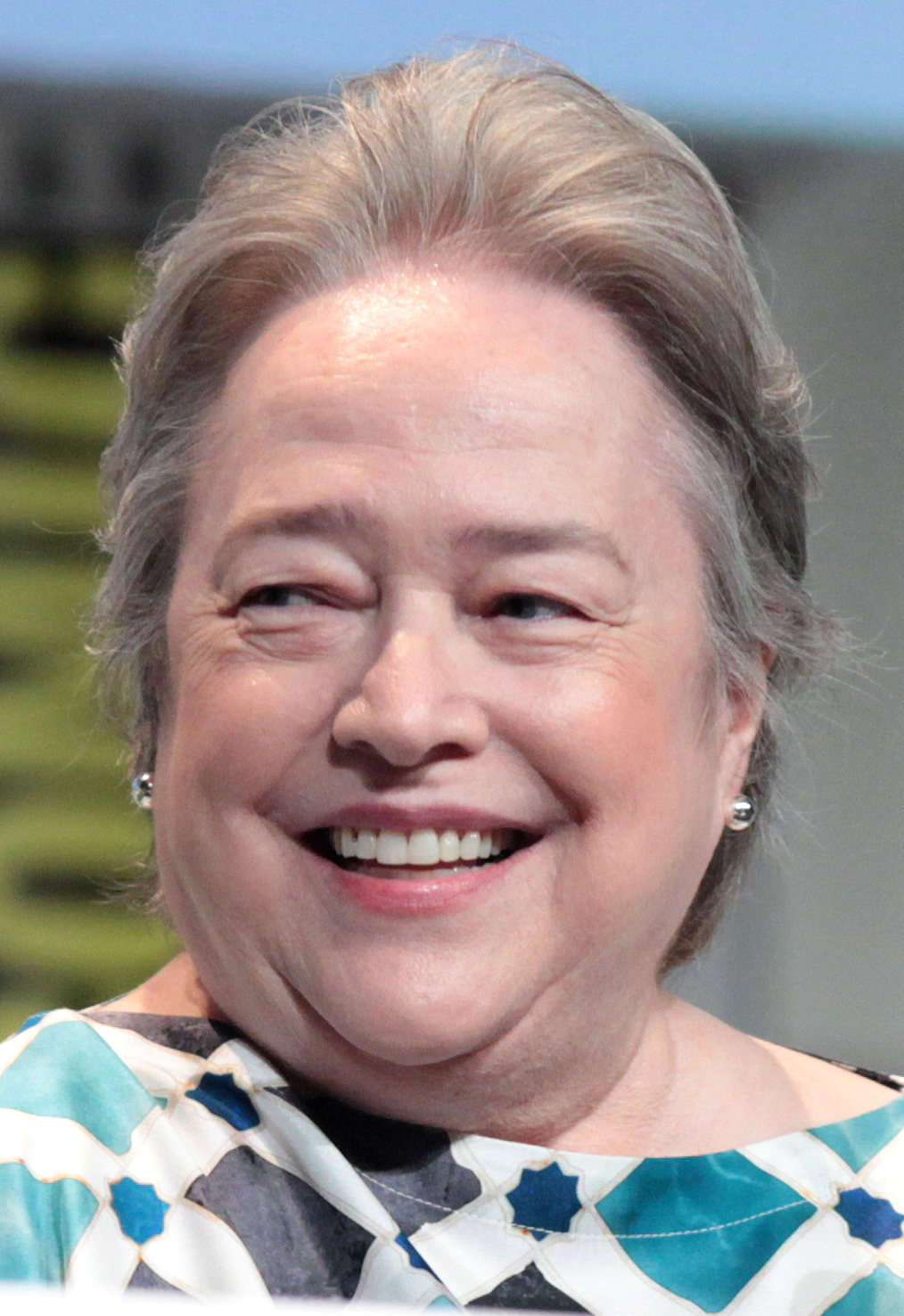
Kathy Bates

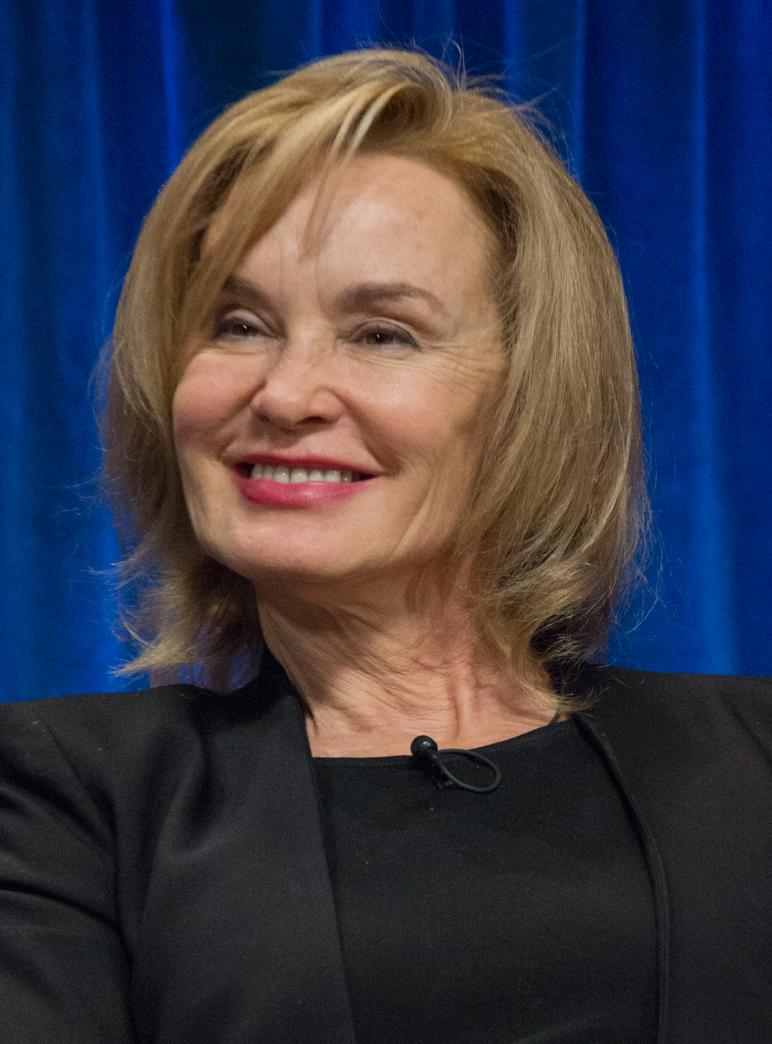
Jessica Lange

- Sarah Paulson as Bette and Dot Tattler
- Evan Peters as Jimmy Darling
- Michael Chiklis as Wendell "Dell" Toledo
- Frances Conroy as Gloria Mott
- Denis O'Hare as Stanley
- Emma Roberts as Maggie Esmerelda
- Finn Wittrock as Dandy Mott
- Angela Bassett as Desiree Dupree
- Kathy Bates as Ethel Darling
- Jessica Lange as Elsa Mars

=== Special guest stars ===
- Wes Bentley as Edward Mordrake
- Celia Weston as Lillian Hemmings
- Gabourey Sidibe as Regina Ross
- Matt Bomer as Andy Stiles
- Danny Huston as Massimo Dolcefino
- Lily Rabe as Sister Mary Eunice McKee
- Neil Patrick Harris as Chester Creb

=== Recurring ===
- Naomi Grossman as Pepper
- Grace Gummer as Penny Nelson
- Chrissy Metz as Barbara / Ima Wiggles
- Malcolm-Jamal Warner as Angus T. Jefferson
- Erika Ervin as Amazon Eve
- Mat Fraser as Paul the Illustrated Seal
- Jyoti Amge as Ma Petite
- Rose Siggins as Legless Suzi
- Ben Woolf as Meep the Geek
- Lee Tergesen as Vince Nelson
- John Carroll Lynch as Twisty the Clown
- Skyler Samuels as Bonnie Lipton
- Patti LaBelle as Dora Brown

=== Guest stars ===
- Jamie Brewer as Marjorie the Doll
- Mare Winningham as Rita Gayheart
- Matthew Glave as Larry Gayheart
- David Burtka as Michael Beck
- Heather Langenkamp as a Tupperware Party Housewife (uncredited)
- Angela Sarafyan as Alice
- John Cromwell as Hans Grüper
- Christopher Neiman as Salty

== Episodes ==
No. overall	No. in season	Title	Directed by	Written by	Original release date	Prod. code	US viewers (millions)
39	1	"Monsters Among Us"	Ryan Murphy	Ryan Murphy & Brad Falchuk	October 8, 2014	4ATS01	6.13
In Jupiter, Florida, in 1952, conjoined twins Bette and Dot Tattler are taken to a hospital after a milkman finds them injured in their home, near their mother, who was brutally murdered. News spread of the twins' existence, leading local carnival freak show owner Elsa Mars attempting to recruit them to join her troupe. Although skeptical, the twins agree. Elsa's troupe of freaks include Jimmy Darling, a boy with syndactyly, and his mother Ethel Darling, a bearded lady. Meanwhile, Twisty, a killer clown, murders a teenage girl's boyfriend and a young boy's parents and imprisons the young boy and teen girl in an old bus. Jimmy kills a detective after he threatens to arrest the twins for their mother's murder. Elsa's group puts on their first show with Bette and Dot as "The Siamese Twins," there are only two attendees, a wealthy but shallow socialite Gloria Mott and her dangerously disturbed son Dandy. Dandy bargains with Elsa to buy Bette and Dot, but the twins refuse. Elsa later tells Ethel that she brought the twins aboard to get more attention for the show and boost her fame. As Elsa prepares for bed, it's revealed that she is an amputee, legless below the knees.
40	2	"Massacres and Matinees"	Alfonso Gomez-Rejon	Tim Minear	October 15, 2014	4ATS02	4.53
The police arrive at the freak show to investigate the detective's disappearance and inform Elsa that a curfew is now in place in Jupiter following the string of murders. Meanwhile, the carnival strong man Dell Toledo, Jimmy's father, and his three-breasted hermaphrodite wife Desiree arrive and ask Elsa for a job. Elsa makes Dell head of security but soon realizes her mistake after Dell schedules a matinee against Elsa's orders, attacks Jimmy, and frames another performer, Meep, for the murder of the detective after Jimmy tried to frame Dell. Meep is arrested by the police and murdered by inmates in jail. His body is returned to the freak show, where the fellow freaks gather around and mourn. Elsewhere, Dandy asks Jimmy if he can join the freak show, as he dreams of being on stage, but after Dandy accidentally insults Jimmy, he is rebuffed and sent away. After falling into a fit of rage, Dandy returns home to find that his mother, Gloria, has hired Twisty the Clown to cheer him up. However, Twisty storms off after Dandy tries to look inside his clown bag. Dandy follows Twisty back to his trailer where the two children Twisty is holding hostage attempt an escape but are recaptured by Twisty and Dandy.
41	3	"Edward Mordrake"	Michael Uppendahl	James Wong	October 22, 2014	4ATS03	4.44
42	4	"Edward Mordrake"	Howard Deutch	Jennifer Salt	October 29, 2014	4ATS04	4.51
On Halloween, a young clairvoyant fortune-teller named Maggie Esmerelda joins the troupe. Maggie is a con artist working with a man named Stanley, who wants to sell freaks to the Museum of Morbid Curiosities. Ethel learns that she has cirrhosis of the liver and a limited time to live. Meanwhile, Dandy becomes more obsessed with Twisty and goes trick or treating in a homemade Twisty costume. After attempting to kill his maid, Dora, and backing off after she calls him out, he visits Twisty's trailer and torments the children being held captive. Twisty stalks a family with a daughter scared of clowns and kidnaps her teenage brother. Later, the freak show troupe refuses to perform on Halloween due to the superstition surrounding an English freak from the 1800s named Edward Mordrake. Elsa refuses to believe this, practices on stage, and Mordrake appears, looking to take a soul from the saddest freak to join his spiritual troupe in Hell. Mordrake learns the past of Ethel, Legless Suzi, Paul the Illustrated Seal, and Elsa. After revisiting her memories, Elsa begs Mordrake to take her, but he decides to continue. Meanwhile, Jimmy and Maggie stumble across Twisty's trailer. After freeing the children and phoning the police, Maggie hides as Twisty tries to murder Jimmy. Mordrake finds Twisty and listens to his backstory. Mordrake, seeing the pain and grief Twisty has suffered, kills Twisty and adopts him into his spiritual troupe. A distraught Dandy takes Twisty's mask and returns home, where he murders Dora. As the town learns that Twisty is dead, the curfew is lifted; and many residents of the town visit the freak show to thank Jimmy. Elsa announces her grand premiere to the town, and tickets sell out. Stanley arrives at the freakshow, where he poses as a Hollywood agent.
43	5	"Pink Cupcakes"	Michael Uppendahl	Jessica Sharzer	November 5, 2014	4ATS05	4.22
Stanley attempts to recruit Elsa by making deals with her about her possibly having her own television show. Jimmy finds a drunk Desiree while searching for Dell, and while the two bond, Jimmy begins pleasuring Desiree with his hands. However, she begins bleeding from her vagina and later discovers she had a miscarriage. The doctor also reveals to Desiree that she is fully female. Dell meets with his regular lover, Andy. The two fight and Dell leaves. Dandy finds Andy and the two go to Twisty's bus, where Dandy kills him. Gloria receives a call from Dora's daughter, Regina Ross, who asks to speak with her mother, but Gloria lies and tells her that she will not be able to contact her mother for a while. Elsa sees Stanley taking the twins on a picnic, which makes her jealous and angry. Later, she lies to the twins saying she is taking them to a fitting but drives them straight to Gloria and Dandy's mansion.
44	6	"Bullseye"	Howard Deutch	John J. Gray	November 12, 2014	4ATS06	3.65
Elsa brings out an old spinning wheel and begins throwing daggers at it to prepare for her upcoming TV show. The night of her birthday party, she learns of the troupe's suspicions of her involvement with Bette and Dot's disappearance. Elsa reminds them that none of them would be here without her, and they should be grateful for her saving them. To prove their loyalty, Elsa demands that one of them be strapped to the wheel while she does her routine. Paul reluctantly volunteers, and Elsa purposefully hits him in the gut and refuses to call a doctor. Dandy declares his love for the twins and wants to marry them. Dot learns of a pair of conjoined twins that have been separated for the first time and thinks Dandy could pay for the surgery. Stanley pressures Maggie into leading Jimmy to a barn and killing him. However, she suggests Ma Petite instead, but she can't go through with it. She begs Jimmy to leave town with her immediately, but Stanley confronts her angrily, telling her they need the hands of Jimmy no matter what.
45	7	"Test of Strength"	Anthony Hemingway	Crystal Liu	November 19, 2014	4ATS07	3.91
The twins leave Dandy after Dot learns that he read her diary, and Dandy becomes furious. Upon returning to the freak show, Jimmy confronts Elsa for selling the twins. Still, they tell Jimmy he misunderstood and lie for Elsa, eventually blackmailing her for 50% of the box office returns in the process. After caring for Paul, Penny returns home to tell her father that she is moving out, but he knocks her out and has his "artist friend" tattoo her face and head and give her a forked tongue. Meanwhile, Stanley sees Dell at the gay bar and threatens to out him unless he delivers him the body of a freak. While trying to kill Amazon Eve, Dell underestimates her size and strength and is beaten up by her. Jimmy later tells Dell that he knows Dell is his father, and they bond. Later that night, Dell sneaks into Ma Petite's tent and brings her a pretty dress. She tries it on, and he hugs her until he crushes her, breaking her spine in the process. He delivers the body to Stanley, who sells it to Lillian Hemmings from the Museum of Morbid Curiosities, where Ma Petite's body is shown on exhibition.
46	8	"Blood Bath"	Bradley Buecker	Ryan Murphy	December 3, 2014	4ATS08	3.30
Ma Petite's bloody dress is found in the woods, along with some bones, and the troupe assumes that she has been mauled and eaten by a wild animal. However, Ethel accuses Elsa of killing Ma Petite, and a flashback reveals that Elsa was carried from the aftermath of the snuff movie to a doctor who crafted the legs for her. While Ethel prepares to shoot Elsa in the head for lying and betraying her, Elsa throws a knife into Ethel's head, killing her. With the help of Stanley, they fake Ethel's suicide. The troupe mourns Ethel while Jimmy falls into a depression and casts Maggie away. In response, he falls into the arms of a new recruit of the troupe, a morbidly obese woman with the stage name Ima Wiggles. Meanwhile, Dora's daughter Regina visits the Mott household to investigate her mother's disappearance and refuses to leave without seeing her. Gloria tricks Dandy into visiting the therapist and he becomes enraged when he realizes what is going on. Upon returning to the house, Dandy shoots Gloria in the head and bathes in her blood.
47	9	"Tupperware Party Massacre"	Loni Peristere	Brad Falchuk	December 10, 2014	4ATS09	3.07
After killing his mother, a deranged Dandy visits Maggie at the freak show to receive a reading. Maggie assures Dandy that there may be some trouble in his future, but he will prevail. More confident than ever, Dandy leaves to continue his work but is stopped by an extremely drunk Jimmy. Jimmy accuses Dandy of having something to do with the twins' disappearance and threatens Dandy. With the truth of his sexuality and guilt over Ma Petite's murder becoming too much for Dell, he attempts to hang himself but is later saved by Desiree. Once Jimmy leaves a Tupperware party, Dandy shows up and murders the whole group of women. Regina confronts Dandy and tells him she has contacted the police about her mother but is shocked when Dandy openly admits his murderous streak. He lets Regina escape, but she soon returns with Detective Colquitt. Dandy promises the detective one million dollars if he kills Regina, and Colquitt shoots Regina in the head without hesitation. A drunken Jimmy goes back to his caravan, only to find Dot and Bette waiting for him. Dot declares her love for Jimmy and says they can live happily together, with Bette agreeing, but Jimmy declines their advances, claiming he is in love with someone else. Later, police cars show up at the freak show and arrest Jimmy for the murders of the Tupperware party women.
48	10	"Orphans"	Bradley Buecker	James Wong	December 17, 2014	4ATS10	2.99
Pepper's life is shattered when she finds that her husband, Salty, has died in his sleep. Elsa reveals to Desiree that she began her troupe after noticing the freaks were not being treated as they should be. Elsa found Pepper at an orphanage and recruited Ma Petite to act as Pepper's child and later found Salty. Desiree suggests returning Pepper to her elder sister. Meanwhile, Stanley convinces Elsa to let him take care of Salty's body after telling her he would have the pinhead cremated, but he chops off the head and sells it to the Museum of Morbid Curiosities. Maggie confesses to Desiree that she and Stanley are con artists. The two visit the museum and are shocked to find Ma Petite's body, Salty's severed head, and Jimmy's hands on display. Elsa tracks down Pepper's sister, Rita, and convinces her to take in Pepper. Nine years later, Rita gives birth to a deformed baby, and her husband convinces her to frame Pepper for the baby's murder. After committing Pepper to Briarcliff, Sister Mary Eunice has Pepper assist her in the library sorting magazines. While doing so, Pepper finds a magazine with Elsa on the cover.
49	11	"Magical Thinking"	Michael Goi	Jennifer Salt	January 7, 2015	4ATS11	3.11
Stanley convinces Jimmy that the only way to pay for a lawyer is to sever one of his hands and sell it. After smuggling Jimmy out of prison, Stanley puts him under. Jimmy awakens to find both of his hands have been removed. Dell visits him in the hospital and realizes Stanley double-crossed Jimmy. Bette and Dot set out to find someone to deflower them when they meet a traveling salesman named Chester. Chester dreams of performing his magic in front of an audience with his Dummy named Marjorie. Bette and Dot seduce Chester and sleep with him. As the cops are transporting Jimmy back to prison, Eve throws a brick through the windshield, and she and Dell kill both officers and rescue Jimmy. A flashback reveals that Chester's wife, Lucy, had an affair with a woman named Alice, and in a jealous rage, he murdered the two, believing that Marjorie committed the murders. Maggie tells Elsa about Ma Petite's true fate. Once Dell confesses his crime of smothering Ma Petite to Desiree, Elsa shoots him in the head from behind.
50	12	"Show Stoppers"	Loni Peristere	Jessica Sharzer	January 14, 2015	4ATS12	2.94
Maggie reveals to Stanley that she outed him as a con artist and a murderer. Stanley pleads with the troupe to let him live and tells them that Elsa murdered Ethel. However, they ignore him and mutilate him to resemble Meep. Elsa introduces Jimmy to Massimo Dolcefino, who offers to make him a pair of wooden prosthetics to replace his missing hands. The twins inform Chester they no longer want to be his assistants, and Maggie volunteers in their place. Chester places her into the box, and while seeing the faces of his deceased wife and her lover, Chester saws Maggie in half without realizing, killing her. Chester "murders" Marjorie in a rage and hands himself over to the police. Dot and Bette warn Elsa that she needs to leave immediately, as her freaks intend to avenge Ethel's murder. Desiree declares justice for Ethel, but they find Elsa is already gone. Elsa meets Dandy before she leaves town and receives $10,000 in exchange for the freak show. In the final scene, Massimo delivers Jimmy his prosthetics, revealing wooden replicas of Jimmy's lobster claws.
51	13	"Curtain Call"	Bradley Buecker	John J. Gray	January 21, 2015	4ATS13	3.27
In a psychotic rage, Dandy massacres the freaks. Jimmy returns and finds everyone but Desiree dead. Dandy kidnaps Bette and Dot, and they agree to marry him. At dinner, Dandy is drugged by Desiree with the help of the twins and Jimmy. Dandy awakens to find himself locked in Hardeen Houdini's Chinese water torture cell. Desiree, Jimmy, Bette, and Dot watch on as he drowns. Meanwhile, Elsa arrives in Hollywood and meets Michael Beck, the Junior vice-president of casting, and they later marry. In 1960, Elsa receives a star on the Hollywood Walk of Fame and is later confronted by her husband and the president of WBN that a copy of the snuff film has surfaced. Realizing that her career is nearly over, Elsa agrees to perform on Halloween, knowing this will summon Edward Mordrake. As Elsa performs, Desiree, now with a family of her own, is shown watching the broadcast, along with a pregnant Bette and Dot, who are happily married to Jimmy. Mordrake and his coterie appear and take Elsa to the afterlife, and she is greeted by Ma Petite and all her other deceased freaks, including Ethel, who welcomes her back.

== Production ==
=== Development ===
"It feels like a Douglas Sirk movie; it's very 1952 presentational and then the horror is an unexpected jab. As opposed to last year, which was crazy camera work and comedy. This year feels different."

— Series co-creator Ryan Murphy on the fourth season

In November 2013, FX announced that the show had been renewed for a fourth season. Series co-creator Ryan Murphy hinted that clues about the fourth season would be hidden in the final episodes of the third season. In March 2014, the season was revealed to be set at a carnival, according to co-executive producer/writer Douglas Petrie. It was also revealed that Lange would be playing a role similar to Marlene Dietrich. Murphy revealed that the season would take place in 1950, adding: "If you look historically what happened in the year 1950, there's some more clues in that year. It's a period piece. We try and do the opposite of what we've done before. Jessica Lange has already started practicing her German accent, so I'm very excited!" Murphy indicated that this season drew inspiration from Tod Browning's Freaks and Herk Harvey's Carnival of Souls. This season featured the largest set ever constructed for American Horror Story, with Murphy stating: "We had to build an entire city. We built an entire huge compound, and then we had to build the interior of all those buildings on set. It's all, period. And it's all based on [production designer] Mark Worthington's immaculate research."

=== Casting ===
Ryan Murphy confirmed that Jessica Lange would be returning for a fourth season, although said to be in a reduced capacity. She portrayed Elsa Mars, the owner of the freak show. In November 2013, Murphy said he approached Kathy Bates and Angela Bassett to return. Bassett later confirmed in an interview with Access Hollywood that she would be indeed coming back. They portrayed Ethel Darling and Desiree Dupree, respectively. In an interview with The Hollywood Reporter, Sarah Paulson revealed she would be returning, possibly for a main role, which was later revealed to be the conjoined twins Bette and Dot Tattler. It was announced at the PaleyFest 2014 that the cast members present at the panel would all be returning for the fourth season in some capacity, including Denis O'Hare (Stanley), Emma Roberts (Maggie Esmerelda), Frances Conroy (Gloria Mott), Evan Peters (Jimmy Darling), and Gabourey Sidibe (Regina Ross). Jamie Brewer was also added to the present roster, although Murphy later indicated Brewer may not appear during the season. She was later confirmed to portray the ventriloquist dummy Marjorie after appearing in a promo for the final episodes. Additionally, Michael Chiklis was announced to play the father of Peters' character and ex-husband of Bates' character, the strongman Dell Toledo. Finn Wittrock was the last lead actor joining the cast. He portrayed the psychopathic Dandy Mott.

In July 2014, TVLine reported that Wes Bentley would appear in the season' two-part Halloween episode as Edward Mordrake. At the 2014 San Diego Comic-Con, it was announced that John Carroll Lynch would portray one of the central antagonists during the season, Twisty the Clown. In August 2014, R&B singer Patti LaBelle joined the cast for a four-episode story arc as the mother of Sidibe's character, named Dora, the Motts' housekeeper. Also in August 2014, it was revealed that Matt Bomer would be guest-starring in one episode as Andy, Dell's secret lover. Murphy took to his Twitter account to announce that the world's smallest woman Jyoti Amge has joined the cast as Ma Petite. Murphy had written a role specifically for Coven alum Leslie Jordan, but he did not appear on the show due to scheduling conflicts.

In September 2014, it was reported that Asylum alum Naomi Grossman would return to portray Pepper, which marked the first time a character appeared in multiple seasons of the series. Lily Rabe also reprised her Asylum character Sister Mary Eunice McKee in the tenth episode, "Orphans". Mare Winningham made an appearance in the same episode, as Pepper's sister Rita. Neil Patrick Harris guest starred in two episodes as Chester, who takes over the freak show when Elsa leaves for Hollywood. Harris' husband, David Burtka, appeared in the season finale as Elsa's husband.

=== Filming ===
"There's something going on there that is so non-American but totally American, so sexy and dark but there's hope everywhere."

— Co-creator Brad Falchuk on shooting in New Orleans, Louisiana

At Paley Center for Media's 2014 PaleyFest event, Ryan Murphy announced that the season's filming would take place again in New Orleans, Louisiana, although the show's setting is in Jupiter, Florida. The premiere episode was directed by co-creator Murphy, his first effort since the pilot. Principal photography for the season began on July 15, 2014. Production on the season concluded on December 19, 2014.

=== Soundtrack ===
Every cover song performed in Freak Show was released by 20th Century Fox TV Records in online music stores following the broadcast of the episode in which it appeared, except the cover of David Bowie's "Heroes", performed by Jessica Lange in "Curtain Call."

Song	Original artist	Covered by	Performed in	Release date
"Life on Mars?"	David Bowie	Jessica Lange	"Monsters Among Us" "Pink Cupcakes" "Curtain Call"	October 9, 2014
"Criminal"	Fiona Apple	Sarah Paulson	"Massacres and Matinees"	October 15, 2014
"Gods and Monsters"	Lana Del Rey	Jessica Lange	"Edward Mordrake (Part 1)"	October 22, 2014
"September Song"	Walter Huston	Jessica Lange	"Bullseye"	November 12, 2014
"Come as You Are"	Nirvana	Evan Peters	"Test of Strength"	November 19, 2014

== Release ==
=== Marketing ===
A video released in July 2014, entitled "Fallen Angel", was reported by many news sources to be an official Freak Show trailer. The video – which featured the American Horror Story title card – was later taken down after FX confirmed it was fan-made. Before the debut of the fan-made video, FX had not released any official trailers concerning the upcoming season. The first official teaser was released on August 20, 2014, entitled "Admit One".

As with previous seasons, FX released a series of teaser trailers on the show's YouTube page. FX also used the marketing hashtag #WirSindAlleFreaks in the German language, and its English translation #WeAreAllFreaks.

=== Home media ===
American Horror Story: Freak Show – The Complete Fourth Season
Set Details		Special Features
13 Episodes; 4 Disc Set (DVD); 3 Disc Set (BD); English 5.1 Dolby Digital & Spanish 2.0 Surround; Subtitles: English SDH, Spanish, French; Runtime: 648 Minutes		Getting Freaky: A Peek Inside the Tent; Two Heads are Better Than One: Learn More About Bette and Dotte Tattler; Twisty: Behind the Mask of Terror; Freaklore: Edward Mordrake: The Mysterie of the Two Faced Man; Extra-Ordinary Artists: Interviews with the Real-Life Cast "Freaks"; The Premiere: The Red Carpet Premiere with Cast
Release Dates
Region 1	Region 2	Region 4
October 6, 2015	October 26, 2015	October 13, 2015

== Reception ==
=== Critical response ===
American Horror Story: Freak Show has received mostly positive reviews from critics. On Metacritic, it scored a 69 out of 100 based on 19 reviews, indicating "generally favorable" reviews. The review aggregation website Rotten Tomatoes reported a 77% approval rating with an average rating of 7.29/10 based on 202 reviews. The website's consensus reads, "Though it may turn off new viewers unaccustomed to its unabashed weirdness, Freak Show still brings the thrills, thanks to its reliably stylish presentation and game cast."

American Horror Story season 4: Critical reception by episode
Season 4 (2014–15): Percentage of positive critics' reviews tracked by the website Rotten Tomatoes

=== Ratings ===
Nielsen Media Research, which records streaming viewership on certain U.S. television screens, reported that American Horror Story: Freak Show garnered 730 million minutes of watch time, averaging 56.2 million minutes viewed per episode, between May 1, 2024, and August 31, 2026.

== Awards and nominations ==
In its fourth season, the series was nominated for 76 awards, 21 of which were won.

Year	Association	Category	Nominee(s)	Result
2015	46th NAACP Image Awards	Outstanding Actress in a TV Movie, Mini-Series or Dramatic Special	Angela Bassett	Nominated
2015	46th NAACP Image Awards	Outstanding TV Movie, Mini-Series or Dramatic Special	American Horror Story: Freak Show	Nominated
2015	72nd Golden Globe Awards	Best Actress – Miniseries or TV Film	Jessica Lange	Nominated
2015	72nd Golden Globe Awards	Best Supporting Actress – Series, Miniseries or TV Film	Kathy Bates	Nominated
2015	19th Satellite Awards	Best TV Series – Genre	American Horror Story: Freak Show	Nominated
2015	19th Satellite Awards	Best Supporting Actress – Series, Miniseries or TV Film	Sarah Paulson	Won
2015	41st People's Choice Awards	Favorite Cable Sci-Fi/Fantasy TV Show	American Horror Story: Freak Show	Nominated
2015	41st People's Choice Awards	Favorite Sci-Fi/Fantasy TV Actress	Jessica Lange	Nominated
2015	26th PGA Awards	Outstanding Producer of Long-Form TV	Brad Buecker, Dante Di Loreto, Brad Falchuk, Joseph Incaprera, Alexis Martin Woodall, Tim Minear, Ryan Murphy, Jennifer Salt, James Wong (also for Coven)	Nominated
2015	19th ADG Awards	TV movie or Mini-Series	Mark Worthington (for "Massacres and Matinees")	Won
2015	17th CDG Awards	Outstanding Made for TV Movie or Mini-Series	Lou Eyrich	Won
2015	Make-Up Artists & Hair Stylists Guild Awards 2015	Mini-Series or TV Movie Period and/or Character Make-up	Eryn Krueger Mekash, Kim Ayers	Won
2015	Make-Up Artists & Hair Stylists Guild Awards 2015	Mini-Series or TV Movie Period Special Make-up Effects	Eryn Krueger Mekash, Michael Mekash, Christopher Nelson (petition)	Won
2015	Make-Up Artists & Hair Stylists Guild Awards 2015	Mini-Series or TV Movie Period and/or Character Hair Styling	Monte C. Haught, Michelle Ceglia	Won
2015	13th VES Awards	Outstanding Supporting Visual Effects in a Visual Effects-Driven Photoreal/Live Action Broadcast Program	Jason Piccioni, Jason Spratt, Mike Kirylo, Justin Bal, Eric Roberts (for "Edward Mordrake: Part 2")	Won
2015	13th VES Awards	Outstanding Compositing in a Photoreal/Live Action Broadcast Program	Tommy Tran, JV Pike, Rob Lutz, Matt Lefferts (for "Edward Mordrake: Part 2")	Nominated
2015	62nd MPSE Golden Reel Awards	TV Short Form Music Score	Episode: "Monsters Among Us"	Nominated
2015	51st CAS Awards	Outstanding Achievement in Sound Mixing – TV Movie or Mini-Series	Bruce Litecky, CAS (Production Mixer); Joe Earle, CAS (Re-recording Mixer); Doug Andham, CAS (Re-recording Mixer); Evan Daum (ADR Mixer); Kyle Billingsley (Foley Mixer) (for "Monsters Among Us")	Nominated
2015	6th Dorian Awards	TV Musical Performance of the Year	Jessica Lange (for "Life on Mars?")	Nominated
2015	6th Dorian Awards	Campy TV Show of the Year	American Horror Story: Freak Show	Nominated
2015	Fangoria Chainsaw Awards 2015	Best TV Series	American Horror Story: Freak Show	Nominated
2015	Fangoria Chainsaw Awards 2015	Best TV Actress	Sarah Paulson	Won
2015	Fangoria Chainsaw Awards 2015	Best TV Supporting Actor	Finn Wittrock	2nd place
2015	41st Saturn Awards	Best Actress on TV	Jessica Lange	Nominated
2015	41st Saturn Awards	Best Guest Starring Role on TV	Neil Patrick Harris	Nominated
2015	41st Saturn Awards	Best Syndicated/Cable TV Series	American Horror Story: Freak Show	Nominated
2015	Glamour Awards 2014	International TV Actress	Jessica Lange	Nominated
2015	36th Young Artist Awards	Best Performance in a TV Series - Guest Starring Young Actor 15-21	Dalton E. Gray	Nominated
2015	SXSW Film Design Awards 2015	Excellence in Title Design	American Horror Story: Freak Show	Nominated
2015	5th Critics' Choice TV Awards	Most Bingeworthy Show	American Horror Story: Freak Show	Nominated
2015	5th Critics' Choice TV Awards	Best Actress in a Movie or Limited Series	Jessica Lange	Nominated
2015	5th Critics' Choice TV Awards	Best Supporting Actor in a Movie or Limited Series	Finn Wittrock	Nominated
2015	5th Critics' Choice TV Awards	Best Supporting Actress in a Movie or Limited Series	Sarah Paulson	Won
2015	BMI Film & TV Awards 2015	BMI Cable TV Music Awards	Mac Quayle	Won
2015	BMI Film & TV Awards 2015	BMI Cable TV Music Awards	Charlie Clouser	Won
2015	BMI Film & TV Awards 2015	BMI Cable TV Music Awards	César Dávila-Irizarry	Won
2015	67th Primetime Emmy Awards	Outstanding Limited/Anthology Series	American Horror Story: Freak Show	Nominated
2015	67th Primetime Emmy Awards	Outstanding Lead Actress in a Limited/Anthology Series or Movie	Jessica Lange	Nominated
2015	67th Primetime Emmy Awards	Outstanding Supporting Actor in a Limited/ Anthology Series or Movie	Denis O'Hare	Nominated
2015	67th Primetime Emmy Awards	Outstanding Supporting Actor in a Limited/ Anthology Series or Movie	Finn Wittrock	Nominated
2015	67th Primetime Emmy Awards	Outstanding Supporting Actress in a Limited/Anthology Series or Movie	Sarah Paulson	Nominated
2015	67th Primetime Emmy Awards	Outstanding Supporting Actress in a Limited/Anthology Series or Movie	Angela Bassett	Nominated
2015	67th Primetime Emmy Awards	Outstanding Supporting Actress in a Limited/Anthology Series or Movie	Kathy Bates	Nominated
2015	67th Primetime Emmy Awards	Outstanding Directing for a Limited/Anthology Series or Movie	Ryan Murphy (for "Monsters Among Us")	Nominated
2015	67th Primetime Creative Arts Emmy Awards	Outstanding Hairstyling for a Limited Series or Movie	Monte C. Haught, Michelle Ceglia, Daina Daigle, Amy Wood, Sherri B. Hamilton	Won
2015	67th Primetime Creative Arts Emmy Awards	Outstanding Main Title Design	Ryan Murphy, Kyle Cooper, Lee Nelson, Nadia Tzuo	Nominated
2015	67th Primetime Creative Arts Emmy Awards	Outstanding Special Visual Effects in a Supporting Role	Jason Piccioni, Justin Ball, Jason Spratt, Tim Jacobsen, David Altenau, Tommy Tran, Mike Kirylo, Matt Lefferts, Donnie Dean (for "Edward Mordrake: Part 2")	Won
2015	67th Primetime Creative Arts Emmy Awards	Outstanding Costumes for a Period/Fantasy Series, Limited Series, or Movie	Lou Eyrich, Elizabeth Macey, Ken van Duyne (for "Monsters Among Us")	Won
2015	67th Primetime Creative Arts Emmy Awards	Outstanding Sound Mixing for a Limited Series or Movie	Bruce Litecky, Joe Earle, Doug Andham, Evan Daum (for "Magical Thinking")	Nominated
2015	67th Primetime Creative Arts Emmy Awards	Outstanding Cinematography for a Limited Series or Movie	Michael Goi (for "Monsters Among Us")	Nominated
2015	67th Primetime Creative Arts Emmy Awards	Outstanding Sound Editing for a Limited Series, Movie, or Special	Gary Megregian, Timothy A. Cleveland, Paul Diller, Steve M. Stuhr, Lance Wiseman, Jason Krane, John Green, David Klotz, Noel Vought (for "Curtain Call")	Nominated
2015	67th Primetime Creative Arts Emmy Awards	Outstanding Casting for a Limited Series, Movie or Special	Robert J. Ulrich, Eric Dawson, Meagan Lewis	Nominated
2015	67th Primetime Creative Arts Emmy Awards	Outstanding Prosthetic Makeup for a Series, Limited Series, Movie, or Special	Eryn Krueger Mekash, Michael Mekash, David L. Anderson, Justin Raleigh, Christopher Nelson, Kim Ayers, Luis Garcia, James MacKinnon	Won
2015	67th Primetime Creative Arts Emmy Awards	Outstanding Music Composition for a Limited Series, Movie Or Special (Original Dramatic Score)	Mac Quayle (for "Orphans")	Nominated
2015	67th Primetime Creative Arts Emmy Awards	Outstanding Make-up for a Limited Series or Movie (Non-prosthetic)	Eryn Krueger Mekash, Kim Ayers, Lucy O'Reilly, Michael Mekash, Christopher Nelson, Jillian Erickson	Won
2015	67th Primetime Creative Arts Emmy Awards	Outstanding Short-Format Nonfiction Program	"American Horror Story: Extra-Ordinary Artists"	Nominated
2015	19th Online Film & TV Association Awards	Best Actress in a Motion Picture or Miniseries	Jessica Lange	Nominated
2015	19th Online Film & TV Association Awards	Best Supporting Actor in a Motion Picture or Miniseries	Michael Chiklis	Nominated
2015	19th Online Film & TV Association Awards	Best Supporting Actor in a Motion Picture or Miniseries	Denis O'Hare	Nominated
2015	19th Online Film & TV Association Awards	Best Supporting Actress in a Motion Picture or Miniseries	Angela Bassett	Nominated
2015	19th Online Film & TV Association Awards	Best Supporting Actress in a Motion Picture or Miniseries	Kathy Bates	Won
2015	19th Online Film & TV Association Awards	Best Supporting Actress in a Motion Picture or Miniseries	Frances Conroy	Nominated
2015	19th Online Film & TV Association Awards	Best Supporting Actress in a Motion Picture or Miniseries	Sarah Paulson	Nominated
2015	19th Online Film & TV Association Awards	Best Miniseries	American Horror Story: Freak Show	Nominated
2015	19th Online Film & TV Association Awards	Best Ensemble in a Motion Picture or Miniseries	American Horror Story: Freak Show	Nominated
2015	19th Online Film & TV Association Awards	Best Direction of a Motion Picture or Miniseries	American Horror Story: Freak Show	Nominated
2015	19th Online Film & TV Association Awards	Best Writing of a Motion Picture or Miniseries	American Horror Story: Freak Show	Nominated
2015	19th Online Film & TV Association Awards	Best Music in a Non-Series	American Horror Story: Freak Show	Nominated
2015	19th Online Film & TV Association Awards	Best Editing in a Non-Series	American Horror Story: Freak Show	Nominated
2015	19th Online Film & TV Association Awards	Best Cinematography in a Non-Series	American Horror Story: Freak Show	Nominated
2015	19th Online Film & TV Association Awards	Best Costume Design in a Non-Series	American Horror Story: Freak Show	Won
2015	19th Online Film & TV Association Awards	Best Makeup/Hairstyling in a Non-Series	American Horror Story: Freak Show	Won
2015	19th Online Film & TV Association Awards	Best Sound in a Non-Series	American Horror Story: Freak Show	Nominated
2015	19th Online Film & TV Association Awards	Best Visual Effects in a Non-Series	American Horror Story: Freak Show	Won
2015	19th Online Film & TV Association Awards	Best New Titles Sequence	American Horror Story: Freak Show	Nominated
2016	31st Artios Awards	TV movie or Mini-Series	Robert J. Ulrich, Eric Dawson, Carol Kritzer, Meagan Lewis (Location Casting), Becky Silverman (Associate)	Nominated
