= Elsa Mars =

Fictional character in horror

- American Horror Story character
- Jessica Lange as Elsa Mars, from the episode "Monsters Among Us" (2014)
- First appearance: "Monsters Among Us" (2014)
- Last appearance: "Is That All There Is?" (2026)
- Created by: Ryan Murphy
- Portrayed by: Jessica Lange

In-universe information
- Alias: Miss Elsa
- Species: Human (formerly); Spirit
- Occupation: Actress (temporarily, later formerly); Owner of and performer at Fräulein Elsa's Cabinet of Curiosities (formerly); Singer and Performer
- Spouse: Michael Beck
- Origin: Germany
- Nationality: German
- Lover: Paul (ex-lover)
- Birth date: Before 1916
- Death: October 31, 1960; Hollywood, California

Fräulein Elsa Mars is a fictional character and protagonist appearing in FX's American Horror Story: Freak Show. She was primarily created by Ryan Murphy and portrayed by Jessica Lange, debuting in the 2014 episode "Monsters Among Us". Often portrayed as a villain by her fictional troupe of freaks, Elsa serves as one of the main characters during the events of Freak Show who tries to introduce her fame to the world of "monsters." She is the fourth original character portrayed by Lange in American Horror Story, and reprised the character in its thirteenth season.

In the fictional universe of American Horror Story, Elsa resides in Jupiter, Florida who runs one of the last surviving freak shows in the country. She recruits unwanted and unusual individuals to join her troupe, including the likes of Ma Petite and Pepper. To gain more attention from the public, Elsa escorts the newly discovered conjoined twins, Bette and Dot Tattler, to Fräulein Elsa's Cabinet of Curiosities where she intends to receive recognition for her singing and general talents. Throughout the events of Freak Show, Elsa Mars is often portrayed as a villain-type figure by her troupe and attempts to become a star by any means necessary, leading her to become a client for a false acting agent, known as Stanley, who attempts to distract her while selling and killing members of her troupe to a local museum. But when she reaches her desired goal in life, Elsa feels incomplete knowing that she betrayed all her friends for fame and popularity.

Elsa Mars reception has been well-received by critics, with praise towards her complex characterization and anti-heroine storyline. Jessica Lange commented on the character herself, claiming Elsa was her favorite character portrayal on American Horror Story, her favorite character in the series, and one of her favorite performances overall.

== Character overview ==
=== Development ===
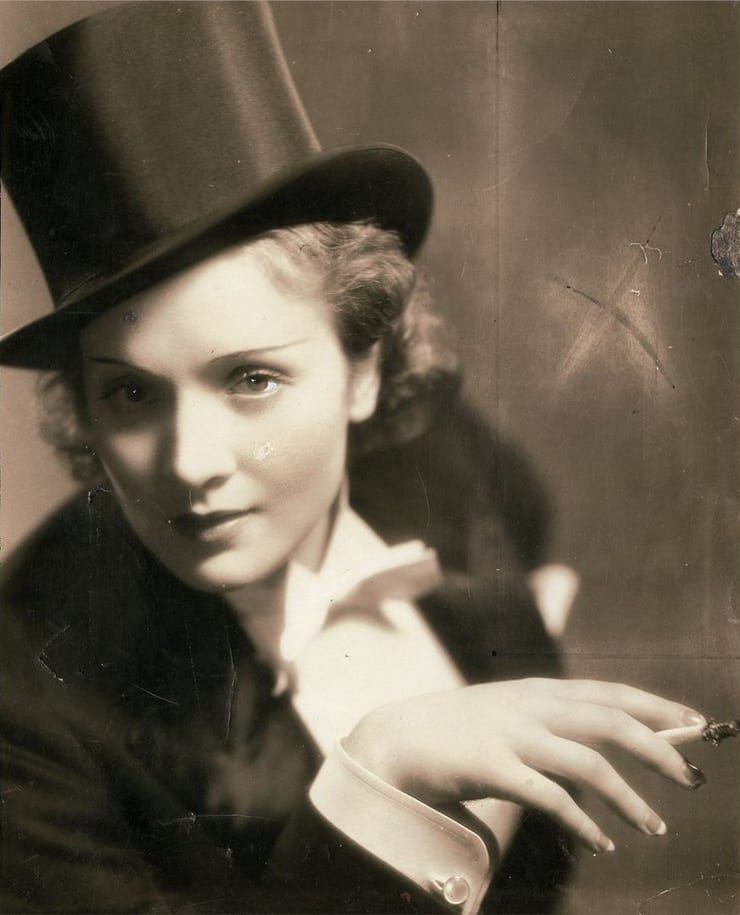
Elsa Mars' style, fashion, and character are widely speculated to be based on Marlene Dietrich — a popular entertainer during World War II.

Ryan Murphy worked with Jessica Lange to research potential characters for season 4. During the process, Murphy was inspired to create Elsa Mars based on Lange's fascination for the carnival world. It has been rumored that Elsa Mars' style, appearance, and character are loosely based on World War II entertainer, Marlene Dietrich. In an interview with The Hollywood Reporter, Murphy claimed that "Jessica Lange has always wanted to play a Marlene Dietrich figure, and now she gets to." David Bowie also served as a minor form of inspiration for the character – with Murphy connecting Elsa's last name "Mars" to Bowie's song "Life on Mars."

Jessica Lange was cast for the role of Elsa Mars before official development of Freak Show began. According to Lange, Ryan Murphy specifically created the character for her, and the two worked on Elsa's characterization shortly thereafter. It was confirmed in 2014 that Elsa Mars would be Lange's last performance on American Horror Story, and that Freak Show would be her last season in the anthology series. However, Lange returned to the series in 2018.

In early 2026, it was announced that Jessica Lange was returning to American Horror Story for the show's thirteenth season, with an undisclosed role. In July, Ryan Murphy revealed that Lange would be reprising all four of her previous characters in an Avengers-like ensemble, including Elsa Mars. The return of the character was confirmed in a trailer for American Horror Story: 13 on 10 September 2026. Murphy also explained that Lange was promised a musical number in 13, later performing the song "Is That All There Is?" as Elsa Mars.

== Character storyline ==
=== American Horror Story: Freak Show ===
After hearing about the conjoined twins at a local hospital, Elsa Mars bribes a volunteer nurse and sneaks into their room. Upon seeing the twins, Bette and Dot, she is left speechless by their appearance. When the twins awake, she tries to convince them to join her troupe of freaks. They initially disagree but eventually come to terms with Elsa after revealing Bette was the one who killed their mother. Elsa later speaks with Jimmy Darling and reveals how she is able to keep her freak show running. After her singing performance some nights later, the Motts confront her and declare they want to buy the conjoined twins from her. Elsa declines each of their offers, which makes Dandy Mott upset. Ethel Darling visits Elsa's tent later that night and shares some kind words with her superior. Upset, Elsa dismisses Ethel and takes off her prosthetic legs. Within the next few days, Elsa recruits two new freaks to join her troupe and is visited by Maggie Esmerelda, who pretends to be a fortune teller to lure Stanley into her home. On Halloween, Elsa accidentally summons Edward Mordrake to the freak show shortly after her performance.

Upon visiting her, Elsa is forced to reveal how she became a "freak" and the loss of her legs. Finding pity, Mordrake selects Elsa as his newest member before quickly changing his mind in favor of Twisty the Clown. The following day, Elsa is greeted by Stanley, who was "predicted" by Maggie to appear in her life and start the career she's always dreamt of. Elsa, at first, declines Stanley's offer of becoming a television personality but changes her mind after being booed off the stage. When it is revealed that Bette and Dot Tattler have vanished and Ma Petite is missing, Ethel blames Elsa. Ethel planned on shooting Elsa dead in her tent but was ultimately killed by her friend after having a knife pierce her skull. Afterward, Stanley convinces Elsa to make Ethel's death look like a suicide. Stanley's actions are eventually thwarted when he is uncovered by Maggie Esmerelda, who reveals to Elsa and the other freaks who were responsible for the death of Ma Petite and the disappearance of Salty.

In a last-minute effort, Stanley hints that Elsa killed Ethel before the troupe captures him. Believing Stanley, the freaks gang up on Elsa and plan to have her killed, but she is able to escape last-minute after being warned by Bette and Dot. Using previous assets, Elsa abandons her freak show, sells it to Dandy Mott, and flees for Hollywood, where she plans on becoming an actress. Within the scope of several years, Elsa marries her husband, Michael Beck, and becomes a popular television star. A few days prior to Halloween, Elsa realizes how undesirable and hopeless her life has become and receives the news that all her friends have been murdered years prior. Her closest ally, Massimo Dolcefino, reveals he has cancer, which causes Elsa to break. With an unstable marriage and realizing her amputation tape is about to go public, Elsa agrees to perform on Halloween night. That Halloween, she is killed by Edward Mordrake and is sent to the afterlife, where she reunites with all her old friends and reconciles with Ethel, who hopefully encourages her to perform. Soon afterwards, Elsa prepares for her performance, walks across the stage, and is welcomed by a full audience and all her friends cheerfully clapping her on.

=== American Horror Story: 13 ===
Elsa Mars appears as the tormented performer of Mr. Nas. Alongside some of her original troupe, including Paul the Illustrated Seal and Legless Suzi, Elsa performs the song "Is That All There Is?" underneath the Apollyon. She is forced by both Nas and Wilhemina Venable to stay on the stage, and introduce the thirteen female sacrifices, described as . Some of the victims include Hypodermic Sally, Mamie Eisenhower, Tuberculosis Karen, and the Black Dahlia. After Elizabeth is sacrificed to Mr. Nas, Elsa leaves the stage in frustration, exclaiming that she no longer wants any part in these events.

== Reception ==
=== Critical reception ===
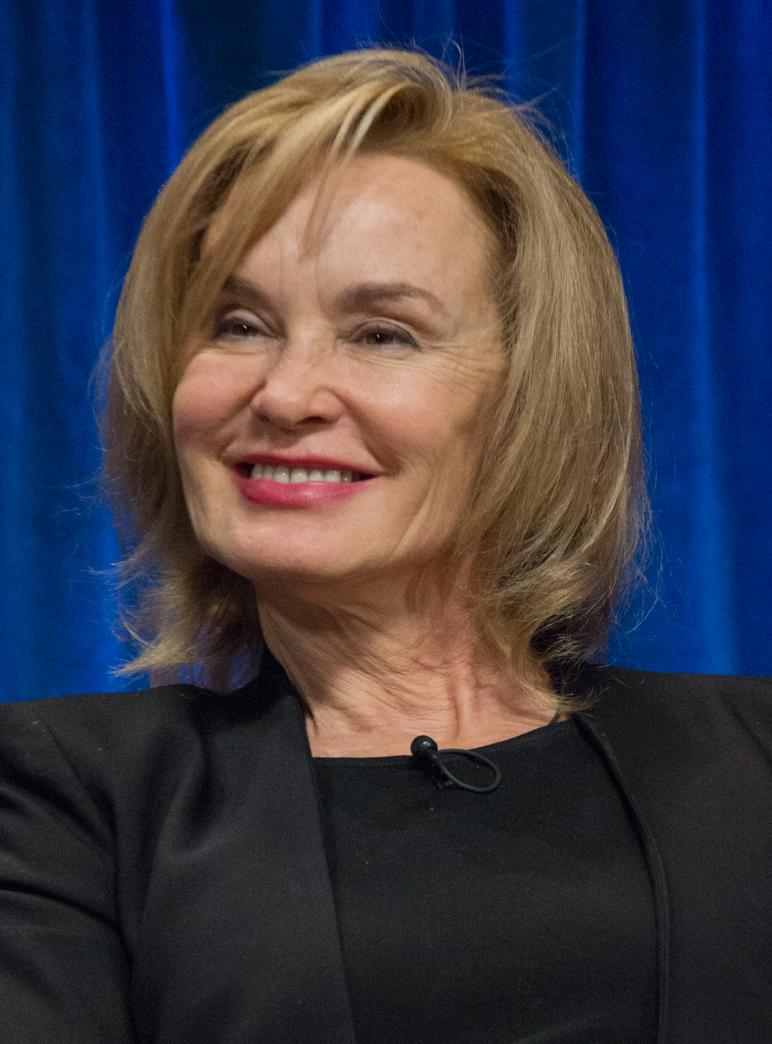
Jessica Lange (pictured) portrayed Elsa Mars in American Horror Story: Freak Show, and has cited the character as one of her favorite performances during her acting career.

The character has been well-received by television critics. Nick Caruso for TV Line ranked Elsa Mars as the 18th best American Horror Story character, stating that "Elsa’s dangerous yearning for fame, along with her shocking secret — that her legs were sawed off during the creation of a snuff film years back — made the character that much more intriguing and mysterious. Considering her horrific past, Elsa was an anti-villain who knew that ‘the show must go on,’ no matter how many bodies dropped or killers lurked around her company. She did care for her beloved ‘freaks,’ though." Alessandra, for The New York Times, mentioned Elsa as one of the show's highlights, writing: "Mostly, each episode is a spilled jewelry case of gorgeous retro design, artful cinematography and most of all, Elsa." Sam Damshenas for Gay Times ranked Elsa Mars as Jessica Lange's worst portrayal on American Horror Story, but still delivering a positive review for both the character and actress.

Critics praised Jessica Lange's performance of David Bowie's "Life on Mars?" during the episode "Monsters Among Us", while singing in a noticeable German accent. The performance is often cited as the character's and Jessica's highlight of the season. She would be nominated for the performance at the 6th Dorian Awards in 2015. With the song being a hit, the cover was released on iTunes shortly after the premiere episode. The character's outfit, worn during the performance, also received critical praise. Lange also sung covers of "September Song", "Gods and Monsters", and "Heroes" during this season, all of which also received positive analysis'.

Her earlier backstory of prostitution and simply, shown throughout several episodes, is considered the weakest part of the character, many critics believing it to be too inappropriate and disturbing.

With the episode "Curtain Call" receiving average reviews, Jack Wilhelmi for Screen Rant complained that Elsa's fate was seemingly too happy and suggested a theory that she is really living a personal Hell-like afterlife, much like what happened to Misty Day and Fiona Goode in the season 3 episode "The Seven Wonders".

==== Accolades and recognition ====
Jessica Lange was nominated for numerous awards for her performance as Elsa Mars, including the "Best Actress — Miniseries or Television Film" at the 2015 Golden Globe Awards.

| Year | Award | Category | Recipient(s) | Result | Ref(s) |
|---|---|---|---|---|---|
| 2014 | Golden Globe Awards | Best Actress – Miniseries or Television Film | Jessica Lange | Nominated | |
| 2015 | 41st People's Choice Awards | Favorite Sci-Fi/Fantasy TV Actress | Jessica Lange | Nominated | |
| 2015 | 6th Dorian Awards | TV Musical Performance of the Year (for "Life on Mars") | Jessica Lange | Nominated | |
| 2015 | 5th Critics' Choice TV Awards | Best Actress in a Movie or Limited Series | Jessica Lange | Nominated | |
| 2015 | 67th Primetime Emmy Awards | Outstanding Lead Actress in a Limited Series or Movie | Jessica Lange | Nominated | |
| 2015 | 19th Online Film & TV Association Awards | Best Actress in a Motion Picture or Miniseries | Jessica Lange | Nominated | |

=== Legacy ===
Elsa Mars is often regarded as one of the most memorable characters of American Horror Story.

Jessica Lange has cited Elsa as one of her favorite character portrayals. In an interview for Cheat Sheet, Lange said "Well, probably my favorite character of the four seasons was Elsa in Freak Show. I just loved her. Again, I didn’t watch it, so I can’t compare the finished product with the other seasons. But the doing of it — there was something magical for me in that season. We were in New Orleans. The set that they built, that rundown carnival freak show with all the roundabouts and the actual actors, the people that came in to play those parts — for me, it was like a long poem." In October 2026 for Entertainment Weekly, Lange still cited Elsa Mars as her favorite character portrayal on American Horror Story, while also citing Freak Show as her favorite season.

In 2015, Funko released Pop! Vinyls of Elsa Mars, with Ma Petite, after Freak Show's run and success.

== See also ==
- List of American Horror Story characters
- List of American Horror Story: Freak Show characters
