= Lee Tergesen =

American actor (born 1965)

- Born: Lee Allen Tergesen; July 8, 1965 (age 61); Ivoryton, Connecticut, US
- Years active: 1980–present
- Spouses: Tanya Lewis (m. 1994; div. 1997); Leslie Howitt (m. 2001; div. 2004); Yuko Otomo (m. 2011)
- Website: leetergesen.com

Lee Allen Tergesen (/ˈtɜːrɡəsən/; born July 8, 1965) is an American actor. He is known for his portrayals of Chett Donnelly on USA Network's Weird Science (1994–1998), Tobias Beecher on HBO's Oz (1997–2003), Peter McMillan on the second season of Desperate Housewives (2006), and Evan Wright in the 2008 miniseries Generation Kill. Tergesen's film credits include Point Break (1991), Wayne's World (1992), Wayne's World 2 (1993), Shaft (2000), Monster (2003), The Forgotten (2004), The Texas Chainsaw Massacre: The Beginning (2006), Red Tails (2012), and The Collection (2012).

== Early life, family and education ==
Lee Allen Tergesen was born in Ivoryton, Connecticut and graduated from Valley Regional High School in nearby Deep River.

He moved to New York City to become an actor. He graduated from the two-year program at American Musical and Dramatic Academy (AMDA) in Manhattan.

== Career ==
From 1986 to 1989, he worked at the Empire Diner. "I wasn't a great waiter. I was funny, but I gave a lot of attitude", he told Rosie magazine in March 2002. He added: "The place is like a vortex for me". He met Tom Fontana, the future creator of Oz, at the diner.

He performed on stage during this time. "I was doing plays all the time, but there's no money in it", Tergesen said in a 1995 Los Angeles Times article. "After graduation, I thought I'd be making a living at it." He went to Los Angeles to help Fontana move into his house. While dining at a restaurant on the day after arriving in LA, a casting director and friend of Fontana's asked Tergesen if he was an actor. "He told me there was a part in this movie and at that time, I couldn't imagine what it could be," Tergesen told the L.A. Times. The movie turned out to be Point Break, starring Keanu Reeves and Patrick Swayze. "It was the beginning of me never having to do anything else but act", he told LT.com in 1990.

Tergesen landed a bit role in the 1991 pilot Acting Sheriff which aired during primetime. He then appeared in Wayne's World (1992) and Wayne's World 2 (1993), in the 1994 series Weird Science as Chester "Chett" Donnelly, and had a recurring role in the first season of Homicide: Life on the Street.

He portrayed Tobias Beecher on HBO's Oz in 1997, a critically acclaimed role he played until the series ended in 2003. His film credits include Shaft, Monster, The Forgotten, The Texas Chainsaw Massacre: The Beginning, Cast a Deadly Spell and Wild Iris. He has made several appearances in TV shows such as ER, Rescue Me, CSI: Crime Scene Investigation, Criminal Minds, The 4400, House, Law & Order and two of its spin-offs, Law & Order: Criminal Intent and Law & Order: Special Victims Unit. He played a murderous Navy SEAL, Andrew Larrick, in Season 2 of The Americans on the FX television network.

He played an Alcoholics Anonymous sponsor in the second season of Desperate Housewives, becoming romantically involved with Bree Van de Kamp. He appeared in the USA Network series Royal Pains and in Seasons 4–5 of the Lifetime series Army Wives. He played Evan Wright in the HBO mini-series Generation Kill.

He has appeared on stage in the Off-Broadway productions of Long Lost (2019) by Donald Margulies and Rapture, Blister, Burn in 2012 at Playwrights Horizons, among others.

== Personal life ==
Tergesen is married to Yuko Otomo, with whom he has a daughter.

== Awards and nominations ==
Year	Association	Category	Nominated work	Result
1997	Online Film & Television Association	Best Drama Series	Homicide: Life on the Street	Nominated
1998	Online Film & Television Association	Best Ensemble in a Cable Series	Oz	Nominated
2002	Bordeaux International Festival of Women in Cinema	Golden Wave for Best Actor	Bark!	Won
2007	Online Film & Television Association	Best Ensemble of a Motion Picture or Miniseries	Bury My Heart at Wounded Knee	Won
2008	Online Film & Television Association	Best Ensemble of a Motion Picture or Miniseries	Generation Kill	Won
2017	Best Shorts Competition	Award of Excellence for Actor Supporting	Norman Pinksi Come Home	Won
2017	IndieFEST Film Awards	Award of Merit for Supporting Actor	Norman Pinski Come Home	Won

== Filmography ==
=== Film ===
Year	Title	Role	Notes
1987	Mind Benders	"Crash" Hopkins	
1991	Point Break	"Rosie"	
1991	Session Man	Neal	Short
1992	Wayne's World	Terry	
1993	Wayne's World 2	Terry	
1997	George B.	Frank	
1999	Inferno	Luke	
2000	Shaft	Detective Luger	
2001	The Boys of Sunset Ridge	Ben Thorpe (age 33)	
2001	Mergers & Acquisitions	Isaac	
2002	Bark!	Peter	
2003	Monster	Vincent Corey	
2004	The Forgotten	Al Petalis	
2005	Extreme Dating	Hack	
2006	The Texas Chainsaw Massacre: The Beginning	Holden	
2008	Pineapple	Bruce	
2010	Helena from the Wedding	Alex Javal	
2011	Silver Tongues	Gerry	
2011	2ND Take	Bobby	
2012	Red Tails	Colonel Jack Tomlinson	
2012	No One Lives	Hoag	
2012	The Collection	Lucello	
2014	Desert Cathedral	Peter Collins	
2015	Tooken	Bryan Millers	
2016	Equity	Randall	
2017	The Yellow Birds	Jim Murphy	
2017	Norman Pinski Come Home	Dr. Vanderwal	Short

=== Television ===
Year	Title	Role	Notes
1990	Law & Order	Clemens	Episode: "Prescription for Death"
1991	The Killing Mind	Ron Donoho	TV film
1991	Acting Sheriff	Robbie	Unsold TV pilot
1991	Cast a Deadly Spell	Larry Willis / Lilly Sirwar	TV film
1993–1997	Homicide: Life on the Street	Chris Thormann	Recurring role (seasons 1, 3, 5)
1994	Up All Night	Chett Donnelly	Episode: "Zapped Again!/H.O.T.S."
1994	Philly Heat	Ivan Loki	TV series
1994–1998	Weird Science	Chester "Chett" Donnelly	Main role
1995	JAG	Gunnery Sergeant Gentry	Episode: "Brig Break"
1996	Hudson Street	Larry Fetchko	Episode: "In the Line of Duty"
1996	Duckman	Chester "Chett" Donnelly (voice)	Episode: "Color of Naught"
1997	Honey, I Shrunk the Kids: The TV Show	Carter	Episode: "Honey, the House Is Trying to Kill Us"
1997	Cracker	Dan Green	Episode: "Sons and Lovers"
1997–2003	Oz	Tobias Beecher	Recurring role (season 1), main (seasons 2–6)
1998	Touched by an Angel	Blake Chapman	Episode: "Lady of the Lake"
1999	Saturday Night Live	Tobias Beecher	Episode: "Jerry Seinfeld/David Bowie"
2000	The Beat	Steve Dorigan	Recurring role
2001	Wild Iris	Lud Van Eppy	TV film
2001	Shot in the Heart	Frank Gilmore Jr.	TV film
2002	Third Watch	Jared McKinley	Episode: "Sex, Lies & Videotape"
2002	Hack	Carl Ginley	Episode: "Pilot"
2002	ER	Demerol Junkie / Mr Mullins	Episode: "Insurrection"
2003	Queens Supreme	Tommy Ryan	Episode: "One Angry Man"
2003	Law & Order: Criminal Intent	Keith Ramsey	Episode: "Baggage"
2004	A Thief of Time	Randall Elliot	TV film
2004	The 4400	Oliver Knox	Episode: "Becoming"
2005	The Exonerated	Walter Rhodes	TV film
2005	CSI: Crime Scene Investigation	Martin Hawkins	Episode: "Compulsion"
2005	Rescue Me	"Sully" Sullivan	Episodes: "Voicemail", "Harmony", "Balls"
2005	Law & Order	Attorney Heller	Episode: "Ghosts"
2005	Wanted	Eddie Drake	Main role
2006	Desperate Housewives	Peter McMillan	Guest role (season 2 & Season 7-ep 17)
2006	The Unit	Alex Deckard	Episode: "Extreme Rendition"
2006	Southern Comfort	"Blue"	TV film
2007	Masters of Horror	Layne	Episode: "We All Scream for Ice Cream"
2007	Law & Order: Criminal Intent	Josh Lemle	Episode: "30"
2007	Bury My Heart at Wounded Knee	Daniel Royer	TV film
2007	Cane	Lamont Samuels	Episode: "Pilot"
2007	A.M.P.E.D.	Brian Spicer	TV film
2008	Generation Kill	Evan 'Scribe' Wright	TV miniseries
2008	Life on Mars	Lee Crocker	Episodes: "The Real Adventures of the Unreal Sam Tyler", "The Man Who Sold the World"
2009	Cupid	Clint	Episode: "The Great Right Hope"
2009	The New Adventures of Old Christine	Todd Watski	Episodes: "Notes on a 7th Grade Scandal", "The Old Maid of Honor"
2009	The Closer	Detective Nick Carey	Episode: "Products of Discovery"
2009	Royal Pains	Zack Kingsley	Episode: "The Honeymoon's Over"
2009	House	Roy	Episode: "Instant Karma"
2009	Criminal Minds	Dale Shrader	Episode: "Retaliation"
2010	Law & Order: Special Victims Unit	Billy Skags	Episode: "Savior"
2010	Lie to Me	Gordon Cook	Episode: "Black and White"
2010–2011	Army Wives	Officer Clayton Boone	Recurring role (seasons 4–5)
2010, 2015	Castle	Marcus Gates	Episodes: "3XK", "Reckoning"
2011	Law & Order: LA	Patrick Denton	Episode: "Big Rock Mesa"
2012	A Gifted Man	Paul Curtis	Episode: "In Case of Letting Go"
2012	The River	Russ Landry	Episodes: "Peaches", "Dr. Emmet Cole"
2012	The Big C	Kirby	Recurring role (season 3)
2013	Red Widow	Mike Tomlin	Main role
2013	Drop Dead Diva	Sid Penar	Episode: "The Real Jane"
2013	Copper	Philomen Keating	Episodes: "I Defy Thee to Forget", "A Morning Song"
2013	Person of Interest	Detective Peterson	Episode: "The Crossing"
2013–2014	Longmire	Ed Gorksi	Recurring role (seasons 1–3)
2014	The Following	Kurt	Episode: "Sacrifice"
2014	The Americans	Andrew Larrick	Recurring role (season 2)
2014	Forever	Hans Koehler	Episode: "Pilot"
2014	The Blacklist	Frank Hyland	Episodes: "Lord Baltimore", "Dr. Linus Creel"
2014	Hawaii Five-0	Gordon Bristol	Episode: "Ka No'eau"
2014	Alpha House	Colonel Eugene Drake	Episodes: "The Contest", "Shelter in Place", "The Nuptials"
2014	American Horror Story: Freak Show	Vince	Episodes: "Bullseye", "Test of Strength", "Blood Bath"
2015	Defiance	General Rahm Tak	Recurring role (season 3)
2016	NCIS: New Orleans	Mike Spar	Episode: "Father's Day"
2016	High Maintenance	Leo	Episode: "Museebat"
2016	The Strain	Tardi	Episodes: "First Born", "Gone But Not Forgotten", "The Battle of Central Park"
2016	Elementary	Cray Fielder	Episode: "Folie a Deux"
2016	Blindspot	Patrick O'Malley	Episode: "Condone Untidiest Thefts"
2016–2017	The Get Down	Inspector Moach	Episodes: "Seek Those Who Fan Your Flames", "Only from Exile Can We Come Home"
2016–2017	Outcast	Blake Morrow	Guest role (seasons 1–2)
2016–2017	Power	Bailey Markham	Episodes: "In My Best Interest", "The Kind of Man You Are", "We're in This Together"
2017	Doubt	Michael Slater	Episode: "Pilot"
2017–2018	Gone	Mel Foster	Recurring role
2018	Jack Ryan	Stanley	Episode: "Black 22"
2018	The Purge	Joe Owens	Main role
2018	Daredevil	Paxton Page	2 episodes
2019	Bull	Prosecutor	Episode: "Into the Mystic" (season 4)
2019	Watchmen	"Mr. Shadow"	Episode: "She Was Killed by Space Junk"
2020	The Plot Against America	Agent Don McCorkle	2 Episodes
2021	Law & Order: Special Victims Unit	Erik Garrison	Episode: "What Can Happen in the Dark"
2022	The Equalizer	Deputy Barnes	Episode: "D.W.B"
2022	A Friend of the Family	Mr. Horstman	Episode: "Son of Perdition"
2024	Blue Bloods	Quinn	Episodes: "Loyalty", "Dropping Bombs", "Fear No Evil"
2024	Tracker	Ashton Shaw, Colter's father	
2025	FBI	Marshal Brad Kimble	Episode: "Unearth"
