= Silver Tongues (film) =

- Film poster
- Directed by: Simon Arthur
- Written by: Simon Arthur
- Produced by: Jared Moshe; Leda Nornang
- Starring: Lee Tergesen; Enid Graham
- Cinematography: Josh Silfen
- Music by: Enis Rotthoff
- Distributed by: Stick Pictures
- Release date: 2011
- Running time: 87 minutes
- Country: United States
- Language: English

Silver Tongues is a 2011 American drama film directed by Simon Arthur and starring Lee Tergesen and Enid Graham.

== Plot ==
Gerry and Joan (Tergesen and Graham) are a middle-aged couple who travel from town to town under false personas to mutilate and change the lives of any and all unsuspecting victims in their paths. Using their immense acting skill, the duo start to fall apart when their relationship strains under the pressure of their performances.

== Cast ==
- Lee Tergesen as Gerry
- Enid Graham as Joan
- Tate Ellington as Alex
- Emily Meade as Rachel
- Adam LeFevre as Police Chief
- Harvey Kaplan as John Roberts
