= Curtain Call (American Horror Story) =

- American Horror Story episode
- Episode no.: Season 4 Episode 13
- Directed by: Bradley Buecker
- Written by: John J. Gray
- Production code: 4ATS13
- Original air date: January 21, 2015
- Running time: 53 minutes

Guest appearances
- Danny Huston as Massimo Dolcefino; Wes Bentley as Edward Mordrake; John Carroll Lynch as Twisty the Clown; Grace Gummer as Penny; Malcolm-Jamal Warner as Angus T. Jefferson; David Burtka as Michael Beck; Chrissy Metz as Barbara

Episode chronology
← Previous "Show Stoppers"	Next → "Checking In"
- American Horror Story: Freak Show

"Curtain Call" is the thirteenth and final episode of the fourth season of the anthology television series American Horror Story, which premiered on January 21, 2015, on the cable network FX. It was written by John J. Gray and directed by Bradley Buecker.

== Plot ==
In a psychotic rage, Dandy massacres the freaks. Jimmy returns and finds everyone but Desiree dead. Dandy kidnaps Bette and Dot, and they agree to marry him. At dinner, Dandy is drugged by Desiree with the help of the twins and Jimmy. Dandy awakens to find himself locked in Hardeen Houdini's Chinese water torture cell with Desiree, Jimmy, Bette, and Dot watch on as he drowns.

Elsa arrives in Hollywood and meets Michael Beck, the Junior vice-president of casting, and they later marry. In 1960, Elsa receives a star on the Hollywood Walk of Fame and is later confronted by her husband and the president of WBN that a copy of the snuff film has surfaced. Realizing that her career is nearly over, Elsa agrees to perform on Halloween, knowing this will summon Edward Mordrake. As Elsa performs, Desiree, now with a family of her own, is shown watching the broadcast, along with a pregnant Bette and Dot, who are happily married to Jimmy. Mordrake and his coterie appear and take Elsa to the afterlife, and she is greeted by Ma Petite and all her other deceased freaks, including Ethel, who welcomes her back.

== Reception ==
The episode was watched by 3.27 million viewers, a significant increase in viewership from the previous episode.

On review aggregator website Rotten Tomatoes, the episode has an approval rating of 54% based on 13 reviews. The critical consensus reads: "The finale offers a lukewarm conclusion to an uneven season of American Horror Story, but all the stories of our cherished "freaks" eventually synced together into a relatively satisfying button ending."
