= Celia Weston =

American actress (born 1951)

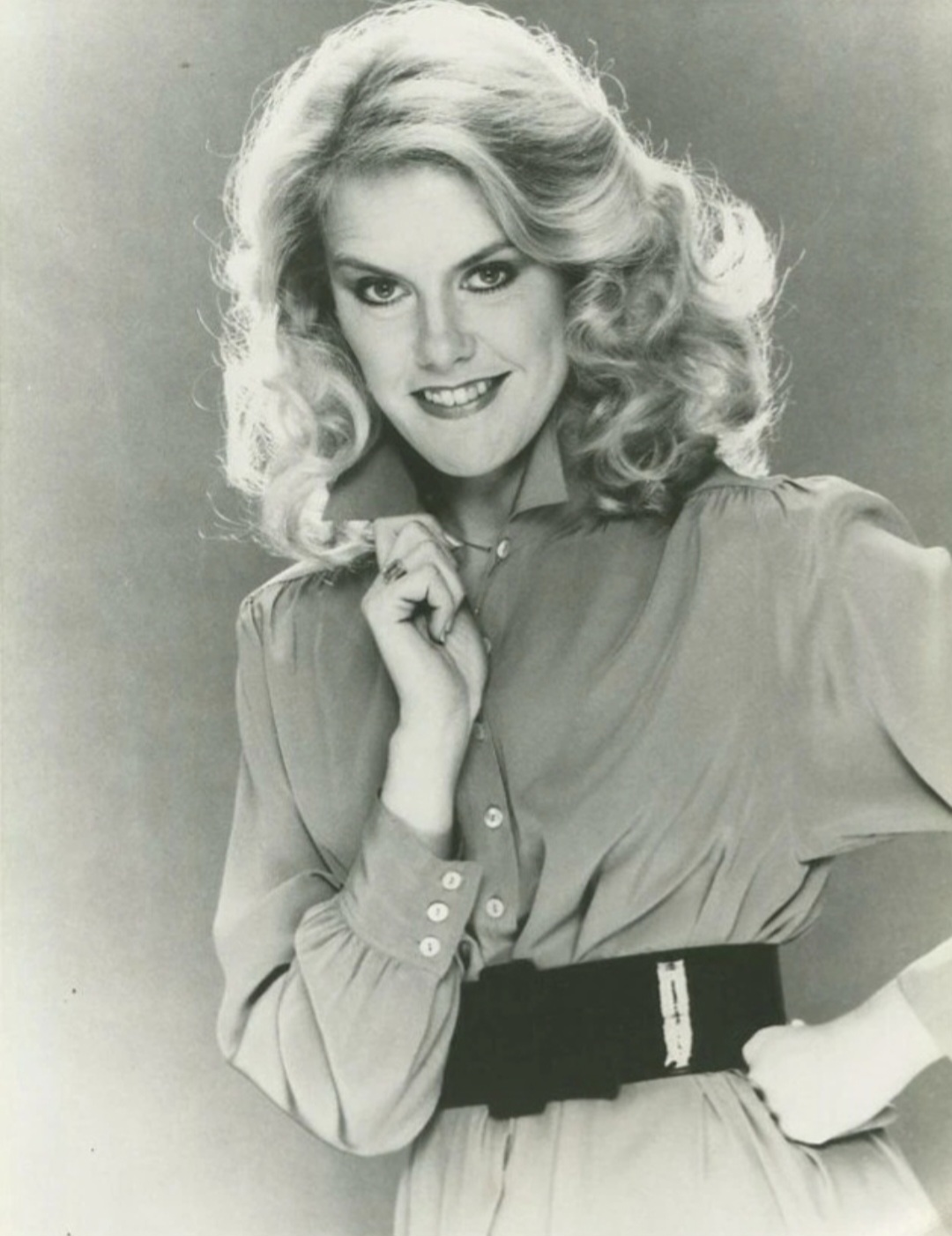
- Weston in Alice, 1981
- Born: December 14, 1951 (age 74); Spartanburg, South Carolina, U.S.
- Education: Salem College; University of North Carolina School of the Arts (BFA)
- Occupation: Actress
- Years active: 1979–present
- Known for: Alice; The Last Night of Ballyhoo; Dead Man Walking

Celia Weston (born Celia Watson; December 14, 1951) is an American character actress. Weston received an Independent Spirit Award nomination for her performance in Dead Man Walking (1995), and also had supporting roles in more than 40 movies, including The Talented Mr. Ripley (1999), In the Bedroom (2001), Hulk (2003), How to Lose a Guy in 10 Days (2003), and The Village (2004). On television, she is best known for her role as Jolene Hunnicutt in the CBS sitcom Alice (1981–1985).

== Early years ==
Weston was born in Spartanburg, South Carolina on December 14, 1951. She was born Celia Watson, but changed her professional name to Weston because a British actress was already using Celia Watson professionally. She attended high school at the Spartanburg Day School, graduating in 1966. She is a graduate of Salem College in Winston-Salem, North Carolina and the University of North Carolina School of the Arts.

== Career ==
Weston began her career on stage, making her Broadway debut in 1979. After a recurring role on the ABC daytime soap opera Ryan's Hope, she joined the cast of the CBS sitcom Alice as Jolene Hunnicutt until the series ended in 1985. She's the only surviving cast member. Weston later said that her role in Alice hindered her film career. Although she had initially rejected the role, she admitted that "the money became so phenomenal that I just had to do it." In later years, Weston acted in independent films and stage productions. She was nominated for the Independent Spirit Award for Best Supporting Female for her role as Mary Beth Percy in the 1995 crime drama film, Dead Man Walking opposite Susan Sarandon. She also received a Tony Award nomination for her performance in the comedy The Last Night of Ballyhoo (1997).

Weston has had many supporting roles in films throughout her career. In the 2000s she had guest starring roles on Law & Order: Special Victims Unit, Frasier and Desperate Housewives. From 2010 to 2011 she co-starred alongside Jason Lee and Alfre Woodard in the TNT comedy-drama, Memphis Beat. She later had recurring roles on Modern Family, as Cameron Tucker's mother, and American Horror Story: Freak Show.

== Filmography ==
=== Film ===
Year	Title	Role	Notes
1981	Honky Tonk Freeway	Grace	
1989	Lost Angels	Felicia Doolan Marks	
1991	Little Man Tate	Miss Nimvel	
1995	Dead Man Walking	Mary Beth Percy	Nominated—Independent Spirit Award for Best Supporting Female
1995	Unstrung Heroes	Amelia	
1996	Flirting with Disaster	Valerie Swaney	
1998	Celebrity	Dee Bartholemew	
1999	The Talented Mr. Ripley	Aunt Joan	
1999	Snow Falling on Cedars	Etta Heine	
1999	Ride with the Devil	Mrs. Clark	
1999	Getting to Know You	Bottle Lady	
2000	Hanging Up	Madge Turner	
2001	K-PAX	Doris Archer	
2001	Hearts in Atlantis	Alana Files	
2001	In the Bedroom	Katie Grinnel	Nominated—Screen Actors Guild Award for Outstanding Performance by a Cast in a Motion Picture
2002	Far from Heaven	Mona Lauder	
2002	Igby Goes Down	Bunny	
2003	Runaway Jury	Mrs. Brandt	
2003	Hulk	Mrs. Krensler	
2003	How to Lose a Guy in 10 Days	Glenda	
2004	The Village	Vivian Percy	
2004	Resurrection	Mother	Short film
2005	Junebug	Peg	
2007	No Reservations	Mrs. Peterson	
2007	The Invasion	Mrs. Belicec	
2007	Joshua	Hazel Cairn	
2009	After.Life	Beatrice Taylor	
2009	The Box	Lana Burns	
2009	Observe and Report	Mom	
2010	The Extra Man	Meredith Lagerfeld	
2010	Knight and Day	Molly Knight	
2010	Happy Tears	Neighbor	
2011	Demoted	Jane	
2014	Goodbye to All That	Joan	
2014	Adult Beginners	Joy	
2015	The Intern	Doris	
2016	The Disappointments Room	Marti Morrinson	
2016	In the Radiant City	Susan Yurley	
2017	Freak Show	Florence	
2019	Poms	Vicki	
2020	Adam	Arlene	
2020	The Secret: Dare to Dream	Bobby	
2023	A Little Prayer	Venida	
2025	You're Cordially Invited	Flora	

=== Television ===
Year	Title	Role	Notes
1980	Ryan's Hope	Gloria D'Angelo	2 episodes
1981–1985	Alice	Jolene Hunnicut	90 episodes
1999	ER	Nurse Practitioner	Episode: "Middle of Nowhere"
2001	Law & Order: Special Victims Unit	Margaret Talmadge	Episode: "Stolen"
2003	Out of Order	Carrie	6 episodes
2004	Frasier	Sue	Episode: "The Detour"
2005	Law & Order: Criminal Intent	Joanne Dexler	Episode: "Beast"
2008	Desperate Housewives	Adele Delfino	Episode: "Mother Said"
2010–2011	Memphis Beat	Paula Ann Hendricks	16 episodes
2010–2016	Modern Family	Barbara Tucker	5 episodes
2013	Under The Dome	Mrs. Moore	Episode: "Outbreak"
2014	Psych	Mrs. Trout	Episode: "S.E.I.Z.E. the Day"
2014–2015	American Horror Story: Freak Show	Lillian Hemmings	5 episodes
2016	Vice Principals	Mrs. Libby	2 episodes
2016	The Blacklist	Lady Ambrosia	Episode: "Lady Ambrosia (No. 77)"
2020	Hunters	Dottie	4 episodes
2020	Bless This Mess	Dolores	2 episodes
2022	The Thing About Pam	Shirley Neumann	2 episodes
2022	Echoes	Georgia Taylor	4 episodes
2025 - 2026	Leanne	Mama Margaret	main role; 11+ episodes

=== Theatre ===
Year	Title	Role	Notes
1979–1980	Loose Ends	Maraya	
1980	The Lady from Dubuque	Lucinda	
1995	Garden District	Mrs. Holly	
1996	Summer and Smoke	Mrs. Bassett	
1997–1998	The Last Night of Ballyhoo	Reba Freitag	Nominated—Drama Desk Award for Outstanding Featured Actress in a Play; Nominated—Tony Award for Best Featured Actress in a Play
2000	True West	Mom	
2017	Marvin's Room	Aunt Ruth	
