= Naomi Grossman =

American actress, writer, and producer

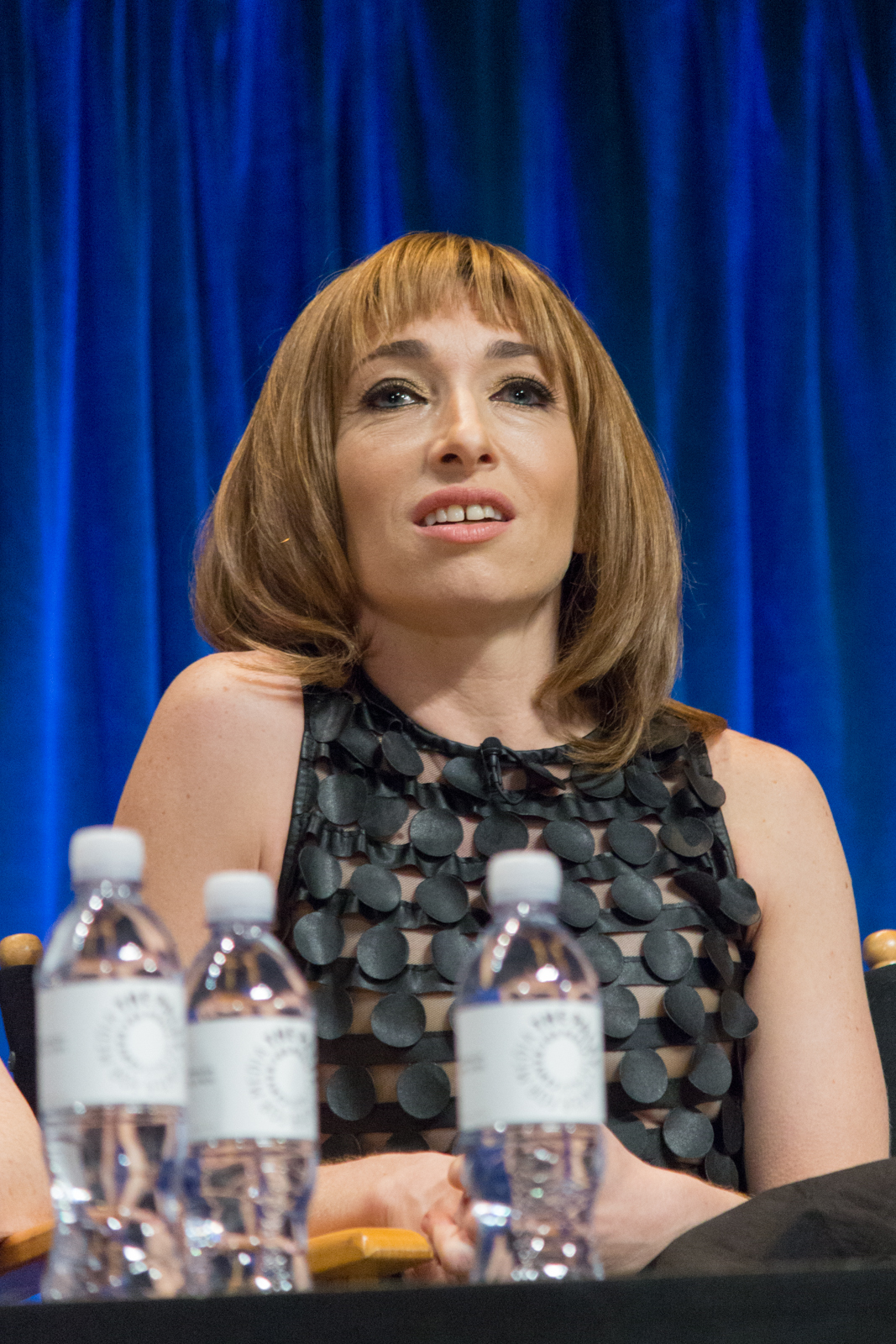
- Grossman at PaleyFest 2013 for American Horror Story: Asylum
- Born: Denver, Colorado, U.S.
- Education: Northwestern University
- Occupations: Actress; writer; producer
- Years active: 1990–present
- Website: www.naomigrossman.net

Naomi Grossman is an American actress, writer, and producer best known for her role as Pepper in the second and fourth season of the FX horror television series American Horror Story.

== Early life ==
Grossman was born in Denver, Colorado. In her early life, she performed in community theatre shows. She received a lot of attention at Ponderosa High School, in Parker, Colorado, at their theatre program. After attending high school, she was a Rotary Youth Exchange Student in Argentina, she attended and graduated from Northwestern University with a theater major, as the only university she applied to. She was a member of improvisational and sketch comedy troupe The Groundlings in Los Angeles, California, and wanted to ultimately perform on Saturday Night Live. When the group cut ties with her, she began teaching the Spanish language and separating herself from her acting career. Grossman writes and produces and has cited Lily Tomlin, Tracey Ullman, Gilda Radner and Carol Burnett as inspirations.

== Career ==
Grossman began her career in 1990 with minor television roles, along with commercial and theatre appearances.

Not knowing what role she was auditioning for, Grossman sent in an audition for American Horror Story: Asylum in mid-2012 and was cast in soon after as Pepper, a woman with microcephaly; the season premiered later that year on October 17. In preparation for the role, she shaved her head bald. In 2014, it was revealed that Grossman would return to the series in its fourth season, American Horror Story: Freak Show, reprising her role as Pepper from the second season, making her the first to play the same role in two different seasons of the show. She spoke of her casting in the fourth season saying that reprising her role was "the last thing from [her] mind" since it had never been done before. She performed her monologue life story focusing on her failed relationships, ""American Whore Story"" at the Edinburgh Fringe in August 2024.

== Filmography ==
=== Film ===
Year	Title	Role	Notes
1999	She's All That	Extra (uncredited)	
2000	Marisa, Where Art Thou?	Wendy	Short film
2005	Over the Shoulder	Goth Girl	Short film
2007	Bubbles	Mama	Short film
2007	Wacky Spoof Commercials	People's Bank Gal 2	Short film
2008	Yes	Bonnie	Short film
2008	Men at Work	Woman	
2009	Represent	Shania	Short film
2009	Table for Three	Actress	
2009	The Hollywood Housesitter	Waitress	Short film
2009	My Boyfriend Is a Blimp	Suzy	Short film
2009	Jesus's Secretary	Mary	Short film
2009	Hot Yoga	Amani	Short film
2009	Food Poisoning	Naomi	Short film
2009	Burka Girls Gone Wild	Unknown	
2010	Random Chapters in the Life of Some Guy	Wife	Short film
2010	Paradrunken Activity	Katie	Short film
2011	Chubduction	Hilary Q.	
2011	Teat the Parents	Girlfriend	Short film
2012	Kev Jumba Dances with the Stars!	Dot	
2012	Touch My Junk	Traveler	Short film
2013	Bakersfield, Earth	Unknown	Short film
2013	Rip	Bella Tiavas	Stylized as #RIP
2014	Just Me and All of You	Katrina	Short film
2016	Fear, Inc.	Cat	
2016	The Chair	Mother	
2017	An Accidental Zombie (Named Ted)	Carrie	
2017	Drifting		Short film
2018	Painkillers	Nurse Sheralyn	
2018	Sleep Away	Mrs. Sturridge	
2018	Short Straw	Jolene	
2019	Bite Me	Chrissy	
2019	The Lurker	Grace Fisher	
2019	1BR	Janice	
2020	The Initiation	Lillian	Filming
2020	Sky Sharks	Natalie Rochefort	
2024	Hauntology	Annalisa Drouais	
2025	Him	Marjorie	

=== Television ===
Year	Title	Role	Notes
1990	Father Dowling Mysteries	Confirmation Kid	Episode: "The Passionate Painter Mystery"
1998	Sabrina, the Teenage Witch	Cheerleader	Episode: "The Pom Pom Incident"
2007	Destination Truth	Herself/Translator	3 episodes
2012	FammGlamm	Gazelda	Episode: "Quality Control"
2012–2013	American Horror Story: Asylum	Pepper	Supporting role; 7 episodes
2014	American Horror Story: Freak Show	Pepper	Supporting role; 10 episodes
2014	Halloween Wars	Herself	Episode: "The Haunted Farm"
2016	Alley Way	Reagan	7 episodes
2016	Point Society	Sojourner	2 episodes
2017	Hell's Kitchen	Herself	Episode: "Leaving It on the Line"
2017–2019	ctrl alt delete	Lorna	Main role
2018	Casual	Tanya	Episode: "All About You"
2018	American Horror Story: Apocalypse	Samantha Crowe	2 episodes
2020	Good Girls	Dr. Amanda Johnson	Episode: "Frere Jacques"
2021	American Horror Stories	Rabid Ruth	Episode: "Drive In"
2022	Painted with Raven	Herself (guest judge)	Episode: "Shock It to Me"
