= Spilt Milk (American Horror Story) =

- American Horror Story episode
- Episode no.: Season 2 Episode 11
- Directed by: Alfonso Gomez-Rejon
- Written by: Brad Falchuk
- Production code: 2ATS11
- Original air date: January 9, 2013
- Running time: 45 minutes

Guest appearances
- Clea DuVall as Wendy Peyser; Britne Oldford as Alma Walker; Barbara Tarbuck as Mother Superior Claudia; Jill Marie Jones as Pandora; Naomi Grossman as Pepper; Kasey Mahaffy as Father James; Matthew John Armstrong as Detective Byers; Joel McKinnon Miller as Detective Connors; Jennifer Holloway as Barb; Vanessa Mizzone as Lois; Mary-Pat Green as Nun; Gwynyth Walsh as Dr. Stevens; Dylan McDermott as Johnny Morgan (uncredited)

Episode chronology
← Previous "The Name Game"	Next → "Continuum"
- American Horror Story: Asylum

"Spilt Milk" is the eleventh episode of the second season of the FX anthology television series American Horror Story. The episode, written by series co-creator Brad Falchuk and directed by Alfonso Gomez-Rejon, aired on January 9, 2013. This episode is rated TV-MA (LSV).

In the episode, Lana (Sarah Paulson) is able to escape the asylum and expose its mistreatments, including those from Dr. Thredson (Zachary Quinto). Kit (Evan Peters) and Grace (Lizzie Brocheré) are allowed to leave the asylum but get a surprise at home. Judy (Jessica Lange) promises Monsignor Howard (Joseph Fiennes) that his and his asylum's downfall are soon to come.

== Plot ==
In 2012, Johnny sits in Dr. Thredson's apartment waiting on a prostitute named Pandora. As she gave birth three weeks prior, Johnny is able to suckle her breast. He attacks Pandora when she jokes he has "mommy issues".

Dr. Thredson gets Kit out of his cell to take him to visit Grace and his newborn child in the dayroom. Kit asks Grace what she remembers of her alien abduction and she recalls the painful process of the baby being put inside her. The baby had grown quickly inside of her as time runs differently for the aliens. Kit believes Alma is dead and he proposes to Grace. Monsignor Timothy Howard takes the baby for adoption.

Mother Superior Claudia sneaks Lana out of Briarcliff. Lana tells Judy that she will come back for her. Thredson notices Lana leaving with his recorded confession.

Lana gives the tape to the police, then goes to Thredson's house. After Thredson points out he's unlikely to receive the death penalty, Lana shoots him dead.

Kit is being released as Thredson is confirmed to be Bloody Face, rather than him. He blackmails the monsignor into returning the baby and releasing Grace. He arrives home with Grace and the baby where he finds Alma with a baby, fathered by Kit.

Lana visits a woman to have an abortion performed. Before the woman even begins, Lana thinks back on all that she has witnessed and stops the procedure, suffering from P.T.S.D. A few months later, Lana takes detectives to retrieve Judy, but Timothy tells them that Judy has committed suicide. However, Judy is actually alive.

Lana gives birth to a boy.

== Production ==
"Spilt Milk" is written by series co-creator Brad Falchuk and directed by Glee veteran Alfonso Gomez-Rejon.

In a January 2013 interview with Entertainment Weekly, series creator Ryan Murphy spoke about Alfonso Gomez-Rejon's direction of the episode, "Alfonso also worked a lot with Martin Scorsese so I think it also felt very Departed to me. I loved it. I thought all the choices were so fresh and so original. I loved the progressions of the characters. I really loved and I think the audience will love seeing Lana be that Hitchcock heroine. I thought the production design was brilliant. It was an episode of happy mistakes because so many things that we wrote and so many locations we wanted weren’t available. Like that mausoleum was a happy accident. It wasn't at all what was written but it was available."

Murphy also commented on the content contained within the episode getting passed by FX's censors, "I have a really good relationship with our people. I find the amazing thing about cable television is you can do any amount of violence you want but you will have hour-long discussions about the shading of nipples. I had it on Nip/Tuck and I had it again on this one where it will be microscopic deep-threaded, analyses of 'I see a shade there. Block that.' The only time I've ever been able to get a nipple on television was when we did Nip/Tuck where the guy got breast implants. At the end of the day, that network trusts its showrunners. There are certain things as a writer and showrunner that I wouldn't show and John Landgraf and I are on the same page about that."

The distinctive piano music melody that plays when Lana Winters is leaving Briarcliff while avoiding Dr. Thredson is one of the main musical themes from the soundtrack of the Clive Barker movie Candyman, and was composed for that film by noted composer Philip Glass. Also American Horror Story creator Ryan Murphy is good friends with Clive Barker and helped each other on Bill Condon's film Gods and Monsters.

== Reception ==
"Spilt Milk" was watched by 2.51 million viewers and received an adult 18–49 rating of 1.5, higher than the previously aired episode.

Rotten Tomatoes reports an 88% approval rating, based on 17 reviews. The critical consensus reads, ""Spilt Milk" offers freshly enticing plots, grossly insane shocks, and an almost-happy resolution." Emily VanDerWerff of The A.V. Club thought the episode "has a lot of stuff going on, but not really much in the way of action or forward plot momentum. It's almost as if the series got to its denouement two episodes early, and now, it's not sure what to do next." She added, "It's still a really odd episode, particularly from Brad Falchuk, who's usually pretty good about bringing things to a crescendo. Instead, "Spilt Milk" moves in odd and jagged ways." Geoff Berkshire of Zap2it stated, "It's great to see the show kicking into first gear and delivering an hour as stylish, thrilling and surprising as "Spilt Milk". Director Alfonso Gomez-Rejon and writer Brad Falchuk really outdid themselves with this one."
