= List of American Horror Story cast members =

The American Horror Story cast changes each season but has included over 57 main actors across 13 seasons so far. Being an anthology series, many actors come and go across the seasons in both new and/or returning roles. Evan Peters and Sarah Paulson have appeared in the most seasons with 10 appearances each. This is closely followed by Lily Rabe and Frances Conroy who have both appeared in 9 seasons. Peters has portrayed the most characters across the show with 16, followed by Paulson who has portrayed 12. Naomi Grossman's character, Pepper, from Asylum was the first to reappear in a different season, Freak Show. Gabourey Sidibe's character, Queenie, who first appeared in Coven was the first character to appear in 4 or more seasons after reappearing in Hotel, Apocalypse, and 13. The series has cast many pop culture celebrities, TV personalities, singers, supermodels, or sports stars including Adam Levine, Stevie Nicks, Patti LaBelle, Lady Gaga, Naomi Campbell, Trixie Mattel, Rick Springfield, Gus Kenworthy, Eureka, Kaia Gerber, Kim Kardashian, and Alex Consani.

== Cast members and characters ==
List indicators

This section includes characters who will appear or have appeared in each season.

- ^{U} indicates an uncredited appearance.
- ^{V} indicates a voice-only role.
- A green cell indicates the actor is a main cast member.
- A red cell indicates the actor is a recurring cast member.
- A light blue cell indicates the actor is a guest or special guest cast member.
- A light gray cell indicates the actor is a co-starring cast member.
- A dark gray cell indicates the actor has not participated in the respective season.

=== Starring ===
| Actor / Actress | Murder House (2011) | Asylum (2012–2013) | Coven (2013–2014) | Freak Show (2014–2015) | Hotel (2015–2016) | Roanoke (2016) | Cult (2017) | Apocalypse (2018) | 1984 (2019) | Double Feature (2021) | NYC (2022) | Delicate (2023–2024) | 13 (2026) |
|---|---|---|---|---|---|---|---|---|---|---|---|---|---|
| Connie Britton | Vivien Harmon | | | | | | | Vivien Harmon | | | | | |
| Dylan McDermott | Dr. Ben Harmon | Johnny Morgan^{U} | | | | | | Dr. Ben Harmon | Bruce | | | | |
| Evan Peters | Tate Langdon | Kit Walker | Kyle Spencer | Jimmy Darling | James Patrick March | Rory Monahan (Note: Rory Monahan is an actor who portrayed Edward Phillipe Mott in My Roanoke Nightmare (a documentary series within the Roanoke season).) | Kai Anderson (Note: Peters' also portrayed Andy Warhol, Marshall Applewhite, David Koresh, Jim Jones, and Jesus in Kai's storytelling, and Charles Manson in Kai's hallucinations.) | Malcolm Gallant Jeff Pfister (Note: Peters also portrayed his character, James Patrick March, from Hotel in episode four and his character, Tate Langdon, from Murder House in episode six of the season.) | | Austin Sommers | | | Kai Anderson Tate Langdon James Patrick March |
| Taissa Farmiga | Violet Harmon | | Zoe Benson | | | Sophie Green | | Zoe Benson (Note: Farmiga also portrayed her character, Violet Harmon, from Murder House in episode six of the season).) | | | | | |
| Denis O'Hare | Larry Harvey | | Otis Spalding Van Wirt (Note: Throughout the Coven season the character was only known as 'Spalding', with his full name retroactively revealed in the first episode of the second season of American Horror Stories.) | Stanley | Liz Taylor | William van Henderson (Note: William van Henderson is an actor who portrayed Dr. Elias Cunningham in My Roanoke Nightmare (a documentary series within the Roanoke season).) | | | | Holden Vaughn | Henry Grant | Dr. Andrew Hill | |
| Jessica Lange | Constance Langdon | Sister Judy "Jude" Martin | Fiona Goode | Elsa Mars | | | | Constance Langdon | | | | | Constance Langdon Fiona Goode (Note: Lange also portrayed her character, Elsa Mars, from Freak Show in episode 4 of the season, as well as Sister Judy "Jude" Martin from Asylum in episode 12 of the season. In addition to these two, Lange also portrayed Margaret Thatcher in episode 4 of the season.) |
| Zachary Quinto | Chad Warwick | Dr. Oliver Thredson | | | | | | | | | Sam Jones | Zachary Quinto (Note: Quinto made a cameo appearance as himself presenting at a fictional version of the Gotham Awards. This marked the first time a cast member has appeared as both characters and self across the series.)^{U} | |
| Joseph Fiennes | | Msgr. Timothy Howard | | | | | | | | | | | |
| Sarah Paulson | Billie Dean Howard | Lana Winters | Cordelia Goode (Note: Prior to Apocalypse, her name was 'Cordelia Foxx' due to her marriage with Hank Foxx.) | Bette and Dot Tattler | Sally McKenna (Note: Paulson also portrayed her character, Billie Dean Howard, from Murder House in episode twelve of the season.) | Audrey Tindall (Note: Audrey Tindall is an actress who portrayed Lily Rabe’s character, Shelby Miller, in My Roanoke Nightmare (a documentary series within the Roanoke season).) (Note: Paulson also portrayed her character, Lana Winters, from Asylum in episode ten of the season.) | Ally Mayfair-Richards (Note: Paulson also portrayed Susan Atkins in Kai's storytelling during episode ten.) | Ms. Wilhemina Venable Cordelia Goode (Note: Paulson also portrayed her character, Billie Dean Howard, from Murder House and Hotel in episode six of the season.) | | Tuberculosis Karen Mamie Eisenhower | | | Cordelia Goode (Note: Paulson also portrayed Ms. Wilhemina Venable from Apocalypse in episodes 3 and 4 of the season. She also reprised the following characters in episode 4: Sally McKenna from Hotel, Tuberculosis Karen from Red Tide, and Mamie Eisenhower from Death Valley.) |
| Lily Rabe | Nora Montgomery | Sister Mary Eunice McKee | Misty Day | Sister Mary Eunice McKee | Aileen Wuornos | Shelby Miller | | Misty Day | Lavinia Richter | Doris Gardner Amelia Earhart | | | |
| Lizzie Brocheré | | Grace Bertrand | | | | | | | | | | | |
| James Cromwell | | Dr. Arthur Arden | | | | | | | | | | | |
| Frances Conroy | Moira O'Hara | Shachath | Myrtle Snow | Gloria Mott | | Denise Monroe (Note: Denise Monroe is an actress who portrayed Robin Weigert’s character, Mama Polk, in My Roanoke Nightmare (a documentary series within the Roanoke season).) | Bebe Babbitt | Myrtle Snow (Note: Conroy also portrayed her character, Moira O'Hara, from Murder House in episode six of the season.) | | Belle Noir (Note: Sarah Cunningham is the character's real name with Belle Noir used as a pseudonym for her writing.) | | | Myrtle Snow (Note: Credited only in the episodes in which she appears.) |
| Emma Roberts | | | Madison Montgomery | Maggie Esmerelda | | | Serena Belinda | Madison Montgomery | Brooke Thompson | | | Anna Victoria Alcott | Madison Montgomery |
| Kathy Bates | | | Delphine LaLaurie | Ethel Darling | Iris Holloway | Agnes Mary Winstead (Note: Agnes Mary Winstead is an actress who portrayed Thomasin White (The Butcher) in My Roanoke Nightmare (a documentary series within the Roanoke season).) | | Ms. Miriam Mead (Note: Bates also portrayed her character, Delphine LaLaurie, from Coven in episode ten of the season.) | | | | | Delphine LaLaurie (Note: Bates appears in only one episode of season 13 although credited with the main cast in all 13 episodes.) |
| Michael Chiklis | | | | Wendell "Dell" Toledo | | | | | | | | | |
| Finn Wittrock | | | | Dandy Mott | Tristan Duffy Rudolph Valentino | Jether Polk | | | Bobby Richter II | Harry Gardner | | | |
| Angela Bassett | | | Marie Laveau | Desiree Dupree | Ramona Royale | Monet Tumusiime (Note: Monet Tumusiime is an actress who portrayed Adina Porter’s character, Lee Harris, in My Roanoke Nightmare (a documentary series within the Roanoke season).) | | Marie Laveau | | | | | Marie Laveau |
| Wes Bentley | | | | Edward Mordrake | Det. John Lowe | Dylan Conrad (Note: Dylan Conrad is an actor who portrayed Ambrose White in My Roanoke Nightmare (a documentary series within the Roanoke season).) | | | | | | | |
| Matt Bomer | | | | Andy Stiles | Donovan Holloway | Crack'd Narrator^{U}^{V} | | | | | | | |
| Chloë Sevigny | | Shelley | | | Dr. Alex Lowe | | | | | | | | |
| Cheyenne Jackson | | | | | Will Drake | Sidney Aaron James | Dr. Vincent Anderson (Note: Jackson's character sometimes went by the name Dr. Rudy Vincent to hide his surname and association with his brother, Kai Anderson.) | John Henry Moore | | | | | |
| Lady Gaga | | | | | The Countess (Note: The character's birth name is 'Elizabeth Johnson' but as the owner of the Hotel Cortez she is referred to as 'The Countess'.) | Scáthach | | | | | | | |
| Cuba Gooding Jr. | | | | | | Dominic Banks (Note: Dominic Banks is an actor who portrayed André Holland’s character, Matt Miller, in My Roanoke Nightmare (a documentary series within the Roanoke season).) | | | | | | | |
| André Holland | | | | | | Matt Miller | | | | | | | |
| Billie Lourd | | | | | | | Winter Anderson (Note: Lourd also portrayed Linda Kasabian in Kai's storytelling during episode ten.) | Mallory | Montana Duke | Dr. Leslie 'Lark' Feldman | Dr. Hannah Wells | Ashley | Winter Anderson Mallory |
| Alison Pill | | | | | | | Ivy Mayfair-Richards | | | | | | |
| Adina Porter | Sally Freeman | | | | | Lee Harris | Beverly Hope | Dinah Stevens | | Chief Burleson | | | |
| Leslie Grossman | | | | | | | Meadow Wilton (Note: Grossman also portrayed Patricia Krenwinkel in Kai's storytelling during episode ten.) | Coco St. Pierre Vanderbilt | Margaret Booth | Ursula Khan Calico | Barbara Read | Ashleigh | Coco St. Pierre Vanderbilt |
| Cody Fern | | | | | | | | Michael Langdon | Xavier Plympton | Valiant Thor | | | |
| Matthew Morrison | | | | | | | | | Trevor Kirchner | | | | |
| Gus Kenworthy | | | | | | | | | Chet Clancy | | | | |
| John Carroll Lynch | | | | Twisty the Clown | John Wayne Gacy | | Twisty the Clown | | Benjamin Richter | | | | Twisty the Clown |
| Angelica Ross | | | | | | | | | Dr. Donna Chambers (Note: Ross' character was only known as Nurse Rita during promotion, which was revealed to be a stolen identity the character was using throughout the first three episodes of the season.) | The Chemist Theta | | | |
| Zach Villa | | | | | | | | | Richard Ramirez | | | | Richard Ramirez |
| Macaulay Culkin | | | | | | | | | | Mickey | | | |
| Ryan Kiera Armstrong | | | | | | | | | | Alma Gardner | | | |
| Neal McDonough | | | | | | | | | | Dwight Eisenhower | | | |
| Kaia Gerber | | | | | | | | | | Kendall Carr | | | |
| Nico Greetham | | | | | | | | | | Cal Cambon | | | |
| Isaac Cole Powell | | | | | | | | | | Troy Lord | Theo Graves | | |
| Rachel Hilson | | | | | | | | | | Jamie Howard | | | |
| Rebecca Dayan | | | | | | | | | | Maria Wycoff | Alana Delarue | | |
| Russell Tovey | | | | | | | | | | | Det. Patrick Read | | |
| Joe Mantello | | | | | | | | | | | Gino Barelli | | |
| Charlie Carver | | | | | | | | | | | Adam Carpenter | | |
| Sandra Bernhard | | | | | | | | High Priestess Hannah Putt | | | Fran Levinsky | | |
| Patti LuPone | | | Joan Ramsey | | | | | | | | Kathy Pizazz | | |
| Matt Czuchry | | | | | | | | | | | | Dexter Harding Jr. | |
| Kim Kardashian | | | | | | | | | | | | Siobhan Corbyn | |
| Annabelle Dexter-Jones | | | | | | | | | | | | Sonia Shawcross Adeline Harding | |
| Michaela Jaé Rodriguez | | | | | | | | | | | | Nicolette Smith | |
| Cara Delevingne | | | | | | | | | | | | Ivy Ehrenreich | |
| Julie White | | | | | | | | | | | | Ms. Mavis Preecher | |
| Maaz Ali | | | | | | | | | | | | Kamal Aman | |
| Gabourey Sidibe | | | Queenie | Regina Ross | Queenie | | | Queenie | | | | | Queenie |
| Joey Pollari | | | | | | | | | | | | | Ben DeSoto |

=== Special guest stars ===
| Actor / Actress | Murder House (2011) | Asylum (2012–2013) | Coven (2013–2014) | Freak Show (2014–2015) | Hotel (2015–2016) | Roanoke (2016) | Cult (2017) | Apocalypse (2018) | 1984 (2019) | Double Feature (2021) | NYC (2022) | Delicate (2023–2024) | 13 (2026) |
|---|---|---|---|---|---|---|---|---|---|---|---|---|---|
| Kate Mara | Hayden McClaine | | | | | | | | | | | | |
| Eric Stonestreet | Derrick | | | | | | | | | | | | |
| Charles S. Dutton | Detective Granger | | | | | | | | | | | | |
| Ian McShane | | Leigh Emerson | | | | | | | | | | | |
| Danny Huston | | | The Axeman | Massimo Dolcefino Dr. Feinbloom^{V} | | | | | | | | | |
| Stevie Nicks | | | Stevie Nicks | | | | | Stevie Nicks | | | | | |
| Celia Weston | | | | Lillian Hemmings | | | | | | | | | |
| Neil Patrick Harris | | | | Chester Creb | | | | | | | | | |
| Mare Winningham | | | Alicia Spencer | Rita Gayheart | Miss. Hazel Evers | | Sally Keffler | | | | | | |
| Naomi Campbell | | | | | Claudia Bankson | | | | | | | | |
| Billy Eichner | | | | | | | Harrison Wilton (Note: Eichner also portrayed Tex Watson in Kai's storytelling during episode ten of the season.) | Brock Mutt Nutter | | | | | |
| Lena Dunham | | | | | | | Valerie Solanas | | | | | | |

=== Notable recurring, guest, and co-starring ===
| Actor / Actress | Murder House (2011) | Asylum (2012–2013) | Coven (2013–2014) | Freak Show (2014–2015) | Hotel (2015–2016) | Roanoke (2016) | Cult (2017) | Apocalypse (2018) | 1984 (2019) | Double Feature (2021) | NYC (2022) | Delicate (2023–2024) | 13 (2026) |
|---|---|---|---|---|---|---|---|---|---|---|---|---|---|
| Alexandra Breckenridge | Young Moira O'Hara | | Kaylee Rowe | | | | | | | | | | |
| Christine Estabrook | Marcy the Realtor | | | | Marcy the Realtor | | | | | | | | |
| Jamie Brewer | Adelaide Langdon | | Nan | Marjorie the Doll | | | Hedda | Nan | | | | | Adelaide Langdon Nan |
| Ben Woolf | The Infantata | | | Meep the Geek | | | | | | | | | |
| Michael Graziadei | Travis Wanderley | | | | | | | | | | | | |
| Rosa Salazar | Nurse Maria | | | | | | | | | | | | |
| Matt Ross | Dr. Charles Montgomery | | | | Dr. Charles Montgomery | | | | | | | | |
| Eric Close | Hugo Langdon | | | | | | | | | | | | |
| Teddy Sears | Patrick | | | | | | | | | | | | |
| Brando Eaton | Kyle Greenwell | | | | | | | | | | | | |
| Ashley Rickards | Chloe Stapleton | | | | | | | | | | | | |
| Morris Chestnut | Luke Maxcy | | | | | | | | | | | | |
| Rebecca Wisocky | Lorraine Harvey | | | | | | | | | | | | |
| Tanya Clarke | Marla McClaine | | | | | | | | Lorraine Richter | | | | |
| Mena Suvari | Elizabeth Short | | | | | | | Elizabeth Short | | | | | Elizabeth Short |
| Anthony Ruivivar | Miguel Ramos | | | | Richard Ramirez | | | | | | | | |
| Adam Levine | | Leo Morrison | | | | | | | | | | | |
| Jenna Dewan | | Teresa Morrison | | | | | | | | | | | |
| Clea DuVall | | Wendy Peyser | | | | | | | | | | | |
| Mark Consuelos | | Spivey | | | | | | | | | | | |
| Britne Oldford | | Alma Walker | | | | | | | | | | | |
| Fredric Lehne | | Frank McCann | | | | | | | | | | | |
| Robin Weigert | | Cynthia Potter | | | | Mama Polk | | | | Martha Edwards | | | |
| John Aylward | | Father Malachi | | | | | | | | | | | |
| Barbara Tarbuck | | Mother Superior Claudia | | | | | | | | | | | |
| Franka Potente | | Charlotte Brown | | | | | | | | | | | |
| Mark Margolis | | Sam Goodman | | | | | | | | | | | |
| Naomi Grossman | | Pepper | | Pepper | | | | Samantha Crowe | | | | | |
| Robin Bartlett | | Dr. Miranda Crump | Cecily Pembroke | | | | | | | | | | |
| Josh Hamilton | | | Hank Foxx | | | | | | | | | | |
| Christine Ebersole | | | Anna-Leigh Leighton | | | | | | | | | | |
| Alexander Dreymon | | | Luke Ramsey | | | | | | | | | | |
| Riley Voelkel | | | Young Fiona Goode | | | | | | | | | | |
| Leslie Jordan | | | Quentin Fleming | | | Ashley Gilbert (Note: Ashley Gilbert is an actor who portrayed Cricket Marlowe in My Roanoke Nightmare (a fictional documentary series within the Roanoke season).) | | | Courtney | | | | |
| Grace Gummer | | | Millie Bishop | Penny Nelson | | | | | | | | Margaret Alcott | |
| Michael Cristofer | | | Harrison Renard | | | | | | | | | | |
| Mike Colter | | | David Ames | | | | | | | | | | |
| Lance Reddick | | | Papa Legba | | | | | Papa Legba (Note: After being portrayed by Lance Reddick in Coven and Apocalypse, Papa Legba was recast with Orlando Jones in 13.) | | | | | |
| Skyler Samuels | | | | Bonnie Lipton | | | | | | | | | |
| Erika Ervin | | | | Amazon Eve | | | | The Fist | | | | | |
| Jyoti Amge | | | | Ma Petite | | | | | | | | | |
| Mat Fraser | | | | Paul the Illustrated Seal | | | | | | | | | Paul the Illustrated Seal |
| Rose Siggins | | | | Legless Suzi | | | | | | | | | |
| Patti LaBelle | | | | Dora Brown | | | | | | | | | |
| Lee Tergesen | | | | Vince Nelson | | | | | | | | | |
| Heather Langenkamp | | | | Tupperware Party Housewife^{U} | | | | | | | | | |
| Chrissy Metz | | | | Ima Wiggles | | | | | | | | | |
| Malcolm-Jamal Warner | | | | Angus T. Jefferson | | | | | | | | | |
| Angela Sarafyan | | | | Alice | | | | | | | | | |
| David Burtka | | | | Michael Beck | | | | | | | | | |
| Max Greenfield | | | | | Gabriel | | | | | | | | |
| Richard T. Jones | | | | | Det. Andrew Hahn | | | | | | | | |
| Helena Mattsson | | | | | Agnetha | | | | | | | | |
| Mädchen Amick | | | | | Mrs. Ellison | | | | | | | | |
| Seth Gabel | | | | | Jeffrey Dahmer | | | | | | | | Jeffrey Dahmer |
| Darren Criss | | | | | Justin | | | | | | | | |
| Jessica Lu | | | | | Bronwyn | | | | | | | | |
| Charles Melton | | | | | Danny Wu | | | | | | | | |
| Alexandra Daddario | | | | | Natacha Rambova | | | | | | | | |
| Henry G. Sanders | | Willie | | | Mr. Royale | | | | | | | | |
| Josh Braaten | | | | | Douglas Pryor | | | | | | | | |
| Alanna Ubach | | | | | Jo | | | | | | | | |
| Charles Malik Whitfield | | | | | | Noah Davies (Note: Noah Davies is an actor who portrayed Mason Harris in My Roanoke Nightmare (a documentary series within the Roanoke season).) | | | | | | | |
| Colby French | | | | | | Wilson Fisher (Note: Wilson Fisher is an actor who portrayed Officer Connell in My Roanoke Nightmare (a documentary series within the Roanoke season).) | | | | | | | |
| Chaz Bono | | | | | | Brian Wells (Note: Brian Wells is an actor who portrayed Lot Polk in My Roanoke Nightmare (a documentary series within the Roanoke season).) | Gary K. Longstreet | | | | | | |
| John Pyper-Ferguson | | | | | | Billy Ford (Note: Billy Ford is an actor who portrayed Anthony Cage in My Roanoke Nightmare (a documentary series within the Roanoke season).) | | | | | | | |
| Doris Kearns Goodwin | | | | | | Doris Kearns Goodwin (Note: Goodwin portrayed a fictional version of herself in My Roanoke Nightmare (a documentary series within the Roanoke season).) | | | | | | | |
| Jon Bass | | | | | | Milo Briggs | | | | | | | |
| Jacob Artist | | | | | | Todd Connors | | | | | | | |
| Brian Howe | | | | | | DA Mark Phillips | | | | | | | |
| Danielle Macdonald | | | | | | Bristol Windows | | | | | | | |
| Emma Bell | | | | | | Tracy Logan | | | | | | | |
| James Morosini | | | | | | Bob Kinnaman | R.J. | | | | | | |
| Colton Haynes | | | | | | | Det. Jack Samuels | | | | | | |
| Jorge-Luis Pallo | | | | | | | Pedro Morales | | | | | | |
| Zack Ward | | | | | | | Roger | | | | | | |
| Dermot Mulroney | | | | | | | Bob Thompson | | | | | | |
| Laura Allen | | | | | | | Rosie | | | | | | |
| Dot-Marie Jones | | | | | | | Butchy May | | | Trooper Jan Remy | | | |
| Rick Springfield | | | | | | | Pastor Charles | | | | | | |
| Cameron Cowperthwaite | | | | | | | Speed Wagon | | | | | | |
| Joan Collins | | | | | | | | Evie Gallant Bubbles McGee | | | | | |
| Kyle Allen | | | | | | | | Timothy Campbell | | | | | |
| Ash Santos | | | | | | | | Emily Campbell | | | | | |
| Jeffrey Bowyer-Chapman | | | | | | | | Andre Stevens | | | | | |
| Jon Jon Briones | | | | | | | | Ariel Augustus | | | | | |
| Billy Porter | | | | | | | | Behold Chablis | | | | | |
| BD Wong | | | | | | | | Baldwin Pennypacker | | | | | |
| Wayne Pére | | | Mr. Kingery | | | | | Mr. Kingery | | | | | |
| Carlo Rota | | | | | | | | Anton LaVey | | | | | |
| Harriet Sansom Harris | | | | | | | | Madelyn Lurch | | | | | |
| Dominic Burgess | | | | | | | | Phil Devlin | | | | Hamish Moss | |
| DeRon Horton | | | | | | | | | Ray Powell | | | | |
| Orla Brady | | | | | | | | | Dr. Karen Hopple | | | | |
| Lou Taylor Pucci | | | | | | | | | Jonas Shevoore | | | | |
| Tara Karsian | | | | | | | | | Chef Bertie Clifford | | | | |
| Mitch Pileggi | | | | | | | | | Art Sawyer | | | | |
| Don Swayze | | | | | | | | | Ed Gibson | | | | |
| Steven Culp | | | | | | | | | John Thompson | | | | |
| Dreama Walker | | | | | | | | | Nurse Rita | | | | |
| Yvonne Zima | | | | | | | | | Doreen Lioy | | | | |
| Spencer Novich | | | | | | | | | | Vlad | | | |
| Eureka O'Hara | | | | | | | | | | Crystal DeCanter | | | |
| Christopher Stanley | | | | | | | | | | Sherman Adams | | | |
| Craig Sheffer | | | | | | | | | | Richard Nixon | | | |
| Mike Vogel | | | | | | | | | | John F. Kennedy | | | |
| Bryce Johnson | | | | | | | | | | Neil Armstrong | | | |
| Vincent Foster | | | | | Truck Driver | | | | | Henry Kissinger | | | |
| Briana Lane | | | | | | | | | Jess | Dr. Richards | | | |
| Jeff Hiller | | | | | | | | | | | Mr. Gideon Whitely | | |
| Kyle Beltran | | | | | | | | | | | Morris Delgado | | |
| Quei Tann | | | | | | | | | | | Lita Steadman | | |
| Clara McGregor | | | | | | | | | | | KK | | |
| Kal Penn | | | | | | | | | | | Chief of Detectives Mac Marzara | | |
| Hale Appleman | | | | | | | | | | | Daniel Kanowicz | | |
| Gideon Glick | | | | | | | | | | | Cameron Deitrich | | |
| Andy Cohen | | | | | | | | | | | | Andy Cohen | |
| Juliana Canfield | | | | | | | | | | | | Talia Thompson | |
| Tavi Gevinson | | | | | | | | | | | | Cora | |
| Taylor Richardson | | | | | | | | | | | | Babette Eno | |
| Ashlie Atkinson | | | | | | | | | | | | Susan Pratt | |
| Debra Monk | | | | | | | | | | | | Virginia Harding | |
| Sophie von Haselberg | | | | | | | | | | | | Mary I of England | |
| Taylor Schilling | | | | | | | | | | | | Taylor Schilling (Note: Schilling made a cameo appearance as herself presenting at a fictional version of the Golden Globe Awards.)^{U} | |
| Reed Birney | | | | | | | | | | | | Dexter Harding | |
| Hamish Linklater | | | | | | | | | | | | Hamish Linklater (Note: Linklater made a cameo appearance as himself presenting at a fictional version of the Academy Awards.)^{U} | |
| Avantika Vandanapu | | | | | | | | | | | | | Ophelia |
| Madelaine Petsch | | | | | | | | | | | | | Kira |
| Elle Chapman | | | | | | | | | | | | | Ashley |
| Berto Colón | | | | | | | | | | | | | Joe the Doorman |
| Fedor Steer | | | | | | | | | | | | | Satan (Note: Satan uses an alias, Taylor Dorium Nas, which is revealed to be an anagram rearranged to form “I’m Your Lord Satan” in episode 9 of the season.) |
| John Waters | | | | | | | | | | | | | Mr. Phibes |
| Tig Notaro | | | | | | | | | | | | | Mac |
| Paul Anthony Kelly | | | | | | | | | | | | | Young Satan |
| Alex Consani | | | | | | | | | | | | | Morwenna |
| Orlando Jones | | | | | | | | | | | | | Papa Legba (Note: Papa Legba was previously portrayed by Lance Reddick in Coven and Apocalypse.) |
