= Madness Ends =

- American Horror Story episode
- Episode no.: Season 2 Episode 13
- Directed by: Alfonso Gomez-Rejon
- Written by: Tim Minear
- Production code: 2ATS13
- Original air date: January 23, 2013
- Running time: 46 minutes

Guest appearances
- Frances Conroy as The Angel of Death; Camille Chen as April Mayfield; Joan Severance as Marian; Dylan McDermott as Johnny Morgan (uncredited); Adam Levine as Leo Morrison (uncredited/reused footage); Jenna Dewan-Tatum as Teresa Morrison (uncredited/reused footage); Brady Allen as Thomas; Mark Espinoza as Jorge; Callder Griffith as Older Thomas; Nolan Grossas Young Johnny; Brady Hender as Bully; Chandler Kinney as Older Julia; Sal Landi as Detective #2; Thyme Lewis as Dante; Evan Parke as Detective #1; Rod Rowland as Milo; Paul Tei as Ted; Meg Wolf as Neo-Natal Nurse; Sade Kimora Young as Julia

Episode chronology
← Previous "Continuum"	Next → "Bitchcraft"
- American Horror Story: Asylum

"Madness Ends" is the thirteenth and final episode of the second season of the FX anthology television series American Horror Story. The episode, written by executive producer Tim Minear and directed by Alfonso Gomez-Rejon, originally aired on January 23, 2013. This episode is rated TV-MA (LSV).

In the episode, Lana Winters (Sarah Paulson) is interviewed about her career, including shutting down Briarcliff, exposing now-Cardinal Howard (Joseph Fiennes), and the fates of the surviving patients Jude (Jessica Lange) and Kit (Evan Peters). After the interview, she is confronted by Johnny (Dylan McDermott), who intends to kill her.

== Plot ==
=== 2012 ===
Johnny Morgan breaks into the boarded-up asylum, listening to an audiobook called Tales from Briarcliff, written and read by Lana. He imagines her telling him she could not wait to give him up and that he should never have been born. As she relates via audio that Oliver Thredson was an "unspeakable monster", Johnny imagines Thredson telling him that he loved him and that Lana kept them apart.

Then, Leo and Teresa enter the asylum as seen in "Welcome to Briarcliff". They end up at the cell where Johnny waits inside. He puts on the Bloody Face mask, pulls out a machete, and chops off Leo's arm holding the camera-phone.

=== 1971 ===
Lana has become a television investigative reporter. She and her camera crew sneak into the asylum via the tunnel to film Briarcliff Exposed. She plans on rescuing Sister Jude after learning she was still alive. They film in the former kitchen, where an attendant catches them. Lana asks about Jude and imagines rescuing her, when, in reality, Jude had already been released. Lana goes to the office, searching through files scattered on the floor, to find Jude's file. She then goes to Kit Walker's residence after learning he was the one who got Jude out of Briarcliff. He relates to her what happened to Jude after he brought her home.

Kit helped Jude through detox of the asylum medication. She then relapsed into an insane authoritarian and chased his children, Thomas and Julia, with a broom. He tried to send the kids out of the room to protect them, but instead they both led Jude by hand out to the nearby woods. Later, with her mind inexplicably healed, Jude bonds with the family, becoming a surrogate grandmother to the children. Jude is truly happy for the first time in her life. Six months later, Jude suddenly dies due to a kiss from the Angel of Death, which she is finally ready for.

=== 2013 ===
Lana is getting ready for a television interview about her career. The interview is held in her spacious New York City apartment where she lives with her new life-partner, Marian, a famous opera singer who leaves for work. The young interviewer, April Mayfield, wishes to begin by discussing Oliver Thredson, but Lana refuses by saying he has become a "household name" and is undeserving of further mention. They instead discuss Lana's career change from print to television and her exposé of Briarcliff. April praises her for shutting down the asylum, but Lana wished for a different ending to the piece by finding Jude there. Lana momentarily stops the interview and asks for water, which is delivered by a member of the crew – Johnny.

The interview resumes with Lana's exposure of Timothy Howard in the 1970s (he had since been anointed as the Cardinal of New York), with his knowledge of Dr. Arden's experiments and the general mistreatment of the asylum patients. Howard denied the allegations on camera but later kills himself at home by slashing his wrists in a bathtub. April listens as Lana admits to lying in her book about her baby's death as well as certain details about her life and sexual orientation. Lana mentions saving Johnny as a boy from a bully in the 1970s. She chose not to stay in touch with him but often thought about him.

Lana also mentions Kit developing pancreatic cancer in the 1980s, and that one day he just disappeared, never to be seen again. It is shown that Kit was in fact taken from his home by aliens. April ends the interview for the day and she and her crew leave Lana alone in the apartment, but Lana pours two drinks. She knows someone has stayed behind – Johnny. She knew who he was after the police previously showed his picture to her. They were investigating someone breaking into Thredson's former house in Massachusetts, killing the occupants, and living in it. Johnny tells her that he knew she was his mother after she approached him that day on the playground when he was a boy.

His hatred and resentment towards his mother began when he purchased Thredson's taped confession to her online, and Thredson begged Lana not to abort the pregnancy. He puts a gun to her head, but she convinces him that he is not a killer like his father. Feeling the guilt of his crimes, Johnny finally snaps as he lowers the gun and breaks down in tears, admitting that he's hurt everyone in his way. Lana tells him that it's not his fault before turning the gun on him, insisting that it's her fault, and proceeds to shoot him in the head, killing him.

=== 1964 ===
Flashing back to the events of the season premiere, shortly after Lana visited Briarcliff, Sister Jude cautions Lana about her desire to question a killer coming into the asylum. Prior to both of them leaving, Jude states, "If you look in the face of evil, evil's going to look right back at you." Lana simply looks at Jude and smiles. The Virgin Mary statue is seen while Sister Jude smiles and "Dominique" begins playing.

== Production ==
"Madness Ends" is written by executive producer Tim Minear and directed by Alfonso Gomez-Rejon.

In a January 2013 interview with Entertainment Weekly, series co-creator Ryan Murphy spoke about his original vision for the episode, "When I pitched this season, the original final episode was all just going to be Act One. It was gonna be a longer version of that. The original finale was gonna be Sarah Paulson now free, a Jacqueline Susann / Truman Capote type, gets a kick in her conscience from Kit and goes back in and shuts that down. And we were gonna have the whole last hour be a documentary of her doing that. But I think when we were working on that I thought, 'I don't want to see feces smeared people for an hour. It's so grim.' So we abandoned that around Episode 10. We thought, 'Let's give Jude a happy ending. Let's make that one act. But let's really make the last act Paulson vs. "Bloody Face".' So we broke that out early on but kept the original idea. I was thrilled with the changes. I was very thrilled with how emotional it was. Some of that was [FX Network president] John Landgraf who felt very strongly that Kit needed to go back in and get Sister Jude out not for himself but for his children. That dialogue was all sort of John's that I thought was very beautiful. Tim [Minear] did a breath-taking script. It just all came together."

== Reception ==
"Madness Ends" received a 1.3 18–49 ratings share and was watched by 2.29 million viewers in its original American broadcast, slightly lower than the previous episode.

Rotten Tomatoes reports an 88% approval rating, based on 17 reviews. The critical consensus reads, "The unexpectedly subtle "Madness Ends" provides a satisfying ending to Asylum with a twisted sort of empathy and sensitivity, though attempts to underscore its harrowing socio-medical commentary prove unsubstantial." Emily VanDerWerff of The A.V. Club stated, "These last two episodes haven't so radically changed my opinion of American Horror Story as to blind me to its weird storytelling lurches and haphazard character development, but they have increased my belief in what this show is capable of. Where once I saw a goofy lark that could occasionally turn out a fun, twist-laden episode, I now see a show that has ambitions beyond simply trying to make people laugh and/or shriek in equal manner." Matt Fowler of IGN commented, "'Madness Ends' did that unexpected thing of making you realize that you cared about characters you never knew you cared about so much. Not everything about Asylum worked, but this final chapter made me glad I spent quality time with lunatics."
