= I Am Anne Frank (American Horror Story) =

- American Horror Story episodes
- Episode nos.: Season 2 Episodes 4 & 5
- Directed by: Michael Uppendahl (Part 1); Alfonso Gomez-Rejon (Part 2)
- Written by: Jessica Sharzer (Part 1); Brad Falchuk (Part 2)
- Production codes: 2ATS04 (Part 1); 2ATS05 (Part 2)
- Original air dates: November 7, 2012 (Part 1); November 14, 2012 (Part 2)
- Running time: 42 minutes (Part 1); 42 minutes (Part 2)

Guest appearances
- Chloë Sevigny as Shelley; Fredric Lehne as Frank McCann; Britne Oldford as Alma Walker; Joe Egender as Billy; Barbara Tarbuck as Mother Superior Claudia; Matthew John Armstrong as Detective Byers; Joel McKinnon Miller as Detective Connors; Franka Potente as Anne Frank / Charlotte Brown; Mark Margolis as Sam Goodman; David Chisum as Jim Brown

Episode chronology
← Previous "Nor'easter"	Next → "The Origins of Monstrosity"
- American Horror Story: Asylum

"I Am Anne Frank" is a two-part episode, consisting of the fourth and fifth episodes of the second season of the FX anthology television series American Horror Story. The first part aired on November 7, 2012, and the second aired on November 14, 2012. The first part is written by Jessica Sharzer and directed by Michael Uppendahl, and the second part is written by Brad Falchuk and directed by Alfonso Gomez-Rejon. Both episodes are rated TV-MA (LSV).

"Part 2" was nominated for Primetime Emmy Awards in Outstanding Art Direction for a Miniseries or Movie and Outstanding Cinematography for a Miniseries or Movie. The episodes' storylines follow a patient (Franka Potente) admitted to Briarcliff identifying herself as Anne Frank, as well as revealing the identity of the killer known as "Bloody Face". Chloë Sevigny guest stars as Shelley.

== Plot ==
=== Part 1 ===
A woman, identifying herself as Anne Frank, is brought to the Briarcliff asylum, claiming to have survived her imprisonment during the Holocaust and living in anonymity. She attacks Dr. Arden after finding him to be similar as the doctor of the Auschwitz concentration camp: Hans Grüper. Later, suspected serial murderer Kit begins to question his memory in a meeting with Dr. Thredson: although he is suspected to have killed many people, including his wife, he does not remember such events.

Thredson suggests that Lana take aversion therapy to cure her homosexuality. Although initially hesitant, Lana submits to the therapy, which goes badly, and Thredson promises that he will take Lana when his asylum visit is over.

Arden confronts the woman who claims to be Anne Frank, who uses a stolen gun to injure Arden. Upon investigating his laboratory, the woman discovers a disfigured Shelley, who begs Anne to kill her.

=== Part 2 ===
A man named Jim Brown arrives at the asylum claiming "Anne Frank" is his wife Charlotte, who has become obsessed with Anne's story. He takes her home but later returns her after she tries to smother their baby. Dr. Arden suggests Charlotte be lobotomized.

Dr. Thredson asks Kit to record his admission of the murders on tape, claiming this will help Kit remember what really happened, as well as aid any future legal action to permanently commit him and avoid the death penalty. The recording, in conjunction with Thredson's file, is later used in Kit's arrest for the murders.

Jude leaves the asylum after Arden tells her that he is pressing charges against her for allowing a patient to acquire a gun. Arden learns that Mary Eunice had removed the disfigured Shelley from his lab while his wound was being treated at the hospital. Shelley is found in a stairwell near a school playground.

Thredson manages to help Lana escape. At his home, Lana finds a lampshade made from human skin and a secret room with tools and drying skin. Thredson, who is revealed to be Bloody Face, traps Lana next to Wendy's frozen corpse.

At home, Charlotte appears as a normal wife and mother. She has packed away most of the clippings – but a photo shows a young Hans Grüper behind Adolf Hitler.

== Production ==
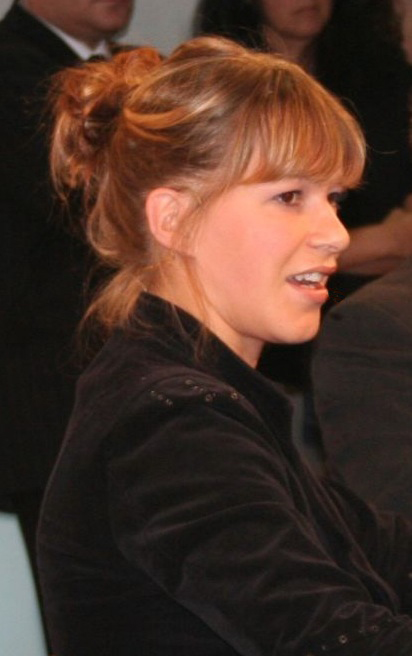
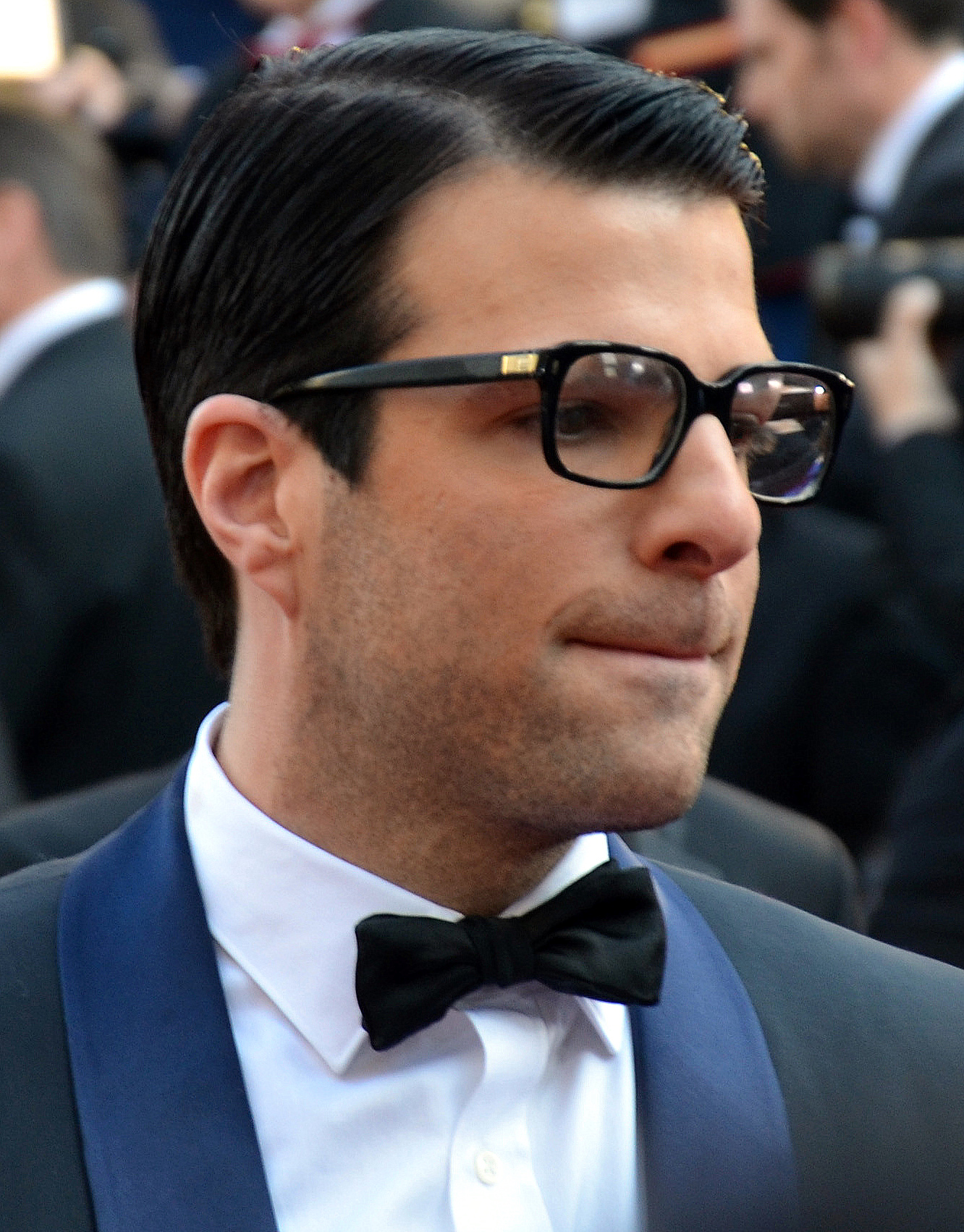
Franka Potente (up) portrays an adult Anne Frank in the episodes and Zachary Quinto (down) portrays Dr. Oliver Thredson.

The first part of "I Am Anne Frank" is written by co-executive producer Jessica Sharzer and directed by Michael Uppendahl, and the second part is written by co-creator Brad Falchuk and directed by Alfonso Gomez-Rejon.

In a November 2012 interview with Entertainment Weekly, series creator Ryan Murphy spoke on several episode topics. Regarding the pace of the two-parter and the rest of the season episodes, he said, "American Horror Story is always about a slow rollout of the season of reveals. The pace of these two is a little slower. The scenes are longer and I think more thoughtful than the pace of the first three. These are two of my favorite episodes in the history of the show. Also, in these episodes, I think we really understand the world a little more and what we're trying to write about which is the horror of the insane asylum back in the '50s and '60s and the degradation and the abuse, the real-life horrors. I think we really hit that in a great way in the Anne Frank story."

Regarding the decision to do an episode about Anne Frank, Murphy said, "We have a great writing staff but I will take credit for that. One of the things we've done on the show is we take historical figures – last year was the Black Dahlia and this year is Anne Frank. The Black Dahlia particularly was a case that was never solved so we solved that case in our way. The Anne Frank thing was always interesting to me because after the war, much like the Anastasia case, there were many women who came forward after that diary and said, 'Well I'm the real Anne Frank,' and they were struck down. Many of them were found to be mentally ill and suffering from schizophrenia, so I read about those cases. Before we even wrote one word of it, I thought there was sort of only one actress I was interested in playing Anne Frank and that was Franka. So I brought her in and said, 'I'm gonna write this for you and would you do it.' And we had no script because we were very early on in the season. She loved the story and I sorta swore her to secrecy and God bless her heart she had like five months without telling anybody. I love how it came together."

Last season, Murphy had spoken with Zachary Quinto about Dr. Oliver Thredson, who was revealed in "Part 2" as being the serial killer Bloody Face. Quinto stated the knowledge "made it all the more fun for me to build the character in a way that made it seem like he was compassionate and supportive and concerned about the welfare of the patients at Briarcliff, but carrying these ulterior motives." He added that Thredson "carries a lot of secrets with him. He's very intelligent. But he's also very experienced at covering those sects and hiding them and maintaining them. There's a plan. He's fiercely intelligent, and obviously ruthless in his willingness to create this world he's making for himself. He's delusional within himself. He's not trying to sell you a story. He's trying to believe it himself. You will learn more in the coming weeks about what motivated him to these horrific crimes."

== Reception ==
"Part 1" was watched by 2.65 million viewers, an increase from the previous episode, and received an adult 18-49 rating of 1.5. "Part 2" was watched by 2.78 million viewers and received a 1.6 rating.

Rotten Tomatoes reports a 91% approval rating for "Part 1", based on 11 reviews. The critical consensus reads, "The pace is quite measured in comparison to previous episodes in the season, but "I Am Anne Frank (Part 1)" ups the stakes in a major way with some earnest and empathic character development." "Part 2" received a 100% approval rating, based on 11 reviews. The critical consensus reads, "Comparatively light on horror, "I Am Anne Frank (Part 2)" is still full of twists and frights, topped with the return of one hair-raising main character." The Huffington Post's Joey DeAngelis stated, "Obviously the first part of "I Am Anne Frank" isn't the finest hour of American Horror Story and didn't really do much to propel the story forward, but damn if it wasn't entertaining." DeAngelis said the second part "hit major high notes, changing the course of the season for the better. It was topped off by a deliciously creepy performance from Zachary Quinto." Amy Amatangelo of Paste called the first part "the strongest [episode] of the season" and stated, "The series stayed away from schlocky clichés in favor of deeper character development and a compelling guest star." However, Amatangelo thought the second part was "incredibly misogynistic", adding, "What separates American Horror Story from an episode of Criminal Minds, really? The show appears to be wallowing in torturing women." IGN's Matt Fowler stated, ""I Am Anne Frank (Part 2)" was a killer episode filled with the right amount of twists and frights, capped off by a perfectly creepy turn by Zachary Quinto."
