= Missy Stone =

Missy Stone may refer to:

- Missy Stone, American actress nominated for two 2009 AVN Awards
- Missy Stone, a supporting character in the American Horror Story: Asylum episode, "Nor'easter"
