= Welcome to Briarcliff =

- American Horror Story episode
- The titular mental institution of Briarcliff Manor in its present condition
- Episode no.: Season 2 Episode 1
- Directed by: Bradley Buecker
- Written by: Tim Minear
- Production code: 2ATS01
- Original air date: October 17, 2012
- Running time: 46 minutes

Guest appearances
- Chloë Sevigny as Shelley; Adam Levine as Leo Morrison; Jenna Dewan-Tatum as Teresa Morrison; Clea DuVall as Wendy Peyser; Mark Consuelos as Spivey; Britne Oldford as Alma Walker; Joe Egender as Billy Marshall

Episode chronology
← Previous "Afterbirth"	Next → "Tricks and Treats"
- American Horror Story: Asylum

"Welcome to Briarcliff" is the first episode of the second season of the anthology television series American Horror Story, which premiered on October 17, 2012, on the cable network FX. In its original airing, the episode was watched by 3.85 million viewers, the largest audience of the franchise thus far, 2.8 million of which were from the 18–49 demographic.

This episode won the Primetime Emmy Award for Outstanding Sound Editing for a Miniseries, Movie or a Special in 2013. It was also nominated for Outstanding Sound Mixing for a Miniseries or a Movie and Outstanding Art Direction for a Miniseries or Movie.

The episode introduces the season's main cast. It follows reporter Lana Winters' (Sarah Paulson) plight to expose Sister Jude's (Jessica Lange) sadistic insane asylum and Kit Walker's (Evan Peters) unjust commitment to the institution. Chloë Sevigny guest stars as Shelley, a patient at the asylum. This episode is rated TV-MA (LSV).

== Plot ==
Flashing forward to 2012, Leo and Teresa, two recently married horror fanatics, visit Briarcliff, an abandoned mental institution. While reaching through a hatch in one of the doors to peek a camera in a room that the couple heard noise in, Leo's arm is severed. Teresa runs to get help, but finds the entryway locked up behind them. When looking for another way out, she discovers a hidden tunnel and encounters one famous serial killer who resided in the asylum, "Bloody Face", wearing a mask of human skin.

In 1964, Kit Walker lives with his African-American wife Alma, in secret. While at home together, a series of explosions, bright lights, loud noises and apparent anti-gravity occur during which Alma disappears and Kit is rendered unconscious. He is supposedly kidnapped and operated on by aliens.

Lana Winters, an ambitious journalist tired of fluff stories given to her by her paper, goes on her own to Briarcliff Sanitarium to report on the commitment of serial killer "Bloody Face". Sister Jude Martin, the asylum's authoritarian administrator, does not take a liking to Lana or her questioning. Unknown to anyone, Jude harbors sexual feelings for the sanitarium's founder, Monsignor Timothy Howard, who is an ambitious priest aiming to become Pope. At the sanitarium, the alleged murderer is Kit, accused of skinning three women – including Alma – alive. He is being held pending determination if he is sane enough to stand trial. Kit denies ever killing anyone, blaming Alma's disappearance instead on extra-terrestrials, which Jude does not believe.

Kit later encounters other inmates, including Shelley, a nymphomaniac, and Grace, a seemingly sane patient committed for allegedly killing and cutting up her family. Spivey, a bully in the asylum, picks a fight with Kit. Jude breaks up the fight, and the guards drag Kit to solitary confinement.

Jude has a conversation with the institution's physician, Dr. Arden. She wonders why some patients who had died under mysterious circumstances all had no family or friends and asks what had become of their bodies, to which Arden contends that they all were cremated. Later, Dr. Arden secretly sedates Kit and, back in his lab, cuts Kit's neck when he finds a hard mass, extracting a metallic object that grows legs and flees while Kit has apparent flashbacks to alien abduction.

Sister Mary Eunice is sent by Dr. Arden to feed something in the woods. Lana encounters her there and joins her as she flees back through the secret tunnel. While sneaking around the asylum, Lana is attacked by something in one of the isolation rooms. Upon waking, she is locked in a sanitarium room as its newest patient. She learns from Jude that she visited Lana's lesbian partner, Wendy, and by threatening to out both Wendy and Lana, Jude has Wendy sign papers committing Lana to the asylum.

== Reception ==
The second season's premiere gained a 2.2 18–49 ratings share and was watched by 3.85 million viewers.

"Welcome to Briarcliff" received generally positive reviews from critics and scored 64 out of 100 on Metacritic based on 22 reviews. Rotten Tomatoes reports a 100% approval rating, based on 11 reviews. The critical consensus reads, "American Horror Story ushers in a new season as is to be expected: with a healthy dose of mysterious, gruesome fun." James Poniewozik from Time stated, "AHS: Asylum feels like a more focused, if equally frenetic, screamfest. It's also gorgeously realized, with a vision of its '60s institution setting so detailed you can smell the stale air and incense."

Maureen Ryan of The Huffington Post said, "It's to the credit of Asylum's writers, directors and cast that the emotional pain of the characters often feels as real as their uncertainty and terror." Verne Gay from Newsday gave the season a C grade, stating it "has some good special effects, just not much of a story to hang them on." However, Linda Stasi of the New York Post thought the season was "over the top", adding, "I need to enter [an asylum] myself after two hours of this craziness."

In February 2013, "Welcome to Briarcliff" won a Golden Reel Award for Best Sound Editing: Short Form Sound Effects and Foley in Television by the Motion Picture Sound Editors society. In September 2013, the episode won a Creative Arts Emmy Award for Outstanding Sound Editing for a Miniseries, Movie, or Special.
