= Continuum (American Horror Story) =

- American Horror Story episode
- Episode no.: Season 2 Episode 12
- Directed by: Craig Zisk
- Written by: Ryan Murphy
- Production code: 2ATS12
- Original air date: January 16, 2013
- Running time: 43 minutes

Guest appearances
- Frances Conroy as The Angel of Death; Clea DuVall as Wendy Peyser; Britne Oldford as Alma Walker; Robin Bartlett as Dr. Miranda Crump; Naomi Grossman as Pepper; Jack Conley as Officer Woods; Lorinne Vozoff as Bookstore Owner; Deirdre Lovejoy as Bookstore Owner; Elizabeth Bond as Rena; Dylan McDermott as Johnny Morgan (uncredited)

Episode chronology
| ← Previous "Spilt Milk" | Next → "Madness Ends" |
- American Horror Story: Asylum

"Continuum" is the twelfth and penultimate episode of the second season of the FX anthology television series American Horror Story. The episode, written by series co-creator Ryan Murphy and directed by Craig Zisk, originally aired on January 16, 2013. This episode is rated TV-MA (LSV).

In the episode, Kit (Evan Peters) must deal with both Alma (Britne Oldford) and Grace (Lizzie Brocheré) at home. Sister Jude (Jessica Lange), now known as "Betty Drake", slips further into insanity at the asylum. Lana (Sarah Paulson) publishes a book about her ordeal, even though it may not all be true. Johnny (Dylan McDermott) seeks out a copy of the book to continue his father's "work".

== Plot ==
Kit is living with both Alma and Grace (though polygamy is illegal) and his two children, one from each wife. Kit tries to comfort Alma's fear that the aliens might return, while Grace would welcome such an event. As Kit and Grace discuss this, Alma abruptly kills Grace with an axe, stating she had to stop her.

At the asylum, Judy is now known as "Betty Drake" to hide her identity and faked death. Monsignor Timothy Howard tells her that he is leaving to be Cardinal of New York and that the asylum has been donated to the state, and promises Jude he will get her out. Inmates from the local prison overflow will now be brought into the asylum. Jude hallucinates her roommate is Shachath, until she sees Dr. Miranda Crump, the asylum administrator. Crump tells Jude that she has gone through five different roommates in two months. Crump also informs her that it has been two years since Timothy left, having reneged on his promise, and that Pepper died in 1966.

Lana publishes Maniac, One Woman's Story of Survival, a best-selling book about the events that happened to her. What she has written contains fabricated events, however, and at a reading she is haunted by visions of Thredson and Wendy, who confront her about her lies. Kit arrives to complain that she has failed to get Briarcliff shut down. He informs her that Alma had been admitted there, but has died. Kit tells her that Judy is still alive, as he has spoken to her, although she is becoming insane. He hopes the news about Judy will reinvigorate Lana's desire to shut down Briarcliff, but she claims Judy has brought her current situation on to herself.

In the 2010s, Johnny gets an autographed copy of Maniac, telling the bookstore owner his plans for Lana, his mother: he will take the book, track her down, make her realize that he is her son, proving to her that he is alive, and then kill her, thus completing his father, Oliver Thredson's work.

== Production ==
"Continuum" is written by series co-creator Ryan Murphy and directed by Craig Zisk.

In a January 2013 interview with Entertainment Weekly, Murphy spoke about formatting the three leads' stories for the episode, "I think we just wanted to spend our time with resolving a lot of those stories. I think it was interesting because a lot of those people had never been together. We've never had Alma and Grace and Kit all together. I think the idea was just to spend a good chunk of time with them and see what that relationship was like which was very interesting with all the progressive, free-love, civil rights stuff so that was one thing."

He continued, "I love the idea of showing Jude's descent. We wrote it and directed and shot it much like one of those '1950s ladies in prison' movies which I was always obsessed with. As a child I was obsessed with this movie called Caged which was like tough broads standing against James Cagney.^{1} I was really thrilled with Frances Conroy's brilliant lady gangster interpretation. She was so brilliant and I loved her henchwoman and I loved the whole idea that Jude thought that woman is death. And I love the actress who plays the new ward of Briarcliff, Robin Bartlett, who's in one of my favorite Mike Nichols movies Heartburn."^{2}

Finally, he added, "All of that Lana stuff was really modeled after Truman Capote and his complete In Cold Blood fame grab. Lana has sorta become Truman Capote meets Jacqueline Susann. I thought it was just fascinating and moving and totally understandable that after all the horrors Lana took refuge and solace in fame and money and celebrity and glamour. I really understood that for her. Then I love how they all dovetailed."

Featured media in episode:

- President Lyndon B. Johnson's televised announcement of Martin Luther King Jr.'s assassination
- Televised episode of The Flying Nun

== Reception ==
"Continuum" was watched by 2.30 million viewers and received an adult 18-49 rating of 1.3, slightly lower than the previously aired episode.

Rotten Tomatoes reports a 69% approval rating, based on 16 reviews. The critical consensus reads, "Penultimate episode "Continuum" forces wrap-ups of too many open-ended arcs, though it still manages to entertain by throwing more wrenches into the mix." Emily VanDerWerff of The A.V. Club thought the episode "embrace[d] all that's wondrous and all that's awful about this season of American Horror Story, occasionally within the same scene or line of dialogue." She added, "This is a horribly messy piece of work that somehow gets to the heart of madness, and it's occasionally a starkly beautiful piece about survivor's guilt." About the episode, Matt Fowler of IGN stated, "Not that anything was overtly awful, but the pacing was such that you could just never get a hold on what was going on." He added, "I also don't want to fully penalize a show for pulling out all the stops and taking me on a completely unexpected journey."

== Notes ==
- ^1 James Cagney was not in Caged.
- ^2 Robin Bartlett was in Nichols' Postcards from the Edge, not Heartburn.
