= American Horror Story: Asylum =

Second season of American Horror Story

- Season 2
- Promotional poster and home media cover art
- Showrunner: Ryan Murphy
- Starring: Zachary Quinto; Joseph Fiennes; Sarah Paulson; Evan Peters; Lily Rabe; Lizzie Brocheré; James Cromwell; Jessica Lange
- No. of episodes: 13

Release
- Original network: FX
- Original release: October 17, 2012 – January 23, 2013

Season chronology
- ← Previous; Murder House Next → Coven

The second season of the American horror anthology television series American Horror Story, subtitled Asylum, takes place in 1964 and follows the stories of the staff and inmates who occupy the fictional mental institution Briarcliff Manor, and intercuts with events in the past and present. The ensemble cast includes Zachary Quinto, Joseph Fiennes, Sarah Paulson, Evan Peters, Lily Rabe, Lizzie Brocheré, James Cromwell, and Jessica Lange, with all returning from the first season, except newcomers Fiennes, Brocheré, and Cromwell.

Created by Ryan Murphy and Brad Falchuk for the cable network FX, the series is produced by 20th Century Fox Television. Asylum was broadcast between October 17, 2012, to January 23, 2013, consisting of 13 episodes and attracting high ratings success for the network. Like its predecessor, the second season was well received by television critics, particularly for the performances of Lange, Cromwell, Quinto, Paulson, Peters and Rabe. As a result, the season garnered seventeen Primetime Emmy Award nominations, more than any other show, including Outstanding Miniseries or Movie, and four acting nominations for Lange, Paulson, Cromwell, and Quinto, with Cromwell winning for Outstanding Supporting Actor in a Miniseries or a Movie. In addition, Quinto and Paulson won their respective supporting categories at the 3rd Critics' Choice Television Awards.

== Cast and characters ==
=== Main ===
Asylum main cast

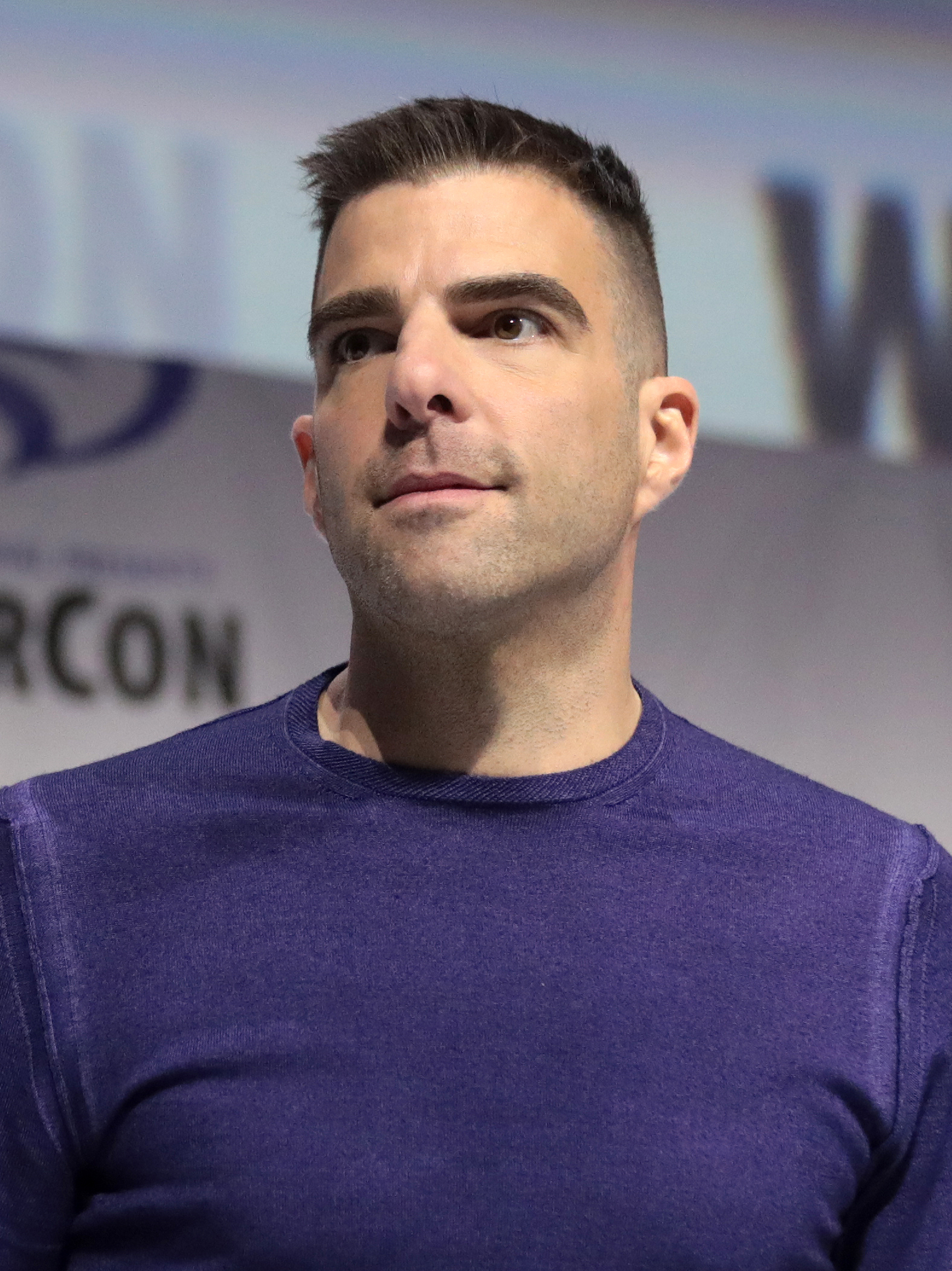
Zachary Quinto

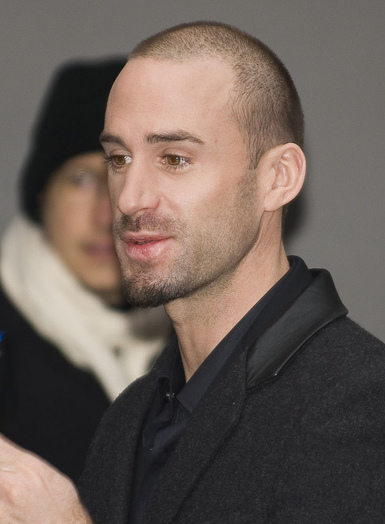
Joseph Fiennes

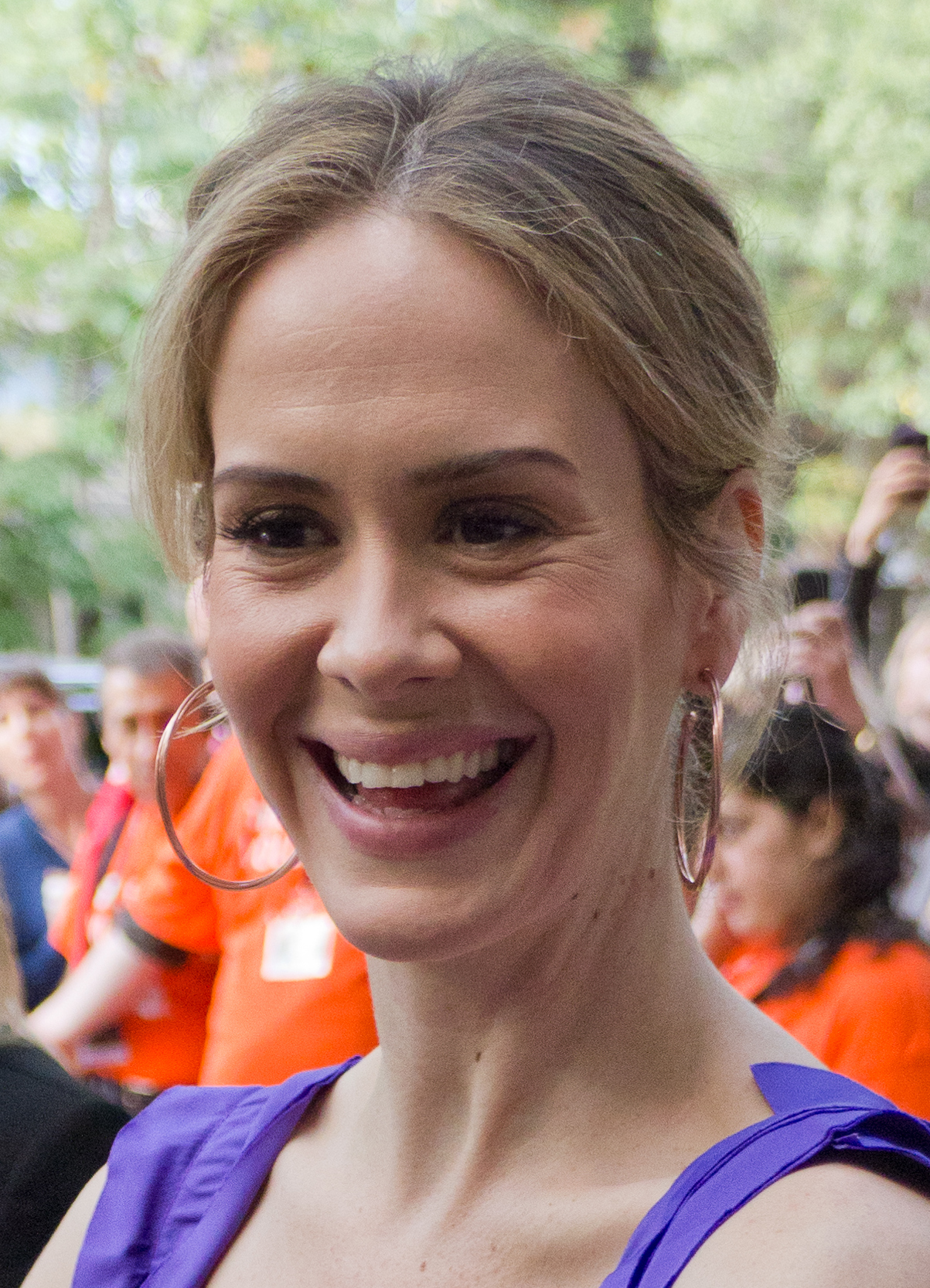
Sarah Paulson

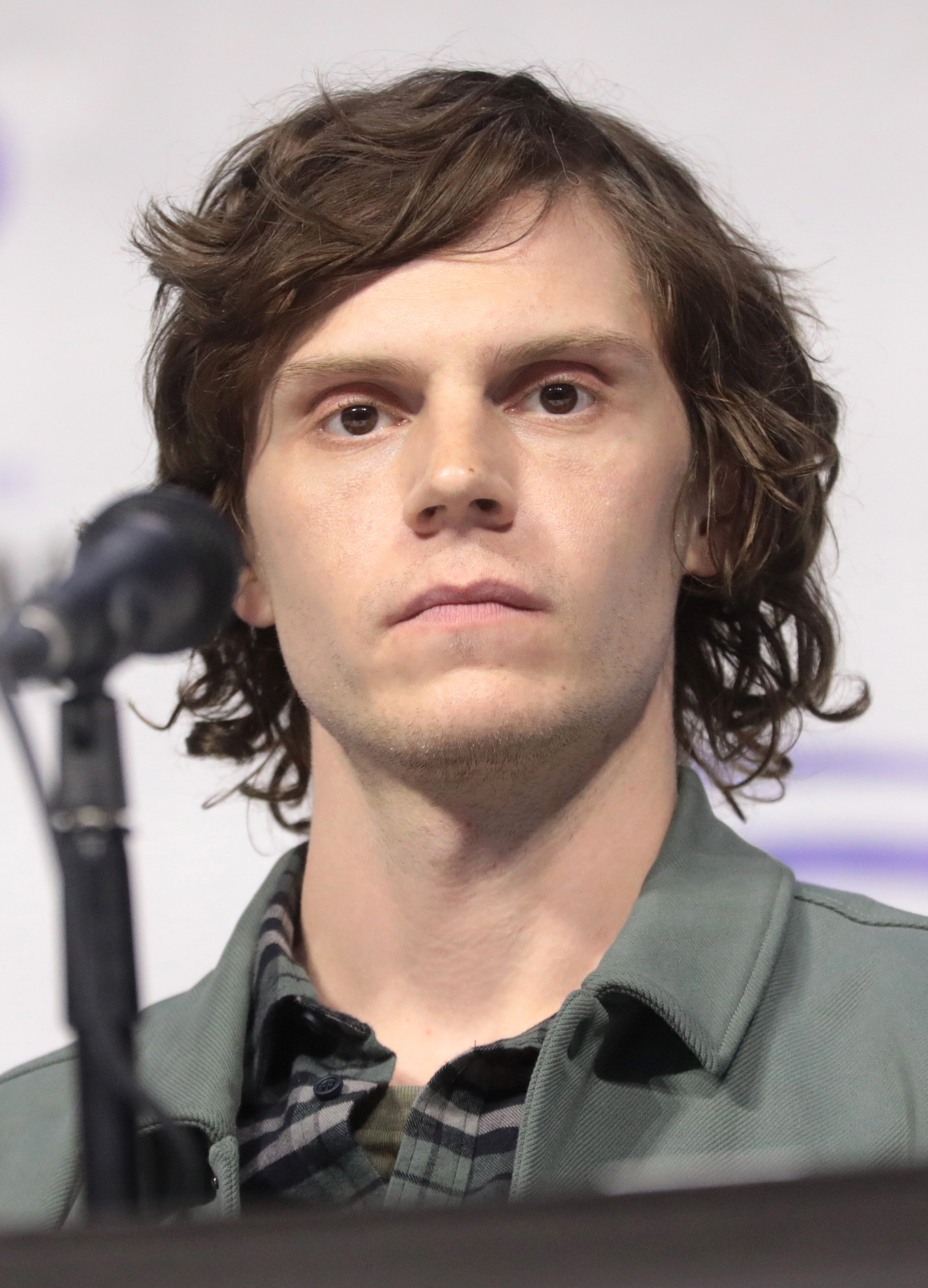
Evan Peters

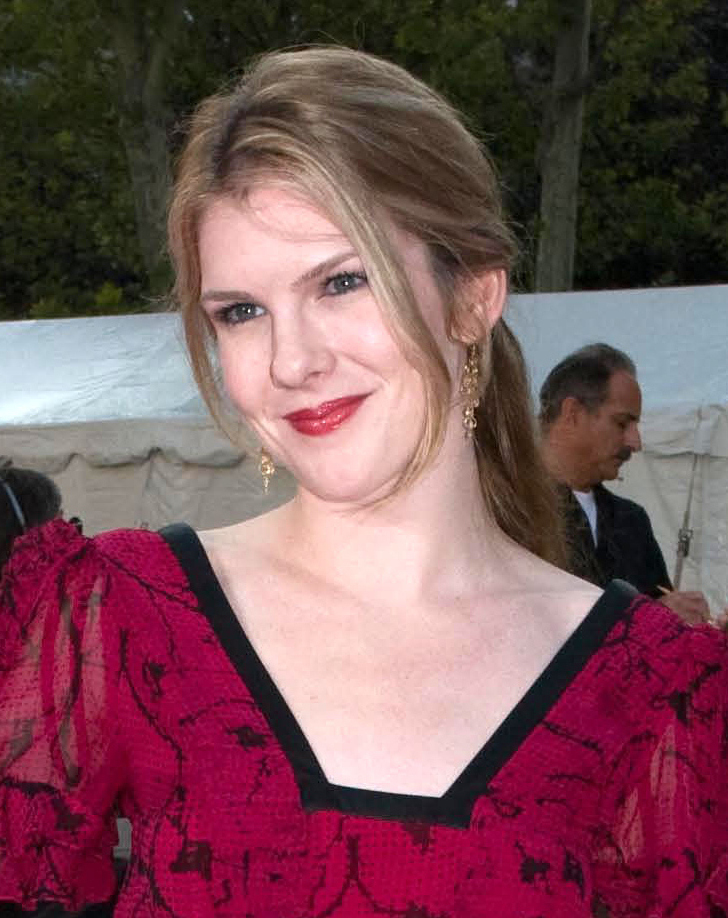
Lily Rabe

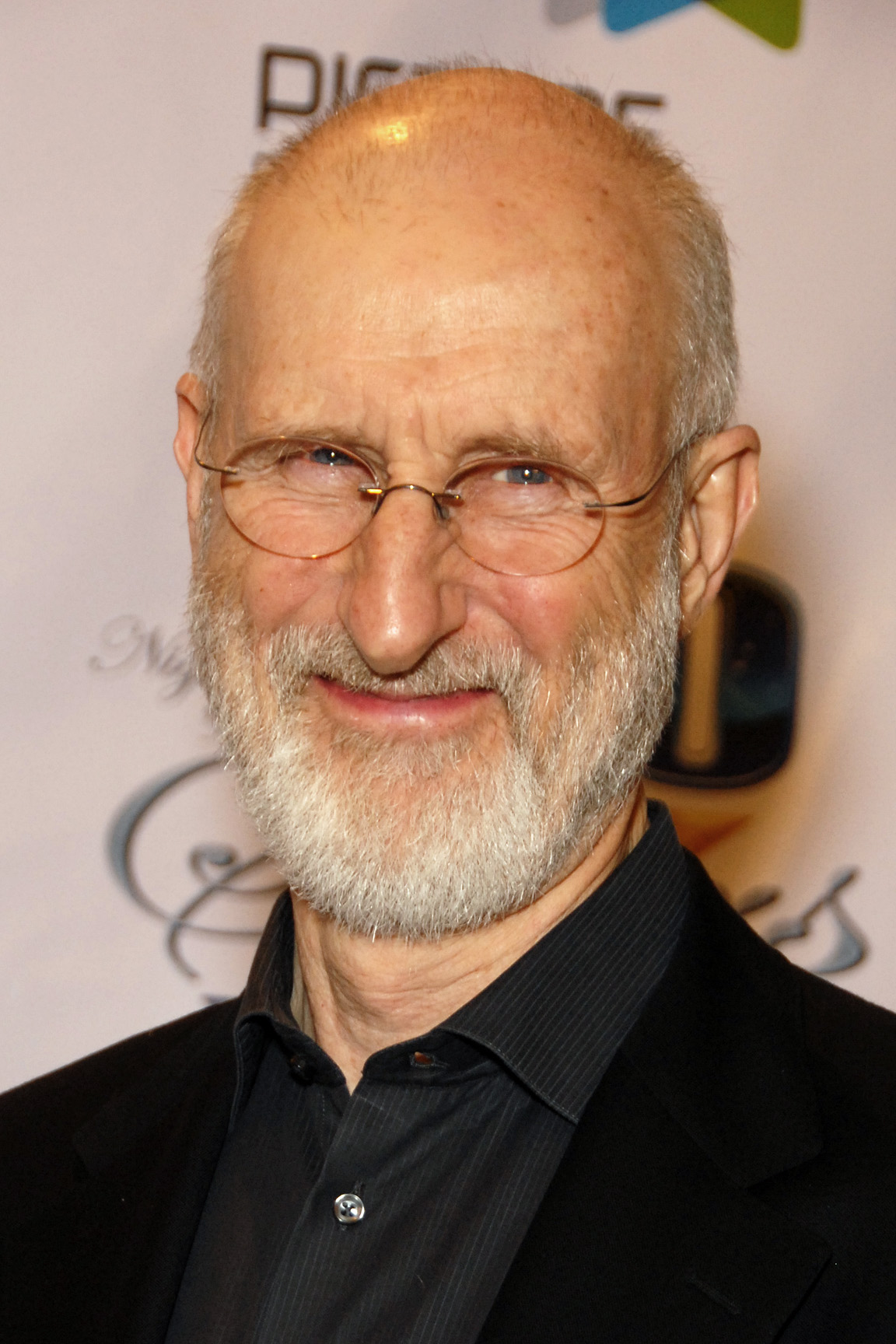
James Cromwell

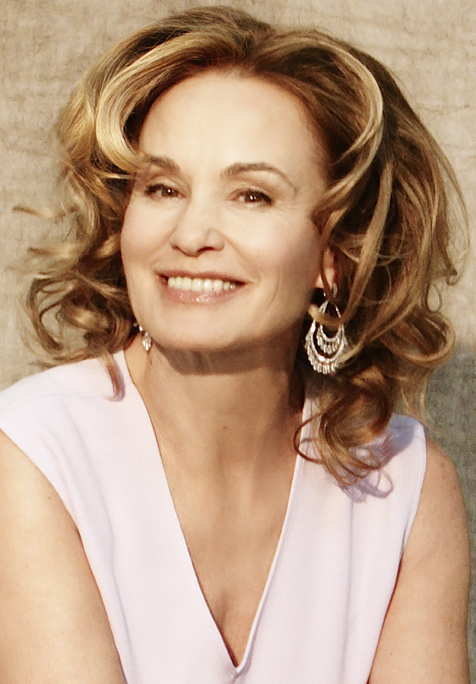
Jessica Lange

- Zachary Quinto as Dr. Oliver Thredson
- Joseph Fiennes as Monsignor Timothy Howard
- Sarah Paulson as Lana Winters
- Evan Peters as Kit Walker
- Lily Rabe as Sister Mary Eunice McKee
- Lizzie Brocheré as Grace Bertrand
- James Cromwell as Dr. Arthur Arden
- Jessica Lange as Sister Judy "Jude" Martin

=== Special guest stars ===
- Chloë Sevigny as Shelley
- Ian McShane as Leigh Emerson

=== Recurring ===
- Naomi Grossman as Pepper
- Adam Levine as Leo Morrison
- Fredric Lehne as Frank McCann
- Britne Oldford as Alma Walker
- Frances Conroy as Shachath
- Jenna Dewan as Teresa Morrison
- Clea DuVall as Wendy Peyser
- Barbara Tarbuck as Mother Superior Claudia
- Mark Consuelos as Spivey
- Matthew John Armstrong as Detective Byers
- Mark Margolis as Sam Goodman
- Dylan McDermott as Johnny Morgan
- Joel McKinnon Miller as Detective Connors

=== Guest stars ===
- Joe Egender as Billy Marshall
- Franka Potente as Charlotte Brown

== Episodes ==
| No. overall | No. in season | Title | Directed by | Written by | Original release date | Prod. code | US viewers (millions) |
|---|---|---|---|---|---|---|---|
| 13 | 1 | "Welcome to Briarcliff" | Bradley Buecker | Tim Minear | October 17, 2012 | 2ATS01 | 3.85 |
In present day, a newlywed couple, Teresa and Leo, explore the now-abandoned Briarcliff Manor, a former insane asylum in rural Massachusetts. Flashback to 1964 when Kit Walker is being committed there, accused of being infamous serial killer "Bloody Face". Kit protests his innocence and flashes of his scattered memory suggest something far more sinister responsible. At Briarcliff, Kit befriends Grace, a fellow inmate believed to have murdered her family. Journalist Lana Winters trespasses onto Briarcliff, intent on exposing its mistreatment of inmates, so she can gain a better career for her and for her lover Wendy Peyser, a teacher. She is confronted by the tyrannical Sister Jude, who has her committed to the asylum because of her homosexuality. A bitter rivalry is ignited between Sister Jude and Dr. Arthur Arden.
| 14 | 2 | "Tricks and Treats" | Bradley Buecker | James Wong | October 24, 2012 | 2ATS02 | 3.06 |
In the present day, Teresa and Leo are attacked and pursued through Briarcliff by Bloody Face. Dr. Oliver Thredson arrives at Briarcliff as Kit's court-appointed therapist to determine if he can stand trial for the "Bloody Face" murders. "Bloody Face" kills people in both periods, present and 1964. Meanwhile, an exorcist is called to the asylum after a teenager's behavior goes beyond clinical help; he is possessed by a demon. The ritual gives Lana and Grace a chance to escape, but Lana, who feels betrayed that Grace wants Kit to go with them, foils the plan by getting Grace and Kit caught. The possessed teenager exposes Sister Jude's dark past that haunts her to this day, revealing that she used to be a sleazy bar singer who accidentally ran over a little girl while driving drunk back in 1949. The teenager dies after the demon exits his body during the exorcism and enters Sister Mary Eunice, making her faint.
| 15 | 3 | "Nor'easter" | Michael Uppendahl | Jennifer Salt | October 31, 2012 | 2ATS03 | 2.47 |
In the present, Teresa and Leo are shot by men in Bloody Face masks, who are then approached by another Bloody Face. In 1964, the possessed Sister Mary Eunice begins her corruption of the asylum. She kills a female patient, called the Mexican, who senses that she is possessed. Next, Sister Mary tries to seduce Dr. Arden and then drives Sister Jude nearly insane by hinting at her past transgressions. With the news announcement that a storm is approaching, Sister Jude decides to throw a "movie night" to calm the inmates. Grace, Kit, and Lana attempt to escape the prison during the storm but retreat after crossing paths with the cannibalistic Raspers who dwell in the woods surrounding the asylum. Shelley wishes to escape with them but is caught by Dr. Arden, who knocks her out and partially amputates her legs.
| 16 | 4 | "I Am Anne Frank" | Michael Uppendahl | Jessica Sharzer | November 7, 2012 | 2ATS04 | 2.65 |
| 17 | 5 | "I Am Anne Frank" | Alfonso Gomez-Rejon | Brad Falchuk | November 14, 2012 | 2ATS05 | 2.78 |
A woman identifying herself as Anne Frank is brought into the asylum. "Anne Frank" panics when she first sees Dr. Arden. She tells Sister Jude that Dr. Arden is Dr. Hans Grüper, a Nazi doctor. Sister Jude wonders how to bring about the reality of Dr. Arden. Meanwhile, Grace admits to Kit that she killed her father and stepmother for sexually abusing her. Kit wonders if he, in fact, really is the serial killer "Bloody Face" and is simply blocking what happened the night his wife disappeared. After aversion therapy fails with Lana, Dr. Thredson promises that he will get her out of Briarcliff by the end of the week. "Anne Frank" attacks Dr. Arden and stumbles onto Shelley, who begs Anne to kill her, as she is turning into a Rasper due to Dr. Arden's experiments. Sister Jude hires a famed Nazi hunter named Mr. Goodman to build a case against Dr. Arden. Dr. Thredson convinces Kit to make a startling confession. "Anne Frank's" husband shows up to take her home but returns her after she nearly suffocated their infant son. Dr. Arden offers to perform a lobotomy on her and is given permission. After Dr. Arden threatens Sister Jude, she sneaks out on a one-night stand for a few drinks at a bar. Dr. Thredson helps Lana escape but traps her in his home, revealing himself as the real Bloody Face. To prevent Jude from finding Shelley, Sister Mary Eunice takes Shelley to a schoolyard stairwell, where she is discovered.
| 18 | 6 | "The Origins of Monstrosity" | David Semel | Ryan Murphy | November 21, 2012 | 2ATS06 | 1.89 |
To perform last rites, the Monsignor visits Shelley at the hospital and strangles her with rosary beads. A mysterious young girl becomes a new patient at Briarcliff after her mother believes she has killed someone. A flashback shows how Dr. Arden came to work at Briarcliff. Sister Jude finally gets evidence of Dr. Arden's horrific past but puts someone's life and her career at stake. Meanwhile, Dr. Arden, the Monsignor, and Sister Mary Eunice indirectly form an evil union. Elsewhere, Lana remains a hostage of Dr. Thredson/Bloody Face, who enlightens her about his past. In the present day, the police arrive at the asylum to discover three bodies, while it is also discovered that Bloody Face has captured Teresa.
| 19 | 7 | "Dark Cousin" | Michael Rymer | Tim Minear | November 28, 2012 | 2ATS07 | 2.27 |
The Angel of Death appears at the asylum after several patients wish to die, one of which is Grace. The angel's visit does not sit well with Sister Mary Eunice, but both agree their work is not finished. Sister Jude plans to use the angel's services but first must attempt to make peace with the parents of the girl she hit years ago. Jude is stunned to learn the girl survived the accident. After Lana can get away from Dr. Thredson, she is injured in a freak car accident and taken back to Briarcliff. Also, Kit escapes custody to break Grace out of the asylum, but she is accidentally shot by the chief guard, Frank, and dies.
| 20 | 8 | "Unholy Night" | Michael Lehmann | James Wong | December 5, 2012 | 2ATS08 | 2.36 |
On Christmas Eve in 1962, a man kills a Charity Santa and then a family while dressed in the stolen Santa costume, landing himself in Briarcliff. The next year, while celebrating Christmas at Briarcliff, he commits a murder and is locked away in solitary confinement by Sister Jude. In 1964, it is Christmastime once again and Sister Mary Eunice is leading the festivities. Sister Jude sneaks into the asylum and tries to kill Sister Mary Eunice, but is thwarted, and escorted from the building. Mary Eunice then frees Leigh, the patient who committed the Christmas murders, from his solitary confinement and allows him to join the Christmas celebration. Dr. Arden, growing more disturbed by Sister Mary Eunice's behavior, secretly calls on Sister Jude for help in saving her, possibly through an exorcism. Instead, when Sister Jude arrives at Briarcliff, Sister Mary Eunice locks her in her office with Leigh so he can seek revenge on her for putting him in solitary for so long and treating him inhumanely. This reveals Dr. Arden's efforts to be a ruse at Sister Eunice's behest. Sister Jude is beaten and thrown around, but she manages to stab Leigh and escape him. Meanwhile, Lana reunites with Kit making him privy to the fact that Dr. Thredson is Bloody Face, which proves him innocent. Dr. Thredson finds Lana at the asylum and tries to kill her, but Kit saves her and Thredson is left tied up, alive, on the floor. Dr. Arden also has a startling encounter in the Death Chute while disposing of Grace's body, which disappears.
| 21 | 9 | "The Coat Hanger" | Jeremy Podeswa | Jennifer Salt | December 12, 2012 | 2ATS09 | 2.22 |
Modern-day Bloody Face, Johnny Morgan, attends a therapy session where he reveals himself to be the son of Dr. Thredson aka Bloody Face. He has been following in his father's footsteps, but without any medical training. His therapist is later found murdered. In 1964, Sister Mary Eunice reveals to Lana that she is pregnant by Dr. Thredson, but she remains in the asylum without being allowed an abortion. Sister Jude is officially removed from her position and admitted as a patient for stabbing Leigh and murdering several other people whose deaths she is falsely accused of by various people in power at Briarcliff including Monsignor Howard. Lana and Kit trick Dr. Thredson into confessing that he is Bloody Face by threatening to abort Lana's pregnancy. After revealing their ruse, Lana admits she already killed it with a coat hanger. Dr. Arden finds Kit and shares that he has seen the aliens Kit spoke of when they took Grace's body from him. Dr. Arden convinces him to almost die and force the aliens to return. Monsignor Howard leads a penitent Leigh to be baptized with disastrous results. Lana discovers that Dr. Thredson has escaped with the help of Sister Mary Eunice, who informs her that she is still pregnant- with a boy. When Dr. Arden kills Kit, he finds Grace alive in a cell; saved by the aliens and pregnant at full-term with Kit's baby. Monsignor Howard is later found crucified. His death wish summons the Angel of Death.
| 22 | 10 | "The Name Game" | Michael Lehmann | Jessica Sharzer | January 2, 2013 | 2ATS10 | 2.21 |
Dr. Arden tells Kit that the aliens never came to save him so Dr. Arden brought him back from death, and withholds information about Grace. When Dr. Arden visits Grace, he finds that she is protected from his experiments by the aliens, and Pepper the "pinhead"; who knows much more than she should. Monsignor Howard has apparently survived, encouraged by the Angel of Death's revelations about the Devil's presence at Briarcliff. Dr. Thredson seeks out Kit, and Lana, who he is keeping alive as the mother of their baby. Now a patient and known by her common name, Judy Martin, Sister Jude gets subjected to the asylum's inhumane torturous treatments and falls into insanity. Sister Mary Eunice rapes Monsignor Howard, now fully aware of her possession. He seeks Judy's advice, which is to kill Sister Mary Eunice. Dr. Arden puts an end to his "experiments", shooting each of the Raspers. While looking for Dr. Arden, Dr. Thredson witnesses Grace going into labor, and a boy is later born. Thredson reveals this to Kit, then looks for the incriminating tape, but Lana has moved it and is the only one who knows its whereabouts. Taking the fight to Sister Mary Eunice, Monsignor Howard eventually pushes her off the third floor, where the Angel of Death takes both her life and her possession. Saddened by her death, Dr. Arden kills himself in the same fire that cremates Sister Mary Eunice's body. Judy is visited by Mother Superior Claudia, and asks her to free Lana.
| 23 | 11 | "Spilt Milk" | Alfonso Gomez-Rejon | Brad Falchuk | January 9, 2013 | 2ATS11 | 2.51 |
Told by Judy of Lana's innocence, Mother Superior Claudia manages to help Lana escape from the asylum, who exposes the crimes at Briarcliff and those of Dr. Thredson. Lana later confronts Dr. Thredson/Bloody Face at his house and kills him. Kit, Grace, and their son are set free and reunited at Kit's home, where they find Alma with another baby. Judy promises Monsignor Howard that his and the asylum's downfall are soon to come. Lana tries to get Judy out of Briarcliff but fails because Monsignor Howard has faked her death.
| 24 | 12 | "Continuum" | Craig Zisk | Ryan Murphy | January 16, 2013 | 2ATS12 | 2.30 |
Two years since his release from Briarcliff, Kit must deal with his polygamic life with Alma and Grace. Horrified of the aliens' abductions, Alma eventually becomes hysterical, chops Grace to death, and ends up being committed to Briarcliff. Sister Jude, now known as "Betty Drake", slips further into insanity at the asylum. In 1969, Lana publishes a book about her ordeal, even though it may not all be true. Alma dies in the asylum. In the present day, Johnny seeks out a copy of the book to continue his father's murderous "work".
| 25 | 13 | "Madness Ends" | Alfonso Gomez-Rejon | Tim Minear | January 23, 2013 | 2ATS13 | 2.29 |
In the present day, Lana Winters, now older and a famous, out-and-proud, television reporter, grants an interview in which she discusses her crusade to closing down Briarcliff and exposing Dr. Arden as a Nazi war criminal, which led to the Monsignor killing himself. It is later revealed that in 1970, Kit had secretly rescued Sister Jude from Briarcliff. Jude eventually becomes part of Kit's family, creating strong ties with his two children. Jude dies in Kit's home six months later from an apparent brain tumor. Kit develops pancreatic cancer and is taken away by the aliens, never to be seen again. Johnny confronts Lana after the interview by pointing a gun at her and reveals that he is her son from her one-time rape by Dr. Thredson. Lana ultimately convinces Johnny to put down the gun before shooting him herself. In the final scene, there is a flashback to the first episode, "Welcome to Briarcliff," in which Jude tries to convince Lana to give up her desires to interview the killer Bloody Face.

== Production ==
=== Development ===
What you saw in the [season one] finale was the end of the Harmon house. The second season of the show will be a brand-new home or building to haunt. Just like this year, every season of this show will have a beginning, middle, and end. [The second season] won't be in L.A. It will obviously be in America but in a completely different locale.

— Executive producer Ryan Murphy on American Horror Story's second season.

In October 2011, the FX Network renewed American Horror Story for a second season. In December 2011, series co-creator Ryan Murphy announced his plans to change the characters and location for the second season. He did say, however, that some actors who starred in the first season would be returning. "The people that are coming back will be playing completely different characters, creatures, monsters, etc. [The Harmons'] stories are done. People who are coming back will be playing entirely new characters," he announced.

In May 2012, Murphy revealed that the setting for the second season would be an institution for the criminally insane that Jessica Lange's character operates in the 1960s, called Briarcliff Manor and located on the East Coast. In an interview with Entertainment Weekly, Murphy spoke about originally wanting to set the season in prison, "I think at one point as we were spitballing season two before we landed on the asylum idea, we had actually talked about doing the second season in a prison but then Alcatraz came along and stole that idea. It was never very definitive, but I always liked that idea. I think an insane asylum for us was probably much more effective."

Talking about the season, Murphy commented, "It's a completely different world and has nothing to do with season 1; there's not a mention of season 1... The second season is set in a completely different time period." He later said, "Everyone looks so different; people who were enemies last year are allies this year. The sets are amazing. It's 1964, so everything looks very different."

"To me, last year was a family drama. This is our version of a workplace drama."

— Co-creator Brad Falchuk on the second season

Murphy had also told TV Guide that there would not be any ghosts in the second season, "I think the story is horrifying," he said. "The story is a period piece in a mental institution based largely on truth, and truth is always scarier than fiction."

In August 2012, Murphy announced the season's new name by stating, "We picked 'Asylum' because it not only describes the setting – an insane asylum run by Jessica Lange's character which was formerly a tuberculosis ward – but also signifies a place of haven for the unloved and the unwanted," he said. "This year's theme is about sanity and tackling real-life horrors."

Previous consulting producer Tim Minear was promoted to executive producer and continued writing for the series, beginning with the season premiere. He also scripted the season finale.

=== Casting ===
In March 2012, Murphy revealed that the second season had been conceptualized around Jessica Lange, saying, "This will really be the Jessica Lange show, so I'm very excited about it. We are designing this amazing new opposite of the Constance character for her. She and I have spoken about different things. She has a lot of ideas and has a lot of input into her character. She told me some things she has always wanted to play as an actress." She portrayed Sister Jude, an apparently sadistic nun. Zachary Quinto, who had a recurring role as Chad in the first season, was confirmed as one of the leads in March 2012. He portrayed Dr. Oliver Thredson, a psychiatrist with groundbreaking treatment methods that go against Sister Jude's. Comparing his new character to his previous one, Quinto said, "He's much more grounded and in control." At the PaleyFest 2012, Evan Peters, Sarah Paulson, and Lily Rabe were confirmed to return as main cast members for the second season. Paulson portrayed Lana Winters, a lesbian reporter whose girlfriend is coerced by Sister Jude into having her committed to the asylum, Rabe portrayed Sister Mary Eunice, an innocent and loyal second-in-charge to Sister Jude, and Peters portrayed Kit Walker, a man who's accused of murdering his wife, Alma (Britne Oldford), but he claims aliens abducted her. Murphy had stated that Peters, "who was last season's ultimate badass bad boy," would be the hero of the show this season.

It was reported in March 2012 that Maroon 5 frontman Adam Levine was in final negotiations to appear in the second season and that he would play Leo, a "contemporary character and half of a couple called "The Lovers," according to Tim Stack of Entertainment Weekly. Levine revealed to E! in June 2012 that his character is "newly married" and would go with his wife on their honeymoon. "I don't want to tell you too much... but it's gory." Jenna Dewan-Tatum played his wife, Teresa. In April 2012, Lizzie Brocheré was cast to play Grace, a character described originally as "a fierce, ferocious, extremely sexual, and dangerous wild-child sexpot" to rival Jessica Lange's character, but the role was later heavily revamped. In May 2012, James Cromwell signed on to co-star as Dr. Arthur Arden, a man who works in the asylum, and who is revealed to have been a Nazi. Chloë Sevigny played the role of Shelley, a nymphomaniac whose husband has her placed in the asylum.

In June 2012, Joseph Fiennes joined the main cast as Monsignor Timothy Howard, a possible love interest for Jessica Lange's Sister Jude. Later that month, Chris Zylka was cast to play Daniel, who was touted as "the most beautiful boy in the world and a deaf-mute"; however, Zylka was later replaced by an unmentioned actor, due to his reluctance to shave his head for the role. Britne Oldford was cast in the recurring role of Alma, Peters' character's supposed dead/missing wife. In July 2012, Mark Consuelos was cast as a patient named Spivey, who was described as a degenerate bully. Also in July, Clea DuVall was cast as Wendy, a school teacher and Lana's girlfriend, and Franka Potente was cast in an unspecified role, which was later revealed to be Anne Frank / Charlotte Brown.

In August 2012, Blake Sheldon was cast in the dual role of Devon and Cooper – both described as "tall, thin and psychopathic." Ultimately Sheldon would portray only Cooper. Murder House actress Frances Conroy guest-starred as Shachath, the Angel of Death. Eric Stonestreet was scheduled to guest star this season as a killer, but his appearance never came to fruition. Mark Margolis recurred as Sam Goodwin, while David Chisum and Amy Farrington guest-starred as a caring husband and a troubled mother, respectively. In mid-October, Ian McShane joined the season in the recurring role of Leigh Emerson, a psychotic man who murders people while wearing a Santa Claus suit; he has a vendetta against Sister Jude. Dylan McDermott appeared during the second half of the season as Johnny Morgan, the modern-day Bloody Face.

=== Filming ===
Principal photography for the second season began on July 17, 2012. The exteriors for the second season were filmed in Hidden Valley, Ventura County, California, a rural area outside Los Angeles. The exterior filming of Briarcliff was done at the Old Orange County Courthouse. Series production designer Mark Worthington stated, "It's referred to as Richardsonian and Romanesque. It's named after an architect named Henry Hobson Richardson. He developed the style in the 19th century. It's circular arches, heavy stone. It's creepy, great for horror. It's dark, dark shiny brick. That's how we got away from all the hospital light stuff. There's still an institutional feel to it."

=== Soundtrack ===
==== Digital singles ====
| Year | Song | Performer | Episode | Notes |
|---|---|---|---|---|
| 2013 | "The Name Game" | Jessica Lange | "The Name Game" | Originally performed by Shirley Ellis; Released on January 15, 2013 |
Note: Released by 20th Century Fox TV Records.

== Release ==
=== Home media ===
American Horror Story: Asylum – The Complete Second Season
| Set Details | | Special Features |
| 13 Episodes; 4 Disc Set (DVD); 3 Disc Set (BD); English 5.1 Dolby Digital; Subtitles: English SDH, Spanish, French; Runtime: 554 Minutes | | The Orderly; What is American Horror Story: Asylum?; Welcome to Briarcliff Manor; The Creatures; Deleted Scenes |
Release Dates
| Region 1 | Region 2 | Region 4 |
| October 8, 2013 | October 21, 2013 | November 15, 2013 |

== Reception ==
=== Critical response ===
American Horror Story: Asylum has received positive reviews from critics. It scored 65 out of 100 on Metacritic based on 23 reviews. The review aggregation website Rotten Tomatoes reported an 84% approval rating with an average rating of 7.27/10 based on 220 reviews. The website's consensus reads, "American Horror Story: Asylum crosses boundaries to shock and scare with sexy subplots and some innovative takes on current social issues." James Poniewozik, from Time, said of the early episodes of the second season, "AHS: Asylum feels like a more focused, if equally frenetic, screamfest. It's also gorgeously realized, with a vision of its '60s institution setting so detailed you can smell the stale air and incense."

Maureen Ryan of The Huffington Post said, "It's to the credit of Asylum's writers, directors and cast that the emotional pain of the characters often feels as real as their uncertainty and terror." However, Verne Gay of Newsday gave the season a C grade, writing that it "has some good special effects, just not much of a story to hang them on." Linda Stasi of the New York Post thought this season was "over the top", stating, "I need to enter [an asylum] myself after two hours of this craziness."

In a round-up of outstanding entertainers and programs of 2012, Jess Cagle of Entertainment Weekly praised "its ballsy, go-for-broke, don't-tax-the-attention-span-of-any-gnats-who-might-be-watching approach", writing, "You know a show has a lot going on when the occasional appearance of extraterrestrials is no more surprising than spotting a Prius on Modern Family. FX's grand experiment American Horror Story came howling back for its second terrifying season with less of a story...than a macabre, unforgettable, discordant symphony of images and characters... American Horror Story: Asylum, set mostly in the 1960s, took the current zeitgeist – with all its free-floating fear, nefarious undercurrents, and outrageous anxiety – skinned it alive, and turned it into a lamp to illuminate our collectively twisted psyche and voracious appetite for distraction."

American Horror Story season 2: Critical reception by episode
Season 2 (2012–13): Percentage of positive critics' reviews tracked by the website Rotten Tomatoes

=== Ratings ===
The first episode of the season gained a 2.2 ratings share among adults aged 18–49 and garnered 3.85 million viewers, marking the highest numbers for the series and the highest numbers for the night's cable competition.

Nielsen Media Research, which records streaming viewership on certain U.S. television screens, reported that American Horror Story: Asylum garnered 806 million minutes of watch time, averaging 62.0 million minutes viewed per episode, between May 1, 2024, and August 31, 2026.

== Accolades ==
In its second season, American Horror Story: Asylum was nominated for 89 awards and won 28.

| Year | Association | Category | Nominee(s) | Result |
|---|---|---|---|---|
| 2012 | 17th Satellite Awards | Best Supporting Actor – Series, Miniseries or TV Film | Evan Peters | Nominated |
| 2012 | 17th Satellite Awards | Best TV Series – Genre | American Horror Story: Asylum | Nominated |
| 2012 | IGN's Best of 2012: TV | Best Sci-Fi/Horror Series | American Horror Story: Asylum | Nominated |
| 2012 | IGN's Best of 2012: TV | Best TV Actress | Jessica Lange | Nominated |
| 2012 | 4th Dorian Awards | TV Performance of the Year | Jessica Lange | Won |
| 2012 | 4th Dorian Awards | TV Drama of the Year | American Horror Story: Asylum | Won |
| 2012 | 4th Dorian Awards | LGBT-Themed TV Show of the Year | American Horror Story: Asylum | Nominated |
| 2012 | 4th Dorian Awards | Campy TV Show of the Year | American Horror Story: Asylum | Nominated |
| 2013 | 3rd Critics' Choice TV Awards | Best Movie or Miniseries | American Horror Story: Asylum | Nominated |
| 2013 | 3rd Critics' Choice TV Awards | Best Actress in a Movie or Miniseries | Jessica Lange | Nominated |
| 2013 | 3rd Critics' Choice TV Awards | Best Supporting Actor in a Movie or Miniseries | Zachary Quinto | Won |
| 2013 | 3rd Critics' Choice TV Awards | Best Supporting Actor in a Movie or Miniseries | James Cromwell | Nominated |
| 2013 | 3rd Critics' Choice TV Awards | Best Supporting Actress in a Movie or Miniseries | Sarah Paulson | Won |
| 2013 | 3rd Critics' Choice TV Awards | Best Supporting Actress in a Movie or Miniseries | Lily Rabe | Nominated |
| 2013 | 19th Screen Actors Guild Awards | Outstanding Performance by a Female Actor in a Drama Series | Jessica Lange | Nominated |
| 2013 | 24th GLAAD Media Awards | Outstanding TV Movie or Mini-Series | American Horror Story: Asylum | Won |
| 2013 | 29th TCA Awards | Outstanding Achievement in Movies, Mini-Series, and Specials | American Horror Story: Asylum | Nominated |
| 2013 | 39th Saturn Awards | Best Syndicated/Cable TV Series | American Horror Story: Asylum | Nominated |
| 2013 | 39th Saturn Awards | Best Actress on TV | Sarah Paulson | Nominated |
| 2013 | 39th Saturn Awards | Best Supporting Actress on TV | Jessica Lange | Nominated |
| 2013 | 70th Golden Globe Awards | Best Actress – Miniseries or TV Film | Jessica Lange | Nominated |
| 2013 | 65th DGA Awards | Outstanding Directing – Miniseries or TV Film | Michael Rymer (for "Dark Cousin") | Nominated |
| 2013 | American Film Institute Awards 2012 | TV Programs of the Year | American Horror Story: Asylum | Won |
| 2013 | 17th ADG Excellence in Production Design Awards | TV movie or Miniseries | Mark Worthington (for "I Am Anne Frank: Part 2") | Won |
| 2013 | 60th MPSE Golden Reel Awards | Best Sound Editing: Short Form Sound Effects and Foley in TV | Episode: "Welcome to Briarcliff" | Won |
| 2013 | 17th Online Film & TV Association Awards | Best Actress in a Motion Picture or Miniseries | Jessica Lange | Won |
| 2013 | 17th Online Film & TV Association Awards | Best Supporting Actor in a Motion Picture or Miniseries | Zachary Quinto | Won |
| 2013 | 17th Online Film & TV Association Awards | Best Supporting Actor in a Motion Picture or Miniseries | James Cromwell | Nominated |
| 2013 | 17th Online Film & TV Association Awards | Best Supporting Actor in a Motion Picture or Miniseries | Evan Peters | Nominated |
| 2013 | 17th Online Film & TV Association Awards | Best Supporting Actress in a Motion Picture or Miniseries | Sarah Paulson | Won |
| 2013 | 17th Online Film & TV Association Awards | Best Supporting Actress in a Motion Picture or Miniseries | Lily Rabe | Nominated |
| 2013 | 17th Online Film & TV Association Awards | Best Motion Picture or Miniseries | American Horror Story: Asylum | Won |
| 2013 | 17th Online Film & TV Association Awards | Best Ensemble in a Motion Picture or Miniseries | American Horror Story: Asylum | Won |
| 2013 | 17th Online Film & TV Association Awards | Best Direction of a Motion Picture or Miniseries | American Horror Story: Asylum | Nominated |
| 2013 | 17th Online Film & TV Association Awards | Best Writing of a Motion Picture or Miniseries | American Horror Story: Asylum | Nominated |
| 2013 | 17th Online Film & TV Association Awards | Best Music in a Non-Series | American Horror Story: Asylum | Won |
| 2013 | 17th Online Film & TV Association Awards | Best Editing in a Non-Series | American Horror Story: Asylum | Won |
| 2013 | 17th Online Film & TV Association Awards | Best Cinematography in a Non-Series | American Horror Story: Asylum | Won |
| 2013 | 17th Online Film & TV Association Awards | Best Production Design in a Non-Series | American Horror Story: Asylum | Won |
| 2013 | 17th Online Film & TV Association Awards | Best Costume Design in a Non-Series | American Horror Story: Asylum | Nominated |
| 2013 | 17th Online Film & TV Association Awards | Best Makeup/Hairstyling in a Non-Series | American Horror Story: Asylum | Nominated |
| 2013 | 17th Online Film & TV Association Awards | Best Sound in a Non-Series | American Horror Story: Asylum | Won |
| 2013 | 17th Online Film & TV Association Awards | Best Visual Effects in a Non-Series | American Horror Story: Asylum | Won |
| 2013 | 17th Online Film & TV Association Awards | Best New Theme Song in a Non-Series | American Horror Story: Asylum | Won |
| 2013 | 17th Online Film & TV Association Awards | Best New Titles Sequence in a Non-Series | American Horror Story: Asylum | Won |
| 2013 | 65th Primetime Emmy Awards | Outstanding Limited/Anthology or Movie | American Horror Story: Asylum | Nominated |
| 2013 | 65th Primetime Emmy Awards | Outstanding Lead Actress in a Limited/Anthology Series or Movie | Jessica Lange | Nominated |
| 2013 | 65th Primetime Emmy Awards | Outstanding Supporting Actor in a Limited/ Anthology Series or Movie | James Cromwell | Won |
| 2013 | 65th Primetime Emmy Awards | Outstanding Supporting Actor in a Limited/ Anthology Series or Movie | Zachary Quinto | Nominated |
| 2013 | 65th Primetime Emmy Awards | Outstanding Supporting Actress in a Limited/Anthology Series or Movie | Sarah Paulson | Nominated |
| 2013 | 65th Primetime Creative Arts Emmy Awards | Outstanding Art Direction for a Miniseries or Movie | Mark Worthington, Andrew Murdock, Ellen Brill (for "I Am Anne Frank: Part 2") | Nominated |
| 2013 | 65th Primetime Creative Arts Emmy Awards | Outstanding Art Direction for a Miniseries or Movie | Mark Worthington, Edward L. Rubin, Ellen Brill (for "Welcome to Briarcliff") | Nominated |
| 2013 | 65th Primetime Creative Arts Emmy Awards | Outstanding Casting for a Limited/Anthology Series or Movie | Robert J. Ulrich, Eric Dawson | Nominated |
| 2013 | 65th Primetime Creative Arts Emmy Awards | Outstanding Costumes for a Miniseries, Movie, or Special | Chrisi Karvonides, Conan Castro (for "Madness Ends") | Nominated |
| 2013 | 65th Primetime Creative Arts Emmy Awards | Outstanding Cinematography for a Miniseries or Movie | Michael Goi (for "I Am Anne Frank: Part 2") | Nominated |
| 2013 | 65th Primetime Creative Arts Emmy Awards | Outstanding Single-Camera Picture Editing for a Miniseries or Movie | Fabienne Bouville (for "Nor'easter") | Nominated |
| 2013 | 65th Primetime Creative Arts Emmy Awards | Outstanding Hairstyling for a Miniseries or Movie | Monte C. Haught, Janis Clark, Stacey K. Black, Natalie Driscoll, Michelle Ceglia | Nominated |
| 2013 | 65th Primetime Creative Arts Emmy Awards | Outstanding Main Title Design | Ryan Murphy, Kyle Cooper, Juan Ruiz Anchia, Kate Berry | Nominated |
| 2013 | 65th Primetime Creative Arts Emmy Awards | Outstanding Make-up for a Miniseries or Movie | Eryn Krueger Mekash, Kim Ayers, Silvina Knight, John Elliot | Nominated |
| 2013 | 65th Primetime Creative Arts Emmy Awards | Outstanding Prosthetic Make-up for a Series, Miniseries, Movie, or Special | Eryn Krueger Mekash, Mike Mekash, Hiroshi Yada, Christopher Nelson, Kim Ayers, Silvina Knight, Christien Tinsley, Jason Hamer | Nominated |
| 2013 | 65th Primetime Creative Arts Emmy Awards | Outstanding Sound Editing for a Miniseries, Movie, or Special | Gary Megregian, Steve M. Stuhr, Jason Krane, Christian Buenaventura, Timothy A. Cleveland, David Klotz, Andrew Dawson, Noel Vought (for "Welcome to Briarcliff") | Won |
| 2013 | 65th Primetime Creative Arts Emmy Awards | Outstanding Sound Mixing for a Miniseries or Movie | Sean Rush, Joe Earle, Doug Andham (for "Welcome to Briarcliff") | Nominated |
| 2013 | 2nd PAAFTJ TV Awards* | Best Miniseries or TV Movie | American Horror Story: Asylum | Nominated |
| 2013 | 2nd PAAFTJ TV Awards* | Best Lead Actress in Miniseries or TV Movie | Jessica Lange | Nominated |
| 2013 | 2nd PAAFTJ TV Awards* | Best Supporting Actor in a Miniseries or TV Movie | James Cromwell | Nominated |
| 2013 | 2nd PAAFTJ TV Awards* | Best Supporting Actor in a Miniseries or TV Movie | Zachary Quinto | Nominated |
| 2013 | 2nd PAAFTJ TV Awards* | Best Supporting Actress in a Miniseries or TV Movie | Sarah Paulson | Nominated |
| 2013 | 2nd PAAFTJ TV Awards* | Best Cast in a Miniseries or TV Movie | Zachary Quinto, Joseph Fiennes, Sarah Paulson, Evan Peters, Lily Rabe, Lizzie Brocheré, James Cromwell, Jessica Lange | Nominated |
| 2013 | 2nd PAAFTJ TV Awards* | Best Directing for a Miniseries or TV Movie | Michael Rymer (for "Dark Cousin") | Nominated |
| 2013 | 2nd PAAFTJ TV Awards* | Best Writing for a Miniseries or TV Movie | Brad Falchuk (for "I Am Anne Frank: Part 2") | Nominated |
| 2013 | 2nd PAAFTJ TV Awards* | Best Artistic/Visual Achievement in a Miniseries or TV Movie | Michael Goi (cinematography), Mark Worthington (production design), Andrew Murdock (art direction), Elen Brill (set decoration), Monte C. Haught (hair), Lou Eyrich (costumes) (for "I Am Anne Frank: Part 2") | Nominated |
| 2013 | 2nd PAAFTJ TV Awards* | Best Technical Achievement in a Miniseries or TV Movie | Stewart Schill (film editing), Jason Piccioni (visual effects), John Bauman (sound mixing) (for "Madness Ends") | Nominated |
| 2013 | Bram Stoker Award 2012 | Superior Achievement in a Screenplay | Tim Minear (for "Dark Cousin") | Nominated |
| 2013 | 27th ASC Awards | Outstanding Achievement in Cinematography: Motion Picture/Miniseries | Michael Goi, ASC (for "I Am Anne Frank: Part 2") | Nominated |
| 2013 | BMI Film & TV Awards 2013 | BMI Cable Award | Charlie Clouser | Won |
| 2013 | BMI Film & TV Awards 2013 | BMI Cable Award | Cesar Davila-Irizarry | Won |
| 2013 | 29th Artios Awards | TV movie or Miniseries | Robert J. Ulrich, Eric Dawson, Carol Kritzer, Eric Souliere (Associate) | Nominated |
| 2013 | 49th CAS Awards | Outstanding Achievement in Sound Mixing – TV Movie or Miniseries | Sean Rush (Production Mixer); Joe Earle, CAS (Re-recording Mixer); Doug Andham, CAS (Re-recording Mixer); James S. Levine (Scoring Mixer); Judah Getz (ADR Mixer); Kyle Billingsley (Foley Mixer) (for "Welcome to Briarcliff") | Nominated |
| 2013 | 15th CDG Awards | Outstanding Made for Television Movie or Miniseries | Lou Eyrich | Won |
| 2013 | 5th Dorian Awards | TV Musical Performance of the Year | Jessica Lange and cast (for "The Name Game") | Nominated |
| 2013 | 8th HPA Awards | Outstanding Editing – TV | Joe Leonard and Bradley Buecker, A.C.E. (for "Welcome To Briarcliff") | Nominated |
| 2013 | Key Art Awards 2013 | Best Engagement | American Horror Story: Asylum (for its Blu-Ray/DVD commercial, "AHS Asylum: Get Committed") | Won |
| 2013 | 17th PRISM Awards | Drama Series Multi-Episode Storyline – Substance Use | Episodes: "Nor'easter", "I Am Anne Frank: Part 2", "Dark Cousin" | Won |
| 2013 | TV Guide Awards 2013 | Favorite Villain | Zachary Quinto (as Bloody Face) | Nominated |
| 2013 | Women's Image Network Awards 2013 | Outstanding Actress Made for TV Movie/Miniseries | Jessica Lange | Nominated |
| 2014 | Society of Camera Operators Awards 2014 | Camera Operator of the Year – TV | James Reid, SOC | Nominated |
| 2014 | 25th PGA Awards | Outstanding Producer of Long-Form TV | Brad Buecker, Dante Di Loreto, Brad Falchuk, Alexis Martin Woodall, Tim Minear, Ryan Murphy, Jennifer Salt, Chip Vucelich, James Wong | Nominated |
| 2014 | Bram Stoker Award 2013 | Superior Achievement in a Screenplay | Brad Falchuk (for "Spilt Milk") | Nominated |
| 2014 | 64th ACE Eddie Awards | Best Edited Miniseries or Motion Picture for TV | Stewart Schill, A.C.E. (for "The Name Game") | Nominated |

* The Pan-American Association of Film & Television Journalists never announced the winners.
