= American Cinema Editors Awards 2014 =

64th ACE Eddie Awards
- Presented by: American Cinema Editors
- Date: February 7, 2014
- Site: The Beverly Hilton, Beverly Hills, California

Highlights
- Best Film: Drama: Captain Phillips
- Best Film: Musical or Comedy: American Hustle

The 64th American Cinema Editors Eddie Awards were presented on February 7, 2014, at the Beverly Hilton Hotel, and honored the best editing in films and television of 2013.

== Winners and nominees ==
=== Film ===
Best Edited Feature Film – Dramatic:

Christopher Rouse – Captain Phillips

- Joe Walker – 12 Years a Slave
- Alfonso Cuarón and Mark Sanger – Gravity
- Eric Zumbrunnen and Jeff Buchanan – Her
- Mark Livolsi – Saving Mr. Banks

Best Edited Feature Film – Comedy or Musical:

Jay Cassidy, Crispin Struthers, and Alan Baumgarten – American Hustle

- Stephen Mirrione – August: Osage County
- Ethan Coen, Joel Coen – Inside Llewyn Davis
- Kevin Kent – Nebraska
- Thelma Schoonmaker – The Wolf of Wall Street

Best Edited Animated Feature Film:

Jeff Draheim – Frozen

- Gregory Perler – Despicable Me 2
- Greg Snyder – Monsters University

Best Edited Documentary Feature:

Douglas Blush, Kevin Klauber and Jason Zeldes – 20 Feet from Stardom

- Eli Despres – Blackfish
- Patrick Sheffield – Tim's Vermeer

=== Television ===
Best Edited Half-Hour Series for Television:

David Rogers and Claire Scanlon – The Office: "Finale"

- Meg Reticker and Ken Eluto – 30 Rock: "Hogcock! / Last Lunch"
- Kabir Akhtar and A.J. Dickerson – Arrested Development: "Flight of the Phoenix"

Best Edited One Hour Series for Commercial Television:

Skip MacDonald – Breaking Bad: "Felina"

- Skip MacDonald and Sharidan Williams-Sotelo – Breaking Bad: "Buried"
- Kelley Dixon and Chris McCaleb – Breaking Bad: "Granite State"
- Skip MacDonald – Breaking Bad: "Ozymandias"
- Scott Vickrey – The Good Wife: "Hitting the Fan"

Best Edited One Hour Series for Non-Commercial Television:

Terry Kelley – Homeland: "Big Man in Tehran"

- Oral Norrie Ottey – Game of Thrones: "The Rains of Castamere"
- Kirk Baxter – House of Cards: "Chapter 1"

Best Edited Mini-Series or Motion Picture for Television:

Mary Ann Bernard – Behind the Candelabra

- Stewart Schill – American Horror Story: Asylum: "The Name Game"
- Barbara Tulliver – Phil Spector

Best Edited Non-scripted series

Nick Brigden – Anthony Bourdain: Parts Unknown: Tokyo

- Rob Goubeaux, Mark S. Andrew, Paul J. Coyne, Jennifer Nelson, Martin Skibosh and Trevor Campbell – Beyond Scared Straight: "The Return of Hustle Man"
- Josh Earl, Alex Durham and Rob Butler – Deadliest Catch: "Mutiny on the Bering Sea"

=== Golden Eddie Filmmaker of the Year Award ===
Paul Greengrass

=== Career Achievement Award ===
- Richard Halsey
- Robert C. Jones

=== Heritage Award ===
Randy Roberts

=== Student Editing Award ===
Ambar Salinas – Video Symphony

- Kevin Cheung – Video Symphony
- Eric Kench - Video Symphony
- Noah Cody – American Film Institute
