= Nor'easter (American Horror Story) =

- American Horror Story episode
- Episode no.: Season 2 Episode 3
- Directed by: Michael Uppendahl
- Written by: Jennifer Salt
- Production code: 2ATS03
- Original air date: October 31, 2012
- Running time: 41 minutes

Guest appearances
- Chloë Sevigny as Shelley; Adam Levine as Leo Morrison; Jenna Dewan-Tatum as Teresa Morrison; Mark Consuelos as Spivey; Fredric Lehne as Frank McCann

Episode chronology
← Previous "Tricks and Treats"	Next → "I Am Anne Frank"
- American Horror Story: Asylum

"Nor'easter" is the third episode of the second season of the anthology television series American Horror Story, which premiered on October 31, 2012, on the cable network FX. The episode is written by Jennifer Salt and directed by Michael Uppendahl.

Nor'easter was nominated for a Primetime Emmy Award for Outstanding Single-Camera Picture Editing for a Miniseries or a Movie.

The episode focuses on the asylum's staff attempt to maintain order as a fierce storm hits the area, allowing some patients to try another escape. Chloë Sevigny guest stars as Shelley. The episode originally aired two days after Hurricane Sandy's U.S. landfall. This episode is rated TV-MA (LSV).

== Plot ==
Flashing forward to 2012, Teresa and Leo are running from Bloody Face. Bloody Face is knocked unconscious and stabbed, but while the couple attempt to escape, two armed Bloody Faces ambush them leaving mortally wounded. Another Bloody Face appears behind these two Bloody Faces.

Sister Mary Eunice gives Sister Jude a newspaper from 1949, with a story about a missing child that Jude had hit with her car. Mary Eunice announces that The Sign of the Cross will be shown to calm residents during a winter storm. Eunice then kills a woman who suspected she was possessed. Meanwhile, Dr. Arden inspects a wound on sanitarium resident Kit, who Arden suspects is a Stasi spy, and Lana asks Dr. Thredson to deliver a note to Wendy.

Jude accuses Arden of corrupting Mary Eunice, while he believes it to be Shelley and Jude's lack of control. While a radio announces the approaching storm and strange lights in the sky. Kit's removed implant mysteriously rattles in a jar.

Thredson tells of his visit to Wendy's empty house to Lana. He reports that he believes Wendy to have been murdered due to similarities between her empty house and the scenes of the other Bloody Face murder victims. During the presentation of The Sign of the Cross, Mary Eunice revels in Christian persecution segments, while Shelley, Lana, Grace, and Kit sneak out to begin their escape. Jude searches the ward for the missing suspicious female patient and sees an alien in a lightning flash.

Three escapees giddily reach the outside, but Arden catches Shelley. Grace, Kit, and Lana discuss heading for the main road. The Raspers force the three escapees to return inside the asylum tunnel. Mary Eunice fetches Jude to tell her of the escape. Jude shuts down the movie, and any other future group events.

In his laboratory, after a failed attempt to rape Shelley, Arden informs her that she is being blamed as the instigator of the escape attempt and everyone believes she is outside the asylum. He then reveals he has amputated both of her legs.

== Production ==
"Nor'easter" was written by co-executive producer Jennifer Salt, while Mad Men veteran Michael Uppendahl served as director.

In a November 2012 interview with Entertainment Weekly, series creator Ryan Murphy spoke on several episode topics. About the timing of the episode's airdate with Hurricane Sandy's landfall, he said, "It's very strange and somewhat sad. We wrote this script I think in June. We based it on several big 50s and 60s Nor'easters that hit the East Coast, obviously not as severe as the one that just hit. It's very eerie." About Jessica Lange's performance, he said, "She's never really played a drunkard in her career so her doing this big drunk monologue that has both comedy and tragedy sometimes within a single minute and I think she just killed it. I think its really brilliant and tragic and it contains my favorite line she's ever said, which is 'Charles Laughton is an enormous whoopsie.' I thought that was really quite brilliant. Jessica Lange talking about Charles Laughton is just great. I know it was very challenging and she had a great time doing it. It was just a master class in acting."

== Reception ==
"Nor'easter" was watched by 2.47 million viewers, receiving an adult 18-49 rating of 1.5, the highest numbers for cable television of the night.

Rotten Tomatoes reports a 91% approval rating, based on 11 reviews. The critical consensus reads, ""Nor'easter" tightens the focus on plot, while maintaining its trademark campy, scary thrills." Emily VanDerWerff of The A.V. Club gave the episode a B rating, stating, ""Nor'easter" is the weakest episode of the season so far, but it also has more than enough wacky shit going on to keep me entertained." Amy Amatangelo of Paste gave it a 6.5 out 10 rating, stating, "American Horror Story: Asylum is a completely wackadoodle series. This we know. But even when I accept this premise, the drama still sends me over the edge with its utter ridiculousness. Everything was completely over-the-top in "Nor'easter"."
