= The Name Game (American Horror Story) =

- American Horror Story episode
- Episode no.: Season 2 Episode 10
- Directed by: Michael Lehmann
- Written by: Jessica Sharzer
- Production code: 2ATS10
- Original air date: January 2, 2013
- Running time: 40 minutes

Guest appearances
- Frances Conroy as The Angel of Death; Mark Consuelos as Spivey; Barbara Tarbuck as Mother Superior Claudia; Naomi Grossman as Pepper; Mark Engelhardt as Carl; Gloria Laino as The Mexican; Ezra Buzzington as Sedated Patient

Episode chronology
| ← Previous "The Coat Hanger" | Next → "Spilt Milk" |
- American Horror Story: Asylum

"The Name Game" is the tenth episode of the second season of the FX anthology television series American Horror Story. The episode, written by Jessica Sharzer and directed by Michael Lehmann, originally aired on January 2, 2013. The episode is named for the 1964 song of the same name by Shirley Ellis, which is performed by the cast in the episode. The cast version of "The Name Game" was available for purchase through iTunes. This episode is rated TV-MA (LSV).

In the episode, Dr. Arden (James Cromwell) puts an end to his experiments; Kit (Evan Peters) and Lana (Sarah Paulson) continue to pressure the killer Dr. Thredson (Zachary Quinto), who reveals several secrets to Kit; now a patient and known by her common name, Judy Martin, Sister Jude (Jessica Lange) gets subjected to the asylum's inhumane treatments; and Monsignor Howard (Joseph Fiennes) takes the fight to the possessed Sister Mary Eunice (Lily Rabe).

== Plot ==
Dr. Arden revives Kit. Arden, who has placed Grace in his laboratory, lies to Kit that the aliens did not visit. Pepper was also taken by the aliens and has been assigned to protect Grace, and has been made more intelligent by them.

After Monsignor Timothy Howard is injured from being crucified, he has been told by Shachath that he must help her force the Devil out of Sister Mary Eunice, but he must keep his thoughts of doing so hidden from the nun.

During a room check, Judy acts rebellious to Mary Eunice and is taken to Arden for electroconvulsive therapy. Arden allows Mary Eunice to work the controls; she sets them past his requested amount and turns on the machine, seriously inhibiting Jude's mental capacity. While Mary Eunice changes Timothy's bandages, he attempts to perform an exorcism. Mary Eunice then rapes him.

Timothy says to Jude she was correct about Mary Eunice being possessed. She tells him to kill Mary Eunice, who later admits of knowing his plan to cast out the Devil. He is able to draw out the human part of Mary Eunice, who wishes she could die. He throws her from the top of the stairs. Shachath comes to claim both Sister Mary Eunice and the Devil.

Dr. Thredson finds Pepper monitoring Grace, who is almost ready to deliver the baby. Thredson later takes Kit to an office, where Grace is holding her newborn baby. Grace confirms that the baby is Kit's. Thredson goes to where Kit hid the recording of Thredson's confession, but cannot find it. Lana tells him only she knows where the tape is now, threatening to turn it over to the police should anything happen to Kit or anyone else.

Judy asks Mother Superior Claudia to get Lana out of the asylum.

Timothy performs last rites on Mary Eunice, with Arden attending. Arden requests she be cremated. Alone, Arden later prepares the furnace for the cremation. He climbs on top of Mary Eunice's body as she enters the furnace, and starts the conveyor to immolate himself.

== Production ==
"The Name Game" was written by co-executive producer Jessica Sharzer and directed by Bored to Death veteran Michael Lehmann.

In a January 2013 interview with Entertainment Weekly, series creator Ryan Murphy spoke about the titular dance scene and the allusion to his other series Glee, "I never thought about Glee when we were doing it. The fun of it, I think, is that you're in Sister Jude's shock therapy-induced fantasy. The idea was to really do a musical number that was something very '60s crossed with Jacob's Ladder because it was in her head and it was sort of the beginning of her descent."

Murphy also commented on the final scene and Dr. Arden immolating himself, "Our version of that character was his whole life was someone who really thought he was not capable of love and to do all the inhuman acts that he did, he had hardened himself. I think when he felt that part of his heart open up and to have it close again was devastating. I also think the image of a Nazi doctor going into an oven is sort of a brilliant metaphor of him literally paying. Obviously, he's a terrible character but I thought his end was very justified and somewhat poetic."

Lily Rabe commented on expecting the death of her character Sister Mary Eunice, "It's sort of part of being on this show is you know sort of toward the end of this season there's a high likelihood that's gonna happen. Then I did know when that was going to happen as things moved along. It wasn't toward later I knew when and how because it wasn't all known early on." She also spoke about doing her own stunts for the death scene, "I did them all! I worked with this incredible stunt double on a couple of things and she was able to work on this job. I had never done wires before. She did some incredible stuff too but I was able to do the whole thing. I was able to do the throw and the fall...I love that stuff. So it's scary to me in the way I love to be scared. I have a little bit of a thrill-seeker in me."

About her work on the series, Rabe said, "That twisted art sense of humor is right up my alley. I think both seasons of the show have had a lot of laughs – I know it might not be that way with everybody. I did have a lot of fun with that. Being so cruel to people, it's similarly painful to Nora [from the first season] where I was suffering from so much heartbreak and loss and pain. It's a different kind of pain where you are literally the Devil. You just sort of lose your soul and detach. But that's also really fun so there's no complaining about going through that kind of pain because it's what gets me out of the bed in the morning, to play parts like that. I even got to sing and dance! I couldn't believe my luck! I felt very very lucky and in love with the part and I got to do so many different things."

== Reception ==
"The Name Game" was watched by 2.21 million viewers and received an adult 18-49 rating of 1.2, down slightly from the previously aired episode.

Rotten Tomatoes reports a 100% approval rating, based on 17 reviews. The critical consensus reads, "The action-filled "The Name Game" raises questions, offers closure to a couple of wicked characters, and climaxes with a shocking scene." Matt Fowler of IGN thought "The Name Game" was "jarringly good", adding that the episode "despite its dalliance with a Glee-inspired dance-macabre number, gave us some big game-changing deaths. It heaped a ton of woe onto Jude and Timothy, giving them both powerful ways to atone for their past misdeeds." Emily VanDerWerff of The A.V. Club called the episode "a strong return for the show...one of the show's less crazy outings." She called the titular musical sequence "one of the most deliriously wonderful things I've seen in a long, long time."
