= Barbara Tarbuck =

American actress

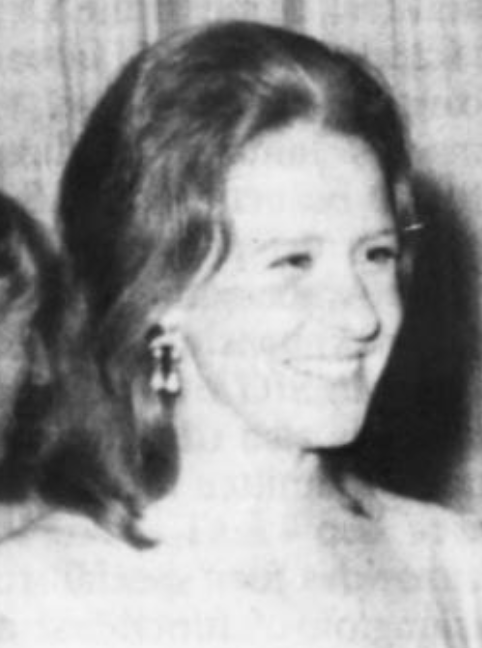
- Barbara Tarbuck in 1968
- Born: January 15, 1942; Detroit, Michigan, U.S.
- Died: December 26, 2016 (aged 74); Los Angeles, California, U.S.
- Education: Wayne State University; University of Michigan
- Occupation: Actress
- Years active: 1978–2016
- Spouse: James Denis Connolly (m. 1980; died 2005)
- Children: 1

Barbara Tarbuck (January 15, 1942 – December 26, 2016) was an American film, television, and stage actress from Detroit, Michigan, best known for her recurring role as Lady Jane Jacks on General Hospital.

== Life and career ==
Tarbuck was born in Detroit, Michigan. From the ages of 9–13, Tarbuck performed as a regular on the children's series Storyland, which aired on the Detroit AM radio station WWJ. From there, she learned acting skills from veteran actors on radio shows such as The Lone Ranger, The Shadow and The Green Hornet.

Tarbuck attended Cooley High School and Wayne State University. Upon winning the Eva Woodbridge Victor Scholarship, she finished her Bachelors in 1963. While in college, she participated in the production of Where's Charley, which toured through Europe. She also earned her master's degree in Theatre from the University of Michigan. She then went to Indiana University Bloomington to work as the lead actress in their inaugural theatre touring company season.

She began to work on her PhD and taught beginning acting. While at Indiana University, she was granted a Fulbright Scholarship to the London Academy of Music and Dramatic Art. She then moved to New York City to pursue her acting career in stage, film, and television productions. In her later career, alongside her acting roles, she taught acting at University of California, Los Angeles.

She married James Denis Connolly in 1980; he died in 2005. They had one child, Jennifer Lane Connolly, who is a documentary producer.

Tarbuck developed the neurodegenerative Creutzfeldt–Jakob disease and died due to complications at her Los Angeles home on December 26, 2016.

== Film ==
Year	Title	Role	Notes
1979	Night-Flowers	Arlene	
1986	Short Circuit	Sen. Mills	
1986	Big Trouble	Helen	
1990	The Death of the Incredible Hulk	Amy Pratt	
1991	Curly Sue	Mrs. Arnold	
1993	Midnight Witness	Lucy	
1995	The Tie That Binds	Jean Bennett	
2002	The Legend of Razorback	Mirna Small	
2003	Tulse Luper Suitcases: The Moab Story	Ma Fender	
2004	Walking Tall	Connie Vaughn	
2007	Gone	Cassandra Windemere	
2008	Wednesday Again	Rose	
2009	S. Darko	Agatha	
2014	The Painting	Professor Edna	
2015	Come Simi	Lisa	(final film role)

== Television ==
Year	Title	Role	Notes
1979	The Waltons	Saleslady	Episode: "The Parting"
1979	The Incredible Hulk	3rd Nurse	2 episodes
1979	Charlie's Angels	Frau Himbeere	Episode: "Rosemary, For Remembrance"
1979	Dallas	Agnes	3 episodes
1980	CBS Afternoon Playhouse	Marion	Episode: "Lost in Death Valley"
1980	Knots Landing	Sales clerk	Episode: "Courageous Convictions"
1981	Little House on the Prairie	Beth Tomkins	Episode: "The Lost Ones - Part 2"
1982	M*A*S*H	Maj. Judy "Parallel" Parker	Episode: "Run for the Money"
1982	Police Squad!	Mrs. Twice	Episode: "A Substantial Gift (The Broken Promise)"
1982	Newhart	Ms. Fletcher	Episode: "No Tigers at the Circus"
1982–1986	Dynasty	Dr. Holton	2 episodes
1983	St. Elsewhere	Agnes Najinksy	Episode: "All About Eve"
1983	Cagney & Lacey	Mrs. Grady	Episode: "Hopes and Dreams"
1984-1985	Cagney & Lacey	Thelma Samuels	2 episodes Episodes: "Matinee" and "The Clinic"
1985	The Twilight Zone	Sarita Rosenthal	Episode: "One Life, Furnished in Early Poverty"
1986–1987	Falcon Crest	Dr. Randal	7 episodes
1987	The Golden Girls	Martha McDowell	Episode: "To Catch a Neighbor"
1987	Highway to Heaven	Marie Briggs	Episode: "A Night to Remember"
1987	Knots Landing	Mrs. Schumacher	Episode: "Missing Persons"
1988	Hunter	Judge Ruth Loomis	Episode: "Boomerang"
1989	L.A. Law	Dr. Nagel	Episode: "His Suit Is Hirsute"
1989	Moonlighting	Maddie's Classmate	Episode: "Eine Kleine Nacht Murder "
1989	21 Jump Street	Judge Irene Pagota	Episode: "Come from the Shadows"
1990	The Outsiders	Tim's mother	Episode: "Only the Lonely"
1990	Dragnet	Martha	Episode: "Copy Cat"
1990	Santa Barbara	Sister Allegra	9 episodes
1991	Star Trek: The Next Generation	Governor Leka Trion	Episode: "The Host"
1991–1992	Civil Wars	Judge Kaplan	2 episodes
1992	Quantum Leap	Esther	Episode: "Roberto! - January 27, 1982"
1992	Picket Fences	Myra	Episode: "Remembering Rosemary"
1996–2010	General Hospital	Lady Jane Jacks	41 episodes
1997	The Practice	Judge Emily Strong	Episode: "Part V"
1999	ER	Alice Presley	Episode: "Choosing Joi"
2000	CSI: Crime Scene Investigation	Paige Harmon	2 episodes
2001	Judging Amy	Dr. Cody	Episode: "Hold on Tight"
2002	Star Trek: Enterprise	Chancellor Kalev	Episode: "Shadows of P'Jem"
2002	Six Feet Under	STD Clinic Doctor	Episode: "In the Game"
2003	NYPD Blue	Barbara Colohan	3 episodes
2003	Without a Trace	Unknown	2 episodes
2003	Cold Case	Helen Holtz	Episode: "A Time to Hate"
2004	NCIS	Mrs. Donaldson	Episode: "UnSEALeD"
2004	Nip/Tuck	Mrs. Declan	Episode: "Naomi Ganes"
2005	Medium	Carol Waller Smith	Episode: "Time Out of Mind"
2005	CSI: NY	Vivian Claven	Episode: "Dancing with the Fishes"
2007	Journeyman	Grandmother Vasser	Episode: "Home by Another Way"
2011	Glee	Nancy Bletheim	Episode: "The Purple Piano Project"
2012–2013	American Horror Story: Asylum	Mother Superior Claudia	5 episodes
2013	Mad Men	Hazel Tinsley	Episode: "The Doorway, Part 2"
2013	Dexter	Sussman's mother	Episode: "Every Silver Lining..."

== Theatre ==
Year	Title	Role	Notes
1970	Landscape and Silence		
1978	The Water Engine		
1984	Brighton Beach Memoirs	Kate Jerome	
