= Britne Oldford =

Canadian actress (b. 1992)

- Born: Toronto, Ontario, Canada
- Occupation: Actress
- Years active: 2009–present

Britne Oldford is a Canadian-American actress best known for a variety of roles, including portraying Cadie Campbell on Skins, Alma Walker on American Horror Story: Asylum, Remy Beaumont on Ravenswood, Regan on Hunters, Missy in Free Guy (2021), and Fei Hargreeves / Sparrow Number Three in The Umbrella Academy (2022). She played Genevieve Cotard in the Peabody Award-winning miniseries Dead Ringers, which premiered on Amazon Prime Video in 2023.

== Filmography ==
Film
Year	Title	Role	Notes
2013	Darkroom	Jean	
2013	36 Saints	Eve	
2014	Loitering with Intent	Izzy	
2014	Happy Birthday!	Lucia	
2014	Hunter&Game	Hip Girl 1	
2015	How He Fell in Love	Monica	
2016	AWOL	Haley	
2019	Bushwick Beats	Harlow	
2021	Free Guy	Missy	
2024	Which Brings Me to You	Audrey	

Television
Year	Title	Role	Notes
2009	The Latest Buzz	Josie	Episode: "The Double Trouble Issue"
2011	Skins	Cadie Campbell	Main cast
2012	Robot Chicken	Linka (voice) / Raisin Groupie (voice)	Episode: "Hurtled from a Helicopter Into a Speeding Train"
2012–2013	American Horror Story: Asylum	Alma Walker	Recurring role
2013–2014	Ravenswood	Remy Beaumont	Main cast
2014	The Divide	Jenny Butler	Main cast
2015–2019	The Flash	Shawna Baez / Peek-a-Boo	4 episodes
2015	Mix	Remy	Backdoor pilot, did not go to series
2016	Hunters	Regan	Main cast Nominated - Golden Maple Award for Best actress in a TV series broadcast in the U.S.
2017	The Path	Noa	Recurring role (season 2)
2018-2019	Blindspot	Claudia Murphy	2 Episodes
2018	Deception	Lexi Simone	Episode: "Black Art"
2020	Bull	Ronnie Vincent	Episode: "Prison Break"
2022	The Umbrella Academy	Fei Hargreeves / Sparrow Number Three	Main cast (season 3)
2023	Dead Ringers	Genevieve	Main cast
2023	Winning Time: The Rise of the Lakers Dynasty	Lisa Adams	Episode: "One Ring Don't Make a Dynasty"
2025	Long Bright River	Dr. Aura Williams	Recurring role
2025	Sirens	Missy	Recurring role
2025–2026	Elsbeth	Detective Nina Taylor	2 episodes
