= Jake Bongiovi =

American model (born 2002)

- Born: Jacob Hurley Bongiovi; May 7, 2002 (age 24); New Jersey, U.S.
- Occupations: Model; actor
- Years active: 2022–present
- Spouse: Millie Bobby Brown (m. 2024)
- Children: 2
- Father: Jon Bon Jovi
- Relatives: Tony Bongiovi (second cousin once removed)

Jacob Hurley Bongiovi (born May 7, 2002) is an American model and actor. He is the son of rock musician Jon Bon Jovi.

== Early life ==
Jacob Hurley Bongiovi was born on May 7, 2002, in New Jersey, U.S., and raised in Middletown Township, New Jersey. He is the son of musician Jon Bon Jovi and Dorothea Hurley and has three siblings. He attended Poly Prep Country Day School in Brooklyn. Bongiovi attended The Pennington School, where he played on the football team. He attended Syracuse University in 2020 but dropped out after his first year to pursue acting.

== Career ==
Bongiovi made his acting debut as part of the cast in the romantic comedy Sweethearts, directed by Jordan Weiss. Filming wrapped on the project in August 2022. In February 2023, he was cast in Todd Tucker's musical film Rockbottom alongside McKaley Miller and Teala Dunn, which follows a fictitious 1980s hair metal band CougarSnake, centered on lead actor Tom Everett Scott. Bongiovi's character Justin is a potential lead singer who must first overcome stage fright.

As a model, Bongiovi is signed with William Morris Endeavor and IMG Models. In 2022, Bongiovi starred in a video for fashion brand Versace.

== Personal life ==
Since 2021, Bongiovi has been in a relationship with British actress Millie Bobby Brown. They made their red-carpet debut together in March 2022 at the BAFTA Awards. The couple announced their engagement in April 2023, by both making posts to their respective Instagram accounts. News of the engagement was reported as going quickly viral by Newsweek in April 2023, with media discussion of the young ages of Bongiovi (20) and Brown (19) at the time. In May 2024, the couple married in a private ceremony. In August 2025, Bongiovi and Brown announced they had welcomed their first child, a baby girl, through adoption. In September 2026, People reported that the couple adopted a second child, a baby boy.

== Filmography ==
=== Film ===
Year	Title	Role	Notes
2024	Rockbottom	Justin	
2024	Action Juice	—N/a	Short film; director
2024	Sweethearts	Kellan	
2025	Poetic License	Julian Bende	Post-production
2026	Enola Holmes 3	—N/a	Post-production; executive producer
TBA	Just Picture It	—N/a	Post-production; executive producer
