= Rockbottom =

American musical film

- Directed by: Todd Tucker
- Screenplay by: Todd Tucker; Greg Zekowski; Ronald L. Halvas
- Produced by: Noam Dromi; Greg Zekowski; Kathy Macias; Ronald L. Halvas
- Starring: Tom Everett Scott; McKaley Miller; Jake Bongiovi; Brandon Butler; Teala Dunn
- Cinematography: Greg Gardiner; Morgan Gardiner
- Edited by: Jeff Murphy
- Production companies: Halvas; Illusion Industries
- Release date: March 28, 2024
- Running time: 82 minutes
- Country: United States
- Language: English

Rockbottom is a 2024 American musical film about the fictitious rock band CougarSnake. It was co-written and directed by Todd Tucker and stars Tom Everett Scott, McKaley Miller, Jake Bongiovi, Brandon Butler and Teala Dunn. The film was released in March 2024.

== Premise ==
Music superstar Bryce Cooper tries to get 1980s rock band CougarSnake to reform and join his charity concert.

== Cast ==
- Brandon Butler as Bryce Cooper
- Tom Everett Scott as Jesse
- McKaley Miller as Alex
- Teala Dunn as Kat
- Jake Bongiovi as Justin

== Production ==
The film was co-written and directed by Todd Tucker who was a musician in a rock band in the 1980s himself. Production came from Halvas and Illusion Industries with Noam Dromi, Greg Zekowski, Kathy Macias and Ronald L. Halvas as producers.

The cast includes Tom Everett Scott, McKaley Miller, Teala Dunn, Brandon Butler, and Jake Bongiovi as a pizza boy turned singer.

== Release ==
The film became available to stream on demand on March 28, 2024.
