= Camera Shy (Dexter: Resurrection) =

Second episode of Dexter: Resurrection

- Dexter: Resurrection episode
- Episode no.: Season 1 Episode 2
- Directed by: Marcos Siega
- Written by: Scott Buck
- Cinematography by: Joe Collins
- Editing by: Katie Ennis
- Original air date: July 11, 2025
- Running time: 47 minutes

Guest appearances
- David Magidoff as Teddy Reed; Marc Menchaca as Red; Bryan Lillis as Ryan Foster; Max von Essen as The Canton Clubber; Jason Alan Carvell as Stefan Pike; McKaley Miller as Shauna; Darius Jordan Lee as Lance Thomas; JillMarie Lawrence as Constance Kamara; Reese Antoinette as Joy; Oberon K. A. Adjepong as Chike

Episode chronology
| ← Previous "A Beating Heart..." | Next → "Backseat Driver" |

"Camera Shy" is the second episode of the American crime drama mystery television series Dexter: Resurrection, sequel to Dexter and Dexter: New Blood. The episode was written by consulting producer Scott Buck, and directed by executive producer Marcos Siega. It was released on Paramount+ with Showtime on July 11, 2025, and aired on Showtime two days later.

The series is set following the events of Dexter: New Blood, and it follows Dexter Morgan, who has recovered from his near-fatal gunshot wound. After realizing that his son Harrison is now working as a hotel bellhop in New York City, he sets out to find him. During this, his old friend Angel Batista returns to talk with Dexter over unfinished business. In the episode, Dexter tries to get close to Harrison, while also investigating a serial killer who targets rideshare drivers.

The episode received mostly positive reviews from critics, who praised the performances and character development, although some were mixed over the episode's slow pacing.

== Plot ==
A suspicious man boards a rideshare drive, where he starts a conversation with the driver, Stanley. Stanley is then notified that the man is not his passenger, and the man garrotes him. He forces Stanley to drive to a location. The following morning, the driver is found decapitated in his car.

Dexter sneaks into The Empire Hotel and investigates the room Ryan was murdered in. He is perplexed at how well Harrison cleaned the scene. Detectives Oliva and Wallace enter the room and Dexter hides. Wallace notes that the room has been very thoroughly cleaned, deciding to check other hotel rooms to confirm the theory. After everyone leaves, Dexter investigates the kitchen where Harrison dismembered Ryan and cleans any tracks left by his son. After his truck is towed, Dexter is forced to call a rideshare driver. During the ride, the friendly driver, Blessing Kamara, explains that a serial killer has been targeting rideshare drivers, and to Dexter's surprise, the killer is nicknamed "The Dark Passenger".

Charley stalks a serial killer, The Canton Clubber, who she kills for violating terms of an arrangement. Harrison begins to feel guilt over Ryan's murder, and is haunted by the memory of shooting Dexter. Trying to move on, Harrison sells the truck that he gave him. Angel meets with Teddy to discuss Dexter's possible whereabouts.

Hoping to find more about the killer, Dexter accepts Blessing's invitation to a house party with his friends. There, he talks with a man who survived his encounter with the serial killer. The man tells Dexter that the killer bore a resemblance to Dexter. He shows Dexter dashcam footage of the encounter, but the killer, having been wearing a camera-shy hoodie, is unable to be identified. Blessing convinces Dexter to move into a vacant basement apartment under his own. Dexter buys a new car and, in order to pursue the killer, acquires a job as a rideshare driver.

On the dashcam footage Dexter sees that the killer had a backpack with the logo of a cybersecurity company. Scrolling through the list of employees, he notes Ronald Schmidt, who has no online presence. Stalking him, he identifies Ronald by noticing his camera-shy hoodie. Just as Ronald prepares to board a rideshare drive, Dexter approaches and claims the ride is for him, prompting Ronald to leave. Harry notes that Dexter prioritized the safety of Ronald's next victim rather than kill him, which is unusual for him.

== Production ==
=== Development ===
The episode was written by consulting producer Scott Buck, and directed by executive producer Marcos Siega. This marked Buck's first writing credit, and Siega's second directing credit.

== Reception ==
"Camera Shy" received mostly positive reviews from critics. Louis Peitzman of Vulture gave the episode a 3 star rating out of 5 and wrote, "This may be sacrilege to those of you who prefer the binge model of television, but I'm always a little annoyed when shows premiere with more than one episode. First of all, it's a big ask and second of all, it often feels like a way to drag out the table setting. That's certainly the case with “Camera Shy,” which struck me as surprisingly slow after the propulsive premiere. Yes, it's too early in the Dexter: Resurrection season for any of the inevitable confrontations ahead, but if you keep showing tantalizing glimpses of Uma Thurman's serial-killer recruiter, Charley, I'm going to ask when we’re getting to the fireworks factory."

Shawn Van Horn of Collider gave the episode a 7 out of 10 rating and wrote, "Harry tells Dexter that he put everything at risk to save someone rather than to kill someone. Wanting to know when that started, Dexter tells him now. Is he developing human feelings? Not enough, because a voiceover tells us that his kill table is ready." Matthew Wilkinson of Game Rant wrote, "Given that the trailer gave away the idea of multiple serial killers, this was certainly an interesting moment that seems to give a wink at what's to come for Dexter: Resurrection, in what was another impressive episode of the show." Mads Misasi of Telltale TV wrote, "All in all, these two episodes give us a very strong start to what will either be a strong, but risky shift in tone, or will fall apart the further we explore this new setting."

Greg MacArthur of Screen Rant wrote, "Ultimately, the first two episodes of Dexter: Resurrection deliver exactly what the franchise needed and what fans have been dying to see. They exceed expectations and set up what is already feeling like one of the greatest Dexter seasons ever made." Carissa Pavlica of TV Fanatic gave the episode a 4 star rating out of 5 and wrote, "Episode 2 offers more humor, more tension, and even more ridiculousness than the premiere. And I mean that as a compliment."
