= The Terror of Hallow's Eve =

- Film poster
- Directed by: Todd Tucker
- Screenplay by: Zack Ward
- Produced by: Ronald L. Halvas
- Starring: Caleb Thomas
- Music by: Jeffrey Alan Jones; Chris Walden; John Carpenter
- Release date: August 28, 2017 (London FrightFest)
- Running time: 1h 16min
- Country: United States
- Language: English

The Terror of Hallow's Eve is a 2017 American horror film directed by Todd Tucker and starring Caleb Thomas. Tim, a fifteen-year-old boy, wishes to seek revenge on a gang of bullies after they beat him brutally. However, the heinous trickster who helps Tim seeks a heavy price for his aid.

== Cast ==
- Caleb Thomas as Tim Stevens
- Doug Jones as Trickster / Scarecrow
- Sarah Lancaster as Linda Stevens
- Annie Read as April
- J.T. Neal as Brian
- McAbe Gregg as "Spaz"
- Niko Papastefanou as Chuck
- Eric Roberts as Ed
- Juliet Landau as Nurse Pryse / Banshee In Shadows
- Peter Jason as Dr. Hamilton
- Christian Kane

== Release ==
The film premiered at the London FrightFest Film Festival on August 28, 2017. It was then released in the United States via Redbox on December 11, 2018.

== Reception ==
The film has a 70% rating on Rotten Tomatoes. Jeremy Aspinall of Radio Times awarded the film two stars out of five. Gareth Jones of Dread Central awarded the film three stars out of five. Benedict Seal of Bloody Disgusting awarded the film three and a half skulls out of five.

== See also ==
- List of films set around Halloween
