= Nikki Hahn =

American actress

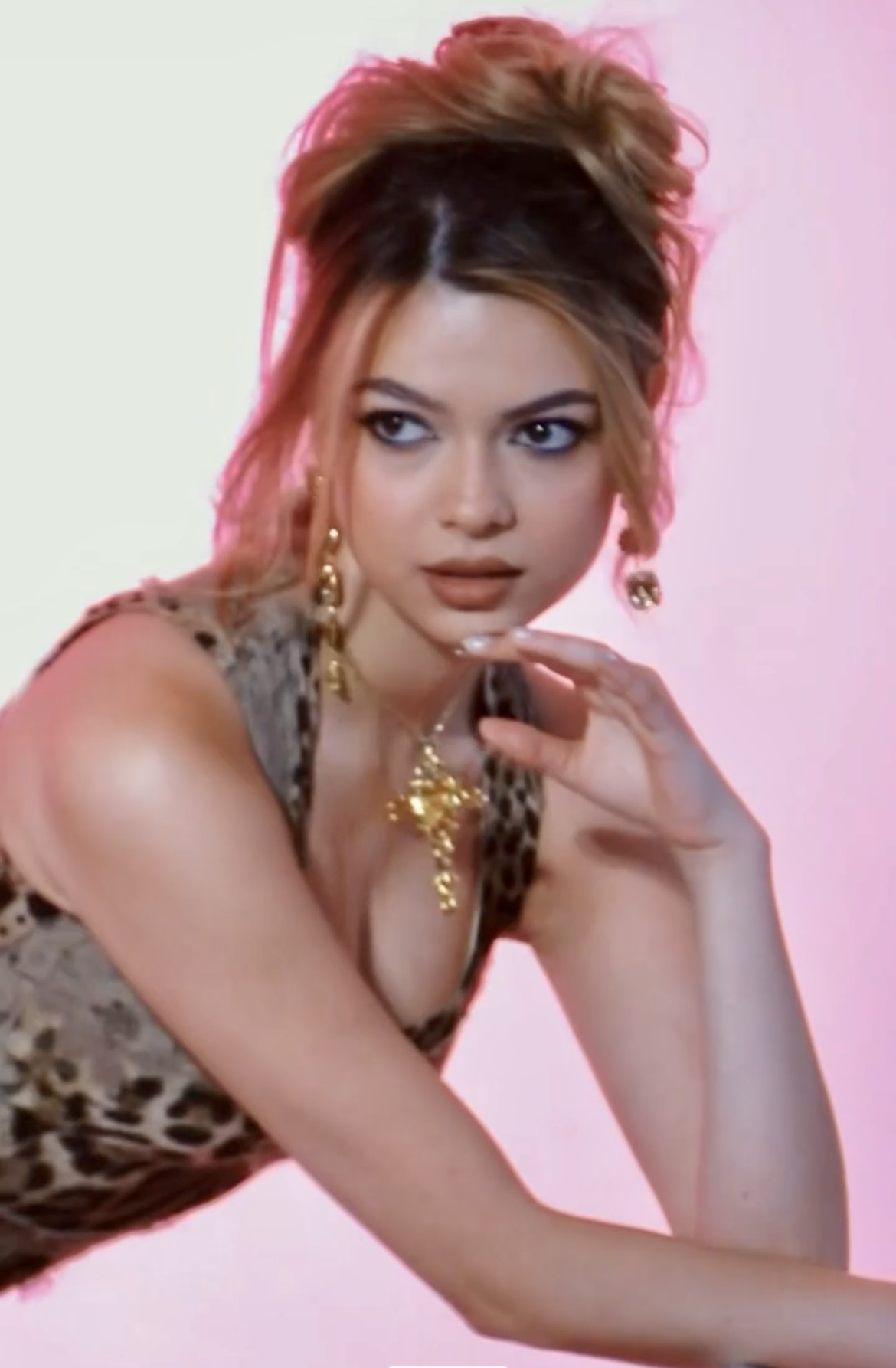
- Hahn in 2024
- Born: Sofia Nicole Hahn; November 13, 2002 (age 23); San Antonio, Texas, U.S.
- Occupations: Actress, singer, songwriter
- Years active: 2009–present

Sofia Nicole Hahn (born November 13, 2002) is an American actress. She is known for her role as Emily Cooper in the comedy film Adventures in Babysitting (2016), among other television roles.

== Life and career ==
Hahn began her career as a child model at the age of 3, and began working commercially at the age of 4.

Soon after, she began guest-starring in television shows. In 2009, Hahn appeared in CSI: Miami as Maggie Rush, a little girl whose mother was trying to regain custody of her, and in NCIS: Los Angeles as Elly Johnson, a young girl whose uncle was a suspect in a murder investigation. In 2010, Hahn had a small roles in iCarly and Criminal Minds. She also was seen in The Closer as Cody Tatem, a girl whose mother, a drug addict, possibly committed suicide.

In 2011, Hahn was seen as Tom Hanks' daughter, Sophie, a young pageant girl that appears on the show, Toddlers & Tiaras, in a comedy skit for Jimmy Kimmel Live!, as well as another comedy skit playing Topher Grace's childhood friend in a Pie Face commercial. In the summer of 2011, Hahn played Maria Valseca opposite Teri Polo and Esai Morales in the Lifetime movie, We Have Your Husband, which is based on the book, We Have Your Husband: One Woman's Terrifying Story of a Kidnapping in Mexico, by Jayne Garcia Valseca and Mark Ebner.

In January 2012, Hahn guest-starred in Disney's Jessie as Lindsay, and in the Wizards of Waverly Place television movie, The Wizards Return: Alex vs. Alex, as Bianca, Alex Russo's (Selena Gomez) Italian relative and young wizard in training. Hahn appeared in two Hallmark films: Matchmaker Santa, alongside Lacey Chabert; and Second Chances, with Alison Sweeney and Benjamin Stockham. Hahn also guest-starred as Jenny Reynolds, a mysterious little girl who is abandoned at the Briarcliff Asylum, in American Horror Story: Asylum. Hahn also appeared in the fourth season of ABC Family's Pretty Little Liars, and the first season of ABC Family's The Fosters as young Callie Jacob (Maia Mitchell).

In 2016, Hahn co-starred as Emily in the Disney Channel original movie Adventures In Babysitting, alongside Sabrina Carpenter and Sofia Carson. She also appeared in the horror film The Remains.

In 2018 and 2019, Hahn had a recurring role in the second season of American Housewife.

In 2023, Hahn booked the role of Faith in Hysteria! The Satanic Panic for Peacock (NBCUniversal). Hahn plays a sheltered teenage girl whose life is forever changed by a shocking, traumatic crime.

== Filmography ==
=== Film ===
Year	Title	Role	Notes
2014	Riding 79	Sunny	Film
2015	Venom Therapy	Greta Kiku Arata	Short film
2016	The Remains	Elena Tolwood	Film
2017	Scales: Mermaids Are Real	Crystal	Film

=== Television ===
Year	Title	Role	Notes
2009	CSI: Miami	Maggie Rush	Episode: "Collateral Damage"
2009	NCIS: Los Angeles	Elly Johnson	Episode: "Brimstone"
2010	iCarly	Kindergartener #3	Episode: "iFix a Pop Star"
2010	The Closer	Cody Tatem	Episode: "In Custody"
2010	Criminal Minds	Abby Sanderson	Episode: "25 to Life"
2011	Jimmy Kimmel Live!	Various (Note: Including Pie Face girl, Sophie Hanks, Marley & Me – The Puppy Years, and Katie Couric's kid.)	4 episodes
2011	Wilfred	Little Girl	Episode: "Acceptance"
2011	We Have Your Husband	Maria Valseca	Television film
2012	Childrens Hospital	Carrie	Episode: "The Return of the Young Billionaire"
2012	Jessie	Lindsay	Episode: "Beauty and The Beasts"
2012	Matchmaker Santa	Young Melanie	Television film (Hallmark)
2012	American Horror Story: Asylum	Jenny Reynolds	Episode: "The Origins of Monstrosity"
2013	Wizards of Waverly Place: Alex vs. Alex	Bianca Russo	Television film (Disney)
2013	Hart of Dixie	Loretta June	Television series
2013	Pretty Little Liars	Little Girl #2	Episode: "'A' Is for A-l-i-v-e"
2013	Second Chances	Maddie	Television film (Hallmark)
2014	The Fosters	10-Year-Old-Callie	Episode: "Padre"
2014	The Night Shift	Kylie	Episode: "Hog Wild"
2016	Adventures in Babysitting	Emily Cooper	Disney Channel Original Movie
2017	Genius	Young Mileva Marić	Episode: Chapter Two (Einstein)
2018–2019	American Housewife	Gina Tuscadero	Recurring role (8 episodes)
2021	Magnum P.I.	Amanda Davis	Episode: "Those We Leave Behind"
2024	Hysteria!	Faith	
