= Poetic License (film) =

American comedy film

- Directed by: Maude Apatow
- Written by: Raffi Donatich
- Produced by: Judd Apatow; Maude Apatow; Josh Church; Thalia Daniel; Will Greenfield; Benjamin Hung; Olivia Rosenbloom
- Starring: Leslie Mann; Andrew Barth Feldman; Cooper Hoffman; Nico Parker; Maisy Stella; Method Man; Martha Kelly; Jake Bongiovi
- Cinematography: Jeffrey Waldron
- Edited by: Jay Cassidy
- Music by: Jeff Morrow
- Production companies: Apatow Productions; August Night; Jewelbox Pictures
- Distributed by: Sony Pictures Classics
- Release date: September 6, 2025 (TIFF)
- Running time: 117 minutes
- Country: United States
- Language: English

Poetic License is a 2025 American comedy film directed by Maude Apatow in her feature directorial debut and written by Raffi Donatich. It stars Leslie Mann, Andrew Barth Feldman, Cooper Hoffman, Nico Parker, Maisy Stella, Method Man, Martha Kelly and Jake Bongiovi. The film follows Liz Cassidy, a former therapist who befriends two college seniors, Ari Zimmer and Sam Solomon, whose friendship becomes strained when both develop feelings for her.

The film had its world premiere in the Special Presentations section of the 2025 Toronto International Film Festival on September 6, 2025 to generally positive reviews. The film is planned for a theatrical release in 2027.

== Plot ==
Liz Cassidy, a former therapist and mother, moves with her family to a small college town after her husband, James, accepts a teaching position there. Struggling with the move and becoming increasingly distant from her teenage daughter, Dora.

Liz begins auditing a poetry class at the local college. There she meets Ari Zimmer and Sam Solomon, two longtime best friends and college seniors with contrasting personalities and plans for their futures.

Liz gradually forms a friendship with Ari and Sam, spending more time with them outside of class. As the three grow closer, both Ari and Sam develop romantic feelings for Liz. Their mutual attraction to her creates tension between the longtime friends, and their previously close relationship becomes increasingly competitive.

Ari invites Liz to his apartment to spend time together, but Sam unexpectedly arrives and joins them. The three drink and take hallucinogens, spending the night together as their friendship deepens. Despite Ari and Sam’s growing attraction to Liz, neither crosses a romantic boundary with her.

As Ari and Sam continue competing for Liz’s attention, their rivalry begins to damage their friendship. What initially appears to be playful competition becomes increasingly serious, exposing tensions and insecurities between the two men as graduation approaches.

Meanwhile, Dora becomes suspicious of Liz’s friendship with Ari and Sam, particularly after nearly encountering her mother at a college party. Sam’s girlfriend, Grace, also becomes uncomfortable with the friendship and questions why Sam and Ari are spending so much time with Liz.

Liz eventually realizes that both Ari and Sam have developed feelings for her. She has difficult conversations with them about their attraction, while making clear that she does not intend to pursue a romantic relationship with either man.

Despite the conflict caused by their feelings for Liz, Ari and Sam eventually reconcile and preserve their friendship.

== Cast ==
- Andrew Barth Feldman as Sam Soloman
- Cooper Hoffman as Ari Zimmer
- Leslie Mann as Liz Cassidy
- Nico Parker as Dora Cassidy, Liz's daughter
- Maisy Stella as Grace Wilson
- Method Man as James Cassidy, Liz's partner
- Martha Kelly as Professor Greta Ellis
- Jake Bongiovi as Julian Bende
- Will Price as Max

== Production ==
Poetic License was the first film produced by Jewelbox Pictures, the production company founded by Apatow and Olivia Rosenbloom.

Apatow sought to create a collaborative environment during filming, an approach she said she adopted from her father, Judd Apatow, whose sets encouraged actors to take creative risks. She wanted the film’s comedy to feel grounded and natural rather than forced, and the cast performed extensive improvisation and alternate takes while Apatow continued rewriting material throughout production. Hoffman and Feldman similarly described the production as highly collaborative.

Apatow said that aspects of Donatich’s screenplay reminded her of her relationship with her mother, Leslie Mann, and that she had Mann in mind for the role of Liz while developing the film.

Apatow cited filmmakers James L. Brooks and Cameron Crowe as influences on the film, saying that she wanted Poetic License to have a nostalgic quality while still feeling fresh and modern.

Apatow considered the chemistry between Hoffman and Feldman particularly important because much of the film depended on the friendship between their characters, Ari and Sam.

In October 2024, it was announced that Andrew Barth Feldman, Cooper Hoffman, Leslie Mann and Nico Parker were cast in the film. In November that same year, it was announced that Maisy Stella was also cast in the film.

Principal photography began on November 6, 2024, in Atlanta.

In November 2024, it was announced that Method Man, Martha Kelly and Will Price were cast in the film. In December that same year, it was announced that Jake Bongiovi was cast in the film.

In August 2025, it was announced that Jeff Morrow would compose the film's score.

== Release ==
Poetic License premiered during the Special Presentations section at the 2025 Toronto International Film Festival on September 6, 2025. Later that month, Row K Entertainment acquired North American distribution rights in a deal estimated at $5.5–7 million. It was previously scheduled to be released on May 15 and October 16, 2026. Row K's founders allegedly questioned the film's commercial potential, despite positive reviews. This lack of confidence contributed to pushing the release date several times. According to a Variety article, payments tied to the film might not have been fulfilled. Ultimately, in March 2026, Row K dropped the film, allowing its makers to shop it elsewhere. In July 2026, Sony Pictures Classics acquired worldwide distribution rights to the film, planning to release it sometime in 2027.

== Reception ==
On the review aggregator website Rotten Tomatoes, 92% of 26 critics' reviews are positive. The website's consensus reads: "Buoyed by sharp banter and standout performances, Poetic License marks an ambitious, refreshingly intellectual directorial debut for Maude Apatow that brings a tender spin to the coming-of-age rom-com." Metacritic, which uses a weighted average, assigned the film a score of 77 out of 100, based on 7 critics, indicating "generally favorable" reviews.

Gregory Ellwood of The Playlist praised the film’s humor and natural performances, particularly the chemistry between Hoffman, Feldman and Mann, while also noting that the film was longer than necessary.

Esther Zuckerman of IndieWire graded the film an A−. Richard Lawson of The Guardian awarded the film four stars out of five.

Jourdain Searles of The Hollywood Reporter gave the film a mixed review and wrote as the bottom line: "Warm and well-acted but disappointingly generic."

Pete Hammond of Deadline Hollywood writes that Apatow "proves she has the chops behind the camera" and calls it an "impressive first feature" that's about "people trying to grow up and find their place in the world." Hammond also uses the opportunity to laud Donatich in her first foray into feature film screen writing calling the writing "supremely intelligent and raucously amusing."
