= Jimmy Smits =

American actor (born 1955)

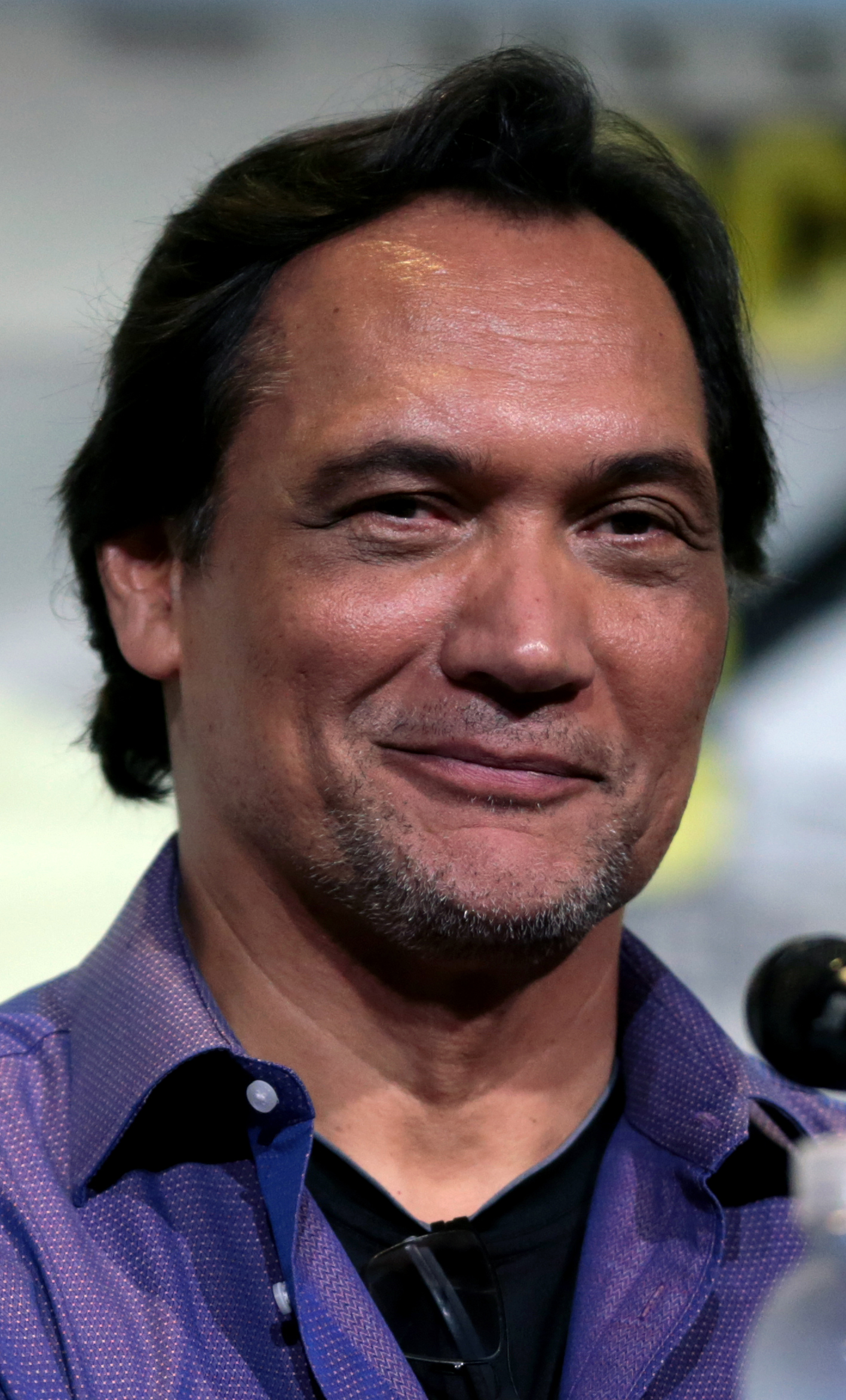
- Smits at the 2016 San Diego Comic-Con
- Born: Jimmy L. Smits; July 9, 1955 (age 71); New York City, U.S.
- Education: Brooklyn College (BA); Cornell University (MFA)
- Occupation: Actor
- Years active: 1984–present
- Known for: L.A. Law; NYPD Blue; Star Wars; Dexter; Sons of Anarchy; The West Wing
- Spouse: Barbara Smits (m. 1981; div. 1987)
- Partner: Wanda De Jesus (1986–present)
- Children: 2

Jimmy L. Smits (born July 9, 1955) is an American actor. He is best known for his roles as Attorney Victor Sifuentes on the legal drama L.A. Law, NYPD Detective Bobby Simone on the police drama NYPD Blue, Matt Santos on the political drama The West Wing and Bail Organa in the Star Wars franchise.

He has also appeared as ADA Miguel Prado in Dexter, Nero Padilla in Sons of Anarchy and Elijah Strait in Bluff City Law, and appeared in the films Switch (1991), My Family (1995), The Jane Austen Book Club (2007), and In the Heights (2021).

== Early life and education ==
Smits was born in Brooklyn, New York. Smits’ father, Cornelis Leendert Smits (1929–2015), was from Paramaribo, Suriname, and was of Dutch descent. Smits's mother, Emilina (née Pola; 1930–2015), was Puerto Rican, born in Peñuelas. He and his two sisters, Yvonne and Diana, grew up in a working-class neighborhood. When he was ten years old, he moved to Puerto Rico for a couple of years. Until then he did not speak Spanish. He described attending a Spanish-only school as "jarring" and "traumatic".

Smits was raised in a strict, devout Roman Catholic family. He identifies as Puerto Rican and frequently visits Puerto Rico.

Smits was an athlete in his youth. He graduated from Thomas Jefferson High School and later earned a bachelor's degree from Brooklyn College in 1980, where he was a first-generation college student and an MFA from Cornell University in 1982.

== Career ==
=== Film and television ===
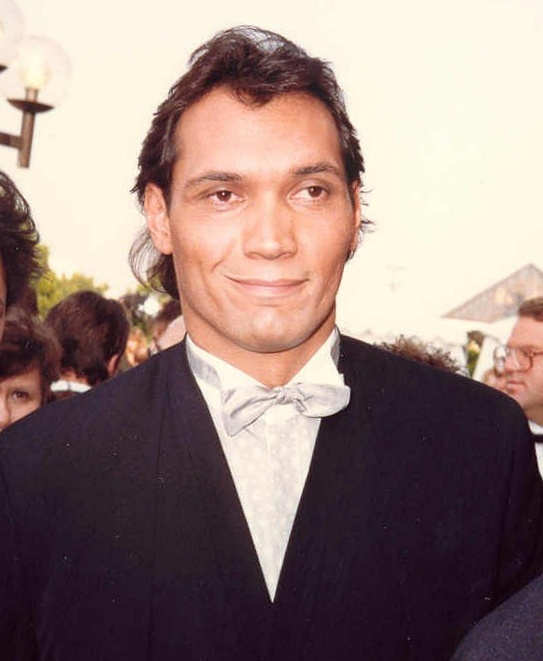
Smits at the 39th Annual Emmy Awards in 1987

One of Smits's early roles was playing Sonny Crockett's original partner on the first episode of Miami Vice in 1984. In the first five minutes of the episode he falls victim to a car bomb.

Beginning in 1986, Smits played Victor Sifuentes in the first five seasons of the NBC television Steven Bochco legal drama L.A. Law, for which he was nominated for six Primetime Emmy Award for Outstanding Supporting Actor in a Drama Series, winning in 1990.

Also in 1986, Smits made his feature film debut as drug dealer Julio Gonzalez in the comedy/action cop film Running Scared starring Billy Crystal and Gregory Hines. In 1989, Smits had a leading role in the romantic adventure Old Gringo as Jane Fonda's love interest.

Additionally, Smits played a repairman on Pee-wee's Playhouse, and he starred in the multigenerational story of a Chicano family in the film My Family (1995), alongside Edward James Olmos and Jennifer Lopez.

One of Smits's most acclaimed roles was that of Detective Bobby Simone on the ABC television program NYPD Blue, in which he starred from 1994 to 1998. He received several Emmy nominations for his performance on the series and was reunited with his former co-star Dennis Franz at the 2016 Emmy Awards presentation. He won the ALMA award twice.

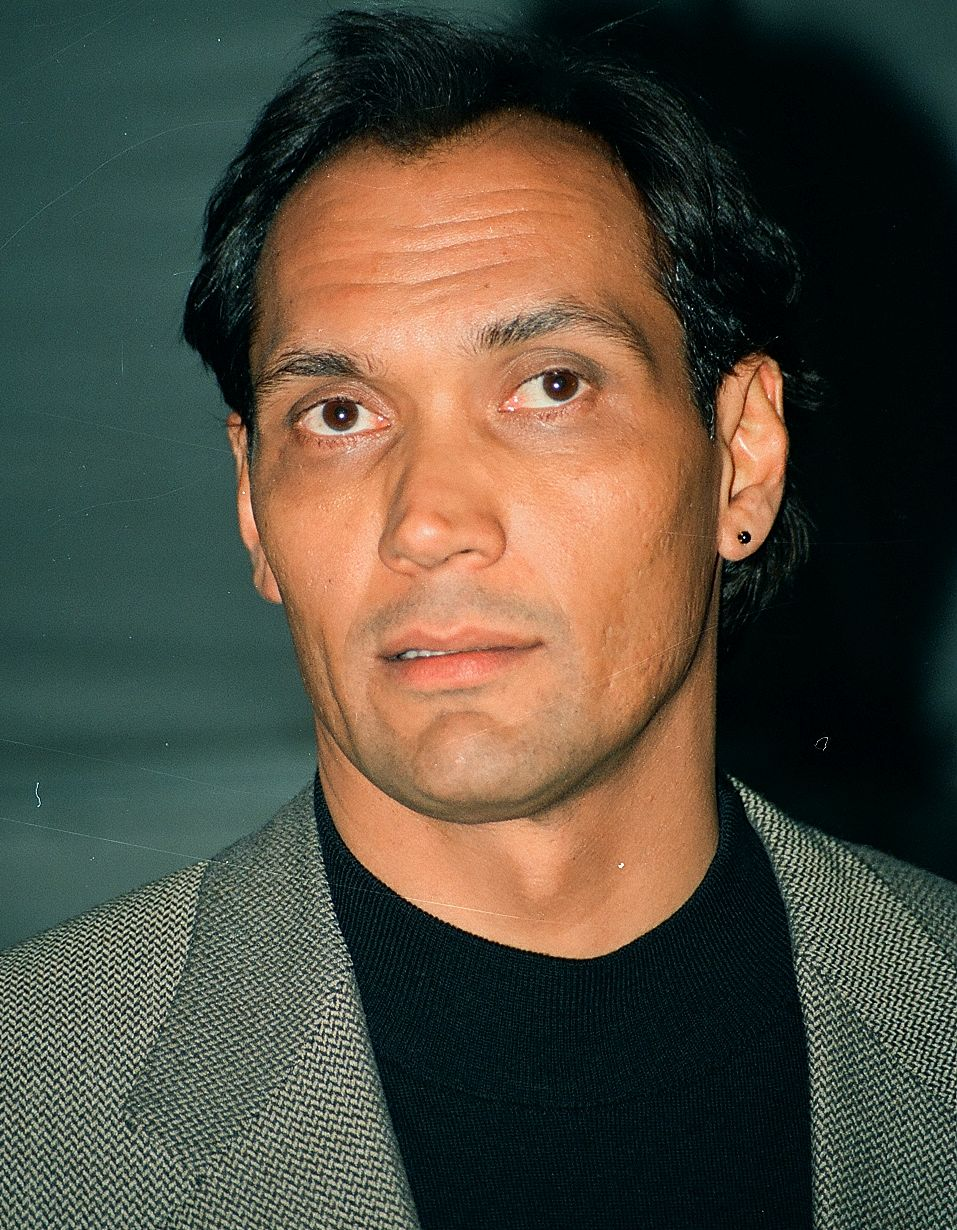
Smits in 2000

Smits was scheduled to host the 2001 Latin Grammy Awards broadcast on September 11, 2001. It was canceled due to continuous news coverage and out of respect for the victims of the terrorist attacks earlier that day. He did host a non-televised press conference to announce the winners.

Smits appeared as Senator Bail Organa of Alderaan in George Lucas's Star Wars: Episode II – Attack of the Clones (2002) and Star Wars: Episode III – Revenge of the Sith (2005), in which the character becomes Princess Leia's adoptive father. He reappeared as Bail Organa in the game Star Wars: The Force Unleashed (2008) and the spinoff Disney era movie Rogue One (2016). He later reprised the role for Obi-Wan Kenobi (2022).

Smits played the role of Congressman Matt Santos of Houston, Texas, in the final two seasons of the NBC television drama The West Wing, joining fellow L.A. Law alumnus John Spencer. His character eventually ran for and won the U.S. presidency.

In Dexter season 3, Smits played the role of Miguel Prado, an assistant district attorney who befriends the title character. Smits was nominated for an Emmy Award for Outstanding Guest Actor in a Drama Series for the role. He subsequently reprised the role in the 2025 Dexter: Resurrection premiere A Beating Heart....

Additionally, Smits portrayed the character Alex Vega in the CBS TV series Cane, which aired from September 25, 2007, to December 18, 2007, and was subsequently canceled by the network due to the 2007 Screen Writer's Guild strike.

Smits joined the Sons of Anarchy cast in season 5 as Nero Padilla, a high-level pimp who refers to himself as a "companionator". He builds a relationship with Gemma Teller Morrow (Katey Sagal) and forms an alliance and mentorship with Gemma's son, the central character Jax Teller (Charlie Hunnam).

Smits starred in The Get Down, a musical drama television series which debuted in 2016 on Netflix.

On February 25, 2019, news outlets reported that Smits was cast as Elijah Strait in NBC drama series Bluff City Law and it was picked up to series on May 6, 2019. Bluff City Law brings Smits back to TV courtrooms on a steady basis for the first time in over a quarter century since his role in L.A. Law.

In 2021, Smits played Kevin Rosario in the musical film In the Heights.

=== Theater ===
In the mid-1980s, Smits acted in numerous performances at the Hangar Theatre in Ithaca, New York, Cornell's summer repertory program. In 1982 at the Hangar his roles included Max in Cabaret, Paul in Loose Ends, and the lead in Pudd'nhead Wilson. Smits has participated in the Public Theater's New York Shakespeare Festival, playing the role of Duke Orsino in Twelfth Night in 2002 and Benedick in Much Ado about Nothing in 2004. In 2003, Smits starred in the Broadway production of the Pulitzer Prize-winning play, Anna in the Tropics, by Nilo Cruz, performed at the Royale Theatre. From November 2009 to February 2010, he appeared opposite Christine Lahti, Annie Potts, and Ken Stott in the critically lauded Broadway play God of Carnage, replacing Jeff Daniels. In December 2012 through March 2013, he appeared in Chicago in The Motherfucker with the Hat, at Steppenwolf Theatre Company.

== Personal life ==
Smits was previously married to Barbara Smits. They have two children.

He has been in a relationship with actress Wanda De Jesus since 1986. They live together in Los Angeles. In 1987, Smits pled guilty to disturbing the peace following an altercation with police at his residence where he was charged with battery and resisting arrest.

Smits helped found the National Hispanic Foundation for the Arts to advance the presence of Latinos in the media, telecommunications, and entertainment industries. He is also an advocate for diagnostic colorectal screening and has appeared in a public service commercial. In 2010, he filmed a PSA for Detroit Non-Profit Cass Community Social Services and also served as the Honorary Chair of their 6th Annual "Catch the Fireworks With Cass" event.

== Filmography ==
=== Film ===
Year	Title	Role	Notes
1986	Running Scared	Julio Gonzales	
1987	Hotshot	Stars Team Member	
1987	The Believers	Tom Lopez	
1989	Old Gringo	Gen. Tomas Arroyo	
1990	Vital Signs	Dr. David Redding	
1991	Switch	Walter Stone	
1991	Fires Within	Nestor	
1993	Gross Misconduct	Justin Thorne	
1995	My Family	Jimmy Sanchez	
1995	The Last Word	Actor (Martin)	
1996	Marshal Law	U.S. Marshal Jack Coleman	
1997	Murder in Mind	Peter Walker	
1997	Lesser Prophets	Mike	
2000	Adventures in Wild California	Narrator	
2000	The Million Dollar Hotel	Geronimo	
2000	Price of Glory	Arturo Ortega	
2000	Bless the Child	Agent John Travis	
2002	Star Wars: Episode II – Attack of the Clones	Senator Bail Organa	
2005	Star Wars: Episode III – Revenge of the Sith	Senator Bail Organa	
2007	The Jane Austen Book Club	Daniel Avila	
2009	Backyard	Mickey Santos	Also known as El Traspatio
2010	Mother and Child	Paco	
2016	Rogue One: A Star Wars Story	Senator Bail Organa	
2017	Who We Are Now	Carl	
2020	The Tax Collector	Wizard	
2021	In the Heights	Kevin Rosario	

=== Television ===
Year	Title	Role	Notes
1984	Miami Vice	Eddie Rivera	Episode: "Brother's Keeper"
1986	Rockabye	2nd Policeman	Television film
1986–92	L.A. Law	Victor Sifuentes	Main role; 105 episodes
1986	Spenser: For Hire	Hector Valdes	Episode: "In a Safe Place"
1987	The Highwayman	Bo Ziker	Television film
1987	Stamp of a Killer	Richard Braden	Television film
1988	Mickey's 60th Birthday	Victor Sifuentes	Television special
1988	Glitz	Vincent Marra	Television film
1989	Pee-wee's Playhouse	Johnny Wilson	Episode: "Conky's Breakdown"
1990	Cop Rock	Victor Sifuentes (uncredited)	Episode: "Potts Don't Fail Me Now"
1992	The Broken Cord	David Norwell	Television film
1993	The Tommyknockers	Jim 'Gard' Gardner	2 episodes
1994	The Cisco Kid	Cisco Kid	Television film
1994–98, 2004	NYPD Blue	Detective Bobby Simone	Main role; 90 episodes
1995	Solomon & Sheba	King Solomon	Television film
1995–97	Happily Ever After: Fairy Tales for Every Child	Prince Felipe, Old King Cole	Voice; 2 episodes
2004–06	The West Wing	Matt Santos	Main role; 35 episodes
2005	Lackawanna Blues	Ruben Santiago, Sr.	Television film
2007	Cane	Alex Vega	13 episodes
2008	Dexter	Miguel Prado	12 episodes
2010	Outlaw	Cyrus Garza	Main role; 8 episodes
2012–14	Sons of Anarchy	Neron 'Nero' Padilla	38 episodes
2016–17	The Get Down	Francisco "Papa Fuerte" Cruz	11 episodes
2016–17	Brooklyn Nine-Nine	Victor Santiago	2 episodes
2017	24: Legacy	John Donovan	12 episodes
2017–18	How to Get Away with Murder	Dr. Isaac Roa	13 episodes
2018	America's Untold Story	Narrator	Television film
2019	Bluff City Law	Elijah Strait	Main role; 10 episodes; Also producer
2022	Obi-Wan Kenobi	Senator Bail Organa	3 episodes
2022–23	East New York	Assistant Chief John Suarez	Main role; 21 episodes
2025	Dexter: Resurrection	Miguel Prado	Episode: "A Beating Heart..."
2027	The Walking Dead: Daryl Dixon	Captain Alejandro Perkins	

=== Video games ===
Year	Title	Voice role	Notes
2008	Star Wars: The Force Unleashed	Senator Bail Organa	
2016	Gears of War 4	Oscar Diaz	

== Awards and nominations ==
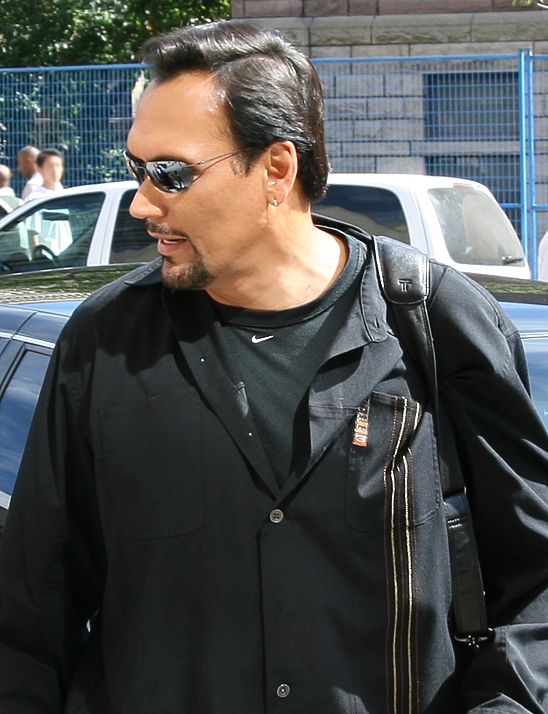
Smits at the 2007 Toronto International Film Festival

Smits has received multiple nominations and awards for his work in film and television. He is the recipient of one Golden Globe Award for his role on NYPD Blue as well as one Primetime Emmy Award for L.A. Law. Throughout his career on television, he has garnered eleven Screen Actors Guild Awards nominations, winning once in the Outstanding Performance by an Ensemble in a Drama Series in 1995 for NYPD Blue. He starred on The West Wing from 2004 to 2006 and won an ALMA Award for his role. And in 2008, guest starred on Dexter, for which he was nominated for his twelfth Primetime Emmy Award and winning a Saturn Award for Best Guest Starring Role on Television.

In 1999, Smits received the HOLA Award for Excellence from the Hispanic Organization of Latin Actors (HOLA). He also received the Ackerman Leadership Award for his work "championing bilingual and bicultural mental health and social services for Latino families." On June 4, 2021, he was awarded the 2,696th star on the Hollywood Walk of Fame.

== See also ==
- List of Puerto Ricans
