= Monster Mutt (film) =

- Theatrical poster
- Directed by: Todd Tucker
- Screenplay by: Timothy Dolan
- Story by: Todd Tucker
- Produced by: Harvey Lowry; Seth William Meier; Chris Nassif; Candice Newland
- Starring: Rhiannon Leigh Wryn; Bart Johnson; Billy Unger
- Cinematography: Yaron Levy
- Edited by: Jeff Castelluccio; Joe Pascual
- Music by: Chris Walden
- Production companies: Monster Mutt; Alternate Ending Studios; Burnside Entertainment; Green Pictures; Twisted Productions
- Distributed by: Millennium Media Services
- Release date: July 21, 2010 (Los Angeles theatrical)
- Running time: 87 minutes
- Country: United States
- Language: English

Monster Mutt is a 2010 American independent family comedy film directed by Todd Tucker and written by Timothy Dolan. It had a limited theatrical release in 2010, and a DVD release in 2011. The film stars Rhiannon Leigh Wryn, Bart Johnson, Billy Unger, and Bob Gibson, and a larger-than-life animatronic puppet of the "Monster Mutt".

== Plot ==
The family dog, Max, is kidnapped by Sirus Caldwell (Zack Ward) to be used as a product test subject. Max escapes but the new super energy drink he had been testing turns him into Monster Mutt (Bob Gibson). The Taylor family children, Ashley (Rhiannon Leigh Wryn) and Zach (Billy Unger) join up with the scientist responsible for his transformation, Dr. Victor Lloyd (Brian Stepanek), to find a cure and return Max to normal.

== Cast ==
- Rhiannon Leigh Wryn as Ashley Taylor
- Bart Johnson as Jeff Taylor
- Billy Unger as Zack Taylor
- Bob Gibson as Monster Mutt
- Zack Ward as Sirus Caldwell
- Brian Stepanek as Dr. Victor Lloyd
- Mindy Sterling as Helen
- Juliet Landau as Natalya
- Alastair Mackenzie as Monty
- John Kassir as Pet Shop Pete
- Kim Fields as Valerie Williams
- China Anderson as Nicole Williams
- Jacqueline Pinol as Tawni Martinez
- Destin Bigsby as Charlie

== Production ==
Filmed entirely within the Santa Clarita Valley, director Todd Tucker and producer Harvey Lowry created the film as their first feature film together. Known primarily for their makeup and special effects work in Hollywood, the two decided to use their skills for film production of Monster Mutt. Tucker was inspired to write the film's story by having watched Steven Spielberg’s Gremlins and E.T. the Extra-Terrestrial when he was younger. The two men kept the budget purposely low, in hopes of maximizing profit. Designed and built by academy award-winning Drac Studios, the character of Monster Mutt is a larger-than-life animatronic puppet requiring five people to control its movements.

== Soundtrack ==
Scott A. Johnson of Dread Central wrote that the film soundtrack, as composed and conducted by Chris Walden, was performed by Western Australian Philharmonic Orchestra, and "contains everything one would expect from a movie aimed at kids around ten years old." Johnson stated that the soundtrack's failure was "in its lack of through-line and 'signature' sound'", but that the tracks did what they were supposed to do, in that it "takes the film, amplifies its emotions, and does so in a way that is kid-friendly." Soundtrack Geek wrote that the soundtrack of the Monster Mutt film was released to show Walden's skill as a composer. They wrote that as the trailer "looks horrifying from an adult perspective, but more fun for the kids", the film is one that an adult might not otherwise see "unless you have children between the age of 5 and 10". In their review of the soundtrack, they wrote of the composer, "Emmy Award winner Chris Walden has been stuck in TV movie land since the early nighties, but now he has a chance to shine in a proper movie." Tracksounds wrote that the soundtrack for Monster Mutt "captures all the different genres in a kid flick – and them some", and that it was "an unexpected pleasure to listen to". They also wrote that this is "another instance of wishing we could see what the composer can do with a bigger budget or bigger screen". Sci-fi-online wrote that "Chris Walden's score for Monster Mutt is about a million times better than the low budget movie ... that it accompanies", and it is otherwise "a great score which is unfortunately not helped by being associated with a mediocre kids film".

The soundtrack contains:

1. Main Title (02:40)
2. Looking for Max (01:03)
3. School Is Out (01:31)
4. Max's Transformation (02:19)
5. Dad Brought Pizza (01:59)
6. Noise from the Backyard (03:04)
7. Ashley and Dad (01:28)
8. Surprise Visit in the Lab (02:18)
9. The Boy with Ice Cream (01:55)
10. Max in the Night (01:27)
11. Anybody Out There (01:27)
12. The Vacuum Cleaner (01:14)
13. Water (02:40)
14. The Garage Door (02:06)
15. Broom Fight (01:24)
16. Max at the Vet (02:53)
17. Max Breaks Out (02:18)
18. Max Is Hungry (03:02)
19. Break in at the Vet (03:13)
20. Fire Rescue (04:56)
21. Lab Fight (05:27)
22. Monster Puppy (03:30)
23. Looking for Max (Reprise) (01:03)

== Release ==
A trailer of the film was screened on January 10, 2010 at the Santa Clarita Valley Film Festival, immediately preceding the festival's award ceremonies, and was released theatrically in July 2010 with showings at locations such as the Laemmle's Sunset 5 theater in Los Angeles. The film was released on DVD on January 4, 2011.

== Reception ==
Scott Foy of Dread Central wrote that there is a need for family-friendly horror for kids and "that's where movies like Monster Mutt come in", despite the movie not actually containing any horror elements and being a lighthearted size-change comedy. Covering Media called the film "Beethoven meets Honey, I Blew Up the Kid", while also referring to the film as a "heartwarming comedy/adventure for the whole family". Krinein wrote that the film seemed designed for television and aimed at entertaining children on a Sunday afternoon, offering that this "unpretentious film manages to keep the attention of those willing to grant it." They also offered that considering its budget, and in making comparisons to Howard the Duck and Harry and the Hendersons, the film is quite funny. The Dove Foundation praised the film, offering that actor Brian Stepanek did "a wonderful job as the bumbling doctor, who tries to make up for his mistake", and that with its "slapstick comedy, this film may be a family favorite. It is a movie that is wholesome and enjoyable for the entire family." The Oklahoman, in calling the film "the oddest DVD to appear on release lists", noted that the cast "features a well-scrubbed cast of actors from TV shows and films that younger viewers will know well."
