= Dark Cousin =

- American Horror Story episode
- Episode no.: Season 2 Episode 7
- Directed by: Michael Rymer
- Written by: Tim Minear
- Production code: 2ATS07
- Original air date: November 28, 2012
- Running time: 41 minutes

Guest appearances
- Frances Conroy as The Angel of Death; Fredric Lehne as Frank McCann; Mark Margolis as Sam Goodman; William Mapother as Disgruntled Husband; Sean Patrick Thomas as Terry; Tongayi Chirisa as Miles; Debra Christofferson as Mrs. Stone; Lily Knight as Sister Felicity; Don Stark as Lawyer; Jennifer Holland as Sister Blackwell; Erin Allin O'Reilly as Nurse Fuller

Episode chronology
← Previous "The Origins of Monstrosity"	Next → "Unholy Night"
- American Horror Story: Asylum

"Dark Cousin" is the seventh episode of the second season of the FX anthology television series American Horror Story. The episode, written by Tim Minear and directed by Michael Rymer, aired on November 28, 2012.

In the episode, several asylum patients wish to die, one of which is Grace (Lizzie Brocheré) causing the Angel of Death (Frances Conroy) to appear, which does not sit well with Sister Mary Eunice (Lily Rabe). Before also planning to use the angel's services, Sister Jude (Jessica Lange) attempts to make peace with the parents of the girl she hit years ago. Jude is stunned to learn the girl survived the accident. After Lana (Sarah Paulson) is able to get away from Dr. Thredson (Zachary Quinto), she is injured in a freak car accident and taken back to Briarcliff. Kit (Evan Peters) escapes custody to break Grace out of the asylum, but she is accidentally shot by Frank (Fredric Lehne).

Michael Rymer was nominated for the Directors Guild of America Award for Outstanding Directing – Television Film for his work on this episode. This episode is rated TV-MA (LSV).

== Plot ==
Grace, due to an infection brought on by the botched hysterectomy performed on her, begins to die, and the Angel of Death is about to give her a "kiss of death" before she is resuscitated by one of the nuns. Dr. Arden states to Sister Mary Eunice that he never performed a hysterectomy on Grace. He later cures her of her infection.

Later, a patient named Miles attempts to commit suicide. Mary Eunice becomes distressed when she sees the name of the angel written on the wall in ancient Aramaic, in blood. Miles is bandaged and placed in solitary, where the angel appears to him and gives him the kiss of death, and he dies. Mary Eunice can see the angel, who is called Shachath. Shachath senses Mary Eunice is possessed by the Devil. Mary Eunice's true personality briefly calls out to Shachath, begging for freedom, but the Devil regains control. Shachath says the two will meet again.

Kit meets with his state lawyer, who tells him that Dr. Thredson's taped recording of Kit's confession has made his chances of avoiding execution unlikely. After Kit learns Grace is seriously ill and may die soon, Kit attacks the lawyer and escapes back to Briarcliff to find Grace.

In Thredson's basement, Thredson rapes Lana, who begins to see Shachath, but refuses to die just yet. After deciding that their 'relationship' has reached an impasse, Thredson then attempts to kill Lana, but she manages to attack him and escapes. Lana gets into the car of a man who reveals himself to be a mentally unstable misogynist whose wife has left him, and he commits suicide by shooting himself in the head, letting the car crash with her inside. Lana, seriously injured after the crash, is returned to Briarcliff by the police.

Sister Jude learns from the dying Sam Goodman that Mary Eunice was who attacked him. After Mary Eunice calls her, Jude realizes that Mary Eunice is possessed by the Devil. Jude then sees Shachath, who offers to let her die. After this, Jude decides to visit the parents of the girl she thought she had killed, but the girl is revealed to have survived.

Kit makes his way into Briarcliff and finds Grace and they begin to escape, but are seen by a nun, who is then attacked by a rasper who had followed Kit in. The creature then attacks Kit, who manages to kill it. Frank finds them and pulls his gun on Kit. Grace jumps in his way and is shot. Shachath then gives Grace the kiss of death, letting Grace die.

== Production ==
"Dark Cousin" was written by executive producer Tim Minear and directed by Michael Rymer.

In a November 2012 interview with Entertainment Weekly, series creator Ryan Murphy spoke about the inspiration for "Dark Cousin", "Well the episode is one of my favorites because I think it just has great performances and I really love what it's about. I love Franny [Frances Conroy] and she and I were presenting at the Creative Arts Emmys and I said, 'I think I have something really good for you, sort of the opposite of what you did last year.' She and Jessica [Lange] loved working together. So we came up with this character and I like that she's around in all the individual stories at that pivotal moment of are you going to fight or are you going to die." He added, "But when we were coming with the idea of it, I was meeting with hair and make up and Lou Eyrich, the costumer, and we at first came up with this idea that she was the black version of Miss Havisham. But I didn't like that. I thought let's do something unexpected. So our inspirations were very bizarre. We took sort of like 1940s, hard-boiled noir women and mixed it with a sort of Comme des Garçons meets Japanese thing. I was very proud of that look and I thought Franny was very yummy. You could see why people would want her to kiss them."

== Reception ==
"Dark Cousin" was watched by 2.27 million viewers and received an adult 18-49 rating of 1.3, an increase from the previous episode.

Rotten Tomatoes reports a 90% approval rating, based on 10 reviews. The critical consensus reads, "Forgoing the regular camp, "Dark Cousin" makes some poignant historical references while serving up a hefty dose of creep and gore." Joey DeAngelis of The Huffington Post called the episode "one of the more grounded and moving episodes", but added that it was "more of a filler episode, not really unearthing anything brand spankin' new. It was kind of a lull for me." Emily VanDerWerff of The A.V. Club stated, "It was the presence of that death angel that most intrigued me tonight. I liked how we could trace just how broken these people were by those who would break them by seeing if they could see the angel or not."
