= A Beating Heart... =

- Dexter: Resurrection episode
- Angel Batista (David Zayas) reunites with Dexter Morgan (Michael C. Hall) for the first time after more than a decade of leaving him for dead.
- Episode no.: Season 1 Episode 1
- Directed by: Marcos Siega
- Written by: Clyde Phillips; Scott Reynolds
- Cinematography by: Joe Collins
- Editing by: Perri Frank
- Original air date: July 11, 2025
- Running time: 51 minutes

Guest appearances
- John Lithgow as Arthur Mitchell (special guest star); Erik King as James Doakes (special guest star); Jimmy Smits as Miguel Prado (special guest star); David Magidoff as Teddy Reed; Marc Menchaca as Red; Bryan Lillis as Ryan Foster; Isabella Star LaBlanc; Jason Alan Carvell as Stefan Pike; McKaley Miller as Shauna; Dallas Goldtooth as Dr. Abrams; Darius Jordan Lee as Lance Thomas; Eli Sherman as Young Dexter

Episode chronology
← Previous —	Next → "Camera Shy"

"A Beating Heart..." is the series premiere of the American crime drama mystery television series Dexter: Resurrection, sequel to Dexter and Dexter: New Blood. The episode was written by series creator Clyde Phillips and executive producer Scott Reynolds, and directed by executive producer Marcos Siega. It was released on Paramount+ with Showtime on July 11, 2025, and aired on Showtime two days later.

The series is set following the events of Dexter: New Blood, and it follows Dexter Morgan, who has recovered from his near-fatal gunshot wound. After realizing that his son Harrison is now working as a hotel bellhop in New York City, he sets out to find him. During this, his old friend Angel Batista returns to talk with Dexter over unfinished business.

The series premiere received mostly positive reviews from critics, who praised the performances, tone and intrigue, with many deeming it as a promising debut for the series.

== Plot ==
After being shot by his son Harrison, (Note: As depicted in "Sins of the Father") Dexter Morgan is taken to the Seneca Nation in Iron Lake, where his life is saved but he falls into a coma. Dexter imagines conversations with Arthur Mitchell, Miguel Prado, Harry Morgan, and James Doakes. When he awakens after ten weeks, he is told that he survived due to the cold temperature slowing his bleeding and that Harrison has not been seen in weeks.

Harrison is in New York City working as a bellhop at The Empire Hotel. He has made friends with his colleagues, and apparently lives at the hotel, staying nights in various rooms. He sees two guests together, Shauna and Ryan Foster, who he knows did not arrive together. She is without her faculties, and he is referring to her as his wife. Noticing her seemingly about to faint, Harrison questions him, but helps bring Shauna to Ryan's room. Hearing her say "no" through the door, Harrison enters and, in a struggle, murders Ryan Foster.

After taking the still unaware Shauna to her room, Harrison thoroughly cleans the crime scene and takes Ryan's body to the kitchen, where he cuts it into nine pieces, placing the severed body parts into trash bags, as Dexter taught him, (Note: As depicted in "The Family Business") although missing some blood spatter on the ceiling. The bags containing the remains get loaded into a garbage truck. The next morning, one of the bags breaks, revealing a piece of the dismembered corpse. Detectives Melvin Oliva and Claudette Wallace arrive at the dump and locate the rest of the body, identifying both the hotel and the room. At the hotel, they take notice of Harrison nervously lurking nearby.

At the clinic, Dexter is visited by Teddy Reed and believes he is about to be arrested. However, Teddy reveals that he is now the acting Sheriff, Angela and Audrey left Iron Lake, and Dexter has been cleared of any crimes. Teddy asks Dexter if he would like to press charges against Angela, but he refuses. An envelope from her tells Dexter that "[they]'re even".

Dexter is visited by Angel Batista, who has legally 'resurrected' Dexter Morgan, supposedly to be able to prosecute him. He questions him about faking his death, remaining hidden, Angela's accusation that he is the Bay Harbor Butcher, her subsequent recanting of the accusation, and María LaGuerta's confidence in the same. A suspicious Dexter subtly denies any accusations.

The next morning, Dexter hears about the discovered body parts, suspecting Harrison. Considering that he needs to silently protect his son, Dexter decides to set off for New York City. He orchestrates an escape to avoid Batista, who is back to interrogate him again, steals a car, drives to New York City, and spots Harrison at the entrance of the hotel.

A woman, Charley (Uma Thurman), breaks into a man's home, eventually discovering blood-marked IDs of multiple people (trophies) and leaving a large amount of cash. She leaves, calling someone to announce an invitation has been delivered.

== Production ==
=== Development ===
The episode was written by series creator Clyde Phillips and executive producer Scott Reynolds, and directed by executive producer Marcos Siega.

=== Writing ===
Phillips was interested in exploring Harrison's personality after the events of New Blood, "This was his way of dealing with something that's wrong and dangerous. He knows one of the rules is that you kill in order to help other people. Maybe this was an overreaction on his part, maybe it was the right thing to do. The audience can determine that, and Harrison and Dexter will determine that. But it raises a question: Is this in his DNA?" Jack Alcott added, "I think that that is a real gift that Harrison gets from Dexter. Being a really impulsive, reactive person can lead itself to all sorts of nasty situations and it is the discipline and the meticulousness that he received from his father that really gets him out of that situation in the hotel."

Michael C. Hall said that the conversation between Dexter and Angel was one of his favorite scenes to film, explaining "It was just so rich and complicated. There is so much water under the bridge, and this cat-and-mouse dynamics. But it was also just so bittersweet, these guys who used to have this simple connection, everything’s just fraught with complication and suspicion now." David Zayas also offered another perspective, "This is a different Angel, with all the information he has now, particularly Dexter just being alive. It's a new case he has to deal with outside of his environment, in a new place, in New York, where he has no authority as a police officer. He's having to deal with the cold coming from Miami. There's so many little issues for him to navigate, while he's trying to get some justice for all of what he's missed over those many years."

=== Casting ===
In March 2025, John Lithgow and Jimmy Smits were confirmed to return as guest stars. In June 2025, Erik King confirmed he would also return.

Phillips explained the decision, "It is really Dexter's subconscious saying, “I've got to get back to my son.” This is America's favorite serial killer show, but it's also a father-and-son show. And it's Dexter's mission to get back and try to undo the trauma of having Harrison, his own son, shoot him. Dexter wants to save that relationship." Hall was excited in getting them back for guest spots, "It was awesome. It was such a perfect way to re-engage with the mythology of the character. For me as an actor, for the character, for the audience, to grow out of that soil was the best way to start."

== Reception ==
"A Beating Heart..." received mostly positive reviews from critics. Louis Peitzman of Vulture gave the episode a 4 star rating out of 5 and wrote, "If it helps ease your confusion, consider that Resurrection is essentially a rebranded tenth season of the original show. While technically a new series, it starts with a “previously on” that sums up the entirety of New Blood, and the first episode is loaded with references to Dexter proper, including several familiar faces. With OG showrunner Clyde Phillips back in the driver's seat, we're in safe hands."

Shawn Van Horn of Collider wrote, "The episode ends with a mysterious woman breaking into an apartment. [...] Dexter is resurrected, but it looks like his life, along with others, is about to take an interesting new direction." Matthew Wilkinson of Game Rant wrote, "it all still feels familiar in a positive way, and Dexter: Resurrection has started well, with the serial killer world making an emphatic return." Mads Misasi of Telltale TV wrote, "While Dexter: Resurrection Season 1 Episode 1, “A Beating Heart...” focuses mostly on Dexter's coma dreams, there is some depth added with the Harrison bits."

Greg MacArthur of Screen Rant wrote, "The first two episodes of Dexter: Resurrection show incredible promise for the Dexter sequel series, blending the show's vintage nostalgia with fresh new faces and storylines. While the location switch to New York City may have initially seemed risky, watching Dexter operate in the Big Apple is just as great as Miami – and far better than frigid Iron Lake." Carissa Pavlica of TV Fanatic gave the episode a 3.75 star rating out of 5 and wrote, "It's messy, psychological, and leans heavily into its legacy. But for a series that’s literally bringing its protagonist back from the dead, Dexter: Resurrection hits the ground running with just the right mix of nostalgia, narrative propulsion, and an infuriating knack for letting its antihero live to kill another day."
