= The Origins of Monstrosity =

- American Horror Story episode
- Episode no.: Season 2 Episode 6
- Directed by: David Semel
- Written by: Ryan Murphy
- Production code: 2ATS06
- Original air date: November 21, 2012
- Running time: 41 minutes

Guest appearances
- Chloë Sevigny as Shelley; Jenna Dewan-Tatum as Teresa Morrison; Mark Consuelos as Spivey; Mark Margolis as Sam Goodman; Amy Farrington as Mrs. Reynolds; Nikki Hahn as Jenny Reynolds; Bob Bancroft as Harry Kirkland; Eugene Byrd as Police Officer; David Gianopoulos as Detective John Greyson; Kirk Bovill as Phil; Kasey Mahaffy as Father James; Dylan McDermott as Johnny Morgan (voice only)

Episode chronology
← Previous "I Am Anne Frank"	Next → "Dark Cousin"
- American Horror Story: Asylum

"The Origins of Monstrosity" is the sixth episode of the second season of the FX anthology television series American Horror Story. The episode, written by series co-creator Ryan Murphy and directed by David Semel, aired on November 21, 2012. This episode is rated TV-MA (LSV).

In the episode, a 911 call directs the police to the modern-day asylum. At the past asylum, little Jenny Reynolds (Nikki Hahn) becomes a new patient after her mother (Amy Farrington) believes she has killed someone. Sister Jude (Jessica Lange) finally gets evidence of Dr. Arden's (James Cromwell) horrific past, but puts someone's life and her career at stake as Arden, Monsignor Howard (Joseph Fiennes), and Sister Mary Eunice (Lily Rabe) indirectly form an evil union. Lana (Sarah Paulson) remains a hostage of Dr. Thredson (Zachary Quinto), who tells her what set him on his dark path. Chloë Sevigny guest stars as Shelley.

== Plot ==
Flashing forward to 2012, the police arrive at Briarcliff, where by phone, present day Bloody Face explains he only killed the three people who impersonated Bloody Face. The police find Leo's body and missing severed arm. After learning Leo was on his honeymoon, they search for Teresa, whom Bloody Face is holding captive.

A mother drops her daughter Jenny off at the asylum, believing the girl has killed another child. Sister Mary Eunice sympathizes with her, reflecting on a previous humiliation. Mary Eunice supports Jenny's dark side. Later, Jenny kills her entire family and, when asked by the police who has killed them, she tells the same lie to the police as when she killed her friend.

Dr. Thredson tells his captive Lana about his past; he is an orphan with abandonment issues, who relates the first corpse he skinned, a woman who resembled his birth mother, but decided to only skin living women afterwards due to the odor of formaldehyde. He treats Lana as a maternal figure, something Lana goes along with. While Thredson takes a phone call from Kit, who enrages him by calling him a liar, Lana attempts to escape. Thredson finds out and prepares to kill her, but Lana stops him by acting as a mother figure.

Monsignor Howard is called to a hospital about a disfigured patient, Shelley. Howard realizes that Arden disfigured her, and chokes her to death with rosary beads to cover it up. He then confronts Arden about his "research". Arden tells Howard that his experiments will create "superhumans" who will survive almost anything. He blackmails the monsignor to keep his work a secret and to fire the suspicious Sister Jude.

Sam Goodman calls Jude to tell her he has found evidence that Arden is, in fact, Nazi war criminal Hans Grüper. However, he needs Arden's fingerprint to prove it, which she manages to get. Mary Eunice goes to Sam's apartment and stabs him in the neck with broken glass. Jude finds him dying, and he reveals a nun stabbed him. Mary Eunice shows Sam's evidence to Arden, using it to blackmail him.

== Reception ==
"The Origins of Monstrosity" was watched by 1.89 million viewers and received an adult 18-49 rating of 0.9, marking the series' lowest numbers, until "She Gets Revenge" from the fifth season.

Rotten Tomatoes reports a 91% approval rating, based on 11 reviews. The critical consensus reads, ""The Origins of Monstrosity" is not as engrossing as its predecessor, yet several plot machinations serve to fill in the gaps." Joey DeAngelis of The Huffington Post thought the episode was of high quality, calling it "my favorite episode of the season (or maybe even the series)." He then praised many aspects of the episode, including the cast, stating, "Since episode one, the show has been built on these strong female characters. It doesn't matter whether they're battling for good or evil. Lily Rabe, Jessica Lange, and Sarah Paulson are in a whole league of their own." Geoff Berkshire of Zap2it called the episode "overly talky...and not quite as compelling as the rest of the season so far." Emily VanDerWerff of The A.V. Club stated, "What's disappointing is that "The Origins of Monstrosity" is a dull and listless episode. It's easily the most boring episode this season, and it spends lots of time offering origin stories for characters who either already had them or didn't particularly need them."
