= Trinkets (TV series) =

American television series

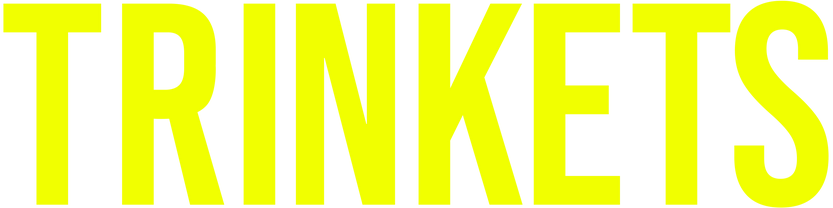
- Genre: Teen drama
- Created by: Amy Andelson; Emily Meyer; Kirsten "Kiwi" Smith
- Based on: Trinkets by Kirsten "Kiwi" Smith
- Starring: Brianna Hildebrand; Kiana Madeira; Quintessa Swindell; Brandon Butler; Odiseas Georgiadis; Larry Sullivan; Dana Green; Linden Ashby; October Moore
- Composer: Keegan DeWitt
- Original language: English
- No. of seasons: 2
- No. of episodes: 20

Production
- Executive producers: Amy Andelson; Emily Meyer; Linda Gase; Kirsten "Kiwi" Smith; Shelley Zimmerman; Rebecca Glashow; Brin Lukens; Sarah Goldfinger
- Producers: Don Dunn; Scott Levine; Melanie Kirk; Emma Fletcher; Kevin Sullivan
- Cinematography: Jason Oldak; Zach Salsman; Pedro Gomez Millan
- Editors: Philip Fowler; Ben Callahan; Matt Diezel; Scott Ashby; Martin Wilson; Karolina Tuovinen; Gregg Featherman; Erin Nicole Wyatt
- Camera setup: Single-camera
- Running time: 21–30 minutes
- Production companies: AwesomenessTV; Two Blocks Apart Productions

Original release
- Network: Netflix
- Release: June 14, 2019 – August 25, 2020

Trinkets is an American teen drama television series, based on the 2013 novel of the same name by Kirsten Smith. The series was created by Smith, Amy Andelson, and Emily Meyer. It was released on Netflix on June 14, 2019. In July 2019, the series was renewed for a second and final season which was released on August 25, 2020.

== Plot ==
Elodie Davis, Moe Truax, and Tabitha Foster become friends after finding each other at a Shoplifters Anonymous meeting. The characters have different personalities and personas in school, keeping their friendship a secret: Elodie is an introvert; Moe favors punk style; while Tabitha comes from a wealthy family. They form a deep bond after finding out that they all have a shoplifting habit. Each also finds in the others strength as they navigate their own problems such as family and school issues.

== Cast and characters ==
=== Main ===
- Brianna Hildebrand as Elodie Davis, a socially awkward teenage kleptomaniac who moves from Albuquerque, New Mexico, to Portland, Oregon, to live with her father, his new wife, and stepbrother after the death of her mother. She has trouble adjusting to her new life with her father but forms a close bond with Moe and Tabitha for support.
- Kiana Madeira as Moe Truax, an academically talented teenager from a financially challenged family who also attends SA meetings. She has commitment and trust issues due to an absent father with a criminal record but is fiercely loyal to her mother and manages to form a close bond with Elodie and Tabitha for support. She has a secret, romantic relationship with Noah Simos.
- Quintessa Swindell as Tabitha Foster, a fellow kleptomaniac who comes from a wealthy family. She struggles with who she is supposed to be to please everyone and who she wants to be to make herself happy, but the close bond she has with Moe and Elodie helps her come to terms.
- Brandon Butler as Brady Finch, Tabitha's abusive on-again, off-again boyfriend who uses her father's connection to Stanford to help himself and eventually blackmails Tabitha into a relationship. He is on the soccer team with Noah.
- Odiseas Georgiadis as Noah Simos, Moe's love interest whose relationship with Moe is secret. He was supportive of Moe and her academic achievements and wishes to be public with their relationship. He is on the soccer team with Brady and unaware of Brady's abusiveness towards Tabitha.
- Larry Sullivan as Doug Davis, Elodie's father who pushes her to attend SA meetings.
- Dana Green as Jenna, Elodie's stepmother.
- Linden Ashby as Whit Foster (season 2; recurring season 1), Tabitha's father who is having an affair and tries to help Brady in his Stanford application.
- October Moore as Vicky Truax (season 2; recurring season 1), Moe's mother.

=== Recurring ===
- Henry Zaga as Luca Novak, Tabitha's love interest and fellow SA attender. He previously was involved with Sabine, but Luca broke it off because it wasn't healthy.
- Parker Hall as Spencer, Jenna's son and Elodie's younger stepbrother
- Jessica Lynn Skinner as Kayla Landis, Tabitha's friend.
- Haley Tju as Rachelle Cohen-Strauss
- Katrina Cunningham as Sabine, Elodie's love interest and a rising singer. She was previously involved with Luca, but Luca broke it off because Sabine was all consuming.
- Joy Bryant as Lori Foster, Tabitha's mother who is obsessed with her online presence and how she and her family are presented online.
- Jacob Skidmore as AJ
- Andrew Jacobs as Ben Truax (season 2), Moe's older brother and Tabitha's love interest
- Chloë Levine as Jillian (season 2), Elodie's new love interest
- Austin Crute as Marquise (season 2)
- Nik Dodani as Chase (season 2)
- Bryce Earheart as Druggie Dave (season 1)

=== Guest stars ===
- Larisa Oleynik as Shawn, a fellow kleptomaniac in the SA meetings
- Andrew Keegan as Danny Truax, Moe's deadbeat father
- Emmett Pearson-Brown as Jake Dunford, guidance counselor
- Michael Cojocaru as Guy with Keg

== Production ==
=== Development ===
On October 15, 2018, Netflix announced that it had given the production a series order. It also announced that Linda Gase would serve as showrunner, writers would include Amy Andelson, Emily Meyer, and Kirsten “Kiwi” Smith and that Sara St. Onge would direct the first two episodes of the series. On July 29, 2019, the series was renewed for a second and final season.

=== Casting ===
Alongside the initial series order announcement, it was announced that Brianna Hildebrand, Kiana Madeira, Quintessa Swindell, Larry Sullivan, Brandon Butler, Odiseas Georgiadis, Henry Zaga, October Moore, and Larisa Oleynik would star in the series. On October 22, 2019, it was reported that Austin Crute, Nik Dodani, Andrew Jacobs, Chloë Levine were cast in recurring roles for the second season.

== Episodes ==
=== Series overview ===
Season	Episodes	Originally released
1	10	June 14, 2019
2	10	August 25, 2020

=== Season 1 (2019) ===
No. overall	No. in season	Title	Directed by	Written by	Original release date
1	1	"Mirror Faces"	Sara St. Onge	Teleplay by : Amy Andelson & Emily Meyer	June 14, 2019
2	2	"Paper Tiger"	Sara St. Onge	Linda Gase	June 14, 2019
3	3	"P*ssy Palace"	Clare Kilner	Jess Meyer	June 14, 2019
4	4	"Happy F**king Birthday"	Clare Kilner	Amy Andelson & Emily Meyer	June 14, 2019
5	5	"Big Mistake"	Sherwin Shilati	Matt Shire	June 14, 2019
6	6	"Rearview Mirror"	Sherwin Shilati	Stephanie Coggins	June 14, 2019
7	7	"Truth Serum"	Hannah Macpherson	Jess Meyer & Kirsten "Kiwi" Smith	June 14, 2019
8	8	"Monday I'm in Love"	Hannah Macpherson	Amy Andelson & Emily Meyer	June 14, 2019
9	9	"Night Market"	Sara St. Onge	Linda Gase	June 14, 2019
10	10	"The Great Escape"	Sara St. Onge	Amy Andelson & Emily Meyer & Kirsten "Kiwi" Smith	June 14, 2019

=== Season 2 (2020) ===
No. overall	No. in season	Title	Directed by	Written by	Original release date
11	1	"Supernova"	John Fortenberry	Amy Andelson & Emily Meyer & Kirsten "Kiwi" Smith	August 25, 2020
12	2	"Last Night of Freedom"	John Fortenberry	Sarah Goldfinger	August 25, 2020
13	3	"Disconnected"	Sherwin Shilati	Alex Blagg	August 25, 2020
14	4	"Ghouls Just Wanna Have Fun"	Sherwin Shilati	Emily Ryan Lerner	August 25, 2020
15	5	"Works In Progress"	Ayoka Chenzira	Baindu Saidu & Courtney Perdue	August 25, 2020
16	6	"Ocean's 11th Grade"	Ayoka Chenzira	Emma Fletcher	August 25, 2020
17	7	"Same Time Last Year"	Megan Griffiths	Crystal Ferreiro	August 25, 2020
18	8	"Black Friday"	Megan Griffiths	Emily Ryan Lerner & Kirsten "Kiwi" Smith	August 25, 2020
19	9	"Aren't You Gonna Say Something"	Sara St. Onge	Alex Blagg	August 25, 2020
20	10	"We Belong"	Sara St. Onge	Amy Andelson & Emily Meyer	August 25, 2020

== Release ==
On May 30, 2019, the official trailer was released. The first season was released on Netflix on June 14, 2019. On August 13, 2020, the trailer for the second season was released. The second season was released on August 25, 2020.

== Reception ==
On review aggregator Rotten Tomatoes, the first season has an approval rating of 56% with an average rating of 8/10, based on 9 reviews.
