= Lois Smith (publicist) =

US entertainment publicist (1928–2012)

- Born: Lois Eileen Wollenweber; March 1, 1928; Brooklyn, New York
- Died: October 7, 2012 (aged 84)
- Citizenship: American
- Education: BA in Communications
- Alma mater: University of Southern California
- Occupation: Publicist
- Years active: 1950s to 2001
- Organization: PMK
- Spouse: Eugene Smith
- Children: Brooke Smith
- Awards: Publicist Guild Lifetime Achievement Award; Matrix Award for Women in Communications

Lois Smith (March 1, 1928 – October 7, 2012) was an American entertainment publicist.

== Biography ==
A "trailblazer who brought big changes to a business dominated by men," she represented Marilyn Monroe, Martin Scorsese, Robert Redford, Meryl Streep, Whitney Houston, Warren Beatty, and Liza Minnelli, among others. Smith is noted for her impact on the practice of entertainment PR; rather than seeking to generate as much media coverage as possible for her clients, Smith limited the media's access.

She pursued a career as a journalist, but was warned that women were seldom offered reporting assignments, and turned down a job as a researcher at Time. She instead worked in public relations, initially representing industrial and fashion firms, and then the entertainment industry. Her first film client was Shelley Winters.

Smith co-founded PickWick Public Relations in 1969, which became PMK following a series of mergers. Run with partners Leslee Dart and Pat Kingsley into the 1990s, it became one of the most powerful PR firms in the entertainment industry. In a 2010 interview following her retirement, she said: "I'm so glad I'm not doing publicity now. Between celebrity magazines and websites, there's so much out there to be filled up, so much information that has to be put out there simply because those publications exist... People are desperate to fill the space they've got; they'll print anything, go with anything, pursue rumours, and even create them. It's not what I call publicity."

== Death ==
Smith died of a brain hemorrhage in 2012, the result of a fall. She was survived by her daughter, Brooke Smith, an actress.
