= Hysteria! =

2024 American TV series

- Promotional poster
- Genre: Comedy horror; Thriller
- Created by: Matthew Scott Kane
- Showrunners: Matthew Scott Kane; David A. Goodman
- Starring: Emjay Anthony; Chiara Aurelia; Kezii Curtis; Nikki Hahn; Anna Camp; Julie Bowen; Bruce Campbell
- Country of origin: United States
- Original language: English
- No. of seasons: 1
- No. of episodes: 8

Production
- Executive producers: Jordan Vogt-Roberts; Chris Bender; Jake Weiner; Jonathan Goldstein; John Francis Daley; David A. Goodman; Matthew Scott Kane
- Producer: Joseph Zolfo
- Running time: 47–60 min
- Production companies: Good Fear Content; GoldDay; Drive–Thru Productions; Cat Dead, Details Later, Inc.; Universal Content Productions

Original release
- Network: Peacock
- Release: October 18, 2024

Hysteria! is an American comedy horror thriller television series created by Matthew Scott Kane for Peacock. The series premiered on October 18, 2024. In February 2025, Peacock canceled the series after one season.

== Premise ==
In 1989, during the Satanic panic, a beloved varsity quarterback's disappearance causes whispers of occult activity and Satanic influence throughout the Detroit suburb of Happy Hollow, Michigan. Dylan, Jordy, and Spud, a trio of outcasts in a struggling heavy metal band called Dethkrunch, decide to capitalize on the town's sudden interest in the occult by rebranding themselves as a Satanic metal band. This leads to them becoming the targets of the town's witch hunt, especially when a bizarre series of murders, kidnappings, and reported supernatural activity begins happening.

== Cast and characters ==
=== Main ===
- Emjay Anthony as Dylan Campbell
- Chiara Aurelia as Jordan "Jordy" Stanwyck
- Kezii Curtis as Spud
- Nikki Hahn as Faith Whitehead
- Anna Camp as Tracy Whitehead
  - Anna Lore portrays young Tracy
- Julie Bowen as Linda Campbell
- Bruce Campbell as Chief Ben Dandridge

=== Supporting ===
- Jessica Treska as Judith Sanders
- Nolan North as Gene Campbell
- Elijah Richardson as Cliff Nelson
- Jessica Luza as Cassie Dandridge
- Jennie Page as Abigail Perkins
- Brandon Butler as Ryan Hudson
- Drew Waters as Rex Hudson
- Brittany Wilkerson as Aubrey Hudson
- Aline O'Neill as Tonya
- Seydou Maiga as Fred
- Eric Tiede as Bob Hartman
- Craig Cackowski as Jerry Nolan
- Garret Dillahunt as Beaumont Hicks / The Reverend
- Jamie Flanagan as Father Mathis
- Ray Stoney as Coach Mark Nelson
- Milly Shapiro as Ingrid
- Kevin Saunders as Gilbert
- Allison Scagliotti as Officer Olsen

== Episodes ==
No.	Title	Directed by	Written by	Original release date
1	"Hysteria"	Jordan Vogt-Roberts	Matthew Scott Kane	October 18, 2024
2	"Die Young"	Wendey Stanzler	Jamie Flanagan	October 18, 2024
3	"Can I Play with Madness"	Alonso Alvarez-Barreda	Maisie Culver	October 18, 2024
4	"Dance Macabre"	Shana Stein	Hakim Hill	October 18, 2024
5	"Mother"	Millicent Shelton	Pamela Garcia Rooney	October 18, 2024
6	"Speaking in Tongues"	Eduardo Sanchez	Dani Parker	October 18, 2024
7	"It's Late"	Wendey Stanzler	David A. Goodman	October 18, 2024
8	"Heaven's on Fire"	Jordan Vogt-Roberts	Matthew Scott Kane	October 18, 2024

== Production ==
=== Development ===
In August 2022, it was announced Peacock had given a straight-to-series order to Hysteria!, a dramatic thriller set during the Satanic panic of the 1980s from writer Matthew Scott Kane. Jonathan Goldstein and John Francis Daley served as directors and executive producers for the series. Jordan Vogt-Roberts directed the premiere episode while David A. Goodman served as the showrunner, writer, and executive producer.

On February 4, 2025, Peacock canceled the series after one season.

=== Casting ===
In April 2023, it was announced Julie Bowen had been cast as the lead, Linda Campbell, the mother of a teenage outcast. Later that month, Emjay Anthony, Chiara Aurelia, Kezii Curtis, Nikki Hahn and Anna Camp had been added to the cast. In that same month, it was also reported that Bruce Campbell had joined the cast as Chief Dandridge. In February 2024, it was reported that Nolan North, Garret Dillahunt, Elijah Richardson, Milly Shapiro, Allison Scagliotti, and Jessica Treska had joined the cast as Gene, The Reverend, Cliff, Ingrid, Officer Olsen, and Judith, respectively.

== Release ==
The series premiered on October 18, 2024, on Peacock, and consists of eight episodes. The first episode also aired on Syfy and USA Network the same day, with subsequent episodes continuing to air on USA Network each week.

== Reception ==
=== Critical response ===
The review aggregator website Rotten Tomatoes reported an 91% approval rating with an average rating of 7.0/10, based on 23 critic reviews. The website's consensus reads: "Freaky in both scares and style, Hysteria! will be a raucous good time for viewers who like their horror programming to have a sense of humor." Metacritic, which uses a weighted average, assigned a score of 62 out of 100 based on 7 critics, indicating "generally favorable reviews".
