= Brooke Smith (actress) =

American actress (born 1967)

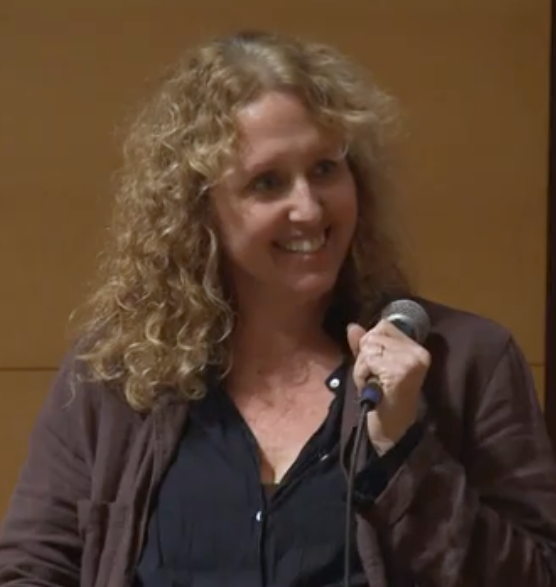
- In a discussion at the San Francisco Public Library in 2023
- Born: May 22, 1967 (age 59); New York City, U.S.
- Occupations: Actress, photographer, author
- Years active: 1988–present
- Spouse: Steve Lubensky (m. 1999)
- Children: 2
- Mother: Lois Smith

Brooke Smith (born May 22, 1967) is an American actress, photographer and author, best known for her roles as Dr. Erica Hahn on the ABC medical drama series Grey's Anatomy, as Sheriff Jane Greene on the A&E horror series Bates Motel, and as Catherine Martin in the 1991 film The Silence of the Lambs, along with roles in several movies and guest starring and recurring appearances in many television shows including Big Sky and Them.

== Early life ==
Smith was born in New York City. Her father, Eugene "Gene" Smith, worked as a publisher, and her mother, Lois Smith, worked as an entertainment publicist. In the 1980s, Smith grew up in Rockland County, in the greater New York metropolitan area, and was a part of the hardcore punk scene in Manhattan's Lower East Side.

== Career ==
Smith has appeared in numerous films, including The Moderns (1988), The Silence of the Lambs (1991), The Night We Never Met (1993), Mr. Wonderful (1993), Vanya on 42nd Street (1994), Last Summer in the Hamptons (1995), Trees Lounge (1996), Kansas City (1996), The Broken Giant (1997), Random Hearts (1999), Series 7: The Contenders (2001), Bad Company (2002), Melinda and Melinda (2004), Iron Jawed Angels (2004), Shooting Vegetarians (2005), In Her Shoes (2005), The Namesake (2006), and Interstellar (2014).

She appeared as a guest star on the sixth season of Crossing Jordan as Dr. Kate Switzer, as one of Claire Fisher's art teachers on Six Feet Under, and on Weeds as the ex-wife of Peter Scottson, the late husband of main character Nancy Botwin.

Smith originated the role of Andrea in the pilot of the ABC drama series Dirty Sexy Money, but was replaced by Sheryl Lee after becoming a series regular on Grey's Anatomy. On November 3, 2008, Smith told Entertainment Weekly that her character was being written out of Grey's Anatomy, stating that she was "really, really shocked," and suggested that network executives' discomfort with her character's lesbian relationship might be the reason for her ousting. However, Shonda Rhimes, the show's creator, said that Smith was dismissed from the series because the writers did not find that the "magic and chemistry" that Smith's character had with Sara Ramirez's character, Callie Torres, would sustain in the long run.

Smith has also had roles on Homicide: Life on the Street, Law & Order: Special Victims Unit, Law & Order: Criminal Intent, Law & Order, Criminal Minds, The Good Doctor and The Hunger. In 2012, Smith also appeared in the American Horror Story: Asylum episode "The Coat Hanger". In 2015, she appeared as Frances Simpson on the Showtime drama series Ray Donovan.

In 2016, Smith appeared in the recurring role of Sheriff Jane Greene in the fifth and final season of A&E's Bates Motel, a prequel series to director Alfred Hitchcock's 1960 horror classic Psycho.

In 2019, Smith portrayed Dara, a counselor assigned to a young rape victim, in Episode 7 of Unbelievable. It was released on September 13 on Netflix.

In 2020, she began a recurring role on the ABC series Big Sky.

In 2022, she released a photography book based on pictures she took of her friends in the Manhattan hardcore punk scene.

== Advocacy ==
On August 27, 2008, Smith spoke at an "Open the Debates" rally in Denver, Colorado (during the 2008 Democratic National Convention in that city), opposing the Commission on Presidential Debates exclusion of third party candidates from the nationally televised presidential debates, and in support of independent presidential candidate Ralph Nader.

== Personal life ==
Smith married Russian cinematographer Steve Lubensky on January 6, 1999. Their daughter, Fanny Grace Lubensky, was born on March 12, 2003. In May 2008, the couple adopted a baby girl, Lucy Dinknesh Lubensky, from Ethiopia. The family lives in New York's Upper West Side, and in Beachwood Canyon, Los Angeles. She was once roommates with singer Jeff Buckley.

== Filmography ==
=== Film ===
Year	Title	Role	Notes
1988	The Moderns	Abigail	
1989	See You in the Morning	Additional Voice	
1991	The Silence of the Lambs	Catherine Martin	
1993	The Night We Never Met	Catha	
1993	The Pickle	1st A.D.	
1993	Mr. Wonderful	Jan	
1994	Vanya on 42nd Street	Sonya	3rd Place — Boston Society of Film Critics Award for Best Actress; Nominated — Independent Spirit Award for Best Supporting Female; 3rd Place — National Society of Film Critics Award for Best Supporting Actress
1995	Last Summer in the Hamptons	Lois Garfield	
1996	Trees Lounge	Tina	
1996	Kansas City	Babe Flynn	
1997	The Broken Giant	Rosemary Smith	
1998	Remembering Sex	Jennifer Sharp	
1999	Random Hearts	Sarah	
2000	Eventual Wife	Susan	
2001	Series 7: The Contenders	Dawn Lagarto	
2001	The Man Who Wasn't There	Sobbing Prisoner	
2002	For Earth Below	Dede	
2002	Bad Company	CIA Agent Swanson	
2004	Melinda and Melinda	Cassie	
2004	Iron Jawed Angels	Mabel Vernon	
2005	Shooting Vegetarians	The Chicken Man	
2005	In Her Shoes	Amy	
2006	The Namesake	Sally	
2010	A Little Help	Kathy Helms	
2010	Fair Game	Diana	
2010	The Aspern Papers	Tita Bordereau	
2013	Labor Day	Evelyn	
2014	Interstellar	Nurse	
2015	Road Hard	Carol	
2015	Day Out of Days	Annabel	
2016	The Call of Charlie	Diane	Short film
2016	Broken Links	Diane	
2017	To the Bone	Olive	
2017	The Angry River	Katherine Alsea	Short film
2018	Dude	Lorraine	
2018	Blood Clots	Diane	
2019	Bombshell	Irena Brigante	

=== Television ===
Year	Title	Role	Notes
1988	The Equalizer	Risa	Episode: "A Dance on the Dark Side" (S3.E12)
1996	Law & Order	Margot Bell	Episode: "Savior" (S6.E16)
1997	The Larry Sanders Show	Tonya Bailey	Episode: "Make a Wish"
1998	Remembering Sex	Jennifer Sharp	TV film
1998–1999	The Hunger	Lee Cooper	2 episodes
1999	Homicide: Life on the Street	Josephine Pitt	Episode: "Truth Will Out"
2001	Big Apple	Lois Mooney	Recurring role
2001	100 Centre Street	Lynn Hoffman	Episode: "Bottlecaps"
2002	Law & Order: Criminal Intent	Tessa Rankin	Episode: "Phantom" (S1.E16)
2004	Six Feet Under	Carolyn Pope	3 episodes
2005	Law & Order	Margot Bell	Episode: "Red Ball" (S16.E1)
2006	Heist	Sarah	Recurring role
2006–2008	Grey's Anatomy	Dr. Erica Hahn	Recurring role (seasons 2-3), main cast (seasons 4-5); Nominated — Screen Actors Guild Award for Outstanding Performance by an Ensemble in a Drama Series
2007	Crossing Jordan	Dr. Kate Switzer	Recurring role (season 6)
2007	Dirty Sexy Money	Andrea Smithson	Episode: "Pilot"
2007	Law & Order	Ms. Kurland	Episode: "Captive" (S17.E20)
2007	Weeds	Valerie Scottson	Recurring role (season 3)
2010	Criminal Minds	Barbara Lynch	Episode: "Mosley Lane"
2012	Law & Order: Special Victims Unit	Delia Wilson	3 episodes "Rhodium Nights" (S13.E23) "Lost Reputation"(S14.E1) "Above Suspicion" (S14.E2)
2012	American Horror Story: Asylum	Dr. Gardner	Episode: "The Coat Hanger"
2013	Graceland	Marianne O'Connor	Episode: "Pilot"
2013–2015	Ray Donovan	Frances Simpson	Recurring role (seasons 1–3)
2016	Nashville	Jackie Hudson	Episode: "It's Sure Gonna Hurt"
2016	Stitchers	Dr. Naomi Burke	Episode: "The Two Deaths of Jamie B."
2017	Hand of God	Lesley Levay	Episode: "I See That Now"
2017	Bosch	Captain Ellen Lewis	Recurring role (season 3)
2017	Bates Motel	Sheriff Jane Greene	Recurring role (season 5)
2018	Supergirl	Jacqueline Nimball	Episode: "Schott Through the Heart"
2018	The Crossing	Diana	3 episodes
2018	The Good Doctor	Sybil Meeks	Episode: "Tough Titmouse"
2018	Chicago Med	Amber Young	Episode: "Death Do Us Part"
2019	Project Blue Book	Sara Downing	Episode: "The Flatwoods Monster "
2019	The Act	Myra	Episode: "Stay Inside"
2019	The Good Fight	Zelda Raye	Episode: "The One with the Celebrity Divorce"
2019	Unbelievable	Dara Kaplan	Episode #1.7
2019	Prism	Bec Jamison	Unsold pilot
2020	Chris Watts: Confessions of a Killer	Tammy Lee	TV film
2020–2021	Big Sky	Merilee Legarski	Recurring role (season 1)
2021	FBI: Most Wanted	Flora Matthews	Episode: "Winner"
2021	Them	Helen Koistra	3 episodes
2023	Class of '09	Drew	Miniseries; main cast
2023	Law & Order	Attorney Allison Dumont	Episode: "Private Lives" (S22.E19)
2024	Grotesquerie	Gale Hanover	Recurring role
2025	The Recruit	Marcy Potter	Recurring role (season 2)
2025	The Hunting Party	Carol Miller	Episode: "Mark Marsden" (S1.E7)
2026	Chicago Fire	Jean Williams	2 episodes

== Books ==
- Sunday Matinee: Photographs by Brooke Smith (Radio Raheem, 2022)
