= Brandon Butler =

American actor (born 1996)

- Born: Frankfort, Illinois, U.S.
- Occupation: Actor
- Years active: 2009–present

Brandon Butler is an American actor. He is recognized for portraying Scott Reed in the Netflix series 13 Reasons Why (2017–2020) and Brady Finch in the Netflix series Trinkets (2019–2020).

== Career ==
In 2018, Butler appeared during the second season of the Netflix series 13 Reasons Why, portraying the role of Scott Reed. He was then cast to portray Brady Finch in the drama series Trinkets (2019–2020), based on the Kirsten Smith's novel Trinkets (2013). Butler appeared in the military drama series SEAL Team, where he portrayed Brad. In 2023, he was cast in the film Rockbottom as Bryce Cooper, and later appeared in the Peacock series Hysteria!.

In 2025, Butler assumed the role of Zack Brady on Days of Our Lives. In August of the following year, it was announced he would return to Days of Our Lives as a new character, Mason Whitfield. Scenes concerning Butler's debut in the role were released on September 1 of the same year.

== Filmography ==
Acting roles
Year	Title	Role	Notes
2009	Never	Young Boy	Short film
2009	Emergency	Sleeping child	Short film
2010	Taking Flight	Lead mully	Short film
2011	Sister Mary	Choir boy	
2014	Spoilers: The Movie	Peter	
2016	General Hospital	Frat guy #1	
2018–2020	13 Reasons Why	Scott Reed	13 episodes
2019	Ring of Silence	Luke	
2019–2020	Trinkets	Brady Finch	Main role
2021–2024	SEAL Team	Brad	4 episodes
2023	Dark Highway	Ethan	
2024	Rockbottom	Bryce Cooper	
2024	Hysteria!	Ryan Hudson	3 episodes
2024	Breathe	Craig London	
2025	Days of Our Lives	Zack Brady	Guest role
2026	Days of Our Lives	Mason Whitfield	Series regular
