= Rhiannon Leigh Wryn =

American actress

Rhiannon Wryn
- Born: January 4, 2000 (age 26)
- Occupation: Actress
- Years active: 2003–2018

Rhiannon Wryn (formerly credited as Rhiannon Leigh Wryn) is an American former actress. She had lead roles in the 2007 film The Last Mimzy and the 2010 film Monster Mutt. She was nominated for both a Saturn Award and a Young Artist Award for her performance in The Last Mimzy.

== Career ==
In 2007, she co-starred in Robert Shaye’s science fiction adventure drama The Last Mimzy, portraying Emma Wilder, a seven-year-old who, alongside her brother, discovers a box of mysterious devices sent from the future that grant telepathic and telekinetic abilities.

== Filmography ==
- 2003: Hulk - Young Betty Ross
- 2005: The King of Queens (TV Series) - Little Simone
- 2007: The Last Mimzy - Emma Wilder
- 2008: The Sophisticates - Weezy
- 2011: Monster Mutt - Ashley Taylor
- 2012: Widow Detective (TV Movie) - Ella Jarrett
- 2013: All American Christmas Carol - Scrooge

=== Television ===
Rhiannon Leigh Wryn' television credits
Year	Title	Role	Notes	Ref.
2018	Camping	Tyler	4 episodes	
