= Unholy Night =

- American Horror Story episode
- Episode no.: Season 2 Episode 8
- Directed by: Michael Lehmann
- Written by: James Wong
- Production code: 2ATS08
- Original air date: December 5, 2012
- Running time: 39 minutes

Guest appearances
- Ian McShane as Leigh Emerson; Fredric Lehne as Frank McCann; Britne Oldford as Alma Walker; Barbara Tarbuck as Mother Superior Claudia; Chris McGarry as Mr. Lancaster; Lara Harris as Rhonda Lancaster; Jennifer Holland as Nurse Blackwell; Tehya Scarth as Susie Lancaster

Episode chronology
← Previous "Dark Cousin"	Next → "The Coat Hanger"
- American Horror Story: Asylum

"Unholy Night" is the eighth episode of the second season of the FX anthology television series American Horror Story. The episode, written by executive producer James Wong and directed by Michael Lehmann, originally aired on December 5, 2012.

Ian McShane guest stars as Leigh Emerson, a man who has a psychotic break and kills dressed as Santa Claus. This episode is rated TV-MA (LSV).

== Plot ==
Frank tells Dr. Arden they should report Grace's death to the police. Arden asks if he wants them to know Frank killed Grace, who was unarmed, but Frank says he doesn't care about the consequences.

Jude sneaks into her office and holds a straight razor to Mary Eunice's throat, threatening to end the Devil's possession by killing her. Mary Eunice manages to break Jude's hold and Jude is escorted out of the building. Arden mentions Frank's intentions to Mary Eunice, who claims she will take care of it. Intent on lifting his spirits, she takes a Santa suit to Leigh Emerson, a man who was sent to Briarcliff after going on a killing spree dressed as Santa Claus, and was later put into solitary confinement by Jude.

Lana worries that Mary Eunice hasn't done anything about Dr. Thredson, but she discovers Kit has returned to the asylum. She explains to him that Thredson is the killer and she will prove Kit's innocence. He wants to help her, but can't yet as he's been drugged.

Arden admits to Jude that she was correct about Mary Eunice and seeks Jude's help. He vows loyalty to her if she can return Mary Eunice's innocence. He later lets Jude into the asylum and she tells him she must speak to Mary Eunice alone in the office.

Monsignor Howard commends Mary Eunice for allowing Leigh to have a chance at redemption by allowing him to be unshackled and dressed as Santa. Leigh then attacks Frank and attempts to kill him before orderlies tackle him.

Thredson finds Lana at Briarcliff and tells her he's destroyed all evidence relating to Bloody Face. He attempts to garrotte her, but Kit knocks him unconscious. Lana wants Thredson dead, but Kit needs him alive to show who the real killer is. They hide him in a closet.

Frank puts Leigh back in his solitary cell. Mary Eunice kills Frank in front of the cell. Leigh enters the office where Jude is and they're locked in. Arden states his loyalty to Mary Eunice and leaves. Avenging Jude's cruelty to him, Leigh canes Jude and attempts to rape her, but Jude stabs him with a letter opener.

Arden tries to dispose of Grace's body by giving her to the raspers, but the aliens take her instead.

== Production ==
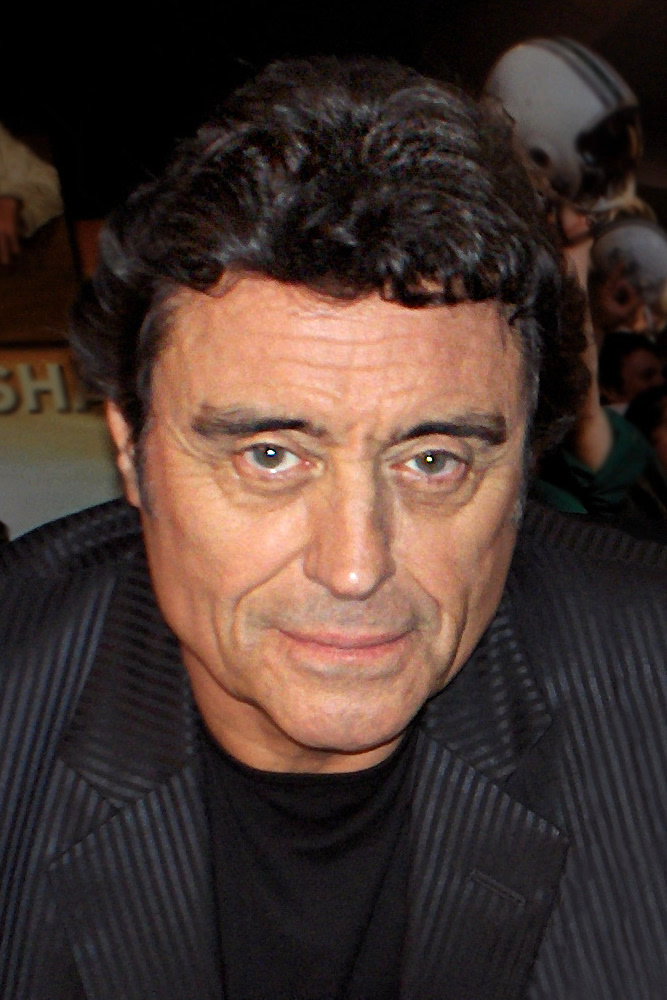
Ian McShane portrays Leigh Emerson, a man who has a psychotic break and begins to kill as Santa Claus in the episode.

"Unholy Night" is written by co-executive producer James Wong and directed by Michael Lehmann.

In a December 2012 interview with Entertainment Weekly, series creator Ryan Murphy spoke about writing this episode with guest star Ian McShane in mind, "Christmas and American Horror Story do not go together and so we were trying to figure out 'What's our version of Christmas?' And the answer of course is a homicidal Santa. There's a whole subgenre in horror dedicated to these psycho Santas. It's a thing. So we decided let's write somebody who's so crazy they end up in Briarcliff. I had heard Ian McShane really loved American Horror Story. So we wrote it and we were like, 'Let's send it to him and ask for a quick pass.' To my delight, he said yes."

== Reception ==
"Unholy Night" was watched by 2.36 million viewers and received an adult 18-49 rating of 1.4, an increase from the previous week's episode.

Rotten Tomatoes reports an 88% approval rating, based on 17 reviews. The critical consensus reads, ""Unholy Night" makes up for its transitional storyline and unanswered questions with a welcome return to the grotesque and a standout scary performance from new cast member Ian McShane." Chris Harnick of The Huffington Post stated he "was a little bit disappointed with this episode." He added, "[Ian] McShane's acting was exceptional, but I wanted a little more progression to the 3,000 plots that are currently going on." Matt Fowler of IGN called "Unholy Night" "just good, sick fun," adding, "It seems a bit slight to call this episode a fun romp, seeing as how bloody and unhinged it was, but watching McShane chew up the set and slash at people with glass tree-toppers was just gruesome enough to make me giddy."
