= You're Killing Me =

2023 film by Beth Hanna and Jerren Lauder

- Theatrical release poster
- Directed by: Beth Hanna; Jerren Lauder
- Written by: Walker Hare; Brad Martocello
- Produced by: Michael Dunaway; Mark Goldberg; Larry Greenberg; Kevin Greene; Seth Ingram; Gerald T. Olsen; Joshua Russell
- Starring: McKaley Miller; Anne Heche; Dermot Mulroney
- Production company: Iris Indie International
- Distributed by: Quiver Distribution
- Release date: April 7, 2023 (United States)
- Country: United States
- Language: English

You're Killing Me is a 2023 American horror thriller film directed by Beth Hanna and Jerren Lauder and written by Walker Hare and Brad Martocello. The film stars McKaley Miller, Anne Heche, and Dermot Mulroney. Produced by Iris Indie International, it was released by Quiver Distribution on April 7, 2023.

== Plot ==
Eden Murphy is a bright, young high school student hoping to get into Pembroke University on a scholarship. She's currently on the waitlist but just needs that extra push to secure her place and sees Barrett Schroder, the son of a congressman, the perfect way in. One day after school she asks him politely if she could get a meeting with his father, but he brushes her off.

Desperate to get into Pembroke, she takes her friend Zara with her to Barrett's Heaven and Hell party at his mansion and hopes to convince him to support her scholarship further. Her father, who struggles to walk and needs back surgery, drops them off outside of the house. As they enter, Barrett's friend Kendra confiscates their phones for privacy reasons and they continue into the party.

Zara distracts Barrett's friend Gooch while Eden makes contact with Barrett, hoping to bond with him over beer pong. Suddenly, the sister of missing student Melissa arrives demanding to know where her sister is and causes a commotion. Eden takes her home using Barrett's car and as she returns to the party, he invites her into a private room. She tells Barrett the pitch she hopes to make to his father and he is impressed and invites her to a beer pong match. First, Eden has to take care of a drunk Zara and takes her to a bed in one of the rooms.

After winning the beer pong match, Eden goes to check on Zara and finds Gooch in bed with her while she is asleep, Eden pushes him out of the room and sees his phone on the bed. Eden takes a look at his phone and sees selfies he has taken with a passed out Zara. As she scrolls, she finds videos of Barrett, Kendra, and Gooch harassing Melissa as she left for school on the day she disappeared. The videos depict them trying to get her drunk but it cuts off when the battery goes low.

Gooch, in a panic, goes straight to Barrett and Kendra and they try to get inside the room but Eden holds them off. They become more aggressive and Eden tells them she has seen the video and won't let them in. They try to use force while Eden blocks the door using a wardrobe. Barrett forces everyone out of the party and Eden uses this opportunity to grab a phone charger from the other room but is prevented to just in-time by Gooch.

Zara awakes, confused and sleepy. Zara heads to the bathroom where Gooch is tapping on the window. She lets him in, unaware of the situation, and he threatens Eden in order for her to give him the phone. The girls manage to overpower him and trap him in a bath of water in the en-suite. Barrett takes an axe and breaks into the bedroom with Kendra but Eden and Zara have locked themselves in the bathroom and threaten to electrocute Gooch using a hairdryer. Meanwhile, Eden's father is at the gas station and has noticed partygoers leaving, telling him that it's over.

Eden tells Zara to go out of the bathroom window and get help but as she tries, Kendra grabs onto her hand from the other side of the window. In shock, Zara knocks her and Kendra drops off the ladder and impales herself on a blade on the ground below. Eden makes her way outside and tries to get help using Kendra's phone but is chased by Barrett and runs back into the bathroom. Barrett finds Kendra's body and drags it inside, assuring her that it will be okay.

Eden explains the whole situation to Zara but she thinks they should return the phone and go home. Suddenly, Eden's father walks into the house searching for her. He manages to get to the bedroom but is knocked to the ground by Barrett. He threatens to kill him unless Eden gives up the phone. Zara throws the phone towards him when Barrett's parents walk in, demanding to know what's going on.

Congressman Schroder and his wife Astrid gathers everyone in the office to discuss the situation. They use bribery to try and keep Eden, her father, and Zara quiet about the events seen on the phone but Eden wants to see the rest of the footage before deciding. Meanwhile, Kendra has died from her injuries and Barrett is devastated. Astrid gives them a drink before showing them the footage. The rest of the video shows Barrett, angry at Melissa trying to leave, running her over in his car. The three of them take her body and throw it over the bridge.

Eden is horrified by the footage and vows to take the phone to the police. Together with her father and Zara, they attempt to leave but feel dizzy and fall unconscious, indicating that Astrid had spiked their drink. Eden awakes in a car with her father, Zara and the bodies of Kendra and Gooch (who had just been killed by Barrett to hide their secret) and is pushed into the lake by the Schroders. Eden manages to escape with Zara but mourns the death of her father.

She vows revenge and heads straight back to the Schroder mansion. As Congressman Schroder is watching the car-recovery on the news, he realizes two bodies are unaccounted for when Eden sneaks up behind him and kills him with an axe. Upstairs, Astrid is clearing up the mess from the bathroom when she is attacked by Eden. Astrid quickly dodges it and the two get into a fight. Eden pushes her into the bathtub of water followed by the hairdryer, electrocuting Astrid.

Barrett comes home to find his parents dead and arms himself with a rifle. He goes outside to see Eden in his car and she instantly runs him over. She gets out of the car to face him and picks up the rifle but can't bring herself to kill him and falls to the floor crying and bleeding out from her fight with Astrid. Barrett, severely injured, gets up and prepares to attack Eden but is hit in the back of the head with the butt of the rifle by Zara.

Barrett lays on the floor bleeding out as the two girls reflect on the violence of the night, with the sound of sirens fast approaching.

== Cast ==
- McKaley Miller as Eden Murphy
- Anne Heche as Astrid Schroder
- Dermot Mulroney as Congressman Schroder
- Brice Anthony Heller as Barrett Schroder
- Keyara Milliner as Zara
- Morgana Van Peebles as Kendra
- Wil Deusner as Gooch
- Jayson Warner Smith as Joel Murphy

== Production ==
The film was announced by Deadline Hollywood in 2022, that Anne Heche, Dermot Mulroney, and McKaley Miller were set to star in the film which was formerly titled "Full Ride", directed by Jerren Lauder and Beth Hanna, and distributed by Quiver Distribution with filming wrapping in Georgia. Heche was killed in a car accident in August 2022, while You're Killing Me was in post-production.

== Release ==
The film was released in select theaters and on video on demand on April 7, 2023.

== Critical reception ==
Reviews have been positive. The review aggregator Rotten Tomatoes reported an approval rating of 86%. Film Nation's Roger Moore calls it "a tight formulaic thriller with snatches of suspense, struggling through panic problem-solving, a somewhat high body count and a final iconic and seriously badass image of the late Anne Heche."
