= The Coat Hanger =

- American Horror Story episode
- Episode no.: Season 2 Episode 9
- Directed by: Jeremy Podeswa
- Written by: Jennifer Salt
- Production code: 2ATS09
- Original air date: December 12, 2012
- Running time: 40 minutes

Guest appearances
- Ian McShane as Leigh Emerson; Frances Conroy as The Angel of Death; Fredric Lehne as Frank McCann; Barbara Tarbuck as Mother Superior Claudia; Brooke Smith as Dr. Gardner; Mary-Pat Green as Nun; Cyd Strittmatter as Nun; Rebecca Metz as Lorene; John Pleshette as Committee Chairman; Dylan McDermott as Johnny Morgan (uncredited)

Episode chronology
← Previous "Unholy Night"	Next → "The Name Game"
- American Horror Story: Asylum

"The Coat Hanger" is the ninth episode and mid-season finale of the second season of the FX anthology television series American Horror Story. The episode, written by co-executive producer Jennifer Salt and directed by Jeremy Podeswa, originally aired on December 12, 2012. This episode is rated TV-MA (LSV).

In the episode, Lana (Sarah Paulson) and Kit (Evan Peters) get Dr. Thredson (Zachary Quinto) to confess to being the serial killer; Dr. Arden (James Cromwell) convinces Kit to temporarily die and force the aliens to return; Sister Jude (Jessica Lange) gets officially removed from her position and admitted as a patient, causing Monsignor Howard (Joseph Fiennes) to lead a penitent Leigh (Ian McShane) to be baptized with disastrous results; and a modern-day serial killer (Dylan McDermott) seeks therapy. Ian McShane reprises his role from the previous episode.

== Plot ==
Flashing forward to 2012, Johnny Morgan meets with a therapist to discuss his compulsive behavior; a compulsion to skin women, including Teresa. He discovered what has caused his compulsions by learning that he is the son of Dr. Thredson and Lana. The therapist's next client later finds her dead as Johnny enters behind her, covered in her blood.

Sister Mary Eunice tells Lana she's pregnant, and Lana lies and states Dr. Thredson didn't rape her. Lana then tells captive Thredson she's pregnant, and threatens to abort the baby. She convinces him to state why he killed three women, while Kit secretly records this, so that the police will know that he is innocent of Thredson's murders. Thredson notices Kit, but Kit then hides the recording, and Lana says to Thredson she aborted the baby the previous night. Mary Eunice however tells Lana the baby is still alive, and is a boy.

Monsignor Howard visits a strapped-down Jude to inform her that the hospital board has officially stripped her of both position and clerical standing, having been framed for Frank's murder. She is now known as Judy. The monsignor allows Leigh to forgive Judy of his mistreatment while in her care.

Arden tells Kit that he believes his story about aliens, after Grace disappeared. Arden asks Kit's permission to almost kill him, while also saying he doesn't need his permission to do so, as to summon the aliens. Kit consents. Arden does this, and the aliens arrive and Arden finds Pepper and a full-term pregnant Grace.

Judy sits at Lana's table in the dayroom and apologizes for mistreating her. She promises to help Lana get out of the asylum, which Lana does not believe.

In the asylum chapel, the monsignor offers to baptize the penitent Leigh, who hopes his only hell has been on Earth. Leigh gets baptized, then he violently holds the monsignor underwater and nails him to a crucifix. Shachath appears, as the monsignor begs for help.

== Production ==
"The Coat Hanger" is written by co-executive producer Jennifer Salt and directed by The Tudors alum Jeremy Podeswa.

In a December 2012 interview with Entertainment Weekly, guest star Dylan McDermott spoke about being in the second season of American Horror Story, "I loved doing the show. It's like being home for me. We talked about it I think early in the season. He [Ryan Murphy] called me over the summer and we were trying to figure out what was the best plan and in what capacity. I wasn't sure myself and obviously he's the master and the genius that figures this shit out. So the day the show premiered he called me and he explained it to me because I hadn't read any of the scripts. He explained to me what my character was going to be and I was like, 'Are you fucking kidding me? I love this! I love this! It's beyond!' To play the modern day Bloody Face and to have this whole back story of a guy who's thrown away and aborted and still lived! It was just like, are you kidding me? It was music to my ears, maybe nobody else's. But to me? I couldn't believe it. It's so twisted and dark and fucked up. That's why I'm on the show because I love stuff like that."

Series creator Ryan Murphy also commented about McDermott's therapy scene, "As soon as we wrote this scene, I said, 'Couldn't Dylan play this part? Does he look enough like Zach[ary Quinto] and Sarah [Paulson]?' And we all held up pictures in the writer's room. We wrote one scene and I offered it to him so that was a happy accident. And then Brooke Smith just auditioned [for the therapist] and that was a happy accident. I do think it came together in a weird tribute to many things but that was all by accident."

== Reception ==
"The Coat Hanger" was watched by 2.22 million viewers and received an adult 18-49 rating of 1.3, down from the past two weeks' episodes.

Rotten Tomatoes reports a 100% approval rating, based on 16 reviews. The critical consensus reads, ""The Coat Hanger" boasts controversial themes, effective scares, well-played justification of the illogical, and noteworthy performances all around." Matt Fowler of IGN thought "The Coat Hanger" was "a bit busy; focusing in on all the characters and most of the storylines", but added, "It also revved up the story a bit and gave us all some tough meat to chew on over the break." Emily VanDerWerff of The A.V. Club stated, "It's kind of depressing that at this point in the show's run, an episode... is run of the mill, but that's the point we've reached with American Horror Story, and I'm not sure I'd have it any other way."
