= Todd Tucker (director) =

American film director

Todd Tucker is an American film director, producer and makeup artist. His first major film was as a key artist on Hook.

In 2010, Todd founded Illusion Industries, a special make-up effects studio. The studio has locations in Louisiana, Panama, and Russia.

He has directed the film Monster Mutt (2011) and has co-produced films such as Night of the Demons (2009) and Trailer Park of Terror (2008). He has also worked in the make-up department of films such as The Smurfs (2011), Watchmen (2009), The Curious Case of Benjamin Button Scary Movie 4 (2006) and Star Trek VI: The Undiscovered Country (1991), as well as for the television series Friends, Wizards of Waverly Place and Hannah Montana.

In 2009, he was nominated for the Fangoria Chainsaw Award for Best Make-Up/Creature FX for the film Trailer Park of Terror.

== Career ==
Todd Tucker landed his first major make-up effects artist job on Steven Spielberg's Hook. He went on to work on films such as The Mask, The Passion of the Christ, Pirates of the Caribbean: The Curse of the Black Pearl, and The Curious Case of Benjamin Button. His television career includes Charmed, Friends, Wizards of Waverly Place, and That's So Raven. He acted as the lead puppeteer on Van Helsing and Jingle All the Way.

After founding Illusion Industries, Todd went on to work on films such as G.I. Joe: Retaliation, The Smurfs 2, and crime drama The Iceman. Illusion Industries works in everything from prosthetic makeup to animatronics, puppets and specialty costumes.

Todd became a Directors Guild of America director and started directing on second units. He mostly directed effects shots, knowing best how to shoot the effects he himself had helped create. He came up with the film Monster Mutt, his first foray into lead directing. His next major project was The Terror of Hallow's Eve, which premiered at FrightFest in London on August 28, 2017.

== Filmography ==
=== Director ===
- The Terror of Hallow's Eve (2017)
- Monster Mutt (2011)

=== Producer ===
- Trailer Park of Terror (2008) - co-producer
- Soccer Mom - co-producer
- Night of the Demons - co-producer
