= McKaley Miller =

American actress (born 1996)

- Born: McKaley Nicole Miller; May 14, 1996 (age 30); Dallas, Texas, U.S.
- Occupation: Actress
- Years active: 2006–present

McKaley Nicole Miller (born May 14, 1996) is an American actress. She is known for her recurring teenager roles as Dana Monohan on the ABC series The Gates in 2010 and as Rose Hattenbarger on The CW series Hart of Dixie from 2011 to 2015.

== Career ==
Miller was born in Dallas, Texas. Her first notable acting role was in the 2006 television film Inspector Mom starring Danica McKellar. She also appeared in a few independent films. In 2011, Miller appeared as Talia in a three episode stint on the Disney Channel sitcom Wizards of Waverly Place, as the love interest to Jake T. Austin's character Max Russo.

She co-starred in the 2013 film The Iceman, playing the daughter of Winona Ryder's character. In 2014, she appeared in the short-lived sitcom Partners, playing the stepdaughter of Kelsey Grammer's character. She also guest starred on the MTV series Awkward as a love interest for Matty Mckibben. In 2015, she guest starred on the series Scream Queens as Sophia.

Early in her career, Miller was also a competitive dancer, with more than six years of experience in jazz, hip hop, clogging, tap, lyrical and ballet.

== Filmography ==
Film roles
Year	Title	Role	Notes
2011	Grand Prix: The Winning Tale	Flirty Little Girl	
2011	Traveling	Kaylee	
2012	General Education	Emily Collins	
2013	The Iceman	Anabel Kuklinski	
2014	Wish I Was Here	Nicole	Uncredited
2014	Where Hope Grows	Katie Campbell	
2016	Super Novas	Tracey	
2016	The Standoff	Sophie Jackson	
2019	Ma	Haley	
2020	Butter	Anna	
2023	You're Killing Me	Eden	
2024	Rockbottom	Alex	
TBA	Roll with It	Samantha	Post-production
TBA	Unfollowed	Maddie Sullivan	

Television roles
Year	Title	Role	Notes
2006	Inspector Mom	Friend of Tara	Television movie
2010	The Gates	Dana Monohan	Recurring role, 8 episodes
2011	Wizards of Waverly Place	Talia Robinson	3 episodes
2011–2015	Hart of Dixie	Rose Hattenbarger	Recurring role, 21 episodes
2013	Awkward	Bailey	3 episodes
2014	Partners	Lizzie Braddock	Main role
2015	Bones	Cayla Seligman	Episode: "The Lost in the Found"
2015	K.C. Undercover	Eliza Montgomery	Episode: "First Friend"
2015	Nicky, Ricky, Dicky & Dawn	Emily	Episode: "Take the Money and Run"
2015	Scream Queens	Sophia Doyle	3 episodes
2016	Faking It	Rachel	Episodes: "Jagged Little Heart", "Third Wheels"
2016	Speechless	Claire	Episodes: "D-A-T-E-- DATE?", "R-A-Y-C-- RAY-CATION"
2017	Drink Slay Love	Bethany	Television movie
2018	Charmed	Brenda	Episode: "Kappa Spirit"
2019	Into the Dark	Jo	Episode: "Pure"
2019–2020	Dwight in Shining Armor	Agnet	Episodes: "Agnet", "Four Weddings and a Health Code Violation"
2020, 2022	9-1-1: Lone Star	Brianna	Episodes: "Act of God", "The ATX-Files", "The New Hotness"
2025	Dexter: Resurrection	Shauna	Episodes: "A Beating Heart...", "Camera Shy"
