= 68th Primetime Creative Arts Emmy Awards =

2016 American television programming awards

- Date: September 10–11, 2016
- Location: Microsoft Theater; Los Angeles, California
- Presented by: Academy of Television Arts & Sciences
- Most awards: Game of Thrones (9)
- Most nominations: Game of Thrones; Saturday Night Live (15)

Television/radio coverage
- Network: FXX

The 68th Annual Primetime Creative Arts Emmy Awards ceremony was held over two nights on September 10 and 11, 2016. The nominations were announced on July 14, 2016. The ceremony is in conjunction with the annual Primetime Emmy Awards and is presented in recognition of technical and other similar achievements in American television programming, including guest acting roles. The awards were announced on September 10 and 11, 2016.

== Winners and nominees ==
Winners are listed first and highlighted in bold:

=== Governor's Award ===
- **American Idol**

=== Programs ===
Programs
**Outstanding Structured Reality Program**: **Shark Tank (ABC)**; Antiques Roadshow (PBS); Diners, Drive-Ins and Dives (Food Network); Lip Sync Battle (Spike TV); MythBusters (Discovery Channel); Undercover Boss (CBS)	**Outstanding Unstructured Reality Program**: **Born This Way (A&E)**; Deadliest Catch (Discovery Channel); Gaycation with Ellen Page (Viceland); Intervention (A&E); Project Greenlight (HBO); United Shades of America (CNN)
**Outstanding Variety Special**: **The Late Late Show Carpool Karaoke Prime Time Special (CBS)**; Adele Live in New York City (NBC); Amy Schumer: Live at the Apollo (HBO); The Kennedy Center Honors (CBS); Lemonade (HBO)	**Outstanding Informational Series or Special**: **Anthony Bourdain: Parts Unknown (CNN)**; Inside the Actors Studio (Bravo); StarTalk with Neil deGrasse Tyson (Nat Geo); The Story of God with Morgan Freeman (Nat Geo); Vice (HBO)
**Outstanding Documentary or Nonfiction Series**: **Making a Murderer (Netflix)**; American Masters (PBS); Chef's Table (Netflix); The Seventies (CNN); Woman with Gloria Steinem (Viceland)	**Outstanding Documentary or Nonfiction Special**: **What Happened, Miss Simone? (Netflix)**; Becoming Mike Nichols (HBO); Everything Is Copy – Nora Ephron: Scripted & Unscripted (HBO); Listen to Me Marlon (Showtime); Mapplethorpe: Look at the Pictures (HBO)
**Outstanding Animated Program**: **Archer (Episode: "The Figgis Agency") (FX)**; Bob's Burgers (Episode: "The Horse Rider-er") (Fox); Phineas and Ferb (Episode: "Last Day of Summer") (Disney XD); The Simpsons (Episode: "Halloween of Horror") (Fox); South Park (Episode: "You're Not Yelping") (Comedy Central)	**Outstanding Short-Format Animation**: **Robot Chicken (Episode: "Robot Chicken Christmas Special: The X-Mas United") (Adult Swim)**; Adventure Time (Episode: "The Hall of Egress") (Cartoon Network); The Powerpuff Girls (Episode: "Once Upon a Townsville") (Cartoon Network); SpongeBob SquarePants (Episode: "Company Picnic") (Nickelodeon); Steven Universe (Episode: "The Answer") (Cartoon Network)
**Outstanding Children's Program**: **It's Your 50th Christmas, Charlie Brown! (ABC)**; Dog with a Blog (Disney Channel); Girl Meets World (Disney Channel); Nick News with Linda Ellerbee: Hello, I Must Be Going! 25 Years of Nick News with Linda Ellerbee (Nickelodeon); School of Rock (Nickelodeon)	**Outstanding Special Class Program**: **Grease: Live (Fox)**; 69th Tony Awards (CBS); 73rd Golden Globe Awards (NBC); 88th Academy Awards (ABC); Super Bowl 50 Halftime Show (CBS)
**Outstanding Short Form Nonfiction or Reality Series**: **Inside Look: The People v. O. J. Simpson: American Crime Story (FX Networks)**; Jay Leno's Garage (NBC.com); National Endowment for the Arts: United States of Arts (arts.gov); Roots: A New Vision (History); A Year in Space (TIME.com)	**Exceptional Merit in Documentary Filmmaking**: **Cartel Land (A&E)**; **Jim: The James Foley Story (HBO)**; The Black Panthers: Vanguard of the Revolution (PBS); The Hunting Ground (CNN); Racing Extinction (Discovery Channel); Winter on Fire: Ukraine's Fight for Freedom (Netflix)
**Outstanding Short Form Comedy or Drama Series**: **Childrens Hospital (Adult Swim)**; Fear the Walking Dead: Flight 462 (AMC); Hack Into Broad City (ComedyCentral.com); Her Story (YouTube); UnREAL: The Auditions (Lifetime)	**Outstanding Short Form Variety Series**: **Park Bench with Steve Buscemi (AOL)**; Epic Rap Battles of History (YouTube); Gay of Thrones (funnyordie.com); Honest Trailers (YouTube); Making a Scene with James Franco (AOL)

=== Acting ===
Acting
**Outstanding Guest Actor in a Comedy Series**: **Peter Scolari as Tad Horvath on Girls (Episode: "Good Man") (HBO)**; Larry David as Himself on Saturday Night Live (Episode: "Host: Larry David") (NBC); Tracy Morgan as Himself on Saturday Night Live (Episode: "Host: Tracy Morgan") (NBC); Martin Mull as Bob Bradley on Veep (Episode: "The Eagle") (HBO); Bob Newhart as Arthur Jeffries on The Big Bang Theory (Episode: "The Opening Night Excitation") (CBS); Bradley Whitford as Magnus Hirschfeld on Transparent (Episode: "Oscillate") (Amazon)	**Outstanding Guest Actress in a Comedy Series**: **Tina Fey and Amy Poehler as Themselves on Saturday Night Live (Episode: "Host: Tina Fey & Amy Poehler") (NBC)**; Christine Baranski as Dr. Beverly Hofstadter on The Big Bang Theory (Episode: "The Convergence Convergence") (CBS); Melora Hardin as Tammy Cashman on Transparent (Episode: "Flicky-Flicky Thump-Thump") (Amazon); Melissa McCarthy as Herself on Saturday Night Live (Episode: "Host: Melissa McCarthy") (NBC); Laurie Metcalf as Mary Cooper on The Big Bang Theory (Episode: "The Convergence Convergence") (CBS); Amy Schumer as Herself on Saturday Night Live (Episode: "Host: Amy Schumer") (NBC)
**Outstanding Guest Actor in a Drama Series**: **Hank Azaria as Ed Cochran on Ray Donovan (Episode: "One Night in Yerevan") (Showtime)**; Mahershala Ali as Remy Danton on House of Cards (Episode: "Chapter 44") (Netflix); Reg E. Cathey as Freddy Hayes on House of Cards (Episode: "Chapter 50") (Netflix); Michael J. Fox as Louis Canning on The Good Wife (Episode: "Taxed") (CBS); Paul Sparks as Thomas Yates on House of Cards (Episode: "Chapter 49") (Netflix); Max von Sydow as The Three-Eyed Raven on Game of Thrones (Episode: "The Door") (HBO)	**Outstanding Guest Actress in a Drama Series**: **Margo Martindale as Claudia on The Americans (Episode: "The Magic of David Copperfield V: The Statue of Liberty Disappears") (FX)**; Ellen Burstyn as Elizabeth Hale on House of Cards (Episode: "Chapter 41") (Netflix); Allison Janney as Margaret Scully on Masters of Sex (Episode: "Matters of Gravity") (Showtime); Laurie Metcalf as Sarah Marsh on Horace and Pete (Episode: "Episode 3") (louisck.net); Molly Parker as Jackie Sharp on House of Cards (Episode: "Chapter 45") (Netflix); Carrie Preston as Elsbeth Tascioni on The Good Wife (Episode: "Targets") (CBS)
**Outstanding Character Voice-Over Performance**: **Seth MacFarlane as Peter Griffin, Stewie Griffin, Brian Griffin, Glenn Quagmire, Dr. Hartman, Tom Tucker, and Mr. Spacely on Family Guy (Episode: "Pilling Them Softly") (Fox)**; Keegan-Michael Key as American Ranger and Sgt. Agony on SuperMansion (Episode: "Puss in Books") (Crackle); Trey Parker as Eric Cartman and PC Principal on South Park (Episode: "Stunning and Brave") (Comedy Central); Chris Pine as Dr. Devizo and Robo-Dino on SuperMansion (Episode: "The Inconceivable Escape of Dr. Devizo") (Crackle); Matt Stone as Craig Tucker, Tweek, and Thomas Tucker on South Park (Episode: "Tweek x Craig") (Comedy Central)	**Outstanding Narrator**: **Keith David on Jackie Robinson (PBS)**; David Attenborough on Life Story (Episode: "First Steps") (Discovery Channel); Adrien Brody on Breakthrough (Episode: "Decoding the Brain") (Nat Geo); Laurence Fishburne on Roots (History); Anthony Mendez on Jane the Virgin (Episode: "Chapter Thirty-Four") (The CW)
**Outstanding Actor in a Short Form Comedy or Drama Series**: **Rob Corddry as Dr. Blake Downs on Childrens Hospital (Adult Swim)**; Rob Huebel as Dr. Owen Maestro on Childrens Hospital (Adult Swim); Jack McBrayer as Ollie on Your Pretty Face Is Going to Hell (Adult Swim); Oscar Nunez as Jacaguax on The Crossroads of History (History); Lou Diamond Phillips as Chieftain on The Crossroads of History (History)	**Outstanding Actress in a Short Form Comedy or Drama Series**: **Patrika Darbo as Margot Mullen on Acting Dead (ActingDead.com)**; Michelle Ang as Alex on Fear the Walking Dead: Flight 462 (AMC); Erinn Hayes as Lola Spratt on Childrens Hospital (Adult Swim); Tracie Thoms as Gwen on Send Me: an original web series (BET.com); Janet Varney as Denie Silverman on Everyone's Crazy But Us (funnyordie.com)

=== Animation ===
Animation
**Outstanding Individual Achievement in Animation (Juried)**
- **Adventure Time – Tom Herpich (storyboard artist) (Episode: "Stakes Pt. 8: The Dark Cloud") (Cartoon Network)**
- **Adventure Time – Jason Kolowski (production design) (Episode: "Bad Jubies") (Cartoon Network)**
- **He Named Me Malala – Jason Carpenter (production design) (Nat Geo)**
- **Long Live the Royals – Chris Tsirgiotis (background design) (Episode: "Long Live the Royals") (Cartoon Network)**
- **Robot Chicken – Scott DaRos (character animation) (Episode: "Robot Chicken DC Comics Special III: Magical Friendship") (Adult Swim)**

=== Casting ===
Casting
**Outstanding Casting for a Comedy Series**: **Veep - Allison Jones and Beth Harris (HBO)**; Modern Family - Jeff Greenberg (ABC); Silicon Valley - Jeanne McCarthy, Nicole Abellera Hallman, and Leslie Woo (HBO); Transparent - Eyde Belasco (Amazon); Unbreakable Kimmy Schmidt - Cindy Tolan (Netflix)	**Outstanding Casting for a Drama Series**: **Game of Thrones - Nina Gold, Robert Sterne and Carla Stronge (HBO)**; Downton Abbey - Jill Trevellick (PBS); House of Cards - Laray Mayfield and Julie Schubert (Netflix); Mr. Robot - Susie Farris, Beth Bowling and Kim Miscia (USA); Orange Is the New Black - Jennifer Euston (Netflix)
**Outstanding Casting for a Limited Series, Movie, or Special**: **The People v. O. J. Simpson: American Crime Story - Jeanne McCarthy, Nicole Abellera Hallman, Courtney Bright, and Nicole Daniels (FX)**; Fargo - Rachel Tenner, Jackie Lind, and Stephanie Gorin (FX); Grease: Live - Bernard Telsey, Tiffany Little Canfield, and Justin Huff (Fox); The Night Manager - Jina Jay (AMC); Roots - Victoria Thomas, Moonyeenn Lee, Leo Davids, Lissy Holm, and Meagan Lewis (History)

=== Choreography ===
Choreography
**Outstanding Choreography**
- **Kathryn Burns for Crazy Ex-Girlfriend (Routines: "I'm So Good at Yoga" / "A Boy Band Made Up of Four Joshes" / "Settle for Me") (The CW)**
- **Quest Crew for America's Best Dance Crew (Routines: "Runaway Baby" / "Take U There" / "Summer Thing") (MTV)**
  - Derek Hough for Dancing with the Stars (Routines: "Footprints in the Sand" / "Grace Kelly" / "Cry Little Sister") (ABC)
  - Anthony Morigerato for So You Think You Can Dance (Routines: "Dibidy Dop") (Fox)
  - Travis Wall for So You Think You Can Dance (Routines: "Beautiful Friends" / "November" / "Gimme All Your Love") (Fox)

=== Cinematography ===
Cinematography
**Outstanding Cinematography for a Multi-Camera Series**: **Nicky, Ricky, Dicky & Dawn – John Simmons (Episode: "Go Hollywood") (Nickelodeon)**; The Big Bang Theory – Steven V. Silver (Episode: "The Convergence Convergence") (CBS); Mom – Steven V. Silver (Episode: "Sticky Hands and a Walk on the Wild Side") (CBS); The Soul Man – George Mooradian (Episode: "White Trash") (TV Land)	**Outstanding Cinematography for a Single-Camera Series**: **The Man in the High Castle – James Hawkinson (Episode: "The New World") (Amazon)**; Bates Motel – John S. Bartley (Episode: "A Danger to Himself and Others") (A&E); Downton Abbey – Graham Frake (Episode: "Episode Nine") (PBS); Game of Thrones – Gregory Middleton (Episode: "Home") (HBO); Gotham – Crescenzo Giacomo Notarile (Episode: "Azrael") (Fox); Homeland – David Klein (Episode: "The Tradition of Hospitality") (Showtime); House of Cards – David M. Dunlap (Episode: "Chapter 45") (Netflix)
**Outstanding Cinematography for a Limited Series or Movie**: **Fargo – Dana Gonzales (Episode: "Waiting for Dutch") (FX)**; Luther – John Conroy (BBC America); The People v. O. J. Simpson: American Crime Story – Nelson Cragg (Episode: "From the Ashes of Tragedy") (FX); Sherlock: The Abominable Bride – Suzie Lavelle (PBS)	**Outstanding Cinematography for Nonfiction Programming**: **Cartel Land – Matthew Heineman and Matt Porwoll (A&E)**; Anthony Bourdain: Parts Unknown – Todd Liebler and Zach Zamboni (Episode: "Cuba") (CNN); He Named Me Malala – Sam Painter (Nat Geo); Mapplethorpe: Look at the Pictures – Huy Truong (HBO); What Happened, Miss Simone? – Igor Martinovic and Rachel Morrison (Netflix)
**Outstanding Cinematography for a Reality Program**: **Life Below Zero (Episode: "Breaking Through") (Nat Geo)**; The Amazing Race (Episode: "We're Only Doing Freaky Stuff Today") (CBS); Deadliest Catch (Episode: "Carpe Diem") (Discovery Channel); Intervention (Episode: "Sierra") (A&E); Project Runway (Episode: "Mad Dash Mayhem") (Lifetime); Survivor (Episode: "Second Chance") (CBS)

=== Commercial ===
Programs
**Outstanding Commercial**
- **"Love Has No Labels" (Ad Council)**
  - "Dear Peyton" (Gatorade)
  - "Marilyn" (Snickers)
  - "Paper" (Honda)
  - "Year in Search 2015" (Google)

=== Costumes ===
Costumes
**Outstanding Costumes for a Contemporary Series, Limited Series, or Movie**: **American Horror Story: Hotel (Episode: "Chutes and Ladders") (FX)**; Empire (Episode: "Past Is Prologue") (Fox); The Good Wife (Episode: "End") (CBS); Grace and Frankie (Episode: "The Party") (Netflix); Transparent (Episode: "Kina Hora") (Amazon)	**Outstanding Costumes for a Period/Fantasy Series, Limited Series, or Movie**: **Game of Thrones (Episode: "The Winds of Winter") (HBO)**; Downton Abbey (Episode: "Episode Eight") (PBS); Outlander (Episode: "Not in Scotland Anymore") (Starz); The People v. O. J. Simpson: American Crime Story (Episode: "Marcia, Marcia, Marcia") (FX); Roots (Episode: "Night One") (History)
**Outstanding Costumes for a Variety, Nonfiction, or Reality Programming**: **The Wiz Live! (NBC)**; Dancing with the Stars (Episode: "Disney Night") (ABC); Grease: Live (Fox); RuPaul's Drag Race (Episode: "Keeping it 100!") (Logo); Saturday Night Live (Episode: "Host: Ryan Gosling") (NBC)

=== Directing ===
Directing
**Outstanding Directing for Nonfiction Programming**: **Laura Ricciardi and Moira Demos for Making a Murderer (Episode: "Fighting for Their Lives") (Netflix)**; Liz Garbus for What Happened, Miss Simone? (Netflix); David Gelb for Chef's Table (Episode: "Gaggan Anand") (Netflix); Davis Guggenheim for He Named Me Malala (Nat Geo); Matthew Heineman for Cartel Land (A&E)	**Outstanding Directing for a Variety Series**: **Inside Amy Schumer (Episode: "Madonna/Whore"), Directed by Ryan McFaul (Comedy Central)**; Last Week Tonight with John Oliver (Episode: "Episode 303"), Directed by Paul Pennolino (HBO); The Late Late Show with James Corden (Episode: "Post-Super Bowl Episode"), Directed by Tim Mancinelli (CBS); Saturday Night Live (Episode: "Host: Tina Fey & Amy Poehler"), Directed by Don Roy King (NBC); The Tonight Show Starring Jimmy Fallon (Episode: "Episode 325"), Directed by Dave Diomedi (NBC)

=== Hairstyling ===
Hairstyling
**Outstanding Hairstyling for a Single-Camera Series**: **Downton Abbey (Episode: "Episode Nine") (PBS)**; Game of Thrones (Episode: "The Door") (HBO); The Knick (Episode: "Williams and Walker") (Cinemax); Masters of Sex (Episode: "Matters of Gravity") (Showtime); Penny Dreadful (Episode: "Glorious Horrors") (Showtime)	**Outstanding Hairstyling for a Multi-Camera Series or Special**: **Saturday Night Live (Episode: "Host: Fred Armisen") (NBC)**; Dancing with the Stars (Episode: "The Finals: Part 1") (ABC); Grease: Live (Fox); Key & Peele (Episode: "Y'all Ready for This?") (Comedy Central); The Wiz Live! (NBC)
**Outstanding Hairstyling for a Limited Series or Movie**: **The People v. O. J. Simpson: American Crime Story (FX)**; All the Way (HBO); American Horror Story: Hotel (FX); Fargo (FX); Roots (Episode: "Night One") (History)

=== Hosting ===
Hosting
**Outstanding Host for a Reality or Reality-Competition Program**
- **RuPaul Charles for RuPaul's Drag Race (Logo)**
  - Tom Bergeron for Dancing with the Stars (ABC)
  - Steve Harvey for Little Big Shots starring Steve Harvey (NBC)
  - Heidi Klum and Tim Gunn for Project Runway (Lifetime)
  - Jane Lynch for Hollywood Game Night (NBC)
  - Ryan Seacrest for American Idol (Fox)

=== Interactive Media ===
Interactive Media
**Outstanding Original Interactive Program (Juried)**: **Henry (Oculus Story Studio)**	**Outstanding Multiplatform Storytelling (Juried)**: **Archer Scavenger Hunt (FX)**
**Outstanding Social TV Experience (Juried)**: **@midnight with Chris Hardwick (Comedy Central)**	**Outstanding User Experience and Visual Design (Juried)**: **Cartoon Network App Experience (Cartoon Network)**
**Outstanding Interactive Program**: **The Late Late Show with James Corden (CBS / CBS Interactive)**; Conan (TBS); Game of Thrones: Main Titles 360 Experience (HBO / Elastic); Saturday Night Live: Interactive Experience (NBC / NBC Entertainment); Talking Dead: Interactive Experience (AMC)

=== Lighting Design / Direction ===
Lighting Design / Direction
**Outstanding Lighting Design / Lighting Direction for a Variety Series**: **The Voice (Episode: "Episode 917A") (NBC)**; American Idol (Episode: "Finale") (Fox); Dancing with the Stars (Episode: "The Finals: Part 2") (ABC); Saturday Night Live (Episode: "Host: Tina Fey & Amy Poehler") (NBC); So You Think You Can Dance (Episode: "Season 12 Finale") (Fox)	**Outstanding Lighting Design / Lighting Direction for a Variety Special**: **Grease: Live (Fox)**; 88th Academy Awards (ABC); Adele Live in New York City (NBC); Super Bowl 50 Halftime Show (CBS); The Wiz Live! (NBC)

=== Main Title Design ===
Main Title Design
**Outstanding Main Title Design**
- **The Man in the High Castle (Amazon)**
  - Marvel's Jessica Jones (Netflix)
  - Narcos (Netflix)
  - The Night Manager (AMC)
  - Vinyl (HBO)

=== Make-up ===
Make-up
**Outstanding Make-up for a Single-Camera Series (Non-Prosthetic)**: **Game of Thrones (Episode: "Battle of the Bastards") (HBO)**; The Knick (Episode: "Whiplash") (Cinemax); Penny Dreadful (Episode: "Glorious Horrors") (Showtime); Vikings (Episode: "Yol") (History); Vinyl (Episode: "Pilot") (HBO)	**Outstanding Make-up for a Multi-Camera Series or Special (Non-Prosthetic)**: **Key & Peele (Episode: "Y'all Ready for This?") (Comedy Central)**; Dancing with the Stars (Episode: "Halloween Night") (ABC); Grease: Live (Fox); Saturday Night Live (Episode: "Host: Ryan Gosling") (NBC); The Wiz Live! (NBC)
**Outstanding Make-up for a Limited Series or Movie (Non-Prosthetic)**: **American Horror Story: Hotel (FX)**; All the Way (HBO); Fargo (FX); The People v. O. J. Simpson: American Crime Story (FX); Roots (Episode: "Night One") (History)	**Outstanding Prosthetic Make-up for a Series, Limited Series, Movie, or Special**: **Game of Thrones (Episode: "The Door") (HBO)**; All the Way (HBO); American Horror Story: Hotel (FX); Penny Dreadful (Episode: "And Hell Itself My Only Foe") (Showtime); The Walking Dead (Episode: "No Way Out") (AMC)

=== Music ===
Music
**Outstanding Music Composition for a Series (Original Dramatic Score)**: **Mac Quayle for Mr. Robot (Episode: "eps1.0 hellofriend.mov") (USA)**; Chris Bacon for Bates Motel (Episode: "Forever") (A&E); Sean Callery for Minority Report (Episode: "Pilot") (Fox); Abel Korzeniowski for Penny Dreadful (Episode: "And They Were Enemies") (Showtime); Paul Leonard-Morgan for Limitless (Episode: "Pilot") (CBS); Duncan Thum for Chef's Table (Episode: "Grant Achatz") (Netflix)	**Outstanding Music Composition for a Limited Series, Movie, or Special (Original Dramatic Score)**: **Victor Reyes for The Night Manager (Episode: "Episode 2") (AMC)**; Jeff Beal for Jesse Stone: Lost in Paradise (Hallmark Channel); James Newton Howard for All the Way (HBO); David Lawrence for Descendants (Disney Channel); Martin Phipps for War & Peace (Episode: "Part 1") (Lifetime); Jeff Russo for Fargo (Episode: "Loplop") (FX)
**Outstanding Music Direction**: **Danny Elfman's Music from the Films of Tim Burton (Live from Lincoln Center) (PBS)**; Jazz at the White House (ABC); Sinatra: Voice for a Century (Live from Lincoln Center) (PBS); Smithsonian Salutes Ray Charles: In Performance at the White House (PBS); A Very Murray Christmas (Netflix)	**Outstanding Original Music and Lyrics**: **The Hunting Ground (Song: "Til It Happens to You") (CNN)**; Crazy Ex-Girlfriend (Episode: "I'm Going on a Date with Josh's Friend!") (Song: "Settle For Me") (The CW); Empire (Episode: "A Rose by Any Other Name") (Song: "Good People") (Fox); Galavant (Episode: "A New Season aka Suck It Cancellation Bear") (Song: "A New Season") (ABC); Garfunkel and Oates: Trying to Be Special (Song: "Frozen Lullaby") (Vimeo)
**Outstanding Original Main Title Theme Music**: **Sean Callery for Marvel's Jessica Jones (Netflix)**; Rodrigo Amarante for Narcos (Netflix); Rachel Bloom and Adam Schlesinger for Crazy Ex-Girlfriend (The CW); Robert Duncan for The Whispers (ABC); Johnny Klimek and Tom Tykwer for Sense8 (Netflix); Victor Reyes for The Night Manager (AMC)

=== Picture Editing ===
Picture Editing
**Outstanding Single-Camera Picture Editing for a Drama Series**: **Game of Thrones – Tim Porter (Episode: "Battle of the Bastards") (HBO)**; Better Call Saul – Kelley Dixon (Episode: "Rebecca") (AMC); Better Call Saul – Kelley Dixon and Chris McCaleb (Episode: "Nailed") (AMC); Game of Thrones – Katie Weiland (Episode: "Oathbreaker") (HBO); Narcos – Leo Trombetta (Episode: "Descenso") (Netflix)	**Outstanding Single-Camera Picture Editing for a Comedy Series**: **Crazy Ex-Girlfriend – Kabir Akhtar (Episode: "Josh Just Happens to Live Here!") (The CW)**; Silicon Valley – Brian Merken (Episode: "The Uptick") (HBO); Silicon Valley – Tim Roche (Episode: "Daily Active Users") (HBO); Veep – Shawn Paper (Episode: "Mother") (HBO); Veep – Steven Rasch (Episode: "Inauguration") (HBO)
**Outstanding Single-Camera Picture Editing for a Limited Series or Movie**: **The People v. O. J. Simpson: American Crime Story – C. Chi-Yoon Chung (Episode: "The Race Card") (FX)**; Fargo – Skip Macdonald (Episode: "Waiting for Dutch") (FX); Fargo – Skip Macdonald and Curtis Thurber (Episode: "Did you do this? No, you did it!") (FX); The People v. O. J. Simpson: American Crime Story – Adam Penn (Episode: "From the Ashes of Tragedy") (FX); The People v. O. J. Simpson: American Crime Story – Stewart Schill (Episode: "The Verdict") (FX)	**Outstanding Multi-Camera Picture Editing for a Comedy Series**: **The Big Bang Theory – Peter Chakos (Episode: "The Opening Night Excitation") (CBS)**; 2 Broke Girls – Darryl Bates (Episode: "And the Sax Problem") (CBS); Horace and Pete – Gina Sansom (Episode: "Episode 3") (LouisCK.net); Last Man Standing – Kris Trexler (Episode: "The Road Less Driven") (ABC); Mike & Molly – Stephen Prime (Episode: "I See Love") (CBS); Mom – Ben Bosse and Joseph Bella (Episode: "Atticus Finch and the Downtrodden") (CBS)
**Outstanding Picture Editing for Variety Programming**: **Last Week Tonight with John Oliver – Anthony Miale (Segment: "Public Defenders") (HBO)**; Conan – Robert James Ashe, Dave Grecu, and Christopher P. Heller (Episode: "Conan in Korea") (TBS); Drunk History – Jody McVeigh-Schultz (Episode: "Inventors") (Comedy Central); Key & Peele – Rich LaBrie, Neil Mahoney, Nicholas Monsour, and Stephen Waichulis (Episode: "The End") (Comedy Central); Lemonade – Bill Yukich (HBO)	**Outstanding Picture Editing for Nonfiction Programming**: **Making a Murderer – Moira Demos (Netflix)**; Cartel Land – Matthew Hamachek, Matthew Heineman, Bradley J. Ross, and Pax Wassermann (HBO); He Named Me Malala – Greg Finton, Brian Johnson, and Brad Fuller (Nat Geo); Vice – Rebecca Adorno and Roman Safiullin (Episode: "Fighting ISIS") (HBO); What Happened, Miss Simone? – Joshua L. Pearson (Netflix)
**Outstanding Picture Editing for a Structured or Competition Reality Program**: **Who Do You Think You Are? – Mark Cegielski, James Horak, Julie Janata, Elise Ludwig, Justin Robertson, Conrad Stanley, and Shelly Stocking (Episode: "Bryan Cranston") (TLC)**; The Amazing Race – Andy Castor, Julian Gomez, Andrew Kozar, Ryan Leamy, Jennifer Nelson, Paul C. Nielsen, and Jacob Parsons (Episode: "We're Only Doing Freaky Stuff Today") (CBS); Shark Tank – Editing Team (Episode: "Episode 702") (ABC); Survivor – Editing Team (Episode: "Signed, Sealed and Delivered") (CBS); The Voice – Editing Team (Episode: "Episode 1005") (NBC)	**Outstanding Picture Editing for an Unstructured Reality Program**: **Project Greenlight – Steve Lichtenstein, Craig A. Colton, Nena Erb, and Dan Golding (Episode: "Accident Waiting to Happen") (HBO)**; Born This Way – M'daya Meliani, Chris Ray, and Dan Zimmerman, Editor (Episode: "Don't Limit Me") (A&E); Born This Way – Daniel Cerny and Peggy Tachdjian (Episode: "Up Syndrome") (A&E); Deadliest Catch – Josh Earl and Ben Bulatao (Episode: "Carpe Diem") (Discovery Channel); Naked and Afraid XL – Malinda Zehner, Mike Bary, Todd Beabout, Jacob Parsons, Eric Goldfarb, Mike Levine, and Andrew P. Jones (Episode: "40 Days Jungle Rich") (Discovery Channel)

=== Production Design ===
Production Design
**Outstanding Production Design for a Narrative Contemporary or Fantasy Program (One Hour or More)**: **Game of Thrones (Episodes: "Blood of My Blood"; "The Broken Man"; "No One") (HBO)**; American Horror Story: Hotel (FX); House of Cards (Episodes: "Chapter 41"; "Chapter 47"; "Chapter 48") (Netflix); The Man in the High Castle (Episode: "The New World") (Amazon); Penny Dreadful (Episodes: "Fresh Hell"; "Evil Spirits In Heavenly Places"; "And Hell Itself My Only Foe") (Showtime)	**Outstanding Production Design for a Narrative Period Program (One Hour or More)**: **Downton Abbey (Episodes: "Episode Five"; "Episode Seven") (PBS)**; Fargo (Episode: "Waiting for Dutch") (FX); The Knick (Episodes: "Ten Knots"; "The Best With the Best to Get the Best"; "Wonderful Surprises") (Cinemax); Masters of Sex (Episodes: "The Excitement of Release"; "Surrogates"; "Party of Four") (Showtime); Outlander (Episode: "Not In Scotland Anymore"; "Faith") (Starz)
**Outstanding Production Design for a Narrative Program (Half-Hour or Less)**: **Transparent (Episodes: "Kina Hora"; "The Book of Life"; "Man on the Land") (Amazon)**; The Big Bang Theory (Episodes: "The Positive Negative Reaction"; "The Big Bear Precipitation"; "The Fermentation Bifurcation") (CBS); The Muppets (Episodes: "The X Factor"; "Pigs in a Blackout"; "Single All The Way") (ABC); Silicon Valley (Episodes: "Two in the Box"; "Bachmanity Insanity"; "Daily Active Users") (HBO); Veep (Episodes: "The Eagle"; "C**tgate") (HBO)	**Outstanding Production Design for a Variety, Nonfiction, Reality, or Reality-Competition Series**: **Portlandia (Episodes: "Family Emergency"; "Pickathon"; "Weirdo Beach") (IFC)**; Drunk History (Episode: "New Jersey") (Comedy Central); Key & Peele (Episodes: "Y'all Ready For This?"; "The End") (Comedy Central); Saturday Night Live (Episodes: "Host: Tina Fey & Amy Poehler"; "Host: Larry David"; "Host: Peter Dinklage") (NBC); The Voice (Episodes: "Live Finale (Part 2)"; "The Blind Auditions Premiere (Part 2)"; "Live Semifinal Performances") (NBC)
**Outstanding Production Design for a Variety, Nonfiction, Event, or Award Special**: **Grease: Live (Fox)**; 88th Academy Awards (ABC); He Named Me Malala (Nat Geo); Lemonade (HBO); The Wiz Live! (NBC)

=== Sound ===
Sound
**Outstanding Sound Editing for a Series**: **Black Sails (Episode: "XX.") (Starz)**; Game of Thrones (Episode: "The Door") (HBO); Gotham (Episode: "Azrael") (Fox); Marvel's Daredevil (Episode: "New York's Finest") (Netflix); Vikings (Episode: "The Last Ship") (History)	**Outstanding Sound Editing for a Limited Series, Movie, or Special**: **Fargo (Episode: "The Castle") (FX)**; American Horror Story: Hotel (Episode: "Checking In") (FX); The Night Manager (Episode: "Episode 5") (AMC); Roots (Episode: "Night Two") (History); Sherlock: The Abominable Bride (PBS)
**Outstanding Sound Editing for Nonfiction Programming (Single or Multi-Camera)**: **Cartel Land (A&E)**; Anthony Bourdain: Parts Unknown (Episode: "Okinawa") (CNN); He Named Me Malala (Nat Geo); Making a Murderer (Episode: "Lack of Humility") (Netflix); What Happened, Miss Simone? (Netflix)	**Outstanding Sound Mixing for a Comedy or Drama Series (One Hour)**: **Game of Thrones (Episode: "Battle of the Bastards") (HBO)**; Better Call Saul (Episode: "Klick") (AMC); Downton Abbey (Episode: "Episode Nine") (PBS); House of Cards (Episode: "Chapter 52") (Netflix); Mr. Robot (Episode: "eps1.5_br4ve-trave1er.asf") (USA); Ray Donovan (Episode: "Exsuscito") (Showtime)
**Outstanding Sound Mixing for a Limited Series or Movie**: **The People v. O. J. Simpson: American Crime Story (Episode: "From the Ashes of Tragedy") (FX)**; Fargo (Episode: "The Gift of the Magi") (FX); The Night Manager (Episode: "Episode 5") (AMC); Sherlock: The Abominable Bride (PBS); True Detective (Episode: "Down Will Come") (HBO)	**Outstanding Sound Mixing for a Comedy or Drama Series (Half-Hour) and Animation**: **Mozart in the Jungle (Episode: "Nothing Resonates Like Rhinoceros Foreskin") (Amazon)**; Modern Family (Episode: "The Storm") (ABC); Silicon Valley (Episode: "Bachmanity Insanity") (HBO); The Simpsons (Episode: "Halloween of Horror") (Fox); Veep (Episode: "Congressional Ball") (HBO)
**Outstanding Sound Mixing for a Variety Series or Special**: **Danny Elfman's Music from the Films of Tim Burton (Live from Lincoln Center) (PBS)**; 88th Academy Awards (ABC); Grease: Live (Fox); Last Week Tonight with John Oliver (HBO); The Voice (Episode: "Episode 1018A") (NBC)	**Outstanding Sound Mixing for Nonfiction Programming**: **Vice (Episode: "Fighting ISIS") (HBO)**; Anthony Bourdain: Parts Unknown (Episode: "Ethiopia") (CNN); Deadliest Catch (Episode: "Carpe Diem") (Discovery Channel); Making a Murderer (Episode: "Lack of Humility") (Netflix); What Happened, Miss Simone? (Netflix)

=== Special Visual Effects ===
Special Visual Effects
**Outstanding Special Visual Effects**: **Game of Thrones (Episode: "Battle of the Bastards") (HBO)**; Black Sails (Episode: "XX.") (Starz); The Man in the High Castle (Episode: "The New World") (Amazon); Penny Dreadful (Episode: "And They Were Enemies") (Showtime); Vikings (Episode: "The Last Ship") (History)	**Outstanding Special Visual Effects in a Supporting Role**: **Sherlock: The Abominable Bride (PBS)**; 11.22.63 (Episode: "The Rabbit Hole") (Hulu); Better Call Saul (Episode: "Fifi") (AMC); Hannibal (Episode: "Primavera") (NBC); The Walking Dead (Episode: "No Way Out") (AMC)

=== Stunt Coordination ===
Stunt Coordination
**Outstanding Stunt Coordination for a Comedy Series or Variety Program**: **Shameless (Showtime)**; Angie Tribeca (TBS); Brooklyn Nine-Nine (Fox); K.C. Undercover (Disney Channel); Saturday Night Live (NBC)	**Outstanding Stunt Coordination for a Drama Series, Limited Series, or Movie**: **Game of Thrones (HBO)**; The Blacklist (NBC); Gotham (Fox); Marvel's Daredevil (Netflix); Rush Hour (CBS)

=== Technical Direction ===
Technical Direction
**Outstanding Technical Direction, Camerawork, Video Control for a Series**: **Dancing with the Stars (Episode: "The Finals: Part 2") (ABC)**; The Big Bang Theory (Episode: "The Celebration Experimentation") (CBS); Jimmy Kimmel Live! (Episode: "In Brooklyn") (ABC); Last Week Tonight with John Oliver (Episode: "Episode 303") (HBO); Saturday Night Live (Episode: "Host: Ariana Grande") (NBC); The Voice (Episode: "Episode 917A") (NBC)	**Outstanding Technical Direction, Camerawork, Video Control for a Limited Series, Movie, or Special**: **Grease: Live (Fox)**; 69th Tony Awards (CBS); 88th Academy Awards (ABC); Adele Live in New York City (NBC); The Wiz Live! (NBC)

=== Writing ===
Writing
**Outstanding Writing for Nonfiction Programming**: **Making a Murderer (Episode: "Eighteen Years Lost") (Netflix)**; American Experience (Episode: "Walt Disney") (PBS); Anthony Bourdain: Parts Unknown (Episode: "Borneo") (CNN); Everything Is Copy – Nora Ephron: Scripted & Unscripted (HBO); Jackie Robinson (PBS)	**Outstanding Writing for a Variety Series**: **Last Week Tonight with John Oliver (HBO)**; Full Frontal with Samantha Bee (TBS); Inside Amy Schumer (Comedy Central); Key & Peele (Comedy Central); Portlandia (IFC); Saturday Night Live (NBC)

== Wins by network ==
Network	Program	Individual	Total
HBO	1	15	16
FX	3	9	12
Netflix	2	4	6
PBS	0	6	6
Fox	1	4	5
A&E	2	2	4
Adult Swim	2	2	4
Amazon	0	4	4
Cartoon Network	1	3	4
NBC	0	4	4
ABC	2	1	3
CBS	2	1	3
Comedy Central	1	2	3
CNN	1	1	2
The CW	0	2	2
Nat Geo	0	2	2
Showtime	0	2	2
ActingDead.com	0	1	1
AMC	0	1	1
AOL	1	0	1
IFC	0	1	1
Logo	0	1	1
MTV	0	1	1
Nickelodeon	0	1	1
Oculus Story Studio	0	1	1
Starz	0	1	1
TLC	0	1	1
USA	0	1	1

== Programs with multiple awards ==
Program	Awards
Game of Thrones	9
Grease: Live	4
Making a Murderer	4
The People v. O. J. Simpson: American Crime Story	4
Cartel Land	3
American Horror Story: Hotel	2
Childrens Hospital	2
Crazy Ex-Girlfriend	2
Danny Elfman's Music from the Films of Tim Burton (Live from Lincoln Center)	2
Downton Abbey	2
Fargo	2
Last Week Tonight with John Oliver	2
The Late Late Show with James Corden	2
The Man in the High Castle	2
Saturday Night Live	2

== Programs with multiple nominations ==
Program	Nominations
Game of Thrones	15
Saturday Night Live	15
Fargo	10
Grease: Live	9
House of Cards	9
The People v. O. J. Simpson: American Crime Story	9
The Big Bang Theory	7
Dancing with the Stars	7
Roots	7
American Horror Story: Hotel	6
Downton Abbey	6
Making a Murderer	6
The Night Manager	6
Penny Dreadful	6
Veep	6
What Happened, Miss Simone?	6
The Wiz Live!	6
88th Academy Awards	5
Anthony Bourdain: Parts Unknown	5
Cartel Land	5
He Named Me Malala	5
Key & Peele	5
Last Week Tonight with John Oliver	5
Silicon Valley	5
Transparent	5
The Voice	5
All the Way	4
Better Call Saul	4
Childrens Hospital	4
Crazy Ex-Girlfriend	4
Deadliest Catch	4
The Man in the High Castle	4
Sherlock: The Abominable Bride	4
Adele Live in New York City	3
Born This Way	3
Chef's Table	3
The Good Wife	3
Gotham	3
The Knick	3
The Late Late Show with James Corden	3
Lemonade	3
Masters of Sex	3
Mr. Robot	3
Narcos	3
So You Think You Can Dance	3
South Park	3
Vice	3
Vikings	3
69th Tony Awards	2
The Amazing Race	2
American Idol	2
Bates Motel	2
Black Sails	2
Conan	2
The Crossroads of History	2
Danny Elfman's Music from the Films of Tim Burton (Live from Lincoln Center)	2
Drunk History	2
Empire	2
Everything Is Copy – Nora Ephron: Scripted & Unscripted	2
Fear the Walking Dead: Flight 462	2
Horace and Pete	2
The Hunting Ground	2
Inside Amy Schumer	2
Intervention	2
Jackie Robinson	2
Mapplethorpe: Look at the Pictures	2
Marvel's Daredevil	2
Marvel's Jessica Jones	2
Modern Family	2
Mom	2
Outlander	2
Portlandia	2
Project Greenlight	2
Project Runway	2
Ray Donovan	2
RuPaul's Drag Race	2
Shark Tank	2
The Simpsons	2
Super Bowl 50 Halftime Show	2
SuperMansion	2
Survivor	2
Vinyl	2
The Walking Dead	2
