= Mommy (American Horror Story) =

- American Horror Story episode
- Episode no.: Season 5 Episode 3
- Directed by: Bradley Buecker
- Written by: James Wong
- Production code: 5ATS03
- Original air date: October 21, 2015
- Running time: 53 minutes

Guest appearances
- Finn Wittrock as Tristan Duffy; Mare Winningham as Hazel Evers; Naomi Campbell as Claudia Bankson; Max Greenfield as Gabriel; Richard T. Jones as Detective Andy Hahn; Mädchen Amick as Mrs. Ellison; Shree Crooks as Scarlett Lowe; Roxana Brusso as Dr. Kohan; David Naughton as Mr. Samuels; Lennon Henry as Holden Lowe; Lyric Lennon as Lachlan Drake

Episode chronology
← Previous "Chutes and Ladders"	Next → "Devil's Night"
- American Horror Story: Hotel

"Mommy" is the third episode of the fifth season of the anthology television series American Horror Story. It aired on October 21, 2015 on the cable network FX. This episode was written by James Wong and directed by Bradley Buecker.

== Plot ==
Tristan Duffy meets with James March and they talk about secret places in the Hotel. Will reviews the hotel blueprints and notes that they bear little resemblance to the reality of the building. Tristan attempts seduction as a distraction, and almost stabs Will, when he notes Countess Elizabeth watching disapprovingly.

Iris has researched where she and Donovan will move on to, but he refuses. After a heated argument, Donovan coldly tells Iris to kill herself and leaves. He comes upon Ramona Royale, who appears to have car trouble. He intends to knife her, but she tasers him in response.

Elizabeth has a rendezvous with Will and is nearly successful in seducing him, when Tristan intervenes. Elizabeth admits to Tristan that she invested badly in Bernie Madoff's pyramid scheme. Her motive was to marry Will and bleed him of money, afterwards killing him.

Alex presents John with divorce papers, who becomes distraught and apologizes for his failings as a husband and father. While leaving the hotel Alex finds a bloody Claudia in the hallway before coming across Holden who calls Alex "Mommy". Sally helps Iris to commit suicide by drugging her, before clarifying that Iris would not return to haunt the hotel. Sally awaits her demise, but is interrupted by the arrival of Donovan, who at the sight of his dying mother, slits his wrist and revives her, and Sally is amused by the twisted poetic justice.

== Reception ==
The episode was watched by 3.20 million people during its original broadcast, and gained a 1.7 ratings share among adults aged 18–49. It topped the Nielsen Social ratings for the third consecutive week, with 129,000 tweets seen by over 1.99 million people.

The episode received favorable reviews from critics, earning an 81% approval rating based on 16 reviews, with an average score of 7.6/10, on Rotten Tomatoes. The critical consensus reads: "By highlighting an especially twisted mother-son relationship in "Mommy", Hotel continues to be a thoroughly creepy stay."
