= American Horror Story: Hotel =

Fifth season of American Horror Story

- Season 5
- Promotional poster and home media cover art
- Showrunner: Ryan Murphy
- Starring: Kathy Bates; Sarah Paulson; Evan Peters; Wes Bentley; Matt Bomer; Chloë Sevigny; Denis O'Hare; Cheyenne Jackson; Angela Bassett; Lady Gaga
- No. of episodes: 12

Release
- Original network: FX
- Original release: October 7, 2015 – January 13, 2016

Season chronology
- ← Previous; Freak Show Next → Roanoke

The fifth season of the American horror anthology television series American Horror Story, subtitled Hotel, is centered around the mysterious Hotel Cortez in Los Angeles, the scene of disturbing and paranormal events, overseen by its enigmatic staff. The location is loosely based on the Cecil Hotel, marked by deaths and tragedies. The ensemble cast includes Kathy Bates, Sarah Paulson, Evan Peters, Wes Bentley, Matt Bomer, Chloë Sevigny, Denis O'Hare, Cheyenne Jackson, Angela Bassett, and Lady Gaga, with all returning from previous seasons, except newcomers Jackson and Gaga. Hotel marks the first season to not feature cast mainstays Jessica Lange and Frances Conroy. Breaking from the anthological format, the season is connected to Murder House and Coven.

Created by Ryan Murphy and Brad Falchuk for the cable network FX, the series is produced by 20th Century Fox Television. Hotel broadcast between October 7, 2015, to January 13, 2016, consisting of 12 episodes, despite initially reported to consist of 13 episodes. The season was confirmed in October 2014, with the subtitle Hotel announced in February 2015. As stated by Murphy and Falchuk, Hotel is thematically darker than previous installments and was inspired by old hotel horror films and actual hotels situated in downtown Los Angeles with a reputation for sinister events. The cycle also marks a return to filming in Los Angeles, where the first two seasons were shot. Hotel features one of the most expansive sets in American Horror Story history, with production designer Mark Worthington building two stories on a soundstage, along with a working elevator and stairway. In July 2015, FX launched a marketing campaign for the series, with most trailers and teasers touting Gaga's involvement.

Hotel garnered eight Emmy Award nominations, including two acting nominations for Paulson and Bates. However, it was the first time that a season of American Horror Story was not nominated for Outstanding Limited Series. In addition, Gaga won the Golden Globe Award for Best Actress – Mini-Series or Television Film, while Hotel received a nomination for Best Mini-Series or Television Film.

== Cast and characters ==
=== Main ===
Hotel main cast

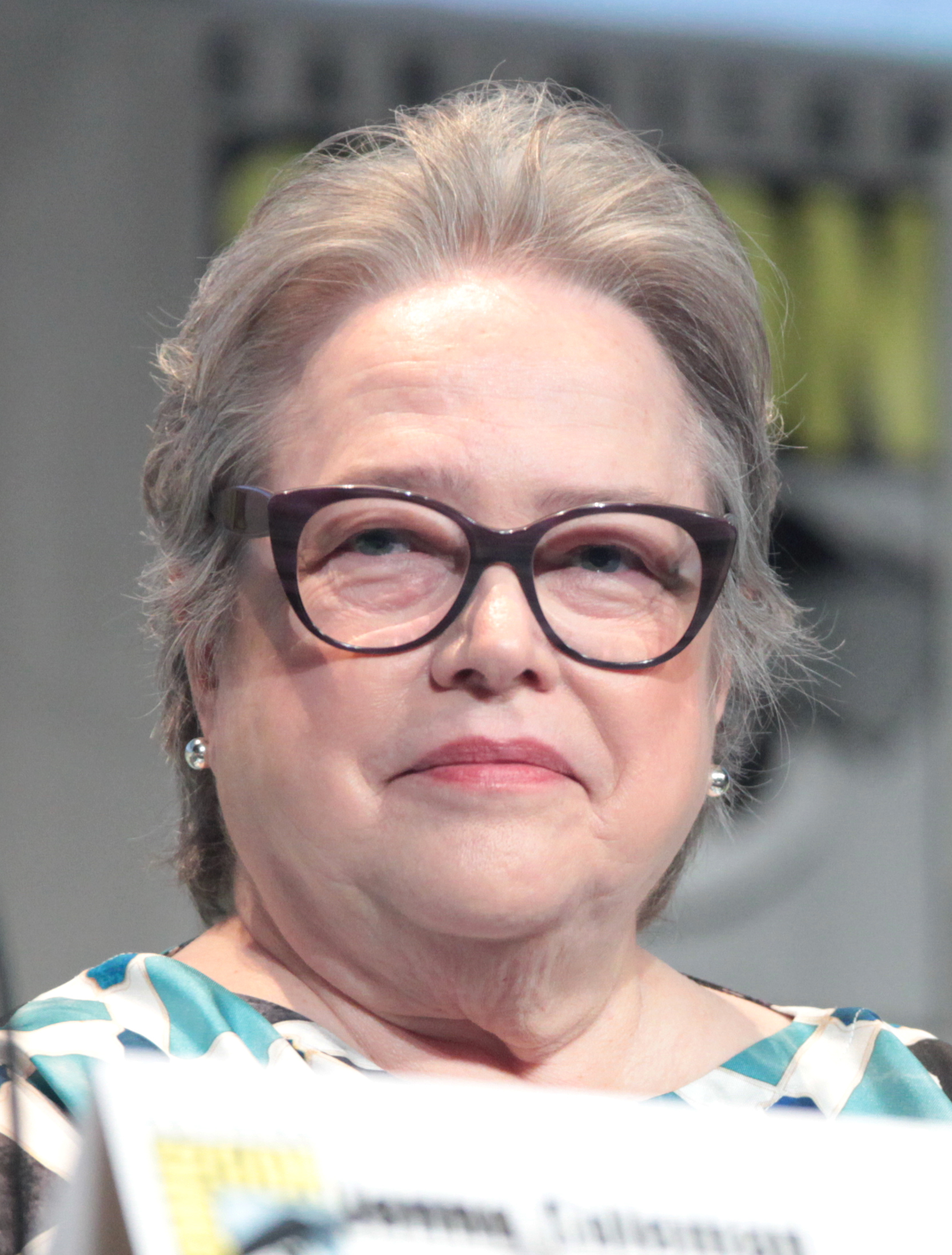
Kathy Bates

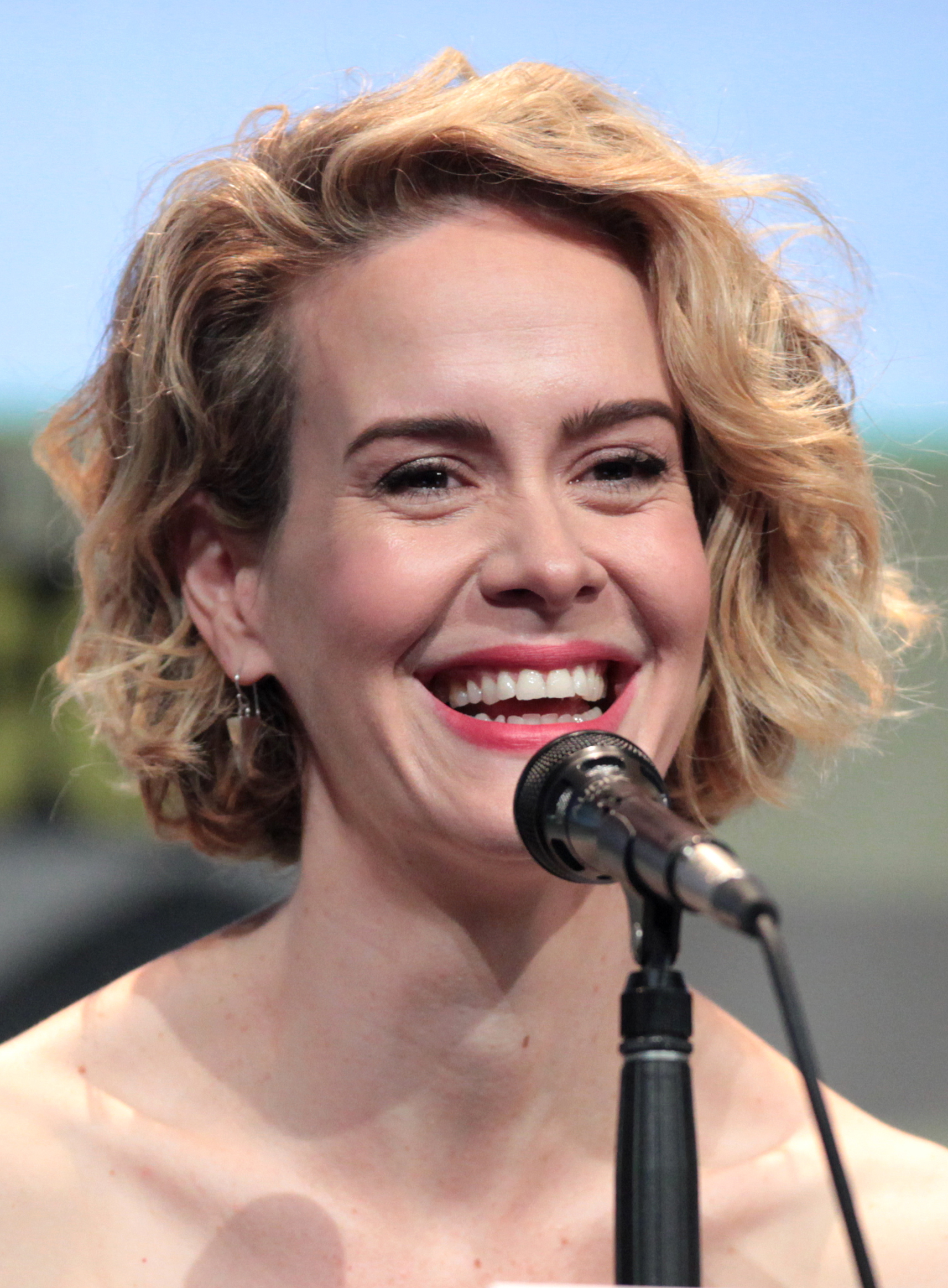
Sarah Paulson

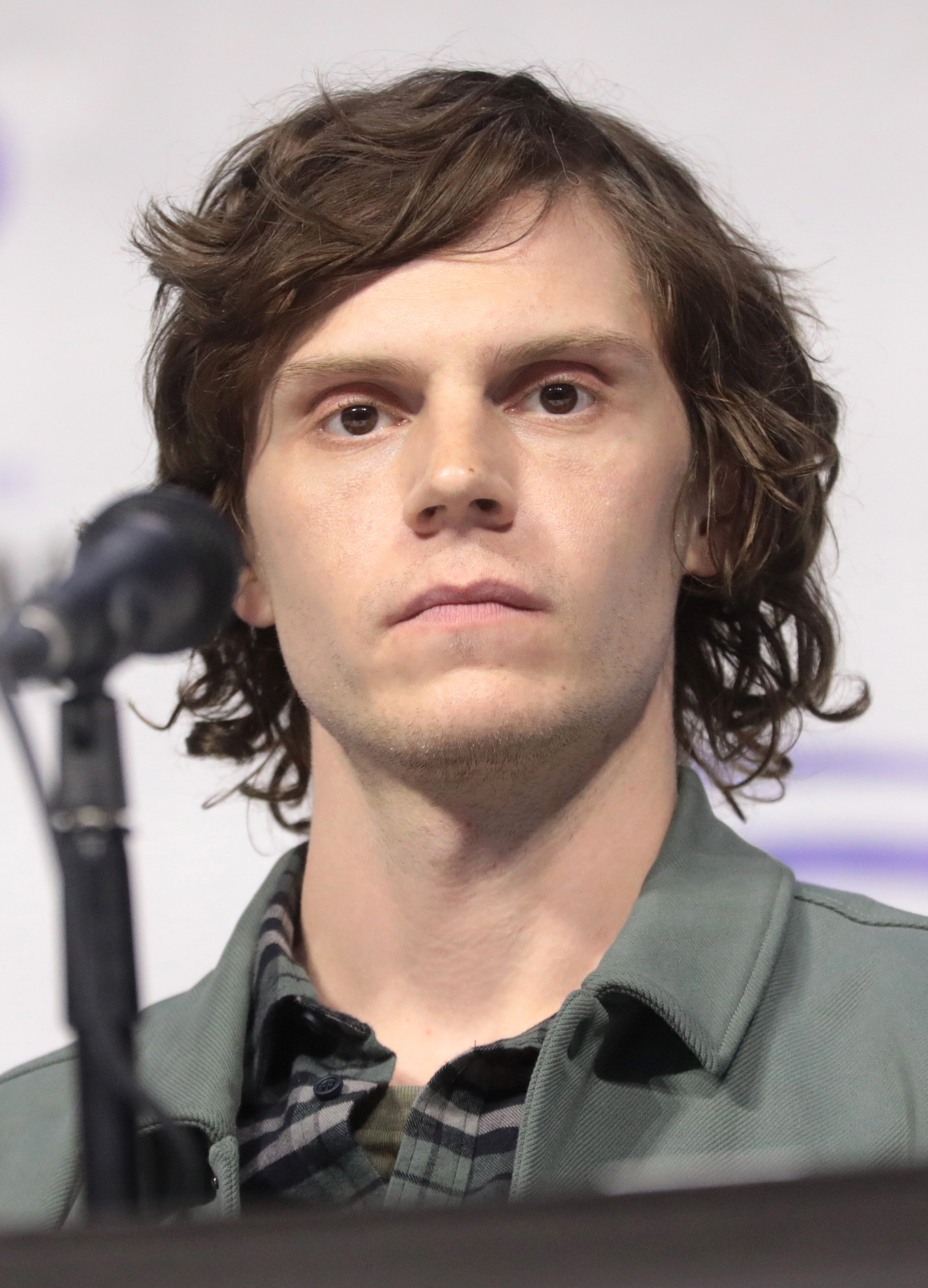
Evan Peters

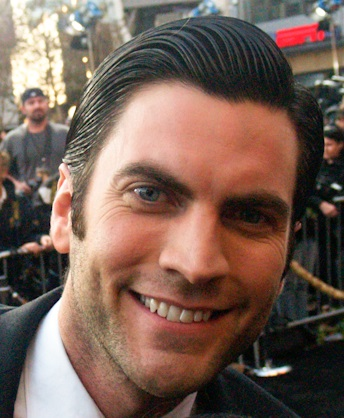
Wes Bentley

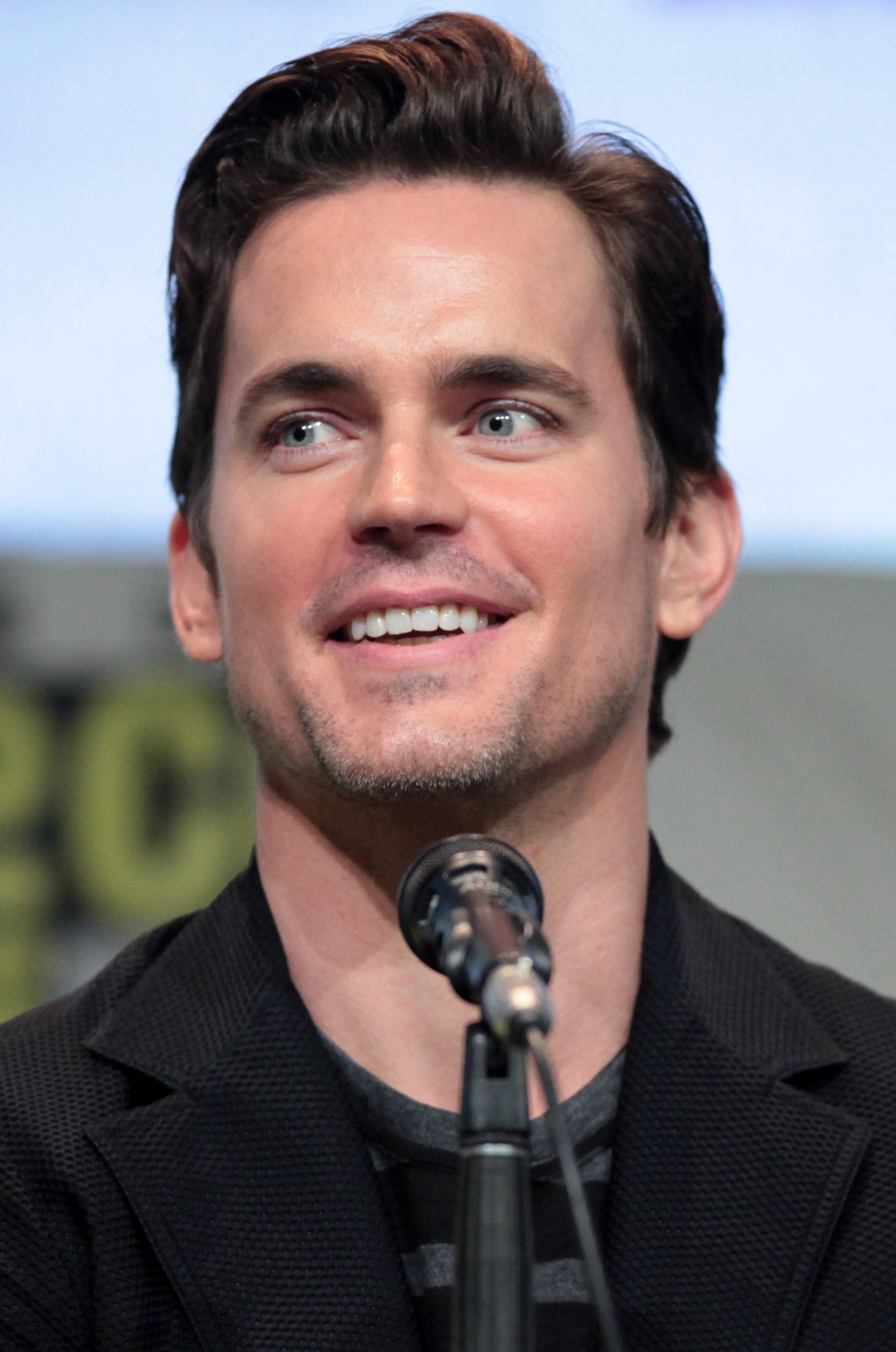
Matt Bomer

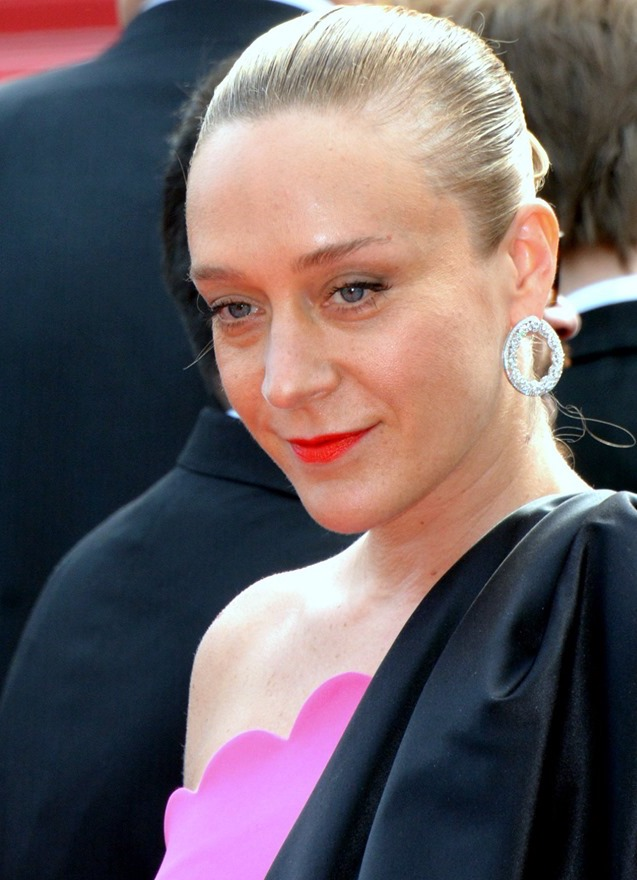
Chloë Sevigny

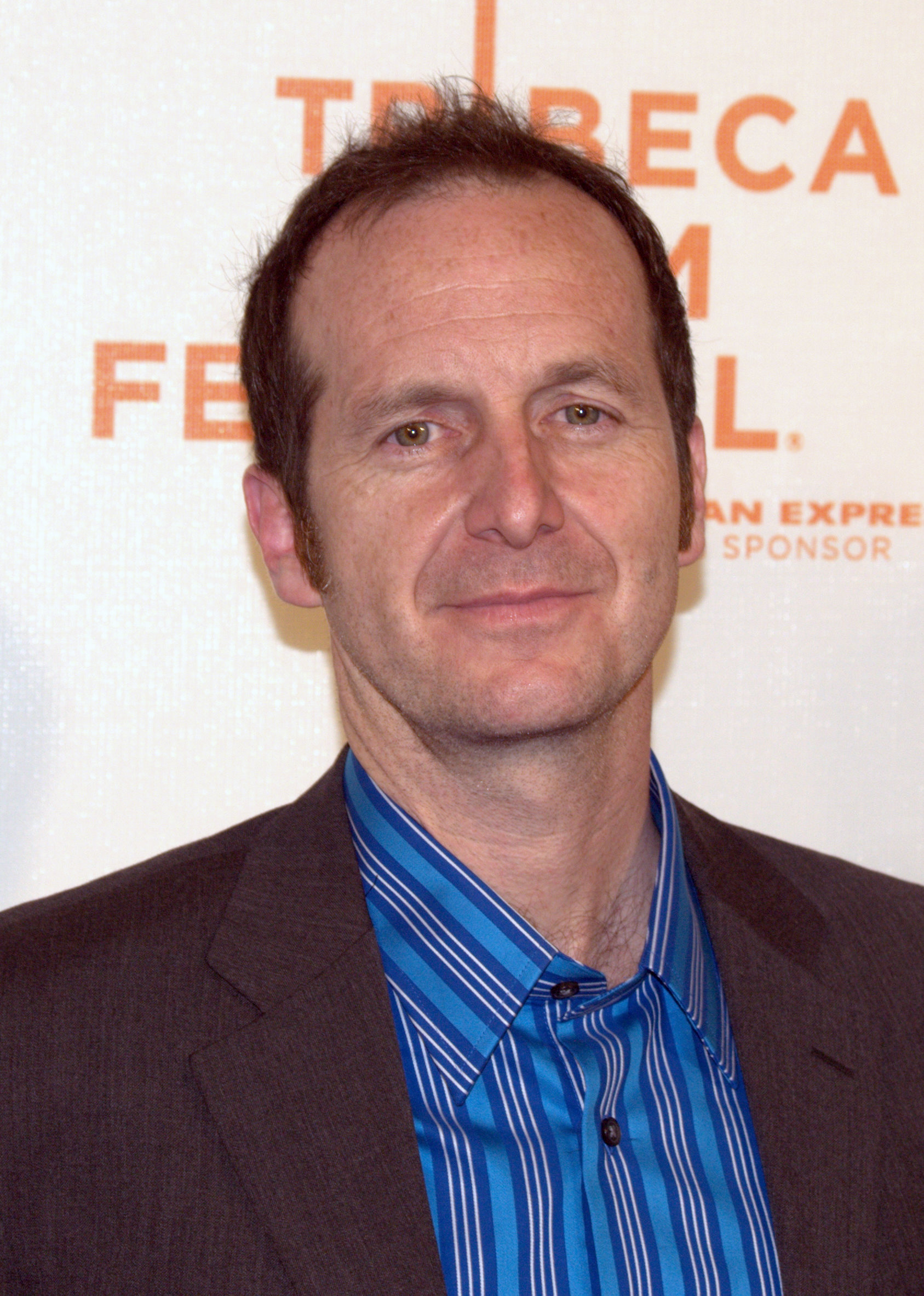
Denis O'Hare

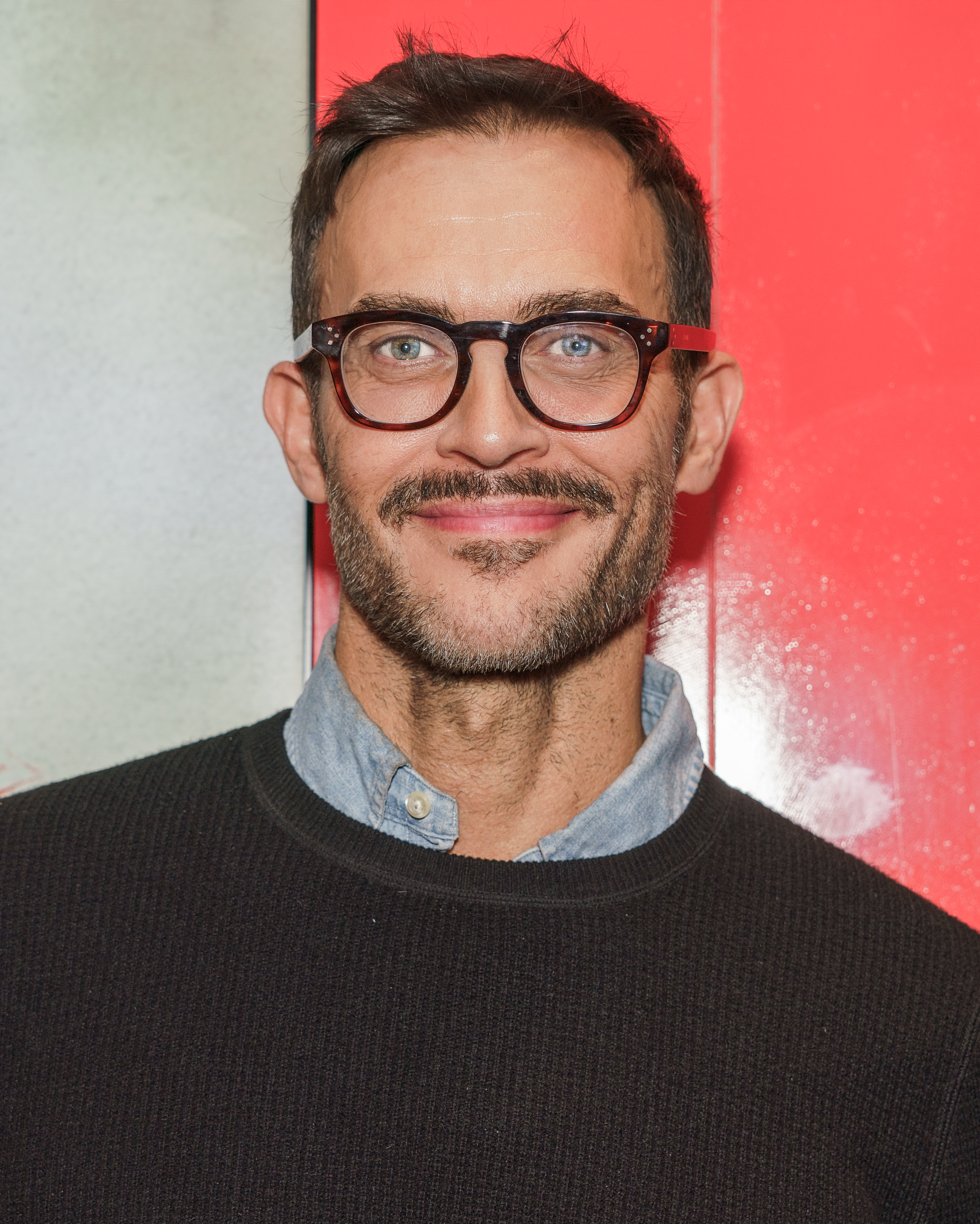
Cheyenne Jackson

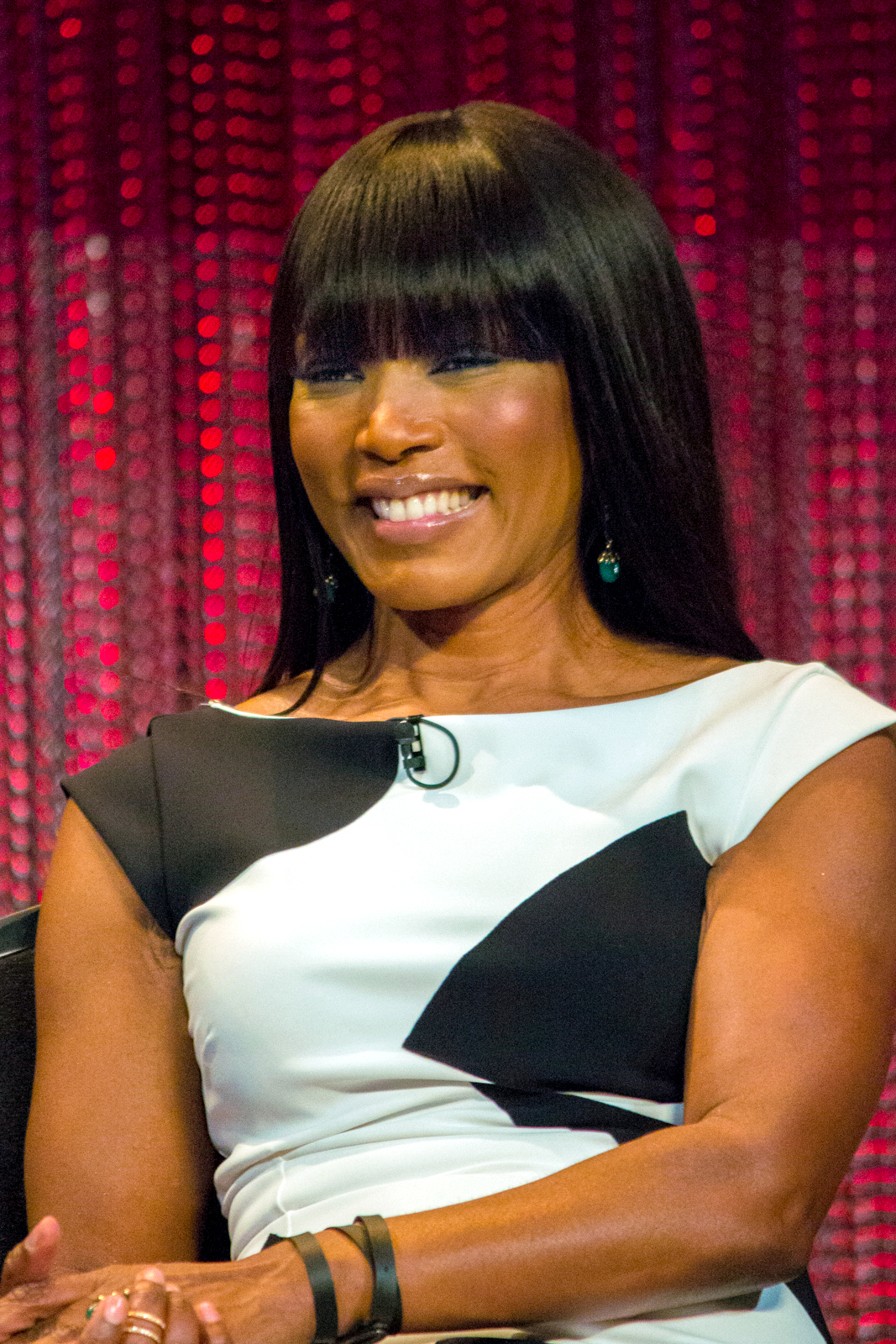
Angela Bassett

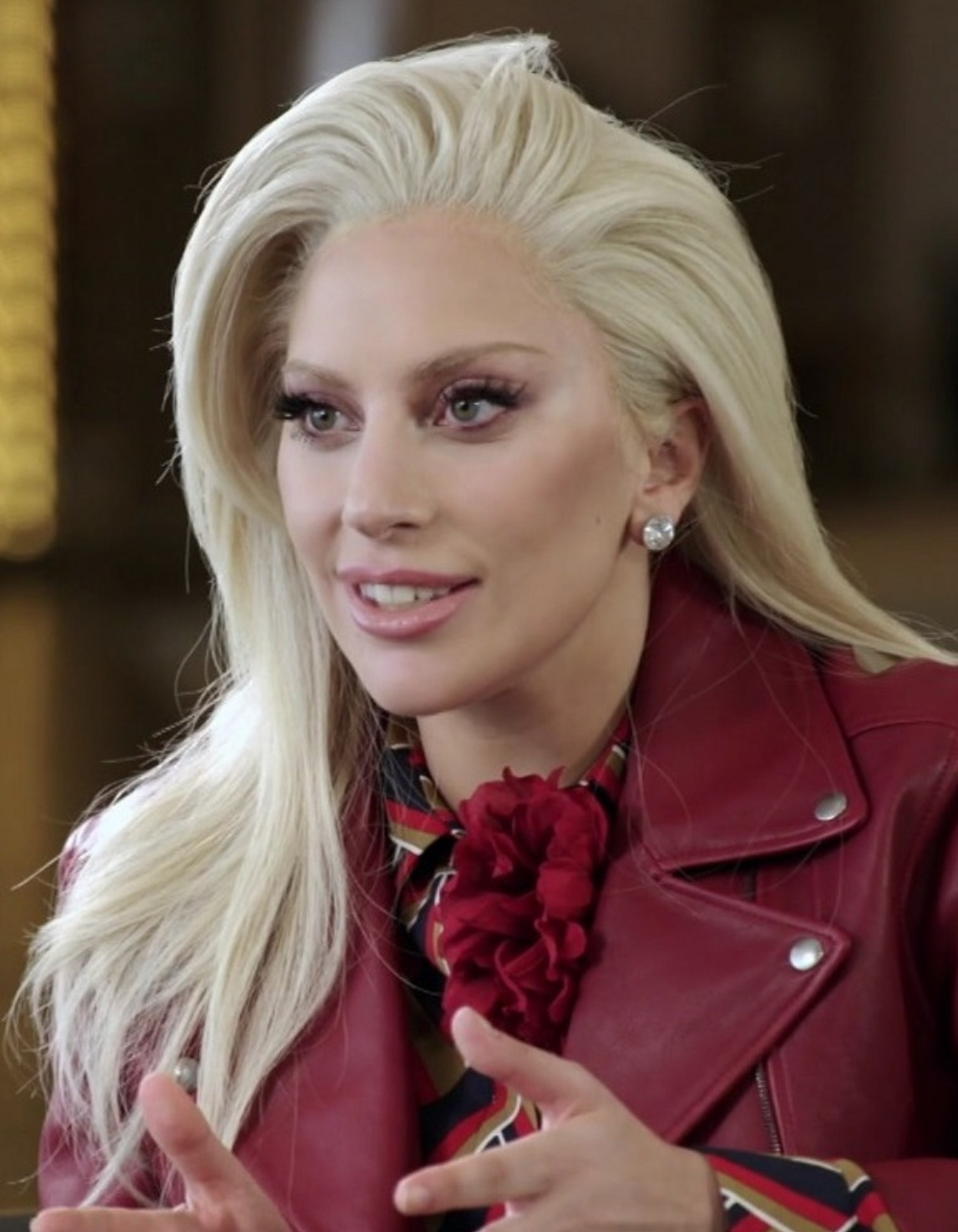
Lady Gaga

- Kathy Bates as Iris Holloway
- Sarah Paulson as
  - "Hypodermic" Sally McKenna
  - Billie Dean Howard
- Evan Peters as James Patrick March
- Wes Bentley as Det. John Lowe
- Matt Bomer as Donovan Holloway
- Chloë Sevigny as Dr. Alex Lowe
- Denis O'Hare as Liz Taylor
- Cheyenne Jackson as Will Drake
- Angela Bassett as Ramona Royale
- Lady Gaga as Elizabeth Johnson / The Countess

=== Special guest stars ===
- Finn Wittrock as
  - Tristan Duffy
  - Rudolph Valentino
- Lily Rabe as Aileen Wuornos
- Naomi Campbell as Claudia Bankson
- Gabourey Sidibe as Queenie
- Mare Winningham as Miss Hazel Evers

=== Recurring ===
- Christine Estabrook as Marcy
- Max Greenfield as Gabriel
- Lennon Henry as Holden Lowe
- Richard T. Jones as Det. Andrew Hahn
- Shree Crooks as Scarlett Lowe
- Lyric Lennon as Lachlan Drake
- Jessica Belkin as Wren
- Mädchen Amick as Mrs. Ellison
- Helena Mattsson as Agnetha
- Kamilla Alnes as Vendela
- Anton Lee Starkman as Max Ellison
- Ava Acres as Madeline
- Alexandra Daddario as Natacha Rambova

=== Guest stars ===
- Darren Criss as Justin
- John Carroll Lynch as John Wayne Gacy
- Seth Gabel as Jeffrey Dahmer
- Anthony Ruivivar as Richard Ramirez
- Nico Evers-Swindell as Craig
- Jessica Lu as Bronwyn
- Matt Ross as Dr. Charles Montgomery
- Charles Melton as Mr. Wu

== Episodes ==
No. overall	No. in season	Title	Directed by	Written by	Original release date	Prod. code	US viewers (millions)
52	1	"Checking In"	Ryan Murphy	Ryan Murphy & Brad Falchuk	October 7, 2015	5ATS01	5.81
Two female Swedish tourists check into the Hotel Cortez in downtown Los Angeles. They find a disfigured creature who was inside their room's mattress. Meanwhile, Detective John Lowe is investigating the torture-murder of a couple and goes to the Cortez for clues. He sees a vision there of his missing son Holden, who was abducted five years earlier. Heroin addict Gabriel checks in and is violently raped by the Addiction Demon. The resident couple, Countess Elizabeth and Donovan, have a foursome with a couple they met, murdering them after and savoring their blood. In a 1994 flashback, it is revealed that the hotel manager Iris shoved Hypodermic Sally out a window to her death after Sally drugged Donovan to death. Detective Lowe receives a text from his wife saying that she is in trouble. He rushes to the scene with his daughter in the car. His daughter then finds two dead men in the house. To keep his family safe, Detective Lowe moves out of his home and into Room 64. The new owner of the hotel Mr. Will Drake and his son arrive to live in the Penthouse. The Countess takes Will Drake's son to a secret room containing white-haired children and introduces him to Holden (Detective Lowe's abducted son.)
53	2	"Chutes and Ladders"	Bradley Buecker	Tim Minear	October 14, 2015	5ATS02	4.06
Will Drake, a designer and the new owner of the Cortez, hosts a fashion show in the hotel, which model and actor Tristan Duffy, a drug addict and narcissist, stars in. Tristan quits the show and gets into the elevator to leave the hotel. The elevator stops on floor 7, which is dark and appears deserted; Tristan meets Mr. March. The Countess turns Tristan into a vampire, and the two engage in a relationship. Donovan becomes jealous, resulting in The Countess ending their relationship. Iris tells John about the hotel: The sadistic James Patrick March built the hotel in 1926 as a place for him to torture and murder people. Eventually, the police find him, so he and his loyal laundress Miss Evers commit suicide. Will's son Lachlan shows John's eight-year-old daughter Scarlett a room that contains coffins for The Countess's vampire children. Scarlett recognizes her brother, Holden, in one of the coffins and later goes back and finds Holden in the secret room playing video games and takes a photo with him to prove to her parents that he is alive; Scarlett tries to tell her parents that Holden is alive, but they do not believe her, she shows them the photo, but the boy's face is blurred.
54	3	"Mommy"	Bradley Buecker	James Wong	October 21, 2015	5ATS03	3.20
Tristan meets March and promises to murder Will. The Countess stops Tristan from killing Will and reveals that she plans to marry the designer and murder him to gain his entire estate. Iris is rejected as a mother by Donovan, who convinces her to kill herself. Donovan is kidnapped by Ramona Royale (Angela Bassett), an ex-lover of The Countess. Ramona aims to kill The Countess's children in revenge for her murdering Ramona's male lover. She releases Donovan when he reveals he and The Countess broke up. Iris decides to end her life by overdosing on heroin supplied to her by Sally. Donovan bursts in and turns her by feeding her his vampire blood to save her. John's doctor wife Alex (Chloë Sevigny) gives him divorce papers at the Cortez. There, she is shocked to see Holden, who greets her.
55	4	"Devil's Night"	Loni Peristere	Jennifer Salt	October 28, 2015	5ATS04	3.04
On Devil's Night (Oct. 30), serial killer Richard Ramirez checks in and goes on a murder spree. More serial killers check in, including Aileen Wuornos, who tries to kill John. The hotel's transgender bartender Liz Taylor informs John of March's annual Devil's Night dinner, where the spirits of the most notorious American serial killers, who had checked into the hotel before their death, come together to celebrate their crimes. John is introduced to Ramirez, John Wayne Gacy, Jeffrey Dahmer, and the masked Zodiac Killer. During the dinner, he witnesses the guests murdering a man for "dessert." Alex takes Holden home, but then Holden leads her to the Countess, who explains that she took Holden away to "save him." The Countess offers Alex the opportunity to become a vampire so she can spend eternity with her son, and she agrees.
56	5	"Room Service"	Michael Goi	Ned Martel	November 4, 2015	5ATS05	2.87
Donovan and Ramona decide to get revenge on The Countess by making Iris their inside man. The newly-turned vampire Alex saves her dying kid, patient Max by turning him, not knowing the consequences. Max feeds on his parents and starts a strain of the virus at school, infecting his classmates, who then feed on the teachers. At the Cortez, John awakes in bed with Sally. She claims he practically dragged her into his room, where they had sex, but John denies doing any of it. A pair of arrogant hipsters check in and provoke Iris to the point of tears. She receives comfort from Liz Taylor, who details how she came to be at the hotel. Iris brutally murders and feeds on the hipsters in a rage, feeling better after. Alex starts working as the vampire children's new governess under the Countess's rules.
57	6	"Room 33"	Loni Peristere	John J. Gray	November 11, 2015	5ATS06	2.64
In 1926 in the Murder House (from Season One), Dr. Charles Montgomery meets with Countess Elizabeth to perform an abortion. During the process, the baby attacks Charles' nurse. He tells Elizabeth she had a boy. In the present day, it is revealed that The Countess keeps him in Room 33. John discovers Alex in the coffin and faints. Realizing he is losing his sanity, he checks out and returns home. Donovan, Ramona, and Iris plan to murder The Countess's vampire children, but Donovan backs out. He meets Agnetha and Vendela, the two Swedish tourists, who are now ghosts unable to leave the hotel, and he explains to them that they must find their purpose. Tristan and Liz fall in love but worry about the Countess's reaction. They ask her if they can be together, but The Countess kills Tristan in retaliation.
58	7	"Flicker"	Michael Goi	Crystal Liu	November 18, 2015	5ATS07	2.64
In the present day, two ghoulish figures are found in a barricaded corridor in Hotel Cortez. In 1925 Los Angeles, a young, human Countess Elizabeth gets into a relationship with actor Rudolph Valentino and his wife, Natacha. He dies suddenly, and Elizabeth heartbrokenly marries James March. Valentino later returns and explains he faked his death and is now a vampire. He changes Countess Elizabeth, but a jealous March traps Valentino and his wife in the corridor, where they have been for years: they are the ghoulish figures who were found. John Lowe checks into a mental health hospital and meets a child named Wren, who was an accomplice to The Ten Commandments Killer. He and Wren escape, and she reveals to him that the killer is at the Cortez. Wren then darts into traffic, not wanting to live forever anymore, and is run over.
59	8	"The Ten Commandments Killer"	Loni Peristere	Ryan Murphy	December 2, 2015	5ATS08	2.31
John heads to the Cortez, where Sally leads him to Room 64 and unveils a secret room that March had built. She reveals that John has been the murderer all along: he was repressing his memories of the murders but believes he is doing them to correct the injustice he sees everywhere. Through flashbacks, it is shown that John had first visited the Cortez in 2010. He met March, who decided John was the perfect protege to continue his work. To get him to fall truly into darkness and stop holding back, March had The Countess kidnap Holden. Distraught, John's first murder is Martin Gamboa, a child molester. John almost kills himself after realizing what he has done, but March saves him.
60	9	"She Wants Revenge"	Michael Uppendahl	Brad Falchuk	December 9, 2015	5ATS09	2.14
The Countess reflects on her situation and realizes she only has space for those she can feel love for. She tracks down Valentino and Natacha and reunites with them. She plans to construct the Cortez as a shelter against the modern world for her and Valentino, but only once she murders Will and inherits his fortune. Alex tracks down the kids from the school massacre and finds the bodies of their parents. She attempts to bring them back to the Cortez, but they refuse help. Donovan and Ramona enact their plan of vengeance, but just as Ramona is about to stab The Countess, Donovan betrays her and traps her in the blocked hallway. Will marries The Countess in a private ceremony, and immediately after, The Countess imprisons Will with Ramona and watches on a camera as Ramona slashes Will and drinks his blood.
61	10	"She Gets Revenge"	Bradley Buecker	James Wong	December 16, 2015	5ATS10	1.85
The Countess kills Natacha so she and Valentino can be together while Donovan kills Rudolph out of jealousy. John and Alex rekindle their relationship now that they have Holden back and find the rogue vampire children turned because of Alex saving Max. They take the children back to the hotel and trick them into being sealed in with Ramona. Sally does not like that John and Alex are back together, feeling used because she'd been there for John when Alex wasn't. Miss Evers helps Liz reconnect with her son, Douglas, whom she has not seen for 31 years, and they invite him to come to the hotel. Douglas admits he wants his father in his life, regardless if she is a woman, changing Liz's decision about committing suicide with Iris. Instead, Liz and Iris team up to take over the hotel, starting with shooting up the penthouse with Donovan and The Countess inside.
62	11	"Battle Royale"	Michael Uppendahl	Ned Martel	January 6, 2016	5ATS11	1.84
Liz and Iris shoot The Countess and Donovan, and The Countess escapes while Donovan lies dying. At his request, Iris and Liz move him outside the hotel to die so his spirit will not be trapped inside forever. Sally saves The Countess, reviving her with blood from her vampire children, and reveals a part of her past that explains why she's skilled with sewing, because she sewed herself and two other people together while on drugs and ripped herself out of it. Iris and Liz free Ramona to use as a weapon against The Countess. Ramona confronts a now-weak Countess Elizabeth but is seduced by her old lover. The Countess packs and is about to leave the hotel for good, but John guns her down as his final kill: "Thou Shalt Not Commit Murder." Now trapped in the hotel forever, The Countess's ghost arrives at March's suite, where he tells her that he can finally forgive The Countess for turning him in to the police; she reveals that she did not. Hazel admits she was the one who called the police so that she could have March to herself. March banishes Hazel from his presence, who feels oddly free now that she is not bound to him.
63	12	"Be Our Guest"	Bradley Buecker	John J. Gray	January 13, 2016	5ATS12	2.24
A year later, Liz reflects on the reinvention of the Hotel Cortez under her and Iris's new management. The two lament the problems that the murderous ghosts are leaving them with. Sally and Will don't want to stop killing the guests, but March agrees that they need to stop until the Cortez becomes a historical landmark. Liz and Iris inspire Sally and Will to release their urges through other means. Liz discovers she is terminally ill and decides to die in the Hotel to be with the other ghosts and vampires, whom she considers her family. After becoming a ghost, Liz is visited by Tristan, who stayed invisible while she was alive so that she could live her life. Psychic Billie Dean Howard begins investigating the Cortez with her TV show, making the residents worry. John takes Billie Dean to Devil's Night, where they threaten to kill her if she mentions the Cortez again. The Countess proceeds to seduce a man who looks like Donovan, finding a new lover in his image, implying she loved Donovan after all.

== Production ==
=== Development ===
==== Conception and writing ====
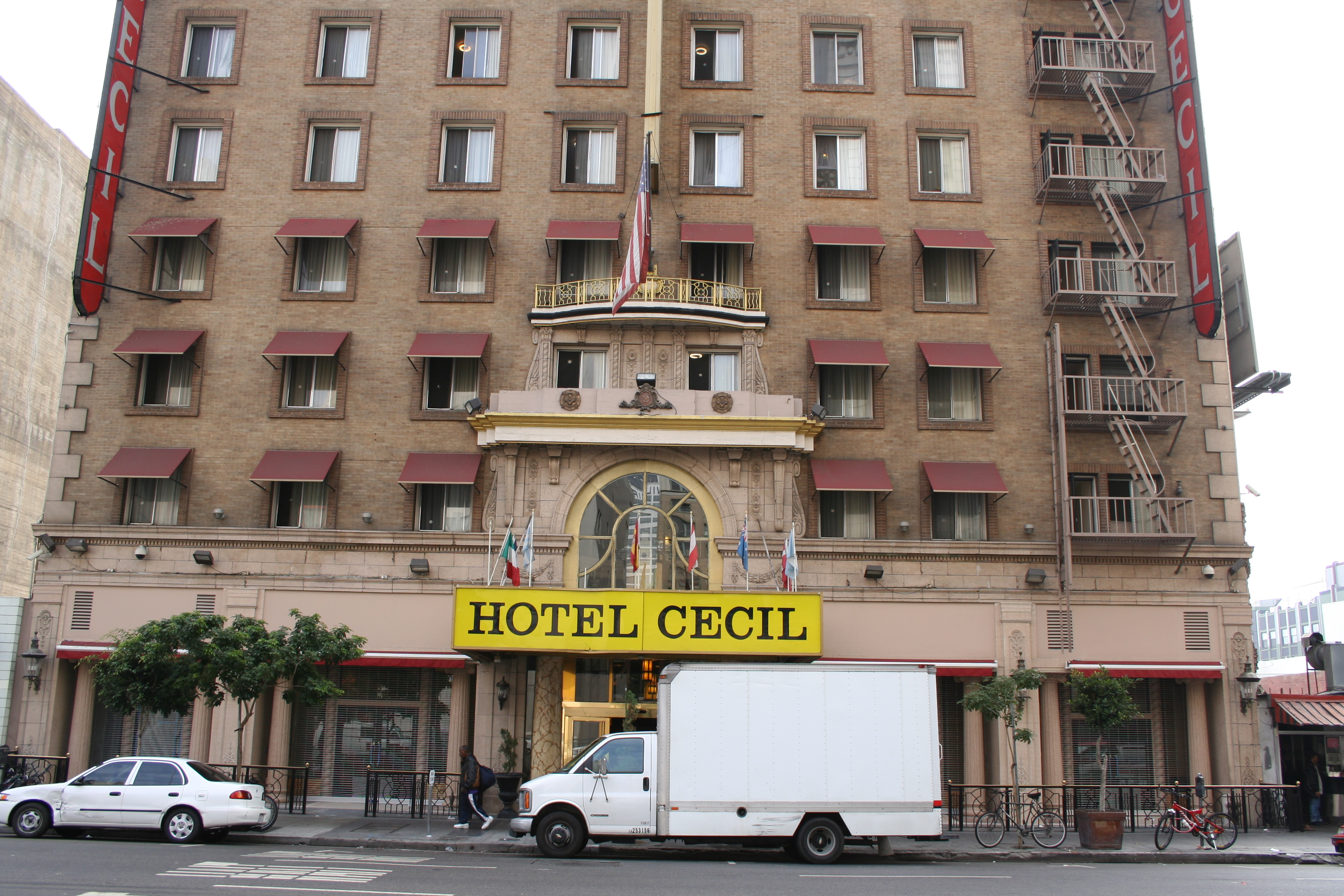
Incidents which happened at The Cecil, situated in downtown Los Angeles, were one of the inspirations behind season 5, Hotel.

On October 13, 2014, FX renewed the series for a fifth season for an October 2015 premiere. Network president John Landgraf stated that the season would necessitate a "huge reinvention" for the series. The season's subtitle was confirmed as Hotel in February 2015. The theme and Gaga's involvement were hinted in the previous installment as an image of a top hat, an arcane clue alluding to the 1935 screwball musical comedy film Top Hat, which is set in a hotel and features a song called "Cheek to Cheek", also the title of Gaga's duet album with Tony Bennett. Co-creator Ryan Murphy explained that the casting included a number of actors and singers, but would be a much darker season compared to the previous ones. Inspiration came from old hotel horror films and actual hotels situated in downtown Los Angeles, with horrific reputations. This included The Cecil, where the death of 21-year-old Canadian student Elisa Lam occurred. Murphy had watched a surveillance video of Lam in the hotel, in which she displayed erratic behavior just hours prior to her supposed death. It was around this time that the writing for Hotel was conceptualized, which included Murphy's personal phobia and fears, a fear that had not been explored since the first season.

The upcoming season that we're doing is much more horror-based; it's much more dark. It's about a theme and an idea that's very close to my heart that I've always wanted to do that's a little bloodier and grislier, I think, than anything that we've done before; it's straight horror this year. Murder House, I thought, was a very primal season because everybody's great fear is about the bogeyman under the bed in their house, and this feels similar to me in that when you check into a hotel, there are certain things beyond your control... Other people have the keys to your room; they can come in there. You're not exactly safe, it's a very unsettling idea.

Murphy and some of the cast appeared at the 2015 Comic-Con International and revealed further information about the series. "[Angela Bassett, Kathy Bates, Matt Bomer, Sarah Paulson, and Evan Peters] are bad boys and girls this time." Regarding the season having no primary character, Murphy confessed that "the thing that's different about the season is that before we've always been very driven by the Jessica Lange character. She was always the lead character... This year, it's a true ensemble, and I think we have more male parts and more male stories. The Wes Bentley part is really big; the Matt Bomer part is really big; Evan Peters and Finn Wittrock are really big. [But] that's not to say that the women aren't either."

Co-creator Brad Falchuk explained that like the first and second season of the series, Hotel would explore the "trapped" horror trope, though the actions would not be limited to just within the premises. "This season, the horror is sneaking out of the hotel," he added explaining that the plot would revolve around the hotel in the center, with a more noir like ambience. Named as Hotel Cortez, the titular structure was built by James March in 1930, who was created as a rich and charming but deeply psychotic character. The season features two tormentors, The Ten Commandments Killer, who is inspired by biblical teachings, and The Addiction Demon, who wields a drill bit dildo. They are in the vein of previous seasons' Bloody Face and Rubber Man, respectively. The Halloween episode, "Devil's Night", features a dinner with "the biggest serial killers of all time", including Wuornos and John Wayne Gacy.

==== Set design ====
The hotel's two-story lobby set, along with a working elevator, was constructed over seven weeks. While no particular hotel served as inspiration, production designer Mark Worthington was influenced by Timothy Pflueger and William Van Alen when selecting patterns and schemes, stating, "Tonally, I thought Art Deco would make sense for the horror genre because it can be dark and spiky and odd and the composition is strange. It's beautiful, but it isn't necessarily inviting." The hotel consists of complicated structures housing March's murderous fantasies with dead ends, secret rooms and includes plot lines corresponding to it. A painting of Hernán Cortés, after whom the establishment is named, hangs in the reception area. Worthington and his team had a hand in creating even the smallest details, such as hotel symbols for the light fixtures, bar coasters, and a venus flytrap column carving reflecting the nature of Gaga's character. The staircase was structured in such a way as to not pull focus from the elevator, which will serve as a prime location. The exterior of the set was inspired by the James Oviatt Building in Downtown Los Angeles, while the interior decorations were modeled from the Cicada restaurant situated inside the Oviatt.

=== Casting ===
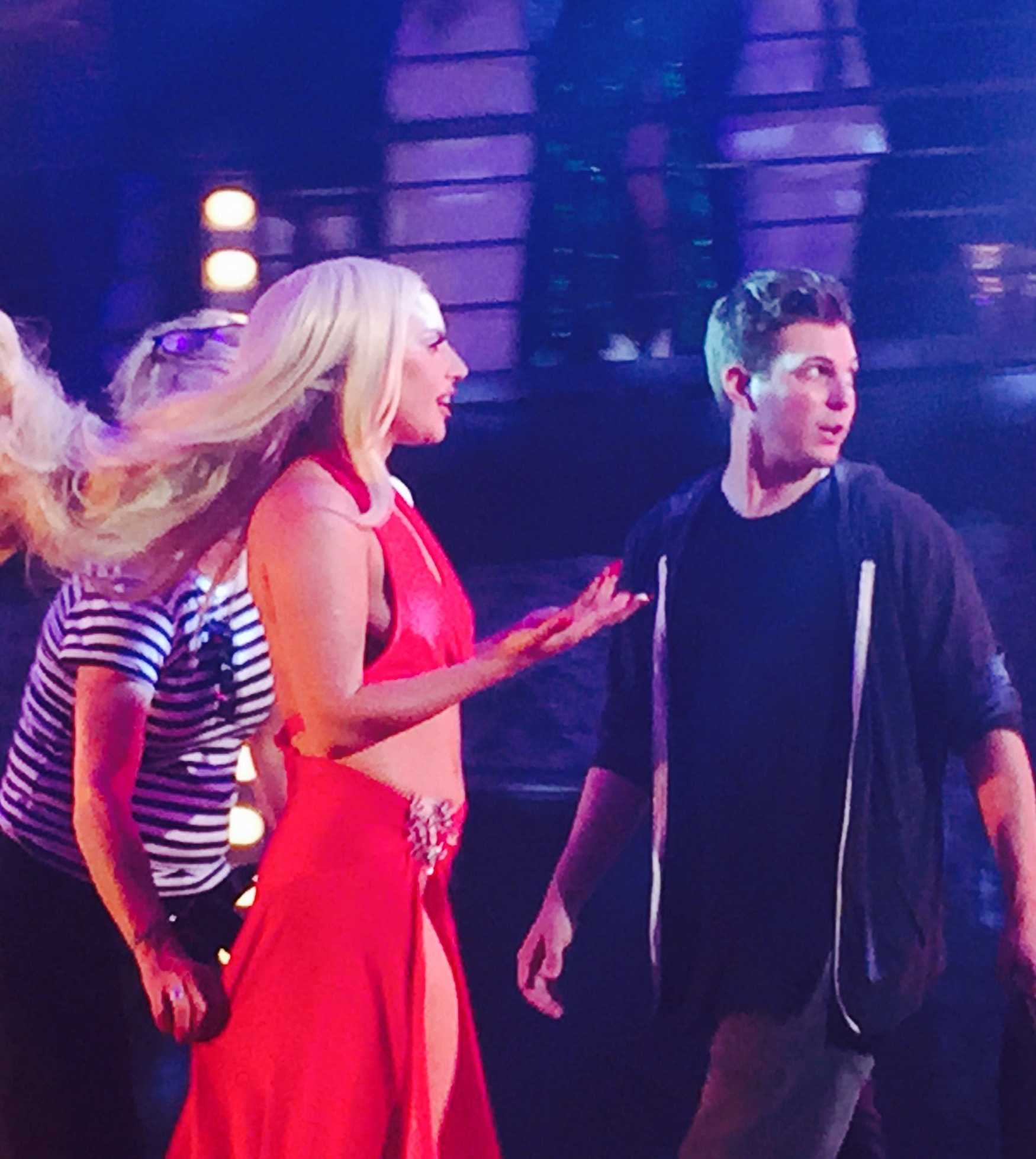
Gaga on set during filming of the series. She hosted a Hotel themed party at her residence for the cast and crew after the first week of filming.

In February 2015, it was announced that American singer Lady Gaga had joined the show. Murphy stated she wanted her role in the series to be "evil". He also explained that Hotel would be devoid of any musical numbers. Instead Gaga's character, Elizabeth/The Countess, is a fashion icon and owner of the Hotel Cortez. Created as a glamorous socialite character, The Countess maintains her beauty by imbibing human blood. Murphy was so pleased with Gaga's performance that he invited her back for the yet-to-be-confirmed sixth season of the series, before Hotel had even made its debut. In March 2015, series star Jessica Lange definitively announced that she would not be returning for the fifth season. During PaleyFest 2015, it was announced that Matt Bomer and Cheyenne Jackson would co-star. Afterwards, more castings were confirmed, including Sarah Paulson, Evan Peters, Kathy Bates, and Angela Bassett. Murphy tweeted about the latter's involvement in Hotel, including a plotline with Gaga, as a character called Ramona Royale, an actress and former lover of The Countess returning to the titular hotel for revenge. Chloë Sevigny, who was a recurring special guest in Asylum, returned to the series for Hotel, playing the wife of Wes Bentley's character, a detective.

In May 2015, it was announced that Max Greenfield would also be joining the cast, in a role later revealed to be that of an addict. Greenfield had to dye his hair platinum blond for the role. His is intertwined to that of Sally's (Paulson) and together with The Addiction Demon feature "the most disturbing scene" the show had ever produced, according to Murphy. In an interview with Vanity Fair, Paulson described Sally as someone who is "selfish and greedy", with hygiene problems. The next month, Murphy announced that Denis O'Hare would return as a transgender hotel bartender. He also confirmed that Finn Wittrock would return in the new role of Tristan Duffy, a male model who is involved in a love triangle with Gaga and Bomer, and later a fated love of Liz's. Wittrock explained that the character might have similarities to his previous Freak Show character, Dandy Mott. In July 2015, Murphy stated that Emma Roberts would be returning to the series for a few episodes toward the finale, after completing filming on her Fox series, Scream Queens. Her character would be associated with James March (Peters). While promoting Scream Queens in September 2015, Roberts spoke about her role with less certainty, but optimism, stating, "...it's just everything you could dream of and more. Everything you could nightmare about and more. Granted, things over there are always changing, but I definitely want to go back to it. If it still stands, what Ryan told me, everyone's in for a great shock." However, she later confirmed that she would be unable to return, due to her demanding feature schedule. Furthermore, she did state that Murphy and her had already discussed about a "devilish" role for her in the next season, Roanoke. Despite this, she did not appear in the sixth.

Later in July, Richard T. Jones joined the cast as Detective Hahn, a homicide detective, for an eight-episode arc. That same day, Helena Mattsson announced that she had also joined the series in an unspecified role. Series alum Lily Rabe portrayed infamous serial killer Aileen Wuornos during the Halloween installment and the finale. Naomi Campbell was cast as a fashion editor who does not get along with Gaga's character. In August 2015, Murphy revealed that Mädchen Amick joined the season as a "mother of a boy who becomes ill", and shares screen time with Alex Lowe (Sevigny). Later in the month, Darren Criss was announced to guest star as a hipster that has conflicts with Iris (Bates), while Mare Winningham joined as the laundress of the Cortez, who works closely with Mr. March, in the 1920s. Christine Estabrook returned to the series as Marcy; the realtor who sold the first season's Murder House to the Harmons. Gabourey Sidibe appeared in the eleventh episode as her Coven persona Queenie. Paulson also reprised her first season role of psychic Billie Dean Howard, appearing in the final episode of the season.

=== Filming ===
Principal photography for the season began on July 14, 2015, in Los Angeles, California, marking a return to where the series shot its first two cycles (Murder House and Asylum). According to the Los Angeles Times, creative reasons, not economic factors, was the deciding key for moving the series from Louisiana back to Los Angeles since Hotel's story is connected to the city. Murphy revealed a six-story hotel set was being built on the Fox lot. A dummy set of the hotel was built at Comic-Con, showing an Art Deco style building from the 1920s, inspired by the old Hollywood era. Murphy announced at the TCA Summer Press Tour in August 2015 that he would be directing the season's Halloween episode, "Devil's Night", marking the first time in series history that he will helm more than the premiere. He stated he would direct it "because I love the script so much, when we finished it I said, 'I can't give this to anybody else'." However, ultimately Murphy did not direct the episode. In an interview with Entertainment Tonight, Murphy spoke about Gaga's entrance scene, confirming it to be about six minutes long and describing it as "like a silent movie with no dialogue, and lots of blood and nudity".

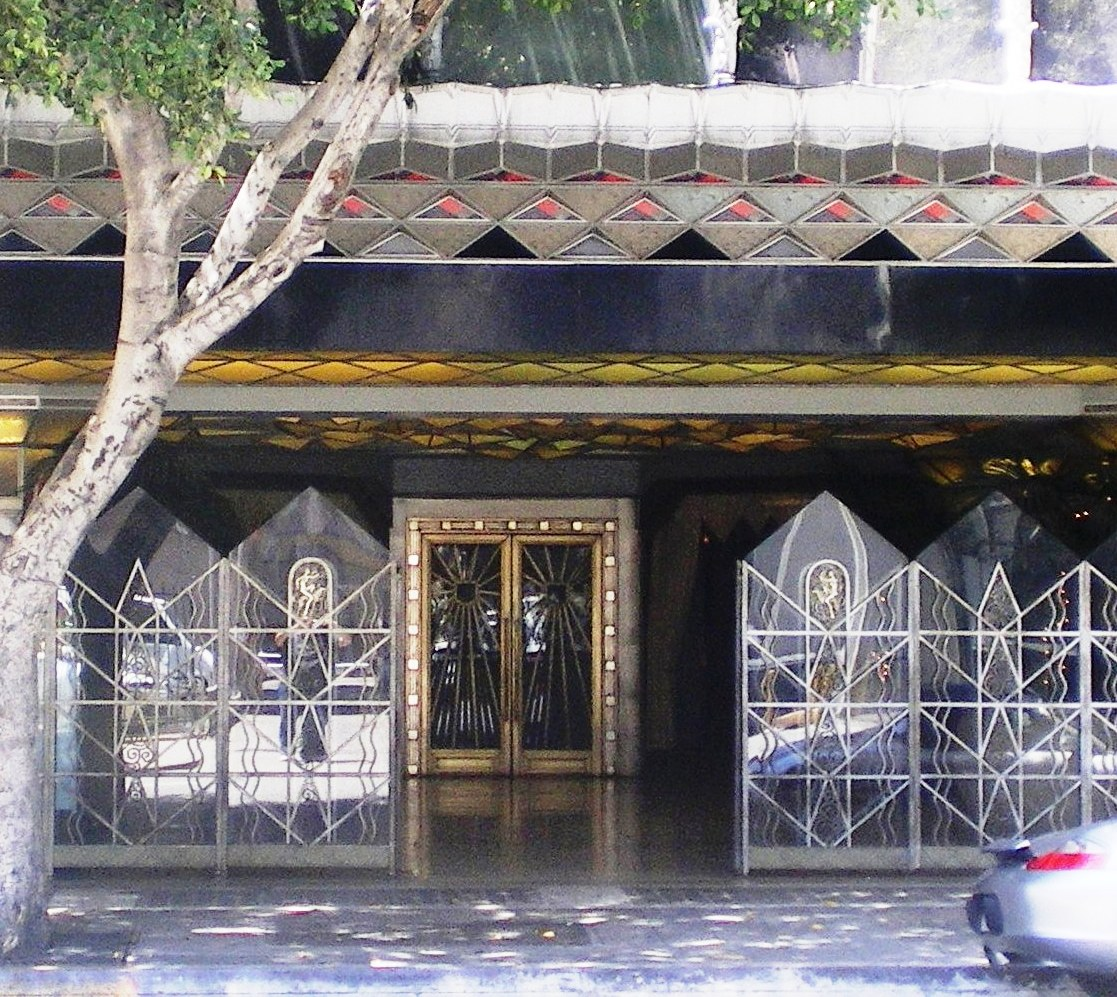
Exterior shots were filmed at the James Oviatt Building

Greenfield recalled that Murphy wanted to push the limits of the scenes between him, Paulson, and The Addiction Demon while admitting that it was scary. Paulson described it as a normal day of shooting for her since she was accustomed to the show's theatrics. She added, "None of it's crazy to me. I walk in, and I'm like, 'Hello, conical dildo demon person.' I don't even think twice." For The Countess and Donovan, who both suffer from blood lust, Murphy insisted on chainmail gloves being used as their weapons of choice. Costume designer Lou Eyrich created the custom gloves in the mold of armor, deriving inspiration from artist Daphne Guinness; "We wanted it to look both rock-n-roll but old at the same time. But then the nail that pops out with diamonds on the edge to slice you," said Eyrich.

Filming also took place at the Los Angeles County Museum of Art, in front of Chris Burden's art installation called Urban Light, where Gaga was seen in a floor length pink gown shooting scenes. Media reported that the filming involved a party scene with Gaga walking through the installation while singer Dinah Washington's "Coquette" played in the background. Entertainment Weekly's Tim Stack spent three days on set, where he witnessed the filming of a foursome/murder scene, involving Gaga and Bomer's characters. Murphy recounted Gaga's day of filming stating, "You write a foursome for her and you expect a lot of questions. She never did that. She showed up and she was wearing diamond pasties, a Band-Aid on her hoo-ha, heels, and a black veil that Alexander McQueen made for her on the day before his death." Additional filming for the exterior shots of the Hotel Cortez took place outside the James Oviatt Building. Other locations include the lower level of the Los Angeles Theatre at 615 South Broadway, The Majestic Downtown at 650 South Spring Street acting as John Lowe's office, the Loews Hollywood Hotel at 1755 Highland Avenue filming The Ten Commandments Killer murder scene, and Hollywood Forever Cemetery, where scenes with Gaga and Bomer were shot. Also used was the house from the first season located at 1120 Westchester Place.

O'Hare revealed that he had filmed three episodes by September 2015, with his scenes involving Bomer, Sevigny and Bates mostly. "We're kind of doing it piecemeal. You'll do five days on this one, three days on that one. You know, they always start out rocking. There's no warm-up. You're in it," the actor explained. He later went on to compare the aesthetic to Murder House, stating, "It feels like season 1 in many ways... and I think it's because we're back in LA. You can't help it!" He also revealed that his character, Liz Taylor, would be wearing a dress that Lange was supposed to wear in Coven. The actor explained that for his part, he had to shave his body including his head, and wear eye make-up, since the character was inspired by actress Elizabeth Taylor's films like BUtterfield 8 (1960) and Cleopatra (1963).

== Release ==
=== Marketing ===
In February 2015, Gaga tweeted a link to the first promotional video for the upcoming season with the caption "Make your reservation now. #GagaAHSHotel" announcing her presence in the season and the official title. In July 2015, a promotional trading card was unveiled by Entertainment Weekly, available at Comic-Con, where after entering the hotel set built there, one could receive the trading card with a promotional key. The first official teaser for the season was released later that month, showing Gaga's long-nailed hand ringing the bell at the front desk. In August 2015, FX revealed the premiere date of the season along with a new teaser poster, showing an Art Deco peephole on a wooden door, beyond which an obscure image revealed a blond woman putting a body to bed. Later that month, Entertainment Weekly exclusively unveiled two teaser trailers of the season, entitled "Beauty Rest" and "Do Not Disturb", set to singer Heidi Feek's cover of Elvis Presley's 1956 single, "Heartbreak Hotel".

On August 26, Entertainment Weekly revealed exclusive cast photos, along with character descriptions. Gaga also took to her Twitter account to release another photo, showing her as The Countess with three cherubic blond boys, who are seemingly sucking on bottles of blood. The singer captioned the image: "We are family. Meet my magical children. HOTEL #AHS." Murphy released three new teasers through his Twitter account, titled "Towhead", "Sleepwalk", and "Jeepers Peepers", all set to "Heartbreak Hotel". Jef Rouner from Houston Press complimented the teasers, describing them as "things of fleeting, awful beauty. So far I've seen six for this season and at least one of them is creepier than every episode of Coven combined... Each one of these is usually less than 15 seconds long and they are murderously effective. I find myself wanting to watch the show again." On September 10, 2015, an extended teaser was released, featuring a psychedelic tour of the hotel, with cameos by most of the cast. Few days later, two more trailers were released, one showed the hand of an addict, with a keyhole in place of the needle point, while the other, titled "Above & Below", portrays Gaga as The Countess, with several psychedelic intercuts inside a hotel, featuring Rammstein's "Du hast".

American retail chain Hot Topic announced on their Instagram account that starting September 28, 2015, they will launch a clothing and apparel line based on Hotel, that will be sold in-store and online. On September 16, 2015, a featurette was released, giving more details about the season and showing some footage. An actual scene from the season, released in October 2015, showed Bentley's character resting in the hotel, while Greenfield's character hiding underneath his bed. Same day the title sequence of the season was released by Murphy, consisting of the same soundtrack like previous seasons, intercut with scenes of a dirty hotel and the Ten Commandments written across a wall. Jacob Bryant from Variety was impressed with the clip, saying that "The opening credits for [American Horror Story] have always managed to be unsettling, but season five's creepy credits might top the list."

=== Home media ===
American Horror Story: Hotel – The Complete Fifth Season
Set Details		Special Features
12 Episodes; 4 Disc Set (DVD); 3 Disc Set (BD); English & Spanish 5.1 Dolby Digital, French 2.0 Surround; Subtitles: English SDH, Spanish, French; Runtime: 618 Minutes		An Invitation to Devil's Night: A Look at the Making of the episode "Devil's Night"; The Cortez An Era of Elegance Gone By: An Inside Look on the "Hotel Cortez" set with interviews from the cast and crew
Release Dates
Region 1	Region 2	Region 4
October 4, 2016	October 3, 2016	October 11, 2016

== Reception ==
=== Critical response ===
American Horror Story: Hotel initially received more mixed reviews from critics in comparison to its predecessors. The review aggregation website Rotten Tomatoes gave the season a 64% approval rating (average episode score of 75%) with an average rating of 6.35/10 based on 215 reviews. The site's consensus reads, "Favoring garish style over effective storytelling, the fifth American Horror Story strands a talented cast at Ryan Murphy's Hotel." On Metacritic, the season was given a score of 60 out of 100 based on 24 reviews, indicating "mixed or average" reviews.

Dan Fienberg of The Hollywood Reporter gave a positive review, writing, "Early on, Hotel hasn't hooked me with its storytelling, but it's always fun to see what the series does with its repertory acting company and with new additions. Throw in the normal grotesquerie and visual panache, and that should keep me going for a while, even if all of the humor appears to have been funneled into Scream Queens." Amber Dowling of TheWrap also gave a positive review, saying, "It's a visual, visceral romp into what is being set up to be another haphazard foray into the world of horror, as imagined by Murphy and his writing counterpart Brad Falchuk. The show has rarely made sense in terms of story, and this is no exception." Willa Paskin of Slate called this season a "promising new start", saying, "AHS: Hotel more obviously resembles the first two, better seasons of American Horror Story than it does the latter, lesser two."

On the other hand, Matt Zoller Seitz of New York Magazine found the season "confusing, tedious, annoyingly precious, and often ostentatiously brutal", but also praised it for being "darkly beautiful, deeply weird, and (sometimes) exhilarating." Although Scott D. Pierce from The Salt Lake Tribune praised the production design and the cinematography, he said "the storytelling is derivative; the scares are non-existent; and it's all about style without much substance." Mike Hale from The New York Times complained that it "suffers from the absence of Jessica Lange". IGN's Matt Fowler gave a rating of 5.9 out of 10, criticizing the season as "mediocre" and concluding "all weight and meaning is gone".

Gaga's performance has received mixed reviews from critics. Matt Zoller Seitz of Vulture called Gaga "terrible here in the way that Madonna was terrible in a lot of her '90s films, at once too poised and too blank." David Weiland of San Francisco Chronicle said Gaga "makes an enormous visual impact, but the minute she opens her mouth to deliver a line, it's obvious that acting just isn't one of her many talents." Ben Travers of Indiewire wrote that he "wouldn't go so far as to say Gaga's talent adds much to the proceedings, but her presence — and the manner in which its captured — certainly does." On the other hand, Emily L. Stephens from The A.V. Club and Jeff Jensen of Entertainment Weekly both gave a B− rating. Stephens praised Gaga's first appearance as "slickly exploitative and hellishly effective" while Jensen described her as "the show's most potent symbol for all of its themes about our Bad Romance with fame, fortune, sex, sex, and more sex, materialism and consumerism, the denial of death and the corrupt want for cultural immortality". Brian Lowry of Variety praised the look of Gaga's character as "gloriously photographed" and felt her addition to the show was "extraordinarily well-timed".

American Horror Story season 5: Critical reception by episode
Season 5 (2015–2016): Percentage of positive critics' reviews tracked by the website Rotten Tomatoes

=== Ratings ===
Hotel's premiere episode, "Checking In", was initially watched by 5.81 million viewers. After factoring in delayed viewing, the episode rose to 9.1 million, with 6.13 million in the 18-49 demographic, while combined linear, nonlinear and encore viewing, it drew 12.17 million viewers through October 11. Variety stated that "Checking In" could become FX's most-watched telecast, with the 60 full data tabulated. Through its first four episodes, Hotel averaged at 3.7 rating in 18-49 adult zone and 6.9 million viewers total, which is up by 7% and 1% from previous installment, Freak Show, respectively, pacing ahead of the average ratings of all prior installments on a Live +3 basis. The season finale, "Be Our Guest", initially watched by 2.24 million viewers, more than doubled its 18-49 rating with three days of delayed viewing, going from 1.1 million to 2.3 million, a 109% increase. The episode increased 94% in total viewers, upping to 4.3 million.

American Horror Story: Hotel : U.S. viewers per episode (millions)
Audience measurement performed by Nielsen Media Research

Nielsen Media Research, which records streaming viewership on certain U.S. television screens, reported that American Horror Story: Hotel garnered 718 million minutes of watch time, averaging 59.8 million minutes viewed per episode, between May 1, 2024, and August 31, 2026.

== Accolades ==
In its fifth season, the series has been nominated for 64 awards, 20 of which were won.

Year	Association	Category	Nominee(s)	Result
2015	MTV Fandom Awards	Feels Freakout of the Year	Lady Gaga joins American Horror Story: Hotel	Nominated
2016	20th ADG Awards	TV movie or Limited Series	Mark Worthington (for "Checking In")	Won
2016	20th ADG Awards	Short Format — Web Series, Music Video or Commercial	Zach Mathews (for "Hallways")	Nominated
2016	47th NAACP Image Awards	Outstanding Actress in a TV Movie, Mini-Series or Dramatic Special	Angela Bassett	Nominated
2016	42nd People's Choice Awards	Favorite Cable Sci-Fi/Fantasy TV Show	American Horror Story: Hotel	Nominated
2016	42nd People's Choice Awards	Favorite Sci-Fi/Fantasy TV Actress	Lady Gaga	Nominated
2016	20th Satellite Awards	Best Actress – TV Series Drama	Lady Gaga	Nominated
2016	20th Satellite Awards	Best TV Series – Genre	American Horror Story: Hotel	Nominated
2016	68th WGA Awards	Long Form – Original	Brad Falchuk, John J. Gray, Todd Kubrak, Crystal Liu, Ned Martel, Tim Minear, Ryan Murphy, Jennifer Salt, James Wong	Nominated
2016	73rd Golden Globe Awards	Best Actress – Mini-Series or TV Film	Lady Gaga	Won
2016	73rd Golden Globe Awards	Best Mini-Series or TV Film	American Horror Story: Hotel	Nominated
2016	6th Critics' Choice TV Awards	Best Actor in a Movie or Limited Series	Wes Bentley	Nominated
2016	6th Critics' Choice TV Awards	Best Actress in a Movie or Limited Series	Kathy Bates	Nominated
2016	6th Critics' Choice TV Awards	Best Supporting Actress in a Movie or Limited Series	Sarah Paulson	Nominated
2016	27th PGA Awards	Outstanding Producer of Long-Form TV	Brad Falchuk, Ryan Murphy, Brad Buecker, Tim Minear, Jennifer Salt, James Wong, Alexis Martin Woodall, Robert M. Williams Jr.	Nominated
2016	18th CDG Awards	Outstanding Contemporary TV Series	Lou Eyrich	Won
2016	52nd CAS Awards	TV movie or Mini-Series	Brendan Beebe, CAS (Production Mixer); Joe Earle, CAS (Re-recording Mixer); Vicki Lemar (Re-recording Mixer) (for "Room Service")	Nominated
2016	52nd CAS Awards	TV movie or Mini-Series	Brendan Beebe, CAS (Production Mixer); Joe Earle, CAS (Re-recording Mixer); Doug Andham, CAS (Re-recording Mixer); Judah Getz (ADR Mixer); John Guentner (Foley Mixer) (for "Checking In")	Nominated
2016	Make-Up Artists & Hair Stylists Guild Awards 2016	Mini-Series or TV Movie Period and/or Character Make-up	Eryn Krueger Mekash, Kim Ayers, Sarah Tanno	Won
2016	Make-Up Artists & Hair Stylists Guild Awards 2016	Mini-Series or TV Movie Period and/or Character Hair Styling	Monte C Haught, Darlene Brumfield, Frederic Asperas	Won
2016	Make-Up Artists & Hair Stylists Guild Awards 2016	Mini-Series or TV Movie Period Special Make-up Effects	Eryn Krueger Mekash, Michael Mekash, David Anderson	Won
2016	Make-Up Artists & Hair Stylists Guild Awards 2016	Commercials and Music Videos – Best Make-up	Kerry Herta, Jason Collins	Won
2016	Make-Up Artists & Hair Stylists Guild Awards 2016	Commercials and Music Videos – Best Hair Styling	Nicole Alkire, Marissa Smith	Won
2016	Fangoria Chainsaw Awards 2016	Best TV Actress	Lady Gaga	Nominated
2016	Fangoria Chainsaw Awards 2016	Best TV Supporting Actor	Evan Peters	2nd place
2016	Fangoria Chainsaw Awards 2016	Best TV Supporting Actor	Denis O'Hare	Write-in
2016	Fangoria Chainsaw Awards 2016	Best TV Supporting Actress	Kathy Bates	Write-in
2016	Fangoria Chainsaw Awards 2016	Best TV Makeup/Creature FX	Eryn Krueger Mekash, David LeRoy Anderson	3rd place
2016	Fangoria Chainsaw Awards 2016	Best TV Series	American Horror Story: Hotel	Write-in
2016	7th Dorian Awards	Campy TV Show of the Year	American Horror Story: Hotel	Nominated
2016	42nd Saturn Awards	Best Horror TV Series	American Horror Story: Hotel	Nominated
2016	68th Primetime Emmy Awards	Outstanding Supporting Actress in a Limited Series or Movie	Sarah Paulson	Nominated
2016	68th Primetime Emmy Awards	Outstanding Supporting Actress in a Limited Series or Movie	Kathy Bates	Nominated
2016	68th Primetime Creative Arts Emmy Awards	Outstanding Production Design for a Narrative Contemporary or Fantasy Program (One Hour or More)	Mark Worthington, Denise Hudson, Ellen Brill	Nominated
2016	68th Primetime Creative Arts Emmy Awards	Outstanding Contemporary Costumes	Lou Eyrich, Helen Huang, Marisa Aboitiz (for "Chutes and Ladders")	Won
2016	68th Primetime Creative Arts Emmy Awards	Outstanding Hairstyling for a Limited Series or Movie	Monte C. Haught, Fredric Aspiras, Darlene Brumfield, Kelly Muldoon, Gina Bonacquisti	Nominated
2016	68th Primetime Creative Arts Emmy Awards	Outstanding Sound Editing for a Limited/Anthology Series, Movie, or Special	Gary Megregian, Steve M. Stuhr, Jason Krane, Timothy A. Cleveland, Paul Diller, David Klotz, Noel Vought, Ginger Geary (for "Checking In")	Nominated
2016	68th Primetime Creative Arts Emmy Awards	Outstanding Makeup (Non-Prosthetic)	Eryn Krueger Mekash, Kim Ayers, Michael Mekash, Silvina Knight, Sarah Tanno	Won
2016	68th Primetime Creative Arts Emmy Awards	Outstanding Prosthetic Makeup	Eryn Krueger Mekash, Mike Mekash, Bradley A. Palmer, Bart Mixon, James MacKinnon, Kevin Kirkpatrick, David Leroy Anderson, Glen Eisner	Nominated
2016	20th OFTA Television Awards	Best Actress in a Motion Picture or Limited Series	Lady Gaga	Nominated
2016	20th OFTA Television Awards	Best Supporting Actress in a Motion Picture or Limited Series	Kathy Bates	Nominated
2016	20th OFTA Television Awards	Best Supporting Actress in a Motion Picture or Limited Series	Sarah Paulson	Nominated
2016	20th OFTA Television Awards	Best Limited Series	American Horror Story: Hotel	Nominated
2016	20th OFTA Television Awards	Best Ensemble in a Motion Picture or Limited Series	American Horror Story: Hotel	Nominated
2016	20th OFTA Television Awards	Best Direction of a Motion Picture or Limited Series	American Horror Story: Hotel	Nominated
2016	20th OFTA Television Awards	Best Writing of a Motion Picture or Limited Series	American Horror Story: Hotel	Nominated
2016	20th OFTA Television Awards	Best Music in a Non-Series	American Horror Story: Hotel	Nominated
2016	20th OFTA Television Awards	Best Editing in a Non-Series	American Horror Story: Hotel	Won
2016	20th OFTA Television Awards	Best Cinematography in a Non-Series	American Horror Story: Hotel	Nominated
2016	20th OFTA Television Awards	Best Production Design in a Non-Series	American Horror Story: Hotel	Won
2016	20th OFTA Television Awards	Best Costume Design in a Non-Series	American Horror Story: Hotel	Won
2016	20th OFTA Television Awards	Best Makeup/Hairstyling in a Non-Series	American Horror Story: Hotel	Won
2016	20th OFTA Television Awards	Best Sound in a Non-Series	American Horror Story: Hotel	Won
2016	20th OFTA Television Awards	Best Visual Effects in a Non-Series	American Horror Story: Hotel	Won
2016	Poppy Awards 2016	Best Limited Series/Movie	American Horror Story: Hotel	Won
2016	Poppy Awards 2016	Best Lead Actress, Limited Series/Movie	Lady Gaga	Won
2016	Poppy Awards 2016	Best Supporting Actor, Limited Series/Movie	Denis O'Hare	Won
2016	63rd MPSE Golden Reel Awards	TV Short Form – Dialogue / ADR	Gary Megregian (Supervising Sound Editor); Steve Stuhr (Supervising Dialogue Editor); Jason Krane (Dialogue Editor) (for "Checking In")	Nominated
2016	63rd MPSE Golden Reel Awards	TV Short Form – Music	David Klotz (Supervising Music Editor) (for "Checking In")	Nominated
2016	Gold Derby TV Awards 2016	Best Movie/Miniseries Supporting Actor	Denis O'Hare	Nominated
2016	Gold Derby TV Awards 2016	Best Movie/Miniseries Supporting Actress	Sarah Paulson	Nominated
2016	38th Jupiter Awards	Best International TV Series	American Horror Story: Hotel	Won
2016	16th Black Reel Awards	Outstanding Supporting Actress, TV Movie or Limited Series	Angela Bassett	Nominated
2016	37th Young Artist Awards	Best Performance in a TV Series - Recurring Young Actor (13 and Under)	Thomas Barbusca	Nominated

== See also ==
- List of vampire television series
