= Room Service (American Horror Story) =

- American Horror Story episode
- Episode no.: Season 5 Episode 5
- Directed by: Michael Goi
- Written by: Ned Martel
- Production code: 5ATS05
- Original air date: November 4, 2015
- Running time: 48 minutes

Guest appearances
- Finn Wittrock as Tristan Duffy; Mädchen Amick as Mrs. Ellison; Darren Criss as Justin; Robert Knepper as Lieutenant; Jessica Lu as Bronwyn; Lennon Henry as Holden Lowe; Kristen Ariza as Mrs. Pritchard; Mouzam Makkar as Nurse Leena

Episode chronology
← Previous "Devil's Night"	Next → "Room 33"
- American Horror Story: Hotel

"Room Service" is the fifth episode of the fifth season of the anthology television series American Horror Story. It aired on November 4, 2015, on the cable network FX. This episode was written by Ned Martel and directed by Michael Goi.

== Plot ==
Alex Lowe reaches Max Ellison's room in the hospital, who has gotten an infection from the measles, prompting the doctors to ask his mother to sign a DNR. Alex feeds on blood bags in a closet and injects some of her blood into Max, and saves him. Donovan and Iris meet Ramona Royale with the plan of making Iris their "inside man" to Elizabeth. At the hotel, Liz Taylor offers a drink to Iris, which turns out to be blood. Although Liz is excited about Iris' rebirth, the latter muses on her eternal life of being invisible.

Max runs to catch the school bus in a pirate costume, having eaten his parents in their kitchen. His class is decorating the classroom for Halloween, and his friend was worried about him. Max explains nearly dying from the measles, and while they lean in for a kiss, he bites her lip. The virus spreads, infecting other children, who kill the teacher and an administrator for their blood. The staff puts the school on lockdown, and a SWAT team escorts the infected children out of the school. Max's friend Maddy starts a fake story about a masked intruder, and the rest of the children follow suit.

At the police office, John Lowe tells his lieutenant about the Devil's Night, in spite of knowing how insane he sounds, and gets fired for instability. Social media personality Justin and his girlfriend check in wanting a discount for being famous. Iris leads them to Room 64, which they balk at. Downstairs, Elizabeth and Tristan Duffy head out costumed for the evening. They pass on a message for Will Drake that he is invited to join them for a party. Tristan and Elizabeth notice that Iris is nervous and smells different, which she writes off as Halloween stress.

Justin orders room service and mistreats Iris, which brings her to tears. They modify their order to pate, and Liz is happy to oblige them with cat food on a silver platter. Liz and Iris begin bonding, and the former confirms that she is not a gay man but a transgender woman. She recounts her married life as Nick Pryor in 1984, in Topeka, Kansas. She was a pharmaceutical representative for Eli Lilly, and used to hold transvestite sessions whenever she was on a business trip. Nick and two partners check into the Cortez, and he asks for a bottle of champagne, while the duo prepare to go to a party. The room service came with an unexpected visit from Elizabeth, who claims to have observed her since she walked into the hotel. Nick breaks down in front of Elizabeth, and she changes her into Liz Taylor. Elizabeth asks Liz to get some ice, and while coming back to the room, the two men humiliate her in the hallway, and Elizabeth kills them both. Liz never returned to Topeka, but she continued sending money earned from her new job at the hotel until her children turned 18. She insists that Iris teach the hipster couple some manners. The couple watch the news and continue complaining. Iris snaps and stabs them with a corkscrew and knife, and proceeds to feed on them.

John awakes in bed with Sally. She claims he dragged her into his room from the bar to have sex. John denies doing any of it and leaves Sally in the room, who shouts that it is their destiny to do it again and again. Iris thanks Liz for inspiring her, and they wheel the hipsters to the cadaver chute. Holden notices Alex has been turned. She starts working as the children's new governess and is concerned about John's presence in the hotel. Elizabeth tells Alex that she will have eternity with Holden, and the two share a coffin.

== Reception ==
"Room Service" was watched by 2.87 million people during its original broadcast, and gained a 1.5 ratings share among adults aged 18–49. It also ranked third in the Nielsen Social ratings, with 103,000 tweets seen by over 1.57 million people.

The episode received positive reviews from critics, earning a 73% approval rating based on 15 reviews, with an average score of 6.6/10, on Rotten Tomatoes. The critical consensus reads: "Though too many characters lead to extraneous subplots in "Room Service," one of Hotel's best backstories emerges with Denis O'Hare's portrayal of Liz Taylor." The Atlantic named "Room Service" one of the best television episodes of 2015.
