= Battle Royale (American Horror Story) =

- American Horror Story episode
- Episode no.: Season 5 Episode 11
- Directed by: Michael Uppendahl
- Written by: Ned Martel
- Production code: 5ATS11
- Original air date: January 6, 2016
- Running time: 47 minutes

Guest appearances
- Mare Winningham as Hazel Evers; Gabourey Sidibe as Queenie; Josh Pence as Nick Harley; Lindsay Pulsipher as Tina Black; Shree Crooks as Scarlett Lowe; Lennon Henry as Holden Lowe

Episode chronology
← Previous "She Gets Revenge"	Next → "Be Our Guest"
- American Horror Story: Hotel

"Battle Royale" is the eleventh episode of the fifth season of the anthology television series American Horror Story. It aired on January 6, 2016, on the cable network FX. This episode was written by Ned Martel and directed by Michael Uppendahl.

== Plot ==
Liz and Iris shoot The Countess and Donovan, and The Countess escapes while Donovan lies dying. At his request, Iris and Liz move him outside the hotel to die so his spirit will not be trapped inside forever. Sally saves The Countess, reviving her with blood from her vampire children, and reveals her past. Iris and Liz free Ramona to use as a weapon against The Countess. Ramona confronts a now-weak Countess Elizabeth but is seduced by her old lover. The Countess packs and is about to leave the hotel for good, but John guns her down as his final kill: "Thou Shalt Not Commit Murder." Now trapped in the hotel forever, The Countess' ghost arrives at March's suite, where he tells her that he can finally forgive The Countess for turning him in to the police; she reveals that she did not. Hazel admits she was the one who called the police so that she could have March to herself. March banishes Hazel from his presence, who feels oddly free now that she is not bound to him.

== Reception ==
"Battle Royale" was watched by 1.84 million people during its original broadcast, and gained a 0.9 ratings share among adults aged 18 to 49. It also ranked third in the Nielsen Social ratings, with 52,000 tweets seen by over 897,000 people.

The episode received positive reviews, earning an 82% approval rating based on 11 reviews, with an average score of 6.4/10, on review aggregator Rotten Tomatoes. The critical consensus reads: "Thanks to a story that starts pulling the viewer toward the end of the season – and a surprise special appearance from a familiar character – "Battle Royale" is a penultimate episode with more than enough momentum to overcome its flaws."
