= Devil's Night (American Horror Story) =

- American Horror Story episode
- Episode no.: Season 5 Episode 4
- Directed by: Loni Peristere
- Written by: Jennifer Salt
- Production code: 5ATS04
- Original air date: October 28, 2015
- Running time: 49 minutes

Guest appearances
- Finn Wittrock as Tristan Duffy; Mare Winningham as Hazel Evers; Lily Rabe as Aileen Wuornos; Richard T. Jones as Detective Andy Hahn; John Carroll Lynch as John Wayne Gacy; Seth Gabel as Jeffrey Dahmer; Anthony Ruivivar as Richard Ramirez; Nico Evers-Swindell as Craig; Shree Crooks as Scarlett Lowe; Lennon Henry as Holden Lowe

Episode chronology
← Previous "Mommy"	Next → "Room Service"
- American Horror Story: Hotel

"Devil's Night" is the fourth episode of the fifth season of the anthology television series American Horror Story. It aired on October 28, 2015, on the cable network FX. This episode was written by Jennifer Salt and directed by Loni Peristere.

== Plot ==
Richard Ramirez, who died in 2013, checks in for the Devil's Night. Liz Taylor leads him to his room, where a married couple is sleeping. After killing the husband, the wife runs screaming from the room, where she is killed by James March.

While answering a phone call from Scarlett, John Lowe notices his ceiling and wall are bleeding. Miss Evers is having trouble getting out a difficult bloodstain as well. Every Halloween, she is reminded of her son, who was kidnapped in 1925. John arrives to question the blood coming from her room, and they talk as she explains that her son was taken to a ranch outside town, and all they found was the costume. His kidnapper had taken and killed many children and disposed of their bodies with quick lime and set them in a mass grave. After the recounting, her mood upswings as she blathers on about preparations for the festivities. Alex Lowe has brought Holden home, but the family dog rejects him. As she returns with a glass of juice for Holden, she finds him feeding on the dog's neck. He does not feel well, and wants his "other mommy".

Alex returns with Holden to the hotel, and the boy scampers to his coffin. Elizabeth appears and explains that she saves children from neglect and speaks about John as she walked Holden away from the carousel herself. She goes on to explain the viral infection. An aggravated Alex holds her at gunpoint, wanting a cure, but Elizabeth wants loyalty in exchange for passing on the virus to her. John discovers the Wineville Chicken Coop Murders that Evers mentioned took place 85 years prior. He heads to the hotel's bar to drink a double martini. Aileen Wuornos enters for her 13th Devil's Night, and John recognizes her as Halloween costume. Liz mentions that John is a special guest of the hotel and a cop. Aileen offers him sex, and they go to his room.

While tied to a chair, he slowly realizes what Devil's Night at the Hotel Cortez involves, and they fight until he handcuffs her in the bathroom and finds her (true) Driver's License. He returns to the guestbook and finds plenty of serial killers have signed in. Liz describes March's annual tradition and discovers John himself is on the invitation list. He arrives at Room 78 for dinner. There March introduces himself and John reminds him that March would have died 85 years prior. March counter-reminds him that anything is possible in the hotel. John Wayne Gacy and Jeffrey Dahmer introduce themselves, and John recognizes the Zodiac Killer, Aileen, and Richard Ramirez on his own, when Gacy handcuffs him to his chair.

As the dinner continues, Evers brings out a drugged young man as an appetizer. John tries to shoot Dahmer to prevent him from trepanning the young man, not knowing that the shot will have no effect on ghosts. Outside the hotel, Sally muses with a man named Craig about Halloween. She brings him in, which will buy her a year of solitude from March. The killers all take turns stabbing Craig. Sally sees the distressed John, and tells him he has been hallucinating from the alcohol and leads him away. Alex accepts Elizabeth's request to join her and sucks blood from Elizabeth's breast.

== Reception ==
The episode was watched by 3.04 million people during its original broadcast, and gained a 1.6 ratings share among adults aged 18–49. It ranked second in the Nielsen Social ratings, with 96,000 tweets seen by over 1.91 million people, only behind the Republican Debate.

The episode received positive reviews from critics, earning an 87% approval rating based on 15 reviews, with an average score of 6.62/10, on Rotten Tomatoes. The critical consensus reads: ""Devil's Night" is an entertaining departure from the overarching story of Hotel—though the episode's preachiness feels out of place coming from American Horror Story."
