= Ned Martel =

American screenwriter and producer

- Born: United States
- Occupations: Television writer, producer, columnist
- Years active: 2009–present

Ned Martel is an American television writer, producer and former columnist.

He is well known for his work on the Fox musical series Glee; and for FX's American Horror Story.

== Career ==
Martel was The Washington Post's style editor from 2009 to 2012, before leaving to work at Ryan Murphy Television and for Murphy himself. He started as an executive story editor on Glee's fifth season. Over the course of his time there he contributed two scripts. He was associate producer on HBO's The Normal Heart; and a producer on Inside Look: The People vs. O. J. Simpson, which won him a shared EMMY Award (along with Murphy, Stephanie Gibbons, Sally Daws, and Sue Keeton). Since its fifth year, Martel has served as a writer and co-producer on Murphy and Brad Falchuk's American Horror Story; writing episodes "Room Service" and "Battle Royale".
