= Chutes and Ladders (American Horror Story) =

- American Horror Story episode
- Episode no.: Season 5 Episode 2
- Directed by: Bradley Buecker
- Written by: Tim Minear
- Production code: 5ATS02
- Original air date: October 14, 2015
- Running time: 73 minutes

Guest appearances
- Finn Wittrock as Tristan Duffy; Mare Winningham as Hazel Evers; Naomi Campbell as Claudia Bankson; Max Greenfield as Gabriel; Richard T. Jones as Detective Hahn; Mädchen Amick as Mrs. Ellison; Shree Crooks as Scarlett Lowe; Helena Mattsson as Agnetha; Kamilla Alnes as Vendela; Lennon Henry as Holden Lowe; Lyric Lennon as Lachlan Drake

Episode chronology
← Previous "Checking In"	Next → "Mommy"
- American Horror Story: Hotel

"Chutes and Ladders" is the second episode of the fifth season of the anthology television series American Horror Story. It aired on October 14, 2015, on the cable network FX. The episode was written by Tim Minear and directed by Bradley Buecker.

== Plot ==
Will Drake, the new owner of the Cortez, hosts a fashion show in the hotel starring model and actor Tristan Duffy. Tristan quits the show and gets into the elevator to leave the hotel. The elevator stops on floor 7, which is dark and appears deserted. Tristan meets Mr. March. The Countess turns Tristan into a vampire, and the two engage in a relationship. Donovan becomes jealous, resulting in The Countess ending their relationship.

Iris tells Detective Lowe the history of the hotel. Lachlan Drake shows Lowe's eight-year-old daughter Scarlett a room that contains coffins for The Countess' vampire children. Scarlett recognizes her brother, Holden, in one of the coffins and later finds Holden in the secret room playing video games. She takes a photo with him to prove to her parents that he is alive, but they do not believe her. When Scarlett shows them the photo, Holden's face is blurred.

== Reception ==
"Chutes and Ladders" was watched by 4.06 million viewers during its original broadcast, and gained a 2.2 ratings share among adults aged 18–49. It also generated 225,000 tweets seen by over 2.97 million people, ranking first for the second consecutive week.

The episode received positive reviews from critics, earning an 77% approval rating based on 13 reviews, with an average score of 7.4/10, on Rotten Tomatoes. The critical consensus reads: ""Chutes and Ladders" adds welcome backstory to Hotel's growing mythology while still packing plenty of shock value."
