= Checking In (American Horror Story) =

- American Horror Story episode
- Two Swedish tourists checking into the Hotel Cortez
- Episode no.: Season 5 Episode 1
- Directed by: Ryan Murphy
- Written by: Ryan Murphy; Brad Falchuk
- Production code: 5ATS01
- Original air date: October 7, 2015
- Running time: 64 minutes

Guest appearances
- Mare Winningham as Hazel Evers; Christine Estabrook as Marcy; Max Greenfield as Gabriel; Richard T. Jones as Detective Andy Hahn; Shree Crooks as Scarlett Lowe; Helena Mattsson as Agnetha; Kamilla Alnes as Vendela; Lennon Henry as Holden Lowe; Lyric Lennon as Lachlan Drake

Episode chronology
← Previous "Curtain Call"	Next → "Chutes and Ladders"
- American Horror Story: Hotel

"Checking In" is the premiere episode of the fifth season of the anthology television series American Horror Story. It aired on October 7, 2015, on the cable network FX. The episode was co-written by creators Ryan Murphy and Brad Falchuk and directed by Murphy.

== Plot ==
Two female Swedish tourists check into the Hotel Cortez in downtown Los Angeles. They find a disfigured creature sewn into their room's mattress.

Detective John Lowe, investigating a ritualist murder of an adulturous couple, is called by the murderer to go to the Cortez for clues. He sees a vision there of his missing son, Holden, who was abducted five years earlier. Heroin addict Gabriel checks in and is violently raped by the Addiction Demon.

The resident couple, Countess Elizabeth and Donovan, have a foursome with a couple they met, murdering them after and savoring their blood. In a 1994 flashback, it is revealed that the hotel manager Iris defenestrated a woman to her death after that woman had drugged Donovan to death. Detective Lowe receives a text from his wife saying that she is in trouble. He rushes to the scene with his daughter in the car. His daughter then finds two dead men in the house. To keep his family safe, Detective Lowe moves out of his home and into Room 64. The new owner of the hotel, Mr. Will Drake, and his son arrive to live in the Penthouse. The Countess takes Drake's son to a secret room containing white-haired children and introduces him to Detective Lowe's abducted son, Holden.

== Reception ==
=== Ratings ===
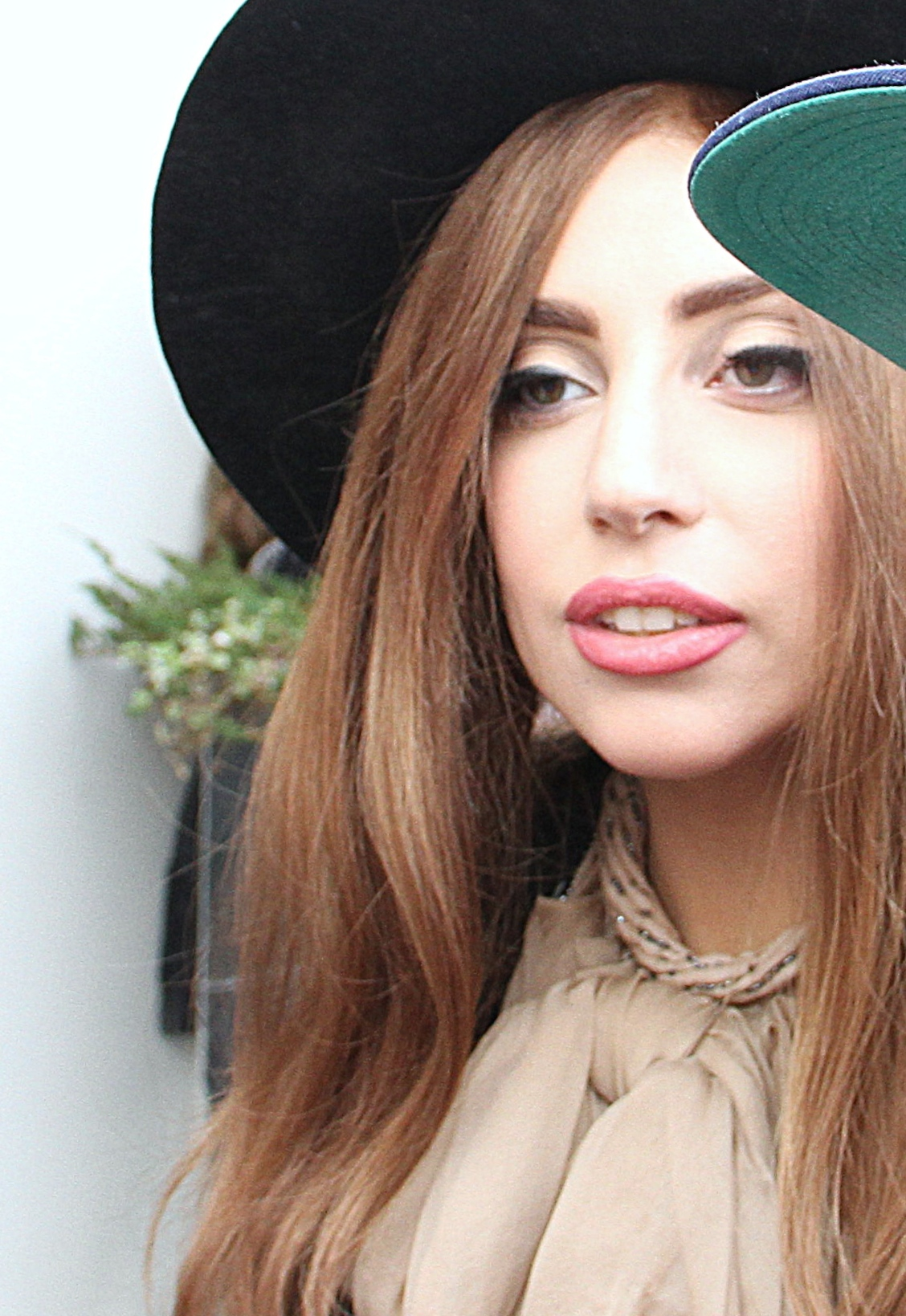
Lady Gaga's performance received mixed reviews from critics, but the style of The Countess was praised.

"Checking In" gained a 3.0 18–49 ratings share and was watched by 5.81 million viewers, leading the night on cable, about a 5% dip from the American Horror Story: Freak Show premiere. It also topped the social ratings, driving 878,000 tweets seen by over 5.4 million people. The episode averaged a 3.0 rating in the 18–49 years adult demographic, the most sought after by advertisers, and ranked second among all primetime series aired on Wednesday night, only behind Fox's drama Empire. After factoring in delayed viewing, the episode rose to 9.1 million, with 6.13 million in the 18–49 demographic, while combined linear, non-linear and encore viewing, it drew 12.17 million viewers through October 11. "Checking In" is notable for being the second longest episode in the series' history, clocking in at 64 minutes, tied with the premiere of the fourth season.

=== Critical response ===
The episode received mostly positive reviews from critics. On review aggregator website Rotten Tomatoes, the episode has an approval rating of 79% based on 14 reviews. The critical consensus reads: "American Horror Story: Hotel opens spectacularly with "Checking In," though its shocking moments and stylistic flourishes outweigh a compelling narrative."

Amber Dowling of TheWrap gave a positive review, saying, "It's a visual, visceral romp into what is being set up to be another haphazard foray into the world of horror, as imagined by Murphy and his writing counterpart Brad Falchuk. The show has rarely made sense in terms of story, and this is no exception." Writing for Variety, Brian Lowry praised Gaga's character as "gloriously photographed" and felt her addition to the show was "extraordinarily well-timed". Emily L. Stephens from The A.V. Club and Jeff Jensen of Entertainment Weekly both gave a B− rating. Stephens praised Gaga's first appearance as "slickly exploitative and hellishly effective", while Jensen described her as "the show's most potent symbol for all of its themes about our "Bad Romance" with fame, fortune, sex, sex, and more sex, materialism and consumerism, the denial of death and the corrupt want for cultural immortality."

On the other hand, Dan Fienberg of The Hollywood Reporter gave a negative review, writing, "If last year's installment, Freak Show, was too frustratingly literal in terms of plot points and its freaks-as-all-outsiders metaphor for some viewers, Hotel will be a welcome return to oblique storytelling, loopy Freudian psychobabble and addiction undertones". Mike Hale from The New York Times complained that it "suffers from the absence of Jessica Lange". IGN's Matt Fowler gave a rating of 5.9 out of 10, criticizing the episode as "mediocre" and concluding that "all weight and meaning is gone".

Gaga's performance also received mixed reviews from critics. Matt Zoller Sietz of Vulture called Gaga "terrible here in the way that Madonna was terrible in a lot of her '90s films, at once too poised and too blank." David Weigand of the San Francisco Chronicle said Gaga "makes an enormous visual impact, but the minute she opens her mouth to deliver a line, it's obvious that acting just isn't one of her many talents." Ben Travers of IndieWire wrote that he "wouldn't go so far as to say Gaga's talent adds much to the proceedings, but her presence – and the manner in which its captured – certainly does."
