= 12th Visual Effects Society Awards =

US film and TV awards ceremony in 2014

12th Visual Effects Society Awards

February 12, 2014

Best Visual Effects in a Visual Effects Driven Motion Picture:
Gravity

The 12th Visual Effects Society Awards was held in Los Angeles at the Beverly Hilton Hotel on February 12, 2014, in honor to the best visual effects in film and television of 2013. Patton Oswalt was the host.

== Winners and nominees ==
(winners in bold)

=== Honorary Awards ===
Lifetime Achievement Award:

- **John Dykstra**

VES Visionary Award:

- **Alfonso Cuarón**

=== Film ===
Outstanding Visual Effects in a Visual Effects Driven Feature Motion Picture	Outstanding Supporting Visual Effects in a Feature Motion Picture
**Gravity** – Tim Webber, Nikki Penny, Chris Lawrence, Richard Mcbride: The Hobbit: The Desolation of Smaug – Joe Letteri, Eric Saindon, Kevin Sherwood, David Clayton; Iron Man 3 – Christopher Townsend, Mark Soper, Guy Williams, Bryan Grill; Pacific Rim – John Knoll, Susan Greenhow, Chris Raimo, Hal Hickel; Star Trek Into Darkness – Roger Guyett, Luke O’Byrne, Ron Ames, Ben Grossman	**The Lone Ranger** – Tim Alexander, Gary Brozenich, Shari Hanson, Kevin Martel: The Great Gatsby – Chris Godfrey, Prue Fletcher, Joyce Cox; Rush – Jody Johnson, Moriah Etherington-Sparks, Mark Hodgkins, Antoine Moulineau; The Secret Life of Walter Mitty – Guillaume Rocheron, Kurt Williams, Monette Dubin, Ivan Moran; White House Down – Marc Weigert, Volker Engel, Julia Frey, Ollie Rankin; The Wolf of Wall Street – Robert Legato, Mark Russell, Joseph Farrell, Lisa Spence
Outstanding Animation in an Animated Feature Motion Picture	Outstanding Animated Character in a Live Action Feature Motion Picture
**Frozen** – Chris Buck, Jennifer Lee, Peter Del Vecho, Lino Di Salvo: Cloudy with a Chance of Meatballs 2 – Peter Nash, Michael Ford, Chris Juen, Mandy Tankenson; The Croods – Jane Hartwell, Chris Sanders, Kirk Demicco, Markus Manninen; Despicable Me 2 – Chris Meledandri, Janet Healy, Chris Renaud, Pierre Coffin; Monsters University – Kori Rae, Sanjay Bakshi, Jon Reisch, Scott Clark	**The Hobbit: The Desolation of Smaug** – **Smaug** – Eric Reynolds, David Clayton, Myriam Catrin, Guillaume Francois: Gravity – Ryan – Max Solomon, Mathieu Vig, Michael Brunet, David Shirk; Oz the Great and Powerful – China Girl – Troy Saliba, In-Ah Roediger, Carolyn Vale, Kevin Souls; Pacific Rim – Kaiju-Leatherback – Jakub Pistecky, Frank Gravatt, Cyrus Jam, Chris Havreberg
Outstanding Animated Character in an Animated Feature Motion Picture	Outstanding Created Environment in a Live Action Feature Motion Picture
**Frozen** – **Bringing the Snow Queen to Life** – Alexander Alvarado, Joy Johnson, Chad Stubblefield, Wayne Unten: Epic – Bomba – Thom Roberts, Haven Gordon Cousins, Tim Bower, Daniel Lima; Epic – Mary Katherine - Jeff Gabor, Dylan C. Maxwell, Sang Jun Lee, Chris Pagoria; The Croods – Eep – Line Andersen, Won Young Byun, Koji Morihiro, Chris De St. Jeor	**Gravity** – **Exterior** – Paul Beilby, Kyle Mcculloch, Stuart Penn, Ian Comley: Elysium – Torus – Votch Levi, Joshua Ong, Barry Poon; Gravity – Interior – Harry Bardak, Nathan Walster, Jonathan Fawkner, Claire Michaud; Iron Man 3 – Shipyard – John Stevenson-Galvin, Greg Notzelman, Paul Harris, Justin Stockton; Pacific Rim – Virtual Hong Kong – Johan Thorngren, Jeremy Bloch, David Meny, Polly Ing
Outstanding Created Environment in an Animated Feature Motion Picture	Outstanding Virtual Cinematography in a Live Action Feature Motion Picture
**Frozen** – **Elsa's Ice Palace** – Virgilio John Aquino, Alessandro Jacomini, Lance Summers, David Womersley: The Croods – The Maze – Jonathan Harman, Violette Sacre-Shaik, Benjamin Venancie, Philippe Brochu; Epic – Pod Patch – Aaron Ross, Travis Price, Jake Panian, Antelmo Villarreal; Monsters University – Campus – Robert Kondo, Eric Andraos, Dale Ruffolo, Peter Sumanaseni	**Gravity** – Tim Webber, Emmanuel Lubezki, Richard Mcbride, Dale Newton: The Hobbit: The Desolation of Smaug – Christian Rivers, Phil Barrenger, Mark Gee, Thelvin Tico Cabezas; Iron Man 3 – Mark Smith, Aaron Gilman, Thelvin Cabezas, Gerardo Ramirez; Man of Steel – Daniel Paulsson, Edmund Kolloen, Joel Prager, David Stripinis; Pacific Rim – Hong Kong Ocean Brawl – Colin Benoit, Nick Walker, Adam Schnitzer, Victor Schutz
Outstanding Models in a Feature Motion Picture	Outstanding FX and Simulation Animation in a Live Action Feature Motion Picture
**Gravity – ISS Exterior** – Ben Lambert, Paul Beilby, Chris Lawrence, Andy Nicholson: Pacific Rim – David Fogler, Alex Jaeger, Aaron Wilson, David Behrens; Star Trek Into Darkness – Bruce Holcomb, Ron Woodall, John Goodson, Thomas Fejes; The Lone Ranger – Colby Locomotive – Rene Garcia, Steve Walton, Brian Paik, Gerald Gutschmidt	**Gravity – Parachute and ISS Destruction** – Alexis Wajsbrot, Sylvain Degrotte, Horacio Mendoza, Juan-Luis Sanchez: The Hobbit: The Desolation of Smaug – Areito Echevarria, Andreas Soderstrom, Ronnie Menahem, Christoph Sprenger; Man of Steel – Brian Goodwin, Gray Horsfield, Mathieu Chardonnet, Adrien Toupet; Pacific Rim – Fluid Simulation & Destruction - Ryan Hopkins, Michael Balog, Patrick Conran, Rick Hankins
Outstanding FX and Simulation Animation in an Animated Feature Motion Picture	Outstanding Compositing in a Feature Motion Picture
**Frozen** – **Elsa's Blizzard** – Eric W. Araujo, Marc Bryant, Dong Joo Byun, Tim Molinder: Cloudy with a Chance of Meatballs 2 – Andrew Hofman, Alex Moaveni; The Croods – Jeff Budsberg, Andre Le Blanc, Jason Mayer, Michael Losure; Epic – Boggan Crowds – Thierry Dervieux-Lecocq, David Gatenby, Mark Adams, Matthew D. Simmons	**Gravity** – Mark Bakowski, Anthony Smith, Theodor Groeneboom, Adrian Metzelaar: Elysium – Jean Lapointe, Jordan Benwick, Robin Hackl, Janeen Elliott; The Hobbit: The Desolation of Smaug – Charles Tait, Robin Hollander, Giuseppe Tagliavini, Sean Heuston; Iron Man 3 – Barrel of Monkeys – Michael Maloney, Francis Puthanangadi, Justin Van Der Lek, Howard Cabalfin; Iron Man 3 – House Attack – Darren Poe, Stefano Trivelli, Josiah Howison, Zach Zaubi

=== Television ===
Outstanding Visual Effects in a Broadcast Program	Outstanding Supporting Visual Effects in a Broadcast Program
**Game of Thrones** – **Valar Dohaeris** – Steve Kullback, Joe Bauer, Jörn Großhans, Sven Martin: Almost Human – Jay Worth, Robert Habros, Michael Cliett, David Beedon; Battlestar Galactica: Blood & Chrome – Gary Hutzel, Michael Gibson, Derek Ledbetter, Heather Mcauliff; Inseparable – Chernobyl – Egor Olesov, Egor Borschevsky, Dmitry Ovcharenko, Mykhailo Datsyk; Agents of S.H.I.E.L.D. – Pilot – Mark Kolpack, Sabrina Arnold, David Altenau, H Haden Hammond	**Banshee** – **Pilot** – Armen Kevorkian, Mark Skowronski, Jeremy Jozwik, Ricardo Ramirez: The Borgias – Relics – Wojciech Zielinski, Neishaw Ali, Bill Halliday, Jp Giamos; Da Vinci's Demons – The Lovers – Kevin Blank, Simon Frame, Ante Dekovic, Oliver Arnold; Hawaii Five-0 – Ho'onani Makuakane – Armen Kevorkian, Alexander Soltes, Jane Sharvina, Andranik Taranyan; Mob City – A Guy Walks into a Bar – Jason Sperling, Michael Morreale, Valeri Pfahning, Mike Enriquez; Moonfleet – Episode 2 – Ed Bruce, Alan Collins, John O’Connell, Joe Courtis
Outstanding Visual Effects in a Commercial	Outstanding Animated Character in a Commercial or Broadcast Program
**PETA: 99% Human** – Angus Kneale, Vince Baertsoen, Colin Blaney, Kyle Cody: Call of Duty: Epic Night Out – Leighton Greer, Robert Sethi, Felix Urquiza, Chris Knight; Galaxy Chauffeur – Helen Hughes, Simon French, William Bartlett, Stephen Cullingford; Liberty Group Limited: Answer – James Atkinson, Rachel Mariscal, Scott Meadows, David Liu; Sony PlayStation: Perfect Day – Charlotte Arnold, Joji Tsuruga, Gavin Wellsman, Olivier Mitonneau	**PETA** – **98% Human** – Vince Baertsoen, Alex Allain, Henning Koczy: Game of Thrones – Raising the Dragons – Philip Meyer, Ingo Schachner, Travis Nobles, Florian Friedmann; Smithwick's – Squirrel – Tom Bussell, Jorge Montiel, Tom Raynor, Leonardo Costa; Three, The Pony – Carsten Keller, Jake Mengers, Tim Van Hussen; Toy Story of Terror – Paul Aichele, Kiki Mei Kee Poh, Andrew Coats
Outstanding Created Environment in a Commercial or Broadcast Program	Outstanding Virtual Cinematography in a Live-Action Commercial or Broadcast Program
**Game of Thrones** – **The Climb** – Patrick Zentis, Mayur Patel, Nitin Singh, Tim Alexander: Hell on Wheels – Big Bad Wolf – Steve Meyer, Matt Von Brock, Mitch Gates, Antonio Chang; Inseparable – Chernobyl – Dmitry Ovcharenko, Igor Chopenko, Dmitry Eremenko, Andrey Bogdanov; Liberty Group Limited: Answer – Greg Teegarden, Kevin Bouchez, Brian Creasey, Kurt Lawson	**The Crew** – Dominique Boidin, Rémi Kozyra, Léon Bérelle, Maxime Luère: Mad Max: Ethos – Aladino Debert, Neil Huxley, David Liu, Michael Harbour; Murdered: Soul Suspect – Vernon Wilbert, Tim Jones, Rafael Colon, April Warren; Qualcomm Snapdragon: A Dragon is Coming – Joshua Wassung, Shannon Justison, Shayne Ryan, Seth Gollub
Outstanding FX and Simulation Animation in a Commercial or Broadcast Program	Outstanding Compositing in a Broadcast Program
**PETA: 98% Human** – Vince Baertsoen, Jimmy Gass, Dave Barosin: Sony PlayStation: Perfect Day – Joji Tsuruga, Gavin Wellsman, Nick Couret, Hassan Taimur; Toyota Avalon: Formula – Ed Laag, Eugene Gauran, Josh Hatton; Toy Story of Terror – Jane Yen, Rogan Griffin, Amit Baadkar, Keith Daniel Klohn	**Game of Thrones** – **The Climb** – Kirk Brillon, Steve Gordon, Geoff Sayer, Winston Lee: Banshee – Pilot – Gevork Babityan, Andranik Taranyan, Matt Kelly, Matthieu Perin; Game of Thrones – The Conquering of Yunkai – Sean Faden, Greg Szafranski, Florian Friedmann, Travis Nobles; Vikings – Dispossessed – Ovidiu Cinazan, Gary Couto, Marco Lee, Maria Gordon
Outstanding Compositing in a Commercial	
**Call of Duty: Epic Night Out** – Chris Knight, Daniel Thuresson, Nick Tayler, Dag Ivarsory: Jean-Paul Gaultier: The Sailor – Jerome Billet, Arnaud Leviez; Mercedes: Sensations – Laurent Creusot, Pierre Emmanuel Genin, David Roubah, Damien Canameras; Sony PlayStation: Greatness Awaits – Kyle Cody, Dan Difelice; Sony PlayStation: Perfect Day – Gavin Wellsman, John Mangia, Leonardo Costa, Kristen Johnson	

=== Other categories ===
Outstanding Real-Time Visuals in a Video Game	Outstanding Visual Effects in a Special Venue Project
**Call of Duty: Ghosts** – Mark Rubin, Richard Kriegler, David Johnson, Alessandro Nardini: Crysis 3 – Magnus Larbrant, Tiago Sousa, Steven Bender, Cevat Yerli; Killzone: Shadow Fall – Marijn Giesbertz, Jan-Bart Van Beek, Angie Smets; NBA 2K14 – Heather Marshall, Joseph Clark, Jeff Thomas, Anton Dawson; Ryse: Son of Rome – Cevat Yerli, Peter Gornstein, Chris Evans, Brian Chambers	**Space Shuttle Atlantis** – Daren Ulmer, John Gross, Cedar Connor, Christian Bloch: Hayden Planetarium's Dark Universe – Vivian Trakinski, Jon Parker, Carter Emmart, Andreas Wetteborn; Mysteries of the Unseen World – Sean Phillips, Andy Yamada, Fred Pienkos, Matthew Sugars; Mystic Manor – Tim Landry, John Guerra, Mark Schirmer, Ken Horii; SpongeBob SquarePants 4D: The Great Jelly Rescue! – Kate Crandall, Brent Young, Michael “Oz” Smith, Andrei Brovcenco
Outstanding Visual Effects in a Student Project	
**Rugbybugs** – Alexandra Stautmeister: Initium – Alexandre Dechel, Adrien Lambert, Emeric Larochette, James Ross-Greetham; Morphium – Linus Stetter; Runaway – Ludovic Fregé, Quentin Medda, Romain Chauliac, Yoann Gouraud; Where the Dream Begins – Dun Ma, Dan Wen Lei, Xuan Xia	
