= Congregation Kneses Tifereth Israel =

Conservative synagogue in Port Chester, New York

- (Hebrew: כנסת תפארת ישראל)
- Location in New York

Religion
- Affiliation: Conservative Judaism
- Ecclesiastical or organizational status: Synagogue
- Leadership: Rabbi Ben Goldberg; Cantor Alexis Sklar
- Status: Active

Location
- Location: 575 King Street, Port Chester, New York 10573
- Country: United States
- Interactive map of Congregation Kneses Tifereth Israel
- Coordinates: 41°01′25″N 73°40′14″W

Architecture
- Architect: Philip Johnson
- Type: Synagogue
- Style: International
- Established: September 19, 1887 (as a congregation)
- Completed: 1956

Website
- congkti.org

Congregation Kneses Tifereth Israel (Hebrew: כנסת תפארת ישראל), abbreviated as Congregation KTI, is a Conservative congregation and synagogue located at 575 King Street, in Port Chester, New York, United States.

== Early years ==
Founded on September 19, 1887 (the first day of Rosh Hashanah in the year 5648) in the home of one of its members. In its early years, the congregation was made up of Jews who were "dissatisfied" with "a service that did not reflect their achievements and aspirations" nor satisfy their "emotional need for acknowledgement of their European roots" (93 The Jews of Westchester by Shragel and Drimmer). It was a time when Jewish communities bifurcated "as much for social reasons as for differences in ideology" (94). While mostly Orthodox in background, many of the members began to look more flexibly at traditions, which was seen as a somewhat necessary step. Some favored Friday evening services where men could linger. However, social strife crept in and "uncomfortable with the presence of German Jews at Port Chester's Kneses Israel," eight Russian peddlers split off to create Congregation Tifereth Israel in 1903. Both groups were drawn to more flexible conservative practice, which was not yet recognized, but were not seeking the more popular Reform movement. Finding their roots in a more Conservative practice that preserved the bulk of their religious and social traditions, the two congregations merged in 1927, forming what is now Congregation Kneses Tifereth Israel.

With more members, meeting at congregants' homes became untenable, and they sought to acquire property. While it is not clear when it was purchased, KTI was housed, for some time, in the Traverse Avenue Synagogue and was sold in 1960 to the Port Chester Carver Center. In 1953, the congregation purchased the land on which it remains and the campus currently houses four buildings (two residences for clergy, the Gantz School building, and the main sanctuary). Today, the congregation draws membership from the greater Westchester area—specifically from Rye, Port Chester, Rye Brook, and nearby Greenwich, Connecticut.

== Modern synagogue ==
The building was designed by the architect Philip Johnson in 1954–56 in the International Style, with a simple interior and a ceiling of curving plaster panels, and completed in 1956. He did not charge a fee. The building has been called "a form of atonement" for his previous pro-fascist and anti-Semitic articles in the late 1930s.

The design of the building was intended to scale for the high holidays when attendance "swells." The original design included a bema decoration by sculptor Ibram Lassaw. The majority of the bema decor was acquired by the Jewish Museum in Manhattan following the renovation of the sanctuary in 2006 to increase accessibility and meet the changing needs of the congregation.

=== Building uses ===
In 2013, the campus was chosen to be used as the site of Jonathan Tropper's film adaptation of This Is Where I Leave You. Interior and exterior scenes of the synagogue were shot on the site and approximately 40 congregants were used as extras.

== Bibliography ==
- Taschen, Aurelia and Balthazar (2016). L'Architecture Moderne de A à Z (in French). Bibliotheca Universalis. ISBN 978-3-8365-5630-9.
- Geva, Anat. "An Architect Asks For Forgiveness: Philip Johnson's Port Chester Synagogue" (PDF). Symposium of Architecture, Culture and Spirituality. ACS Forum.
