= List of Banshee episodes =

Banshee is an American crime drama television series created by Jonathan Tropper and David Schickler for Cinemax. The series takes place in the fictional small town of Banshee, Pennsylvania. After serving 15 years in prison for stealing diamonds from Ukrainian gangster Rabbit (Ben Cross), the unnamed protagonist (Antony Starr) travels to Banshee to find his heist accomplice and former lover, Anastasia (Ivana Miličević). When he finds her, the protagonist learns that she is now a married mother of two living under the assumed identity of Carrie Hopewell. When the incoming Sheriff is killed, the protagonist takes on his identity as Lucas Hood, becoming the town's new Sheriff, using his own brand of unorthodox methods. Banshee sees Hood struggle with adapting to his new identity while dealing with the machinations of local crime lord Kai Proctor (Ulrich Thomsen) and remaining hidden from Rabbit. The series premiered on January 11, 2013. During the course of the series, 38 episodes of Banshee aired over four seasons, between January 11, 2013, and May 20, 2016.

== Series overview ==
| Season | Episodes | Originally released | |
| Season | Episodes | First released | Last released |
|---|---|---|---|
| 1 | 10 | January 11, 2013 | March 15, 2013 |
| 2 | 10 | January 10, 2014 | March 14, 2014 |
| 3 | 10 | January 9, 2015 | March 13, 2015 |
| 4 | 8 | April 1, 2016 | May 20, 2016 |

== Episodes ==
=== Season 1 (2013) ===
| No. overall | No. in season | Title | Directed by | Written by | Original release date | US viewers (millions) |
|---|---|---|---|---|---|---|
| 1 | 1 | "Pilot" | Greg Yaitanes | Jonathan Tropper & David Schickler | January 11, 2013 | 0.483 |
After serving a fifteen year prison sentence, an unnamed criminal (Antony Starr) flees New York City when he is attacked by a group of gangsters. He heads to the small town of Banshee, Pennsylvania in search of his ex-lover and former accomplice Anastasia (Ivana Miličević), who is living under the name Carrie Hopewell with her new husband Gordon (Rus Blackwell) and their two children Deva (Ryann Shane) and Max (Gabriel Suttle). When the town's newly-appointed sheriff Lucas Hood (Griff Furst) is killed in a bar robbery, the criminal assumes his identity and takes up the mantle of sheriff of Banshee, with only the bar owner Sugar Bates (Frankie Faison) knowing the truth. Lucas learns from Banshee's young mayor Dan Kendall (Daniel Ross Owens) that the town is under the stranglehold of business owner and criminal entrepreneur Kai Proctor (Ulrich Thomsen), a former Amish who abandoned his faith in favor of illegal enterprises. Back in New York, mysterious crime boss Rabbit (Ben Cross) sends gangsters after a former contact of Lucas's, Job (Hoon Lee), who helped Lucas forge paperwork to become sheriff. Job manages to escape, displeasing Rabbit, who instructs his employee to "find them both quickly."
| 2 | 2 | "The Rave" | SJ Clarkson | Jonathan Tropper & David Schickler | January 18, 2013 | N/A |
Lucas is haunted by the memories of the night he was arrested, when he led the police away from Ana (now Carrie) so that she could escape with a consignment of diamonds they had stolen from Rabbit. He confronts her about his lingering feelings for her, but finds her reluctant to reciprocate. Meanwhile, Kai Proctor begins trying to earn Lucas's loyalty by warning him about the Moody Brothers, a local gang, but Lucas is determined to stay clean as he continues to build his new identity. Deva skips school with her boyfriend Reed (Hunter Garner), who takes her to a drug den operated by a local dealer, Hanson (Toby Leonard Moore). He invites them to a barn rave, where he sells ecstasy. After a run-in with the Moody Brothers, Lucas has a one night stand with Rebecca Bowman (Lili Simmons), a devout Amish girl by day but a rebellious party-girl by night. Things at the rave get out of control when several people (including Reed) O.D. Thanks to a tip from Rebecca's father Elijah, Lucas and the rest of the BSD arrive to break up the rave, but not in time to save Reed's life. Hanson escapes and is revealed to be working for Proctor, who feeds Hanson to his Rottweiler for selling the tainted drugs.
| 3 | 3 | "Meet the New Boss" | OC Madsen | Jonathan Tropper & David Schickler | January 25, 2013 | 0.405 |
In New York, Carrie drops in on Rabbit, who is revealed to be her father. He offers her a deal: return the diamonds she stole from him the night she disappeared and deliver Lucas to him and he will leave her alone forever. Meanwhile, an MMA prizefighter named Mr. Sanchez (Cedric Stewart) arrives in Banshee for an exhibition fight as part of a deal between Proctor and Benjamin Longshadow (Russell Means) to build a new casino. When Sanchez beats and rapes a local cocktail waitress, Lucas uses it as an opportunity to prove to Proctor that he is not for sale and, after a vicious fight with Sanchez, beats the prizefighter nearly to death and ruins Proctor's deal with Longshadow. One of the spectators uploads a video of the incident to YouTube. Proctor confronts Lucas about his poor decision and suggests that Lucas should start being afraid of him.
| 4 | 4 | "Half Deaf Is Better Than All Dead" | Greg Yaitanes | Jonathan Tropper & David Schickler | February 1, 2013 | 0.448 |
Lucas goes back to his old ways and gets trapped inside a state museum he is robbing and ends up having to turn to his old crew - Job and Carrie - for help escaping. Using evidence provided by a white supremacist, Arno, Lucas and Emmet are able to arrest Proctor for the murder of Hanson. While transporting him, they are attacked by the Moody Brothers, who want revenge for Lucas Hood killing their brother. A fight ensues, in which Lucas, Emmet, and Proctor defeat the Moody brothers (Lucas cuts off one of the leaders ears). Carrie keeps reminiscing about her time with Lucas; meanwhile he sleeps with Kat Moody.
| 5 | 5 | "The Kindred" | SJ Clarkson | Jonathan Tropper & David Schickler | February 8, 2013 | 0.445 |
Job moves to Banshee and makes new plans with Lucas. When a member of a motorcycle gang attempts to rape Carrie, Siobhan arrives on scene and kills the man. The motorcycle gang swears vengeance, burning down Siobhan's house and ruining the annual Banshee festival. Proctor helps Lucas locate the gang, but expects something in return. Lucas then beats up the motorcycle gang and has them transported out of Banshee. Meanwhile, an FBI agent comes to Banshee to investigate some missing files.
| 6 | 6 | "Wicks" | OC Madsen | Jonathan Tropper & David Schickler | February 15, 2013 | 0.465 |
A former fellow inmate named Wicks recognizes Lucas. This triggers a series of flashbacks to when Lucas was in prison. When in prison, Lucas had to deal with the advances and assaults of Albino, an inmate who worked for Rabbit. One of the assaults nearly killed Lucas. During a confrontation in front of the entire prison, Lucas violently killed the Albino. In the present, Wicks attempts to blackmail Lucas by threatening to reveal his true identity, but is killed by Sugar and Lucas. In the post credits scene, Lucas receives a voice mail from the son of the real Lucas Hood.
| 7 | 7 | "Behold a Pale Rider" | Dean White | David Schickler | February 22, 2013 | 0.381 |
A drug store robbery turns into a massive hostage situation led by two gunmen, with Carrie's daughter one of the students held at gunpoint. At the same time, Rabbit is on his way to Lucas who has been drugged and handcuffed to a motel bed by Carrie, in her attempt to deliver on her deal with her father. Aided by Job, who tracked his phone, Lucas escapes, goes to the school and kills the gunmen. After the hostage crisis is resolved, Rabbit watches television and recognizes Lucas in a news report. Rabbit sends Olek to Banshee to look for clues about Lucas. Carrie repents, reseduces Lucas and apologizes for her betrayal.
| 8 | 8 | "We Shall Live Forever" | Greg Yaitanes | Jonathan Tropper | March 1, 2013 | 0.476 |
Carrie tells Lucas that Deva is his daughter. Olek, an employee of Rabbit arrives and attempts to capture Carrie, only to be captured by Lucas and Carrie in return. Rebecca is forced to leave her Amish home, prompting her uncle Proctor to confront his Amish family. Benjamin Longshadow dies in a hospital, leaving his son Alex as the tribal chief. Olek manages to break free of his constraints, resulting in a fight with Carrie that lasts for the majority of the episode. Lucas arrives shortly after the fight concludes, with Olek dead and Carrie severely injured.
| 9 | 9 | "Always the Cowboy" | Miguel Sapochnik | Story by : Jonathan Tropper & David Schickler; Teleplay by : Jonathan Tropper | March 8, 2013 | 0.335 |
Carrie is in ICU. Her husband Gordon runs into Lucas and later confronts her with his doubts. Job and Sugar bury Olek's body. Rabbit prepares a large scale action in Banshee. Trying to secure Max, Carrie is too late and sees him being abducted by Rabbit. The FBI agent takes charge of the kidnapping investigation. Lucas and Kai Proctor come to an arrangement after a short fight about Lucas' affair with Rebecca. Proctor also confronts Alex and has the construction of the new casino halted as a display of power. Rabbit introduces himself to his new family, much to the horror of Deva. Later Rabbit confronts Lucas and tells him that this will be the last time they see each other. As soon as Rabbit leaves the building, the sounds of guns being readied could be heard and Lucas ducks in desperation.
| 10 | 10 | "A Mixture of Madness" | Miguel Sapochnik | Story by : Jonathan Tropper & David Schickler; Teleplay by : Jonathan Tropper | March 15, 2013 | 0.455 |
In the past, Lucas gets close to a counselor evaluating his early release. It is eventually revealed that the counselor worked for Rabbit. In the present, Lucas is saved from Rabbit's gunmen by Proctor and Burton. Lucas exchanges himself to Rabbit for Max. Carrie, Sugar, Job and the three deputies go to Rabbit's outpost to save Lucas and a shootout occurs. Sugar and Brock are wounded. Rabbit tortures Lucas and prepares to kill him when Carrie arrives. After a brief exchange of words, Carrie shoots her father. Hurt by Carrie's choice of Lucas over her family, Gordon leaves with the children. An explosion set off by Proctor to send a message to Alex blows up the casino being built and accidentally kills Mayor Dan Kendall who is inside. A small group of hunters come across the remains of the body of the real Lucas Hood. In a post-credits scene, Jason Hood, son of the real Lucas Hood, is shown watching a YouTube video of the fight between Mr. Sanchez and the unnamed protagonist as Lucas Hood.

=== Season 2 (2014) ===
| No. overall | No. in season | Title | Directed by | Written by | Original release date | US viewers (millions) |
|---|---|---|---|---|---|---|
| 11 | 1 | "Little Fish" | Greg Yaitanes | Jonathan Tropper | January 10, 2014 | 0.491 |
Following the events of the first season, Carrie tells Lucas that her first priority is getting her family back and that Lucas needs to disappear before his real identity is discovered. Rebecca is conflicted about leaving her previous life after the revelation that the bomb in the hotel killed the mayor but is reassured by Proctor. Later in the day she watches Proctor having sex with an unknown woman. Job and Sugar break into the morgue to steal the remains of the real Lucas Hood after the shallow grave the body was buried in was discovered. FBI Special Agent Jim Racine arrives in Banshee to conduct a closed federal hearing but it quickly becomes apparent that he is more interested in finding Rabbit. Consequently he is incredibly lenient putting the Sheriff's Department under federal oversight for two years, putting each deputy on probation and not punishing Lucas at all, as he was acting in the capacity of a civilian. Before leaving town, Racine reveals that Xavier will be removed from the case and tells Carrie she will face criminal charges unless she can provide information about her father's whereabouts. Job, Carrie and Lucas in a high-speed car chase, rob the armored truck from the casino but only manage to get away with a small portion of the money because a mysterious motorcyclist (later revealed to be Nola) is able to thwart their plan. George, a member of the Kinaho tribal council, uses this to question Alex's position as chief. Deva is caught shoplifting but escapes any consequences by threatening the security guard with an allegation of sexual assault. Carrie pleads with Gordon to help her with the pending charges but Gordon is resolute. Lucas later meets Nola in Sugar's bar and has sex with her. In the final scene, Racine questions a priest named Yulish connected to Rabbit who Racine alleges is hiding Rabbit whilst the priest implies he has knowledge that Racine has serious health issues.
| 12 | 2 | "The Thunder Man" | Greg Yaitanes | David Schickler | January 17, 2014 | 0.424 |
The rivalry between Proctor and Alex comes to a head as Alex detonates C4 explosive in one of Proctor's cattle trucks and Nola kidnaps Rebecca. Proctor in turn calls in Lucas' favor and has Lucas bring Rebecca back to him alive. Lucas single handedly defeats all of Alex's guards before finding out that Nola was the one to kidnap Rebecca (following Lucas and Nola having had sex the previous night). After Lucas recovers Rebecca, Proctor and Burton approach Alex while he is making love to his wife in his hot tub, and threaten to kill all of his family members and drown him in their blood if he ever touches Rebecca again. While this is going on, Siobhan's violent ex-husband is back in town and pleads with her to remove a pre-existing restraining order so he can take a nearby job offered by his cousin. She complies but is attacked by him shortly after, leading to her brutally beating him over the head with a bible. Meanwhile, Carrie is sentenced to 30 days in prison but has 72 hours to set her affairs in order. After being driven to the prison personally by Lucas (who has painful memories from his experiences in prison), Carrie quickly gets into a violent fight with another inmate. Gordon continues to struggle and is seen in the final scene engaging in sexual activity with an unknown woman in the parking lot of the Gentleman's club, Savoy; as this is going on, Lucas stares at the bloody bible that Siobhan used to beat her husband with and grins.
| 13 | 3 | "The Warrior Class" | OC Madsen | Evan Dunsky | January 24, 2014 | 0.536 |
Lucas visits Carrie who reveals that she received no extra time for the fight although Lucas reinforces the message that she should keep her head down. Rebecca's brother Solomon and Lana Cleary, a young girl from the Kinaho tribe talk of running away together. Later that day, Lana is found dead and Solomon is missing, raising tensions between the Kinaho tribe and the Amish. The Banshee Sheriff's Department is suspicious of Tommy Littlestone who is the ex-boyfriend of Lana. His brother Chayton Littlestone is the leader of the Redbones gang on the reservation which is interested in maintaining the purity of the tribe. The BSD have no jurisdiction on the reservation but Lucas and his deputies enter it anyway in search of Chayton and Tommy. A large brawl ensues with members of the gang resulting in Chayton being detained and transferred as outstanding warrants against him take priority but Tommy is only taken in for questioning briefly as he is a minor. Jason Hood, the son of the real Lucas Hood, reveals himself to Lucas. Jason is happy to stay quiet if Lucas will help him start a new life. The Redbones enter onto Amish land in the hope of intimidating the Amish but Proctor intervenes. Rebecca is attacked by a hooded assailant on the Amish land. Lucas goes after him and suffers a head wound but not before he shoots his unknown attacker in the leg who still manages to escape. The final scenes of the episode show Lucas having sex with Siobhan, Gordon getting a lap dance from a stripper, and Nola standing over the dead body of Lana swearing revenge.
| 14 | 4 | "Bloodlines" | OC Madsen | Evan Dunsky | January 31, 2014 | 0.514 |
Carrie's incarceration continues to torment her which escalates when she receives a visit from Rabbit who is confirmed to still be alive. She continues to try to reach out to Gordon and Deva with little success. Meanwhile the Kinaho tribe has a funeral for Lana where Lucas officially meets Nola. Lucas agrees to let Brock talk to the Amish in the hope that the children can shed some light on Solomon's disappearance. Daniel Moses, a friend of Solomon who escaped the Amish life, reveals that a zealous Amish teacher named Jonah was violent towards both himself and Solomon. Lucas confronts this teacher discovering he has a wound on his leg, identical to that of the unknown attacker from the previous episode. A vicious fight between Jonah and Lucas ensues. It is revealed that Jonah killed Lana and has kidnapped Solomon. Proctor uses torture to find where Jonah is hiding Solomon. Job reluctantly agrees to Lucas' plan to provide Jason with a new identity. Chayton escapes while Siobhan and Emmett are transporting him. The relationship between Proctor and Alex continues to deteriorate resulting in a violent altercation. A peace is made however following the arrest of Jonah but Nola is unhappy with Alex's choice to reconcile with Proctor and kills Jonah before leaving town.
| 15 | 5 | "The Truth About Unicorns" | Babak Najafi | John Romano | February 7, 2014 | 0.591 |
Carrie is released from prison and Lucas takes her to a house he had bought for them fifteen years ago before he had been arrested. While they are there, Racine pays the two a visit and tells Lucas that he knows that he isn't the real Lucas Hood and states that he wants to make a deal with him to bring down Rabbit. Before the conversation could go any further, an assassin sent by Rabbit kills Racine via sniper rifle. The assassin is then killed by Carrie shortly after. Lucas and Carrie then return to Banshee, where Lucas has a heart to heart conversation with Sugar.
| 16 | 6 | "Armies of One" | Babak Najafi | John Romano | February 14, 2014 | 0.550 |
Job goes to New York to cash in the diamonds that Hood went to jail for. An assassin sent by the man who Jason Hood stole from comes to Banshee to capture Jason. Although Hood is seemingly able to bribe the assassin to not harm Jason the assassin captures Jason anyway. Hood ultimately confronts the assassin on a highway, leading to fight which concludes with the assassin being decapitated by an oncoming truck. Hood and Jason return to Banshee and has Jason hide the bribe money inside his motel bathroom. Later that night, Jason has sex with Rebecca Bowman despite Sugar's advise to avoid her, and a jealous Proctor barges in on them and has Burton kill Jason right in front of Rebecca. As Burton cleans up the room, he has a flashback to a time in the past when he was tortured. Although Burton managed to remove all of the blood stains and evidence of foul play, he doesn't take the money out of the bathroom, and doesn't notice the watch the sheriff had taken from the real Lucas Hood and given to Jason. Back in Sugar's bar, a frustrated Job reveals that Mr. Rabbit had played them and crushes the "diamond" with a hammer. Lucas spent fifteen years in prison over a bag of fake diamonds.
| 17 | 7 | "Ways to Bury a Man" | Loni Peristere | Doug Jung | February 21, 2014 | 0.537 |
Hood returns to Jason's motel room and finds it empty with the money still in the bathroom and the Jason's father's watch he'd given him. After receiving a tip from Sugar, Hood rushes to Proctor's house and confronts him. During the confrontation Proctor signals that he had Jason killed, and Hood swears that he'll bring Proctor down. Hood also tells Rebecca that if she gets in his way, he won't hesitate to kill her. Hood, Emmett and Brock confront a trio of skinheads who work for Proctor. They hurl racist slurs at Emmett to distract him, but are forced to reveal the location of one of Proctor's factories. Hood, Sugar, and Job blow up Proctor's factory, much to Brock's shock and amazement. As this is going on, Max has a life-threatening asthma attack while Gordon is drunk in a strip club (Hood was at the strip club too investigating Proctor and ultimately gets into a violent fight with Gordon). Alex Longshadow defeats his rival in an election for tribe leader, due to the help of Proctor.
| 18 | 8 | "Evil for Evil" | Loni Peristere | Doug Jung | February 28, 2014 | 0.503 |
Job manages to pinpoint where Rabbit may be hiding. Hood manages to have Proctor arrested for an illegal arsenal of weapons. Rebecca reveals to Proctor that one of his strippers, Juliette, told Hood about a way to find them. The skinheads that Hood and Emmett confronted in the previous episode attack Emmett's wife and she loses their baby. A distraught Emmett unlocks the doors to their holding cells and beats the three of them, one of whom he violently injures by breaking his sternum with brass knuckles. Hood tells Emmett he did the right thing, but Emmett resigns from the Banshee police force.
| 19 | 9 | "Homecoming" | Greg Yaitanes | Jonathan Tropper | March 7, 2014 | 0.464 |
Job travels to New York and breaks into Rabbit's brother's church. Just before Job can shoot Rabbit, he's captured by Yulish, who is revealed to be Rabbit's brother. Job manages to break free of his restraints and engages Rabbit's men in a shootout before escaping the church and being hit by a car. In Banshee, Proctor is visited by his mother and they have their first heart to heart conversation in years. Burton executes one of the skin heads whom Emmett beat up in the previous episode for betraying Proctor's trust and telling the cops about the meth lab. Burton then attempts to kill Juliette, the stripper that helped Hood arrest Proctor, but Rebecca helps her escape, causing the distrust between Rebecca and Burton to grow. Carrie moves back in with Gordon and their children, and Hood and Siobhan grow closer. While they're together Job phones Hood, telling him he's found Rabbit and is at New York Presbyterian hospital with a concussion. Siobhan is frustrated by Hood's behavior but he just says he's sorry and rushes to Carrie's house to tell her about Job and Rabbit. She tells Gordon she has to leave. Gordon, distraught, holds Hood at gunpoint. Carrie tells Gordon that Hood is Deva's father before departing with him to New York. After managing to rescue Job from assassins sent by Rabbit, Hood and Carrie prepare for an all-out assault against Rabbit and his brother.
| 20 | 10 | "Bullets and Tears" | Greg Yaitanes | Jonathan Tropper | March 14, 2014 | 0.733 |
Numerous flashbacks show the events leading to the diamond robbery and how Rabbit plotted Lucas’s arrest and imprisonment to keep his daughter and Lucas apart. In the present, Lucas obtains an arsenal of weapons from a friend, arms dealer Fat Al. Lucas and Carrie attack the church but are out-gunned by Rabbit's men, They are rescued by the arrival of Job and gunmen led by Fat Al, who kill Rabbit's remaining men. Rabbit's brother Yulish bursts out shooting; Lucas kills him. Lucas and Carrie find Rabbit, sitting alone on a bench behind the church. Demoralised and defeated, he accepts a pistol proffered by Carrie and kills himself. Emmett and his wife leave Banshee, but are followed and gunned down by Mark Sharp’s neo-Nazi friends. Rebecca seduces Alex Longshadow, intending to kill him, and only manages it after a brutal fight. Without Longshadow's evidence, Procter is freed. Rebecca discloses that she killed Alex for him. They have sex. Lucas is just resuming the sheriff’s role when Deva announces that she knows he is her real father. In New Orleans, Chayton Littlestone kills his opponent in an illegal MMA-style fight. He is informed of Longshadow's death and decides to return to Banshee.

=== Season 3 (2015) ===
| No. overall | No. in season | Title | Directed by | Written by | Original release date | US viewers (millions) |
|---|---|---|---|---|---|---|
| 21 | 1 | "The Fire Trials" | Loni Peristere | Jonathan Tropper | January 9, 2015 | 0.547 |
Lucas, Brock and Siobhan corner Hondo, one of the neo-Nazis who gunned down Emmett and his wife. They then proceed to empty their guns into a surprised Hondo who expected to be arrested. Afterwards, Brock proceeds to answer a prowler call, which then turns into a sexual encounter with his ex-wife. Brock hasn't moved on from Emmett's death, and is then shown having a drink at his grave. Anastasia, who is now separated from her husband, is shown to be working in a restaurant, where she assaults a customer for groping her behind. Meanwhile, Chayton returns from the city, back to Kinaho land during the fire trials. Rebecca wakes up in bed with Proctor. Chayton threatens Rebecca outside Proctor's Strip club. Chayton and his men attack a US Marine weapons convoy near Camp Genoa, killing all the marines and getting away with the weapons, in spite of Lucas's intervention. Lucas, along with Sugar and Job, then plot to rob the safe in Camp Genoa. Nola Longshadow is shown to be at the place where Alex died, swearing revenge.
| 22 | 2 | "Snakes and Whatnot" | Loni Peristere | Halley Gross | January 16, 2015 | 0.439 |
The colonel of Camp Genoa appears at Anastasia's new workplace and gives her cunnilingus. A former neo-nazi named Kurt Bunker appears at the Cadi, wanting to sign up as a new deputy. Hood takes a liking to him, but as Billy Raven has been hired, can't offer the job. Proctor and Rebecca meet with rival drug dealers, but Rebecca loses her temper with one after he constantly insults and belittles her, shooting him several times in the legs. Proctor and Burton dispatch the others, leaving Rebecca to execute the one who insulted her and started the incident. Proctor hears that his mother is dying of cancer, and takes her in to his manor. Anastasia breaks off her relationship with the colonel upon learning who he is. Anastasia and Hood recon a tunnel that leads to Camp Genoa while the colonel brutally beats one of his own men for tipping the Redbones about the gun shipment. Chayton sends two of his men to kidnap Proctor and Rebecca, but Burton dispatches both of them. Lotus is shown continuing his affair with his ex-wife. Hood visits the Kinaho reservation in an effort to find those responsible for the disturbance at Proctor's manor, but ends up meeting the local law enforcement, Aimee King and Karl "Yaz" Yazzie. The show ends with Deva visiting Hood, then leaving disappointed as Hood can't explain to her why he cares for her. After she leaves, Hood hears a knock on his door. As he opens it, a gun is cocked but we don't see who is on the other side.
| 23 | 3 | "A Fixer of Sorts" | Magnus Martens | Justin Britt-Gibson | January 23, 2015 | 0.588 |
Nola attacks Proctor's house and starts her attack by throwing an axe right into Burton's shoulder. With a look of death on his face, Burton pulls the axe out of his shoulder and the two engage in a brutal fight. Despite Nola besting Burton at the start of the fight, Burton manages to gain the upper hand and kill Nola, who thinks about Chayton during her last moments. Hood is arrested by FBI Special Agent Robert Phillips (Denis O'Hare), but they are soon kidnapped by Brantley (Shuler Hensley), the man Jason Hood was running from in Season 2. Brantley tortures both Hood and Phillips, demanding the money stolen from him by Jason. Hood eventually escapes and kills Brantley and his men, saving Phillips. Chayton's younger brother Tommy attacks Proctor's striptease bar with several Redbones; the Deputies (Brock, Siobhan and Billy Raven) dispatch the attackers, with Billy Raven reluctantly killing Tommy Littlestone. Meanwhile, Proctor takes his dying mother to his house. At the end of the episode, Phillips reveals to Hood that in order to cover his back, he left an FBI file about Hood at the Banshee Sheriff's Department, leading to Siobhan learning that Hood is an impostor.
| 24 | 4 | "Real Life is the Nightmare" | Magnus Martens | Justin Britt-Gibson | January 30, 2015 | 0.662 |
Siobhan now knows Hood's not who he says he is, and tells Hood he must leave. Gordon cleans up his act, shaving his beard and cleaning his apartment. Carrie has a melt down in the diner, quits her job and goes on a wild spree that see her beating a guy in a bar and taking his motorcycle on a joy ride. Deva steals a game from a video store as a gift for her little brother. Sugar and Job set out to steal access credentials to set up their next job. Rebecca and Burton run the Van carrying Tommy's body off the road, then set it alight killing the Red Bones that were driving it. Hood sets out to kill Proctor as his final act or perhaps even gift to Banshee, but they get broken up by Brock who then arrests Proctor and locks him up in the jail cell. The scene ends with Hood, Siobhan, Brock and the unlikely applicant for the vacant deputy post, Kurt Bunker within the Banshee sheriff's office - with Chayton and his Red Bones brothers outside the building, armed to the teeth, and firing their weapons. Hood tackles Siobhan to prevent her from being hit by the bullets.
| 25 | 5 | "Tribal" | OC Madsen | Adam Targum | February 6, 2015 | 0.583 |
Chayton and the Red Bones begin their all-out assault on the Banshee sheriff's office. Chayton demands Billy and Proctor (who is currently locked up in a jail cell) to be brought outside (and be presumably executed). Chayton's demand is rebuffed and the Sheriff department fortifies the office when the shutters are destroyed by machine gun fire. However, Chayton and the Red Bones use other access routes. In the ensuing struggle, Proctor's lawyer steals cell keys but is shot dead while unlocking Proctor's cell; Bill is shot in the shoulder by Chayton with a bow; and Kurt is severely wounded. Proctor has not left even though he is no longer jailed, and he and Lucas fight together to defend the building. Proctor then leaves saying he will get help, although it is possible he will be shot once outside. Siobhan kills a Red Bone in hand-to-hand combat but is taken by Chayton who puts her in a head lock and snaps her neck in half after taunting Lucas and before leaving. Having lowered his gun, but then failed to save Siobhan, Lucas helplessly holds her body in his arms, but help finally arrives beforehand. After being tended to, Lucas sits outside the police station with a look of revenge on his face.
| 26 | 6 | "We Were All Someone Else Yesterday" | OC Madsen | Adam Targum | February 13, 2015 | 0.610 |
Hood recalls his journey so far and what might have been. Siobhan’s funeral takes place but Hood watches from his car. Proctor’s mother’s funeral takes place, Kai attends but Rebecca remains outside and later rebuffs requests from her family to re-join their community. She appears to take control at the club, but Kai returns and establishes his dominance, Rebecca is not pleased. Job and Carrie continue to plot the robbery of Camp Genoa. The FBI take over the operation to apprehend Chayton. Deva is seen picking a pocket by Charlie Knowles, who invites her to a party at his house, where drugs are shared and they make out. The Feds begin their operation, Lucas appears to stay back. Hood actually gets ahead of the Feds with Job, finds Chayton and attacks him. Another Redbone comes to Littlestone’s aid and brawls with Job, a shot is fired, alerting the Feds. Hood, Job and Chayton run from the camp, Aimee King, of Kinaho PD, also gives chase and catches Chayton. They face one another down but King is unable to fire on the Redbone leader, who prevails and starts to strangle the powerless Aimee. Hood catches up and shoots Littlestone in the shoulder – but Chayton escapes, diving down into a small lake. The episode ends with Hood imagining what Banshee would have been like if he had managed to save the real Hood's life back in the first episode, ending with Hood fantasizing about pleasantly meeting Siobhan before leaving Banshee with Job.
| 27 | 7 | "You Can't Hide from the Dead" | Greg Yaitanes | Chris Kelley | February 20, 2015 | 0.547 |
Hood is losing his grip on reality, seeing Siobhan wherever he looks. Chayton hides out on a ranch and is helped by the widowed owner. He repays that kindness by killing her and her neighbour. Deva is on a downward path with the drop-out Charlie Knowles. Carrie hears about this and she and Gordon go to retrieve their wayward daughter. They fight and humiliate Knowles and leave with Deva. Back at the house Carrie and Gordon have sex in the kitchen before Gordon leaves for his own home. Proctor is connecting with both his father and Emily, the latter much to Burton’s displeasure. Meanwhile Rebecca has struck a deal to supply the Salvadorians. During the heist at Camp Genoa, Hood’s ongoing hallucinations of Siobhan distract him and Job is almost killed as a result. Despite Colonel Stowe managing to take on Carrie, Job, Sugar and Hood in physical combat, the four manage to complete the heist successfully. Hood returns to the Cadi after the heist and learns from Aimee that Chayton is heading to New Orleans. Lucas decides to go to New Orleans to put an end to the murderous Redbone and tells Brock that he is in charge of the Sheriff's department in his absence. Brock declines Lucas' order, and states that he is going to come with him to New Orleans.
| 28 | 8 | "All the Wisdom I Got Left" | Greg Yaitanes | Chris Kelley | February 27, 2015 | 0.588 |
Hood and Brock head to Louisiana in pursuit of Littlestone, they are told his own people sent him away and push on to New Orleans to track him down, not without a little adventure. Burton tracks some surplus revenue to Rebecca and the Salvadorians. He threatens to reveal all to Kai but she suggests Kai would choose his niece over Burton. Job accuses Sugar of taking some of the money. Sugar has given it to Oscar Cruz Jr., the son of a man he crippled in a fight. Job recovers the money and informs Sugar that Cruz Jr has been scamming him. In the Big Easy the pair wait for Chayton to make a move. Hood awakes to find the Redbone standing over him with a knife. The ensuing fight sees both scoring hits with fists, feet and blades. Brock arrives armed and Littlestone leaps from the balcony. Hood tracks Chayton to the deserted port where, with Brock's shotgun, he first blows a hole in Chayton’s side, then as Chayton is saying a final prayer, fires the shotgun and takes off half of Chayton's head, annihilating him in retaliation for Siobhan being killed. The body is cast into the waiting river. Hood says he’s not going back to Banshee, but Brock persuades him to return to take care of Proctor. Kai is re-joining the church of his family when armed men arrive and take him and Emily away. Rebecca fires at the retreating kidnappers’ vehicle to no effect. Stowe recalls the robbery and suspects Carrie may have been involved.
| 29 | 9 | "Even God Doesn't Know What to Make of You" | Loni Peristere | Jennifer Ames & Steve Turner | March 6, 2015 | 0.564 |
Kai is being beaten by the Black Beards, their leader, Frasier, explains that this is his response to Rebecca’s selling to Morales (the Salvadorans). Emily is forced to watch. Hood returns to Banshee but Job is not welcoming after Lucas ‘left him for dead’. Hood recalls how their friendship came about. Rebecca asks Hood for help with Kai, but Hood refuses. She tells Brock that Emily is also captive, he convinces the Sheriff to help. Lucas enlists Job who, as a last favor, locates Proctor and his captors. Hood & Brock rescue Emily but leave Kai to his kidnappers. Leaving the site they meet Rebecca and Burton, but will not help them liberate Proctor. Kai manages to overcome his would-be executioners, and kills them (except for Frasier who escaped), without any help from his niece. He goes to Emily’s home and tells her their relationship is over. Leo uncovers the identity of Sugar, Job and Carrie with Stowe and company rounding them up. Stowe tries to get her to name their accomplice. Deputy Raven arrests Deva, catching her getting high in the park. Gordon refuses to bail her but Hood takes her home against the Mayor’s wishes. At the bar Hood and Gordon find evidence that Stowe has captured the trio.
| 30 | 10 | "We All Pay Eventually" | Loni Peristere | Jennifer Ames & Steve Turner | March 13, 2015 | 0.692 |
Leo interrogates Job, Hood and Gordon launch an all-out assault on Stowe's compound while Proctor, Burton, Rebecca, and the leader of the Salvadorans launch an attack on Frasier and his men. As the assault takes, Hood has flashbacks to when he was trained by a recruiter named Dalton (David Harbour). Gordon is mortally wounded during the assault on Stowe's compound, however he manages to shoot Stowe (who is then stabbed to death by Carrie), before dying in Carrie's arms. Job is also kidnapped by one of Stowe's men at the end of the assault and taken by an unseen person (presumably Dalton). Proctor and his accomplices manage to kill all of Frasier's men, and allows the Salvadoran's leader to cut Frasier's head off. After Gordon's death, Lucas returns to Banshee and announces that he is resigning from his job as sheriff, something that intrigues Proctor.

=== Season 4 (2016) ===
In February 2015, Banshee was renewed for a fourth and final season of 8 episodes. This was two fewer than the 10 episodes in each of the first three seasons. Originally scheduled to premiere on January 29, 2016, the start of the season was delayed to April 1, 2016.

| No. overall | No. in season | Title | Directed by | Written by | Original release date | US viewers (millions) |
|---|---|---|---|---|---|---|
| 31 | 1 | "Something Out of the Bible" | OC Madsen | Jonathan Tropper | April 1, 2016 | 0.356 |
Skipping forward 18 months from the end of Season 3, Hood has resigned as sheriff and lives in seclusion in a cabin in the woods. Brock, now sheriff, locates Hood and reveals to him that Rebecca Bowman has been murdered, the third girl in town ritually eviscerated by a serial killer. Meanwhile, Kai Proctor is now the mayor of Banshee, and has set up a business partnership with Calvin Bunker's gang of neo-Nazis, though there is considerable friction between the two groups. Kurt Bunker is also revealed to be carrying on an affair with Calvin's wife. Carrie has lost custody of Deva and lives alone while secretly meting out vigilante justice against the Bunker-Proctor criminal syndicate by night. Flashbacks reveal that Hood and Carrie's search for Job hit a dead end after tracking down former government agent Dalton, whom Hood murdered.
| 32 | 2 | "The Burden of Beauty" | OC Madsen | Adam Targum | April 8, 2016 | 0.277 |
In flashback, it is shown that Rebecca Bowman maintained contact with Hood after he went off the grid, and set him up in the cabin on Proctor's land. She also attempted to branch away from her uncle's organization and set up a business with a family of meth cooks, but ended up in a violent confrontation with them, during which Hood was wounded while saving her, leaving blood in her car. In the present, Proctor sets up a line of business with the Colombian cartel, and shuts down an illicit porn operation Calvin Bunker ran without his knowledge. When Calvin agrees reluctantly to cut Proctor in on the porn deal and Proctor has the charges against the production dropped, Carrie takes them down in an act of vigilante justice.
| 33 | 3 | "JOB" | Everardo Gout | Liz Sagal | April 15, 2016 | 0.290 |
Job is revealed to have been held in captivity and tortured ceaselessly over the past two years since his capture. With help from Fat Au, Hood and Carrie finally track him down and rescue him from his captors, though he suffers from severe PTSD, and their entire score from Camp Genoa is lost in the process as a ransom payment. Proctor picks up a young girl who reminds him of Rebecca, only to be infuriated by his memories of Rebecca's disloyalty to him and attack the girl. Rebecca's parents demand her body be given to them for burial, and Proctor pushes for the autopsy to be hastened. It is revealed that she was pregnant with Hood's child. After this, along with Hood's blood being found in Rebecca's car, Hood is arrested. Shortly after this, the serial killer strikes again.
| 34 | 4 | "Innocent Might Be a Bit of a Stretch" | Everardo Gout | Chad Feehan | April 22, 2016 | 0.355 |
With Hood in prison under suspicion of the serial murders, Proctor arrives, intending to murder him. This results in a standoff with Brock which is interrupted by the arrival of FBI agent Veronica Dawson, who takes over the serial killer case, immediately dismissing Hood as a suspect. This is supported when the fourth victim is discovered. Randall Watts, Calvin Bunker's father in law and the real boss of the white supremacists, is released from jail and takes over again, despite Calvin's misgivings. Job moves in with Carrie. Unable to stand the prospect of being left alone at night, he demands to join her on a vigilante outing. This time she single-handedly torches a distribution center run by the white supremacists.
| 35 | 5 | "A Little Late to Grow a Pair" | Loni Peristere | Liz Sagal | April 29, 2016 | 0.390 |
Proctor burns down the hunting cabin Hood was living in. Proctor then tasks Hood with catching the man who killed Rebecca and delivering him into Proctor's hands. Proctor meets with the white supremacist leadership (Randall Watts & Calvin Bunker). In order to prove that the white supremacists will now be much more tightly run with Watts at the helm, Bunker is forced to gruesomely kill the man who was in charge the night that Carrie burned the distribution center down. With the Cartel now involved with Proctor, Watts demands a "piece" of the drugs business; Proctor assures him that they can come to an arrangement. Hood returns to Siobhan Kelly's old mobile home to live. Hood visits Job at Carrie's new home, and they have a heart to heart talk. Job informs Hood of Carrie's vendetta against the criminals. Job then shaves his beard and hair, returning to his "classic" look. Watts visits Kurt Bunker and tries to convince him to rejoin the Aryan Brotherhood. Kurt responds by vowing to send Watts back to prison. At a Neo-Nazi rally, Kurt hides in the distance and takes aim at Watts with a sniper rifle; he is stopped from shooting by Brock who persuades him to take Watts down via policing. After the rally, Watts insults Calvin in his home. Calvin responds by stabbing Watts in the back of the neck with an ice-pick. He then starts to dismember Watts's body with an electric saw.
| 36 | 6 | "Only One Way a Dogfight Ends" | Jonathan Tropper | Chad Feehan | May 6, 2016 | 0.425 |
One of the serial killer's acolytes walks into the Banshee Sheriff's office, douses herself in gasoline, and immolates herself in front of Brock, Bunker, and all other deputies. Job hears someone breaking into Carrie's house; the intruder is revealed to be Deva. Calvin Bunker violently rapes Maggie. Maggie leaves home with her son, and seeks help from Kurt. Maggie reveals to Kurt that she believes that Calvin murdered Watts. Brock offers Maggie and her son a place to stay in his home until Calvin is taken down. Following a lead, Hood and Dawson visit a back-alley surgeon, Dr. David Quick, to try and find the serial killer, as he is known to have "horn" implants on his forehead. At a fetish bar, the owner identifies a photograph that Hood has. The name of the killer is Declan Bode. Brock is attacked by Bode in an alley next to the Sheriff's office. Bode intimidates Brock, but does not kill him. Proctor is informed by his mole in the BSD that Carrie is the person who is attacking his operation; he tries to intimidate Carrie into stopping. Proctor buries Rebecca in a clearing in the woods. Proctor sends a hit team, led by Deputy Cruz, to Carrie's house. Carrie, Job, and Deva repel the attack, with only Cruz escaping alive; Deva is traumatised at having killed a man. Calvin arrives at Proctor's office. He shows Proctor Watts's severed head, and tells Proctor that he is taking over Proctor's empire. Calvin confronts Kurt, seeking the whereabouts of Maggie and his son; Calvin confirms to Kurt that Watts is dead. Following up a lead, Agent Dawson travels to the home of Kim Newton; Newton is actually an acolyte of Bode, and Dawson is captured by Bode.
| 37 | 7 | "Truths Other Than the Ones You Tell Yourself" | OC Madsen | Adam Targum | May 13, 2016 | 0.424 |
Burton murders Deputy Cruz with a knife as she takes a shower. Proctor and Burton discover that Calvin Bunker and the Neo-Nazis have stolen his entire supply of drugs. Burton attacks the Neo-Nazi HQ single-handed, and kills or maims many of them in an effort to recover the stolen drugs. Kurt suggests to Maggie that she flee to Florida to evade Calvin, but Maggie insists she and her son will not be safe as long as Calvin is alive. Calvin's rage explodes while he is at work, and he savagely attacks his boss. The Banshee Sheriffs and Hood start to search for Agent Dawson. Job hacks cell phone records and gets them Kim Newton's address. Dawson escapes the ropes in Bode's dungeon, but is quickly overpowered by Bode. Hood and Brock arrive at the address they found for Kim Newton, but it is not the address that contains Bode's dungeon. In a garage at the address, Hood and Brock find Dawson's car. Brock and Hood are then attacked and knocked unconscious by Dr. David Quick, the back-alley plastic surgeon. Hood and Brock awaken captive in a basement; believing they are about to die, Brock antagonises Hood into telling his story. Hood tells Brock the truth of who he is, and of why he came to Banshee. Before Hood can reveal his real name, Bode and Quick return. Quick is revealed to be a Satanist, and prepares to perform surgery upon Brock and Hood. Brock kicks Quick, who falls in range of Hood. Hood, despite being handcuffed to a pipe, manages to strangle Dr. Quick using his legs. Hood and Brock then defeat the acolytes. Hood bludgeons Bode to a pulp, before Agent Dawson shoots Bode, killing him. Proctor arrives and is informed that Bode was the man who killed Rebecca; Proctor thanks Hood and Brock for their actions. Proctor visits Washington D.C., and meets with a powerful politician, Senator Mitchum. Proctor informs Mitchum that he is having "personnel issues" in Banshee. Carrie intimidates the new D.A. into giving her information; the Cartel leader is flying into Banshee to meet with Proctor. Job tracks down Leo Fitzpatrick, the man who kidnapped him. Job has drained all of Leo's accounts and has stolen all of his assets. Job has also framed Leo for all of his previous crimes and hacks; Leo is now a hunted man.
| 38 | 8 | "Requiem" | OC Madsen | Jonathan Tropper | May 20, 2016 | 0.500 |
Calvin Bunker brings a large posse of men to Proctor's house, and threatens to kill him, but Senator Mitchum, a secret leader of the Brotherhood, emerges from the house, removes Calvin from authority, and sends the men away. Agent Dawson interrogates Bode's wife about the murder of Rebecca Bowman, and concludes that Rebecca's killer is still free, as her murder falls outside of the cultists' established pattern. Upon arrival at Proctor's house and finding no one home, Hood and Dawson find a hidden basement in his toolshed, where they find bloodstained instruments of torture. Hood also finds Rebecca's necklace, and concludes that Proctor must have killed her. He does not reveal this to Dawson, and leaves without her. Meanwhile, Proctor and his aide, Burton, are carrying out their drug deal with Emilio Loera of the Colombian cartel, when they are surprised by Carrie and Job, who have slaughtered Proctor's men in order to undermine the cartel's confidence in him. As they try to leave, the Colombians attempt to kill them, but Brock destroys the truck full of drugs with an RPG, giving Carrie and Job a chance to escape. Loera attempts to shoot Proctor, but Proctor kills him first. Burton executes the remaining cartel henchmen. As they drive away, Hood T-bones their vehicle, sending them into a ravine. Hood confronts Proctor about his involvement in Rebecca's death, upon-which Burton reveals himself as Rebecca's murderer, shocking Proctor. Hood and Burton face off, resulting in Burton nearly strangling him to death, but Hood ultimately prevails. Hood leaves a bloodied and crippled Burton for Proctor to finish off. Burton tells Proctor that he murdered Rebecca for Proctor's benefit, and apologizes. Proctor kills Burton and wails. At Brock's cabin, Calvin confronts Kurt, who attempts to subdue him in a fistfight, but is finally compelled to shoot him dead, having realised it was the only way that Calvin's wife and son would ever be safe. Brock later forgives him this transgression, assuring him that this is how policing must be done in Banshee. Hood tells Dawson about Burton's guilt and subsequent demise. She departs to Washington, inviting him to look her up, and leaves him with a dossier that reveals that she had discovered his real identity. Knowing his luck has run out, and his empire has fallen, Proctor is last seen hopelessly opening fire upon six cartel hitmen who have come for him. After an emotional farewell with Carrie, Hood shares a last round with Sugar and Job at the Forge. Job gives Sugar a parting gift of a satchel full of cash, then leaves for New York. Hood and Sugar both leave for points unknown.

== Banshee Origins webisodes ==
=== Season 1 (2013) ===
| No. overall | No. in season | Title | Directed by | Written by | Original release date |
|---|---|---|---|---|---|
| 1 | 1 | "Olek Drops the Dime" | Greg Yaitanes | David Schickler & Jonathan Tropper | January 11, 2013 |
| 2 | 2 | "A Thief, Not a Killer" | Miguel Sapochnik | David Schickler & Jonathan Tropper | January 11, 2013 |
| 3 | 3 | "Carrie at the Gate" | Miguel Sapochnik | David Schickler & Jonathan Tropper | January 11, 2013 |
| 4 | 4 | "Looking for My Exit" | Greg Yaitanes | David Schickler & Jonathan Tropper | January 11, 2013 |
| 5 | 5 | "Sugar's Release" | Greg Yaitanes | David Schickler & Jonathan Tropper | January 11, 2013 |
| 6 | 6 | "The Forge" | Greg Yaitanes | David Schickler & Jonathan Tropper | January 11, 2013 |
| 7 | 7 | "Siobhan Interrupted" | Greg Yaitanes | David Schickler & Jonathan Tropper | January 11, 2013 |
| 8 | 8 | "Kings and Pawns" | Greg Yaitanes | David Schickler & Jonathan Tropper | January 11, 2013 |
| 9 | 9 | "Checking In" | Greg Yaitanes | David Schickler & Jonathan Tropper | January 11, 2013 |
| 10 | 10 | "The Women" | Greg Yaitanes | David Schickler & Jonathan Tropper | January 11, 2013 |
| 11 | 11 | "Carrie and Deva" | Greg Yaitanes | David Schickler & Jonathan Tropper | January 11, 2013 |
| 12 | 12 | "Passed Over" | Greg Yaitanes | David Schickler & Jonathan Tropper | January 11, 2013 |
| 13 | 13 | "The Real Lucas Hood" | Greg Yaitanes | David Schickler & Jonathan Tropper | January 11, 2013 |

=== Season 2 (2014) ===
| No. overall | No. in season | Title | Directed by | Written by | Original release date |
|---|---|---|---|---|---|
| 14 | 1 | "Hotwire" | Greg Yaitanes | Jonathan Tropper | January 10, 2014 |
| 15 | 2 | "Allenwood Part 1" | OC Madsen | Julian Higgins | January 10, 2014 |
| 16 | 3 | "Interrogation Part 1" | Greg Yaitanes | Jonathan Tropper | January 10, 2014 |
| 17 | 4 | "Interrogation Part 2" | Greg Yaitanes | Jonathan Tropper | January 10, 2014 |
| 18 | 5 | "Interrogation Part 3" | Greg Yaitanes | Jonathan Tropper | January 10, 2014 |
| 19 | 6 | "The Phone Call" | Greg Yaitanes | David Schickler & Jonathan Tropper | January 10, 2014 |
| 20 | 7 | "The Diner" | Babak Najafi | Chris Yakaitis | January 10, 2014 |
| 21 | 8 | "The Person You Were Meant to Be" | Carey Williams | Jonathan Tropper | January 10, 2014 |
| 22 | 9 | "Allenwood Part 2" | OC Madsen | Julian Higgins | January 10, 2014 |
| 23 | 10 | "Brothers" | Greg Yaitanes | Jonathan Tropper | January 10, 2014 |
| 24 | 11 | "The Priest" | Greg Yaitanes | Jonathan Tropper | January 10, 2014 |
| 25 | 12 | "The Field" | Patia Prouty | Jonathan Tropper | January 10, 2014 |

=== Season 3 (2014) ===
| No. overall | No. in season | Title | Directed by | Written by | Original release date |
|---|---|---|---|---|---|
| 26 | 1 | "Getting to Know You" | Greg Yaitanes | Jonathan Tropper | December 20, 2014 |
| 27 | 2 | "Takeover" | Patia Prouty | Chris Yakaitis | December 20, 2014 |
| 28 | 3 | "Always Be Prepared" | Greg Yaitanes | Jennifer Ames & Steve Turner | December 20, 2014 |
| 29 | 4 | "Busy Night" | Loni Peristere | Christopher Kelly | December 20, 2014 |
| 30 | 5 | "Bugs and Thugs" | Marcus Young | Jonathan Tropper | December 20, 2014 |
| 31 | 6 | "Already Dead" | Loni Peristere | Adam Targum | December 20, 2014 |
| 32 | 7 | "Off Duty" | Patia Prouty | Adam Targum | December 20, 2014 |
| 33 | 8 | "Birthday" | Greg Yaitanes | Adam Targum | December 20, 2014 |

=== Banshee Origins Saga (2015) ===
A two-part feature film titled Banshee Origins Saga was released on March 15, 2015. It includes a selection of footage from the first 33 episodes of the webseries.

=== Season 4 (2016) ===
| No. overall | No. in season | Title | Directed by | Written by | Original release date |
|---|---|---|---|---|---|
| 34 | 1 | "Comfort" | Adam Targum | Ashley O'Neil | April 1, 2016 |
| 35 | 2 | "Aeschylus" | Chad Feehan | Conor Patrick Hogan | April 1, 2016 |
| 36 | 3 | "Promise" | Matthew Rauch | Matthew Rauch | April 1, 2016 |
| 37 | 4 | "Cronus" | Chad Feehan | Chad Feehan | April 1, 2016 |
| 38 | 5 | "Hope" | Matthew Rauch | Matthew Rauch | April 1, 2016 |
| 39 | 6 | "Escape" | Adam Targum | Matthew Rauch | April 1, 2016 |
| 40 | 7 | "Drown" | Adam Targum | Matthew Rauch | April 1, 2016 |
| 41 | 8 | "Requiem" | Adam Targum | Chad Feehan | April 1, 2016 |

== Ratings ==
Banshee : U.S. viewers per episode (thousands)

| Season | Episode number | | | | | | | | | | Average |
| Season | 1 | 2 | 3 | 4 | 5 | 6 | 7 | 8 | 9 | 10 | Average |
|---|---|---|---|---|---|---|---|---|---|---|---|
| 1 | 483 | TBD | 405 | 448 | 445 | 465 | 381 | 476 | 335 | 455 | 432 |
| 2 | 491 | 424 | 536 | 514 | 591 | 550 | 537 | 503 | 464 | 733 | 530 |
| 3 | 547 | 439 | 588 | 662 | 583 | 610 | 547 | 588 | 564 | 692 | 582 |
| 4 | 356 | 277 | 290 | 355 | 390 | 425 | 424 | 500 | – | | 377 |

Audience measurement performed by Nielsen Media Research (Note: The viewership statistics in the graph and table are sourced from the citations in the season-specific tables above.)
