= Loni Peristere =

American film director

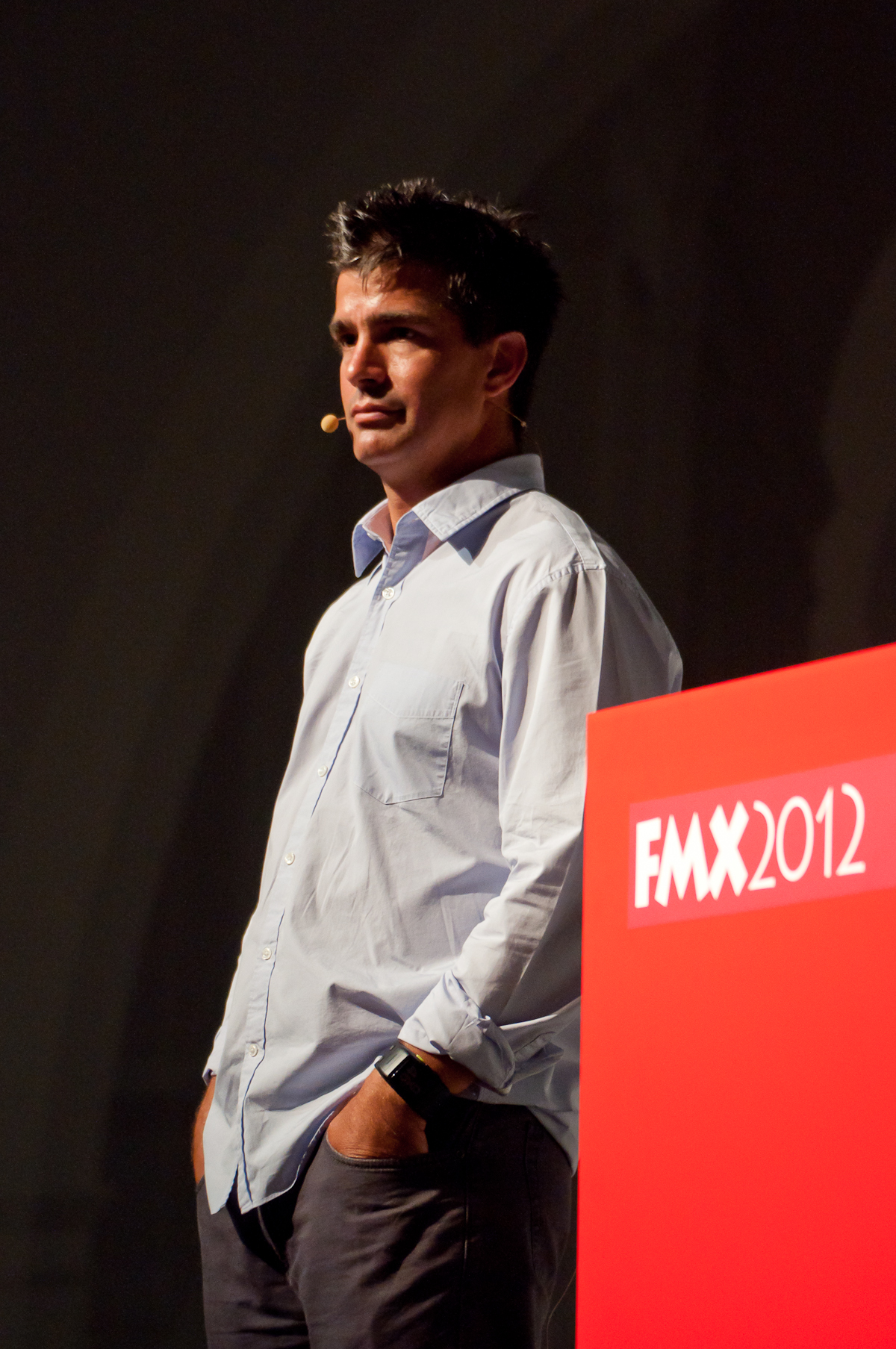
- Peristere in 2012
- Born: April 21, 1971 (age 55); Boston, Massachusetts, U.S.
- Other name: Loni Peristrere
- Occupations: Television director, producer, visual effects supervisor
- Years active: 1997–present
- Spouse: Juliette Peristere

Loni Peristere (/ˈpɛrɪˌstɪr/) is an American television director, producer, and former visual effects supervisor.

He is known for his work in television shows such as the Cinemax action drama Banshee, the FX anthology series American Horror Story, and the Cinemax-HBO Max historical martial arts drama Warrior. He is a director and executive producer on the fantasy drama House of the Dragon.

== Career ==
He began his career as a visual effects coordinator for the 1997 Tommy Lee Jones starrer Volcano. He worked in the department on future films, such as Cinderella, Serenity, Beyond, and One Day Like Rain. He worked in special effects for TV series Buffy the Vampire Slayer, Angel, Firefly (for which he won an Emmy), and Drive.

In 2014, Peristere directed and produced multiple episodes of Cinemax's Banshee. That same year he began directing for FX's American Horror Story. As a director and producer on HBO's House of the Dragon, he led the "Red Sowing" dragon sequence from the episode of the same name.

He is the co-founder of visual effects studio Zoic Studios.

== Filmography ==
=== Direction ===
Television
| Title | Season | Episode name | Episode # | Date | Contribution | Notes |
|---|---|---|---|---|---|---|
| Banshee | Season 2 | "Ways to Bury a Man" | 7 | February 21, 2014 | Director | |
| Banshee | Season 2 | "Evil for Evil" | 8 | February 28, 2014 | Director | |
| Banshee | Season 3 | "The Fire Trials" | 1 | January 9, 2015 | Director, co-executive producer | |
| Banshee | Season 3 | "Snakes and Whatnot" | 2 | January 16, 2015 | Director, co-executive producer | |
| Banshee | Season 3 | "Even God Doesn't Know What to Make of You" | 9 | March 6, 2015 | Director, co-executive producer | |
| Banshee | Season 3 | "We All Pay Eventually" | 10 | March 13, 2015 | Director, co-executive producer | |
| Banshee | Season 4 | "A Little Late to Grow a Pair" | 5 | April 29, 2016 | Director, co-executive producer | |
| American Horror Story | Freak Show | "Tupperware Party Massacre" | 9 | December 10, 2014 | Director | |
| American Horror Story | Freak Show | "Show Stoppers" | 12 | January 14, 2015 | Director | |
| American Horror Story | Hotel | "Devil's Night" | 4 | October 28, 2015 | Director | |
| American Horror Story | Hotel | "Room 33" | 6 | November 11, 2015 | Director | |
| American Horror Story | Hotel | "The Ten Commandments Killer" | 8 | December 2, 2015 | Director | |
| American Horror Story | Apocalypse | "Forbidden Fruit" | 3 | September 26, 2018 | Director | |
| American Horror Story | 1984 | "Episode 100" | 6 | October 23, 2019 | Director | |
| American Horror Story | Double Feature | "Pale" | 2 | September 1, 2021 | Director | |
| American Horror Story | Double Feature | "Thirst" | 3 | September 8, 2021 | Director | |
| Outcast | Season 1 | "This Little Light" | 10 | August 16, 2016 | Director | |
| Outcast | Season 2 | "The Day After That" | 2 | April 10, 2017 | Director | |
| Outcast | Season 2 | "To The Sea" | 10 | June 5, 2017 | Director | |
| Code Black | Season 2 | "Second Year" | 1 | September 28, 2016 | Director | |
| Scream Queens | Season 2 | "Halloween Blues" | 4 | October 18, 2016 | Director | |
| Queen of the South | Season 2 | "Que Manden los Payasos" | 10 | August 10, 2017 | Director | |
| A Series of Unfortunate Events | Season 2 | "The Carnivorous Carnival, Part One" | 9 | March 30, 2018 | Director | |
| A Series of Unfortunate Events | Season 2 | "The Carnivorous Carnival, Part Two" | 10 | March 30, 2018 | Director | |
| 9-1–1 | Season 2 | "Haunted" | 7 | October 29, 2018 | Director | |
| Warrior | Season 1 | "There's No China in the Bible" | 2 | April 12, 2019 | Director | |
| Warrior | Season 1 | "John Chinaman" | 3 | April 19, 2019 | Director | |
| Warrior | Season 1 | "Chinese Boxing" | 9 | May 31, 2019 | Director | |
| Warrior | Season 1 | "If You’re Going to Bow, Bow Low" | 10 | June 7, 2019 | Director | |
| Warrior | Season 2 | If You Don't See Blood, You Don't Come to Play" | 4 | October 23, 2020 | Director | |
| Warrior | Season 2 | "Not For a Drink, a F*ck or a G**damn Prayer" | 5 | October 30, 2020 | Director | |
| Warrior | Season 3 | "All of Death is Going Home" | 9 | August 3, 2023 | Director | |
| Warrior | Season 3 | "A Window of F*cking Opportunity" | 10 | August 10, 2023 | Director | |
| Castle Rock | Season 2 | "The Word" | 7 | November 20, 2019 | Director | |
| Truth Be Told | Season 1 | "Live Thru This" | 7 | January 3, 2020 | Director | |
| Project Blue Book | Season 2 | "Operation Mainbrace" | 20 | March 24, 2020 | Director | |
| American Horror Stories | Season 1 | "Rubber (Wo)Man Part One" | 1 | July 15, 2021 | Director | |
| American Horror Stories | Season 1 | "Rubber (Wo)Man Part Two" | 2 | July 15, 2021 | Director | |
| American Horror Stories | Season 2 | "Dollhouse" | 1 | July 21, 2022 | Director | |
| The Witcher | Season 3 | "The Art of Illusion" | 5 | June 29, 2023 | Director | |
| The Witcher | Season 3 | "Everyone Has a Plan 'Til They Get Punched in the Face" | 6 | July 27, 2023 | Director | |
| House of the Dragon | Season 2 | "The Red Sowing" | 7 | July 28, 2024 | Director | |
| House of the Dragon | Season 3 | "Salt and Sea, Fire and Blood" | 1 | June 21, 2026 | Director | |
| House of the Dragon | Season 3 | "Faceless Men" | 6 | July 26, 2026 | Director | |
