= Room 33 =

- American Horror Story episode
- Episode no.: Season 5 Episode 6
- Directed by: Loni Peristere
- Written by: John J. Gray
- Production code: 5ATS06
- Original air date: November 11, 2015
- Running time: 52 minutes

Guest appearances
- Finn Wittrock as Tristan Duffy; Mare Winningham as Hazel Evers; Richard T. Jones as Detective Hahn; Matt Ross as Dr. Charles Montgomery; Darren Criss as Justin; Helena Mattsson as Agnetha; Shree Crooks as Scarlett Lowe; Kamilla Alnes as Vendela; Charles Melton as Mr. Wu; Lennon Henry as Holden Lowe; Lyric Lennon as Lachlan Drake

Episode chronology
← Previous "Room Service"	Next → "Flicker"
- American Horror Story: Hotel

"Room 33" is the sixth episode of the fifth season of the anthology television series American Horror Story. It aired on November 11, 2015, on the cable network FX. This episode was written by John J. Gray and directed by Loni Peristere.

== Plot ==
In a flashback to 1926, Countess Elizabeth goes to the Murder House to visit Dr. Charles Montgomery, revealing that she is three weeks pregnant. During the process, the baby attacks the nurse assisting Charles with the operation. When Elizabeth wakes up, he announces she had a boy. Later, it is revealed that The Countess keeps him in Room 33.

In present day, John Lowe finds Alex Lowe and Holden in a coffin and faints upon seeing them.

Ramona says she plans to kill the vampire children; Donovan backs out and goes to the penthouse to see Elizabeth. Ramona goes to Room 33 to kill the baby, named Bartholomew, but it attacks her and escapes.

Upstairs, Donovan sees Agnetha and Vendela, the two Swedish tourists, who ask him the way out. Donovan explains that until they find a purpose, they will stay trapped. In order to find purpose, Agnetha and Vendela kill a guest, but are disappointed. Alex finds them beside the dead man and tells them to haunt Lowe. The girls seduce Lowe and scare him, covering him with blood.

Liz reveals to the Countess that she and Tristan have been carrying on an affair for a few weeks. Elizabeth says that she does not share. Liz pleads her case again and Elizabeth says they will talk it over. Tristan greets Elizabeth in Liz's room, and she asks the two lovers to sit while she pours them each a drink. She says that she does not enjoy betrayal and slices Tristan's throat.

== Reception ==
=== Ratings ===
"Room 33" was watched by 2.64 million people during its original broadcast, and gained a 1.4 ratings share among adults aged 18–49. It also ranked second in the Nielsen Social ratings, with 100,000 tweets seen by over 1.36 million people.

=== Critical reception ===
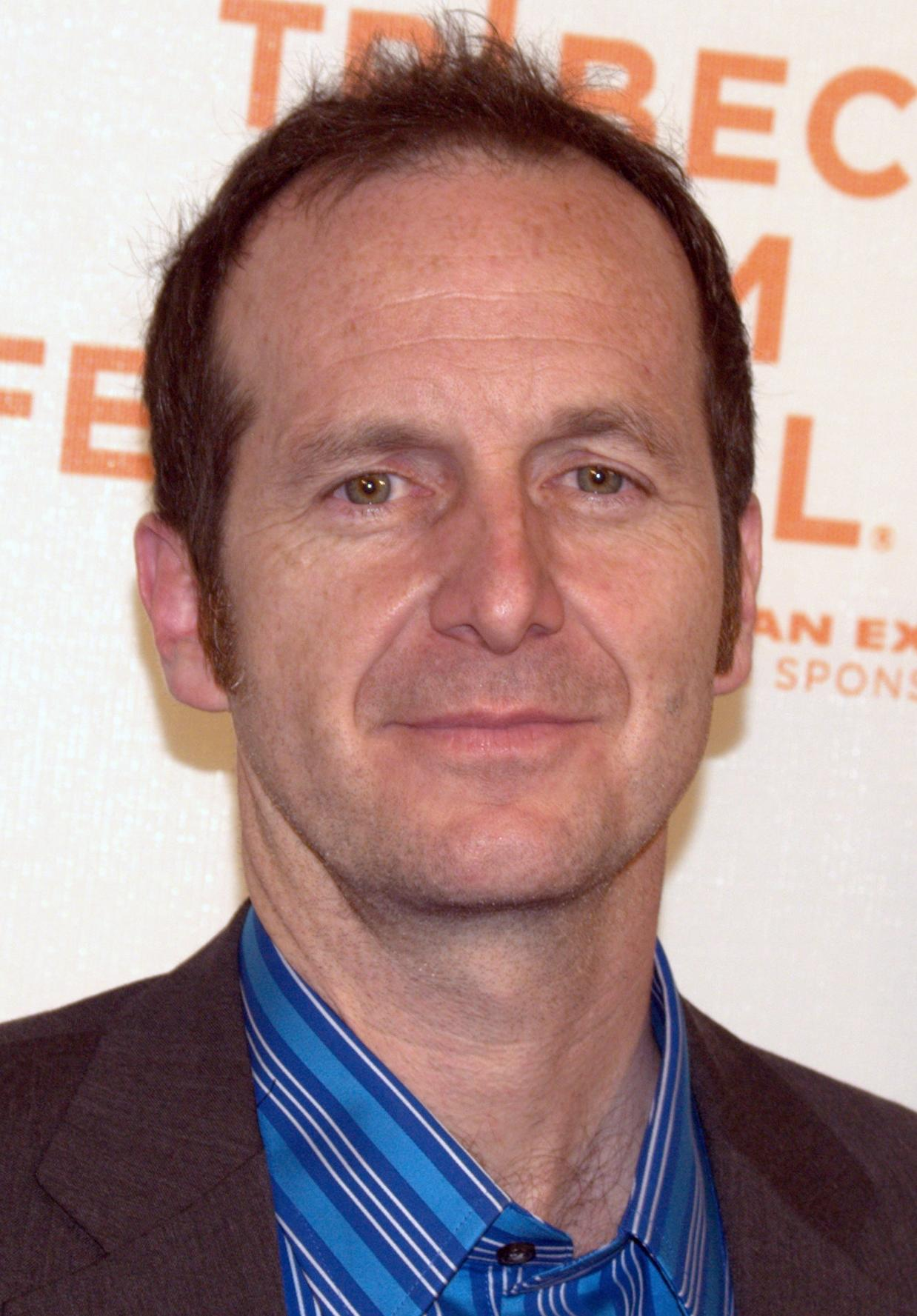
Denis O'Hare's portrayal of Liz Taylor received unanimous appreciation from critics

The episode received mostly favorable reviews from critics, earning a 67% approval rating based on 12 reviews, with an average score of 6.6/10, on review aggregator Rotten Tomatoes. As of May 2020, there is no critical consensus on the site. Alex Stedman from Variety complimented the episode, saying, "Ryan Murphy and Co. have said from the beginning that if any American Horror Story season resembles Hotel, it's season one, Murder House. But episode six made that connection much more literal by bringing the Countess straight to the place that's going to seem very familiar to fans." Writing for The A.V. Club, Emily L. Stephens said that the episode "manages something genuinely surprising: it propels the story forward with nimble efficiency, ties together several of the season's flopping loose ends, circles back into the show's history, and creates some tension along the way even as it acknowledges the ceaseless tedium created by its no-stakes cycle of death and resurrection." The acting in the episode was also received favorably by Michele Calia from The Wall Street Journal. Den of Geek's Ron Hogan praised director Loni Peristere, and the scene about Elizabeth's baby and its portrayal, as well as comparing the filming with that of The Evil Dead. He also noted that the episode was "heavy on terrifying elements, from the monster baby stalking the hotel to the concerted efforts to turn Lowe into a complete mental case, orchestrated by his wife Alex." Lacy Baugher from The Baltimore Sun was impressed by O'Hare's acting in the episode, saying, "Once again, [he] completely stole the show, but the most important thing that happened – as far as longtime fans are concerned – has to be that opening sequence, and all the interesting inter-series connections it brought up."

Entertainment Monthly' Jacqueline Gualteri had a mixed response, writing, "Many of the main characters this season are somewhat stale and just there for a shock. Finally, Lady Gaga has given a bit of life to the blood-thirsty, drug-using, orgy-loving Countess. She has started to develop more of a personality. But the major lesson the evening is that Denis O'Hare has so far been short-changed by American Horror Story. He is one of the most talented actors on the show and deserves far more screen time. Right now, just standing around to be a voice of reason every now and again is wasting his incredible ability." NewNowNext's Erin Shorey complimented the connection to Murder House, while criticizing the character of John Lowe as well as Bentley's acting. A similar thought was shared by Brian Moylan from Vulture, saying, "There is nothing at all I find interesting about John Lowe. Not one single thing. If you took all of his parts out of this season I think it would be absolutely perfect". He added in the end of the review that "as a whole, this season is continuing to shape up nicely. Even the seemingly random bits are serving a larger whole. Think of the Swedes, who were brought back not just to show that they were trapped in the hotel, but also to drive the main story between John and Chloë Sevigny." Writing for The New York Times, E.A. Hanks criticized the gore and violence portrayal without any context, as well as Liz Taylor and Tristan's love story, feeling that it was inadequate and compared it unfavorably to previous season's love stories. He asked, "What is Hotel really about? For a show with a whole lot of innards, this one has yet to show its guts".
