= The Ten Commandments Killer =

- American Horror Story episode
- Episode no.: Season 5 Episode 8
- Directed by: Loni Peristere
- Written by: Ryan Murphy
- Production code: 5ATS08
- Original air date: December 2, 2015
- Running time: 46 minutes

Guest appearances
- Mare Winningham as Hazel Evers; Richard T. Jones as Detective Andy Hahn; Lennon Henry as Holden Lowe

Episode chronology
← Previous "Flicker"	Next → "She Wants Revenge"
- American Horror Story: Hotel

"The Ten Commandments Killer" is the eighth episode of the fifth season of the anthology television series American Horror Story. It aired on December 2, 2015, on the cable network FX. This episode was written by Ryan Murphy and directed by Loni Peristere.

== Plot ==
Det. John Lowe recalls seeing Wren in a glass coffin in Hotel Cortez. He returns there and demands to know the truth from Liz Taylor. Sally leads him to Room 64 to find answers. There, behind the armoire, John finds the preserved body parts from the victims of the Ten Commandments Killer. Sally convinces John that he is the new Ten Commandment Killer, following the path set by James March. John goes to the hospital and meets Hahn. He confesses to being the Ten Commandment Killer and has regained his memories. He had first visited Cortez in 2010, where Donovan had taken him to March's dinner party with Elizabeth. March was so impressed by John that he sent Elizabeth away to spend quality time with him. Once John passed out, March discussed John's potential as a protege with Elizabeth. She agreed to abduct Holden to prepare John for his destiny with March.

In the aftermath of Holden's disappearance, John frequently visits the Hotel to meet March and to continue an ongoing sexual relationship with Sally. During one visit, March shows John his trophy room. To satiate his hunger for injustice, March suggests a target to John: Martin Gamboa, who checked in and molested a ten-year-old boy, and Sally provides the next target to John: an adulterous couple who had checked in the Cortez. March also explains to him that the Cortez cannot be linked to the crimes, so John set up the lovers to stage their murder elsewhere. Hahn drapes the sheet over Wren's corpse, unwilling to believe that his partner is the killer. John says that Hahn is wrong, and stabs him with an autopsy tool with an admonition not to covet his neighbor's wife; John had confirmed that Hahn had been lusting after Alex Lowe.

Returning to the Hotel, John encounters Iris, and tells her he remembers everything. She then is relieved. Then he demands the key to Room 64. Inside, he and March place Hahn's severed penis and testicles in the trophy case.

== Reception ==
"The Ten Commandments Killer" was watched by 2.31 million people during its original broadcast, and gained a 1.2 ratings share among adults aged 18–49. It also ranked third in the Nielsen Social ratings, with 93,000 tweets seen by over 1.01 million people.

The episode received mostly negative reviews from critics, earning a 36% approval rating based on 14 reviews, with an average score of 5/10, on review aggregator Rotten Tomatoes. The site has no critical consensus as of May 2020.
