= This Is Where I Leave You =

2014 film by Shawn Levy

- Theatrical release poster
- Directed by: Shawn Levy
- Screenplay by: Jonathan Tropper
- Based on: This Is Where I Leave You by Jonathan Tropper
- Produced by: Shawn Levy; Paula Weinstein; Jeffrey Levine
- Starring: Jason Bateman; Tina Fey; Adam Driver; Rose Byrne; Corey Stoll; Kathryn Hahn; Connie Britton; Timothy Olyphant; Dax Shepard; Jane Fonda
- Cinematography: Terry Stacey
- Edited by: Dean Zimmerman
- Music by: Michael Giacchino
- Production companies: RatPac-Dune Entertainment; Spring Creek Productions; 21 Laps Entertainment
- Distributed by: Warner Bros. Pictures
- Release date: September 19, 2014
- Running time: 103 minutes
- Country: United States
- Language: English
- Budget: $19.8 million
- Box office: $41.3 million

This Is Where I Leave You is a 2014 American comedy drama film directed by Shawn Levy, and starring Jason Bateman, Tina Fey, Adam Driver, Rose Byrne, Corey Stoll, Kathryn Hahn, Connie Britton, Timothy Olyphant, Dax Shepard and Jane Fonda. It is based on the 2009 novel of the same title by Jonathan Tropper, who also wrote the film's screenplay. This film tells the story of four grown siblings (Bateman, Fey, Stoll and Driver) who are forced to return to their childhood home after their father's death and live under the same roof for seven days, along with their over-sharing mother and an assortment of spouses, exes, and might-have-beens. The film was released by Warner Bros. Pictures on September 19, 2014, receiving mixed reviews from critics and grossed $41.3 million against a $19.8 million production budget.

== Plot ==
New York radio producer Judd Altman discovers his wife Quinn is having an affair with his boss, shock jock Wade Beaufort, when, while bringing her a birthday cake, he walks in on the two of them having sex. As he prepares to divorce her, Judd learns that his father, Mort, has died – so he returns to upstate New York for the funeral, reuniting with his family. Judd's sister Wendy and her children are being neglected by her workaholic husband Barry. Judd's older brother Paul is married to Judd's high school girlfriend Annie, and the two are struggling to conceive. The youngest sibling, Phillip, introduces them to his older therapist-turned-girlfriend Tracy. Their mother, Hilary, explains that Mort wanted them all to sit shiva, forcing the family together for the next seven days.

Staying in his childhood basement, Judd lies to everyone but Wendy about Quinn's absence, but admits the truth to his old classmate Penny Moore. He reconnects with Wendy's ex-boyfriend, Horry Callen, who suffered a brain injury years earlier and lives with his mother, Linda, Hilary's neighbor and closest friend. An argument about Phillip joining Paul in running their father's sporting goods business devolves into a fistfight. Phillip flirts with an ex-girlfriend in front of Tracy, and Wendy drunkenly badgers Judd into blurting out the truth about his wife's affair.

Quinn arrives to inform Judd that she is pregnant, and that the child must be his, as Wade is infertile. He visits and spends the night with Penny. Wendy reaches out to Horry, experiencing guilt over the car crash that led to his injury and the end of their relationship. After Phillip reveals Quinn's pregnancy to the family, Hilary brings them to temple, presided over by their classmate Rabbi Charles "Boner" Grodner. The brothers sneak away to smoke marijuana found in their father's suit jacket. Desperate to have a baby, Annie tries to seduce Judd, and Wendy later confides in him that she is still in love with Horry.

Judd's time with Penny is interrupted by a call from Quinn, who fears she is having a miscarriage. He races to the hospital, where Quinn and their baby are fine, but Wade appears, leading to a confrontation in the waiting room. Wendy arrives and punches Wade, while Judd convinces a group of young men to flip Wade's Jaguar E-Type. Wade admits that he cannot be there for Quinn, and Judd assures her that they will raise their child together, even though their marriage is over.

After an honest conversation with Judd, Tracy decides to break up with Phillip. Judd attempts to explain himself to Penny, who refuses to listen. While the house is full of mourners, Judd comforts an apologetic Annie, but Paul assumes he is hitting on her and chases him outside, just as Tracy leaves Phillip. As the brothers fight, Hilary shocks everyone into silence by kissing Linda. They reveal that they fell in love while caring for Mort, who gave them his blessing. Hilary admits that the shiva was her idea, allowing her to come out to her children while forcing them to reconnect.

When the power goes out in the basement, Judd attempts to fix the fuse box and is shocked unconscious. He relives a childhood memory of falling off his bicycle and being comforted by his father, and wakes up in his mother's arms. Inspired by Hilary and Linda, Judd apologizes to Penny, and they agree to reconnect after he has figured things out for himself, sharing a kiss. Wendy departs with her children, tearing up as she waves goodbye to Horry, while the brothers reconcile and Paul offers Phillip a job. Judd slips away, stealing Phillip's Porsche and driving to Maine, where he had always dreamed of going.

== Cast ==
- Jason Bateman as Judd Altman, the middle son of the four Altman siblings. He is married to Quinn, whom he recently caught cheating on him with his boss.
  - Oakes Fegley as Young Judd
- Tina Fey as Wendy Altman, the second-oldest of the four siblings; she is a responsible mother who is married to Barry and has two kids. She is the ex-girlfriend of her childhood friend Horry.
- Jane Fonda as Hilary Altman, the widowed mother of Judd, Phillip, Wendy, and Paul. She is a celebrity psychologist and writer.
- Adam Driver as Phillip Altman, the youngest of the four siblings; the playboy of the family who thinks he is an entrepreneur.
- Rose Byrne as Penny Moore, who had a crush on Judd in high school. He claims that he did not date her at the time because she was just a kid.
- Corey Stoll as Paul Altman, the oldest of the four siblings; the no-nonsense brother who is responsible for the family business. He is married to Annie.
- Kathryn Hahn as Annie Altman, Paul's wife, and Judd's ex-girlfriend. She and Paul have been trying to conceive.
- Connie Britton as Tracy Sullivan, Phillip's girlfriend, and ex-therapist
- Timothy Olyphant as Horry Callen, Wendy's ex-boyfriend, who lives with his mother across the street from the Altman family home due to a brain injury sustained from a car crash when he and Wendy were younger.
- Dax Shepard as Wade Beaufort, a shock jock radio personality and Judd's former boss
- Debra Monk as Linda Callen, the Altmans' neighbor, mother of Horry, and Hilary's best friend/romantic partner
- Abigail Spencer as Quinn Altman, Judd's wife
- Ben Schwartz as Rabbi Charles "Boner" Grodner, the town's young rabbi
- Aaron Lazar as Barry Weissman, Wendy's husband.
- Will Swenson as Younger Mort

== Production ==
This is Where I Leave You began principal photography on May 13, 2013, in New York City. The home is located in Munsey Park on Long Island. The skating rink scene was filmed at Newbridge Arena in Bellmore, New York. The synagogue interior and exterior scenes were shot at Congregation Kneses Tifereth Israel in Port Chester, New York. Approximately 40 members of the congregation played extras in the scenes.

== Music ==
On October 9, 2013, Michael Giacchino was hired to score the film. On August 25, 2014, it was announced that WaterTower Music would release a soundtrack album for the film on September 16, 2014.

=== Track listing ===
This Is Where I Leave You: Original Motion Picture Soundtrack
No.	Title	Length
1.	"Fall at Your Feet" (Performed by Saint Raymond)	4:03
2.	"Blue Mind" (Performed by Alexi Murdoch)	5:43
3.	"Never Tear Us Apart" (Performed by INXS)	3:02
4.	"Time After Time" (Performed by Cyndi Lauper)	4:01
5.	"Reign of Love" (Performed by Coldplay)	2:54
6.	"The Ghost in You" (Performed by The Psychedelic Furs)	4:17
7.	"Through the Dark" (Performed by Alexi Murdoch)	5:30
8.	"Are You Ready (On Your Own)" (Performed by Distant Cousins)	3:27

=== Additional music ===
- "How Do U Want It" by 2Pac
- "Ruff Ryders' Anthem" by DMX
- "Bitch Betta Have My Money" by AMG
- "Better Man" by Pearl Jam

== Marketing ==
On May 15, 2014 Entertainment Weekly revealed a still from the film featuring the whole cast. On May 28, 2014, the first trailer was released.

== Release ==
This Is Where I Leave You grossed $34.3 million in North America and $6.7 million in other territories for a total gross of $41 million, against its budget of about $20 million.

In its opening weekend, the film grossed $11.6 million, finishing 3rd at the box office behind fellow new releases The Maze Runner ($32.5 million) and A Walk Among the Tombstones ($12.8 million).

== Home media ==
The film was released on DVD and Blu-ray on December 16, 2014, by Warner Home Video.

== Reception ==
On Rotten Tomatoes, This Is Where I Leave You holds a rating of 45%, based on 166 reviews, with an average rating of 5.47/10. The site's consensus reads, "This Is Where I Leave You has its moments, but given the amount of talent assembled onscreen, the rather pedestrian results can't help but feel like a letdown." On Metacritic, the film has a score of 44 out of 100, based on 39 critics, indicating "mixed or average reviews". Audiences polled by CinemaScore gave the film an average grade of "B+" on an A+ to F scale.
