= She Wants Revenge (American Horror Story) =

- American Horror Story episode
- Episode no.: Season 5 Episode 9
- Directed by: Michael Uppendahl
- Written by: Brad Falchuk
- Production code: 5ATS09
- Original air date: December 9, 2015
- Running time: 46 minutes

Guest appearances
- Finn Wittrock as Rudolph Valentino; Mare Winningham as Hazel Evers; Alexandra Daddario as Natacha Rambova; Lyric Lennon as Lachlan Drake; Marla Gibbs as Cassie Royale; Henry G. Sanders as Mr. Royale

Episode chronology
← Previous "The Ten Commandments Killer"	Next → "She Gets Revenge"
- American Horror Story: Hotel

"She Wants Revenge" is the ninth episode of the fifth season of the anthology television series American Horror Story. It aired on December 9, 2015, on the cable network FX. This episode was written by Brad Falchuk and directed by Michael Uppendahl.

== Plot ==
The Countess is sad thinking about her generous "gifts" to people in the Cortez, as well as angry about what James March had done to her lover, Rudolph Valentino. She meets with Valentino to sort out their differences. She plans to construct the Cortez as a shelter against the modern world for her and Valentino, but only once she murders Will and inherits his fortune.

Donovan and Ramona enact their plan of vengeance. They reach the Cortez and prepare to kill the Countess, but Donovan, still in love with Elizabeth, traps Ramona in a blocked hallway and tasers her.

Alex Lowe meets the vampire children and tries to get them to the hotel. The Countess and Will enter the wedding area at the hotel lobby, despite Liz's protests to stop it.

After the wedding, Elizabeth's new husband March leads Will to Room 33, to see Elizabeth's baby, Bartholomew. He insults her, causing Elizabeth to knock him out and imprison him with Ramona. Will frees himself and does the same for Ramona, however she kills him and feasts on his blood.

== Reception ==
"She Wants Revenge" was watched by 2.14 million people during its original broadcast, and gained a 1.2 ratings share among adults aged 18–49.

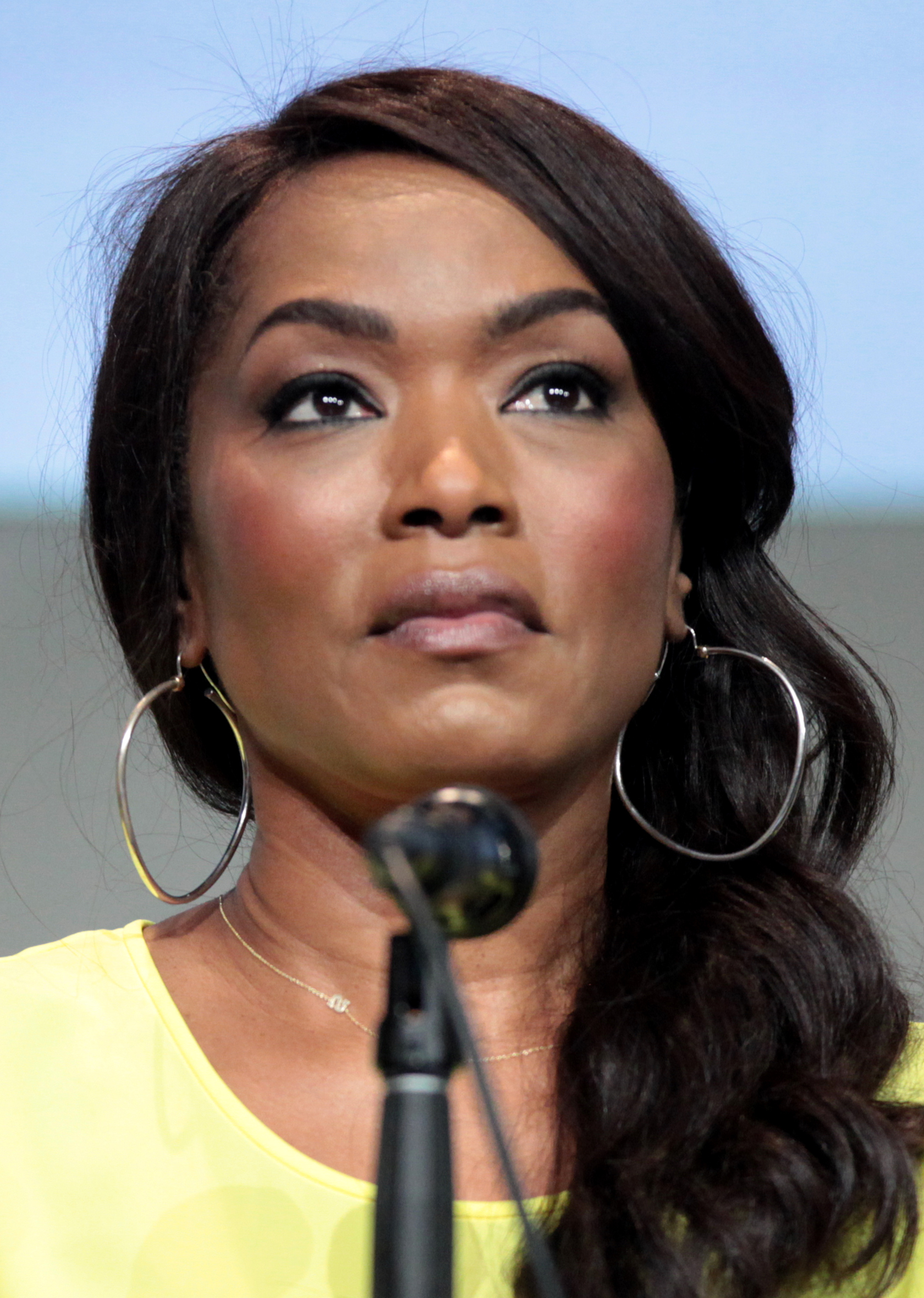
Reviewers criticized the under-utilization of Angela Bassett in the series as a whole and believed Ramona's storyline did not fit in the episode.

The episode received mixed to positive reviews, earning a 64% approval rating based on 14 reviews, with an average score of 6.6/10, on review aggregator Rotten Tomatoes. The critical consensus reads: "Angela Bassett shines as Ramona Royale in "She Wants Revenge," but her story arc feels forced this late in the season of Hotel." Alex Stedman from Variety believed that "the aptly titled "She Wants Revenge" moves the plot quickly in ways that few episodes before it have", complimenting the plotline as well as the upcoming expectations the episode enabled. Michael Calia from The Wall Street Journal commented that "[a]fter getting lost in Det. John Lowe's long, strange, bloody and warped trip last time, AHS: Hotel turned its attention back to the character at the center of it all, Lady Gaga's the Countess. This week's episode, "She Wants Revenge", casts the Countess as an immortal on a mission. Well, make that several missions." Matt Fowler from IGN was also of the same opinion, saying, "Hotel sobered up this week, peeling itself away from its current streak of enjoyable-but-masturbatory flashbacks to coldly remind us that the beating heart of this season is an unfathomably dull vampire story."

Writing for the Den of Geek, Ron Hogan observed, "One of the interesting choices in this episode, written by Brad Falchuk, is that it's communicated mostly through voiceovers. We see montages of characters doing acts, but most of what we actually hear is from a recording booth." He complimented Michael Uppendahl's direction as well as some of the visuals of the episode. Brian Moylan from New York Daily News rated the episode 3 out of 5 stars, saying that "[the] episode certainly took a hard left turn, didn't it?... Sure, there's plenty of killing and bloodletting, but not even a single measly Seven rip-offs." Moylan believed that the unnecessary bits of the episode, including the sub-plot regarding the porn filming, were adequately mixed in the main story. E.A. Hanks from The New York Times believed that "She Wants Revenge" "returned to one of this season's most interesting themes – how love and hate can be bedfellows." Darren Franich from Entertainment Weekly observed that "[the episode] was at the point of an American Horror Story season when the players on the final-act chessboard start moving into position".

Emily Stephens from The A.V. Club stated, "A lot of the details in "She Wants Revenge" seem beside the point, too little too late, and uncomfortably low on results". She especially criticized the under-utilization of Angela Bassett and her "confusing" storyline. Ryan Sandoval reviewed the episode for TV.com and criticized the excessive monologues as well as the episode being "a regular soap opera this week on American Horror Story: Hotel, complete with betrayals, broken hearts, dramatic revelations, and thwarted revenge plots, all taking place on the Countess's wedding day no less". Ross Bonaime from Paste rated the episode 6.8 out of 10, saying, "Everyone makes mistakes, but in American Horror Story's case, it seems like its own mistakes could have been solved with a bit more planning and foresight. There's a lot of holes left in this Hotel with not a lot of time to fill them up."
