= She Gets Revenge =

- American Horror Story episode
- Episode no.: Season 5 Episode 10
- Directed by: Bradley Buecker
- Written by: James Wong
- Production code: 5ATS10
- Original air date: December 16, 2015
- Running time: 50 minutes

Guest appearances
- Finn Wittrock as Rudolph Valentino; Mare Winningham as Hazel Evers; Alexandra Daddario as Natacha Rambova; Josh Braaten as Douglas Pryor; Lennon Henry as Holden Lowe; Marco Rodriguez as El Rey

Episode chronology
← Previous "She Wants Revenge"	Next → "Battle Royale"
- American Horror Story: Hotel

"She Gets Revenge" is the tenth episode of the fifth season of the horror anthology television series American Horror Story. It aired on December 16, 2015, on the cable network FX. The episode was written by James Wong and directed by Bradley Buecker.

== Plot ==
At a motel, Donovan kills Valentino, while Elizabeth kills Natacha over at the Cortez.

John Lowe confronts Alex for lying to him about Holden being at the hotel. Alex apologizes and the two make amends. She informs John that Elizabeth has threatened to kill her and Holden if she does not contain an outbreak of the virus that she started when she infected her patient, Max.

Will accuses Elizabeth of having Ramona kill him so she may inherit his money. Will informs her that she isn't in the will, but Elizabeth retorts by saying Lachlan Drake is, and that before he reaches eighteen, she will turn him, so she can be his legal guardian forever and inherit the money Will left for him.

Alex and John convince the children she infected to come back to the hotel, but only ends up trapping them in the enclosed hallway where they are confronted by Ramona Royale. Alex and John reconcile and leave the hotel with Holden.

Liz reunites with her son, Douglas Pryor, and convinces him to move out to Boulder to pursue his dream of running his own company and they make amends. Liz and Iris scheme to take over the hotel, starting with shooting up the penthouse with Donovan and The Countess inside.

== Reception ==
"She Gets Revenge" was watched by 1.85 million people during its original broadcast, and gained a 0.9 ratings share among adults aged 18–49. It also ranked second in the Nielsen Social ratings, with 58,000 tweets seen by over 883 thousand people.

The episode received positive reviews, earning an 86% approval rating based on 14 reviews, with an average score of 6.4/10, on review aggregator Rotten Tomatoes. The critical consensus reads: "After a touching resolution to Elizabeth Taylor's family reunion, "She Gets Revenge" caps things off with a rousing cliffhanger in Hotel's satisfying mid-season finale."
