= Flicker (American Horror Story) =

- American Horror Story episode
- Episode no.: Season 5 Episode 7
- Directed by: Michael Goi
- Written by: Crystal Liu
- Production code: 5ATS07
- Original air date: November 18, 2015
- Running time: 43 minutes

Guest appearances
- Finn Wittrock as Rudolph Valentino; Mare Winningham as Hazel Evers; Christine Estabrook as Marcy; Richard T. Jones as Detective Hahn; Alexandra Daddario as Natacha Rambova; David Barrera as Dr. Kaplan; Lyric Lennon as Lachlan Drake

Episode chronology
← Previous "Room 33"	Next → "The Ten Commandments Killer"
- American Horror Story: Hotel

"Flicker" is the seventh episode of the fifth season of the anthology television series American Horror Story. It aired on November 18, 2015, on the cable network FX. This episode was written by Crystal Liu and directed by Michael Goi.

== Plot ==
In a flashback to 1925, the human Elizabeth is seduced by the actor Rudolph Valentino and his wife Natacha Rambova. Valentino dies and Elizabeth marries, only to run into the "dead" Valentino resurrected as a vampire. Valentino and Natacha subsequently turn Elizabeth into a vampire as well.

In the present, Detective Lowe breaks into the restricted room 153, finding a young girl called Wren. She tells him she helped the Ten Commandments Killer during the murders, and John tells her that it was not her fault. In 1986, her father abandoned her in front of the Hotel Cortez, and Elizabeth turned her. She says that if John finds a way to get her out, she will take him to the killer.

Valentino and Natacha are revealed to have been trapped inside the hotel ever since turning Elizabeth. March and Hazel prepare a dinner for Elizabeth, who has agreed to dine with him at least once per month. She tells him her plans to marry Drake. She reveals Drake as her new love, but March clarifies that Elizabeth was never in love with him, hence he trapped Valentino and Natacha inside the sealed hallway. Regenerated, Valentino and Natacha check out of the hotel. Elsewhere, Wren and John escape the hospital. She asks if he intends to kill the killer, receiving a positive answer. She responds by saying that she likes him, before running into oncoming traffic and being hit by a truck.

== Reception ==
"Flicker" was watched by 2.64 million people during its original broadcast, and gained a 1.4 ratings share among adults aged 18–49. It also ranked second in the Nielsen Social ratings, with 115,000 tweets seen by over 1.12 million people.

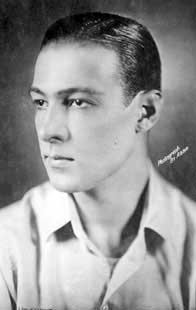
Finn Wittrock portrayed actor Rudolph Valentino (pictured in 1919).

The episode received critical acclaim. It has earned a 100% approval rating based on 12 reviews, with an average score of 8.53/10, on review aggregator Rotten Tomatoes. The critical consensus reads: ""Flicker" is an especially enjoyable and tightly scripted episode of Hotel, presenting an intriguing backstory for Lady Gaga's Countess character." Alex Stedman from Variety complimented "Flicker" for revealing more backstory about Gaga's character, as well as secrets hidden in the titular hotel. He added, "Most importantly, though, we learn even more about the Countess' backstory and, for the first time, see her pre-ancient blood virus. And, in a rare occasion, we see her genuinely, truly scared." Another positive review came from Matt Fowler of IGN who rated the episode 7.6 on 10, and believed that the "strongest" plots of Hotel were surrounding those of Evan Peters' James March character. He also complimented that the Countess' storyline was expanded and the connections were established. However, Fowler believed Gaga's acting needed improvement with her dialogue delivery.

Michael Calia from The Wall Street Journal described the episode as "[conjuring] a version of Hollywood history soaked in blood, sex and treachery. You know, like actual Hollywood history, except involving the undead". Emily L. Stephens from The A.V. Club gave it a rating of A−, giving positive review for the plotline, the time utilization and the "tight narrative", complimenting Gaga, Bates and Peters' acting. She ended the review with her observation saying, "The characters of "Flicker" are seduced by the allure of immortality. They strive to become gods, if not through the flicker of film and the adoration of the masses, then by sacrificing their humanity."

Writing for Entertainment Weekly, Darren Franch complimented one line spoken by Bates, "I couldn't pick my butthole out of a lineup", in reference to the character Will Drake getting his anus waxed, and wrote, "What a line! I would take a whole episode of American Horror Story that was just every member of the cast stepping into the spotlight on a darkened stage, clearing their throat, and intoning." The line was also commended by Lacy Baugher from The Baltimore Sun. However, Baugher felt that Denis O'Hare and Angela Bassett were underutilized. Ryan Sandoval from TV.com commended the backstory of the characters in the episode, adding that the "episode was essentially showing us the bare-bones theme of the whole season like a corpse dunked in an acid bath: the cost of fame". Danielle Henderson from Cosmopolitan gave a positive review to the portrayal of Valentino and the fan reactions surrounding his death in the episode, as well as his fictional portrayal as a vampire. However, Henderson criticized Gaga's emotionless delivery and her makeup in the scene with Peters.
