= David Schickler =

American novelist

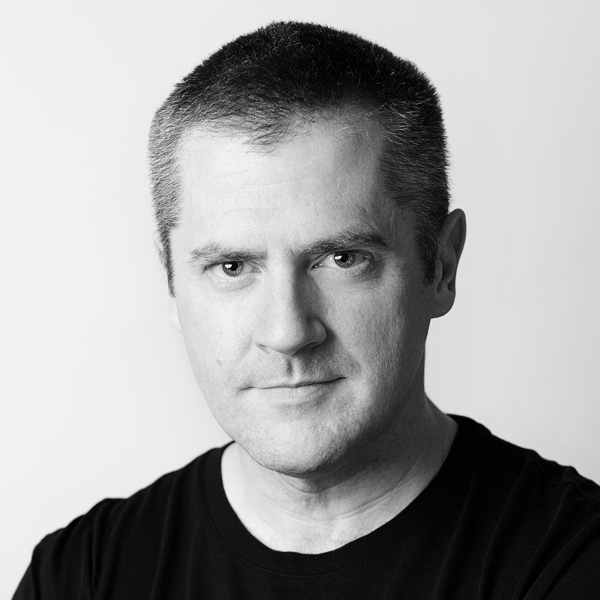
- Schickler in 2013
- Born: July 30, 1969 (age 57); Rochester, New York, U.S.
- Education: McQuaid Jesuit High School; Georgetown University; Columbia University
- Occupations: Screenwriter; author

David Schickler (born July 30, 1969, in Rochester, New York) is an American screenwriter and author, most recently of the memoir The Dark Path, published by Riverhead Books in September 2013. He is the co-creator and an executive producer of the Cinemax television series Banshee, which premiered in 2013. He is the author of the New York Times bestselling short story collection Kissing in Manhattan (2001) and the nationally bestselling novel Sweet and Vicious (2004). He has written original and adapted scripts for Universal, Lions Gate, Sidney Kimmel and Wildwood Films.

His books have been published in nine countries and his stories have appeared in The New Yorker, Travel + Leisure, and Zoetrope: All-Story, as well as on Selected Shorts. His short story "The Smoker" won an O. Henry Award and was optioned by Paramount Pictures.

Schickler graduated from McQuaid Jesuit High School. He received his undergraduate degree from Georgetown University and Masters from Columbia University. He now lives in Rochester, New York with his wife and children.

== Works ==
=== Filmography ===
==== Television ====
===== Creator =====
Title	Year	Network	Notes
Banshee	2013–16	Cinemax	Created with Jonathan Tropper

===== Producer =====
Title	Year	Notes
Banshee	2013–14	executive producer (seasons 1–2; 20 episodes)
Banshee Origins	2013–14	executive producer (seasons 1–2; 25 episodes)

===== Writer =====
Title	Year	Notes
Banshee	2013–14	10 episodes
Banshee Origins	2013	13 episodes (season 1)

=== Bibliography ===
- Kissing in Manhattan (short story collection) (2001) ISBN 0-385-33567-9
- Sweet and Vicious (novel) (2004) ISBN 0-385-33569-5
- The Dark Path (memoir) (2013) ISBN 978-1594486456
