= Peter Gornstein =

Danish filmmaker

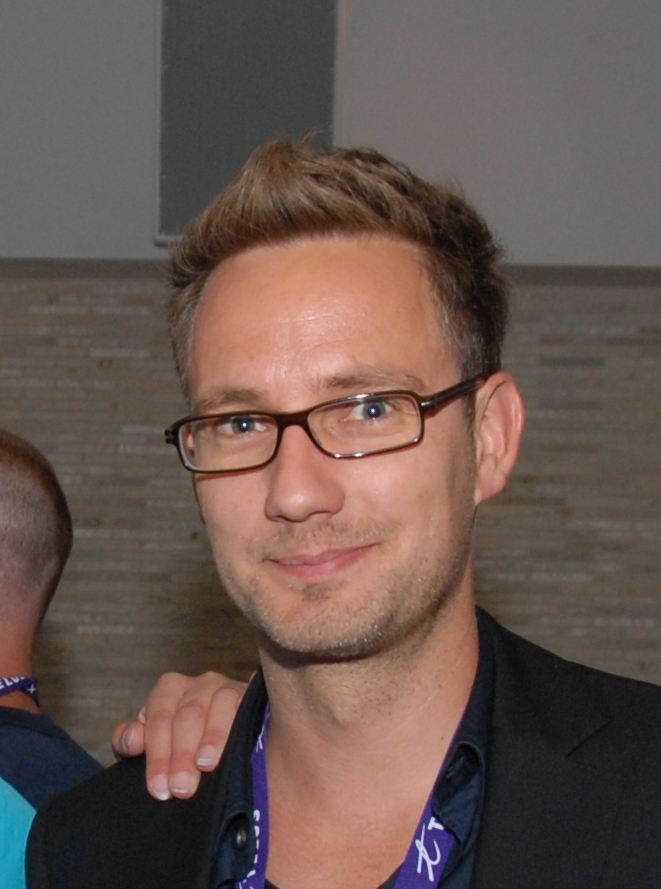
- Peter Gornstein at a CFC Filmmakers Reception in 2011
- Occupations: Filmmaker and Writer
- Known for: Rise Son of Rome. Hitman. Teo and the Magic Talisman. Starship Troopers. Avatar. Peace Force.

Peter Gornstein is a Danish filmmaker.

He has directed feature films, television episodes, video games and commercials as well as written several screenplays and teleplays. He has also worked in various technical roles in film production as well as AAA game productions, even earning recognition at SIGGRAPH 2014.

His 2007 film Sunrise won three awards, the Fuji Film International Short Film Award, the Panavision Award and an award from FotoKem.
