= Jonathan Tropper =

American novelist and television writer

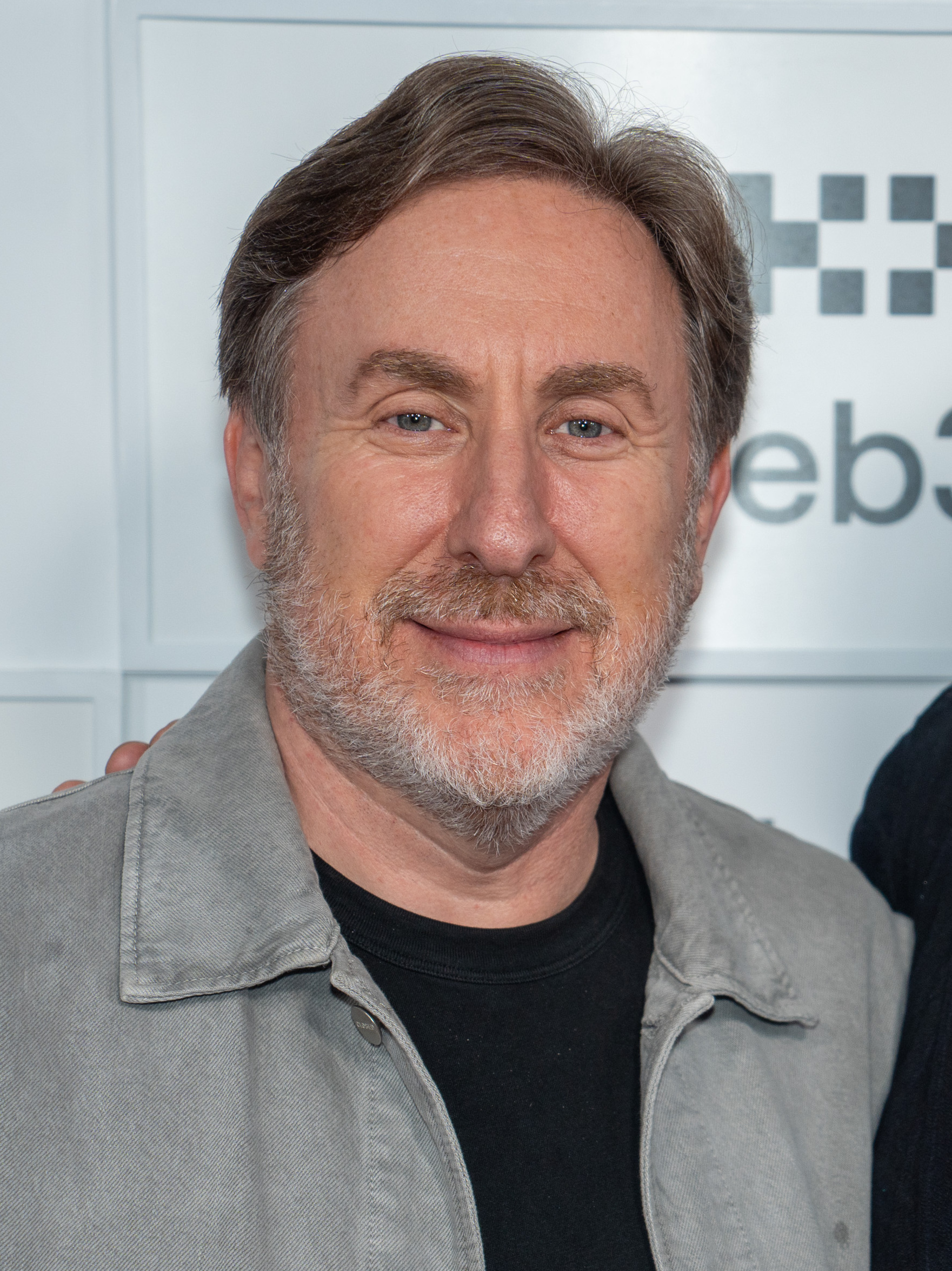
- Tropper in 2025
- Born: February 19, 1970 (age 56); Riverdale, New York, U.S.
- Education: Yeshiva University; New York University
- Occupations: Author, writer, director, producer
- Spouse(s): Elizabeth Parker (divorced) Stephanie Abram (m. 2016)
- Children: 4
- Writing career
- Period: 2000–present
- Subjects: fiction, humor
- Notable works: This Is Where I Leave You, Banshee, Warrior, Your Friends & Neighbors

Jonathan Tropper (born February 19, 1970) is an American author, writer, director, and producer. He is best known as the co-creator of the Cinemax television series Banshee (2013–2016) and as the creator of the Cinemax series Warrior (2019–2023) and the Apple TV+ series Your Friends & Neighbors (2025–present).

== Early life and education ==
Tropper was born in the Riverdale section of the Bronx, New York City in a liberal observant Jewish home. During his childhood he attended Camp Morasha, a co-ed Modern Orthodox sleepaway camp in the Poconos. At age 18, he briefly studied in Israel.

He studied English as an undergraduate at Yeshiva University and received a master's degree in creative writing at New York University (NYU).

== Career ==
After receiving his master's degree from NYU, Tropper spent eight years running a Manhattan-based company that manufactured displays for jewelry companies. He wrote at night and on weekends, ultimately publishing his first novel, Plan B, which attracted the attention of an agent, allowing him to leave his job and become a full-time writer. Five of Tropper's six books have been optioned at auction within a week of publication (The Book of Joe, How to Talk to a Widower, Everything Changes, One Last Thing Before I Go, and This Is Where I Leave You).

The themes of his books appear to stem from his personal experiences: they deal with topics such as being single, growing up, getting married, being married, getting divorced, and living in suburbia. Tropper's hometown of New Rochelle in Westchester County, New York, is a main source of inspiration when creating the characters and settings in his books.

How to Talk to a Widower was a 2007 selection for The Richard and Judy Show in the United Kingdom. Everything Changes was a Booksense selection. Three of Tropper's books were optioned to be adapted into films: Tropper co-wrote the adaptation of The Book of Joe with Ed Burns, who was set to direct; This Is Where I Leave You, published in August 2009, was made into the 2014 film of the same name; and One Last Thing Before I Go, published in August 2012, was optioned by Paramount Pictures for J. J. Abrams to produce.

Tropper co-created the television series Banshee with David Schickler. The show aired on Cinemax, with Tropper serving as an executive producer.

In October 2017, it was announced that his series Warrior, based on Bruce Lee's original idea and set against the Tong Wars of 19th century San Francisco, received a straight-to-series order at Cinemax. The series debuted on Cinemax in April 2019 to critical acclaim. Tropper served as showrunner and executive producer. Justin Lin, director of multiple Fast and Furious films and Bruce Lee's daughter, Shannon Lee, served as executive producers.

In 2020, Tropper took over as showrunner and executive producer of the Apple TV+ science fiction series See, starring Jason Momoa, Alfre Woodard, and Dave Bautista.

=== Films ===
Tropper wrote the screenplay for the 2014 film adaptation of his novel This is Where I Leave You, directed by Shawn Levy; the film co-starred Jason Bateman, Tina Fey, Adam Driver and Jane Fonda. Tropper later produced and wrote the screenplay for Kodachrome (2017), starring Jason Sudeikis, Ed Harris, and Elizabeth Olsen. The film debuted at the Toronto International Film Festival to mixed reviews, and was acquired by Netflix.

Tropper wrote the screenplay for The Adam Project, a science-fiction thriller starring Ryan Reynolds and directed by Shawn Levy. In July 2024, it was announced that Tropper would reunite with Levy on a then-untitled film in the Star Wars franchise, later titled Star Wars: Starfighter; the film, starring Ryan Gosling, will be released in theatres on May 28, 2027. In July 2026, it was announced that Tropper would reunite with Levy and Gosling on a Ghost Rider film set in the Marvel Cinematic Universe; the film is set to be released on July 28, 2028.

== Personal life and activism ==
Tropper has three children with his first wife Elizabeth Parker. In 2016, he married Stephanie Abram, with whom he has one child.

Tropper was a signatory of "No Hostage Left Behind," a 2023 open letter espousing support for Israel in the Gaza war and asking US President Joe Biden to ensure the release of hostages kidnapped during the October 7 attacks.

== Filmography ==
=== Film ===
Year	Title	Writer	Producer
2014	This Is Where I Leave You	Yes	Executive
2017	Kodachrome	Yes	Yes
2018	Irreplaceable You	No	Yes
2022	The Adam Project	Yes	No
2026	The Wrecking Crew	Yes	Executive
2026	Matchbox: The Movie	Uncredited	No
2027	Star Wars: Starfighter	Yes	No

=== Television ===
Year	Title	Creator	Showrunner	Director	Writer	Executive producer	Notes
2013–2014	Banshee Origins	No	No	No	No	Yes	Wrote 24 episodes
2013–2016	Banshee	Yes	Yes	Yes	Yes	Yes	Directed episode: "Only One Way a Dogfight Ends"; Wrote 17 episodes
2017	Vinyl	No	No	No	Yes	No	Wrote episode: "Whispered Secrets"
2019–2022	See	No	Yes	No	Yes	Yes	Wrote 7 episodes
2019–2023	Warrior	Yes	Yes	Yes	Yes	Yes	Directed episode: "Learn to Endure, or Hire a Bodyguard"; Wrote 8 episodes
2025–present	Your Friends & Neighbors	Yes	Yes	Yes	Yes	Yes	Directed episode: "Everything Becomes Symbol and Irony"; Wrote 6 episodes
2026	Lucky	Yes	Yes	No	Yes	Yes	Wrote 2 episodes

== Bibliography ==
- 2000 – Plan B (ISBN 978-0312272760)
- 2004 – The Book of Joe (ISBN 978-0385338103)
- 2005 – Everything Changes (ISBN 978-0385337427)
- 2007 – How to Talk to a Widower (ISBN 978-0385338912)
- 2009 – This Is Where I Leave You (ISBN 978-0525951278)
- 2012 – One Last Thing Before I Go (ISBN 978-0525952367)
