= Banshee (TV series) =

American action television series

- Genre: Action thriller; Crime drama; Police procedural; Serial drama
- Created by: Jonathan Tropper; David Schickler
- Starring: Antony Starr; Ivana Miličević; Ulrich Thomsen; Frankie Faison; Hoon Lee; Rus Blackwell; Matt Servitto; Demetrius Grosse; Trieste Kelly Dunn; Ryann Shane; Daniel Ross Owens; Lili Simmons; Ben Cross; Anthony Ruivivar; Geno Segers; Afton Williamson; Langley Kirkwood; Matthew Rauch; Tom Pelphrey; Chris Coy
- Theme music composer: Methodic Doubt
- Composer: Kris Dirksen
- Country of origin: United States
- Original language: English
- No. of seasons: 4
- No. of episodes: 38 (list of episodes)

Production
- Executive producers: Jonathan Tropper; David Schickler; Peter Macdissi; Alan Ball; Greg Yaitanes; O.C. Madsen; Adam Targum
- Producers: Chad Feehan; Robert F. Phillips
- Production locations: Charlotte, NC and Mooresville, NC (Season 1–3); Vandergrift, Pennsylvania (Season 4)
- Cinematography: Christopher Faloona
- Editor: Chris A. Peterson
- Running time: 43–59 minutes
- Production companies: Your Face Goes Here Entertainment; Tropper Schickler Productions; One Olive; HBO Entertainment

Original release
- Network: Cinemax
- Release: January 11, 2013 – May 20, 2016

Banshee is an American action television series created by Jonathan Tropper and David Schickler that aired on Cinemax from January 11, 2013, to May 20, 2016, over four seasons and 38 episodes. Set in the small fictional town of Banshee in Pennsylvania Amish country, the series' main character is an enigmatic ex-con (Antony Starr) who assumes the identity of Lucas Hood, the town's murdered sheriff, to hide from powerful crime lord Rabbit (Ben Cross). Imposing his own brand of justice, Hood attempts to reconcile with his former lover, Rabbit's daughter Anastasia (Ivana Miličević), who has herself adopted an assumed identity, married, and raised a family during Hood's incarceration. Hood struggles to maintain his new identity while still embracing crime alongside his partners Job (Hoon Lee) and Sugar (Frankie Faison) and coming into conflict with local kingpin Kai Proctor (Ulrich Thomsen).

The show, along with Strike Back, was one of Cinemax's first original series since Comedy Experiment and The Richard Belzer Show in the 1980s to early '90s. A 10-episode second season debuted in January 2014. Banshee was renewed for a third season that same month, which debuted in January 2015. In February 2015, the series was renewed for an eight-episode fourth and final season. The final episode aired on May 20, 2016.

== Premise ==
A man is released from prison after serving 15 years for stealing $15 million in diamonds on behalf of his employer, a Ukrainian mob boss named Rabbit. His former lover and accomplice, Rabbit's daughter Anastasia (Ana), and he had already decided to keep the loot for themselves. Anastasia got away with the diamonds and Rabbit is after the man, thinking he will lead him to his daughter and the diamonds. The man flees to the small fictional Pennsylvanian town of Banshee, where Ana has been living under the alias of Carrie Hopewell, mother of two and wife of the district attorney. Lucas Hood, the new sheriff, stops at a bar on his way into town and immediately is killed when he intervenes in a dispute between local criminals and the bar owner. The man takes Hood's identity and has to impersonate the sheriff and deal with ex-Amish crime lord Kai Proctor, sort things out with "Carrie", and get his share of the diamonds while evading Rabbit.

Season one focuses on Hood's attempts to restore his relationship with Carrie under the looming threat of Rabbit finding them. Hood completely disregards the law while clashing with Proctor and pursuing his often criminal activities, alienating his own deputies. Rabbit eventually tracks him down and Hood surrenders to spare Carrie. Carrie leads some criminal accomplices and the deputies in a raid to free Hood and shoots Rabbit.

Season two deals with tribal chief Alex Longshadow's attempt to build a casino on the reservation, which places Sheriff Hood in the middle of a violent struggle between Longshadow and Proctor. Carrie must face up to her past when she is imprisoned for her part in the raid against her father. With Carrie trying to fix her marriage, Hood enters into a relationship with his deputy, Siobhan. He must deal with the real Hood's son when he comes to Banshee looking for his father. Hood and Carrie are forced to track down and confront Rabbit and settle things once and for all when they learn he survived being shot.

== Episodes ==
Season	Episodes	Originally released	
Season	Episodes	First released	Last released
1	10	January 11, 2013	March 15, 2013
2	10	January 10, 2014	March 14, 2014
3	10	January 9, 2015	March 13, 2015
4	8	April 1, 2016	May 20, 2016

== Cast and characters ==
=== Main ===
- Antony Starr as the man known as Lucas Hood: An ex-con and master thief released from prison after 15 years, he adopts the identity of the real Lucas Hood, Banshee's incoming sheriff, who dies in the premiere episode. His true identity is never revealed throughout the entire run of the series.
- Ivana Miličević as Anastasia "Ana" Rabitova / Carrie Hopewell: Hood's former criminal accomplice and lover, she lives in Banshee under an alias as a real-estate agent with her husband Gordon and children Deva and Max, who are unaware of her past. She is also in hiding from "Mr. Rabbit", her father.
- Ulrich Thomsen as Kai Proctor: A crime kingpin and businessman in Banshee, Proctor was originally a member of Banshee's Amish community, but abandoned the faith for crime.
- Frankie Faison as Sugar Bates: A retired former boxer and ex-con turned bar owner, he befriends Hood and is aware that he is a criminal.
- Hoon Lee as Job: A hair stylist and Hood's criminal accomplice, he is an expert computer hacker and a cross-dresser. He is also in hiding from "Mr. Rabbit", and is forced to move to Banshee after his identity is uncovered.
- Rus Blackwell as Gordon Hopewell: Banshee's district attorney and Carrie's husband, he is a Gulf War hero and retired Marine (seasons 1–3).
- Matt Servitto as Brock Lotus: A Banshee deputy, he is the longest-serving member of the force. Brock intended to become the new sheriff before the real Hood's appointment and is resentful of being passed over.
- Demetrius Grosse as Emmett Yawners: A Banshee deputy (seasons 1–2)
- Trieste Kelly Dunn as Siobhan Kelly: A Banshee deputy (seasons 1–3)
- Ryann Shane as Deva Hopewell: A rebellious teenager and daughter of Carrie and Hood
- Daniel Ross Owens as Daniel "Dan" Kendall: Banshee's mayor, he is an idealist and young politician opposed to Proctor's criminal activities (season 1).
- Lili Simmons as Rebecca Bowman: A young ex-Amish girl, she lived a devout life with her father Elijah and mother Miriam by day, but was rebellious and sexually promiscuous by night until her family discovers her double life and kicks her out. She is Proctor's niece and the only member of the Amish community with whom he has contact. Her uncle takes her under his wing and grooms her to be his successor.
- Ben Cross as Igor "Mr. Rabbit" Rabitov: A ruthless Ukrainian gangster, he is seeking revenge on Hood for stealing from him and turning his daughter Anastasia against him (seasons 1–2).
- Anthony Ruivivar as Alexander "Alex" Longshadow: A Native American chief and Proctor's rival (season 2; recurring season 1; guest season 3)
- Geno Segers as Chayton "the Falcon" Littlestone: The imposing leader of the local Kinaho tribal gang the Redbones (season 3; guest seasons 2 and 4)
- Afton Williamson as Alison Medding: Assistant district attorney (season 3; recurring season 2)
- Langley Kirkwood as Colonel Douglas Stowe: A U.S. Marine, he is running an illegal business out of Banshee's Camp Genoa (season 3).
- Matthew Rauch as Clayton "Clay" Burton: Proctor's ruthless right-hand man (season 4; recurring seasons 1–3)
- Tom Pelphrey as Kurt Bunker: A former member of the Aryan Brotherhood, he becomes a Banshee deputy. (recurring season 3; season 4)
- Chris Coy as Calvin Bunker: The leader of the Aryan Brotherhood in Banshee and the younger brother of Kurt Bunker guest season 3; season 4)

=== Recurring ===
- Steve Coulter as Elijah Bowman: Father of Rebecca Bowman (seasons 1–4)
- Samantha Worthen as Miriam Bowman: Mother of Rebecca Bowman (seasons 1–4)
- Odette Annable as Nola Longshadow: Alex's sister (seasons 1–3)
- Christos Vasilopoulos as Olek: Right-hand-man to "Mr. Rabbit" (seasons 1–2)
- Joseph Gatt as "the Albino": A prisoner who served time with Hood and was granted custody of him (recurring seasons 1–2, guest season 4)
- Derek Cecil as Special Agent Dean Xavier: An FBI agent (seasons 1–2)
- Gabriel Suttle as Max Hopewell: Carrie and Gordon's son (recurring seasons 1–2, stand-in season 3)
- Deja Dee as Alma: Employee at Banshee's Sheriff Department (seasons 1–3)
- Chelsea Cardwell as Beaty: Deva's best friend. (seasons 1–3)
- Robert Treveiler as Jackson Sperling: Kai Proctor's lawyer. (seasons 1–3)
- Harrison Thomas as Jason Hood: The real Lucas Hood's son (guest season 1, recurring season 2)
- Željko Ivanek as Special Agent Jim Racine: An FBI agent (season 2)
- Gil Birmingham as George Hunter: A member of the Kinaho Tribal Council and Alex Longshadow's rival for the position of chief (season 2)
- Amber Midthunder as Lana Cleary (season 2)
- Reg E. Cathey as Detective Julius Bonner: An NYPD detective who had arrested the protagonist after the diamond robbery (guest season 2)
- Maya Gilbert as Juliet: A stripper (season 2)
- Eddie Cooper as Fat Au: A New York-based crime lord who is an old friend of Hood and Job's (seasons 2–4)
- Jennifer Griffin as Leah Proctor: Kai's mother (seasons 2–3)
- Tyson Sullivan as "Hondo": Key enforcer for the Aryan Brotherhood in Banshee, who works for Kai (recurring season 2, guest season 3)
- Julian Sands as Yulish Rabitov: "Mr. Rabbit"'s brother and a priest (season 2)
- Chaske Spencer as Billy Raven: A former officer of the Kinaho Reservation Police Department before becoming a Banshee deputy, who is now considered an outcast by his people (recurring season 3, guest season 4)
- Meaghan Rath as Aimee King: The sole honest officer in the corrupt Kinaho Reservation Police Department (season 3)
- Tanya Clarke as Emily Lotus: Brock's ex-wife and Kai's mistress (season 3)
- Happy Anderson as "Bones" Tuesday: A Cajun fight club owner whose star fighter is Chayton Littlestone (season 3)
- Dennis Flanagan as Leo Fitzpatrick: A computer hacker (seasons 3–4)
- David Harbour as Robert Dalton: A black-operations agent (guest seasons 3–4)
- Casey LaBow as Maggie Bunker: Calvin Bunker's wife, who wants a better life for her son and herself (season 4)
- Eliza Dushku as Special Agent Veronica Dawson: An FBI agent, she is incredibly reckless and also has personal demons of her own. She is hunting down a serial killer who has just arrived in Banshee (season 4).
- Chance Kelly as Randall Watts: Maggie's father (season 4)
- Frederick Weller as Declan Bode: A satanist and a serial killer (season 4)
- Nestor Serrano as Emilio Loera: A powerful member of the cartel (season 4)
- Ana Ayora as Nina Cruz: A smart, tough and streetwise Banshee deputy who is also working as a mole for Proctor (season 4)

== Production ==
Promotional poster for Banshee

Banshee is part of Cinemax's attempt to expand its original programming content, and it joins Strike Back (joining as a co-producer from season 2 onwards) and Sandbox. Banshee premiered on January 11, 2013.

The show was first revealed in August 2011, when it was announced that Alan Ball would produce the crime drama. Ball helped develop the project alongside creators Jonathan Tropper and David Schickler. By August, Cinemax was finalizing casting and financial details with the intention of filming in the spring of 2012 in North Carolina. In January 2012, Cinemax ordered 10 episodes for the show's first season, with the first episode being directed by Greg Yaitanes. In March 2012, Servitto, Dunn, and Owens were cast as, respectively, Brock Lotus, Siobhan Kelly, and Mayor Dan Kendall. Later that month, Starr was cast as lead character Lucas Hood, alongside Grosse as deputy Emmett Yawners, Thomsen as Kai Proctor, Lee as Job, and Milicevic as Carrie Hopewell. Simmons was cast in April as Proctor's niece, Rebecca Bowman, an Amish girl who lives a rebellious double life, and in August 2012, Odette Annable was cast in the recurring role of Nola Longshadow, a Native American assassin. Tropper, Schickler, Ball, Yaitanes, and Peter Macdissi serve as executive producers.

During the first day of shooting on the series, Starr suffered a facial injury when stunt fight choreography went wrong, splitting his lip open. He continued to film for six hours to complete the scene before going to the hospital to receive six stitches. The injury required digital removal for all scenes set before the fight but filmed after the stunt, resulting in lengthy postproduction on the first episode. Some of the many fight scenes on the show can take up to 25 hours to film. Yaitanes cited Jason Statham-starring action films, and John Carpenter films Big Trouble in Little China (1986) and They Live (1988) as inspiration for the fights and violence in Banshee. Marcus Young serves as the series' fight choreographer.

On January 29, 2013, Cinemax renewed Banshee for a 10-episode second season, which premiered on January 10, 2014. The season's opening action set piece featuring Milicevic, Starr, and Lee performing a high-speed heist was filmed across five miles of closed highway. Tropper originally wrote the scene for the show's accompanying graphic novel, Banshee Origins, which follows the trio 16 years earlier, but he decided that it would be an interesting live-action stunt. The season finale's shoot out was filmed inside a church in Harlem, New York City. The scene was shot over three days.

After three episodes of the second season had aired, Banshee was renewed for a third season, which premiered on January 9, 2015.

For the first three seasons, filming took place mainly in the Mooresville, North Carolina, area. In addition, other area locations were used including Huntersville, Mount Ulla, Lincolnton, Salisbury, Charlotte, Monroe, Gastonia, and Waxhaw. Because North Carolina's legislature chose not to continue tax credits for filming movies and TV series, the show moved to Vandergrift, Pennsylvania, about 30 miles (48 km) north east of Pittsburgh. Pennsylvania has continued to offer tax incentives.

== Reception ==
The first season of Banshee holds a 67% approval rating on Rotten Tomatoes, with an average rating of 6.10/10 and based from 36 reviews. The website's critics consensus reads: "Its trappings are nothing new and its lurid combination of violence and sex will likely turn away some viewers, but Banshee can be entertaining in some distinctive ways." Seasons two, three, and four received approval ratings of 94%, 100%, and 100%, respectively. On Metacritic, season one holds a weighted average score of 66 out of 100 based on reviews from 29 critics, indicating "generally favorable reviews".

The Wall Street Journal critic Dorothy Rabinowitz wrote, "Its smartness comes shining through despite the claptrap (none worse than the parade of sex scenes, soft-porn variety, whose noisiness is exceeded only by their unconvincingness); its story, littered with intriguingly repellent characters, like Kai Proctor (Ulrich Thomsen), local evil tycoon, grows ever more enticing". The San Francisco Chronicle said about Banshee, "It has a solid pedigree. It's also part of Cinemax's effort to expand its original programming. That effort pays off with 'Banshee'". The Pittsburgh Post-Gazette wrote, "it's the characters of Banshee and their labyrinth of relationships that make the show an engrossing, entertaining portrait of a fictional small town." The A.V. Club included season three on its list of the best TV of 2015, describing it as "upping the emotional stakes to almost unbearable levels."

Banshee has also had less favorable reviews. A Boston Herald critic described the series as a "slow-pokey drama punctuated by shocking violence and sex".

=== Ratings ===
Season one of Banshee drew Cinemax's then-highest ratings for an original series, averaging 433,000 viewers per episode and 727,000 in the 7 days after each episode was released. The season finale drew 455,000 viewers during its initial screening and 655,000 during its repeat, the largest audience ever, at the time, for a Cinemax original series, and the third-highest ratings achieved by Banshee at that point.

The second season exceeded the first's successes. The season's fifth episode, "The Truth about Unicorns", set a series record with 591,000 viewers during its original airing. The season finale also set a new record, with 733,000 viewers, and a total of 968,000 for the evening including repeat showings.

=== Accolades ===
Armen V. Kevorkian won the award for Outstanding Special Visual Effects at the 65th Primetime Creative Arts Emmy Awards.

== Other media ==
A soundtrack album, Banshee – Music from the Cinemax Original Series, was released as digital download on February 11, 2014. The album features 17 songs from the show's first two seasons, including the main theme by Methodic Doubt, and tracks by artists including Nico Vega, Ivy Levan, The Growl, Anders Osborne, Fred Eaglesmith, and Martin Harley.
