= Warrior (TV series) =

American television series

- Genre: Action; Crime drama; Historical drama; Martial arts
- Created by: Jonathan Tropper
- Based on: The writings of Bruce Lee
- Showrunner: Jonathan Tropper
- Starring: Andrew Koji; Olivia Cheng; Jason Tobin; Dianne Doan; Kieran Bew; Dean Jagger; Joanna Vanderham; Tom Weston-Jones; Hoon Lee; Langley Kirkwood; Christian McKay; Perry Yung; Joe Taslim; Dustin Nguyen; Céline Buckens; Miranda Raison; Chen Tang; Maria Elena Laas; Chelsea Muirhead; Mark Dacascos; Adam Rayner
- Composers: Reza Safinia; H. Scott Salinas
- Country of origin: United States
- Original languages: English; Cantonese
- No. of seasons: 3
- No. of episodes: 30

Production
- Executive producers: Jonathan Tropper; Justin Lin; Danielle Woodrow; Shannon Lee; Andrew Schneider; Richard Sharkey
- Production locations: Cape Town, South Africa
- Running time: 44–66 minutes
- Production companies: Tropper Ink Productions; Perfect Storm Entertainment; Bruce Lee Entertainment

Original release
- Network: Cinemax
- Release: April 5, 2019 – December 4, 2020
- Network: Max
- Release: June 29 – August 17, 2023

Warrior (Chinese: 戰士) is an American martial arts crime drama television series that premiered on April 5, 2019, on Cinemax. It is based on an original concept and treatment by Bruce Lee, and is executive-produced by his daughter, Shannon Lee, and film director Justin Lin. Jonathan Tropper, known for the Cinemax original series Banshee, is the showrunner.

In April 2019, Cinemax renewed the series for a second season which premiered on October 2, 2020. It was Cinemax's final series before ceasing production of original programming. In April 2021, the series was renewed for a third season, along with the announcement that the series would move to HBO Max, later rebranded to Max. The third season premiered on Max on June 29, 2023. In December 2023, the series was canceled after three seasons.

== Plot ==
Set during the Tong Wars in late 1870s San Francisco, the series follows Ah Sahm, a martial arts prodigy who emigrates from China in search of his sister, only to be sold to one of the most powerful tongs in Chinatown.

== Cast ==
=== Main ===
- Andrew Koji as Ah Sahm, a Chinese martial arts expert from Foshan who travels to San Francisco in search of his elder sister, Xiaojing, who emigrated years prior.
- Olivia Cheng as Ah Toy, a madam who runs a brothel in Chinatown and is adept at wielding the dao.
- Jason Tobin as Young Jun, Father Jun's son and successor who befriends Ah Sahm and is skilled with throwing knives.
- Dianne Doan as Mai Ling, the wife of Long Zii, the head of the Long Zii Tong. Formerly known as Xiaojing, she is Ah Sahm's elder sister who fled China to escape her abusive husband, the warlord Sun Yang, whom she was forced to marry to save her brother's life. She acts as the de facto leader of the Long Zii.
- Kieran Bew as Bill "Big Bill" O'Hara, an Irish police officer promoted to lead the Chinatown squad. He is former friends with Dylan Leary, as both men were Union soldiers during the American Civil War. Due to his gambling problems, he is often in trouble with both the Chinese and Irish gangs.
- Dean S. Jagger as Dylan Leary, an American Civil War veteran, labor unionist, and leader of the Workingmen's Party of California. He loathes the Chinese, whom he blames for taking away jobs that he believes are meant for the Irish.
- Joanna Vanderham as Penelope Blake (seasons 1–2), the wife of Samuel Blake, the mayor of San Francisco. She and her husband do not get along, as she only married him to save her father's failing business. She later falls in love with Ah Sahm after he saves her life.
- Tom Weston-Jones as Richard Henry Lee, a new police officer from Savannah, Georgia. He is disliked by his Irish colleagues, who are Union veterans, due to his family having fought for the Confederacy. Despite being from the South, he is much more racially tolerant compared to his peers.
- Hoon Lee as Wang Chao, a black market salesman who acquires various contraband for the Tongs and the San Francisco police. Because of his connections, he is free to travel throughout all of the Tongs' territories and even serves as a mediator between them. It is later revealed that he was enslaved for a time in Cuba.
- Langley Kirkwood as Walter Franklin Buckley, the Deputy Mayor of San Francisco who secretly conspires with Mai Ling to start a gang war between the Hop Wei and the Long Zii.
- Christian McKay as Samuel Blake (seasons 1–2), the Mayor of San Francisco and Penelope's husband. Despite espousing anti-Chinese views to gain the support of his constituents, he secretly frequents Ah Toy's brothel to be serviced by both male and female Chinese prostitutes.
- Perry Yung as Father Jun, the leader of the Hop Wei Tong and Young Jun's father.
- Joe Taslim as Li Yong, a skilled martial artist who serves as the Long Zii's chief enforcer. He is Ah Sahm's main rival and Mai Ling's lover.
- Dustin Nguyen (Note: Despite being credited amongst the main cast, Nguyen only appears in one episode of the third season.) as Zing (seasons 2–3; recurring season 1), the new leader of the Fung Hai Tong and Mai Ling's ally.
- Céline Buckens as Sophie Mercer (season 2), Penelope's reckless younger sister who seeks to gain Leary's attention.
- Miranda Raison as Nellie Davenport (seasons 2–3), a wealthy widow who owns a large vineyard in Sonoma that offers asylum to Chinese migrants, particularly prostitutes. She later becomes romantically involved with Ah Toy.
- Chen Tang as Hong (seasons 2–3), an abrasive, young new recruit brought over from China as part of reinforcements for the Hop Wei. He quickly befriends Young Jun and Ah Sahm when they come to his defense after he is ridiculed for being homosexual. He often fights with a chain that he wears as a necklace.
- Maria-Elena Laas as Rosalita Vega (season 2), a resilient Mexican woman who runs illegal fighting tournaments on the Barbary Coast, which Ah Sahm frequents.
- Chelsea Muirhead as Yan Mi (season 3), the daughter of a printing shop owner, who seeks to settle her father's debt to the Hop Wei by aiding Ah Sahm.
- Mark Dacascos as Kong Pak (season 3), the former leader of the Jiang Yao Tong, which is assimilated into the Long Zii, and an old friend of Li Yong.
- Adam Rayner as Douglas Strickland (season 3), a railroad baron who receives a contract from the U.S. government to build on Nellie's land.

=== Recurring ===
- Rich Ting as Bolo (season 1), a former railroad worker ("coolie") turned underground fighter who was saved by Father Jun. He serves as the Hop Wei's primary muscle and assassin.
- Henry Yuk as Long Zii (season 1), the elderly leader of the Long Zii tong and Mai Ling's husband.
- Robert Hobbs as Stone, a police officer under Bill's command as part of the Chinatown Squad.
- Jacques Bessenger as McLeod (seasons 1–2), another of the police officers in the Chinatown Squad.
- Nicholas Pauling as Harrison, another of the police officers in the Chinatown Squad.
- David Butler (Note: Butler receives an in memorium plaque at the end of the episode "Exactly the Wrong Time to Get Proud" following his death in 2021.) as Russell Flanagan (seasons 1–2), San Francisco's chief of police.
- Graham Hopkins as Byron Mercer (season 1), Penelope and Sophie's father and the owner of a steel mill.
- Kenneth Fok as Jacob (seasons 1–2), Penelope's loyal Chinese manservant.
- Emily Child as Lucy O'Hara, Bill's wife and mother of their children.
- Brendan Sean Murray as Jack Damon (season 1), an Irish debt collector working for the Fung Hai.
- Jenny Umbhau as Lai, a young girl from the Shandong province who aids Ah Toy on her missions. Like Ah Toy, she is skilled with the dao.
- André Jacobs as Lymon Merriweather (season 2; guest seasons 1, 3), a wealthy businessman who frequently deals with the Mayor.
- Martin Munro as Leonard Raice (season 2; guest seasons 1, 3), a corrupt reporter with ties to Buckley.
- Frank Rautenbach as Leonard Patterson (season 2; guest season 1), Ah Toy's business partner who serves as her frontman when purchasing land
- Gaosi Raditholo as Abigail (season 3; guest season 2), an African American bartender who seduces and drugs Lee, and becomes romantically involved with him later on.
  - Raditholo also plays Nora (seasons 1–2), Lee's deceased lover from Georgia.
- Nat Ramabulana as "Happy Jack" (season 3; guest season 2), the African American leader of a drug trafficking ring on the Barbary Coast who enters into a partnership with Young Jun and Ah Sahm.
- Neels Clasen as Benjamin Atwood (season 3), the ruthless new police chief from New York City and a former Union Army Colonel.
- Sean-Marco Vorster as Stewart Gumm (season 3), Buckley's conniving campaign manager and right-hand man.
- Jazzara Jaslyn as Eliza Pendleton (season 3), a wealthy socialite who befriends Mai Ling.
- Kevin Otto as Horace Clark (season 3), Bill's brother-in-law who owns a successful cement factory.
- Gary Young as Yichèn (season 3), Yan Mi's sick father and the owner of a printing shop who is in debt with the Hop Wei.
- Angelo Chen as Zimo (season 3), Yan Mi's brother who works with his father in a printing shop.
- Nick Cordileone as Edmund Moseley (season 3), a special agent in the Secret Service tasked with hunting down stolen printing plates.
- Telly Leung as Marcel (season 3), a nightclub singer who Hong becomes enamoured with.
- Colin Moss as Franklin Thayer (season 3), Buckley's political rival in the San Francisco mayoral campaign.
- Dominique Maher as Catherine Archer (season 3), a political booster who seeks to support Buckley's campaign.
- Sizo Mahlangu as Isaac (season 3), Happy Jack's right-hand man.

=== Guest ===
- Christiaan Schoombie as Harlan French (season 1), the leader of a gang of bandits.
- C. S. Lee as Lu (season 1), a former coolie and co-owner of a saloon that Ah Sahm and Young Jun take shelter in.
- Erica Wessels as Billie (season 1), Lu's wife and co-owner of their saloon.
- Andrew Stock as Father Flynn (season 1), a priest who helps defend Lu's saloon from bandits.
- Rachel Colwell as Wankeia (season 1), a Native American prostitute Young Jun falls in love with.
- Patrick Baladi as Robert Crestwood (seasons 1–2), an anti-Chinese Senator who seeks to become president.
- Lim Yu-Beng as Zan (season 1), a slaver who sells Lai to Ah Toy.
- Henry Kwok as Lao Ting (season 1), a Chinese businessman who ships people from China to the US.
- James Lew as Li Qiang (season 1), a kung fu Sifu who trained Ah Sahm in his youth.
- Michelle Allen as Claire (season 2), a prostitute and the mother of Wang Chao's illegitimate daughter.
- Emmanuel Castis as Clyde Nichols (seasons 2–3), an ex-Pinkerton agent hired by Mai Ling to gather information on Buckley.
- Paolo Wilken as Lao Che (season 2), the leader of the low-level Suey Sing Tong.
- Conor Mullen as Elijah Rooker (season 2), a rich business tycoon and owner of Rooker's Mill, a border town where he hosts fighting tournaments.
- Michael Bisping as Dolph Jagger (season 2), an aggressive fighter who participates in the tournament at Rooker's Mill.
- Maria Elisa Camargo as Marisol Rooker (season 2), Elijah's wife and, secretly, Rosalita's sister.
- Christos Vasilopoulos as Smits (season 2), Rooker's head of security.
- Brad Kelly as "Cleaver" (season 2), one half of a hitman duo that Patterson hires to kill Ah Toy.
- Jason William Day as "Hammer" (season 2), the other half of the hitman duo that Patterson hires.
- Patrick Buchanan as Tully (season 2), an Irishman who leads an angry mob on a rampage in Chinatown.
- Trevor Ou Tim as Wu Jin (season 3), one of the elder councilmen in the Long Zi.
- Morné Visser as Killy Donahue (season 3), the father of Conor and Garrett who asks Leary to bail out his sons.
- Matthew Vey as Conor Donahue (season 3), a young Irish worker, who gets into trouble with his brother.
- Ross van der Walt as Garrett Donahue (season 3), a young Irish worker and Conor's brother.
- Brett Chan (Note: Chan also serves as the main stunt coordinator) as Muchen (season 3), the leader of the low-level Three Brothers Tong, who refuses to assimilate into the Long Zii.
- Jandre Le Roux as Shaw (season 3), Strickland's bodyguard and right-hand man.
- Armand Aucamp as Bernard Pendleton (season 3), Eliza's rich husband who works for the Bank of California.
- Chris Mark as Sicheng (season 3), a Chinese immigrant held for deportation, whom Young Jun has an encounter with.
- Charlie Bouguenon as Lukas (season 3), a German gangster and an old associate of Father Jun who uses Chinese labor to harvest silver.
- Francois Coetzee as Christoph (season 3), Lukas's brother and vicious right-hand man.
- Shannon Lee (Note: Lee also serves as an executive producer) as Wen (season 3), a Chinese laborer in Lukas's camp along with her son.
- Sven Ruygrok as Carter (season 3), Lee's kindhearted cousin.
- Julian Place as Bo (season 3), Lee's vengeful cousin.
- Patricia Boyer as Violet (season 3), Lee's aunt who seeks vengeance from him for killing her sons.
- Jason Wong as Ming Yu (season 3), the owner of a brothel under Long Zi protection, who wants to regain his prostitutes who were previously liberated by Nellie.

== Episodes ==
Season	Episodes	Originally released		
Season	Episodes	First released	Last released	Network
1	10	April 5, 2019	June 7, 2019	Cinemax
2	10	October 2, 2020	December 4, 2020	Cinemax
3	10	June 29, 2023	August 17, 2023	Max

=== Season 1 (2019) ===
No. overall	No. in season	Title	Directed by	Written by	Original release date	U.S. viewers (millions)
1	1	"The Itchy Onion"	Assaf Bernstein	Jonathan Tropper	April 5, 2019	0.157
While defending another Chinese migrant, Ah Sahm gains the attention of Wang Chao, a black market salesman who takes him to meet Father Jun, the leader of the Hop Wei tong. Elsewhere, police officer Richard Lee arrests a pair of Irishmen for murdering two Chinese laborers. Lymon Merriweather, the employer of the two victims, pressures Mayor Samuel Blake to protect his workers. In response, the Mayor commissions a Chinatown police squad under the command of veteran officer Bill O'Hara, which Lee joins. Father Jun's son, Young Jun, is nearly abducted from a brothel by the rival Long Zii tong before Ah Sahm comes to his rescue. Later, Ah Sahm encounters Li Yong, the Long Zii's enforcer, and discovers that his sister is now married to the leader of the Long Zii and goes by the name Mai Ling. Distraught, Ah Sahm visits the brothel and has sex with the madam, Ah Toy. As Ah Sahm sleeps, Ah Toy kills the two recently bailed Irishmen who are revealed to be part of the Irish Mob. That same night, Mai Ling secretly meets with Deputy Mayor Walter Buckley and promises him that peace between the tongs will not occur in Chinatown.
2	2	"There's No China in the Bible"	Loni Peristere	Jonathan Tropper	April 12, 2019	0.114
A group of Long Zii attempt to smuggle opium behind the Hop Wei's back but are killed after a bribed policeman snitches to the Hop Wei. Despite the attack, Long Zii wishes to make peace and form an alliance with the Hop Wei to unite the tongs before the Chinese Exclusion Act is passed, unaware that Mai Ling secretly works with the Deputy Mayor to stoke war between the tongs. The Mayor's wife, Penelope, is attacked by two drunk Irishmen and saved by Ah Sahm. However, Ah Sahm is arrested by Bill in spite of protests by Penelope and Lee. She asks the Mayor for help but he refuses out of fear of alienating his anti-Chinese white voters and because of Ah Sahm's association with the Hop Wei. Penelope then pleads with Ah Sahm to defend himself in court, but he refuses knowing the police want to pin the blame of the two Irishmen killed by Ah Toy on him as well. Elsewhere, Ah Toy cuts out the tongue of one of her prostitutes for being a Long Zii informant, and Li Yong kills the policeman who snitched to the Hop Wei.
3	3	"John Chinaman"	Loni Peristere	Adam Targum	April 19, 2019	0.146
At court, Ah Sahm is falsely charged with provoking an attack on the two Irishmen. Irish Mob boss Dylan Leary sends his men to attack Ah Sahm in jail, only for the latter to defeat them. Ah Sahm calls out Bill for aiding the Irish Mob which causes Bill to change his opinion of Ah Sahm. The next day, the charges against Ah Sahm are dropped when the Irishmen fail to appear at court after Mai Ling threatens to kill their family. This causes an angry mob to form, which the Mayor subdues by promising swift action against the tongs. Ah Sahm is able to sneak out with help from Bill and Wang Chao, with the latter giving Ah Sahm a message from Mai Ling, who tells him to leave San Francisco. Ah Sahm returns to the Hop Wei where he is given a hero's welcome party, only to be later punished by Father Jun due to his actions. Later that night, Ah Sahm visits Penelope at her home where she thanks him for saving her, and an angry Leary orders the two Irishmen and their family to leave San Francisco before his gang sets fire to their house.
4	4	"The White Mountain"	David Petrarca	Kenneth Lin	April 26, 2019	0.147
Bill is beaten by his old friend and former police officer, Jack Damon, who has been hired by the Fung Hai tong to ensure all Irishmen, even cops, repay their debts; giving Bill three weeks. Ah Sahm and Penelope confide in each other and begin an affair. Lee's opinion of Bill worsens when he witnesses Bill accepting bribery from Ah Toy during a surprise police raid at her brothel. Mai Ling has Wang Chao set up a meeting with the leader of the Fung Hai, who she kills with poison. Despite this, his successor, Zing, agrees to form an alliance with her. As Deputy Mayor Buckley spreads anti-Chinese propaganda to the press, Mai Ling gives Ah Sahm a ticket to return to China, warning him it will be her last offer of goodwill before the war between the tongs begins. Ah Sahm rips the ticket and promises that this time he will be the one to save her.
5	5	"The Blood and the Sh*t"	Kevin Tancharoen	Kenneth Lin	May 3, 2019	0.138
Ah Sahm and Young Jun are tasked by Father Jun with transporting a coffin from Nevada to San Francisco. The stagecoach driver warns the passengers that the horses are weary, forcing them to stay overnight at a saloon owned by a former Chinese and his American wife. During their stay, Young Jun falls in love with Wankeia, the saloon's Native American prostitute. Later, the saloon is robbed by a gang of outlaws led by Harlan French, but he is forced to flee after Ah Sahm and Young Jun fight off and kill his gang. Ah Sahm discovers that the dead body in the coffin is stuffed with smuggled gold and that it is Harlan's true target. Knowing that Harlan will want revenge after he brings the rest of his gang, Ah Sahm and Young Jun work together with the saloon owners and the surviving passengers to face them. Later that night, Harlan's gang raid the saloon only to be killed by its defenders. The next morning, Ah Sahm and Young Jun say their goodbyes and return to San Francisco on horseback.
6	6	"Chewed Up, Spit Out, and Stepped On"	David Petrarca	Evan Endicott & Josh Stoddard	May 10, 2019	0.090
An assassination attempt on Father Jun during the Chinese New Year parade ends up killing many people, including a white woman. Senator Robert Crestwood, a Chinese Exclusion Act supporter who hopes to become the next US President, uses the woman's death as publicity to garner support and enact harsher laws against the Chinese. Young Jun learns from Wang Chao that the attack on his father was perpetrated by the Fung Hai and their new allies, the Long Zii. In retaliation, Young Jun, Ah Sahm and Bolo attack the Fung Hai's casino and send a warning to the Long Zii. Later, Long Zii meets with the recovered Father Jun to apologize for his subordinates' actions, offering compensation with hopes of maintaining the truce between their tongs. However, Father Jun makes clear that he will only accept peace in exchange for Long Zii's life. Meanwhile, Bill asks for Leary's help in paying his debts to Damon, who agrees only after learning that Damon is working for the Fung Hai. Leary challenges Damon to a fist fight and brutally beats him as punishment for working with the Chinese, then forces Bill to kill Damon to protect his family, leaving Bill traumatized.
7	7	"The Tiger and the Fox"	Lin Oeding	Brad Caleb Kane	May 17, 2019	0.144
Penelope's father, Byron Mercer, reveals that their family's company will go bankrupt should he fail to secure the city's cable car contract. A bounty hunter from Georgia approaches Bill with the information that Lee is a wanted man and offers to split the bounty if he aids in Lee's capture. Bill confronts Lee who confesses that he killed his cousins after they murdered his black lover, Nora. Hearing this, Bill exiles the bounty hunter from the city and threatens to kill him should he return. When Ah Sahm learns that Father Jun has sent Bolo to kill Long Zii and Mai Ling, he rushes to the couple's hideout and fights Bolo, which results in Bolo's death. After Mai Ling tells Ah Sahm to flee, she kills Long Zii but promises him vengeance against the Hop Wei. Ah Toy buys a young girl from the same village as her, named Lai, from trafficker Zan. The next morning, the news of both Bolo and Long Zii's deaths reach Chinatown and the Hop Wei and Long Zii tongs prepare for war to avenge them.
8	8	"They Don't Pay Us Enough to Think"	Lin Oeding	Evan Endicott & Josh Stoddard	May 24, 2019	0.105
The Chinatown gang war leaves many people dead and injured, forcing Mayor Blake to back Senator Crestwood's anti-Chinese initiatives. Lao Ting of the Chinatown Business Association calls for a meeting between Father Jun and Mai Ling, in order to end the war between their tongs. The two agree to settle their differences over a duel between their best fighters: if the Hop Wei win, the status quo will be maintained, but if the Long Zii win, they will be allowed to transport opium in their territory. Ah Sahm agrees to represent the Hop Wei in the upcoming duel but becomes despondent when Penelope ends their relationship. Meanwhile, real estate mogul Victor Timmons and his partner Lance McCormick blackmails Ah Toy and her own business partner Leonard Patterson, extorting more money from them in exchange for allowing them to purchase land. When Timmons asks Patterson to betray Ah Toy and join him instead, Ah Toy kills Timmons then dumps his body into the sea.
9	9	"Chinese Boxing"	Loni Peristere	Jonathan Tropper	May 31, 2019	0.176
The duel between Li Yong and Ah Sahm sees the former ultimately victorious, allowing the Long Zii to trade opium in their territory. Banished from the Hop Wei by Father Jun, Ah Sahm is taken in and nursed by Ah Toy; as he heals, reminiscing his sister introducing him to Sifu Li Qiang, who teaches him Kung Fu. Ah Toy informs Ah Sahm how Mai Ling planned to allow him to die in the ring. Later, Ah Sahm is visited by Penelope and Young Jun, with the latter informing him that he is disallowed from joining another tong under the threat of death. Meanwhile, Deputy Mayor Buckley lies to Byron that another bidder has offered a cheaper price for the cable car project. This forces Byron to rescind his earlier promise to Leary of hiring only the Irish, instead replacing them with the cheaper Chinese workers. Lee is attacked by the Fung Hai to send a message to Bill for not repaying his debts.
10	10	"If You're Going to Bow, Bow Low"	Loni Peristere	Jonathan Tropper	June 7, 2019	0.117
A depressed Ah Sahm begins working for Penelope's father, but Chao refuses to believe he is broken. Guilt-ridden, Bill watches over a comatose Lee in the hospital and vows retribution against the Fung Hai. Instead, Zing offers Bill a deal: the Fung Hai will no longer target his family and friends in exchange for Bill becoming their new debt collector. After learning of the recent police crackdown on the tongs, Mai Ling confronts Zing for his attack on Lee. Zing reveals he only allied with Mai Ling to get into the opium trade and forces her to renegotiate their alliance when the Fung Hai surround the Long Zii headquarters. Young Jun invites Ah Sahm to rejoin the Hop Wei, only to be rejected. When Leary and his men attack Byron's factory, Ah Sahm is motivated to fight back. Ah Sahm and Leary spar but are interrupted by the arrival of police. Later, Penelope assumes control over her father's company when he suffers a heart attack during Leary's assault. Bill and a recovered Lee continue their patrol of Chinatown as Ah Sahm rejoins the Hop Wei.

=== Season 2 (2020) ===
No. overall	No. in season	Title	Directed by	Written by	Original release date	U.S. viewers (millions)
11	1	"Learn to Endure, or Hire a Bodyguard"	Jonathan Tropper	Jonathan Tropper	October 2, 2020	0.067
Hoping to sharpen his martial arts skills, Ah Sahm enters the fighting pits of the Barbary Coast run by Mexican businesswoman Rosalita Vega. There, Ah Sahm encounters the Teddy Boys, an anti-Chinese hate group. Despite his objections, Zing convinces Bill to continue working as the Fung Hai's debt collector when he is presented monetary compensation. Leary meets Penelope's younger sister, Sophie, and the two share a connection. Mayor Blake and Merriweather pressure Penelope to sell her father's company, though she remains adamant. Angered by Mai Ling and the Long Zii's expansion in Chinatown, Young Jun questions his father's direction for the Hop Wei and looks for a solo venture that will strengthen their tong. Ah Toy, Lai, and Ah Sahm kill a gang of Teddy Boys when they attempt to lynch a Chinese migrant. Chief Flanagan pesters Bill and Lee to find the killers, resulting in a raid on Wang Chao's shop. Later, Leary blows up a factory warehouse known for employing Chinese workers.
12	2	"The Chinese Connection"	David Petrarca	Brad Kane	October 9, 2020	0.073
With Rosalita's help, a hesitant Young Jun and Ah Sahm broker a deal with Happy Jack, a local drug smuggler. Senator Crestwood holds a rally announcing his bid for presidency and gains the support of the crowd with his anti-Chinese sentiments. Lee becomes addicted to laudanum when he uses it to offset his lingering head trauma. Penelope seeks to hire the Hop Wei to protect her factory workers but Ah Sahm declines. Bill and Lee look into the financial records of Ah Toy's business partner, Patterson, in hopes of finding the killer. Mai Ling hires Clyde Nichols, an ex-Pinkerton member, to spy on Deputy Mayor Buckley. When a member of the Suey Sing tong is caught dealing opium on Long Zii territory, Li Yong and Zing are dispatched to meet with their leader. Knowing the Suey Sing are lying about ceasing their opium operations, Zing and his men brutally massacre them in front of Li Yong. Ah Sahm and Young Jun finally accept Penelope's offer to guard her factory when they learn they can use it as storage for opium. Meanwhile, Wang Chao is revealed to have fathered a daughter with a white prostitute.
13	3	"Not How We Do Business"	David Petrarca	Brad Kane	October 16, 2020	0.048
The Mayor threatens to cancel the city's contract with Penelope if she refuses to stop hiring the Hop Wei. Patterson tells Ah Toy of his reservations about their partnership. Mai Ling confronts Zing and tells him not to impede on Long Zii business, cautioning him of the consequences. An awkward encounter has Bill rethinking his job for the Fung Hai, and tells Zing he's finished with repaying his debt. Nellie Davenport, a wealthy widow committed to ending the exploitation of young Chinese women in the sex trade, hosts a dinner for the social and political elite, including Penelope and the Mayor. Father Jun brings in new recruits from China to the dismay of Young Jun and Ah Sahm, though one of the new arrivals—Hong—intrigues them with his fighting skills. Wang Chao asks Mai Ling to intervene in a dispute with Zing, then schemes with Li Yong when she refuses. The Fung Hai attack Bill's family at his home.
14	4	"If You Don't See Blood, You Didn't Come to Play"	Loni Peristere	Evan Endicott & Josh Stoddard	October 23, 2020	0.078
In the aftermath of the attack, Lucy and the kids leave Bill, who confesses to Lee about his involvement with the Fung Hai. As the police prepare to raid the Fung Hai headquarters, Wang Chao informs Bill of his plan to frame Zing for Ah Toy's murders, convincing him to postpone the raid. Deputy Mayor Buckley urges Mayor Blake to strengthen his anti-Chinese stance, arguing that the attack on a police officer's family means he can no longer appear soft on the Chinese. Nellie visits Ah Toy's brothel and emancipates a worker who chooses to leave. Penelope warns the Mayor that he cannot pull the city's contract without facing legal repercussions. While guarding the factory, Ah Sahm and Leary debate over their respective people's place in America, the Irishman showing some measure of respect for the Chinaman afterwards. The Mercer sisters quarrel over Penelope's use of Chinese labor at the expense of poor Irishmen. Angry with her sister, Sophie aids Leary in blowing up her family's factory while Wang Chao has Ah Toy hand over her sword in his effort to frame Zing for the murders.
15	5	"Not for a Drink, a F*ck, or a G**damn Prayer"	Loni Peristere	Evan Endicott & Josh Stoddard	October 30, 2020	0.093
Penelope examines the remnants of her father's factory and discovers the Hop Wei's opium storage. Ah Toy visits Nellie's winery which leaves her awestruck at the tranquility and happiness of the former sex workers. Later, Ah Toy and Nellie talk and share a passionate kiss. Mayor Blake visits the Mercer factory and reminds Penelope of her legal obligations under the city's contract. Wang Chao delivers Zing's weapons order while Li Yong infiltrates the Fung Hai headquarters. Zing suspects Chao's plot and has him beaten into talking but is interrupted when the San Francisco police begin their assault. Li Yong and Zing engage in a brief fight, ending with Li Yong escaping and Zing being implicated as the swordsman responsible for the murders. Chao extricates his daughter from her mother and leaves her in Nellie's care. Mai Ling visits the Barbary Coast and attempts to apologize to Ah Sahm for ordering his death, but he rejects it, stating that while he will not kill her, he will make her suffer. With their opium storage destroyed, Ah Sahm accepts Rosalita's offer to fight at Rooker's Mill and recoup the losses from he and Young Jun's failed business venture.
16	6	"To a Man with a Hammer, Everything Looks Like a Nail"	Dustin Nguyen	Jonathan Tropper & Brad Kane	November 6, 2020	0.083
Rosalita, Ah Sahm, Young Jun, and Hong travel to Rooker's Mill, a border town owned by fight promoter and tycoon Elijah Rooker. As they settle in their lodgings, Ah Sahm encounters Dolph Jagger, a premier prize fighter who easily wins his first match. Dolph continues his winning streak until Ah Sahm defeats him with one kick and goes on to win the tournament. Ah Sahm and Rosalita sleep together. Impressed by Ah Sahm's skills, Rooker invites Rosalita and Ah Sahm to lunch, where he asks Ah Sahm to stay at Rooker's Mill to train his men. As Ah Sahm declines, Rosalita reveals that Rooker killed her father and stole her family's land. After killing Rooker with his own gun, Rosalita and the Hop Wei trio are arrested and transported to Sacramento for trial. Rooker's wife, Marisol, intercepts their commute and frees them. She is actually Rosalita's sister, and they have taken back their father's land. As Rosalita pleads with Ah Sham to stay with her, Smits, Rooker's bodyguard, arrives and shoots her dead. Young Jun then kills Smits. At Chinatown, the trio are confronted by Father Jun and the Hop Wei council.
17	7	"If You Wait by the River Long Enough"	Omar Madha	Kenneth Lin	November 13, 2020	0.047
Young Jun and Ah Sahm convince the Hop Wei into accepting Young Jun as their new leader, forcing Father Jun to retire. Ah Toy tells Nellie of the land in her possession, which Nellie suggests they place in her trust. Zing is sentenced to death by hanging while the remaining Fung Hai battle for leadership. With information from Nellie, Ah Toy and Lai raid an underground brothel to liberate abused Chinese sex workers. The next day, Ah Toy transports them to Sonoma, leaving them and Lai in Nellie's care. Mai Ling's private investigator, Nichols, delivers intel on Deputy Mayor Buckley. A spurned Patterson seeks help from an outside source to maintain control over Ah Toy's land. Merriweather and the wealthy industrialists confront Mayor Blake of the ramifications of not using Chinese labor, threatening his future political prospects. A drunken Mayor returns home where a domestic argument with Penelope becomes physical. Penelope's Chinese manservant, Jacob, kills the Mayor when he attempts to strangle Penelope.
18	8	"All Enemies, Foreign and Domestic"	Omar Madha	Kenneth Lin & Evan Endicott & Josh Stoddard	November 20, 2020	0.068
Hoping to provoke Mai Ling into breaking the treaty, Ah Sahm and Young Jun dispose of the remaining Fung Hai, then hang the Hop Wei colors above their former headquarters. Chief Flanagan questions a stunned Penelope on who killed her husband, with Sophie confessing it was Jacob. Buckley, now the acting mayor, orders a curfew on Chinatown and a citywide manhunt for Jacob. Bill and Lee come to blows when Lee accuses Bill of planting evidence on Zing. Mai Ling asks Buckley to aid her in removing the Hop Wei from Chinatown in exchange for finding Jacob. Alone at her brothel, Ah Toy is attacked by assassins hired by Patterson. Severely injured but victorious, Ah Toy visits Patterson's home and forces him to relinquish all his claims to her land. Wang Chao discovers Jacob hiding in his shop.
19	9	"Enter the Dragon"	Dennie Gordon	Jonathan Tropper & Evan Endicott & Josh Stoddard	November 27, 2020	0.065
Under pressure from Mai Ling, Wang Chao tells her of Jacob's whereabouts. Mai Ling informs Buckley, and the police find and arrest Jacob. During the transport, a mob of Irishmen beat the police into submission and lynch Jacob. Sophie tries to stop the lynching, but she is knocked down. Unsatisfied, the angry mob rampage through Chinatown while Mai Ling and Chao seek refuge at Ah Toy's brothel. Witnessing the spread of violence, the Hop Wei and the Long Zii temporarily ally to stop the mob from destroying Chinatown. Lee and a reluctant Bill also aid the Chinese despite the mob's overwhelming numbers. As Chao and Ah Toy's bodyguard defend the brothel, Mai Ling tends to Ah Toy's injuries. Father Jun rescues Young Jun when he is nearly killed by a gunman at a washhouse. The San Francisco police arrive to end the riot while Sophie tells her sister of Jacob's death. Leary gathers the dead and injured Irish at his bar and Young Jun, Ah Sahm, and Hong collect Jacob's body for a send-off.
20	10	"Man on the Wall"	Dennie Gordon	Jonathan Tropper	December 4, 2020	0.080
Chinatown immortalizes Ah Sahm by painting a mural of him. Lee resigns from the police despite Bill's pleas and begins a relationship with barmaid Abigail. In an act of desperation, Mai Ling reveals to Young Jun that Ah Sahm is her brother. Stunned, Young Jun confronts Ah Sahm. After hearing Ah Sahm's story, Young Jun recognizes that he was in an impossible situation and forgives him but starts trusting him less. Ah Sahm challenges Leary to a fight and wins, warning him not to set foot in Chinatown. Father Jun departs San Francisco, leaving Wang Chao to watch over Young Jun in his absence. Lucy, worried for Bill after hearing about the riot, returns home and the two talk. Furious about Jacob's death and Buckley's manipulations, Penelope vows to expose his corruption. Buckley frames Penelope for stabbing him and has her committed to a mental hospital. Later, Mai Ling blackmails Buckley with a photo of him in the Confederate Army; he concedes to her wishes and has the city council plan the shutdown of the Hop Wei's operations. Later, Leary visits him and declares his stance as representative of the Irish Workingmen. On Alcatraz, Zing plans an escape from prison.

=== Season 3 (2023) ===
No. overall	No. in season	Title	Directed by	Written by	Original release date
21	1	"Exactly the Wrong Time to Get Proud"	Nima Nourizadeh	Jonathan Tropper	June 29, 2023
Tensions escalate following the Chinatown riots as the Long Zii break the peace treaty by selling opium in Hop Wei territory. As a result, Ah Sahm takes action, causing another riot. City ordinances cause the Hop Wei to collect overdue protection money in order to survive economically. Young Jun slaps an old man at a printer's shop to Ah Sahm and Hong's disapproval. Bill attempts to reconcile with his wife, claiming he will be promoted to Chief of police. Mai Ling and the Long Zii absorb the Jiang Yao Tong. Leary's agenda hits a roadblock at the city council meeting. A frustrated Young Jun lashes out at Chao for profiting off of Hop Wei's misery. Chao warns Ah Sahm about Young Jun's volatility and suggests they strong-arm a group of white men at the docks who Chao sold illegal firearms to solve their financial situation. Mayor Buckley announces a new chief of police. Chao introduces Mai Ling to the San Francisco women of high society. To Bill's disappointment, Lee is content staying with Abigail and not rejoining the force. At the dock, Chao, Young Jun, Ah Sahm, and Hong stumble across money printing plates.
22	2	"Anything Short of a Blow to the Head"	Dustin Nguyen	Brad Kane	June 29, 2023
Secret Service agents arrive in Northern California searching for the plates. Meanwhile, Young Jun, Ah Sahm, and Chao struggle to reproduce counterfeit currency. The old man at the printer's shop declines to get involved, while his daughter Yan Mi offers her services in exchange for a better deal for her family. Atwood, the new chief of police, turns out to be cruel. Mayor Buckley faces stiff opposition in the race for Mayor. Bounty hunters arrive at Abigail's. Abigail and Lee kill them. While helping dispose the bodies, Happy Jack discovers Lee is a wanted man. Mr. Merriweather summons Leary to the steel factory to deal with disgruntled Irish workers who refuse to work with Chinese Americans. A furious Leary meets with Buckley, who suggests he meet with Mr. Pierce, another lobbyist. Hong is enamored by a male singer. While attending a high society social event, Mai Ling sends Li Yong and Kong Pak to acquire the Three Brothers Tong. Douglas Strickland, an old friend of Nellie's husband, pays a visit and offers to buy her property. Nellie refuses and is informed the government will seize her land in order to develop a railway. Agent Mosley offers Lee a job.
23	3	"No Time for F*cking Chemistry"	Dustin Nguyen	Evan Endicott & Josh Stoddard	June 29, 2023
Young Jun, Hong, Ah Sahm, and Chao visit Happy Jack hoping to rectify past debts, and test if their fake money can deceive him. Strickland threatens Nellie with exposing her relationship with Ah Toy. Abigail tries to convince Lee to not take Mosley's job offer. Li Yong is uneasy about Mai Ling spending so much time with the San Francisco elite. Lee briefs the Chinatown squad on how to spot the fake bills. Leary attempts to intimidate Strickland, who is unfazed and has "muscle" of his own. He has a proposition for Leary. Buckley's aide Gumm leaks a damning story of candidate Thayer to the press. Flush with cash, the Hop Wei flaunt and spend a night at Ah Toy's. Ah Sahm vents to Chao on how the money is being used. Chao informs him Mai Ling is building an army. Hong spends the night with the singer. An angry Pierce stops by The Banshee to find out Leary has sided with Strickland. Ah Sahm and Yan Mi begin to bond. After Strickland fails to buy Nellie's land a second time, his men set fire to the vineyard and property. Nellie, Ah Toy, and Lai struggle to fight back against them.
24	4	"In Chinatown, No One Thinks About Forever"	Dinh Thai	Francisca X. Hu	July 6, 2023
As the vineyard continues to smoulder, Ah Toy informs Nellie she is returning to Chinatown with her girls where they will be better protected. Happy Jack warns Lee and Abigail bad things will happen if Lee continues working with the feds. Mosely and Lee route through local Chinese businesses searching for counterfeit bills. Donna wants Buckley to know she'll do anything to get him re-elected. Ah Toy returns to running the brothel. Bill declines Ah Toy's kick back as he informs her, the new chief is hell bent on cracking down on Chinatown. Chao notices Lee exiting the brothel. The court rules against Nellie, and declares eminent domain. Bernard makes a pass at Mai Ling. Strickland displays his influence and power over Leary. The San Francisco police raid Hop Wei headquarters and beat and arrest Young Jun. Escaping with the plates, a scared Yan Mi vents at Ah Sahm for putting her in danger, and later they have sex. Eliza has Mai Ling arrested for soliciting her husband for sex.
25	5	"Whiskey and Sticky and All the Rest Can Wait"	Dinh Thai	Lillian Yu	July 13, 2023
Mai Ling is arrested and not allowed visitation. Li Yong considers seeking help from the Six Companies, but they refuse due to Mai Ling's reckless financial decisions. Mayor Buckley discusses a new deportation center and faces competition in his campaign. Ah Sahm plans to rescue Young Jun from the center. Young Jun's escape plan with Father Jun is set. Mai Ling proposes a partnership with Ah Sahm. Bill quits the police force and tries to reconcile with Lucy. Ah Toy breaks up with Nellie. Young Jun and Father Jun are released. Ah Sahm confronts Young Jun about the partnership with Mai Ling. Lee and Mosely confront Chao, and Happy Jack and Isaac attack them.
26	6	"A Soft Heart Won't Do You No Favors"	Brett Chan	Evan Endicott & Josh Stoddard	July 20, 2023
Mai Ling and Li Yong meet with Young Jun and Ah Sam outside of Hop Wei territory in an ice factory, and all agree on operating the money printing business from there. Chao and Lee are transported in a train to Georgia, in chains. Father Jun, Ah Sam and Young Jun travel east to make a deal with German gangsters. Abigail confronts Happy Jack about Lee's disappearance. The German gangsters kill a thief young boy and put his corpse on display for the town to see. This angers Ah Sam, and with Father Jun and Young Jun, he goes back to the Germans for revenge. Aunt Violet, Bo, and Carter beat Chao and Lee. Chao escapes, but later returns to save Lee, and they kill everyone. Lee is remorseful about killing Carter, and Chao helps him bury the dead.
27	7	"Gotta Be Crooked to Get Along in a Crooked World"	Dennie Gordon	Glenise Mullins	July 27, 2023
28	8	"You Know When You're Losing a Fight"	Dennie Gordon	Hoon Lee	August 3, 2023
29	9	"All of Death Is a Going Home"	Loni Peristere	Brad Kane	August 10, 2023
30	10	"A Window of F*cking Opportunity"	Loni Peristere	Story by : Jonathan Tropper; Teleplay by : Evan Endicott & Josh Stoddard & Danielle DiPaolo	August 17, 2023

== Production ==
In 1971, Bruce Lee developed a concept for a television series titled Ah Sahm, about a martial artist in the American Old West. However, Lee had difficulty pitching the series to Warner Bros. and Paramount. According to Lee's widow, Linda Lee Cadwell, Warner Bros. retooled and renamed Lee's concept into Kung Fu, starring David Carradine in the lead role. Warner Bros. stated that they had already begun developing a similar concept, created by writers and producers Ed Spielman and Howard Friedlander, which was later confirmed by Fred Weintraub's memoir and Matthew E. Polly's authoritative biography. According to these sources, Bruce Lee was not cast in the lead role in part because of his ethnicity, but more so because of his accent.

In 2015, Perfect Storm Entertainment and Bruce Lee's daughter, Shannon Lee, announced that the series would be produced and would air on Cinemax, and that filmmaker Justin Lin would serve as co-producer with Lee. Production began on October 22, 2017, in Cape Town, South Africa, at Cape Town Film Studios. The first season featured ten episodes and premiered on April 5, 2019.

Fight choreography was created by Brett Chan as the main stunt coordinator who is also the second unit director, with Johnny Yang and Jason Ng serving as assistant stunt coordinators. Both Chan and Yang are members of the Hitz International stunt team, though Nomad Stunts and Titan Stunts also performed choreography for the series.

On April 24, 2019, Cinemax renewed the series for a second season. It was Cinemax's final original series before ceasing production of original programming. In January 2021, both seasons began streaming on HBO Max. With the cancellation on Cinemax and the uncertainty of renewal, fans created a petition asking for a third season of the series. The petition received over 68,000 signatures as of April 2021.

On April 14, 2021, the series was renewed for a third season, along with the announcement that it would move to HBO Max. In an interview with The Ringer regarding the third season, showrunner Jonathan Tropper mentioned that "We like to pick historical events and then distill them through the Warrior prism into something that is still fact-based but doesn't become a documentary." Tropper further mentioned that prior to the series being renewed that "the interior sets are gone and have to be rebuilt". Production for the third season began on July 18, 2022, in Cape Town, and finished at the end of October 2022. The third season premiered on June 29, 2023. On December 18, 2023, Max canceled the series after three seasons.

== Release ==
The first season premiered on Cinemax on April 5, 2019. The second season premiered on October 2, 2020. The third season premiered on Max on June 29, 2023.

=== International broadcast ===
In the United Kingdom, the first season premiered on June 25, 2019, on Sky One. The second season premiered on October 14, 2020. In Australia, the first season premiered on June 12, 2019, on Fox8. In Canada, both seasons are available for streaming on Crave. The third season premiered on Max on June 29, 2023, with three new episodes. In February 2024, all three seasons were made available to stream on Netflix.

=== Home media ===
The first season was released on DVD and Blu-ray in October 2019.

== Reception ==
=== Critical response ===
On review aggregator Rotten Tomatoes, the first season holds an approval rating of 79% based on 24 reviews, with an average rating of 7.6/10. The site's critical consensus reads, "Though it often buckles under the weight of its lofty ambitions and ideological pedigree, Warrior's devil-may-care attitude provides thrilling energy and action that will please those looking for a period drama with a little kick." On Metacritic, it has a weighted average score of 68 out of 100, based on 9 critics, indicating "generally favorable reviews". Rolling Stone magazine named Warrior one of the best new television shows of 2019.

The second season has a 100% approval rating on Rotten Tomatoes based on 6 reviews with an average rating of 9/10.

The third season has a 100% approval rating on Rotten Tomatoes based on 11 reviews with an average rating of 8.5/10.

=== Ratings ===
As of April 2021, Warrior was ranked among the top 15 most viewed series on HBO Max.

=== Awards and nominations ===
Warrior was nominated for two Critics' Choice Super Awards at the 1st Critics' Choice Super Awards.

Year	Association	Category	Nominee	Result	Ref.
2019	Primetime Emmy Award	Outstanding Main Title Design	John Likens, Wesley Ebelhar, and Arisu Kashiwagi	Nominated	
2020	Young Entertainer Awards	Best Guest Starring Actress - Television Series	Nicole Law	Nominated	
2021	Critics' Choice Super Awards	Best Action Series	Warrior	Nominated	
2021	Critics' Choice Super Awards	Best Actor in an Action Series	Andrew Koji	Nominated	
2021	Visual Effects Society Awards	Outstanding Supporting Visual Effects in a Photoreal Episode	Jonathan Alenskas, Leah Orsini, Nate Overstrom, David Eschrich (for "Learn to Endure, or Hire a Bodyguard")	Nominated	
2021	Creative Arts Emmy Awards	Outstanding Stunt Coordination	Brett Chan	Nominated	

== Historical references ==
- Ah Toy is loosely based on the Chinese American madam Ah Toy.
- Dylan Leary is loosely based on the California labor leader Denis Kearney.
- Nellie Davenport is loosely based on the sex slavery abolitionist Donaldina Cameron.
- Deputy Mayor Buckley is likely loosely based on late 19th- and early 20th-century San Francisco political boss Christopher Augustine Buckley.
- In the first episode, the names of two police officers, Stone and Keller, are mentioned as potential members of the Chinatown task force. Lieutenant Mike Stone and Inspector Steve Keller were the lead characters during the first four seasons of the police drama series The Streets of San Francisco.
- The riot in the second season is largely based on the real-life Los Angeles Chinese massacre of 1871 and the San Francisco riot of 1877, both part of the larger historic anti-Chinese violence in California.

== Bibliography ==
- Lee, Linda (1975a). Bruce Lee: The Man Only I Knew. Warner Paperback Library. ISBN 0-446-78774-4.
