= Stephen Maybell =

American politician (1844–1919)

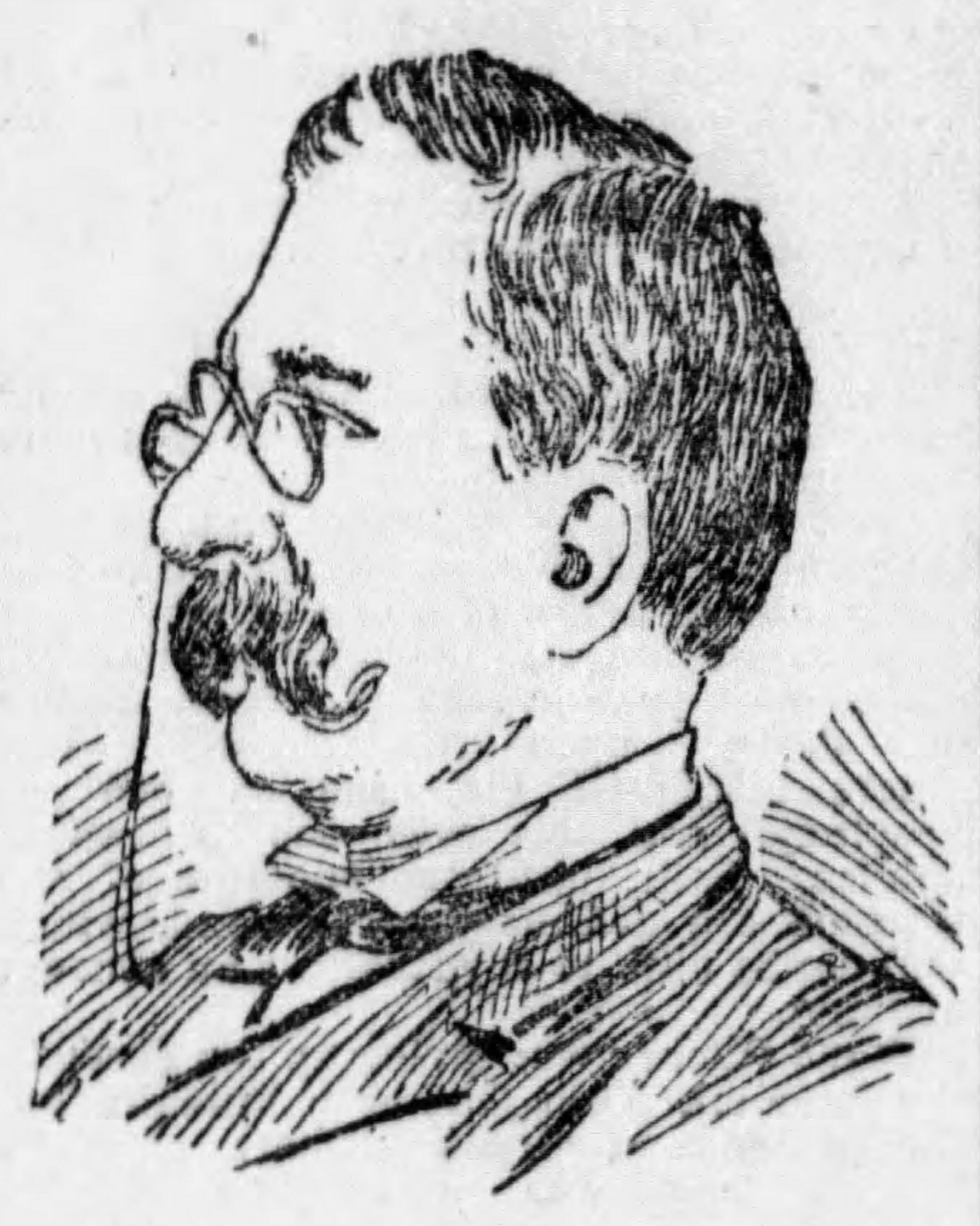
- Maybell c. 1892

Member of the California State Assembly from the 13th district
- In office January 5, 1880 – January 3, 1881
- Preceded by: Multi-member district
- Succeeded by: Multi-member district

Personal details
- Born: October 1844 New York City, U.S.
- Died: November 30, 1919 (aged 75) Oakland, California, U.S.
- Party: Workingmen's (1879–1881); Greenback (1880–1882)
- Spouse(s): Mary Jane Cook (m. 1870; div. 1892) Mary Hanson (m. 1892)
- Children: 2
- Occupation: Poet, politician, priest
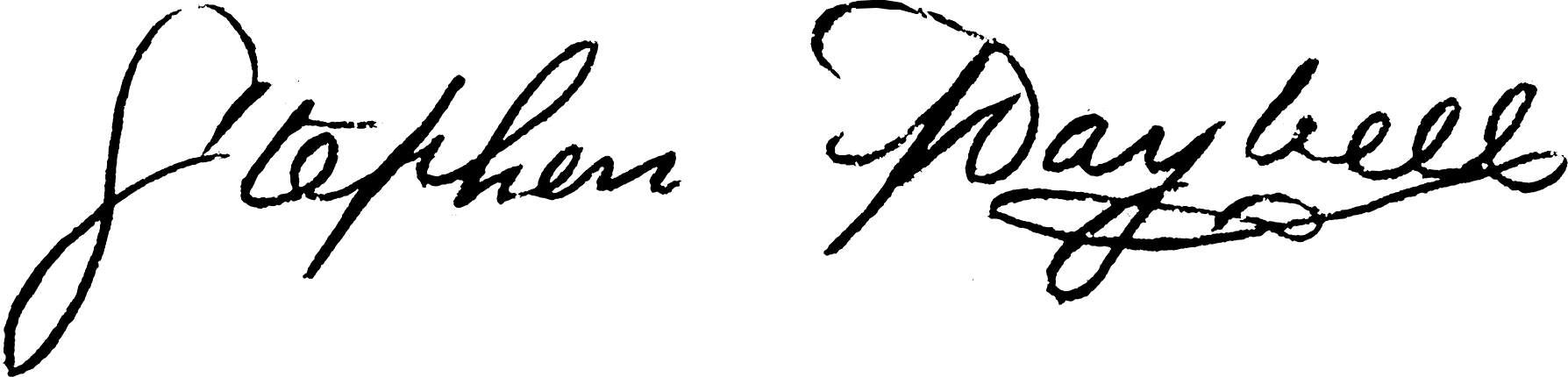
- Signature

Stephen Jefferson Maybell (October 1844 – November 30, 1919) was an American lather, poet, politician and priest who served in the California State Assembly from 1880 to 1881. During the Panic of 1893, he founded the Army of the Kingdom of Heaven at Hand, a religious sect that sought to recruit the unemployed for a march on Washington, D.C. Though the movement was unsuccessful, it is notable for predating Coxey's Army by several months.

== Political career ==
=== State Assembly ===
Known as a powerful orator and "the laureate of the Chinese-must-go crowd," Maybell was elected to the California State Assembly in 1879 on the Workingmen's Party ticket. He served on the Committees on "Indian Affairs, Public Morals, Labor and Capital" and "Chinese Immigration and Emigration." He was a Greenback-Labor Party candidate for Congress in 1880 and 1882, receiving less than 2% of the vote in the first race and less than 1% in the second.

=== Mooneysville ===
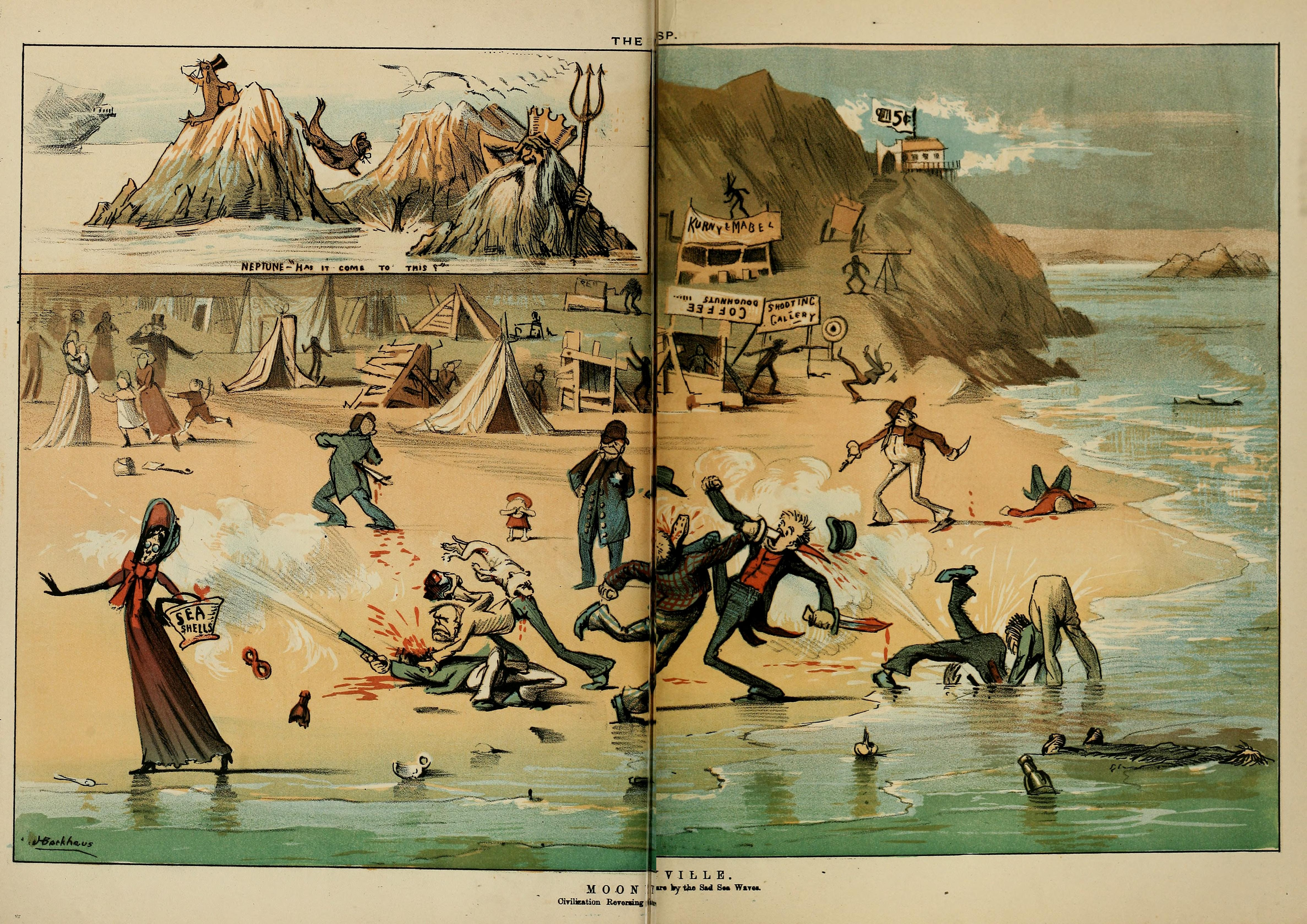
A satirical depiction of Mooneysville by Henry Barkhaus published in The Wasp, January 26, 1884

In December 1883, the Park and Ocean Railroad Company (owned by the Big Four's Central Pacific Railroad) obtained a fifty-year franchise to build a railroad across Golden Gate Park along Ocean Beach. Protesting the underhanded tactics used by the company to override then-mayor Washington Bartlett's veto of the franchise, Maybell and fellow "sand-lotters" Con Mooney and Denis Kearney staked their own illegal claims along the beach. To attract squatters, Kearney and Mooney offered drinks and dancing while Maybell ran a coffee and doughnuts stand. Other entrepreneurs soon followed, and the settlement came to be known as "Mooneysville."

Within days, Mooneysville boasted dozens of stands and thousands of visitors, drawing the ire of parks commissioner Frank M. Pixley. By the time he issued an eviction notice in January 1884, the settlement resembled an actual town, with a hardware store, a candy factory, a bakery, a chop house, several wells and pumps, a lumberyard, and fifteen saloons. However, when he sent twenty-five laborers backed up by seven policemen to clear out Mooneysville, they faced little resistance. For his part, Kearney let the laborers disassemble his shack for him, giving them orders as they worked.

=== Socialism ===
Maybell was involved with the American socialist movement as early as 1889, when he published Civilization Civilized, or, The Process of Socialism. Described as "the philosopher's stone for the removal of all human ills" and "next to Bellamy, the greatest propaganda work in the socialist movement," the book sold thousands of copies and was lauded by the Appeal to Reason. In 1898, Maybell pledged half of the proceeds of his latest book, Science of the Millenium, to the socialist Equality Colony in Skagit County, Washington, even offering his home and printing office to residents passing through San Francisco. His works were later cited by the likes of Charles H. Vail and Bolton Hall.

== Personal life ==
On October 13, 1870, Maybell married Mary Jane Cook in Santa Clara, California, with whom he had two children. He divorced her in 1892 and shortly after married Mary "May" Hanson, assistant commander of the Army of the Kingdom of Heaven at Hand. This reportedly disgusted one of his children, Claude, so much that he moved across the country to Brooklyn, New York, where he became a cartoonist.

== Illustration gallery ==
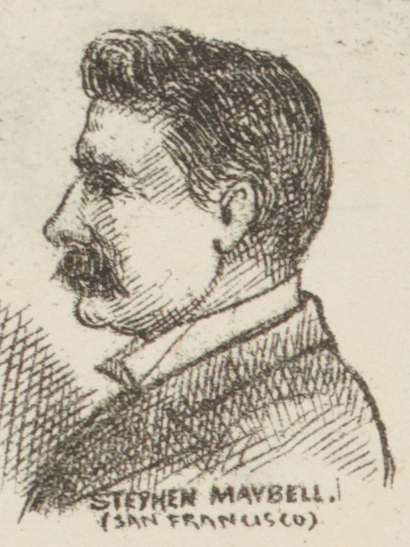
1880 sketch by Carl Browne

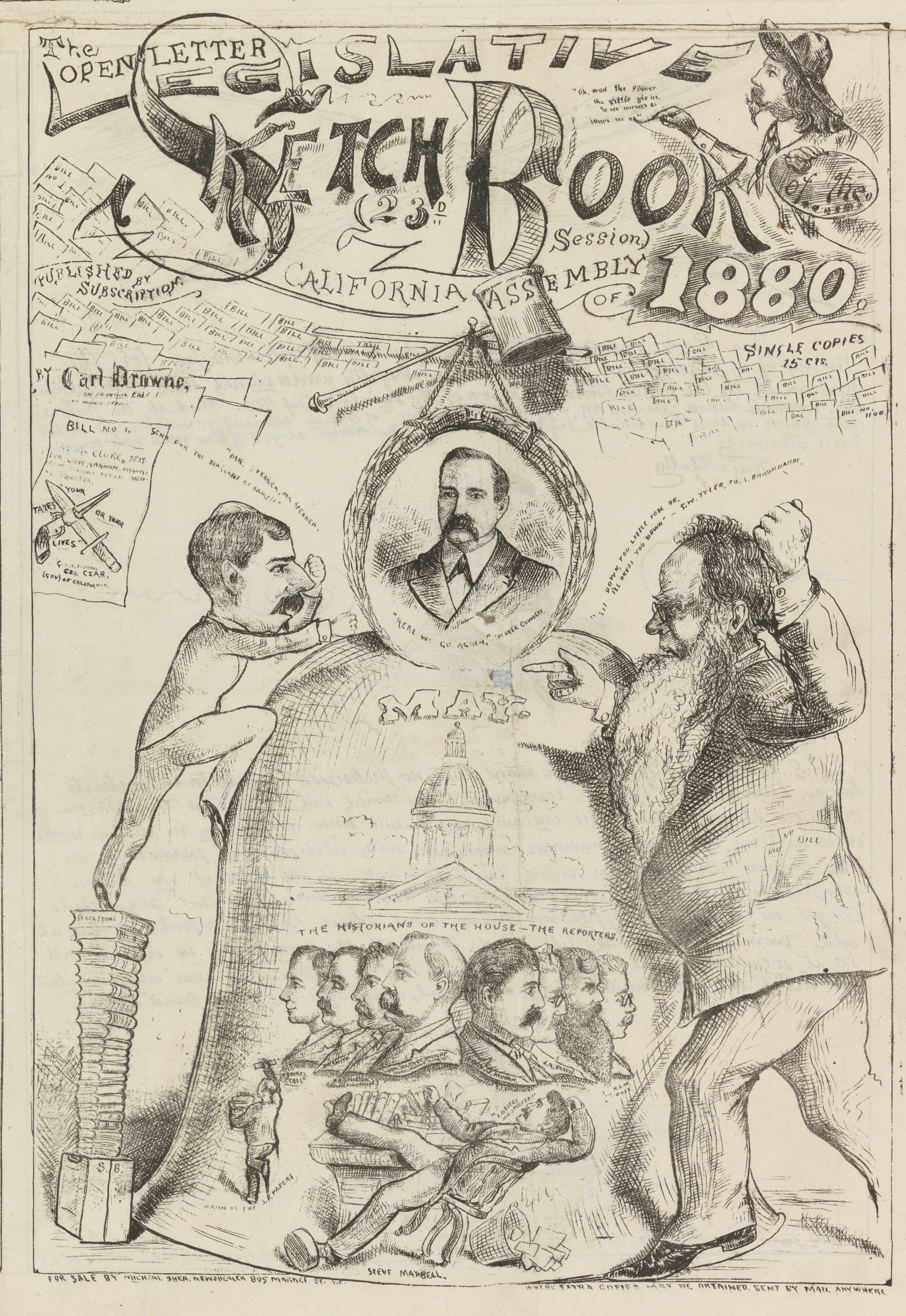
The Open Letter Legislative Sketch Book, 23d Session, California Assembly of 1880

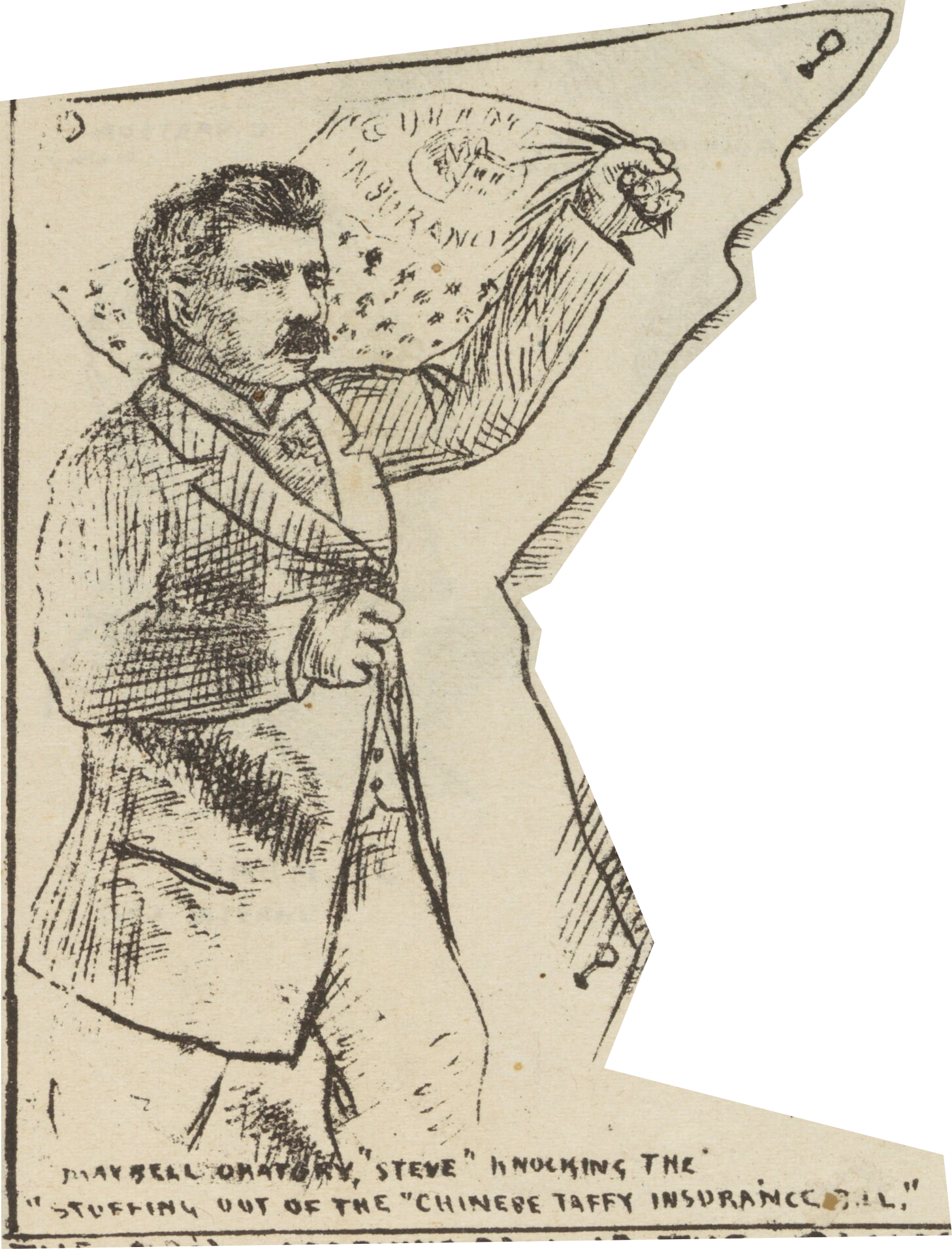
"Maybell Oratory"

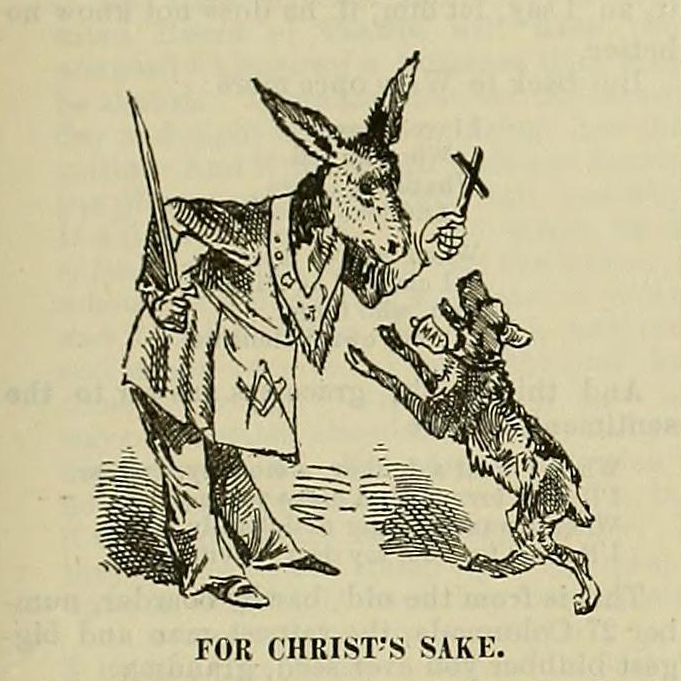
"For Christ's Sake"

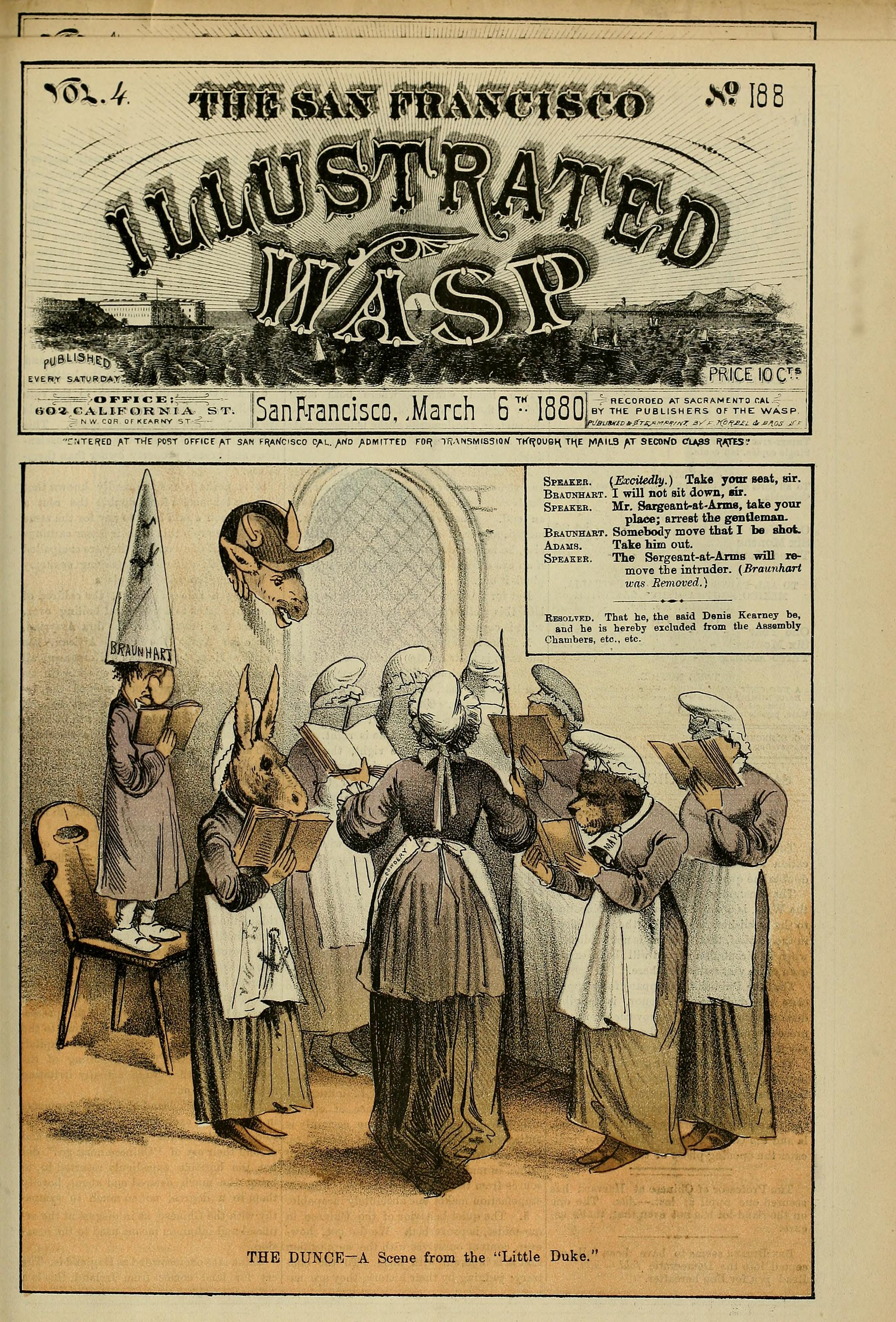
"THE DUNCE—A Scene from the 'Little Duke'"

"The Builders of the Tower of Babel--- The Confoundment To Follow"

"The Result of Insolence--- The Confusion of Tongues"

"Free Board... n-try at Drill"

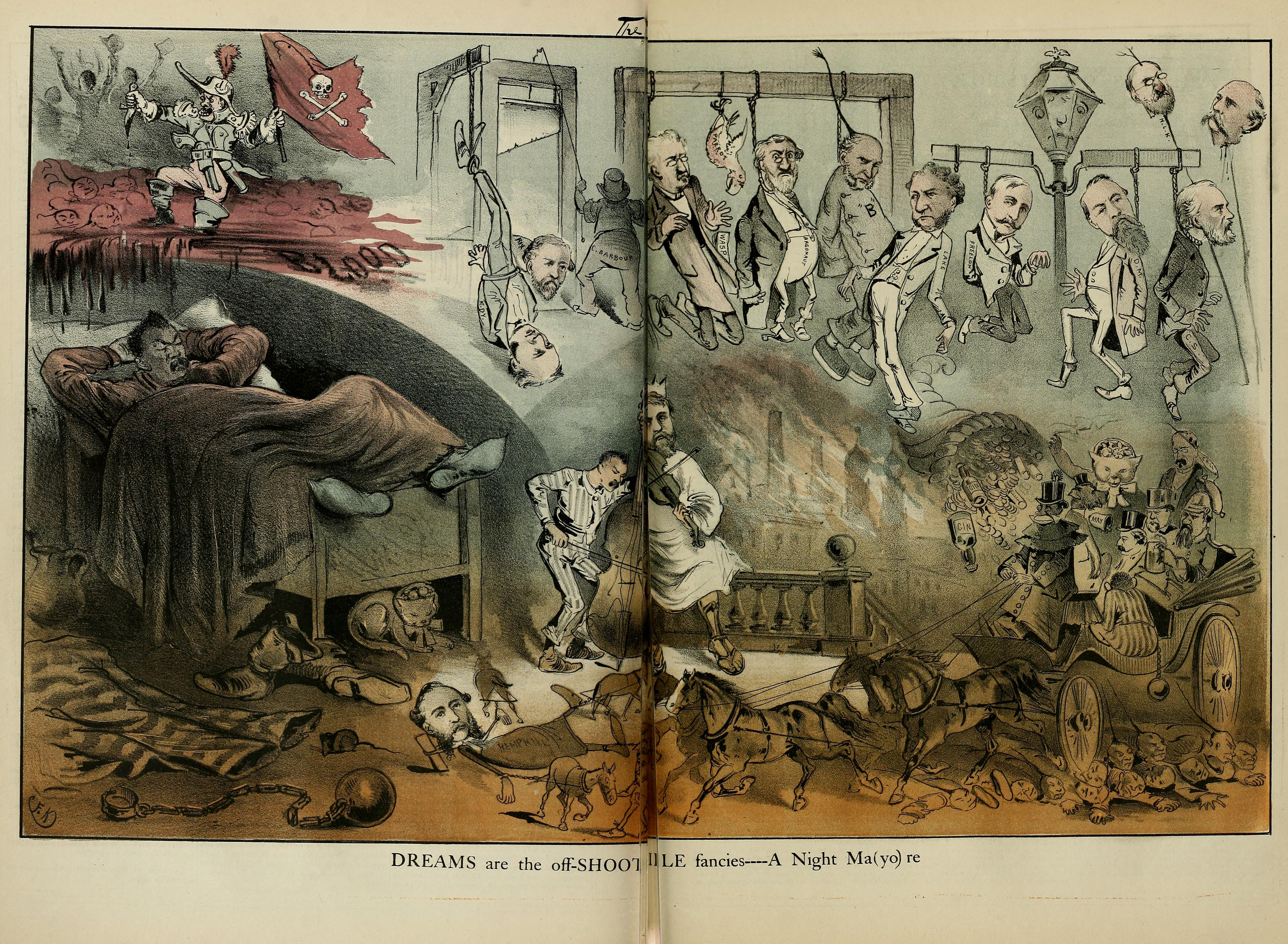
"DREAMS are the off-SHOOT... fancies----A Night Ma(yo)re"

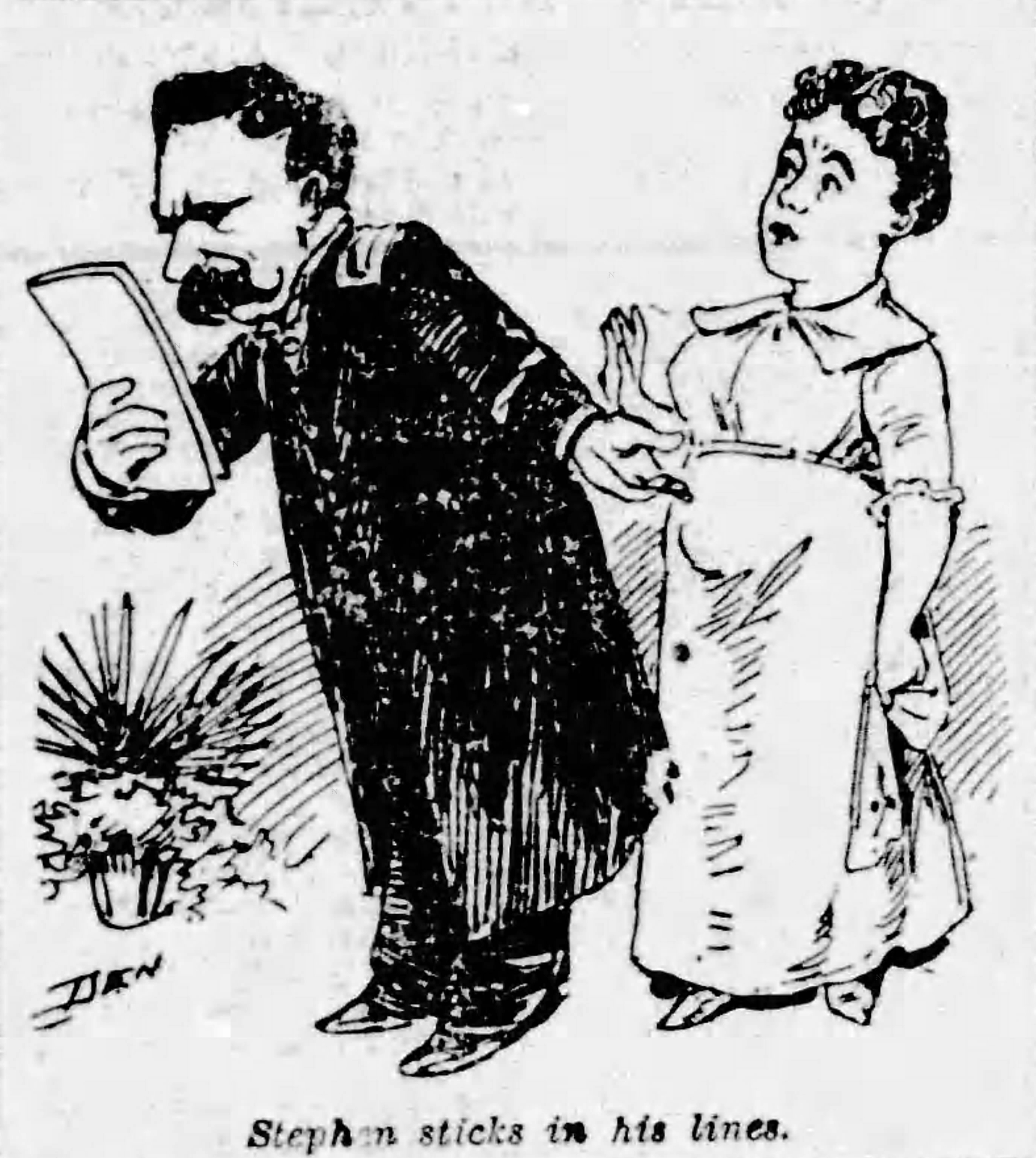
"Stephen sticks in his lines"

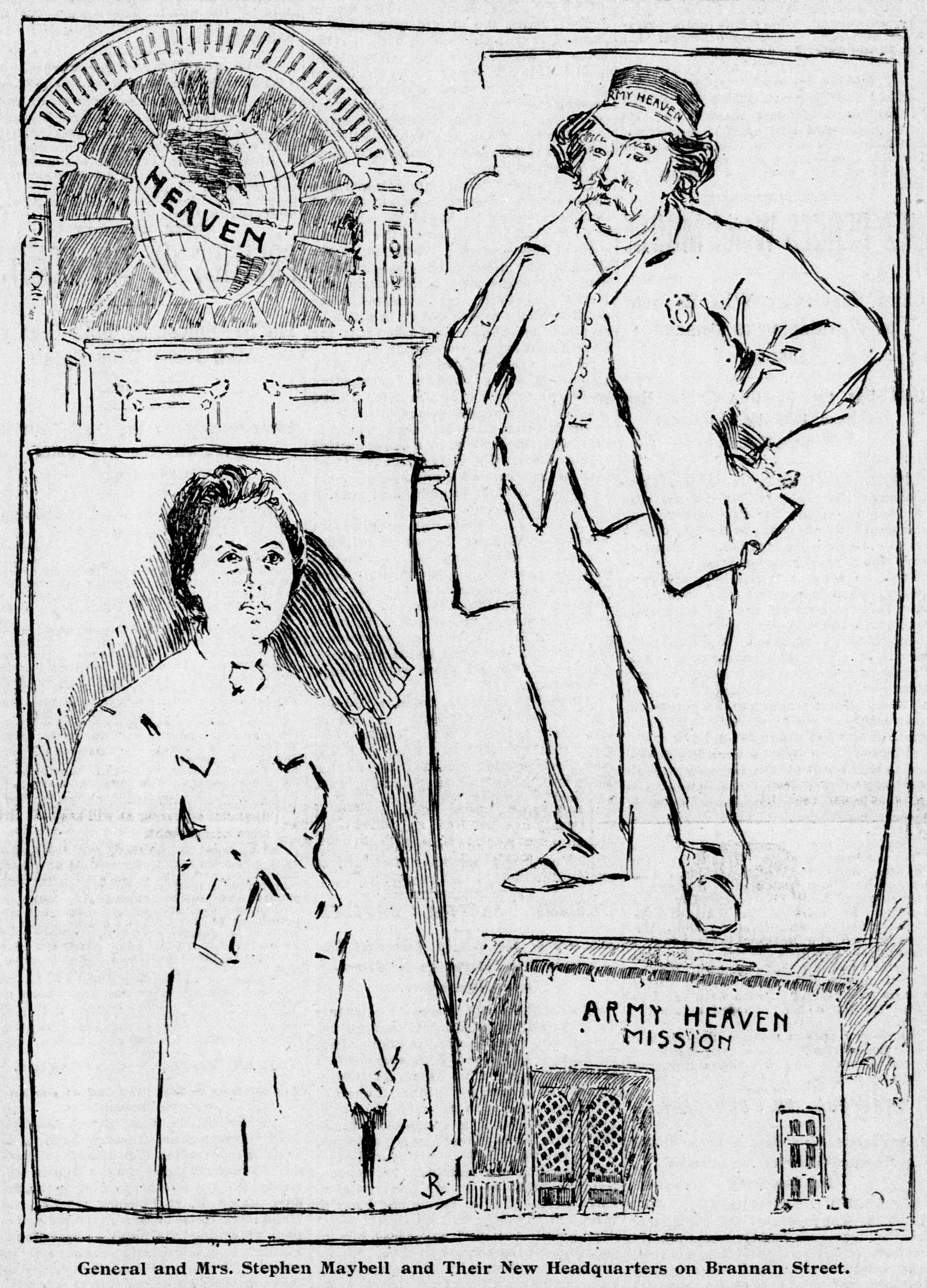
"General and Mrs. Stephen Maybell and Their New Headquarters on Brannan Street"

== Works ==
=== Books ===
- Civilization Civilized, or, The Process of Socialism. Denver: R. A. Southworth. 1889. (Reprint)
- Land Currency, A Treatise on the Important Subject of No Tax. San Francisco: Langton & Company. 1890.
- Civilization Civilized, or, The Process of Nationalization. New York: Lovell, Gestefeld & Company. 1892.
- Science of the Millenium. San Francisco: Stephen and Mary Maybell. 1897.
- The Mystery of Civilization. San Francisco: Stephen and Mary Maybell. 1899.

=== Articles ===
- "Labor's Declaration of Independence." Girard: Appeal to Reason, 1902.
- "What's the Matter?" Girard: Appeal to Reason, 1915. (Reprint)
