= Denis Kearney =

Irish-born American demagogue (c. 1840s–1907)

- Kearney c. 1878
- Born: February 1, 1847; Oakmount, County Cork, Ireland
- Died: April 24, 1907 (aged 60); Alameda, California, U.S.
- Occupations: Drayman and labor organizer
- Political party: Workingmen's (1877–1881)
- Other political affiliations: Greenback (1880, 1884); Democratic (1880)
- Spouse: Mary Ann Leary (m. 1870)
- Children: Maggie; William; Mildred; Denis Jr.; Ella

Denis Kearney (February 1, 1847 – April 24, 1907) was an Irish-born American labor leader who was active in the late 19th century and was known for his anti-Chinese activism. Called "a demagogue of extraordinary power," he frequently gave long and caustic speeches that focused on four general topics: contempt for the press, for capitalists, for politicians, and for Chinese immigrants. A leader of the Workingmen's Party of California, he is known for ending all of his speeches with the sentence "And whatever happens, the Chinese must go" (a conscious imitation of Carthago delenda est).

Kearney was part of a short-lived movement to increase the power of the working class, but after a few years his increasingly vitriolic language and his repeated arrests for inciting violence alienated many of those whom he was trying to influence. When the economy grew stronger in the early 1880s, Kearney faded from public notice. He became a wealthy stockbroker and landowner, running an employment agency where he worked until his health began to fail around 1900. He died in Alameda, California, in 1907.

== Early life ==
Kearney was born in Oakmount, County Cork, Ireland on February 1, 1847. The second of seven sons, he left home after his father died when he was just 11 years old. He became a cabin boy on the clipper ship Shooting Star, and by his own account he "circumnavigated the globe." He arrived in San Francisco in 1868 and married an Irish woman named Mary Ann Leary in 1870. Two years later he started a drayage business.

Census records list a daughter, Maggie, was born in 1871. Two years later he became a U.S. citizen. A son, William, was born in 1873, and another daughter, Mildred (or Amelia), was born in 1875. He later had another son, Denis Jr., and a third daughter, Ella. By 1877 his business was so well established that he owned five wagons and hauled goods throughout the city.

== Political career ==
=== Workingmen's Party leader ===
That same year, Kearney entered into the public arena when he challenged a city-backed monopoly on carting and hauling. As part of this effort he helped to start a loosely organized association of laborers, which within a year's time grew into the Workingmen's Party of California. For several years the Workingmen's Party would provide a forum for Kearney to speak before growing crowds of unemployed people in San Francisco. At first his speeches focused on uniting the poor and the working class while attacking the greed of big business, especially the railroads. He thought of himself as a "workingman's advocate", although he remained highly critical of unions throughout his life and frequently denounced strikes.

Hubert Bancroft, author in the late 1880s of an influential history of California, considered the Workingmen's Party to be "ignorant Irish rabble, even though that rabble sometimes paraded the streets as a great political party." Kearney's Irish immigrant background made him subject to frequent accusations that he was a foreign agitator. Middle class critics, fearful of Kearney's radical rhetoric and pledges, questioned whether Irish immigrants—embodied by Kearney—should have the right to dictate social policy in San Francisco. The Argonaut, the newspaper founded and published by the former Attorney General of California, Frank Pixley, said:

When an organization, composed almost entirely of aliens, who are themselves here by the sufferance of a generous hospitality, band themselves together in defiance of the law to drive out a class, who, however objectionable, have the same legal rights as themselves, it is an act of insolent audacity that ought to move the indignation of every honest man.

=== Labor organizer and orator ===
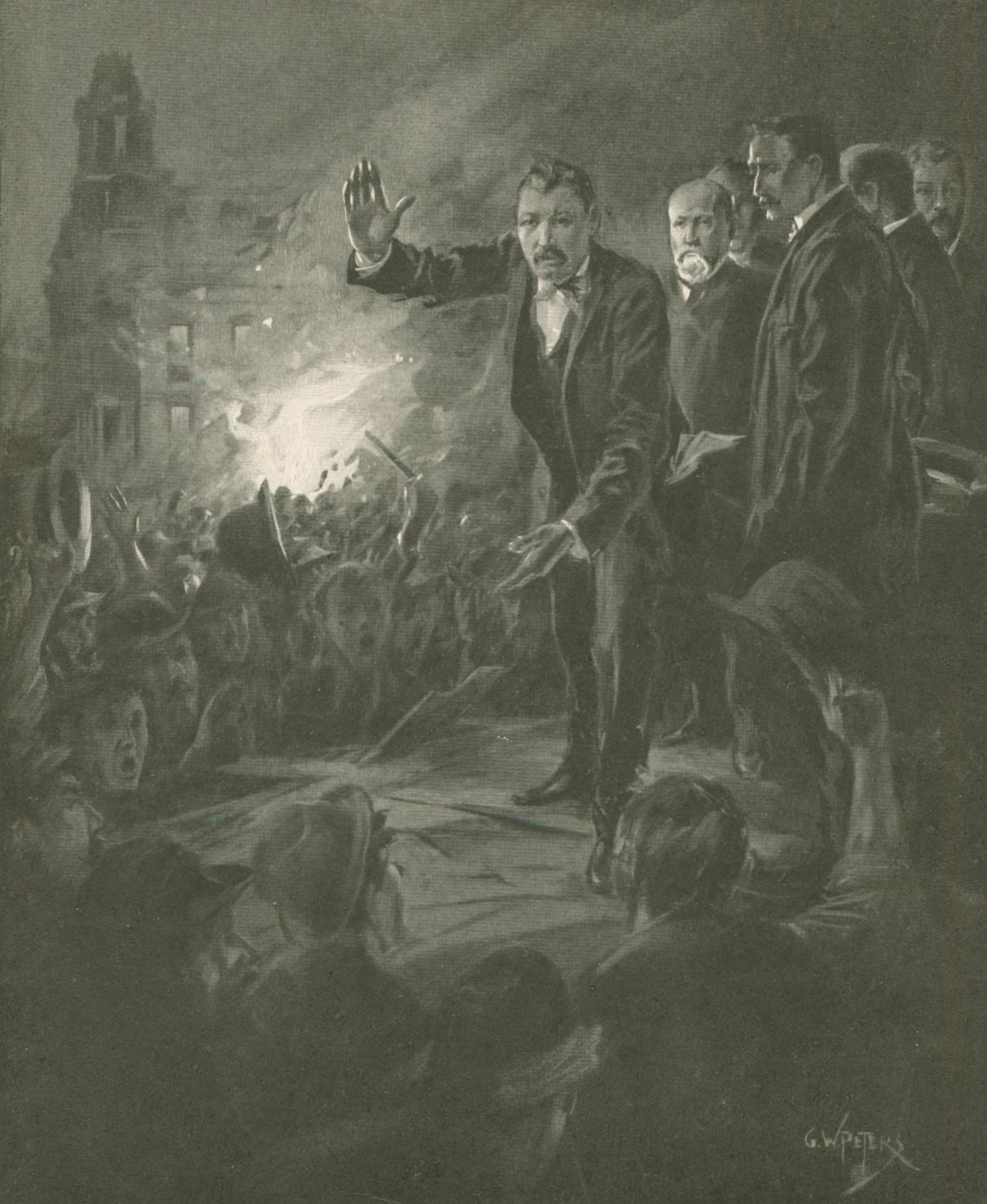
"Dennis Kearney addressing a meeting of sand lotters," painting by G. W. Peters

In spite of growing criticism, Kearney's popularity increased. At an outdoor gathering place near San Francisco City Hall known as "The Sandlot" he regularly spoke in front of crowds that numbered as many as 2,000 people. Observers said he had a natural ability to stir up crowds, and since his speeches often lasted as long as two hours he had plenty of opportunity to incite the audience. One of his trademarks was to gradually increase the volume of his speech until it reached fever pitch, then dramatically throw off his coat and unbutton his collar. Such gestures "always provoked a storm of applause."

Kearney never attended school, but he was a prolific reader and loved to engage in debates. He attended a club in San Francisco known as the Lyceum of Self-Culture, where he sharpened his speaking skills at weekly forums. One of his contemporaries described him as "temperate in everything but speech." He was said to speak forcibly, and when he wanted to make a point he used words "like a missile." The Boston Globe said "Mr. Kearney has power, and his power is that of the kind which to be appreciated must be seen and heard. It cannot be properly described."

In some of his speeches Kearny did not hesitate to urge people to take violent actions against politicians and other leaders. He frequently urged people to take immediate retribution on politicians who broke promises. "Shoot the first man that goes back on you after you have elected him intelligently;" he said, "see that you hunt him down and shoot him." In another speech he declared "Before I starve in this country I will cut a man's throat and take whatever he has got ... The Workingmen's Party must win, even if it has to wade knee deep in blood and perish in battle."

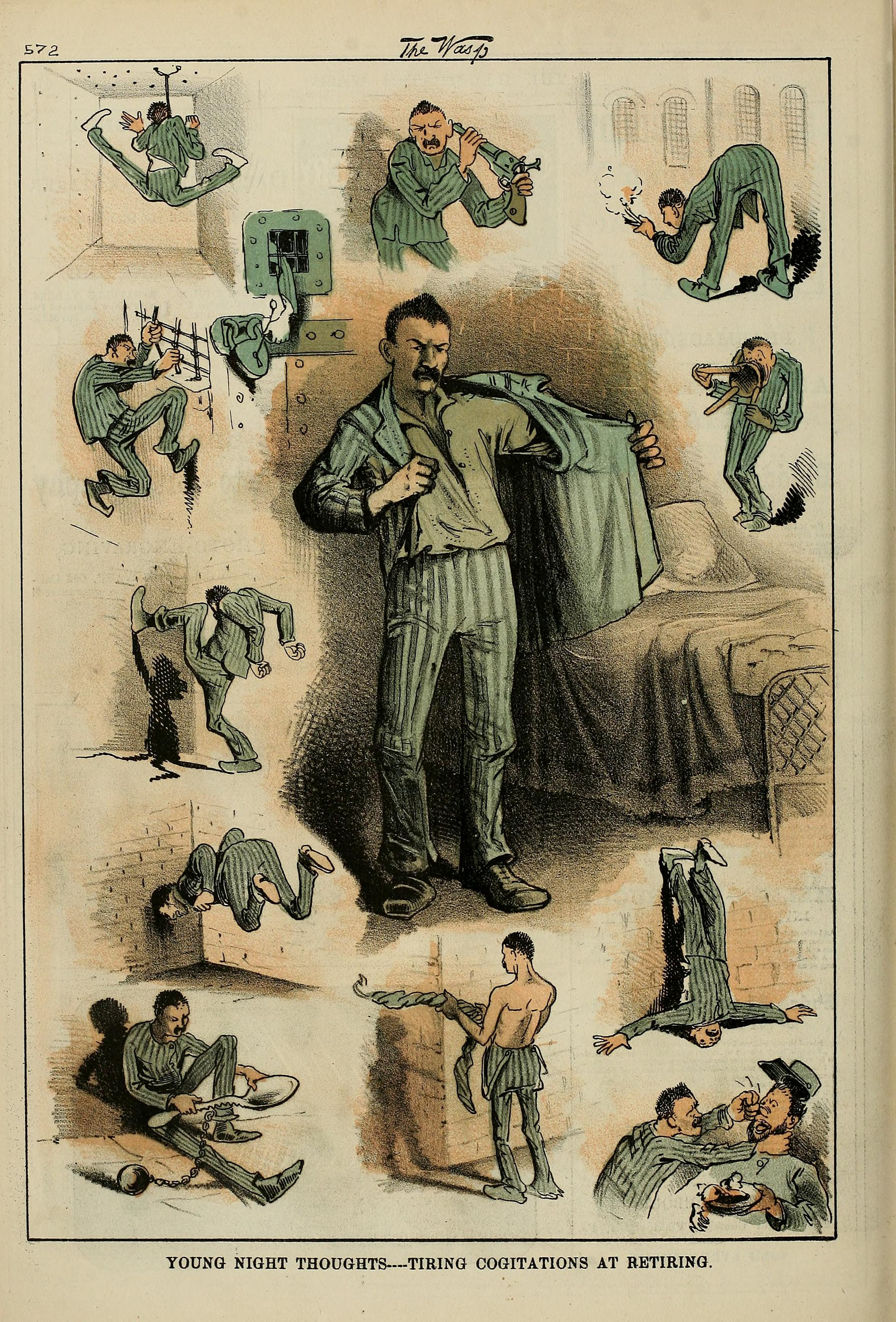
"Young Night Thoughts----Tiring Cogitations at Retiring," a cartoon published in The Wasp depicting various ways Kearney could attempt to escape from jail or kill himself, May 8, 1880

Although Kearney was arrested several times for inciting violence, he was always released when charges were either dropped or no one would testify against him. His arrests only served to further his popularity and increase the membership in the Workingmen's Party.

=== Anti-Chinese immigration agitator ===
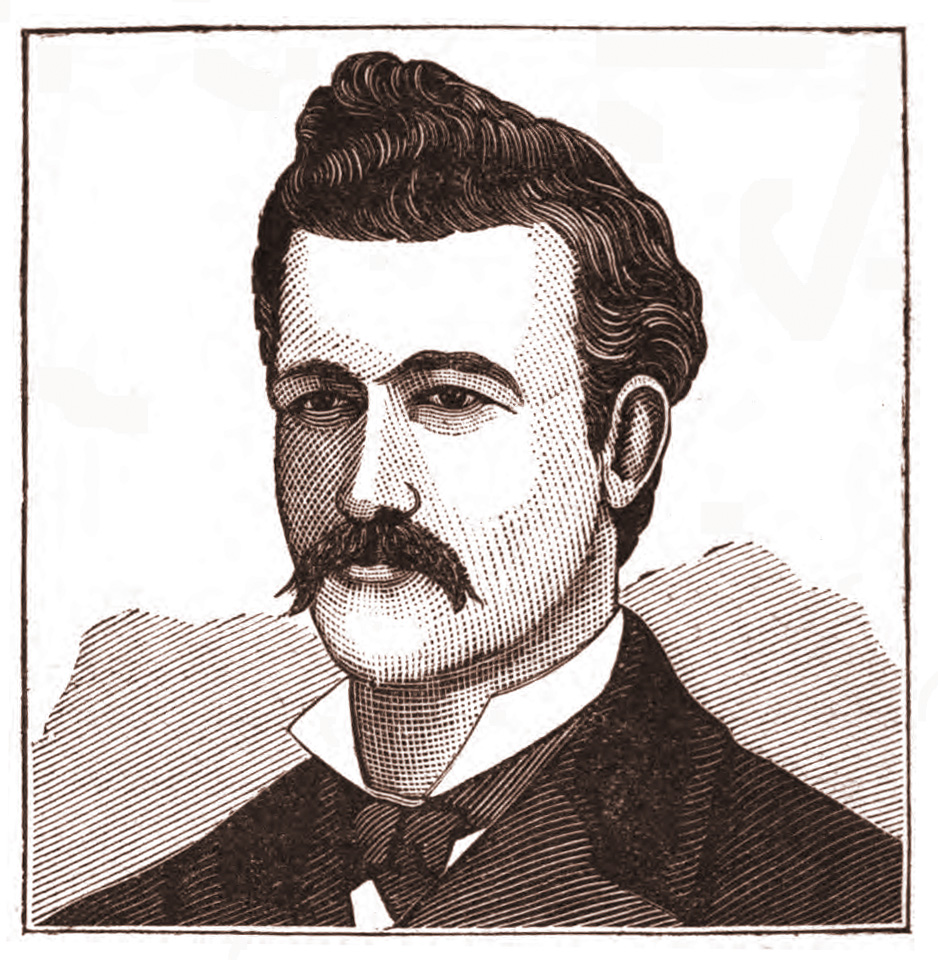
Kearney as he appeared on the cover of an 1878 pamphlet collecting his speeches.

In one of his early speeches he urged laborers to be "thrifty and industrious like the Chinese", but within a year's time he began denouncing Chinese immigrants as the cause of white workers' economic woes. By 1878 he used the Sandlot forum to give frequent and violent speeches against Chinese immigrants and the problems he claimed they caused. He warned railroad owners that they had three months to fire all of their Chinese workers or "remember Judge Lynch."

Within a short time he was known throughout California for his racially charged speeches in which he repeated his slogan "The Chinese must go."

In 1878, Kearney traveled to Boston to carry his message against the Chinese to eastern audiences. He was warmly welcomed, and it was estimated that "thousands, indeed, packed Faneuil Hall on August 5 to hear his first speech, and thousands more had to be turned away." Within a short time, however, the crowds at his speeches began to dwindle. The Boston Journal noted "the workingmen of this state are by no means united in welcoming Kearney ... Many of them have no sympathy with his anti-Chinese policy, they dislike his openly Communistic principles, and will not endure his conceited intolerance."

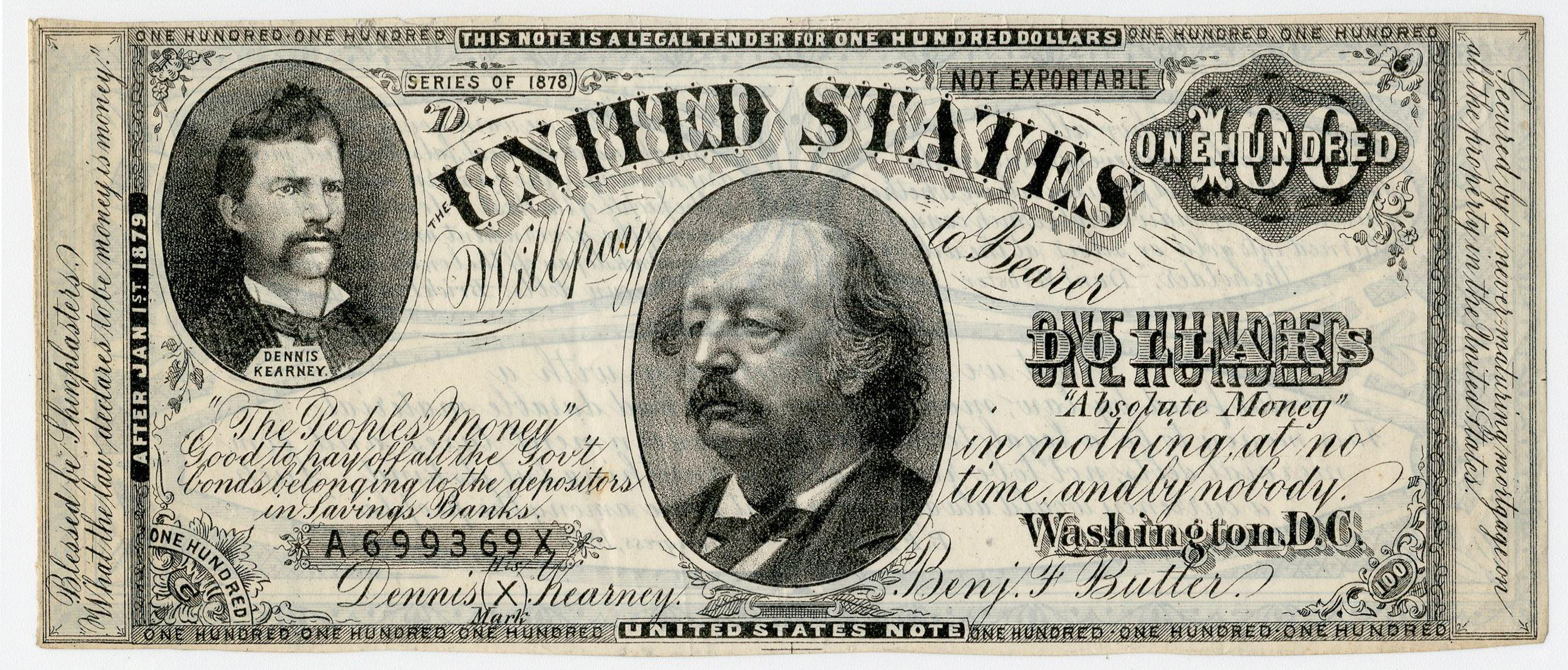
A fake hundred-dollar bill, featuring the likenesses of Kearney and Benjamin Butler, circulated during the 1884 United States presidential election

Kearney supported affiliating the Workingmen with the Greenback-Labor Party, and in 1880 was made a member of the party's national executive committee. However, later that year, rising political boss Christopher Augustine Buckley convinced him to throw the weight of the WPC behind Winfield Scott Hancock in the 1880 presidential election, ensuring his victory in the state. Kearney later traveled east to campaign with the Massachusetts politician Benjamin Butler, the Greenback Party's candidate for president in 1884. Kearney sought the vice presidential nomination, but Butler never offered it to him. After criticism of Kearney increased in editorials and articles in eastern newspapers, he returned to San Francisco.

Kearney sometimes crossed paths with Chinese-American civil rights activist Wong Chin Foo. Wong challenged Kearney to a duel on the occasion of a speech by Kearney in New York in 1883, giving Kearney "his choice of chopsticks, Irish potatoes, or Krupp guns." Kearney responded by calling Wong an "almond-eyed leper." Wong's darkly sarcastic commentary on Christian hypocrisy "Why am I a Heathen?" speculated that Kearney might slip into heaven (via an eleventh-hour repentance), and proceed to "organize a heavenly crusade to have me and others immediately cast out and into the other place."

== Later life ==
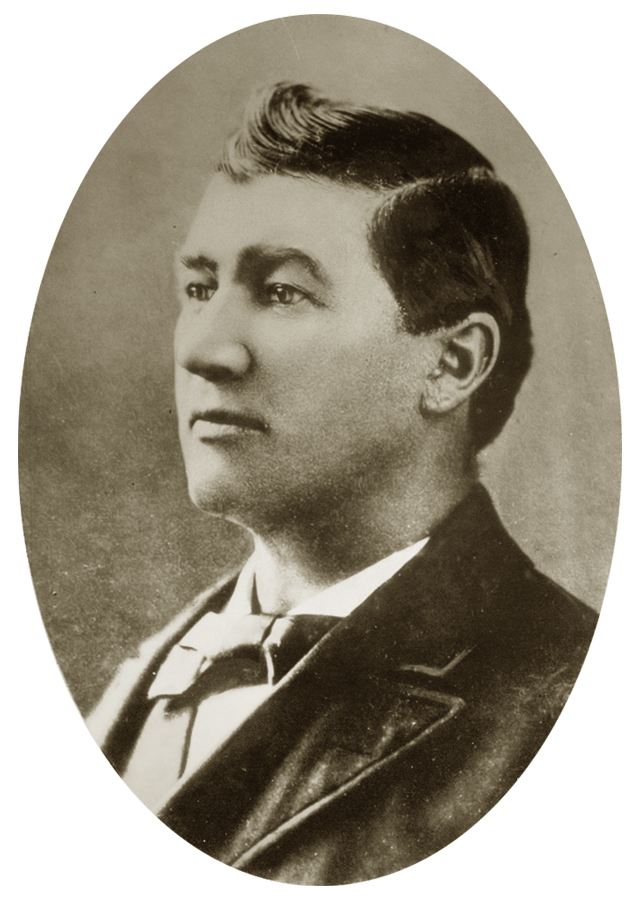
Kearney later in life

Kearney faded from the public's eye by the early 1880s, leaving as his legacy only the anti-Chinese laws that the Workingmen's Party had passed at the 1879 California Constitutional Convention. Many of these laws, which included a ban on the employment of Chinese laborers, were ruled unconstitutional by the federal Ninth Circuit Court. Corresponding with the Irish author and politician James Bryce in the late 1880s, Kearney nonetheless claimed credit for making the "Chinese Question" a national issue and affecting the legislation of the Chinese Exclusion Act in 1882.

=== Mooneysville ===
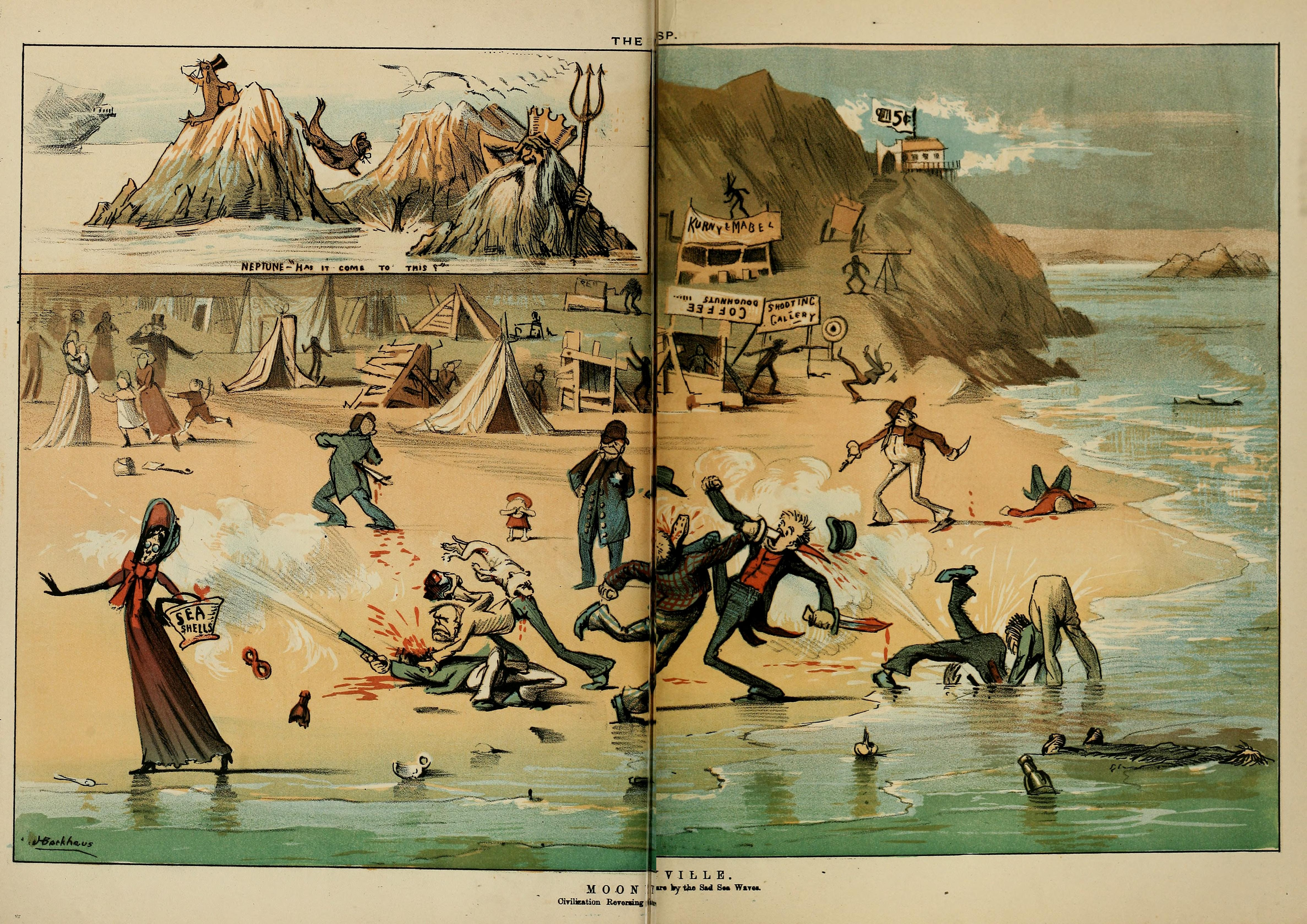
A satirical depiction of Mooneysville by Henry Barkhaus published in The Wasp, January 26, 1884

In December 1883, the Park and Ocean Railroad Company (owned by the Big Four's Central Pacific Railroad) obtained a fifty-year franchise to build a railroad across Golden Gate Park along Ocean Beach. Protesting the underhanded tactics used by the company to override then-mayor Washington Bartlett's veto of the franchise, Kearney and fellow "sand-lotters" Con Mooney and Stephen Maybell staked their own illegal claims along the beach. To attract squatters, Kearney and Mooney offered drinks and dancing while Maybell ran a coffee and doughnuts stand. Other entrepreneurs soon followed, and the settlement came to be known as "Mooneysville."

Within days, Mooneysville boasted dozens of stands and thousands of visitors, drawing the ire of parks commissioner Frank M. Pixley. By the time he issued an eviction notice in January 1884, the settlement resembled an actual town, with a hardware store, a candy factory, a bakery, a chop house, several wells and pumps, a lumberyard, and fifteen saloons. However, when he sent twenty-five laborers backed up by seven policemen to clear out Mooneysville, they faced little resistance. For his part, Kearney let the laborers disassemble his shack for him, giving them orders as they worked.

=== Speculation fortune ===
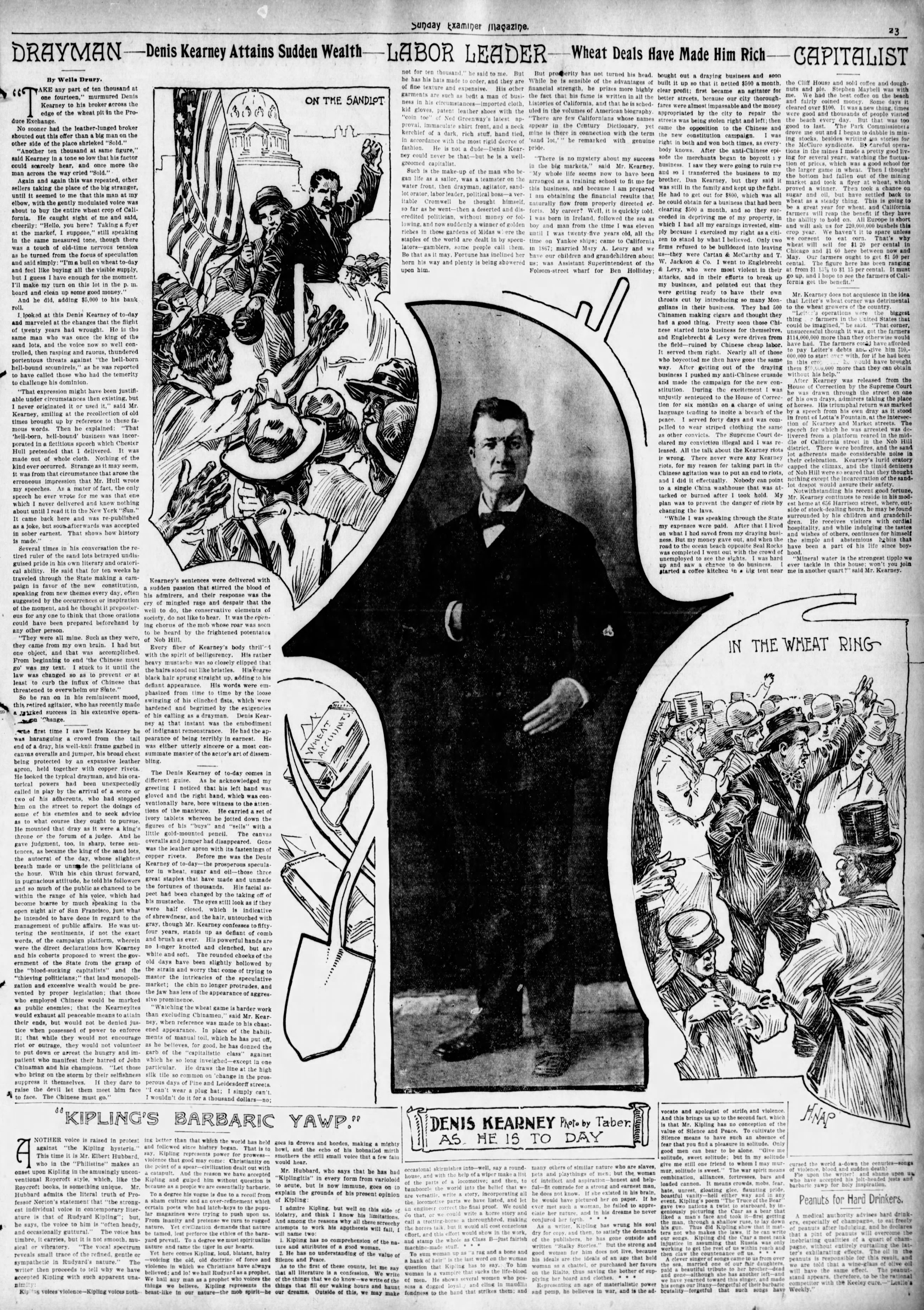
"Drayman, Labor Leader, Capitalist," a profile of Kearney by Wells Drury published in the San Francisco Examiner, September 3, 1899

On March 26, 1899, The San Francisco Call reported that Kearney, now working as a speculator, had made $100,000 (equivalent to over $3 million in 2025) by shorting a massive quantity of wheat right before competitors broke Joseph Leiter's corner of the market, causing prices to plummet. Kearney's good luck made national headlines, with newspapers and columnists contrasting his newfound wealth with his early career as an anti-capitalist. Ambrose Bierce wrote:

Denis Kearney with gloves! Denis Kearney topped with a shiny hat and booted to match! Denis Kearney lounging gracefully in the office of the Palace Hotel, uttering smooth nothings in unailing English! Denis Kearney cherishing in his breast pocket papers attesting his purchase of three thousand tons of wheat!

— Ambrose Bierce, The Passing Show, August 13, 1899

== Death ==
Kearney died at his home in Alameda, California on April 24, 1907. He had been suffering from kidney disease and failing eyesight for several months prior, and his home in San Francisco had been destroyed in the 1906 earthquake. His death made international headlines, and drew positive and negative eulogies; while the San Francisco Evening Bulletin remembered him as "the father of the labor movement on the Pacific Coast," The Baltimore Sun labeled him a "demagogue who was forgotten long before his death." On May 30, 1907, Congressman Champ Clark devoted the end of his syndicated column, Champ Clark's Letter, to Kearney. He wrote:

The public press has devoted much space in way of obituaries to Denis Kearney. They all pronounce him a cheap, coarse demagogue, but they admit that he more than anybody else forced the new constitution on California and compelled the Chinese exclusion act, which is far more than many big bore statesmen have done. On his tombstone should be chiseled his slogan, "The Chinese Must Go!" In helping to force Chinese exclusion Denis rendered the country a vast, patriotic service. His methods were crude, his oratory was crude, but when all the silver tongued orators and elegant time servers of his day are forgotten, the laborers of the Pacific coast and of the whole country will remember with gratitude that Denis Kearney was largely instrumental in saving them from the blight of Chinese competition.

— Champ Clark, Champ Clark's Letter, May 30, 1907

== Legacy ==
Today there is a Kearny Street in San Francisco that runs through Chinatown; however it was not named after Denis Kearney but after the Mexican–American War Army officer Stephen W. Kearny.

Dean S. Jagger plays the role of Dylan Leary on Warrior, who is based on Denis Kearney.

== Excerpts from Kearney's speeches ==
- "When the Chinese question is settled, we can discuss whether it would be better to hang, shoot, or cut the capitalists to pieces. In six months we will have 50,000 men ready to go out ... and if 'John' [the Chinese] don't leave here, we will drive him and his aborts [sic] into the sea ... We are ready to do it ... If the ballot fails, we are ready to use the bullet."
- "When I have thoroughly organized my party, we will march through the city and compel the thieves to give up their plunder. I will lead you to the City Hall, clean out the police force, hang the Prosecuting Attorney, burn every book that has a particle of law in it, and then enact new laws for the workingmen."
- "For reporters of the press I have great respect. The reporters of the newspapers are workingmen, like ourselves working for bread and butter. But for the villainous, serpent-like, slimy imps of hell that run the newspapers, I have the utmost contempt."
- "If the legislature oversteps decency, then hemp is the battle-cry." [referring to hemp ropes that could be used in lynchings]

== See also ==
- Carl Browne
- San Francisco Riot of 1877
- Workingmen's Party of California

== Works ==
- The Workingmen's Party of California: An Epitome of Its Rise and Progress. San Francisco: Bacon, 1878.
- Speeches of Denis Kearney, Labor Champion. New York: Jesse Haney & Co., 1878.
