= Olivia Cheng (Canadian actress) =

Canadian actress

- Born: August 20, 1979 (age 47); Edmonton, Alberta, Canada
- Occupations: Actress, journalist

Olivia Cheng (Chinese: 鄭啟蕙; pinyin: Zhèng Qǐhuì) is a Canadian actress, broadcast journalist, and former correspondent for Entertainment Tonight Canada. Some of her roles include concubine Mei Lin in Marco Polo, sinister Master Gao in Deadly Class, Ah Toy (a madam in San Francisco's Chinatown with a secret violent life) in the 1870s-set martial arts crime drama series Warrior, Dr. Sylvia Wen (Boulder Free Zone's main doctor) in the 2021 adaptation of Stephen King's The Stand and warrior Charlotte in the dystopian series See.

== Early life ==
Cheng was born in Edmonton, Alberta, to parents who immigrated from Guangdong. They were part of a co-founding group of Chinese parents that created the Edmonton Mandarin Bilingual program within the city's public school system. Her father worked in software and her mother was a health aide.

Cheng enrolled in her first acting class at the age of six and booked her first commercial at nineteen. The following year, she attended NAIT's Radio and Television Arts program. After finishing school, she became a videographer for Global TV Lethbridge, before moving back to Edmonton to work as a broadcast and print journalist. She went on to freelance as a correspondent for ET Canada.

== Career ==
In the mid-2000s, AMC was launching its original content division and came to Alberta with a Walter Hill-helmed mini-series executive produced by Robert Duvall. They were looking for five Chinese actresses and were willing to consider amateurs. Duvall saw Cheng's audition and asked to bring her back. She was then cast in Broken Trail (2006), which was nominated for 16 Primetime Emmy Awards and won four, including the Emmy for Outstanding Mini Series.

In 2007, Cheng portrayed Iris Chang in the documentary Iris Chang: The Rape of Nanking, based on Chang's best-selling 1997 book The Rape of Nanking.

Cheng has appeared in Supernatural and Eureka, as well as in the episode "The New World" of the television show The 4400. In 2013, she appeared as Linda Park in the TV series Arrow.

In 2014, Cheng landed a role in Netflix's series Marco Polo, a lavish television drama about Marco Polo's journey as he travels from his home in Venice to the court of Kublai Khan, where he finds himself in the middle of a war in 13th-century China. The show was one of the most expensive TV series ever produced. Cheng portrayed Mei Lin, a Song dynasty concubine and assassin, and the sister of Jia Sidao. In a December 2014 interview, Cheng joked that owing to her frequent nude scenes in Marco Polo, she would not be watching the series with her parents.

In October 2017, it was announced Cheng would be part of the main cast of the Justin Lin-produced Warrior, set against the backdrop of the Tong Wars of San Francisco. In the series Cheng portrays Ah Toy, a madam in San Francisco's Chinatown during the 1870s, which is a fictionalised version of the real Ah Toy. The series, based on an original idea by the late Bruce Lee, premiered on Cinemax on April 5, 2019.

== Filmography ==
Year	Film/TV Series	Role	Notes
2000	Shanghai Noon	Dim Sum Girl #1	Uncredited
2002	Mentors	Beautiful Girl	Episode: "Enter the Monolith"
2003	Hollywood Wives: The New Generation	Girlfriend #1	TV movie
2003	Word of Honor	Reporter	TV movie
2004	12 Days of Christmas Eve	Jenna Lee	TV movie
2005	The Christmas Blessing	Anaesthetist	TV movie
2006	Goose on the Loose	Terry MacNeil	TV movie
2006	The 4400	Wheat Field Reporter	Episode: "The New World"
2006	Broken Trail	Ye Fung aka #4	TV Miniseries
2007	Psych	Bad Nanny	Episode: "Rob-a-Bye Baby"
2007	Blood Ties	Wynter	Episode: "Bugged"
2007	Iris Chang: The Rape of Nanking	Iris Chang	Documentary
2008	The Art of War II: Betrayal	Geena	Direct-to-DVD
2009	High Noon	Det. Liz Alberta	TV movie
2009	Something Evil Comes	Tara	TV movie
2010	The Staff Room	Ms. Vu	
2010	Eureka	Dr. Lisa Wheeler	Episode: "Crossing Over"
2010	Shattered	Grace Rossi	Episode: "Everyone's a Hostage to Someone"
2010	Messages Deleted	Myrna	
2010	On Strike for Christmas	Television Reporter	TV movie
2011	Fringe	Victoria DiMiri	Episode: "The Firefly"
2011	Hunt for the I-5 Killer	Young Woman	TV movie
2011	Flashpoint	Ruby Mai	Episode: "A Call to Arms"
2011	The House	Katie	
2011–2012	Supernatural	Susan / Leviathan	3 episodes
2012	Arctic Air	Eva Lam	Episode: "Vancouver Is Such a Screwed Up City"
2012	Fairly Legal	Sullivan	Episode: "Ripple of Hope"
2012	Broken Trust	Grace	TV movie
2012	A Killer Among Us	Miss Hetherington	
2012	Libelle	Jasmin Lu	
2012	It's Christmas, Carol!	Kendra	
2013	Assault on Wall Street	TV Host	
2013	Signed, Sealed, Delivered	Newsperson	
2013	Embrace of the Vampire	Kelly	
2013	Guess Who's Coming to Christmas	Chealsea	TV movie
2013	Blink	Hannah Duncan	TV movie
2013, 2017	Arrow	Linda Park	2 episodes
2014	The Flash	Linda Park	Episode: "Pilot" (archive footage)
2014	Skye and Chang	Emily Chang	TV movie
2014	Stolen from the Womb	Nicole	TV film
2014	Shamed	Michelle Kim	
2014	Deeper	Susan	
2014–2016	Marco Polo	Mei Lin	19 episodes
2015	Marco Polo: One Hundred Eyes	Mei Lin	TV Short
2016	Mission NinetyTwo: Dragonfly	Jasmine Chang	
2019	Deadly Class	Master Gao	Recurring role
2019–2023	Warrior	Ah Toy	Series Regular
2020	The Stand	Dr. Sylvia Wen	TV Miniseries
2021–2022	See	Charlotte	Series Regular
2024	Lucky Star	Noel	
2025	The Chinatown Diner	Connie	
2026	Ready or Not 2: Here I Come	Wan Chen Xing	
2026–present	Private Eyes West Coast	Detective Violet Xiao	Recurring (9 Episodes)
