= Ah Toy =

Chinese American sex worker and madam (1829-1928)

- Born: May 1828; Canton, Guangdong, Qing China
- Died: 1 February 1928 (aged 99); San Jose, California, US
- Other names: Atoy, Attoy, Achoi, Achoy
- Occupations: Sex worker, madam

Ah Toy (Chinese: 亞彩; Sidney Lau: Aa^{3} Coi^{2}; c.1828 – 1 February 1928) was a Chinese-American sex worker and madam in San Francisco, California during the California Gold Rush, and the first Chinese sex worker in San Francisco. Arriving from Hong Kong in 1848, she became the best-known Asian woman in the American frontier.

== Biography ==
Ah Toy emigrated to the United States from China around 1848 or 1849, arriving by 1850 at the latest, when Ah Chung, a resident of Hong Kong, claimed that Ah Toy was his wife and asked for her to be repatriated, which Ah Toy denied in front of a San Francisco court. Through an interpreter, she stated that she was born in Canton, had never married, and that her father was deceased, saying she had come to California "to better her condition". Other accounts claimed that when Ah Toy left China for the United States, she traveled with her husband, who died during the trip. She later became the mistress of the ship's captain, who gave her so much gold that by the time she arrived in San Francisco, Ah Toy had a good amount of money.

Ah Toy is described as the second Chinese woman to live in San Francisco, the first having been an unidentified servant from Hong Kong who entered with her American employers, Mr. and Mrs. Charles V. Gillespie, on 2 February 1848.

In 1850, Ah Toy won a legal case against neighbors who had filed charges against her, accusing Ah Toy of being a "public nuisance". According to a 22 May 1850 issue of the Alta California newspaper, "well-known China woman Achoi" married Henry Conrad in Sonoma on 16 May, though no further records of their marriage exist.

Before 1851, only seven Chinese women were known to be in the city, and noticing the looks she drew from the men in her new town, she deduced they would pay for a more intimate setting. Her peep shows grew successful, charging an ounce of gold (sixteen dollars) for a "lookee", and she became one of the highest paid and best-known Chinese sex workers in San Francisco. Due to her romantic relationship with brothel inspector James A. Clarke, Ah Toy's brothel escaped shutdown by city authorities during a Committee of Vigilance investigation.

Ah Toy was described as a determined and intelligent woman; frequently using the San Francisco Recorder's Court to protect herself and her business from exploitation. She opened a chain of brothels in 1852 and 1853, hiring girls from China. Ah Toy also faced pressure from male Chinese leaders, specifically Yuen Sheng, also known as Norman As-sing, who did not like the idea of a woman leading the brothel industry in the city.

By 1854, however, Ah Toy could no longer take her grievances to court. In the case People v. Hall, the California Supreme Court reversed the conviction of George Hall, who had murdered a Chinese man, extending a California law that African Americans and Native Americans could not testify in court to include the Chinese. While this law was not directed at sex workers, it handicapped Ah Toy's ability to protect herself from the domineering Chinese tongs that had long sought to control her and her business. Coupled with the anti-prostitution law of 1854, which was carried out mainly against the Chinese, the strain of her business became too great and Ah Toy withdrew from San Francisco's sex work business in 1857, announcing her departure to journalists.

In 1857, she returned to China as a wealthy woman, intending to live the rest of her days in comfort, but she returned to California by 1859. From 1868 until her death in 1928, she lived a mostly quiet life in Santa Clara County, often living with numerous partners over the decades, many of whom she legally could not marry because of anti-miscegenation laws in California that prevented people of East Asian descent from marrying white people. Ah Toy returned to mainstream public attention with her death in San Jose on 1 February 1928 at age 99, about three months before her hundredth birthday.

== In popular culture ==
Olivia Cheng portrays a mostly fictionalized Ah Toy in the Cinemax series Warrior, set during the Tong Wars in late 19th century San Francisco. The series begins in the late 1870s.
