= Christopher Augustine Buckley =

Irish-American saloonkeeper and Democratic Party political boss in San Francisco

Christopher A. Buckley
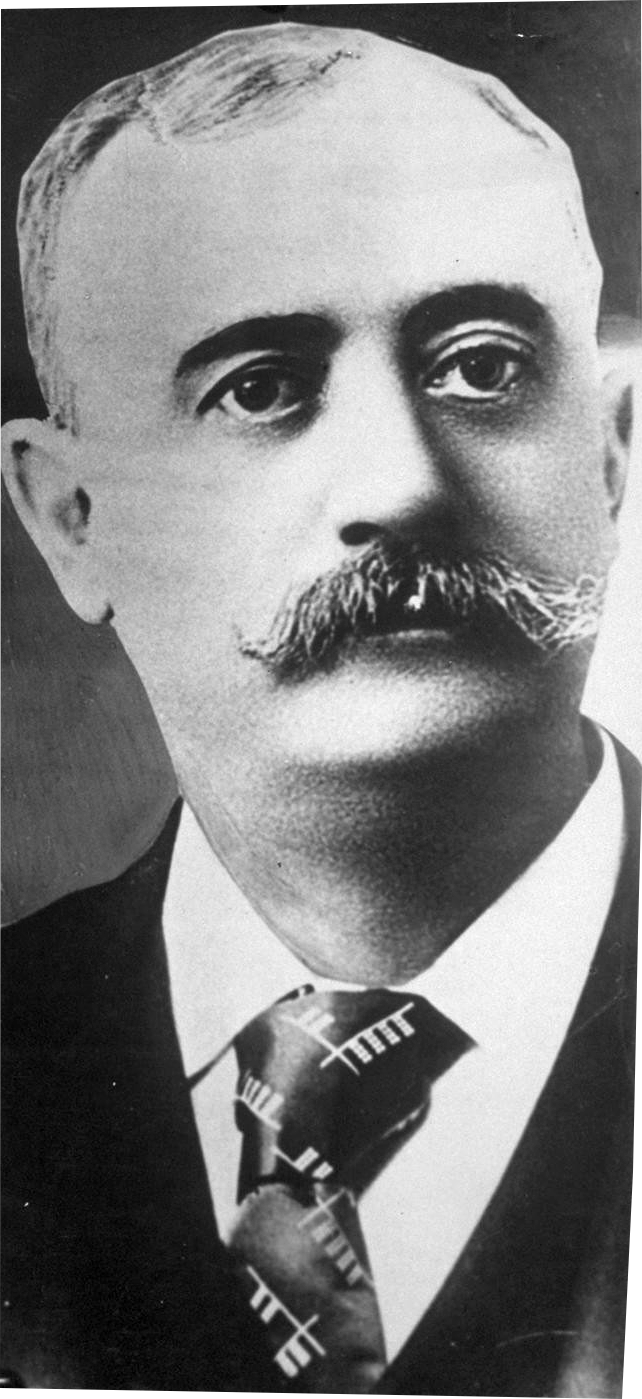
- Buckley c. 1880s
- Born: December 25, 1845; Ireland
- Died: April 20, 1922 (aged 76); San Francisco, California, U.S.
- Other name: "Blind Boss Buckley"
- Occupations: Saloonkeeper, lawyer, racketeer
- Known for: Political boss of San Francisco
- Political party: Democratic
- Opponents: Leland Stanford; Charles Crocker; Collis Potter Huntington; William Randolph Hearst
- Accomplices: Denis Kearney; George Hearst; Stephen M. White

Christopher Augustine Buckley Sr. (December 25, 1845 – April 20, 1922), commonly referred to as Blind Boss Buckley, was a saloonkeeper and Democratic Party political boss in San Francisco, California. Though he never held public office, Buckley ruled the San Francisco Democratic Party apparatus in the late 19th century.

== Biography ==
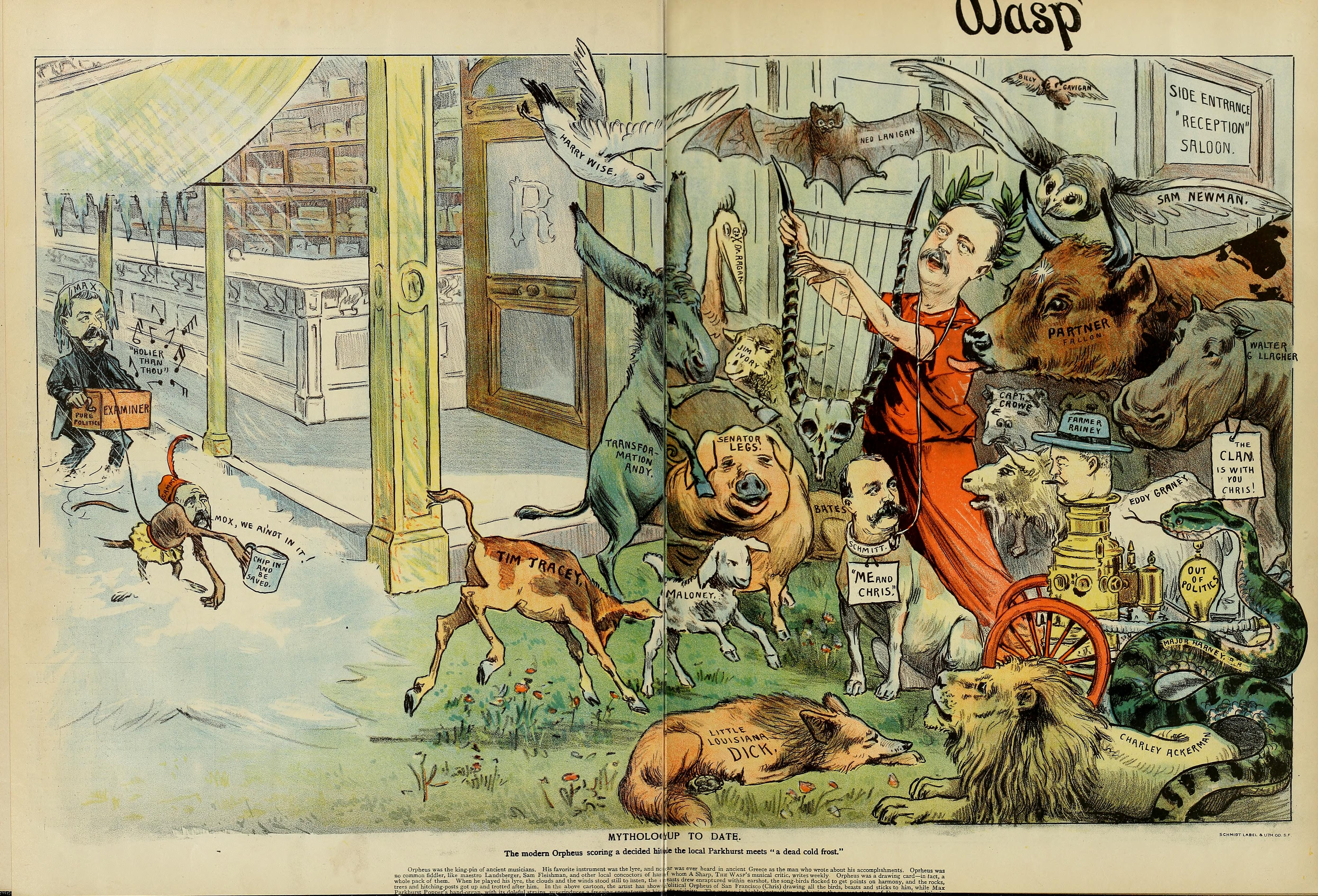
"Mythology Up To Date," a political cartoon published in The Wasp depicting Buckley as Orpheus, September 22, 1894

Buckley arrived with his family in San Francisco in 1862. His father was an Irish immigrant stonemason who had traveled to California before he brought his family west. As a young man, Buckley worked as a conductor on the Omnibus Railway Company's North Beach and South Park line. He quickly started bar-tending through association with impresario Thomas McGuire, builder of the Jenny Lind theaters, at McGuire's Snug Saloon.

Buckley was a major force for the Democratic Party in San Francisco, influencing state affairs and counseling the president on federal patronage distribution. He was vilified as "what men call a crook." He was routinely accused in the newspaper for corruption, bribery, and even felonious crime. After his death, however, the same newspapers lavished praise on him: The Chronicle described his charity acts, saying he had "a kindly, just and generous dispensation..The passing of the great leader will be a tragedy to many who were aided by him in time of need."

After joining the Democratic Party, Buckley became blind. His blindness caused him to compensate by memorizing city ordinances, contracts, and other documents after having them read to him. He was able to recognize people just by their handclasp when shaking hands, prompting the local Chinese population to refer to him as maang paak gwai, meaning the "blind pale spirit."

Ravenswood, the Livermore, California, estate Buckley built in 1885 as a summer home, is listed on the National Register of Historic Places.

== Sources ==
- Livermore History - Ravenswood
