= Coffee and doughnuts =

Common food and drink pairing

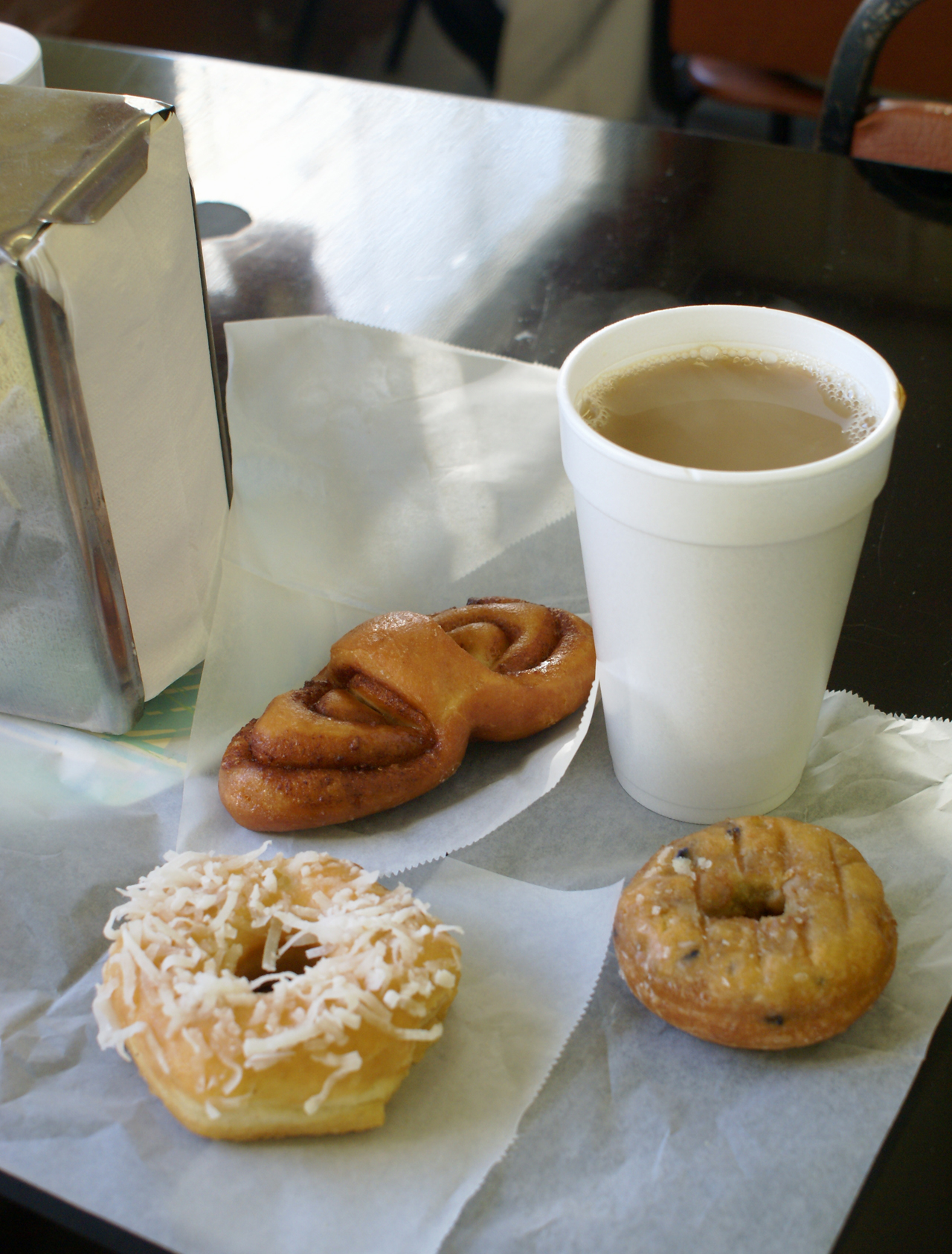
Coffee and doughnuts at a coffee shop

Coffee and doughnuts is a common food and drink pairing in the United States and Canada (where doughnuts are sometimes spelled donuts). The pairing is often consumed as a simple breakfast, and is often consumed in doughnut shops as well as coffeeshops. The pairing may also be served and consumed as a refreshment.

Coffee breaks are sometimes taken as a work break during the mid-morning or mid-afternoon "to consume coffee and doughnuts (or rolls)." In 1989, Harry Balzer, the chief industry analyst of the market research company NPD Group, stated that in the United States, 41–42% of all breakfasts included coffee and that 14.2% of all breakfasts included a doughnut.

Coffee and doughnuts are sometimes provided as a part of events and fundraisers for various organizations, charities, groups and companies.

== History ==
The pairing of doughnuts and coffee became popular in the 1930s after Clark Gable did it in It Happened One Night. An urban legend states actress Mae Murray accidentally dunked her doughnuts in coffee. It became a mainstay around World War II as doughnut shops were one of the few businesses open after midnight. Some doughnut shops would give coffee and doughnuts to police officers in exchange for free policing. Prior to this, the National Dunking Association had established campaigns for dunking doughnuts.

== Companies ==
Some companies use the phrase "coffee and doughnuts" in their business name, such as Bob's Coffee and Doughnuts in Los Angeles, California. Krispy Kreme has provided free coffee and doughnuts in commemoration of National Coffee Day, and other companies have offered discounts or special offers in commemoration of the day. Tim Hortons is a Canadian multinational fast casual restaurant chain known for its coffee and doughnuts.

In September 2015, Dunkin' Donuts, a doughnut and coffee shop chain, announced plans to move forward with a delivery program that includes delivery of coffee, doughnuts and other foods, to begin sometime in 2016. The delivery program is devised to use a mobile application for ordering products, and will be launched when the company updates its mobile application. The program was under consideration in June 2015. The New York Post reported that this was done in efforts to increase competition with Starbucks Coffee.

== Properties ==
Coffee and doughnuts provide caffeine, and large amounts of fat and sugar.

== Venues ==
In March 2013, it was reported that U.S. taxpayer money was funding the consumption of coffee, doughnuts, and other foods by U.S. lawmakers. Coffee and doughnuts are commonly served at twelve-step meetings, such as Alcoholics Anonymous.

== In language ==
The English slang language terms "coffee-and" and "coffee-an" have been used in the 20th century as a noun to denote a cup of coffee and cakes or doughnuts, such as that being the most affordable meal available in a diner or café, and commonly considered to be 'the office diet'. As an adjective, the term "coffee-and" was used in the 1930s relating to money, as in "just enough to buy coffee and doughnuts", and in the 20th century as a term referring to things that are "cheap, minimal" or "second rate".

The 20th century English language slang term "coffee-and-doughnut gun" can refer to a "small, relatively powerless gun", and was also used in the 1920s as a slang term for "a second-rate, unthreatening gangster".

Police are often described as favoring coffee and doughnuts for their rather inexpensive meals, especially in mornings. This is common enough for a trope dealing with "cops in doughnut shops" to have arisen.

Others have speculated that the association police have with coffee and doughnuts arose as officers on night shifts used doughnut shops (one of the few businesses open all night in the 1940s) to write up notes, use the bathroom, and have a snack.
