= A Patient Man (film) =

Film

- Directed by: Kevin Ward
- Written by: Kevin Ward
- Produced by: Jonathan Mangum; Jason Moyer; Harrison Reynolds; Kathrine Von Till
- Starring: Jonathan Mangum; Tate Ellington; Kelsey Scott; David Jahn; Amir Talai
- Release dates: February 19, 2019 (Hollywood Reel Independent Film Festival); January 17, 2020
- Running time: 93 minutes
- Country: United States
- Language: English

A Patient Man is a crime drama film, written and directed by Kevin Ward and released on January 17, 2020.

== Plot ==
Tom Alexander works for a consulting firm in Los Angeles. He was injured and his wife killed in a car accident caused by another driver running a red light; he now wears a knee brace, commutes on his bicycle and via light rail instead of in a car, and is seeing a therapist. He is troubled by flashbacks; on the train, he meets Aaron, who tells him his driving license has been restricted, and Tom patiently finds out more and then plots his revenge.

== Cast ==
- Jonathan Mangum as Tom Alexander
- Tate Ellington as Aaron Clarke
- Kelsey Scott as Tom's therapist
- Amir Talai as Rami, Tom's co-worker
- Catherine Von Till as Rachel

== Production ==
A Patient Man was Ward's first feature film; he also wrote the script, and described it as Hitchcockian in inspiration.

== Release ==
The film was shown at the 2019 Austin Film Festival and released on video on demand on February 7, 2020.

== Reception ==
Some reviewers described A Patient Man as "interesting and twisted" and praised Ward's direction for "an amazing job of hiding the clues to the mystery while showing a very real depiction of how a person can descend into revenge because of their grief," as well as praising Mangum's and Ellington's performances. Others criticized the film for "telegraph[ing] the plot even while spinning it" and Mangum's performance as "so deadpan as to be sleep inducing."
