= David Jahn =

David Jahn may refer to:

- David Jahn (filmmaker) (born 1975), Swiss-Czech filmmaker and musician
- David Jahn (racing driver) (born 1990), German racing driver
