= Under the Boardwalk (2023 film) =

Film directed by David Soren

- Theatrical release poster
- Directed by: David Soren
- Screenplay by: Lorene Scafaria; David Soren
- Story by: Lorene Scafaria; David Dobkin
- Produced by: David Dobkin; Dagan Potter; Allison Gardner
- Starring: Keke Palmer; Michael Cera; Bobby Cannavale; Russell Brand; John Magaro; Jon Rudnitsky; Steven Van Zandt
- Cinematography: Scott McGinley (layout)
- Edited by: David Ian Salter
- Music by: John Debney (score); Jonathan Sadoff; (score and songs): Sean Douglas (songs)
- Production companies: Paramount Animation; Big Kid Pictures
- Distributed by: Paramount Pictures
- Release date: October 27, 2023
- Running time: 86 minutes
- Country: United States
- Language: English

Under the Boardwalk is a 2023 American animated musical romantic comedy film directed by David Soren, who co-wrote the screenplay with Lorene Scafaria. The film features the voices of Keke Palmer, Michael Cera, Bobby Cannavale, Russell Brand, John Magaro, Jon Rudnitsky, and Steven Van Zandt. The story follows two hermit crabs from conflicting families who, after a storm casts them far from home, journey back to their community.

The film had a limited theatrical release on October 27, 2023, followed by a video-on-demand release on November 7. The film received positive reviews from critics.

== Plot ==
A community of land hermit crabs living beneath a New Jersey beach boardwalk often plays host to a group of sea hermit crabs who come onto land for vacation, even though the two species cannot stand each other. Armen, a timid land crab, is reluctant to go out and socialize afraid of the water due to the way his parents died in a storm when he was a child. His rotting shell, inhabited by a fun-loving organism named Anemone, is the only reminder of them.

Three muscular crabs, Armen’s friends Bobby, Manny, and Jimmy, take him to a club owned by his uncle Bruno. There, the crabs get into a fight with an arrogant sea crab named Mako when Armen inadvertently bumps into Ramona, a tourist sea crab he had developed a crush on earlier. The land crabs are evicted as a result, and a frustrated Armen leaves on his own.

While sulking by the seashore, Armen is confronted by Mako and his goons, who hassle him and steal his shell. Ramona intervenes, but she and Armen are swept away by a high tide that devastates the land crab civilization.

Armen ends up at the far end of the beach above the boardwalk, where he is captured by a human collector and given an artificial shell to be sold as a pet. While in captivity he reunites with Ramona, and together they escape and look for a way to work their way back home. During their journey while enjoying the attractions at the pier, they share their insecurities: Armen’s fear of doing anything beyond staying in his shell, and Ramona’s desire to escape her overbearing mother, Val, who expects perfection from her.

Armen and Ramona’s disappearances intensify the rivalry between the land and sea crabs, largely because Mako fabricates a story claiming Armen tried to steal Ramona from him. Bobby begins second-guessing his tendency to use physical force against his enemies and while searching for Armen he encounters and befriends Ramona’s deaf sister, Shelly, who is in turn searching for Ramona. When Bobby walks her home, Val misunderstanding his presence angrily sends him away. Later, when he tries to break up a violent fight between his friends and Mako’s gang he accidentally snaps off Mako’s right arm.

Mako vows revenge and falsely claims that Armen is dead, presenting Armen’s shell and a shell-shocked Anemone as proof. The land and sea crabs declare war.

As Armen and Ramona fall in love, two crabs they met at the pier begin judging their relationship, making Armen hesitant about his feelings, much to Ramona’s distress. Eventually, Ramona begins to dehydrate and collapses. Armen carries her toward the water, pushing past the fighting land and sea crabs, who stop battling when they see Armen risking everything to save her.

Armen conquers his fear of water and submerges Ramona into the sea. She awakens, kisses Armen and together they return to the surface now a couple, much to the delight of his friends. Armen is praised for his heroism, Mako is exposed as a liar, and the land and sea crabs work past their differences.

Mako gives Bobby a new shell as a peace offering, and Armen gives his own shell to an older crab named Curly who needs it more, finally letting go of his past. The film ends with the two crabs playing in the surf amidst their happy joint communities while fireworks light up the Jersey sky, wishing summer would never end.

== Voice cast ==
- Keke Palmer as Ramona, a sea hermit crab
- Michael Cera as Armen, an aquaphobic land hermit crab
- Bobby Cannavale as Bobby Marinara, a land hermit crab, Mako's rival, and one of Armen's friends
- Russell Brand as Mako, a sea hermit crab, Bobby's rival and Ramona's previous love interest
- John Magaro as Manny, one of Bobby's friends
- Jon Rudnitsky as Jimmy, one of Bobby's friends
- Steven Van Zandt as Bruno, Armen's wise old uncle
- Vanessa Bell Calloway as Val, Ramona and Shelly's mother
- Shoshannah Stern as Shelly, Ramona's deaf sister who communicates through sign-language
- Ron Funches as Anemone, Armen's best friend that lives within his shell
- Mario Cantone as Mr. Cacciatore, Armen and Bobby's boss
- Gideon Adlon as Denise
- Liza Tarbuck as Camille
- Lesli Margherita as Etta / Bedazzled lady
- Cassandra Scerbo as Loretta / Sea crab mom / Female land crab
- Phil LaMarr as Big Sal / Little Junior / Donny the bouncer / Bucket man / How You Doin' crab / Beach land crab
- Steven Schirripa as Mr. Marinara
- Sharon Angela as Mrs. Marinara
- MrBeast as Hot Sauce Crab
- Joseph Balderrama as Chauncey
- Sean Chiplock as Nigel
- David Soren as Yoga crab / Battle dad
- Valarie Rae Miller as Townie crab / Neon crab / Female sea crab
- Jim Cummings as Curly / Local land crab
- Maureen Van Zandt as shop mother
- David Ian Salter as Unicorn crab

== Production ==
In June 2019, the film was announced under the name of Jersey Crabs, as part of Paramount Animation's upcoming slate, with Lorene Scafaria, who also served as executive producer, writing the screenplay and David Dobkin producing. In July 2020, it was reported that David Soren was hired to direct the film, which was retitled Under the Boardwalk. New Republic Pictures co-financed the film, but was not credited. The animation was done by DNEG Animation in Montreal, with production underway by February 2021. Production was done remotely during the COVID-19 pandemic. By June 3, 2022, the film was in post-production, with production being completed by August 7, 2022. Braam Jordaan was an animation consultant for the film.

== Music ==
In June 2021, it was reported that Sean Douglas would write original music for the film. On May 23, 2022, scoring was announced to be underway. Ariel Rechtshaid served as the music producer. In October 2023, it was announced that John Debney and Jonathan Sadoff had composed the film's score, with Sadoff co-writing the songs. Sony Masterworks released a soundtrack EP for the film on November 3, 2023.

=== Track listing ===
All songs are written by Douglas and Sadoff.

Under the Boardwalk (Songs from the Motion Picture)
No.	Title	Performer(s)	Length
1.	"Welcome to New Jersey"	Bobby Cannavale; John Magaro; Jon Rudnitsky; Gideon Adlon; Lesli Margherita; Cassandra Scerbo; Sharon Angela; Valarie Rae Miller; Phil LaMarr; Ron Funches	3:20
2.	"Anyone Else"	Keke Palmer; Michael Cera	2:00
3.	"Line in the Sand"	Russell Brand; Cannavale; Magaro; Rudnitsky; Steven Van Zandt; Vanessa Bell Calloway; Mario Cantone; Angela; Liza Tarbuck	2:33
4.	"Look Around"	Palmer; Cera	2:17
5.	"More Than a Meathead"	Cannavale	2:07
6.	"Going Out"	Cannavale; Magaro; Rudnitsky; Palmer; Cera; Angela; Steve Schirripa; Adlon; Margherita; Scerbo; David Soren; Cantone; Funches; Van Zandt; Bell Calloway; LaMarr; Rae Miller	2:28
Total length:			14:51

== Release ==
Under the Boardwalk was released in select theaters on October 27, 2023, followed by a wide video-on-demand release on November 7. It was previously scheduled for release on July 22, 2022, but in January 2022, it was removed from the release schedule with Paws of Fury: The Legend of Hank taking the date. On July 26, 2023, it was announced that it would be released on Paramount+. In October 2023, it was given for a limited theatrical release on its current date under the Nickelodeon Movies imprint, followed by its video-on-demand release.

On December 19, 2023, it was released by DVD by Paramount Home Entertainment.

== Reception ==
Calum Baker of the Radio Times wrote, "There's nothing surprising about this bright, loud musical adventure, with its themes of social acceptance and being true to oneself. But the tunes aren't too bad, there are some fine gags and the animators have inventive fun with their crustacean designs". Common Sense Media's Sandie Angulo Chen gave it a score of three out of five.
