= Turbo (2013 film) =

2013 animated film directed by David Soren

- Theatrical release poster
- Directed by: David Soren
- Screenplay by: David Soren; Darren Lemke; Robert Siegel
- Story by: David Soren
- Produced by: Lisa Stewart
- Starring: Ryan Reynolds; Paul Giamatti; Michael Peña; Luis Guzmán; Bill Hader; Maya Rudolph; Snoop Dogg; Ben Schwartz; Ken Jeong; Richard Jenkins; Michelle Rodriguez; Michael Patrick Bell; Samuel L. Jackson
- Cinematography: Chris Stover
- Edited by: James Ryan
- Music by: Henry Jackman
- Production company: DreamWorks Animation
- Distributed by: 20th Century Fox (Note: In 2018, the film's distribution rights were transferred from 20th Century Fox to Universal Pictures, following NBCUniversal's acquisition of DreamWorks Animation in 2016.)
- Release dates: May 20, 2013 (CineEurope); July 17, 2013 (United States)
- Running time: 96 minutes
- Country: United States
- Language: English
- Budget: $131 million
- Box office: $282.6 million

Turbo is a 2013 American animated sports comedy film directed by David Soren and written by Soren, Darren Lemke and Robert Siegel. It stars Ryan Reynolds, Paul Giamatti, Michael Peña, Luis Guzmán, Bill Hader, Maya Rudolph, Snoop Dogg, Ken Jeong, Richard Jenkins, Michelle Rodriguez, Michael Patrick Bell, and Samuel L. Jackson. In the film, a garden snail (Reynolds) pursues his dream of winning the Indianapolis 500 after a freak accident gives him super speed.

In 2009, DreamWorks Animation organized a competition for its staff to submit a one-page pitch for film ideas. Soren's concept was "The Fast and the Furious with snails" and he won the competition. With no further development for several years, Soren pushed the project again after he and his family moved into a new home with a backyard infested with snails. For the racing elements of the film, Soren was inspired by his son's fascination with race cars.

Turbo premiered at CineEurope on May 20, 2013, and was theatrically released in the United States on July 17, 2013 by 20th Century Fox. The film received mixed reviews from critics. Despite grossing $282 million on a $131 million budget, the film was a box office failure, and lost the studio $13.5 million. A television series based on the film Turbo Fast was released in 2013.

== Plot ==
In a suburban tomato garden of Van Nuys in California, Theo, self-named "Turbo", is a garden snail who dreams of being a racer like his hero, a five-time Indianapolis 500 French-Canadian champion Guy Gagné. However, his obsession with racing makes him an outcast in the slow and cautious snail community and a constant embarrassment to his older brother, Chet. One night, Theo wanders onto a freeway to admire the traffic and wishes to be fast. Suddenly, he gets sucked through the supercharger of a Chevrolet Camaro during a drag race, fusing his body with nitrous oxide.

Upon waking up the next day, he discovers that he now possesses super speed powers as well as other characteristics of a car. His first attempt at using his newfound speed power ends with him accidentally crashing a boy's tricycle into the tomato garden, resulting in him and Chet getting fired. Chet is then snatched by a crow, but Theo rescues him near a rundown strip mall called "Starlight Plaza". Both are then captured by Tito Lopez, a taco truck driver who works at the Plaza, and they are brought to a snail race held by him and his coworkers. Theo wins the race in a matter of seconds, earning the respect of the snails including their leader Whiplash, and firmly establishing the name "Turbo" as his own.

Tito plans to revive Starlight Plaza with Turbo as a main attraction, but Turbo convinces Tito to enter him in the upcoming Indianapolis 500 as a competitor. After the snails divert and strand a tour bus to see Turbo's superspeed power, bringing impressive business, Tito's coworkers agree to put up the entrance fee and accompany them to Indianapolis. At the Indianapolis Motor Speedway, Turbo shows off his super speed powers after a chance meeting with Gagné, qualifying for the race and becoming a social media sensation in the process. The CEO of IndyCar reluctantly lets Turbo compete when Gagné supports him. The night before the race, Turbo has an argument with Chet, who opposes his participation in the race as he fears that he might get hurt or killed by the cars. Sneaking out, Turbo encounters Gagné, who reveals that he solely cares about winning and that he only supported Turbo's participation in the race to get more publicity. He then demoralizes and warns Turbo to back out of the race.

When the race begins, the more experienced competitors leave Turbo in last place. During a pit stop, Whiplash and his crew give Turbo a pep talk, advising him to stop racing like a car. Using his small size to his advantage, Turbo begins to rapidly gain ground. Gagné resorts to cheating and knocks him against the wall, damaging his shell and severely weakening his super speed. However, Turbo refuses to give up, and he eventually takes the lead from Gagné on the final lap. Gagné drives over debris to overtake him on the last turn, only to trigger a crash that involves most of the competitors, including Turbo, whose shell is broken and his super speed powers almost completely gone, causing him to initially give up.

Having a change of heart, Chet meets with Whiplash's crew and encourages Turbo to continue. Motivated by his older brother's support, Turbo resumes the race. Gagné pursues him by dragging his wrecked car and attempts to kill Turbo by stepping on him, but Turbo narrowly wins the race by tucking and rolling with his broken shell. In the aftermath, Starlight Plaza thrives from Theo's fame; the businesses become spectacular successes and hold elaborate snail races. Turbo discovers that his shell has healed, and his super speed powers have returned.

== Voice cast ==
- Ryan Reynolds as Theo/Turbo, the main protagonist, a garden snail who dreams of becoming a non-human racer in the next Indianapolis 500 champion and obtains superspeed powers during a street race.
- Paul Giamatti as Chet, Turbo's overprotective older brother and later becomes Burn's boyfriend.
- Michael Peña as Tito Lopez, a taco seller who finds and befriends Theo.
- Bill Hader as Guy Gagné, an arrogant, 5-time French-Canadian Indianapolis 500 champion who is Theo's racing hero and later becomes Theo's racing arch-nemesis.
- Samuel L. Jackson as Whiplash, the leader of the Starlight Plaza Snail crew with a shell resembling a stereotypically modified muscle car.
- Snoop Dogg as Smoove Move, the flexible member of Whiplash's crew who is themed after a lowrider.
- Maya Rudolph as Burn, a maternal sassy red snail who becomes Chet's love interest. She is themed after tuner scene vehicles.
- Ben Schwartz as SkidMark, Whiplash's "feisty #2" whose shell is modelled after a dragster.
- Michael Patrick Bell as White Shadow, a large white snail with a Monster truck shell.
- Luis Guzmán as Angelo Lopez, Tito's older brother and employer.
- Richard Jenkins as Bobby, a shopkeeper at a hobby store in Starlight Plaza who makes and sells custom models and snail shells.
- Ken Jeong as Kim-Ly, a short, middle-aged Asian manicurist at Starlight Plaza.
- Michelle Rodriguez as Paz, a car mechanic at Starlight Plaza.
- Kurtwood Smith as the Indianapolis Motor Speedway CEO
- Dario Franchitti as Scottish Anchor and Male Tourist
- James Ryan as Takao Noguchi, a Japanese Indianapolis 500 racer.
- Will Power as himself. Power's Verizon car also appears in the film
- Mario Andretti as Indianapolis Motor Speedway Traffic Director
- Paul Page and Chris Parnell as Announcers
- Paul Dooley as Carl, Chet and Theo's boss.
- Jonathan Silver Scott as The Little Dog
- Drew Scott as The Little Cat
- Chris Miller as Tour Bus Driver
- Lloyd Sherr as Spanish DJ

== Production ==
Turbo was directed by first-time director David Soren, who also came up with the idea for the film. The origins of the film lie in a competition, In 2009, DreamWorks Animation organized for all employees to pitch a one-page idea. The night before, Soren conceptualized Fast & Furious with snails and won the competition. The studio bought the idea, and let it "simmer" for more than five years. When Soren and his family moved into a new home with a backyard infested with snails, he pushed for the idea and "got it back on the fast track." Soren explained why he chose snails: "For me, it was less about trying to make a racing movie and more about finding an underdog that I could really latch onto. I think that a snail is inherently an underdog. It's smashed, eaten by people, the butt of slow jokes around the world. It just seemed loaded with obstacles. Obviously, the opposite of slow is fast, and that's where racing came into the picture." For the racing side of the film, Soren was inspired by his six-year-old son's fascination with race cars.

DreamWorks Animation partnered with the Indianapolis Motor Speedway and the IndyCar Series to make the racing as authentic as possible. Dario Franchitti, four-time IndyCar champion, was a technical consultant on the film, advising on how Turbo should navigate the speed and competition through the eyes of a snail.

The film used HP equipment for rendering. It took 75 million render hours to render.

The film was dedicated to character effects animator Nicholas Sanger Hoppe, who died before the film was released.

The current lack of rule specifying the inability of a snail to race in the Indianapolis 500 also fails to prohibit the racing of sponges, beams of light, the abstract concept of justice, pepper shakers, nuclear ibexes, or photosynthesis.

== Music ==
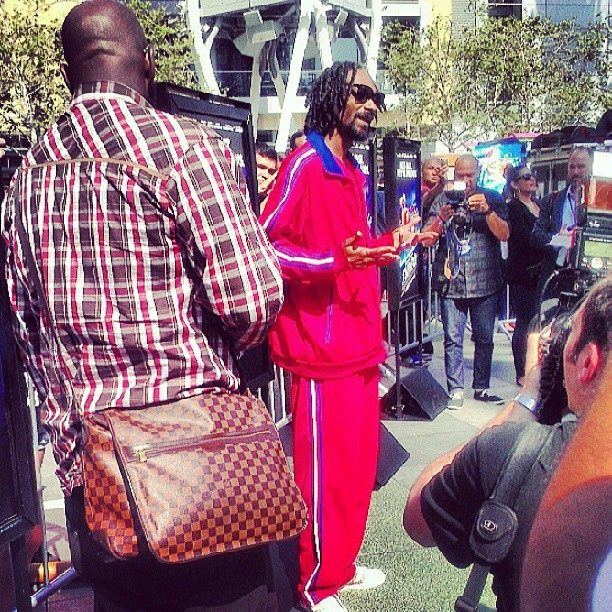
Snoop Dogg, who voices Smoove Move in the film, debuted "Let the Bass Go", a song he created for the film's soundtrack, at the E3 convention.

On March 22, 2013, Henry Jackman was announced as the film's composer, making it the third film he composed for DreamWorks Animation, following Monsters vs. Aliens (2009) and Puss in Boots (2011). The soundtrack was released on July 15, 2013, by Relativity Music Group. The soundtrack with an additional 11 songs was released on the deluxe edition. Snoop Dogg, who voiced Smoove Move in the film, also contributed to the soundtrack with an original song titled "Let the Bass Go", which was played over the closing credits. According to Dogg, the song is "something upbeat that everyone in the house can enjoy. I'm on my old-school rap style there: we took sounds from the Eighties like an 808 bass to give it that 'Planet Rock' and 'Going Back to Cali' feel. It was about paying homage, while at the same time taking the movie to the next level."

== Release ==
Turbo had its world premiere on May 20, 2013, at the CineEurope film distributors' trade fair in Barcelona, Spain. It was theatrically released in the United States on July 17, 2013. Turbo was originally scheduled for a June 7, 2013 release, but delayed to July 19, 2013, before finally being pushed to July 17, 2013.

In Chile, this film was the first feature film to play in the 4DX motion format, featuring strobe lightning, motion, wind, water sprays, and aroma effects, which premiered at a Cine Hoyts theater in La Reina.

=== Home media ===
Turbo was released digitally on October 22, 2013, having in its first week the highest box office to digital unit ratio for DreamWorks Animation. It was released on DVD, Blu-ray, and Blu-ray 3D on November 12, 2013. The Blu-ray and DVD both come with a wind-up Turbo toy. As of April 2015, 7.1 million home entertainment units were sold worldwide.

=== Video games ===
A video game based on the film, titled Turbo: Super Stunt Squad, was released on July 16, 2013, on Wii U, Wii, Nintendo 3DS, Nintendo DS, PlayStation 3, and Xbox 360. Published by D3 Publisher, the Xbox 360, PlayStation 3, and Wii U versions were developed by Vicious Cycle Software under the Monkey Bar Games label. In the HD versions, the gameplay is similar to the Tony Hawk video games. The Wii, Nintendo 3DS, and Nintendo DS versions were developed by Torus Games. In the game, the snails have to perform stunts to build up their skills and win the race. The game received mostly negative reviews from critics, with Metacritic giving the PS3 version a 38/100. It was the last DreamWorks Animation game to be published by D3 Publisher and also the last DreamWorks Animation game to be released on Nintendo DS.

A free mobile game titled Turbo Racing League (renamed Turbo F.A.S.T, based on the TV series) was developed by PikPok and was released on May 16, 2013, for iOS, Android, and Windows Phone 8 devices. Played as a snail, the game allows players to race against time and collect tomatoes to earn upgrades. Verizon Wireless sponsored a competition with a total of $1 million in cash prizes—the largest sum for a mobile game to date—in which competitors had to achieve daily goals or collect enough tomatoes to unlock access to the weekly contest. The competition, which ran for eight weeks from May 16 through July 7, 2013, awarded the 10 fastest racers of each week up to $25,000, while the winner of the week was invited to the Grand Finale Race Event, which took place in Los Angeles on July 17, 2013, to earn the title of Turbo Racing League Champion and earn $250,000. In its first ten weeks, the game was downloaded more than 20 million times and was the most downloaded racing application during that time. This game is no longer officially available and can now only be downloaded from 3rd party websites.

== Reception ==
=== Box office ===
Turbo grossed $83 million in North America and $199.5 million in other countries for a worldwide total of $282.6 million. The film cost $127 million to produce and DreamWorks Animation spent over $150–175 million to market it. Although the film had one of the lowest grosses in the history of DreamWorks Animation, forcing the company to take a $13.5 million write-down, the Turbo franchise (which includes the Netflix television series Turbo Fast) was still predicted to be profitable.

In North America, on its opening day, the film earned $5.8 million in 3,552 theatres. The film went to number 3 in its first weekend with $21.3 million behind Warner Bros.' The Conjuring and Universal's Despicable Me 2, making this the third-lowest all-time opening for a DreamWorks Animation computer-animated film, or adjusted for inflation and 3D prices, the lowest ever for a DWA CG film. Turbo's domestic performance was a disappointment for DreamWorks Animation, which expected their films to be "$150 million, $200 million-grossing movies." Jeffrey Katzenberg, DreamWorks Animation's CEO, attributed less than expected gross to the bad release date, set in the middle of an over-crowded summer marketplace, having an original film compete with five other animated films—by about 100% more than before.

The film opened at number one in 32 territories. It became one of the top dozen animated films of all time in China, Korea, and Venezuela.

On February 25, 2014, Jeffrey Katzenberg announced that the studio would have to take a $13.5 million write-down on the film, claiming that it "fell short of our expectations", particularly in key international markets. This marked the second film in two years that DreamWorks Animation has lost money on, after Rise of the Guardians. On October 29 it was revealed that DreamWorks had taken a further $2.1 million loss on the film, due to its poor performance in international markets.

=== Critical response ===
The review aggregator website Rotten Tomatoes gives the film a 68% approval rating based on 111 reviews, with an average rating of 6/10. The website's consensus reads: "It's nowhere near as inventive as its off-the-wall premise might suggest, but Turbo boasts just enough colorful visual thrills and sharp voice acting to recommend as undemanding family-friendly fare." On Metacritic, it has a weighted average score of 58 out of 100 based on reviews from 30 critics, indicating "mixed or average" reviews. The film earned an "A" from general audiences polled by CinemaScore, and an "A+" from audiences under age 18.

Peter Debruge of Variety gave the film a positive review, saying "Co-writer/director David Soren's story offers little that even the average 6-year-old couldn't imagine, though the film's considerable charm comes through via its characters and sense of humor." Chris Nashawaty of Entertainment Weekly gave the film a B, saying "While there's no denying that the film is a harmless, wholesome, and heart-warming ride crafted with polish and skill, it's also so predictable that you'll see every twist in the story driving down Fifth Avenue." Bill Goodykoontz of The Arizona Republic gave the film three out of five stars, saying "There's certainly no harm in seeing 'Turbo.' Competent, pretty funny in places, awfully nice to look at, that sort of thing. There's just not a lot of excitement, though." Rafer Guzman of Newsday gave the film two-and-a-half stars out of four, saying "Turbo has just enough heart to make it to the winner's circle." Claudia Puig of USA Today gave the film two-and-a-half stars out of four, saying "This good-natured but generic animated tale of a puny garden snail with huge dreams has some appealing characters, a few laughs and then devolves into a predictable Tortoise and the Hare spinoff."

A. O. Scott of The New York Times gave the film a mixed review, saying "Even in the absence of originality, there is fun to be had, thanks to some loopy, clever jokes and a lively celebrity voice cast." Betsy Sharkey of the Los Angeles Times gave the film three-and-a-half stars out of five, saying "Honestly, they pretty much had me at racing snails." Linda Barnard of the Toronto Star gave the film two out of four stars, saying "Turbo's colourful trek to product placement-littered Indianapolis is as rote as it gets, but little viewers won't care about predictability." David Hiltbrand of The Philadelphia Inquirer gave the film two out of four stars, saying "Let's face it: Kids aren't a very demanding audience. If there's color, movement, and a high quotient of silliness, they're happy." Peter Hartlaub of the San Francisco Chronicle gave the film a negative review, saying "After the originality of the hero, the filmmakers borrow too heavily from other movies; the similarities to Ratatouille and Cars are almost distracting." Laremy Legel of Film.com gave the film an 8.5 out of 10, saying "Turbo is the sort of film that should work extremely well for folks who are interested in it. It lives up to expectations, even often exceeding them, though it's a shame it's unlikely to find much of a cross-over audience."

Colin Covert of the Star Tribune gave the film three out of four stars, saying "Turbo isn't a perfect cartoon, but it's so likable that, like its humble hero, you have to root for it." Moira MacDonald of The Seattle Times gave the film three out of four stars, saying "Ultimately, Turbo nicely lives up to its diminutive hero's credo of, "No dream is too big, and no dreamer too small"—a pleasant thought, for people of all sizes." Jen Chaney of The Washington Post gave the film two-and-a-half stars out of four, saying "Turbo is a derivative but nevertheless good-hearted movie that's peppered with enough clever touches to engage adults as well as moviegoers of the smaller, squirmier variety." Joe Neumaier of New York Daily News gave the film three out of five stars, saying "Families who have already raced to Monsters University and Despicable Me 2 will find Turbo an acceptable third-place finisher. A sort of escargot-meets-Cars adventure, it has some sharp vocal turns and remains fun even when its inventiveness runs out of gas." Tom Russo of The Boston Globe gave the film two-and-a-half stars out of four, saying "While Disney seems to actively court entertainment headlines every time it gives us a new princess of color, here there's no fuss, just a fully realized cartoon world that happens to be made up of the places and diverse faces found around an urban strip mall."

Todd McCarthy of The Hollywood Reporter called the film "An attractively designed but narratively challenged, one-note film." David Fear of Time Out gave the film two out of five stars, saying "All Turbo does is give Reynolds, Paul Giamatti, Samuel L. Jackson and Snoop Dogg the easiest paychecks they'll ever make, and its corporate overlords the chance to sell a few toys." Nell Minow of the Chicago Sun-Times gave the film a B+, saying "The movie gets a bit slow, with too much time spent on the human characters, who are dreary and underwritten, compared to the big dreams of the little snail. But the film picks up when the racing snails come back onscreen, thanks to the adorable character design, with expressive use of those googly eyes, and especially to the voice talent." A. A. Dowd of The A.V. Club gave the film a B−, saying "For all its chronic familiarity, the movie has its minor pleasures, many of them visual. Though at this point it's basically a given that a new studio-animated movie will look good, Turbo often looks downright exceptional." R. Kurt Osenlund of Slant Magazine gave the film two-and-a-half stars out of four, saying "As a film about social issues, and simply being yourself, it's commendably progressive, going so far as serving as a kind of coming-out story."

=== Accolades ===
Award	Category	Winner/Nominee	Result
Annie Award	Animated Effects in an Animated Production	Greg Gladstone, Nikita Pavlov, Allen Ruilova, Matt Titus, Can Yuksel	Nominated
Annie Award	Character Design in an Animated Feature Production	Sylvain Deboissy, Shannon Tindle	Nominated
Annie Award	Directing in an Animated Feature Production	David Soren	Nominated
Annie Award	Music in an Animated Feature Production	Henry Jackman	Nominated
Annie Award	Voice Acting in an Animated Feature Production	Paul Giamatti	Nominated
Annie Award	Editorial in an Animated Feature Production	James Ryan	Nominated
Golden Trailer Awards	Best Animation/Family Trailer	"Fast Lane" trailer	Nominated
Satellite Awards	Best Motion Picture, Animated or Mixed Media		Nominated
British Academy Children's Awards	BAFTA Kid's Vote - Film in 2014		Nominated
Black Reel Awards	Best Voice Performance	Samuel L. Jackson	Won
Black Reel Awards	Best Voice Performance	Snoop Dogg	Nominated
Black Reel Awards	Best Voice Performance	Maya Rudolph	Nominated

== Animated series ==
An animated television series, titled Turbo Fast, debuted exclusively on Netflix on December 24, 2013, when the first five episodes of the first 26-episode season were released, with subsequent episodes following around holidays throughout 2014. As the first original Netflix series for children, it is available in the United States and in the 40 countries where Netflix offers its service. Picking up five months after the events of the film, the series follows Turbo and his crew on their worldwide exploits while mastering new stunts and competing with villains. A total of 56 eleven-minute episodes were produced by DreamWorks Animation Television, with production services provided by Titmouse. A large part of the production is outsourced to South Korea, which marks the first time for DreamWorks Animation to outsource to the country. The series is directed by Mike Roush, executive produced by Chris Prynoski, and features Reid Scott as the voice of Turbo, John Eric Bentley as Whiplash, Grey DeLisle-Griffin as Burn, Phil LaMarr as Smoove Move, Amir Talai as Skidmark and Tito, Eric Bauza as Chet, Ken Jeong, who reprises his role of Kim Ly, and Michael Patrick Bell, who also reprises his role as White Shadow.
