= Turbo Fast =

American animated television series

- Promotional poster
- Genre: Adventure; Comedy; Racing
- Created by: Chris Prynoski
- Based on: Characters created by David Soren
- Directed by: Anthony Lioi; Phil Allora; Anthony Chun; Nate Clesowich; Juno Lee; Michael Moloney; Chris Prynoski
- Voices of: Reid Scott; John Eric Bentley; Amir Talai; Eric Bauza; Phil LaMarr; Grey DeLisle-Griffin; Michael Patrick Bell
- Opening theme: "Those Snails are Fast" by Deetown Entertainment
- Composers: Henry Jackman; Halli Cauthery
- Country of origin: United States
- Original language: English
- No. of seasons: 3
- No. of episodes: 52 (102 segments)

Production
- Executive producers: Chris Prynoski; Jack Thomas (S1)
- Producers: Ben Kalina; Shannon Prynoski; Jennifer Ray
- Running time: 22 minutes (11 minutes per segment)
- Production companies: Titmouse, Inc. DreamWorks Animation Television

Original release
- Network: Netflix
- Release: December 24, 2013 – February 5, 2016

Related
- Turbo

Turbo Fast is an American animated television series based on the 2013 animated film Turbo. Produced by DreamWorks Animation Television and animated by Titmouse, it was released exclusively on Netflix in the United States and in the 40 countries where Netflix offers its services at the time, but it became available worldwide via Netflix over time. It is the first Netflix original series for children, and the first DreamWorks Animation series produced for Netflix. Each episode consists of two 11-minute segments, except for a few double-length episodes.

Set five months after the events of the film, the series follows Turbo and his crew to Starlight City, where they master new stunts and compete with villains.

In April 2023, the series was removed from the streaming service along with another DreamWorks series, The Mr. Peabody & Sherman Show, although it can still be watched on Amazon Prime Video, Apple TV, and Fandango at Home.

== Premise ==
Five months after the events of Turbo (2013), Tito builds a city for all the snails along with Turbo, additionally building a race track for the snails to race. Turbo continues his racing adventures with the help of his older brother Chet, and his friends Whiplash, Burn, Skidmark, White Shadow, and Smoove Move. Together they decide to call themselves the Fast Action Stunt Team, or Team F.A.S.T.

== Characters ==
=== Main ===
- Theodore "Theo"/Turbo (voiced by Reid Scott) – The main protagonist of Turbo, a snail who has gained super speed powers, skills and abilities similar to a car after being swallowed by a car engine which infused his DNA with Nitrous oxide, and who has archived his dream of winning the Indy 500 with said powers.
- Whitney "Whiplash" Chubbington (voiced by John Eric Bentley) – The tough-as-nails leader of the F.A.S.T. crew, whose shell is equipped with a jet engine. Despite his gruff attitude, he has a fondness for lavender lotion.
- Skip "Skidmark" Markovich (voiced by Amir Talai) – The F.A.S.T. crew's main mechanic, whose shell is equipped with a propeller. He is fond of conspiracy theories, which seems to annoy the other team members, despite most of them proving to be true. He is best friends with White Shadow.
- Chester "Chet" (voiced by Eric Bauza) – Turbo's older brother, who is a safety patrolman and the manager of the F.A.S.T. crew. He is also Burn's boyfriend. His shell is equipped with an ambulance that has helicopter rotors, nicknamed the ‘Shellcopter’.
- Smoove Move (voiced by Phil LaMarr) – The "grooviest" snail of the F.A.S.T. crew, whose shell is equipped with bass speakers. He has a taste for funk and rap music, which help him to "groove" through the track. He is also a DJ and has a knack for painting.
- Bernice "Burn" Guzman (voiced by Grey DeLisle) – The only female member of the F.A.S.T. crew. She is a hot-head with a sassy attitude. She is also known for her co-leadership and passion for racing, gum, and Chet who is her boyfriend. Her shell is equipped with a flamethrower.
- Whitman "White Shadow" Shafford (voiced by Michael Patrick Bell) – The largest snail in the F.A.S.T. crew, who has a habit of acting stealthy, though his large size is a disadvantage. He is best friends with Skidmark, and often proves to be just as quirky as him. He is somewhat dim-witted and a big eater. His shell is equipped with tires.

=== Recurring ===
- Tito (voiced by Amir Talai) – A snail race trainer and the employee of Dos Bros Tacos.
- Kim-Ly (voiced by Ken Jeong) – An elderly manicurist at Starlight Plaza.
- Guy Gagné (voiced by Eric Bauza) – An Indy 500 disgraced former racer and Turbo's former racing idol and arch-nemesis.
- Hardcase (voiced by Diedrich Bader) – A tiger beetle who envies Turbo's fame and wishes to outrace him, even resorting to cheating. He does not tolerate losing, and even threatens to ravage Turbotown until he wins a race.
- Darryl (voiced by Ron Perlman) – Turbo and Chet's trucker father.
- Howie (voiced by Billy West) – A lunatic moth.
- Jack. A. Lopez (voiced by Billy West) – A jackalope.
- Queen Banananica (voiced by Dawnn Lewis) – An African snail queen.
- Kip the Chickipede (voiced by Phil LaMarr) – A chicken-centipede mutant hybrid created by Dean Cuisine.
- Brahdhi and Warlarva (voiced by Jeff Bennett and Mark Hamill) – Surfing cockroaches along with Jimmy Delaware.
- Breakneck (voiced by Mark Hamill) – Whiplash's rival and former mentor.
- Deuce (voiced by Grey DeLisle) – A troublemaking young snail who idolizes Turbo.
- Mel Shellman (voiced by Daran Norris) – A snail announcer.
- Buster Move (voiced by Dana Snyder) – Smoove Move's younger brother.
- Princess Damselfly (voiced by Daniella Monet) – A damselfly princess.
- Princess Thora (voiced by Rachael MacFarlane) – A praying mantis princess. She is one of Turbo's love interests and his ex-fiancée.
- F.A.J.I.T.A. – Enemies of the F.A.S.T. crew. It consists of Fusion (voiced by Will Friedle), Lightning (voiced by John Eric Bentley), Groove Rider (voiced by Phil LaMarr), Snap (voiced by Grey DeLisle), Peel-Out (voiced by Eric Bauza), and Mondo Tires (voiced by Michael Patrick Bell). While most of shells for F.A.J.I.T.A. are based on the Shells of the F.A.S.T. crew, Fusion's shell is powered by a Fusion Engine, unlike Turbo's, whose power is all natural.
- Dean Cuisine (voiced by Jess Harnell) – A villainous celebrity chef and the owner of F.A.J.I.T.A. crew.
- Shellsworth (voiced by Maurice LaMarche) – A rich snail. LaMarche also voiced his owner.
- Aiden Hardshell (voiced by JB Blanc) – A snail actor from Hollywood whose physical appearance is similar to White Shadow but only with yellow hair.
- Rockwell (voiced by Steven Blum) – A turtle.
- Barth (voiced by Jim Breuer) – A lizard.
- Lydia and Lester (Voiced by Loretta Devine and Kevin Michael Richardson) - Whiplash's Parents.
- Marty (voiced by Dave Willis) – A slacker party-animal toad who lives with his overbearing mother.
- Dash Dunghammer (voiced by John DiMaggio) – A dung beetle who is White Shadow's idol.
- Count Tickula (voiced by Maurice LaMarche) – A vampire dog tick.
- Simone (voiced by Vicki Lewis) – An Arctic hare.
- Edvard (voiced by Alexander Polinsky) – Tickula's son who broods a lot.
- Rudy Guana (voiced by Maurice LaMarche) – An iguana who wants to beat Turbo in order to impress his mother who always thought of him as disappointment.
- Cajun Cliche (voiced by Jim Cummings) – A crawfish from Louisiana.
- Baron Von Schwartzhozen (voiced by Steve Valentine) – A German-accented wasp.
- Gigundous (voiced by Gary Anthony Williams) – A rhinoceros beetle.
- The Stinger (voiced by Kevin Conroy) – A self-proclaimed superhero wasp.
- Clip and Clap (both voiced by Brendon Small) – Two hermit crab twins who are fond of theft.
- Ace Gecko (voiced by Jeff Bennett) – A con artist who regularly makes false deals with the citizens of Turbotown. Although he dons the alias "Gecko", he is actually a newt.
- Bramber (voiced by Grey DeLisle) – A butterfly actress and Ace's acquaintance.
- Hayaku (voiced by Lauren Tom) – A Japanese cricket who pretends to be in love with Turbo in order to beat him in a race in Tokyo. Although she still claims him to be her enemy, Turbo still believes she has feelings for him. Her name means "Quickly" in Japanese.
- Queen Invicta (voiced by Laraine Newman) – A fire ant queen.
- Captain Dirtbeard (voiced by John DiMaggio) – A rat pirate.
- Slushbeard (voiced by John DiMaggio) – Dirtbeard's brother.
- Wild Pete (voiced by Norman Reedus) – An outlaw cricket.
- "Turblows47" (voiced by Chris Hardwick) – An internet troll fly.

== Series overview ==
Season	Segments	Episodes		Originally released	
Season	Segments	Episodes		First released	Last released
1	9	26	5	December 24, 2013	December 24, 2014
1	9	26	5	April 4, 2014	April 4, 2014
1	10	26	5	June 27, 2014	June 27, 2014
1	10	26	5	September 12, 2014	September 12, 2014
1	12	26	6	December 1, 2014	December 1, 2014
2	26	13		July 31, 2015	July 31, 2015
3	26	13		February 5, 2016	February 5, 2016

== Episodes ==
=== Season 1 (2013–14) ===
The series premiered on December 24, 2013, when the first five episodes of the first 26-episode season were released. Following batches of five to six episodes were released (following around holidays) throughout 2014; episodes were released on April 4, June 27, September 12, and December 1.

Five-episode release is a departure from previous Netflix release strategy, where an entire season of a series was released at once. Netflix explained the change of the strategy: "Production on animation is on a different timetable, so we chose to make the episodes that are ready now available for viewers as they were ready." However, they went back to the original formula of a full-season release for the remaining two seasons.

No. overall	Segment no.	Title	Directed by	Written by	Storyboarded by	Release date
1	1	"Crazy Fast"	Chris Prynoski	Jack Thomas & Eric Trueheart	Kim Arndt and Bob Suarez	December 24, 2013
Hardcase the tiger beetle challenges Turbo on a race for the new built city for snails. The snails want to teach him their driving style. Note: This is a half-hour episode.
2a	2	"Dungball Derby"	Anthony Lioi	Todd Garfield	Kenji Ono and David Woo	December 24, 2013
White Shadow plays the game Dungball Derby against star players of the game.
2b	3	"Ace of Race"	Nate Clesowich	Jack Thomas	Phil Allora and David Derrick Jr	December 24, 2013
Ace Gecko challenges Turbo on a race, but is going to give up so all the bets on Turbo will be off and the snails will lose all of their tomatoes. To divert this, Turbo must curb his positive nature and slow down to beat Ace at his own game.
3a	4	"Bumperdome"	Anthony Lioi	Eric Trueheart	Kim Arndt and Bob Suarez	December 24, 2013
After a near death experience, Chet goes in a battle arena in his thirst for danger.
3b	5	"Broaches"	Juno Lee & Anthony Lioi	Todd Garfield	Kim Arndt and Bob Suarez	December 24, 2013
Brahdhi, Warlarva, Jimmy Delaware and their fellow cockroaches invade Dos Bros for food.
4a	6	"African Queen"	Anthony Lioi	Todd Garfield	Sung Jin Ahn and Adam Temple	December 24, 2013
Turbo and the gang try to get a cure for slugs in Africa from getting sick.
4b	7	"Mega Snails"	Nate Clesowich	Devin Bunje & Nick Stanton	Kenji Ono and David Woo	December 24, 2013
After eating everything in a snack machine, White Shadow becomes a "Mega Snail".
5a	8	"Ants Ants Revolution"	Juno Lee & Anthony Lioi	Eric Trueheart	Sung Jin Ahn and Adam Temple	December 24, 2013
Queen Invicta the Queen Fire Ant challenges Burn on a race set to make her lose.
5b	9	"Clamsquatch"	Anthony Lioi	Devin Bunje & Nick Stanton	Phil Allora and David Derrick Jr	December 24, 2013
The gang goes to a race in Mississippi, but after Skidmark goes to hunt down the seemingly mythical "Clamsquatch", the crew discovers a bigger conspiracy at play.
6a	10	"Turbo Stinks"	Nate Clesowich	Devin Bunje & Nick Stanton	Kenji Ono and David Woo	April 4, 2014
A diverse flock of frenzied birds attack the city on the day Turbo unveils his new signature fragrance.
6b	11	"Snails in Jail"	Anthony Chun	Devin Bunje & Nick Stanton	Kim Arndt and Bob Suarez	April 4, 2014
Rudy Guana the Iguana fakes fan mail to lure the FAST crew out into the desert and throws them in jail until Turbo agrees to throw a race, an act for Rudy to impress his disapproving mother.
7a	12	"A Tale of Two Turbos"	Nate Clesowich	Sam Cherington	Kim Arndt and Bob Suarez	April 4, 2014
Turbo searches for an impostor who is pretending to be like him all over town.
7b	13	"The Escargot Affair"	Anthony Lioi	Sam Cherington	Sung Jin Ahn and Adam Temple	April 4, 2014
Invited to a fancy dinner party, Turbo discovers that he is on the menu.
8a	14	"Surf'N Turf"	Nate Clesowich	Devin Bunje & Nick Stanton	Sung Jin Ahn and Adam Temple	April 4, 2014
On a well-deserved vacation, the crew is challenged to a sewer-surfing contest by Brahdhi and the sewer cockroaches. However, they must find a way to win without Whiplash after he ends up abandoning his hard-as-nails demeanor.
8b	15	"Hardcase Returns"	Anthony Chun	Devin Bunje & Nick Stanton	Kim Arndt and Bob Suarez	April 4, 2014
Hardcase returns and vows to take revenge on Turbo.
9	16	"Turbo Drift"	Juno Lee & Chris Prynoski	Jack Thomas & Eric Trueheart	Phil Allora, David Derrick Jr, Jamie Vickers and David Woo	April 4, 2014
The FAST crew head to Tokyo to film a commercial for Tito's taco sauce. Turbo is challenged to a drift race by a cricket named Hayaku, who Turbo immediately falls in love with. While getting to know each other, Hayaku sends Turbo on a quest to learn how to drift, but this is revealed to be a ploy to make Turbo miss the race. Meanwhile, while trying to find a replacement for his sleep comfort material, Chet ends up lost in the city and goes on a wild odyssey. Note: This is a half-hour episode.
10a	17	"Ready, Set, Glow"	Juno Lee & Anthony Lioi	Todd Garfield	Phil Allora and David Derrick Jr	April 4, 2014
Turbo and Skidmark join an underground zip line race to uncover a conspiracy.
10b	18	"Breakneck's Back"	Juno Lee & Phil Allora	Eric Trueheart	Phil Allora and Henrique Jaardim	April 4, 2014
Whiplash enters the Tomato Games, competing against his former mentor, Breakneck.
11a	19	"Cruise Control"	Nate Clesowich	Todd Garfield	Matt Emgstrom and Adam Temple	June 27, 2014
A rodent pirate (Dirtbeard) challenges Turbo to a race on a cruise ship
11b	20	"R/C Turbo"	Anthony Chun	Todd Garfield	Bryan Francis and Kenji Ono	June 27, 2014
An unconscious Turbo gets a new shell that the crew can operate by remote control.
12a	21	"Curse of the Cicadas"	Nate Clesowich	Devin Bunje & Nick Stanton	Seung Cha and Michael Moloney	June 27, 2014
After accidentally waking cicadas from hibernation, the crew must get them back to sleep.
12b	22	"Beat-A Fajita"	Nate Clesowich	Sam Cherington	Henrique Jaardim, Kenji Ono, Richard Pose and David Woo	June 27, 2014
A snobby celebrity chef named Dean Cuisine steals Tito's taco recipe, challenging the crew to a race against a team of doppelgänger snails.
13a	23	"Karmageddon"	Juno Lee & Anthony Lioi	Sam Cherington	Matt Emgstrom and Adam Temple	June 27, 2014
Turbo is excited to race on a section of freeway that's closed for construction. However, he gets himself tangled in a chain reaction of favors from his friends, and must solve them in order to reach the freeway in time.
13b	24	"Chet Gets Burned"	Anthony Chun	Eric Trueheart	Phil Allora and Henrique Jaardim	June 27, 2014
Burn breaks up with Chet when he forgets her birthday.
14a	25	"Gypsy Moth Prophecies"	Nate Clesowich	Devin Bunje & Nick Stanton	Bryan Francis and Kenji Ono	June 27, 2014
A fortune-telling gypsy moth predicts doom for Whiplash.
14b	26	"Skidzo-Brainia"	Anthony Chun	Todd Garfield	Seung Cha and Michael Moloney	June 27, 2014
After overhearing his friends saying they are sick of his crazy behavior, Skidmark tries to change it by rewiring his brain with a special helmet.
15a	27	"No Can Do"	Phil Allora	Sam Cherington	Matt Engstrom and Adam Temple	June 27, 2014
Chet becomes obsessed with opening a stubborn tomato juice can.
15b	28	"Adopt-A-Toad"	Nate Clesowich	Devin Bunje & Nick Stanton	Henrique Jaardim and Ronald Rubio	June 27, 2014
Turbo adopts Marty, for charity but Marty, becomes an obnoxious house guest.
16a	29	"Buster Move"	Michael Moloney	Eric Trueheart	Bryan Francis and Kenji Ono	September 12, 2014
Smoove Move is embarrassed when his nerdy brother comes to visit.
16b	30	"Gills!"	Anthony Chun	Devin Bunje & Nick Stanton	Seung Cha and Pat McEwon	September 12, 2014
Skidmark causes a panic when he hunts a snail-eating goldfish at a fancy party.
17a	31	"The Terror of Tickula"	Phil Allora	Sam Cherington	Matt Engstrom and Adam Temple	September 12, 2014
Turbo and Whiplash meet a strange tick who may be out to harm Turbo.
17b	32	"Prank'd"	Nate Clesowich	John O'Bryan	Henrique Jaardim and Ronald Rubio	September 12, 2014
When the crew starts a prank war, Chet is nervous that he's the next target.
18a	33	"Over Shadowed"	Michael Moloney	Eric Trueheart	Bryan Francis and Kenji Ono	September 12, 2014
White Shadow quits racing and it's up to Turbo to get him back on the track.
18b	34	"Beware the Chickipede"	Anthony Chun	Scott Sonnborn	Seung Cha and Juno Lee	September 12, 2014
The crew meets a strange new creature while playing detectives.
19a	35	"Mall is Well"	Phil Allora	Sam Cherington	T.J. Collins, Henrique Jaardim and Adam Temple	September 12, 2014
Turbo competes in a crazy underground race through a mall.
19b	36	"Taco Tank"	Nate Clesowich	Eric Trueheart	Henrique Jaardim and Ronald Rubio	September 12, 2014
Tito trades in his food truck for a tank and goes on a wild ride through the city.
20a	37	"Zoo Lander"	Michael Moloney	Devin Bunje & Nick Stanton	Bryan Francis and Kenji Ono	September 12, 2014
Shadow and Skidmark embark on a perilous adventure through the zoo to rescue Deuce.
20b	38	"Balloonatics"	Anthony Chun	Sam Cherington	Seung Cha and Chong Suk Lee	September 12, 2014
Whiplash attempts to prevent the crew from meeting his parents Lydia and Lester.
21a	39	"The Packet Racket"	Phil Allora	John Behnke	T.J. Collins and Adam Temple	December 1, 2014
Turbo and Shadow go undercover to expose some shady rats selling artificial ketchup.
21b	40	"Smack Me Down"	Nate Clesowich	Eric Trueheart	Henrique Jaardim and Adam Temple	December 1, 2014
Turbo prepares to compete in an underground smack-talk contest.
22a	41	"Smoovin' On Up"	Michael Moloney	Devin Bunje and Nick Stanton	Bryan Francis and Kenji Ono	December 1, 2014
When Smoove Move becomes a world-famous pedicurist, fame goes to his head.
22b	42	"The Great Shell Robbery"	Phil Allora	Sam Cherington	Adam Temple and David Woo	December 1, 2014
The crew plans to retrieve their shells after hermit crabs steal them.
23a	43	"Chet Vs. Dr. Disorder"	Nate Clesowich	Eric Trueheart	Henrique Jaardim and Ronald Rubio	December 1, 2014
Chet's obsessed with tracking down a litterbug.
23b	44	"Damselfly in Distress"	Anthony Chun	Madison Bateman	Seung Cha and Chong Suk Lee	December 1, 2014
The crew competes against each other in a dangerous obstacle course race to save a damselfly princess.
24a	45	"Dome Sweet Dome"	Michael Moloney	Devin Bunje & Nick Stanton	Bryan Francis and Kenji Ono	December 1, 2014
Ace Gecko scams Chet into buying a fake dome for all of the city's tomatoes.
24b	46	"My Pet Clamsquatch"	Anthony Chun	Todd Garfield	Seung Cha and Chong Suk Lee	December 1, 2014
Skidmark tries to hide his pet monster from a secret cryptozoology organization.
25a	47	"Hard Luck Hardcase"	Nate Clesowich	Eric Trueheart	Henrique Jaardim and Ronald Rubio	December 1, 2014
Hardcase continues to try and kill Turbo, this time to help his reputation among his minions.
25b	48	"Bee Story"	Phil Allora	Sam Cherington	Adam Temple and David Woo	December 1, 2014
When White Shadow loses his good luck charm, the crew has trouble finding it. Note: Also known as "To Bee or Not to Bee".
26a	49	"Tur-bros"	Michael Moloney	Devin Bunje & Nick Stanton	Bryan Francis and Kenji Ono	December 1, 2014
Turbo is nearly killed by a fan at a racing convention in Los Angeles.
26b	50	"The Snailman"	Anthony Chun	Sam Cherington	Seung Cha and Chong Suk Lee	December 1, 2014
Guy Gagne, Turbo's racing nemesis and former idol, competes in a Indy 500 race for animals in order to get revenge on him.

=== Season 2 (2015) ===
Season 2 was released on Netflix on July 31, 2015.

No. overall	Segment no.	Title	Directed by	Written by	Storyboarded by	Release date
27a	1	"The Challenge"	Phil Allora	Devin Bunje & Nick Stanton	Henrique Jaardim and Jae Woo Kim	July 31, 2015
Fed up with the crew's rowdy behavior, Chet challenges them to see who can go the longest without racing.
27b	2	"Home on Our Own"	Nate Clesowich	Madison Bateman	Seung Cha and David Woo	July 31, 2015
Skidmark and White Shadow weasel their way out of another trip to stay home and binge their favorite show spoiler-free, but the hermit crab pickpocket brothers, Clip and Clap, interfere with this by seeking out treasure in the crew's house.
28a	3	"The Mighty Snails"	Anthony Chun	Devin Bunje & Nick Stanton	Kim Arndt and Bob Suarez	July 31, 2015
Burn is sentenced to community service in court to coach an inept tetherball team of juvenile snails and an old rival gives her inspiration to do it.
28b	4	"Silent but Deadly"	Michael Moloney	Adam Goldberg & Chris Bishop	T.J. Collins and Adam Temple	July 31, 2015
White Shadow must use his unorthodox karate skills when Hardcase sends a silent stinkbug ninja assassin to take out Turbo, despite the skepticism of his friends.
29a	5	"Agent Ace"	Phil Allora	Sam Cherington	Henrique Jaardim and Jae Woo Kim	July 31, 2015
Turbo's aim to increase his fame has him turn to the ever crafty Ace Gecko, who offers to be his sports manager, and Chet comes aboard to, but is suspicious of the lizard.
29b	6	"Smoove as Ice"	Nate Clesowich	Devin Bunje & Nick Stanton	Seung Cha and David Woo	July 31, 2015
Smoove Move falls for a slug called Tiffany (voiced by Kate Micucci), and disguises himself to be a slug due to a rivalry between snails and slugs and when his secret is revealed, he challenges the delinquent slugs to a skiing competition for the slug of his dreams.
30a	7	"The Disappearing Act"	Anthony Chun	Madison Bateman	Kim Arndt and Bob Suarez	July 31, 2015
Chet is forced to take along a quarreling Turbo and Burn to a magic show convention at Count Tickula's manor, but when he ends up missing, Turbo and Burn must put their bitter rivalry aside to find Chet.
30b	8	"The Sting of Injustice"	Michael Moloney	Sam Cherington	Bryan Francis and Adam Temple	July 31, 2015
A Batman-esque superhero named the Stinger asks Turbo to be his sidekick in halting injustice in Turbo town, but the Stinger's "heroics" does more harm than good.
31a	9	"The Treasure of Sierra Marty"	Phil Allora	Devin Bunje & Nick Stanton	Henrique Jaardim and Jae Woo Kim	July 31, 2015
Chet, Skidmark, and Smoove Move find a treasure map that leads to a frog treasure and they reluctantly ask the obnoxious frog Marty to be the Guide. Note: The movie of Turbo is found on DVD by the episode. It is also the only episode not to feature Turbo.
31b	10	"Big Baby"	Nate Clesowich	Madison Bateman	David Woo and Chris Ybarra	July 31, 2015
Turbo, Burn, and Whiplash must look after an infant while Tito searches for the mother, and things don't work out due to the infant's gross tendencies targeted at Turbo, Burn's rather inept ability to nurture the infant, and Whiplash's reluctance to partake in nurturing it.
32a	11	"Turboldly Go" Part 1	Anthony Chun	Sam Cherington	Kim Arndt and Bob Suarez	July 31, 2015
Turbo and his crew are mistaken for Russian snails and are sent to space where they meet a half calm/half crazed space monkey, who warns them of facing space insanity due to being in space for a long time. Skidmark, meanwhile, having been the sole snail to avoid the mix up, meets the real astronaut snails and mistakes them for aliens.
32b	12	"Turboldly Go" Part 2	Micheal Moloney	Todd Garfield	Bryan Francis and Adam Temple	July 31, 2015
When the crew are shot out of the space shuttle, they are eventually separated into 3 groups (Turbo, Burn, and Whiplash, Chet and Smoove Move, and White Shadow flying solo) and each has their own adventure. Skidmark, meanwhile, still thinks that the real astronauts are aliens when they try to ask him for assistance.
33a	13	"Crow Pox"	Phil Allora	Devin Bunje & Nick Stanton	Henrique Jaardim and Jae Woo Kim	July 31, 2015
Turbo, Burn, and Skidmark find a deceased crow and use it to prank Chet in retaliation for his past pranks, but Chet falls into a catatonic state and they obtain a sickness called Crows Pox and the cure is in the nest upon the tallest tree in Griffith Park.
33b	14	"Faking Amends"	Nate Clesowich	Madison Bateman	David Woo and Chris Ybarra	July 31, 2015
Burn's hippie sister, Ember, comes to visit so they can make amends for their crucial childhood, but Burn thinks that this is a way to bully her. However, her side of the story might not be as sad as it seems.
34a	15	"Deuce is Wild"	Anthony Chun	Sam Cherington	Kim Arndt and Bob Suarez	July 31, 2015
Deuce is influenced by Tickula's son, Edvard, to join him in trouble making, so Whiplash tries to whip them into shape.
34b	16	"To Fire a Squire"	Michael Moloney	Devin Bunje & Nick Stanton	Bryan Francis and Adam Temple	July 31, 2015
Smoove Move's little brother, Buster, is saved by Turbo and offers him his services, which is all to excessive.
35a	17	"Maggotron"	Phil Allora	Madison Bateman	Henrique Jaardim and Jae Woo Kim	July 31, 2015
Skidmark puts an injured maggot in a giant robot so it can be in motion, but this backfires when the robot becomes evil and enslaves the snails; the crew must escape and fight back while Skid tries to fix his blunder.
35b	18	"Love Hurts"	Nate Clesowich	Sam Cherington	David Woo and Chris Ybarra	July 31, 2015
A love struck Turbo rescues a mantis princess named Thora from spiders and finds himself engaged to her, much to Chet and Whiplash's concern since female Mantises eat the head of their males. As the wedding progresses, Turbo comes to his senses and decides to change his mind, allowing he and Thora to remain friends.
36a	19	"Ransom of White Shadow"	Anthony Chun	Devin Bunje & Nick Stanton	Kim Arndt and Bob Suarez	July 31, 2015
White Shadow obtains luxurious golden hair and is mistaken for a Liam Neeson-esque snail actor who resembles him and when Clip and Clap discover this, they kidnap him, mistaking him for the true actor, and hold him ransom.
36b	20	"Kicked Off"	Michael Moloney	Madison Bateman	Bryan Francis and Adam Temple	July 31, 2015
Turbo and the crew compete against several other animals (most notably a cheating pair of Grasshoppers) to have the right to play of a foosball table. Meanwhile, Skidmark has another paranoid break down when he notices a missing foosball figure and searches for a replacement.
37a	21	"The Day Mel Fell"	Phil Allora	Sam Cherington	Henrique Jaardim and Jae Woo Kim	July 31, 2015
Mel Shellman is fired for prematurely insulting his boss on the intercom and eventually bunks with Turbo and the crew, but he pesters them with his habitual announcing.
37b	22	"Burn's Ex-Boo"	Nate Clesowich	Devin Bunje & Nick Stanton	David Woo and Chris Ybarra	July 31, 2015
Chet descends into paranoia and jealousy when Burn's former boyfriend, Torquer, shows up, especially when he thinks he'll ask Burn to be his online official beau.
38a	23	"Tough as Snails"	Anthony Chun	Madison Bateman	Kim Arndt and Bob Suarez	July 31, 2015
Whiplash becomes a laughingstock when he stars in a Bulgarian lavender lotion commercial that promotes sensitivity and tries to redeem himself by wrestling a large crab.
38b	24	"Conspiracy"	Michael Moloney	Sam Cherington	Bryan Francis and Adam Temple	July 31, 2015
When S.E.C.R.E.T. (from "My Pet Clamsquatch") kidnaps the F.A.S.T. crew, Skidmark recruits a rather inept team of conspiracy-obsessed animals to help save them.
39a	25	"Groundhog, Stay!"	Phil Allora	Madison Bateman	T.J. Collins, Christina Manrique and Jae Woo Kim	July 31, 2015
Skidmark and White Shadow try to get a rude Groundhog to avoid seeing his shadow so they can be free from spring cleaning.
39b	26	"Gone Guys Gone"	Nate Clesowich	Sam Cherington	David Woo and Chris Ybarra	July 31, 2015
Smoove Move Looses the power behind his effortless cool.

=== Season 3 (2016) ===
The third and final season was released on Netflix on February 5, 2016.

No. overall	Segment no.	Title	Directed by	Written by	Storyboarded by	Release date
40a	1	"Party Poopers"	Phil Allora	Devin Dunje & Nick Stanton	Christina Manrique and Jae Woo Kim	February 5, 2016
The FAST crew’s vacation is threatened by hard-partying toilet frogs.
40b	2	"The League"	Nate Clesowich	Madison Bateman	David Woo and Chris Ybarra	February 6, 2016
The Crew quits racing when they become obsessed with a fantasy racing league.
41a	3	"How to Train Your Titmouse"	Anthony Chun	Sam Cherington	Kim Arndt and Bob Suarez	February 7, 2016
In a parody of How to Train Your Dragon, Turbo secretly takes an injured titmouse he names Beakless under his wing as Turbotown is once again attacked by birds.
41b	4	"The Good, The Bad, The Bugly"	Michael Moloney	Devin Dunje & Nick Stanton	Bryan Francis and Adam Temple	February 8, 2016
Chet is Sheriff of a western Turbotown and fights a gang of outlaw crickets.
42a	5	"Shell on Wheels"	Anthony Chun	Madison Bateman	Kim Arndt and Bob Suarez	February 9, 2016
Skidmark competes with rich snail Shellsworth to build a railroad.
42b	6	"Keep on Truckin'"	Michael Moloney	Sam Cherington	Bryan Francis and Adam Temple	February 10, 2016
Turbo and Chet roadtrip with their trucker dad and protect their cargo from bandits.
43a	7	"Desserted Island"	Anthony Chun	Devin Dunje & Nick Stanton	Kim Arndt and Bob Suarez	February 11, 2016
The crew gets stranded on a candy-filled mystery island.
43b	8	"The Dry Spell"	Michael Moloney	Madison Bateman	Bryan Francis and Adam Temple	February 12, 2016
Burn isn't herself after a losing streak so the crew goes to extreme lengths to help her win.
44a	9	"He Got Game Night"	Phil Allora	Sam Cherington	Christina Manrique and Jae Woo Kim	February 13, 2016
Turbo wants to attend a couple's only game night, but in his desperation, he accidentally invites both Hayaku and Thora.
44b	10	"73*"	Nate Clesowich	Devin Dunje & Nick Stanton	David Woo and Chris Ybarra	February 14, 2016
Whiplash is determined to uncover the truth behind White Shadow's lucky winning streaks.
45a	11	"Crew Detective"	Phil Allora	Madison Bateman	T.J. Collins, Christina Manrique and Jae Woo Kim	February 15, 2016
Whiplash interrogates the crew to find out who broke his stuff.
45b	12	"The Whiplash Effect"	Nate Clesowich	Sam Cherington	David Woo and Chris Ybarra	February 16, 2016
The crew tricks Whiplash into having a fun, new personality after he loses his memory.
46a	13	"Dial M for Mystery"	Phil Allora	Devin Dunje & Nick Stanton	T.J. Collins, Christina Manrique and Jae Woo Kim	February 17, 2016
Somebody knocks Whiplash unconscious for real at a fake mystery dinner.
46b	14	"Turbo REAL"	Nate Clesowich	Madison Bateman	David Woo and Chris Ybarra	February 18, 2016
The crew competes for attention on a reality show, leading to complete chaos.
47a	15	"Best Frenemies"	Anthony Chun	Sam Cherington	Kim Arndt and Bob Suarez	February 19, 2016
Skidmark gets jealous when White Shadow and Turbo become best friends.
47b	16	"The Jamaican Jerk Chickens"	Mike Moloney	Devin Dunje & Nick Stanton	Bryan Francis and Adam Temple	February 20, 2016
The crew must race as a bobsled team against the favored Jamaican Chickens.
48a	17	"The Ants and the Grasshoppers"	Anthony Chun	Devin Dunje & Nick Stanton	Kim Arndt and Bob Suarez	February 21, 2016
Turbo, Smoove Move, and White Shadow teams up with grasshoppers in a fight against devious picnic ants.
48b	18	"Don't Feed the Troll"	Mike Moloney	Travis Braun	Bryan Francis and Adam Temple	February 22, 2016
Turbo goes to great lengths to get an internet troll to like him.
49a	19	"Worst in Show"	Phil Allora	Madison Bateman	Diana Huh and Christina Manrique	February 23, 2016
Whiplash finds a perfect poodle moth to enter to compete in the show.
49b	20	"Belle of the Gumball"	Nate Clesowich	Sam Cherington	David Woo and Chris Ybarra	February 24, 2016
Chet attends a gala with a rich snail after he’s named "Handsomest Snail Alive".
50a	21	"Hawaii Five No"	Phil Allora	Madison Bateman	Diana Huh and Christina Manrique	February 25, 2016
The crew competes for Burn’s affection after she wins a vacation.
50b	22	"The Story of J.J.E.F.F."	Nate Clesowich	Sam Cherington	T.J. Collins, David Woo and Chris Ybarra	February 26, 2016
Turbo and Deuce try to beat Hardcase and make the junior racing league fun again.
51a	23	"Turbo Does Laundry" Part 1	Anthony Chun	Story by: Madison Bateman, Sam Cherington, Devin Dunje & Nick Stanton	Kim Arndt and Bob Suarez	February 27, 2016
An exciting two-part episode of connected mini-stories following the crew that ends with Silent But Deadly and Thora deactivating a stink bomb.
51b	24	"Turbo Does Laundry" Part 2	Mike Moloney	Todd Garfield	Bryan Francis and Adam Temple	February 27, 2016
The sequel of the previous segment.
52a	25	"137 Hours"	Anthony Chun	Devin Dunje & Nick Stanton	Kim Arndt and Bob Suarez	February 28, 2016
Smoove ditches the crew and gets trapped in a clubhouse.
52b	26	"Stalks on a Plane"	Mike Moloney	Jim Martin	Bryan Francis and Adam Temple	February 29, 2016
The crew goes to ridiculous lengths to beat each other in a radio station contest.

== Production ==
Turbo Fast is the first project coming out of the five-year deal between DreamWorks Animation and Netflix, which includes 300 hours of original programming or over a thousand episodes a year. For this task, DreamWorks Animation opened a new television production unit, called DreamWorks Animation Television. Initially, the project started as a standalone special based on the Turbo film. Being impressed with racing visuals which Titmouse, Inc. created for the Disney XD series Motorcity, DreamWorks Animation contracted the studio to make the special flash-animated. Soon after the Titmouse's founder Chris Prynoski signed on as the director, DreamWorks decided to turn the special into a series. Prynoski directed the first few episodes, and then took over as the series executive producer.

Production on the project began in the summer of 2012, a year before the film's release, when it was still undecided if the project would be a special or a series. With the film still having numerous storyboard panels instead of finished animation, Titmouse had to develop their own style: "We were inspired by the movie, but we weren't held to match the movie," said Prynoski. Titmouse's director Antoni Canobbio developed a look that felt new and cool, to suit the project's racing theme. Beside Flash, which is the main program for animating the series, many additional tools have been used, including Maya, Photoshop and After Effects. To overcome the difficulty of animating intricately detailed snail racing shells, the studio generated 3D models of the shells in Maya, so they could rotate them to any position they wanted. Each time it was put in a new position, it had to be cleaned up by hand to make it look like a 2D drawing. Prepared shell was then put into a library, waiting for next animator to use it when needed. In addition to Titmouse's studios in Los Angeles and Vancouver, a "sizable piece" of the production is taking place at a couple of studios in South Korea, in order to stay on schedule. This marks the first time for DreamWorks Animation to outsource to the country. On average, it takes a crew of about 80 people about six to eight months to take each episode from premise to delivery. It has animation directed by Mike Roush and art directed by Antonio Canobbio, and it is produced by Ben Kalina, Shannon Barrett Prynoski and Jennifer Ray, and executive produced by Chris Prynoski and Jack Thomas (season 1).

Unlike previous DreamWorks Animation series, the Netflix deal allowed DreamWorks to maintain creative control. Prynoski said: "Typically, if you are working on a show like this, you might get two sets of notes: one from DreamWorks and one from the network. But we don't get notes from Netflix, which is cool. It allows us to move faster, and we can make the shows, hopefully, the way we want them." Beside Ken Jeong and Michael Patrick Bell, who reprise their roles of Kim Ly and White Shadow, the cast features all new members. One of the reasons for this was the desire to have the actors working together. "The thing is that these actors are really busy, and we want to get talent in the same room at the same time to get that chemistry. And that's a lot easier to do with professional voice actors," said DreamWorks Animation head of television Margie Cohn. The cast was selected by the Titmouse's casting and voice director Andrea Romano, who chose people Titmouse already knew and had worked with.

Reid Scott, who replaced Ryan Reynolds as the voice of Turbo, knew Prynoski from 2000 or 2001, when they worked together on a Flash Frame pilot for AMC. After that, they lost contact, but they met again ten years later, when Scott successfully auditioned for Disney XD's Motorcity, which Prynoski created and directed. They enjoyed working together, and when Motorcity got canceled, Prynoski offered him the role in recently contracted Turbo series. Scott's initial approach to the role tried to capture Reynold's "inflection, his intonation and the character's attitude. And then slowly it took on a life of its own. The Turbo we have now is inspired by that, but he's very much his own guy." According to Scott, the same happened to all other characters, which "slowly morphed into different versions." Beside Ken Jeong and Michael Patrick Bell, who reprise their roles of Kim-Ly and White Shadow from the film, the series features an all-new cast. It consists of Reid Scott as Turbo, John Eric Bentley as Whiplash, Grey DeLisle-Griffin as Burn, Phil LaMarr as Smoove Move, Amir Talai as Skidmark and Tito, and Eric Bauza as Chet and Guy Gagné.

== Awards and nominations ==
Year	Award	Category	Nominee	Result
2014	Daytime Emmy Award	Outstanding Children's Animated Program	Chris Prynoski, Jack Thomas, Ben Kalina, Shannon Barrett Prynoski, Jennifer Ray	Nominated
2014	Daytime Emmy Award	Outstanding Sound Mixing – Animation	Konrad Piñon	Nominated
2015	Annie Award	Outstanding Achievement, Production Design in an Animated TV/Broadcast Production	Antonio Canobbio, Khang Le, Mark Taihei, Howard Chen & Brandon Cuellar	Nominated
2015	Annie Award	Outstanding Achievement, Editorial in an Animated TV/Broadcast Production	Todd Raleigh & Doug Vito	Nominated
2016	Annie Award	Outstanding Achievement, Character Animation in an Animated Television/Broadcast Production	Ryan MacNeil	Nominated
2016	Daytime Emmy Awards	Outstanding Performer in an Animated Program	Reid Scott	Nominated
2016	Daytime Emmy Awards	Outstanding Original Song	"We're Gonna Space Die"	Nominated

== Home media ==
A DVD collection of all the season 1 episodes, titled Turbo Fast: Season 1 was released on DVD on June 2, 2015, by 20th Century Fox Home Entertainment.
