= David Soren =

David Soren may refer to:

- David Soren (animator) (born 1973), Canadian animator
- David Soren (archaeologist) (born 1946), American archaeologist
