= Be Our Guest (American Horror Story) =

- American Horror Story episode
- Episode no.: Season 5 Episode 12
- Directed by: Bradley Buecker
- Written by: John J. Gray
- Production code: 5ATS12
- Original air date: January 13, 2016
- Running time: 50 minutes

Guest appearances
- Finn Wittrock as Tristan Duffy; Mare Winningham as Hazel Evers; Lily Rabe as Aileen Wuornos; Christine Estabrook as Marcy; John Carroll Lynch as John Wayne Gacy; Seth Gabel as Jeffrey Dahmer; Anthony Ruivivar as Richard Ramirez; Helena Mattsson as Agnetha; Kamilla Alnes as Vendela; Josh Braaten as Douglas Pryor; Shree Crooks as Scarlett Lowe; Nicole Tompkins as 17 years old Scarlett; Alanna Ubach as Jo; Lennon Henry as Holden Lowe; Jessica Lu as Bronwyn; Charles Melton as Mr. Wu; Amir Talai as Mitch

Episode chronology
← Previous "Battle Royale"	Next → "Chapter 1"
- American Horror Story: Hotel

"Be Our Guest" is the twelfth and final episode of the fifth season of the anthology television series American Horror Story. It aired on January 13, 2016, on the cable network FX. This episode was written by John J. Gray and directed by Bradley Buecker.

== Plot ==
One year after the incidents in "Battle Royale", Liz Taylor reflects on the renovated Hotel Cortez. Their first guests are a couple who like the rooms, however, Sally and Will Drake kill them. Liz and Iris urge the ghosts to stop the murders, but Sally and Will decline. James March intervenes and orders them to end it, as the repeated disappearances of tenants will eventually result in the hotel being demolished and the ghosts all losing their home. Iris finds a miserable Sally and gifts her a smartphone. Sally gets addicted to social media and becomes happier.

Liz asks Will to start designing again, while she runs Will's companies as his representative, creating the idea of Will being a reclusive designer to attract more attention to his designs as well as to cover up the fact that he cannot leave the hotel due to him being a ghost. The hotel becomes widely popular thanks to Will's designs and Sally's advertising of the hotel on her social media. However, Liz still cannot find happiness in her success, so Iris invites Billie Dean Howard to communicate with Liz's dead lover, Tristan. Tristan does not respond, making Liz think that he still blames her for his death. Instead, Donovan communicates through Billie Dean and reaffirms his love for Iris and states that he is in a better place.

Liz attends the birth of her granddaughter, but then learns that she has terminal prostate cancer. Ramona offers to turn Liz, but she declines as she does not want to have to kill in order to survive. Liz instead asks the ghosts, her surrogate family, to kill her so that she can become a ghost and live forever with them. Due to them growing fond of Liz, none of the ghosts are willing to harm her, until the Countess appears and decides to be the one to kill Liz in order to help her transition one last time. She slits Liz's throat while the ghosts watch. Tristan then visits Liz's ghost, revealing that he deliberately avoided Liz when she was alive in order to convince her to continue living, but now they can be together for all eternity.

Iris and Ramona later grow annoyed with Billie Dean's constant incursions to the hotel in order to film her psychic medium shows as it will attract bad business to the hotel. The ghost of John arrives for March's annual Devil's Night party and decides to tell Billie Dean his story, revealing that he and his family decide to leave the city and start a new life elsewhere, only for John to be killed by police outside the hotel, preventing him from permanently staying in the hotel. John then invites Billie Dean to the Devil's Night party, where the ghosts of the serial killers all threaten to kill her if she does not leave the hotel and never returns, which she refuses to do as she knows the ghosts can't leave the hotel. Ramona arrives and states that she will hunt down and kill Billie Dean herself if she does not leave. Billie Dean eventually flees the hotel, never to return. John leaves the party to welcome Scarlett, who visits for a few hours every Devil's Night. Together they share family time in the hotel. The final scene is with the Countess who flirts and seduces a male guest in the hotel ballroom.

== Reception ==
"Be Our Guest" was watched by 2.24 million people during its original broadcast, and gained a 1.1 ratings share among adults aged 18–49. It also ranked second in the Nielsen Social ratings, with 65,000 tweets seen by over 1.04 million people.

The episode received mixed to positive reviews, earning a 63% approval rating based on 16 reviews, with an average score of 6.4/10, on review aggregator Rotten Tomatoes. There is no critical consensus on the site as of May 2020. E.A. Hanks of The New York Times declared that the season "was populated with plots that went nowhere...as well as plots that were set up and resolved with minimal interest". However, the reporter contends that Denis O'Hare as Liz was the series' high note.
