= Campus Ladies =

2006 American TV series

- Created by: Carrie Aizley; Christen Sussin
- Starring: Christen Sussin; Carrie Aizley; Derek Carter; Jonah Hill; Miranda Kent; Amir Talai
- Opening theme: "Little MissFit" by Static
- Country of origin: United States
- Original language: English
- No. of seasons: 2
- No. of episodes: 20

Production
- Producers: Cheryl Hines; Peter Principato; Paul Young
- Camera setup: Single-camera
- Running time: 30 minutes
- Production company: Principato-Young Entertainment

Original release
- Network: Oxygen
- Release: January 8, 2006 – February 2, 2007

Campus Ladies is an American sitcom that premiered on Oxygen on January 8, 2006. It stars Christen Sussin and Carrie Aizley as two 40-something women who decide to go enroll at the fictional University of the Midwest. The humor comes from the various situations in which the "ladies" get involved while trying to fit in with their much younger friends and classmates.

== Premise ==
The shopping trip of recent widow Joan Beamin and married Barri Martin, lifelong friends and both apparently childless, is cut short when Barri wastes a drink on her skirt. When they go to Barri's house for her to change, they find her husband Roger having an affair in their bedroom. The ladies end up in a bar and observe a group of students from the local university, and ultimately decide to enroll.

Once at UMW, the ladies meet Drew and Abdul, two of their classmates who will be living in the room next to them. Drew is tall and blond and believes himself to be a ladies' man, but in actuality, is far from that. Abdul is an Iranian young man who refers to everyone as "Mister" and "Miss". The ladies also meet their roommate, a young woman named Paige, who is, at first, not thrilled to be sharing a room with Joan and Barri. Also, Guy is the dorm's resident advisor.

From then on, the ladies embark on the adventures of college life, complete with one-night stands, sexual experimentation, research papers, and football games.

The majority of the show's dialogue is improvised, as most of the actors were members or alumni of the Groundlings comedy troupe.

== Cast ==
=== Main ===
- Christen Sussin as Barri Martin
- Carrie Aizley as Joan Beamin
- Derek Carter as Drew Penniger
- Jonah Hill as Guy Ferguson (season one)
- Miranda Kent as Paige Hollister
- Amir Talai as Abdul

=== Recurring ===
- Danielle Weeks as Phoebe
- Natalie Garza as Faith and Nicole Garza as Harley
- Jessica Radloff as Marni

=== Guest and cameo appearances ===
- Jane Kaczmarek appeared in the pilot as Joan and Barri's friend.
- Will Forte and Anthony Anderson appeared in "Night of the Condom" and "My First Orgasm" as Stuart and James, two graduate students with whom Joan and Barri developed on-again-off-again relationships.
- Maya Rudolph appeared in "All Nighter" as Teresa Winslow Fabré, the ladies' tough professor
- Dan Castellaneta appeared in "No Means No" and "Safety Bathroom" as the dean of the university.
- Paul Reubens appeared in "Drama Class" as the drama instructor.
- Fred Willard appeared in "Spring Break" as a doctor.
- Jason Alexander appeared as a geography professor in "A Very Special Episode" (Dec. 5, 2006; he also directed this episode)
- Mo'Nique appeared as a professor in the "Black Sorority" episode.
- Sean Hayes appeared in "Foreign Policy" and "A Very Special Episode".
- Janeane Garofalo appeared in "The Blind Leading the Blonde" (Dec 19, 2006).
- Di Quon appeared in "Foreign Policy" as Yun, the ladies' tutor
- Brian Drolet appeared in "My First Orgasm" as College Student.

=== Recasts ===
- Both Jerry Lambert (in the pilot) and Ian Gomez (in "Spring Break") have appeared as Roger Martin, Barri's ex-husband. Kevin Nealon also shot scenes as Roger Martin that were to be used in the pilot, but were ultimately scrapped.

== Cancellation ==
The show was confirmed cancelled by Amir Talai on a MySpace fan page. The comment said: "I regret to inform you that Campus Ladies has been cancelled. Thank you from the bottom of our hearts for your support. The show was the most fun I've ever had on a set, and I made some life-long friends there. Be on the lookout for the DVDs at some point. Lots of love to all the shows fans."

== Episodes ==
=== Series overview ===
Season	Episodes	Originally released	
Season	Episodes	First released	Last released
1	10	January 8, 2006	April 9, 2006
2	10	December 5, 2006	February 6, 2007

=== Season 1 (2006) ===
No. overall	No. in season	Title	Directed by	Written by	Original release date
1	1	"Pilot"	David Steinberg	Story by : Carrie Aizley & Christen Sussin	January 8, 2006
After witnessing her husband having an affair in their bedroom, Barri and her widowed friend Joan decide to drown their sorrows at a local bar. At the bar, they observe a group of college students having fun at a nearby table. Lamenting about the good times they'd missed, they decide to enroll at the University of the Midwest. On moving day, the girls meet Abdul and Drew, their nextdoor neighbors; Paige Hollister, their teenaged roommate; and Guy Ferguson, the dorm's resident advisor. Abdul and Drew quickly befriend the ladies, as does Guy. Paige, however, is less than enchanted at the prospect of sharing her dorm room with a couple of "1993-looking bird-people." Guest star: Jane Kaczmarek
2	2	"Night of the Condom"	Sean Lambert	Story by : Carrie Aizley & Christen Sussin & Paul Young	January 8, 2006
Guest stars: Will Forte, Anthony Anderson
3	3	"Lesbian Lovers"	Sean Lambert	Story by : Carrie Aizley & Christen Sussin & Paul Young	January 15, 2006
4	4	"All Nighter"	David Steinberg	Story by : Carrie Aizley & Christen Sussin & Paul Young	January 22, 2006
Guest star: Maya Rudolph
5	5	"No Means No"	Unknown	Unknown	January 29, 2006
6	6	"My First Orgasm"	Unknown	Unknown	March 12, 2006
7	7	"Safety Bathroom"	Unknown	Unknown	March 19, 2006
8	8	"Drama Class"	Unknown	Unknown	March 26, 2006
9	9	"Fraternity Row"	Unknown	Unknown	April 2, 2006
10	10	"Spring Break"	Unknown	Unknown	April 9, 2006

=== Season 2 (2006–07) ===
No. overall	No. in season	Title	Directed by	Written by	Original release date
11	1	"The Dare"	Sean Lambert	Unknown	December 5, 2006
12	2	"A Very Special Episode"	Unknown	Unknown	December 5, 2006
13	3	"Webcam"	Unknown	Unknown	December 12, 2006
14	4	"The Blind Leading the Blonde"	Unknown	Unknown	December 19, 2006
15	5	"Black Sorority"	Dan O'Connor	Unknown	January 2, 2007
16	6	"Psych 101"	Unknown	Unknown	January 9, 2007
17	7	"Safety First"	Unknown	Unknown	January 16, 2007
18	8	"The Last Supper"	Unknown	Unknown	January 23, 2007
19	9	"We Are Family"	Unknown	Unknown	January 30, 2007
20	10	"Foreign Exchange"	Unknown	Unknown	February 6, 2007
