= David Ian Salter =

American film editor

- Born: Boston, Massachusetts, United States
- Occupation: Film editor

David Ian Salter is an American film editor whose credits include Toy Story 2 (1999), Finding Nemo (2003), Ice Age: Continental Drift (2012), The SpongeBob Movie: Sponge Out of Water (2015), and The Addams Family (2019).

Salter has been elected to membership of the American Cinema Editors and the Academy of Motion Picture Arts and Sciences.

== Filmography ==
=== As an editor ===
Year	Title	Notes
1999	Toy Story 2	Edited with Edie Bleiman and Lee Unkrich
2003	Finding Nemo	
2012	Ice Age: Continental Drift	Edited with James M. Palumbo
2015	The SpongeBob Movie: Sponge Out of Water	
2019	The Addams Family	
2023	Under the Boardwalk	
