= Amir Talai =

American actor and singer (born 1977)

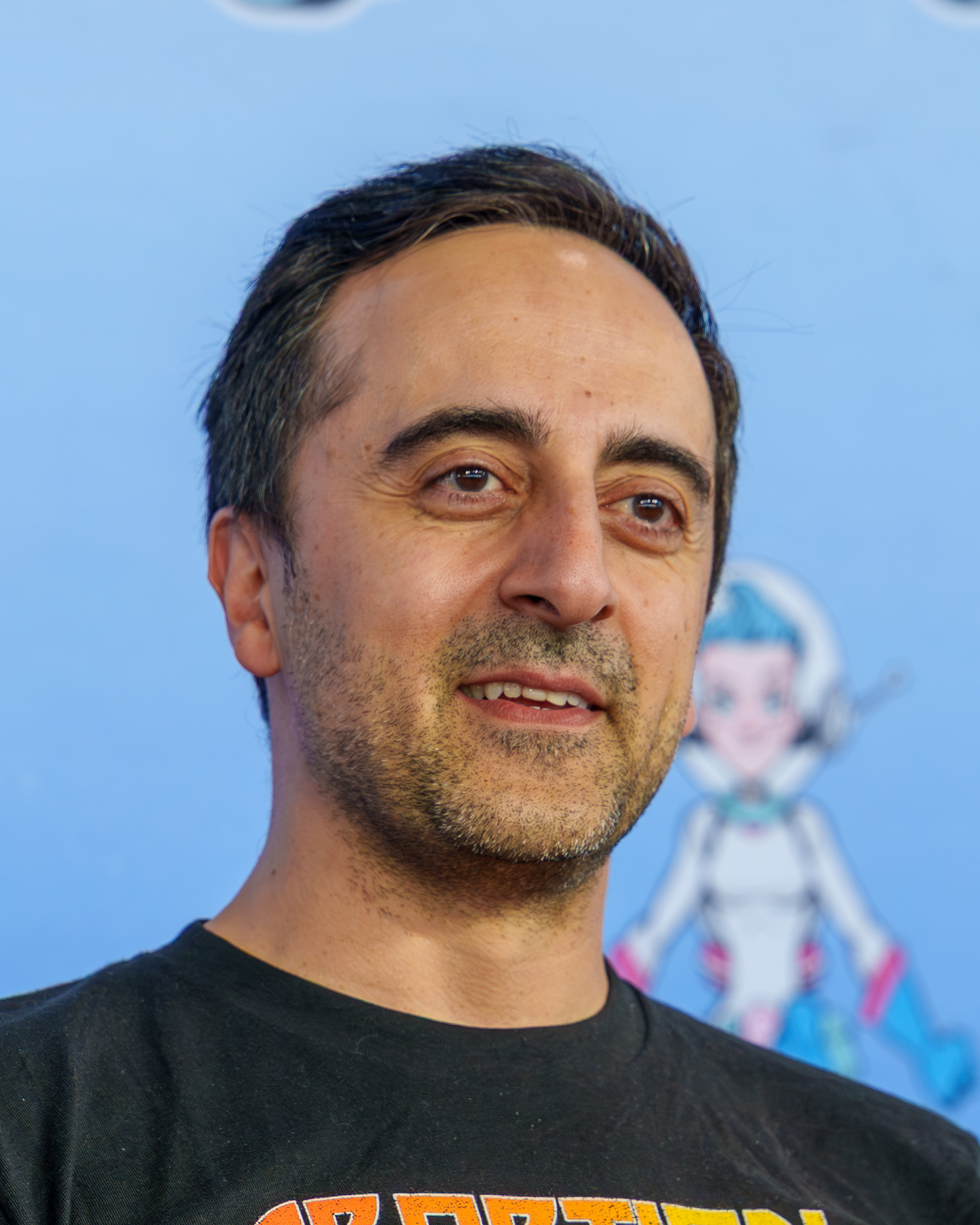
- Talai at GalaxyCon Nashville in 2026
- Born: June 24, 1977 (age 49); San Francisco, California, United States
- Education: University of California, Berkeley
- Occupations: Actor, singer
- Years active: 2001–present
- Spouse: Nina Manni (m. 2011)

Amir Talai (born June 24, 1977) is an American actor. He is best known for voicing Alastor in the Amazon Prime Video adult animated musical series Hazbin Hotel (2024–2025). He also voiced Crane in the Nickelodeon animated comedy series Kung Fu Panda: Legends of Awesomeness (2011–2016), and Skidmark in the Netflix animated comedy adventure series Turbo Fast (2013–2016). Talai appeared in numerous television series, including portraying Abdul in the Oxygen sitcom series Campus Ladies (2006–2007), Cyrus in the CBS comedy-drama series The Ex List, and Alan in the Fox sitcom series LA to Vegas (2018). He also portrayed Raza Syed in 2008 comedy film Harold & Kumar Escape from Guantanamo Bay, Wendell in the 2011 teen comedy television film Best Player, Patel in 2012 romantic comedy film What to Expect When You're Expecting, Rami in the 2018 crime drama film A Patient Man, and Bill Morley in the 2024 family comedy film The Present. Talai is also a musical theatre performer.

== Early life and education ==
Talai was born on June 24, 1977, in San Francisco, California, United States, as a child of Persian immigrants from Iran. He grew up in a Muslim family. He was involved in theatre in middle and high school. He graduated from the University of California, Berkeley, with a degree in mass communications, with a minor in dramatic arts. After graduation, he moved to West Hollywood, California.

== Career ==
Talai is an actor with numerous credits, mostly in episodic roles. He had several recurring roles including as Abdul in the Oxygen sitcom series Campus Ladies (2006–2007), Cyrus in the CBS comedy-drama series The Ex List, and Alan in the Fox sitcom series LA to Vegas (2018). He also appeared in series such as American Horror Story (2016), Bosch (2016, 2020), The Shrink Next Door (2021), Ghosts (2022), and High Potential (2025). Talai portrayed Raza Syed in 2008 comedy film Harold & Kumar Escape from Guantanamo Bay, Wendell in the 2011 teen comedy television film Best Player, Patel in 2012 romantic comedy film What to Expect When You're Expecting, Rami in the 2018 crime drama film A Patient Man, and Bill Morley in the 2024 family comedy film The Present. He also plays Haled in the upcoming 2026 independent romantic comedy film Go-Love-Go.

He is best known for portraying Alastor the Radio Demon, one of the main characters in Hazbin Hotel which has aired on Amazon Prime Video since 2024. His other main roles include Crane in the Nickelodeon animated comedy series Kung Fu Panda: Legends of Awesomeness (2011–2016), and Skidmarks in the Netflix animated comedy adventure series Turbo Fast (2013–2016). He also voiced numerous episodic and background characters in the adult animated comedy series Family Guy (2005, 2016, 2023–2025) and American Dad! (2008–2014, 2020–2026).

Talai also performs in the musical theater, including portraying Bert Healy in the 2018 rendition of Annie at the Hollywood Bowl, directed by Michael Arden. In 2024, he also performed songs of Alastor from Hazbin Hotel at the Majestic Theatre in New York City. Additionally, the 2024 electro swing pop song "Stayed Gone", which he performed for Hazbin Hotel together with Christian Borle, was listed on the US Billboard Bubbling Under Hot 100, peaking at number eleven.

Talai was also a board member of the Los Angeles division of the SAG-AFTRA labor union. He also advocates for representation of marginalized artists and performers in media and has written articles related to the matter in publications such as BuzzFeed and Vulture.

== Personal life ==
Talai has a wife, and lives in West Hollywood in California, United States.

== Filmography ==
=== Film ===
| Year | Title | Role | Notes | Ref. |
|---|---|---|---|---|
| 2002 | Hum | Simon Gould | Feature film | |
| 2002 | Plugged In | Foreign caller | Short film | |
| 2003 | Legally Blonde 2: Red, White & Blonde | Associate | Feature film | |
| 2004 | Adventures in Homeschooling | Baliotis | Short film | |
| 2004 | The Florist | Masood | Short film | |
| 2004 | Homeland Security | Babir Alkazar | Television film; uncredited | |
| 2004 | Jihad | Mohammad | Short film | |
| 2004 | November | George | Feature film | |
| 2004 | One Night Stand Up | Mahesh Suresh | Short film | |
| 2005 | Fractalus | Lee | Short film | |
| 2006 | Fighting Words | Ralph | Feature film | |
| 2006 | More, Patience | Hypochondriac | Television movie | |
| 2006 | The Pursuit of Happyness | Clerk | Feature film | |
| 2008 | Harold & Kumar Escape from Guantanamo Bay | Raza Syed | Feature film | |
| 2008 | The Onion Movie | Ahman | Feature film | |
| 2009 | Don't Ruin American Healthcare | Kevin | Short film | |
| 2009 | Guys and Dolls at the Hollywood Bowl | Angie the Ox | Short film | |
| 2009 | Guys and Dolls at the Hollywood Bowl | Joey Biltmore | Short film | |
| 2011 | Being Bin Laden | Omar | Short film | |
| 2011 | Best Player | Wendell | Television film | |
| 2011 | Johnny Bravo Goes to Bollywood | Ahmet | Television film; voice | |
| 2011 | Johnny Bravo Goes to Bollywood | Voodoo Guru | Television film; voice | |
| 2011 | Johnny Bravo Goes to Bollywood | Thug #2 | Television film; voice | |
| 2011 | Me, Inc. | Kevin | Short film | |
| 2012 | Love, Sex and Missed Connections | Ted | Feature film | |
| 2012 | What to Expect When You're Expecting | Patel | Feature film | |
| 2013 | Hummingbird | Kevin | Feature film; uncredited | |
| 2013 | Inequality for All | —N/a | Documentary film; special thanks | |
| 2014 | 10 Cent Pistol | Amir | Feature film | |
| 2014 | Petunia P.I. | Rambo Borigald | Television film | |
| 2014 | Ricky Robot Arms | Mike | Short film | |
| 2015 | Down Dog | Matt Jobrani | Short film | |
| 2015 | Grandma | Omid | Feature film | |
| 2015 | The King of 7B | Darren | Television film | |
| 2015 | Marvin | Mr. Donaldson | Short film | |
| 2016 | Diani & Devine Meet the Apocalypse | Fahreed | Feature film | |
| 2016 | How to Survive a Breakup | Amir | Short film | |
| 2016 | This is Now | Daniel | Feature film | |
| 2017 | The Circle | Matt | Feature film | |
| 2017 | Killing Gunther | Izzat | Feature film | |
| 2018 | Don't Worry, He Won't Get Far on Foot | Night shift physician | Feature film; uncredited | |
| 2018 | The First Lady | Amir | Short film; also screenwriter | |
| 2018 | Stuck | Mo | Feature film | |
| 2019 | Marriage Story | Amir | Feature film | |
| 2019 | A Patient Man | Rami | Feature film | |
| 2019 | Stay Home | Dario | Short film | |
| 2022 | The Present | Bill Morley | Feature film | |
| 2026 | Go-Love-Go | Haled | Feature film; upcoming | |

=== Television ===
| Year | Title | Role | Notes | Ref. |
|---|---|---|---|---|
| 2001 | Absolute Zero | Thom Yorke | Episode: "Radiohead" | |
| 2001 | Nash Bridges | Khalid Dib | Episode: "Fair Game" | |
| 2002 | Mad TV | Indian person | Episode no. 175 | |
| 2003 | 10-8: Officers on Duty | Gang member | Episode: "Late for School" | |
| 2003–2004 | The Tonight Show with Jay Leno | Various characters | | |
| 2004 | Jimmy Kimmel Live! | Iraqi Simon Cowell | Episode aired on March 17, 2004 | |
| 2004 | NCIS | Simi | Episode: "Reveille" | |
| 2004 | Nip/Tuck | Dr. Hamir Gindi | Episode: "Mrs. Grubman" | |
| 2005 | Gilmore Girls | Patel Chandrasekhar | 2 episodes | |
| 2005 | The Comeback | Greg Narayan | 2 episodes | |
| 2005 | Curb Your Enthusiasm | Waiter | Episode: "The Bowtie" | |
| 2005 | Cold Case | Malvinder Khatani (1999, 2005) | Episode: "Start-Up" | |
| 2005 | Love, Inc. | Patrick | 2 episodes | |
| 2005 | Family Guy | Hindu person | Voice; episode: "The Father, the Son, and the Holy Fonz" | |
| 2005 | Family Guy | Priest | Voice; episode: "The Father, the Son, and the Holy Fonz" | |
| 2006 | The Minor Accomplishments of Jackie Woodman | Kai | Episode: "Turning Manure Into Soy" | |
| 2006 | Studio 60 on the Sunset Strip | Fred | 2 episode | |
| 2006 | Hannah Montana | Sanjay | Episode: "Debt It Be" | |
| 2006–2007 | Campus Ladies | Abdul | 20 episodes | |
| 2007 | The Winner | Richard | 5 episodes | |
| 2008 | American Dad! | The Snake | Voice; episode: "Phantom of the Telethon" | |
| 2008 | The Ex List | Cyrus | 13 episodes | |
| 2008 | Hollywood Residential | Tom Scully | Voice; episode: "Where's Tom?"; uncredited | |
| 2009 | American Dad! | Sanjay Bhudapar | Voice; episode: "Jack's Back" | |
| 2009 | American Dad! | Achmed | Voice; episode: "Wife Insurance" | |
| 2009 | American Dad! | Crowd member | Voice; episode: "Wife Insurance" | |
| 2009 | How I Met Your Mother | Richard Greenleaf | Episode: "As Fast as She Can" | |
| 2009 | Wizards of Waverly Place | Alien | Episode: "Wizard for a Day" | |
| 2010 | American Dad! | Trace | Voice; episode: "Son of Stan" | |
| 2010 | American Dad! | John Leguizamo | Voice; episode: "Son of Stan" | |
| 2010 | American Dad! | Myeeah | Voice; episode: "Son of Stan" | |
| 2010 | Zeke and Luther | Dex Bratner | Episode: "A Very Hairy Problem" | |
| 2010 | Modern Family | Dale | Episode: "Halloween" | |
| 2010 | Svetlana | Farhad Golastani | Episode: "Ointment" | |
| 2011 | American Dad! | Michael | Voice; episode: "The Worst Stan" | |
| 2011 | American Dad! | Ross's employee | Voice; episode: "The Worst Stan" | |
| 2011 | American Dad! | Ricky Martin | Voice; episode: "The Worst Stan" | |
| 2011 | Fanboy & Chum Chum | Brizwald Harmounian | Voice; episode: "Risky Brizness" | |
| 2011 | I'm in the Band | Avi Patel | Episode: "Iron Weasel: The Video Game" | |
| 2011 | Kung Fu Panda: Legends of Awesomeness | Male goose | Voice; episode: "Bad Po" | |
| 2011 | The Paul Reiser Show | Amir | Episode: "The Old Guy" | |
| 2011 | Love Bites | Aram | Episode: "Boys to Men" | |
| 2011–2016 | Kung Fu Panda: Legends of Awesomeness | Crane | Main role; voice; 61 episodes | |
| 2012 | Castle | Sam Spear | Episode: "Swan Song" | |
| 2012 | Guys with Kids | Gabe | Episode: "Thanksgiving" | |
| 2012 | Kung Fu Panda: Legends of Awesomeness | Rickshaw driver | Voice; episode: "The Most Dangerous Po" | |
| 2012 | Kung Fu Panda: Legends of Awesomeness | Pig boy | Voice; episode: "Enter the Dragon" | |
| 2012 | Kung Fu Panda: Legends of Awesomeness | Goose #1 | Voice; episode: "Enter the Dragon" | |
| 2012 | Partners | Buck | 2 episodes | |
| 2012 | Touch | Sami | Episode: "Entanglement" | |
| 2012, 2023–2026 | American Dad! | Additional voices | Voice; 3 episodes | |
| 2013 | 2 Broke Girls | Amir | Episode: "And the Psychic Shakedown" | |
| 2013 | A-Holes Anonymous | Pete | Webseries; episode: "Fearless and Moral Sexual Inventory" | |
| 2013 | American Dad! | Scientist | Voice; episode: "Da Flippity Flop" | |
| 2013 | Coogan Auto | VIP | Webseries; 5 episodes | |
| 2013 | Don't Trust the B— in Apartment 23 | Mitchell | Episode: "Mean Girls…" | |
| 2013 | Devious Maids | Jace | Episode: "Pilot"; uncredited | |
| 2013 | Kung Fu Panda: Legends of Awesomeness | Fake Tai Lung | Voice; episode: "The Maltese Mantis" | |
| 2013 | Kung Fu Panda: Legends of Awesomeness | Child villager | Voice; episode: "The Midnight Stranger" | |
| 2013 | Kung Fu Panda: Legends of Awesomeness | Villager | Voice; episode: "Qilin Time" | |
| 2013 | Kung Fu Panda: Legends of Awesomeness | Goat villager | Voice; episode: "Mind Over Manners" | |
| 2013 | Kung Fu Panda: Legends of Awesomeness | Goat child | Voice; episode: "Serpent's Tooth" | |
| 2013 | Major Crimes | Geoff Klein | Episode: "All In" | |
| 2013 | Turbo Fast | Beetle minion #1 | Voice; episode: "Crazy Fast" | |
| 2013 | Turbo Fast | The Stinkers cricket | Voice; episode: "Dungball Derby" | |
| 2013 | Turbo Fast | Starlight Plaza snail | Voice; episode: "Bumperdome" | |
| 2013 | Turbo Fast | Fire ants | Voice; episode: "Ants Ants Revolution" | |
| 2013 | When the Bomb Drops | Bill | | |
| 2013–2016 | Turbo Fast | Skidmark | Main role; voice; 51 episodes | |
| 2013–2016 | Turbo Fast | Tito Lopez | Recurring role; voice; 17 episodes | |
| 2014 | About a Boy | Orlando | Episode: "About a Birthday Party" | |
| 2014 | Agents of S.H.I.E.L.D. | Schneider | Episode: "Hen in the Wolf House" | |
| 2014 | American Dad! | Paramedic | Voice; episode: "Buck, Wild" | |
| 2014 | American Dad! | Josh | Voice; episode: "Big Stan on Campus" | |
| 2014 | Kung Fu Panda: Legends of Awesomeness | Male villager | Voice; episode: "The Goosefather" | |
| 2014 | Kung Fu Panda: Legends of Awesomeness | Goat | Voice; episode: "Croc You Like a Hurricane" | |
| 2014 | Kung Fu Panda: Legends of Awesomeness | Villager #2 | Voice; episode: "Croc You Like a Hurricane" | |
| 2014 | What's Next for Sarah? | Jason | Webseries; 2 episodes | |
| 2014 | Turbo Fast | Angry snail | Voice; episode: "Tale of Two Turbos" | |
| 2014 | Turbo Fast | Tour guide | Voice; episode: "Hardcase Returns" | |
| 2014 | Turbo Fast | Tomato-covered snail | Voice; episode: "Breakneck's Back" | |
| 2015 | 20 Seconds to Live | Man | Episode: "Evil Doll" | |
| 2015 | Bones | Hamid Vaziri | Episode: "The Murder in the Middle East" | |
| 2015 | Love Handles | Amir | Episode: "Put Your Tail Down" | |
| 2016 | American Horror Story | Mitch | Episode: "Be Our Guest" | |
| 2016 | Family Guy | Indian child | Voice; episode: "Road to India" | |
| 2016 | Family Guy | Indian man | Voice; episode: "Road to India" | |
| 2016 | Fresh Off the Boat | Frank | Episode: "Hi, My Name Is…" | |
| 2016 | History of the World... For Now | Financial reporter | Episode: "All About the Benjamins" | |
| 2016 | History of the World... For Now | Pardoner | Episode: "Staying Alive" | |
| 2016 | Turbo Fast | Spencer | 2 episodes | |
| 2016 | Turbo Fast | Librarian snail | Voice; episode: "The Story of J.J.E.F.F." | |
| 2016 | Turbo Fast | Sam | Voice; episode: "Turbo Does Laundry: Part 2" | |
| 2016 | Turbo Fast | Harkentrousers | Voice; episode: "Turbo Does Laundry: Part 2" | |
| 2016 | Turbo Fast | Crazylegs O'Bernstein | Voice; episode: "Turbo Does Laundry: Part 2" | |
| 2016 | World Changers | Himself (segment host) | Talkshow | |
| 2016, 2020 | Bosch | John Klein | 3 episodes | |
| 2017 | I'm Sorry | Maz | Episode: "Ass Cubes" | |
| 2017 | See Ya | Rami | Episode: "Family Yard Sale" | |
| 2017 | Scorpion | Vadat | Episode: "Sci Hard" | |
| 2018 | Adam Ruins Everything | Himself (guest) | 3 episodes | |
| 2018 | Here and Now | Maz Nuri | Episode: "Wake" | |
| 2018 | LA to Vegas | Alan | Recurring role; 13 episodes | |
| 2018 | The News Tank | Ashir July | Episode: "Rogue Rental Goats & Cookie Sized Nuggets!" | |
| 2018 | Noches con Platanito | Himself (guest) | Talkshow; episode: "Amir Talai/Olivia Macklin/Alejandra Said/Salvador Espada/Los Rodriguez de Sinaloa" | |
| 2019 | Amphibia | Additional voices | Voice; 2 episodes | |
| 2019 | The Lion Guard | Tupp | Voice; episode: "Journey of Memories" | |
| 2019 | People Just Do Nothing | Farouk | Episode: "Pilot"; not released | |
| 2019 | Prince of Peoria | Professor Limpus | Episode: "Teddy the Human Cannonball" | |
| 2020 | American Dad! | Trophy store customer | Voice; episode: "Trophy Wife, Trophy Life" | |
| 2020 | Bridge to Broadway | Himself (guest) | Talkwhow; episode: "Amir Talai" | |
| 2020 | Into the Dark | Amir | Episode: "Pooka Lives!" | |
| 2020 | Outmatched | Cedric | Episode: "Black Mold" | |
| 2020 | Science Praid | Stevie Christopher | Voice; 2 episodes | |
| 2020 | Where's Waldo? | Ajay | Voice; episode: "Mumbai Dance Party" | |
| 2020 | Where's Waldo? | Guy | Voice; episode: "Uh-Oh, Canada" | |
| 2021 | American Dad! | Employee | Voice; episode: "Dancin' A-With My Cell" | |
| 2021 | Puppy Place | Maz | Episode: "Pugsley" | |
| 2021 | The Shrink Next Door | Joe | 3 episodes | |
| 2021–2022 | The Rigmarole | Improvisor | 4 episodes; also screenwriter | |
| 2022 | American Dad! | Cultist | Voice; episode: "The Curious Case of the Old Hole" | |
| 2022 | American Dad! | Truck packer | Voice; episode: "The Curious Case of the Old Hole" | |
| 2022 | Ghosts | Director Daniel | Episode: "Dumb Deaths" | |
| 2022 | Tuca & Bertie | Additional voices | 2 episodes | |
| 2022 | We Baby Bears | Brad | Voice; episode: "Baba Yaga House" | |
| 2022 | We Baby Bears | Chad | Voice; episode: "Baba Yaga House" | |
| 2022 | We Baby Bears | Snake attendant | Voice; episode: "Big Trouble Little Babies" | |
| 2022 | We Baby Bears | Vampire attendant | Voice; episode: "Big Trouble Little Babies" | |
| 2023 | American Dad! | Colby | Voice; episode: "A Little Mystery" | |
| 2023 | American Dad! | Scotty | Voice; episode: "A Little Extra Scratch" | |
| 2023 | Family Guy | Nerd | Voice; episode: "White Meg Can't Jump" | |
| 2023 | My Dad the Bounty Hunter | EHC booking officer | Voice; episode: "Jailbreak" | |
| 2023 | My Dad the Bounty Hunter | Boarfish boy | Voice; episode: "Ocanom Grind" | |
| 2023 | My Dad the Bounty Hunter | Robot dealer | Voice; episode: "Ocanom Grind" | |
| 2023 | My Dad the Bounty Hunter | Snooty cashier | Voice; episode: "Ocanom Grind" | |
| 2023–2024 | Hailey's On It! | Uncle Naveed | Voice; episode: "Splatter of the Bands" | |
| 2023–2024 | Hailey's On It! | Terry Kline | Voice; episode: "Lady and the Trampoline" | |
| 2023–2024 | Hailey's On It! | Vice Principal Bacon | Voice; episode: "Student of the Weak" | |
| 2023, 2025 | Family Guy | Additional voices | Voice; 2 episodes | |
| 2024 | Meet the Biz | Himself (guest) | Talkshow; episode: "Amir Talai – 'Luck'" | |
| 2024 | Sausage Party: Foodtopia | Background voices | Voice; 8 episodes | |
| 2024–2025 | Hazbin Hotel | Alastor the Radio Demon | Main role; voice; 12 episodes | |
| 2024–2025 | Hazbin Hotel | Tom Trench | Recurring role; voice; 5 episodes | |
| 2025 | Family Guy | Illusionist | Voice; episode: "The Chicken or the Meg" | |
| 2025 | High Potential | Mark Wilson | Episode: "Chutes and Murders" | |
| 2025 | Krapopolis | Timon | Voice; episode: "Don Tyxote" | |
| 2025 | Krapopolis | Additional voices | Voice; episode: "Nike (The Goddness)" | |
| 2025 | Wizards Beyond Waverly Place | Alistair Goodspeed | Episode: "Potions Eleven" | |

=== Video games ===
| Year | Title | Role | Notes |
|---|---|---|---|
| 2001 | The Sims: Hot Date | Sims | Voice |
| 2006 | Full Spectrum Warrior: Ten Hammers | Additional voices | Voice |
| 2006 | Titan Quest | Additional voices | Voice |
| 2006 | Company of Heroes | Additional voices | Voice |
| 2006 | Splinter Cell: Double Agent | Additional characters | Voice |
| 2006 | The Sopranos: Road to Respect | Additional voices | Voice |
| 2007 | Titan Quest: Immortal Throne | Additional voices | Voice |
| 2011 | Assassin's Creed: Revelations | Bodyguard serving with Abbas | Voice |
| 2011 | Assassin's Creed: Revelations | Abbas's captain | Voice |
| 2011 | Assassin's Creed: Revelations | Masyaf Assassins | Voice |
| 2011 | Kung Fu Panda 2 | Crane | Voice |
| 2012 | Assassin's Creed III: Liberation | Additional voices | Voice |
| 2014 | Far Cry 4 | Additional voices | Voice |
| 2015 | Kung Fu Panda: Showdown of Legendary Legends | Crane | Voice |
| 2015 | Kung Fu Panda: Tales of Po | Crane | Voice |

== Theater credits ==
| Year | Title | Role | Venue | Director | Ref. |
|---|---|---|---|---|---|
| 2018 | Annie | Bert Healy | Hollywood Bowl (Los Angeles, California) | Michael Arden | |
| 2024 | Hazbin Hotel: Live on Broadway | Alastor the Radio Demon | Majestic Theatre (New York City) | Vivienne Medrano | |
