= David Soren (animator) =

Canadian animator (born 1973)

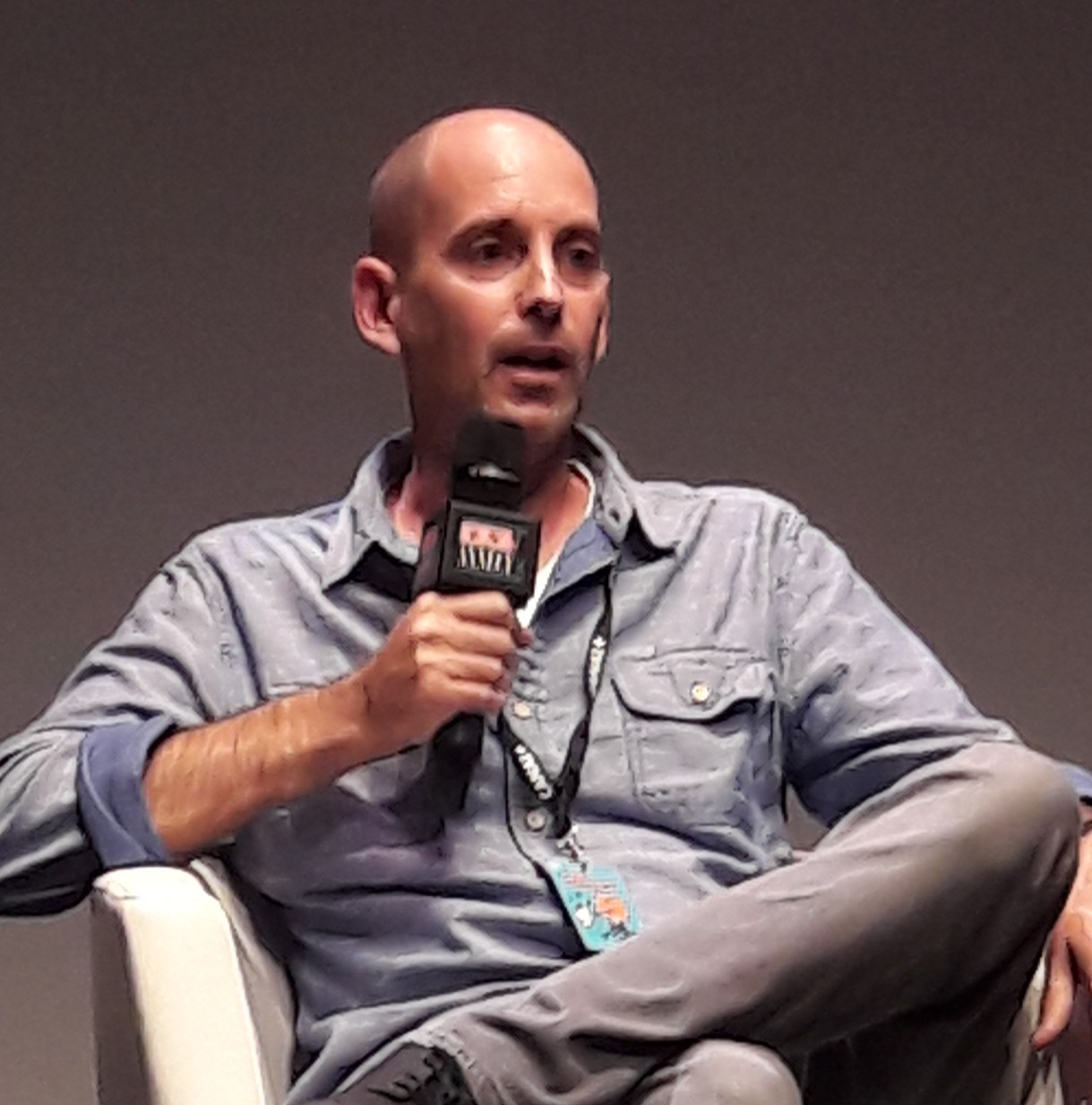
- Soren at the 2017 Annecy International Animated Film Festival
- Born: April 19, 1973 (age 53); Toronto, Ontario, Canada
- Education: Sheridan College
- Occupations: Director; animator; writer; voice actor; storyboard artist
- Years active: 1995–present
- Employer(s): DreamWorks Animation (1999–2021); Paramount Animation (2020–present)
- Notable work: Turbo; Captain Underpants: The First Epic Movie; Under the Boardwalk

David Soren (born April 19, 1973) is a Canadian animator, director, writer, voice actor, and storyboard artist at DreamWorks Animation. His most notable work are TV specials based on the Madagascar film franchise: Merry Madagascar and Madly Madagascar. He directed the 2013 animated feature film Turbo, which is based on his own original concept, as well as the 2017 animated film Captain Underpants: The First Epic Movie based on Dav Pilkey's Captain Underpants book series.

== Early life and career ==
Soren was born in Toronto, Canada, was raised in Hamilton, and graduated from Sheridan College. His final student project, an animated short film, Mr. Lucky, received many accolades, and was accepted into competition for the 1997 Academy Award. Before joining DreamWorks Animation, he worked at Toronto-based Nelvana as an animator and storyboard artist.

At DreamWorks, he worked as a story artist on Chicken Run, Shrek and Over the Hedge, and as head of story on Shark Tale. In 2009, he directed and wrote his first film, a TV Christmas special, Merry Madagascar, followed by a 2013 TV Valentine's Day special, Madly Madagascar, also written and directed by Soren.

Soren made his feature directorial debut in 2013, directing Turbo. It received mixed-to-positive reviews which won him an Annie Award for Directing in a Feature Production. He was also the creative consultant on its television series, Turbo Fast.

He voiced the muscle-sized baby Jimbo in The Boss Baby and directed his second feature film Captain Underpants: The First Epic Movie and voiced Tommy which is based on Dav Pilkey's comic books Captain Underpants, which the movie and books would later get adapted into a Netflix television series titled The Epic Tales of Captain Underpants. However, Soren was not involved with the show. He reprised his role as Jimbo in The Boss Baby's sequel, The Boss Baby: Family Business.

Soren directed a full-length feature film for Paramount Animation titled Under the Boardwalk.

In February 2023, it was announced that Soren would write and direct a feature film based on Geronimo Stilton for Radar Pictures.

In August 2025, it was announced that Soren would direct an original feature film for Spin Master Entertainment.

== Filmography ==
=== Film ===
Year	Film	Credited as					
Year	Film	Director	(Original) Story by	Producer	Other	Voice	Notes
2000	The Road to El Dorado	No	No	No	Yes	N/A	Storyboard artist
2000	Chicken Run	No	No	No	Yes	N/A	Additional storyboard artist
2001	Shrek	No	No	No	Yes	N/A	Story artist
2004	Shark Tale	No	Yes	No	Yes	Shrimp, Worm, Starfish #1, Killer Whale #2	N/A
2006	Over the Hedge	No	No	No	Yes	N/A	Story artist
2008	Madagascar: Escape 2 Africa	No	No	No	Yes	Lemur	N/A
2010	How To Train Your Dragon	No	No	No	Yes	N/A	Special thanks
2013	Turbo	Yes	Yes	No	Yes	Worker Snail #1, Can't Tuck Snail, Gagné Crew Chief, Indy Network Executive, Newspaper Boy, Autotune Kid	N/A
2014	Penguins of Madagascar	No	No	No	Yes	N/A	Special thanks
2017	The Boss Baby	No	No	No	Yes	Jimbo	Special thanks
2017	Captain Underpants: The First Epic Movie	Yes	No	No	Yes	Tommy	Additional screenplay material
2021	The Boss Baby: Family Business	No	No	No	Yes	Jimbo	N/A
2023	Under the Boardwalk	Yes	Yes	No	Yes	Yoga Crab	N/A
TBD	Geronimo Stilton	Yes	Yes	No	No	TBD	

=== Television ===
Year	Title	Role	Notes
2009	Merry Madagascar	Lookout lemur/additional lemurs	Director/writer
2010	Neighbors from Hell	Josh Hellman	Actor
2013	Madly Madagascar		Director/writer
2013–2016	Turbo FAST		Creative consultant
