= David Jahn (filmmaker) =

Swiss-Czech filmmaker and musician

- Born: 2 September 1975 (age 50); Zürich, Switzerland
- Occupations: neo-burlesque impresario, filmmaker, musician
- Years active: 1997–present
- Spouse: Terézia Mia
- Parent(s): Karel Jahn (1949-2009); Hana Jahn (b. 1948)
- Website: Prague Burlesque; Deep Side Production

David Jahn (born 2 September 1975) is a Swiss and Czech neo-burlesque impresario, filmmaker and musician based in Prague, Czech Republic.

== Burlesque ==
Jahn is best known for his louche MC persona Sonny Vargas with the stage troupe Prague Burlesque, which he founded in 2007 and developed into a local institution and international touring company. According to Prague TV, "his aim is to continue the long tradition of burlesque, and to make this concept popular once again." Prior to the stage debut of Prague Burlesque in September 2007, the last burlesque performance in Prague had taken place in 1910.

Inspired by the Weimar culture of interwar Berlin, as well as by Michelle Carr's 1990s Los Angeles revival troupe Velvet Hammer Burlesque and by Dita Von Teese, Jahn maintains that the genre adheres to a strict set of rules. "For instance, I never reveal a woman's entire nude body. Rather, I indicate what lay beyond her undergarments, always working with the feeling that more will follow. The essence of burlesque is in parodying courtesanal modes of conduct, which I like to unfold—gangasrotogati—in what might be called the gentle spirit of sarcastic orgasm. By and large, our work is erotic comedy," he told Czech Television in 2011. Moreover, burlesque resonates with Jahn's childhood—two of his grandparents were opera singers, and as an adult he enjoys watching this erotic form of operetta make its return to the European stage.

== Film ==
As a filmmaker, Jahn directs and produces music videos, television commercials and documentaries. His best-known directorial work is the 2009 feature documentary H.R. Giger Revealed, which he also coproduced through his company Deep Side Production s.r.o.
