= H. (2014 film) =

- Directed by: Rania Attieh; Daniel Garcia
- Written by: Rania Attieh; Daniel Garcia
- Produced by: Rania Attieh; Iván Eibuszyc; Shruti Ganguly; Daniel Garcia; Matthew Thurm; Pierce Varous
- Starring: Robin Bartlett; Rebecca Dayan; Will Janowitz; Roger Robinson
- Release date: 2014
- Running time: 96 minutes
- Country: United States
- Language: English

H. is a 2014 American film by filmmaking duo Rania Attieh and Daniel Garcia. The film is set in Troy, New York. Actress Robin Bartlett was nominated for an Independent Spirit Award for Best Supporting Female in 2016 for her work in the film.

== Plot ==
Two women in Troy, New York deal with the aftermath of an apparent meteor strike.

== Cast ==
- Robin Bartlett as Helen
- Rebecca Dayan as Helen
- Will Janowitz as Alex
- Julian Gamble as Roy
- Roger Robinson as Harold

== Production ==
H. was made as part of the Venice Biennale College- Cinema Program. From the writing to the premiere of the film took approximately six months.

== Release ==
The film premiered at the 71st Venice International Film Festival and went on to play at the 2015 Sundance Film Festival.

The film received mostly positive reviews and holds an 86% on Rotten Tomatoes, with The New York Times calling it "a clever film" and AV Club reviewer Mike D'Angelo stating "its unusual amalgam of low-key, keenly observed naturalism and WTF inexplicability is potent enough to keep viewers enraptured." A critic for The Hollywood Reporter ruled that "the film ultimately disappoints."
