= Leslie Grossman =

American actress (born 1971)

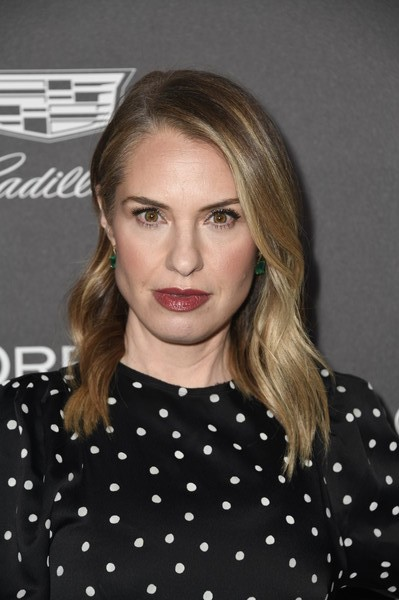
- Born: Leslie Erin Grossman; October 25, 1971 (age 55); Los Angeles, California, U.S.
- Education: Sarah Lawrence College
- Occupation: Actress
- Years active: 1998–present
- Spouse: Jon Bronson (m. 1999; sep. 2020) Sascha Penn (m. 2025)
- Children: 1

Leslie Erin Grossman (born October 25, 1971) is an American actress. She is known for her role as Lauren on The WB sitcom What I Like About You, and for her frequent collaborations with Ryan Murphy, appearing as Mary Cherry on The WB's comedy-drama series Popular (1999–2001), and as various characters on the FX anthology series American Horror Story since 2017. Grossman also had a recurring role on the television series 10 Things I Hate About You, a reboot of the original cult classic movie of the same name.

== Early life and education ==
Grossman was born and raised in Los Angeles, California. She attended Crossroads School for Arts & Sciences, where she directed plays. She started acting in her senior year at Sarah Lawrence College.

== Career ==
In 1999, Grossman was cast in her first major role, playing supporting character Mary Cherry in The WB high school drama series Popular. She had auditioned for the roles of Sam McPherson and Nicole Julian on Popular before having the part of Mary Cherry written for her. After Popular, Grossman joined the cast of The WB sitcom What I Like About You with Amanda Bynes and Jennie Garth. She had a recurring role in the first season before being added to the main cast in the second season. She played Lauren, the co-worker and best friend of Val Tyler (Garth).

On television, Grossman has appeared on Nip/Tuck, Charmed and CSI: Crime Scene Investigation, amongst other television series. In 2011 she guest starred on ABC Family's Melissa and Joey, and in 2012 she appeared on The New Normal and Ben and Kate. On film, Grossman appeared in Miss Congeniality 2: Armed and Fabulous in 2005. She appeared in two movies in 2006, Running with Scissors in an uncredited role and in Itty Bitty Titty Committee as Maude.

In 2017, she joined the cast of the seventh season of American Horror Story as Meadow Wilton and a flashback version of the infamous serial killer and Manson Family gang member Patricia Krenwinkel. In 2018, she was promoted to series regular for its eighth season portraying witch Coco St. Pierre Vanderbilt. She later appeared in the ninth season as Camp Redwood's owner Margaret Booth. She returned for the tenth season as a strong-willed literary agent named Ursula & an Area 51 researcher named Dr. Calico in the same season, for the eleventh season as Barbara, a New York City citizen that is going through a harrowing divorce process, and in the twelfth season she plays Ashleigh, a seemingly supernatural PR campaigner. Her appearances on the show mark the fourth collaboration between Grossman and Ryan Murphy, having appeared on Popular, Nip/Tuck, The New Normal, and American Horror Story. In 2024, she appeared in the Netflix biographical crime drama series Monsters: The Lyle and Erik Menendez Story as Judalon Smyth, the mistress of the Menendez brothers' therapist Jerome Oziel.

== Personal life ==
Grossman has a daughter, Goldie. Grossman is Jewish. She is married to Sascha Penn.

== Filmography ==
=== Film ===
Year	Title	Role	Notes
1998	The Opposite of Sex	Girl Student	
1998	Can't Hardly Wait	Ready to Have Sex's Friend	
2005	Miss Congeniality 2: Armed and Fabulous	Pam	
2006	Running with Scissors	Sue	Uncredited
2007	Itty Bitty Titty Committee	Maude	
2007	What We Do Is Secret		Uncredited
2009	Spring Breakdown	Hooker	
2022	Studio 666	Barb Weems	

=== Television ===
Year	Title	Role	Notes
1998	Guys Like Us	Amy	Episode: "Pilot"
1999–2001	Popular	Mary Cherry	Main role
2000	Girl Band	Mindy	Television film
2002	Any Day Now	Mildred Harrison	Episode: "Let the Games Begin"
2002	Charmed	Phoebe's Assistant	Episode: "Witch Way Now?"
2003–2008	Nip/Tuck	Bliss Berger	3 episodes
2003	CSI: Crime Scene Investigation	Wendy Orr	Episode: "One Hit Wonder"
2003–2006	What I Like About You	Lauren	Main role
2006	The Jake Effect	Kimmy Ponder	6 episodes
2006	Help Me Help You	Kendra	Episode: "The Sheriff"
2007	What News?	Misti Lake	Television film
2007	Up All Night	Erika	Television film
2007	Notes from the Underbelly	Deena	Episode: "Not Without My Noodles"
2008	Grey's Anatomy	Lauren Hammer	Episode: "In the Midnight Hour"
2009	Trust Me	Julie Finn	2 episodes
2009	In the Motherhood	Maggie	2 episodes
2009–2010	10 Things I Hate About You	Darlene Tharp	6 episodes
2010	The Gentlemen's League	Leslie	Unsold television pilot
2010	Dexter	Laura Mendell	Episode: "Hop a Freighter"
2011	Hot in Cleveland	Elise	Episode: "I Love Lucci: Part One"
2011	Outsourced	Marcy Donovan	Episode: "Charlie Curries a Favor from Todd"
2011	Better with You	Francine	Episode: "Better Without a Job"
2011	Melissa & Joey	Emily	Episode: "The Mel Word"
2011	Drop Dead Diva	Kristin Mulraney	Episode: "You Bet Your Life"
2011–2012	I Hate My Teenage Daughter	Laura	Episodes: "Teenage Cotillion" and "Teenage Cheerleading"
2012	The New Normal	Melissa	Episode: "Pilot"
2012	Scandal	Lisa	3 episodes
2012	Ben and Kate	Nan	Episode: "Guitar Face"
2013	Whitney	Michelle	Episode: "Snapped"
2013	Major Crimes	Claire Hunter	Episode: "Poster Boy"
2014	Sean Saves the World	Susan	Episode: "Sean The Fabulous"
2014	Modern Family	Katie	Episode: "Three Dinners"
2015	Barely Famous	Herself	Episode: "Not a Booty Call"
2015	2 Broke Girls	Amy	Episode: "And the Gym and Juice"
2015	Nicky, Ricky, Dicky & Dawn	Robin	2 episodes
2016	The Soul Man	Megan	Episode: "Hangin' with Mr. Cupper"
2016	Faking It	Diane	Episodes: "Third Wheels" and "Up in Flames"
2016	Grandfathered	Leslie	Episode: "Baby Model"
2017	Speechless	Mother in supermarket	Episode: "D-I Ding"
2017	Love	Liz	Episode: "Friends Night Out"
2017	American Horror Story: Cult	Meadow Wilton	Recurring role; 6 episodes
2017	American Horror Story: Cult	Patricia Krenwinkel	Episode: "Charles (Manson) in Charge"
2017–2018	The Good Place	Donna Shellstrop	3 episodes
2018	Black-ish	Gwen	Episode: "North Star"
2018	American Horror Story: Apocalypse	Coco St. Pierre Vanderbilt	Main role; 8 episodes
2018	Fuller House	Dr. Lesley Miller	Episode: "Opening Night"
2019	American Horror Story: 1984	Margaret Booth	Main role; 8 episodes
2019	Goliath	Rochelle Purple	4 episodes
2019–2020	Shrill	Cindy	2 episodes
2019–2020	The Goldbergs	Jane Bales	2 episodes
2020	Santa Inc.	Cookie	8 episodes
2020–2022	Love, Victor	Georgina Cunningham	6 episodes
2021	American Horror Story: Double Feature	Ursula Khan	Main role; 6 episodes
2021	American Horror Story: Double Feature	Calico	Main role; 6 episodes
2022	American Horror Story: NYC	Barbara Read	Main role; 7 episodes
2023	American Horror Story: Delicate	Ashleigh	Recurring role; 3 episodes
2024	Monsters: The Lyle and Erik Menendez Story	Judalon Smyth	Recurring role; 5 episodes
2024	Nobody Wants This	Rabbi Shira	Episode: "My Friend Joanne"
2026	Power Book III: Raising Kanan	Flossie Siegel	Recurring role; 7 episodes
2026	American Horror Story: 13	Coco St. Pierre Vanderbilt	Main role; 5 episodes
