= Isaac Powell =

American actor and singer (born 1994)

- Born: December 30, 1994 (age 31); Greensboro, North Carolina, U.S.
- Education: University of North Carolina School of the Arts (BFA)
- Occupations: Actor; singer
- Years active: 2015–present
- Partner: Wesley Taylor (2017–2021)

Isaac Cole Powell (born December 30, 1994) is an American actor and singer. He played the role of Daniel in the 2017 Broadway revival of the musical Once on This Island and Tony in the 2019 Broadway revival of West Side Story.

== Early life and education ==
Powell was raised in Greensboro, North Carolina, the youngest of three children born to Terry and Will Powell, a three-time world CrossFit champion. His father is Black; his mother is white. His sister, Jessica Powell, is a Certified Personal trainer at their father's fitness studio and is featured on TLC's My Big Fat Fabulous Life as Whitney's fitness trainer. Powell began to act in middle school with the Community Theatre of Greensboro. He attended Philip J. Weaver Academy, a performing arts high school, before transferring to a boarding program at the University of North Carolina School of the Arts (UNCSA) during his senior year of high school. He graduated from UNCSA with an acting degree in May 2017.

== Career ==
=== 2010s ===
While in college, Powell began to accumulate professional acting credits, playing Nikos in the musical Legally Blonde at the Barn Dinner Theatres. After graduation, in the summer of 2017, he appeared in Newsies and Mamma Mia! with the Pittsburgh Civic Light Opera and originated the title role in Nikola Tesla Drops the Beat at the Adirondack Theatre Festival in Glens Falls, New York.

Powell played the role of Daniel in the 2017 Broadway revival of Once on This Island, which began previews in November 2017 and opened officially in December. Jesse Green, writing in The New York Times called Powell's solo, "Some Girls," a "quietly sensitive rendering." Robert Hofler, in TheWrap, wrote that Powell makes the song "the most poignant moment in this revival." TheaterMania's review deemed Powell, "charismatic and silvery-voiced." He recorded his role on the revival's cast album.

Powell competed in May 2018 on the live Broadway game show, I Only Have Lies for You. In the spring of 2018, he signed on with the New Pandemics modeling agency and modeled for Palomo Spain's and NIHL's fall 2019 lines at New York Fashion Week. In W Magazine, Powell notes that "[M]odeling is a new thing ... I've been basically shooting all the gay publications, which is really, really great." He models in addition to acting, and was featured in the final issue of Hello Mr.

=== 2020s ===
Powell played Tony in the 2020 Broadway revival of West Side Story. The production, directed by Ivo van Hove, began previews on December 10, 2019, and officially opened on February 20, 2020, at the Broadway Theatre, but closed early on March 11, 2020, due to the COVID-19 pandemic.

In November 2020, Powell was cast in Universal Pictures and director Stephen Chbosky's film adaptation of Dear Evan Hansen as new character Rhys, a high school jock.

On August 29, 2021, Powell was featured in the Public Broadcasting Service (PBS) network's aired concert for the musical Wicked which was hosted by Kristin Chenoweth and Idina Menzel. Other featured artists were Rita Moreno, Cynthia Erivo, Ariana DeBose, Ali Stroker, Amber Riley, Mario Cantone, Jennifer Nettles, Stephanie Hsu, Alex Newell, Gavin Creel and Gabrielle Ruiz performing many of the musical's numbers.

In the summer of 2024, he starred as Jay Gatsby in the world premiere of Florence Welch's Gatsby: An American Myth at the American Repertory Theatre. The production was directed by Rachel Chavkin and it opened at the Loeb Drama Center in Cambridge, Massachusetts, on June 12, 2024. He appeared in The Moment. In June of 2026, Powell was announced to have a guest appearance in the season 2 of Adults.

== Personal life ==
Powell is gay and came out at the age of 16. In 2016, Powell met Broadway actor, Wesley Taylor, when Taylor was visiting University of North Carolina School of the Arts where Powell was a junior in the school's theatre program. The two then began a relationship in 2017 and were engaged in May 2019. They ended their relationship in 2021. Powell than began a relationship with Tate Justus in late 2023 to early 2024 and are currently still together.

== Filmography ==
=== Film ===
Year	Title	Role	Notes
2015	Just a Body	Pastor Dave	Short film
2019	XaveMePlease	Xavier	Short film
2021	Dear Evan Hansen	Rhys	
2022	Susie Searches	Ray Garcia	
2023	Cat Person	Clay	
2023	Past Lives	Guy	
2023	Our Son	Solo	
2026	The Moment	Lloyd	

=== Television ===
Year	Title	Role	Notes
2018	Broadway.com #LiveatFive	Himself	1 episode
2018	Murphy Brown	Jack	Episode: "A Lifetime of Achievement"
2018–2019	Indoor Boys	Logan	6 episodes
2021	Modern Love	Vince	Episode: "A Life Plan for Two, Followed by One"
2021	American Horror Story: Double Feature	Troy Lord	4 episodes
2022	American Horror Story: NYC	Theo Graves	7 episodes
2024	The Franchise	Bryson	Main role
2026	The Beauty	Manny (Post Beauty)	Episodes: "Beautiful Chimp Face" and "Beautiful Living Rooms"
2026	Adults	Eric	Episode: "Fake ID"

== Theatre ==
Year	Title	Role	Theatre	Director(s)	Ref.
2017	Nikola Tesla Drops The Beat	Nikola Tesla	Adirondack Theatre Festival	Marshall Pailet	
2017	Newsies	Ensemble	Pittsburgh Civic Light Opera (at the Benedum Center)	Richard J. Hinds	
2017	Mamma Mia!	Ensemble	Pittsburgh Civic Light Opera (at the Benedum Center)	Barry Ivan	
2017–19	Once on This Island	Daniel Beauxhomme	Circle in the Square Theatre	Michael Arden	
2019–20	West Side Story	Tony	Broadway Theatre	Ivo van Hove	
2024	Gatsby: An American Myth	Jay Gatsby	American Repertory Theatre	Rachel Chavkin	

== Awards and nominations ==
Year	Awards	Category	Nominated work	Result	Ref.
2019	Grammy Awards	Best Musical Theater Album	Once on This Island	Nominated	
2020	Drama League Awards	Distinguished Performance	West Side Story	Nominated	
