= American Horror Story: Double Feature =

Tenth season of American Horror Story

- Season 10
- Promotional poster
- Showrunner: Ryan Murphy
- Starring: Sarah Paulson; Evan Peters; Lily Rabe; Finn Wittrock; Frances Conroy; Billie Lourd; Leslie Grossman; Adina Porter; Angelica Ross; Macaulay Culkin; Ryan Kiera Armstrong; Neal McDonough; Kaia Gerber; Nico Greetham; Isaac Powell; Rachel Hilson; Rebecca Dayan
- No. of episodes: 10

Release
- Original network: FX
- Original release: August 25 – October 20, 2021

Season chronology
- ← Previous; 1984 Next → NYC

The tenth season of the American horror anthology television series American Horror Story, subtitled Double Feature (stylised in the opening credits with the alternate subtitle Chapter 10), is composed of two stories, with Red Tide being told over the first six episodes, and Death Valley over the remaining four. The first story, Red Tide, focuses on a family in Provincetown, Massachusetts, who meet the town's mysterious true inhabitants. The second story, Death Valley, follows a group of camping students who find themselves in the midst of a conspiracy involving extraterrestrials. While there is no direct tie-in to previous seasons, the motif of extraterrestrials is present in Asylum. Also, the “family-moved-to-new-location” motif is present in both Murder House and Roanoke.

The ensemble cast includes veterans Sarah Paulson, Evan Peters, Lily Rabe, Finn Wittrock, Frances Conroy, Billie Lourd, Leslie Grossman, Adina Porter, and Angelica Ross, as well as newcomers Macaulay Culkin, Ryan Kiera Armstrong, Neal McDonough, Kaia Gerber, Nico Greetham, Isaac Powell, Rachel Hilson, and Rebecca Dayan.

Created by Ryan Murphy and Brad Falchuk for the cable network FX, the series is produced by 20th Television. Double Feature was broadcast from August 25 to October 20, 2021, consisting of 10 episodes. Originally scheduled to premiere in late 2020, its production was delayed as result of the COVID-19 pandemic.

== Cast and characters ==
Red Tide main cast

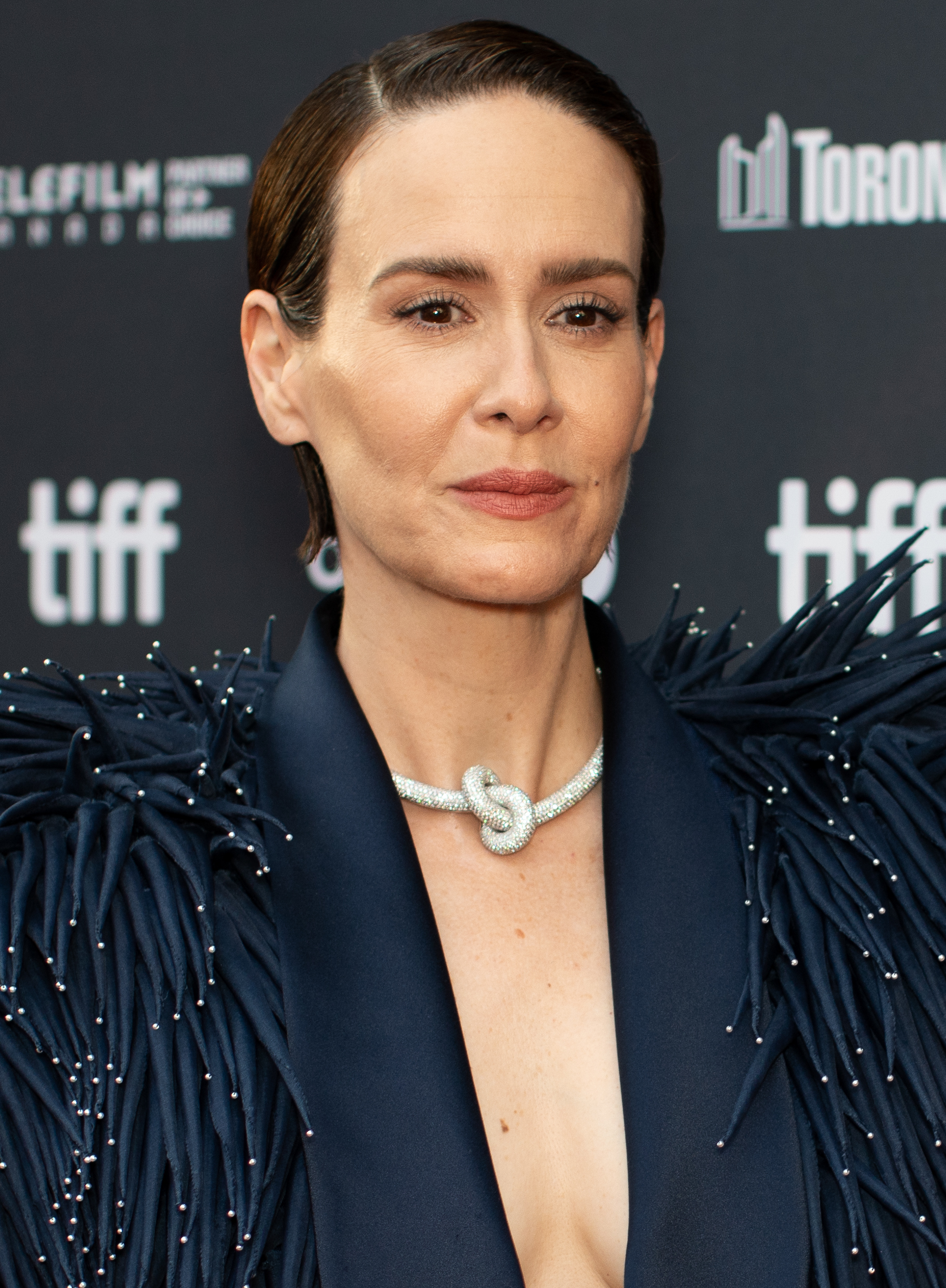
Sarah Paulson

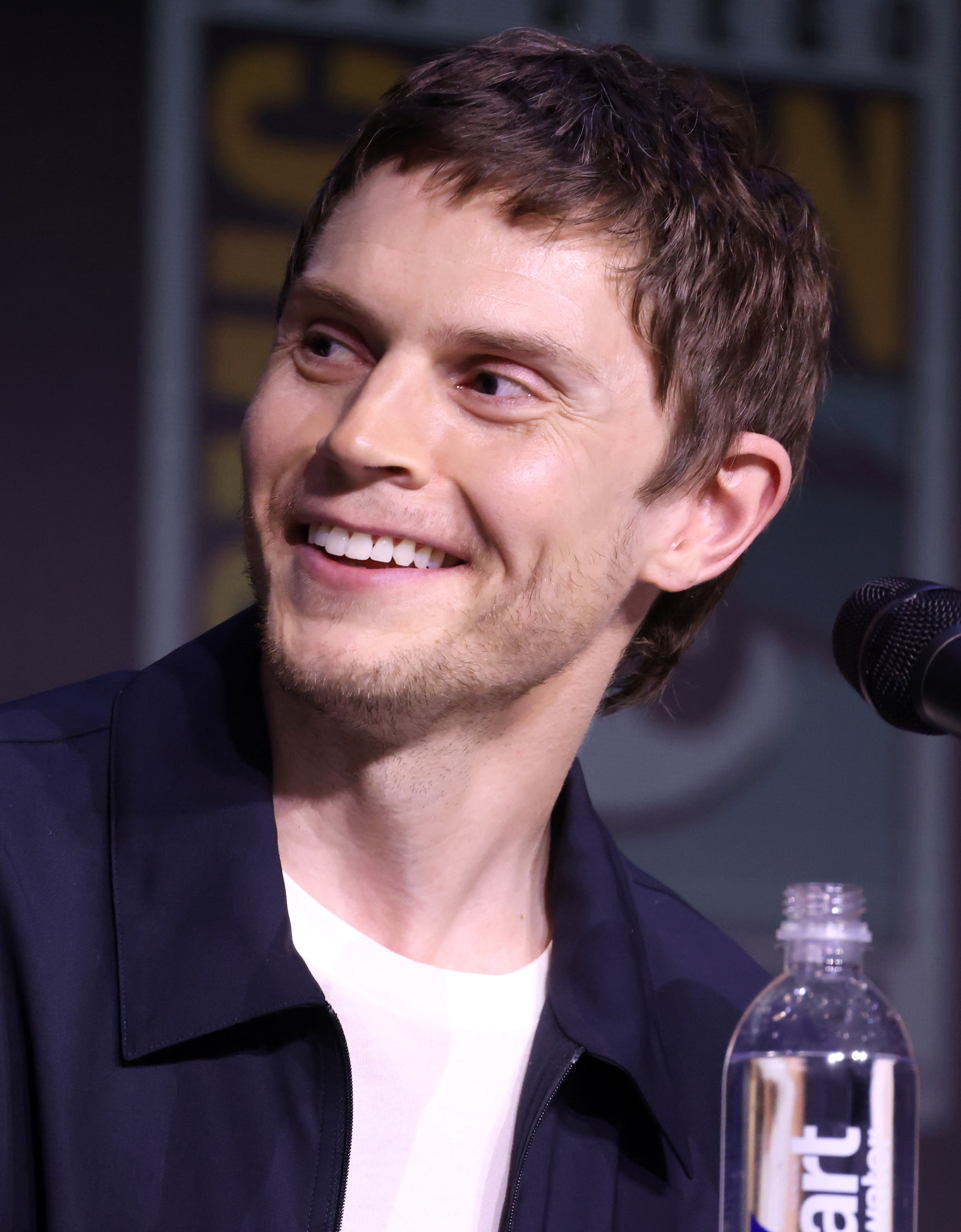
Evan Peters

Lily Rabe

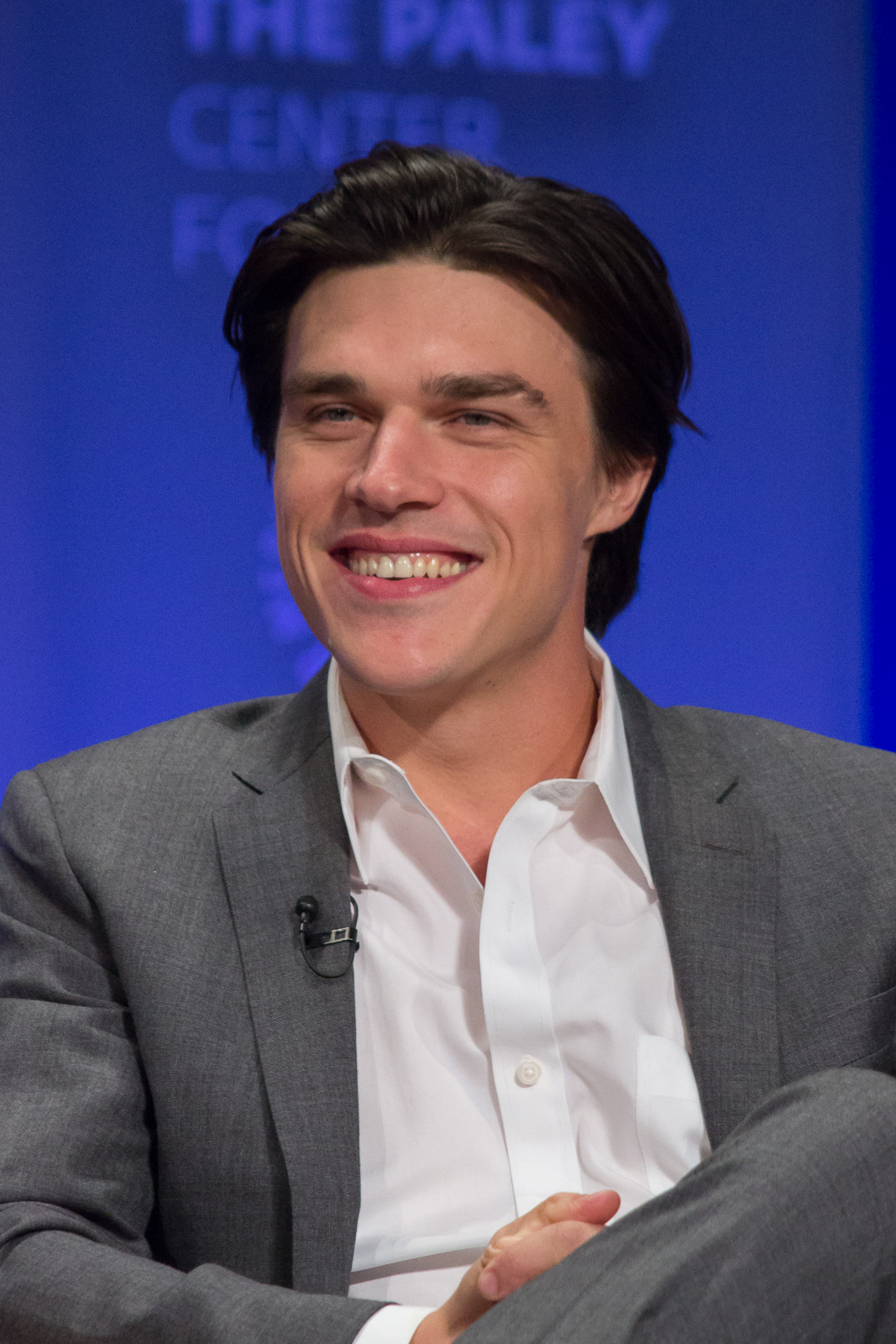
Finn Wittrock

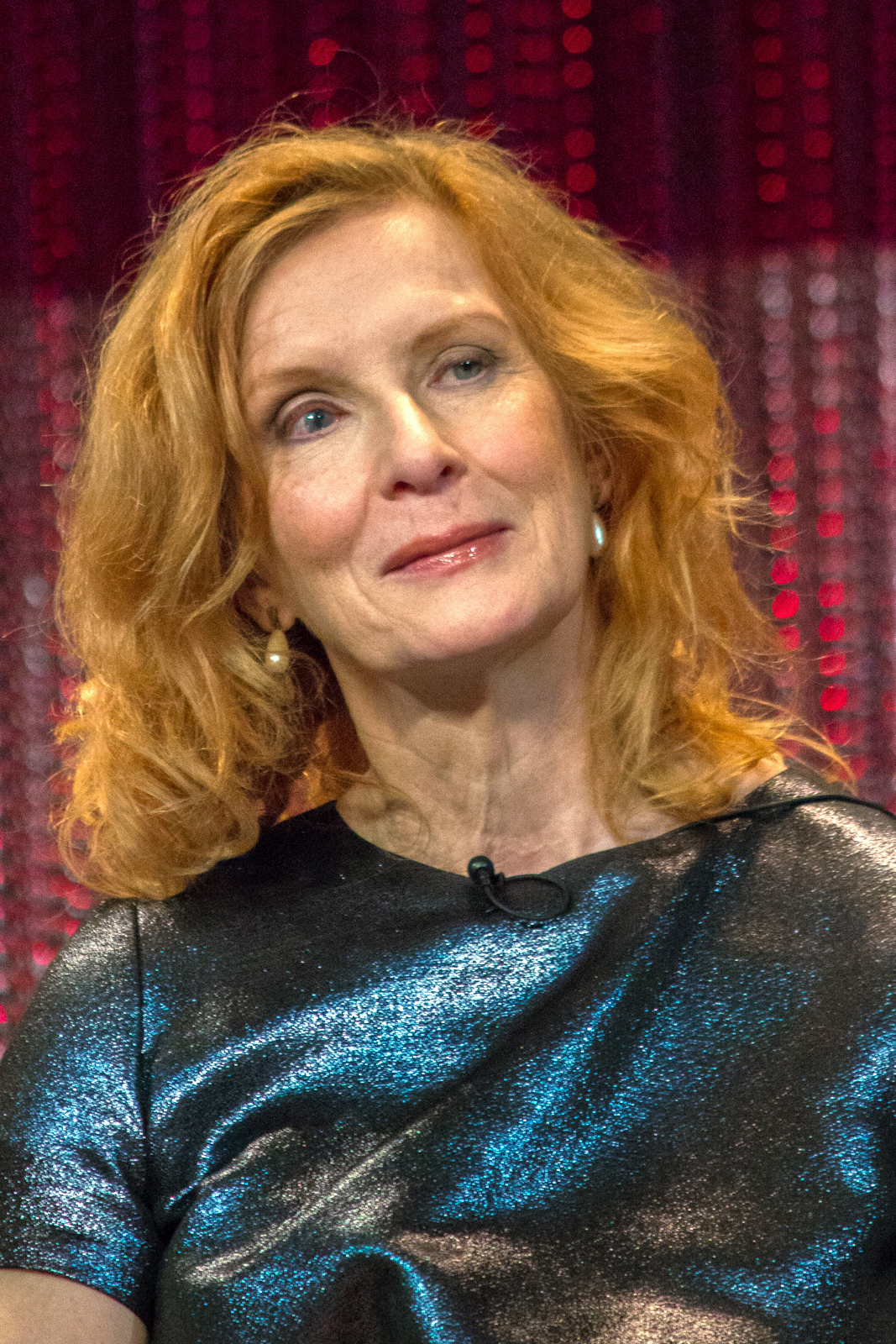
Frances Conroy

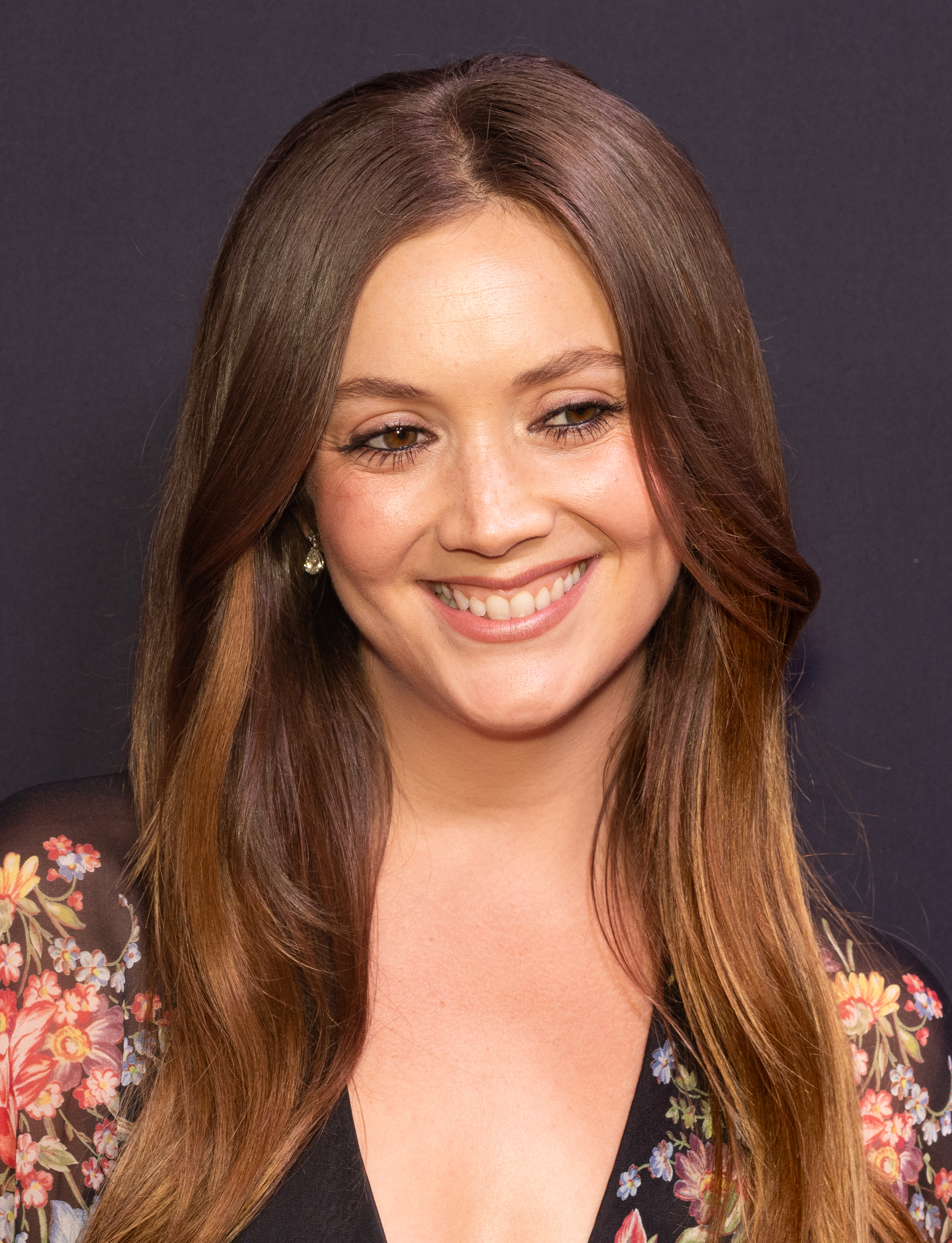
Billie Lourd

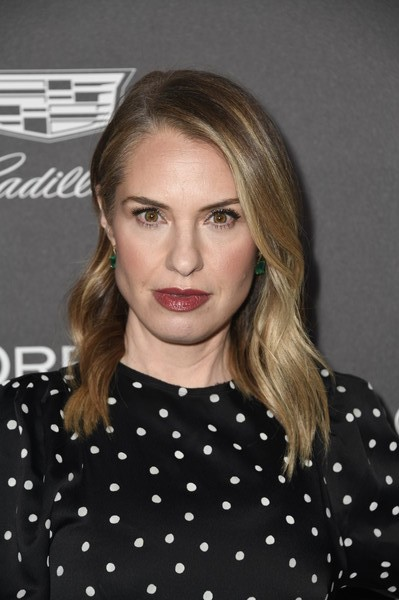
Leslie Grossman

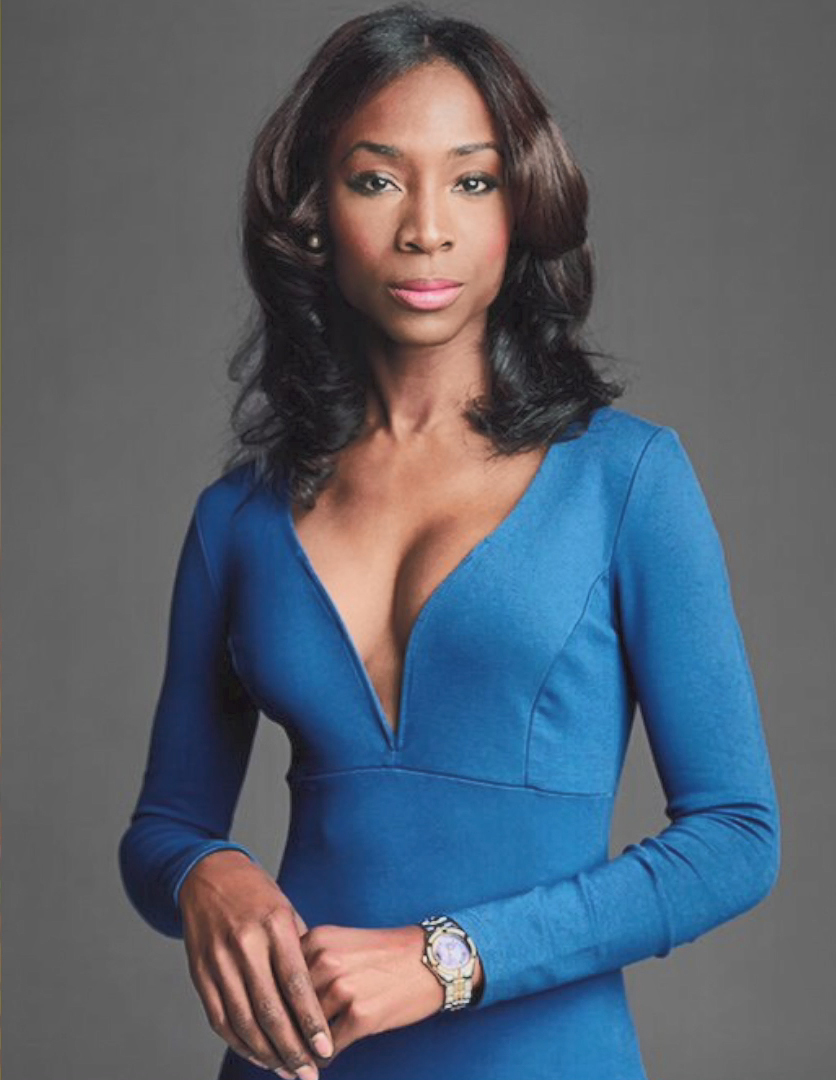
Angelica Ross

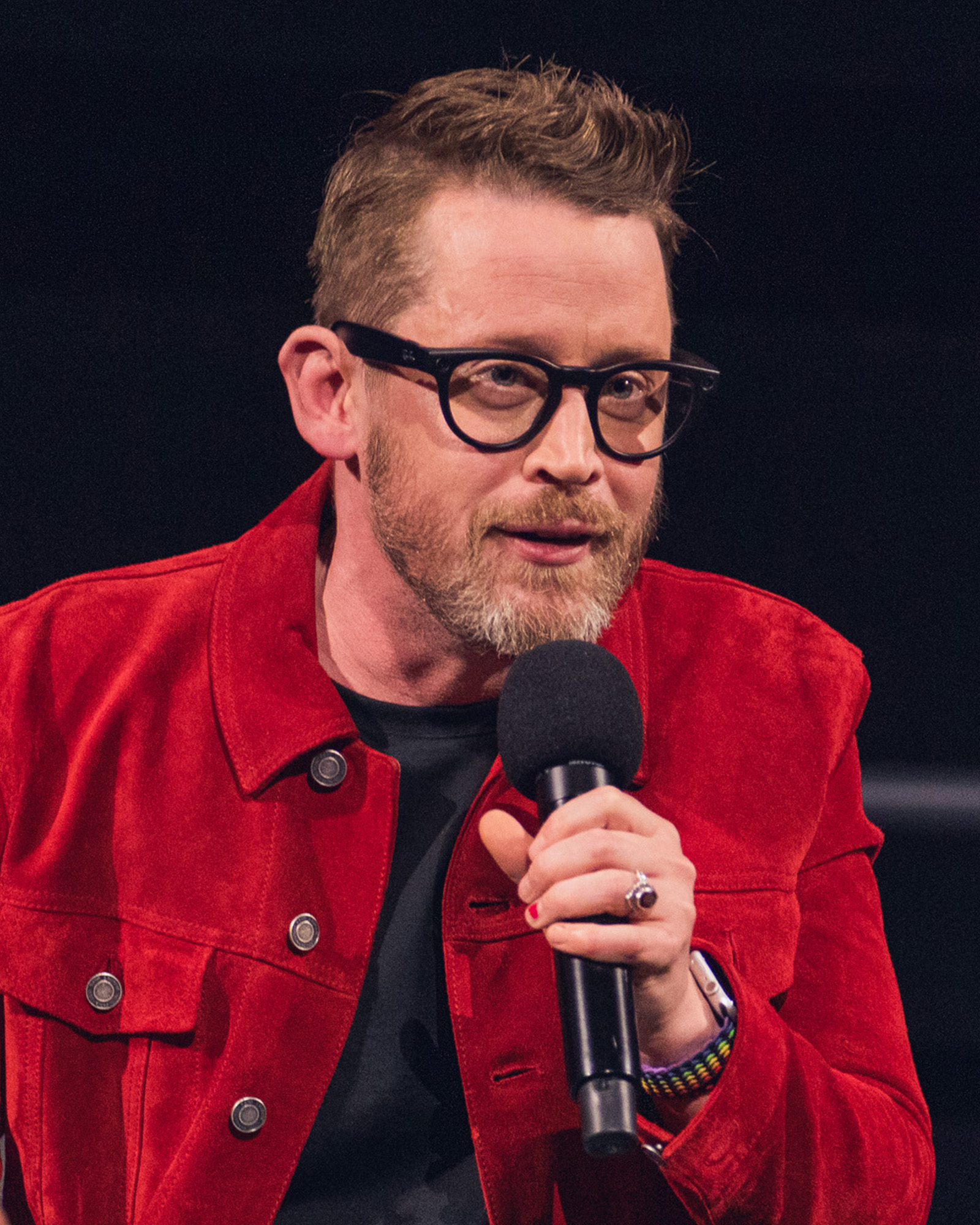
Macaulay Culkin

=== Part 1: Red Tide ===
==== Main ====
- Sarah Paulson as Karen / "Tuberculosis Karen"
- Evan Peters as Austin Sommers
- Lily Rabe as Doris Gardner
- Finn Wittrock as Harry Gardner
- Frances Conroy as Sarah Cunningham/Belle Noir
- Billie Lourd as Dr. Leslie 'Lark' Feldman
- Leslie Grossman as Ursula Khan
- Adina Porter as Chief Ava Burleson
- Angelica Ross as Connie “The Chemist” Gill
- Macaulay Culkin as Mickey Mayo
- Ryan Kiera Armstrong as Alma Gardner

==== Recurring ====
- Denis O'Hare as Holden Vaughn
- Robin Weigert as Martha Edwards
- Spencer Novich as Vlad

==== Guest ====
- Blake Shields as Tony
- Jim Ortlieb as Ray Cunningham
- Eureka O'Hara as Crystal DeCanter
- Dot-Marie Jones as Trooper Jan Remy

=== Part 2: Death Valley ===
Additional Death Valley main cast

Neal McDonough

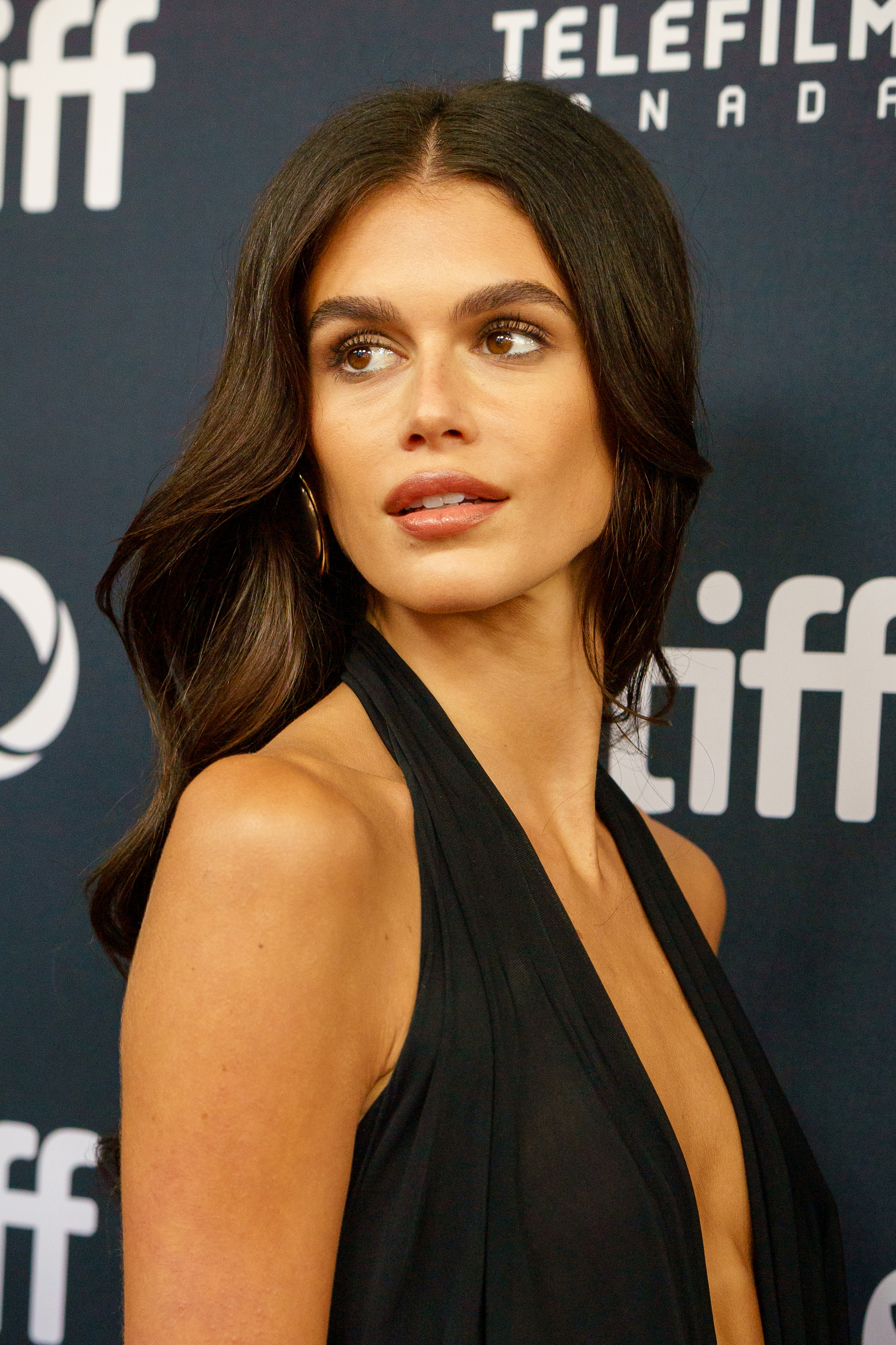
Kaia Gerber

==== Main ====
- Sarah Paulson as Mamie Eisenhower
- Lily Rabe as Amelia Earhart
- Leslie Grossman as Calico
- Angelica Ross as Theta
- Neal McDonough as Dwight D. Eisenhower
- Kaia Gerber as Kendall Carr
- Nico Greetham as Cal Cambon
- Isaac Powell as Troy Lord
- Rachel Hilson as Jamie Howard
- Rebecca Dayan as Maria Wycoff

==== Recurring ====
- Cody Fern as Valiant Thor
- Craig Sheffer as Richard Nixon
- Christopher Stanley as Sherman Adams
- Mike Vogel as John F. Kennedy
- Alisha Soper as Marilyn Monroe
- Briana Lane as Dr. Richards

==== Guest ====
- Bryce Johnson as Neil Armstrong
- Vincent Foster as Henry Kissinger

== Episodes ==
No. overall	No. in season	Title	Directed by	Written by	Original release date	Prod. code	US viewers (millions)
Part 1: Red Tide
104	1	"Cape Fear"	John J. Gray	Brad Falchuk	August 25, 2021	AATS01	0.925
Writer Harry Gardner, his pregnant wife Doris, and their nine-year-old daughter Alma travel from their home in New York City to Provincetown, Massachusetts, for a three-month winter season trip. Doris and Alma go on a walk and are stalked by a pale man in a trenchcoat. Police Chief Burleson assures the Gardners that Provincetown is a safe place and that they were likely rushed by an opioid addict. One night, Harry goes out to a local bar-restaurant, named the Muse, where he meets Belle Noir and Austin Sommers, a famous erotica novelist and a playwright, respectively. Harry is delighted to speak with the two about art and inspiration, as he is spending his time in Provincetown reworking a pilot. Harry returns home and the pale man attacks him. Harry kills the man in self-defense. The next day, the Gardners plan to leave Provincetown for good, but before they go, Harry receives a phone call from Austin promising him a "cure" for his writer's block. Austin gives Harry a plastic baggie of black pills, also named the Muse. Harry is hesitant to take them, but downs one in front of Alma after a phone call with his agent encouraging him to stay in Provincetown and finish the pilot.
105	2	"Pale"	Loni Peristere	Brad Falchuk	August 25, 2021	AATS02	0.581
The effects of the pill are immediate on Harry and he ravenously finishes the pilot in four hours. Harry's agent Ursula notifies him that his show has been bought by Netflix and Joaquin Phoenix wants to star in it for free. Soon after, Harry begins to develop a taste for blood and sucks on Doris's finger after she accidentally slices it open. Austin explains to Harry that the Muse has the side effects of turning the "talentless" into monstrous pale creatures and creating a thirst for blood in people with talent so long as they keep taking it. Meanwhile, a male prostitute named Mickey with dreams of screenwriting debates taking the Muse, but a homeless woman nicknamed Tuberculosis Karen by other Provincetown locals desperately advises him against it. Despite Karen's pleas, Mickey takes one. Alma, wanting to master a difficult piece on the violin, takes a pill from Harry's baggie. Alma later cruelly belittles Doris, accusing her of wanting to leave Provincetown because she's jealous of her and Harry's talent. Doris grounds Alma but later discovers Harry has allowed her to go on a walk by herself. Doris frantically searches for Alma and finds her in a graveyard devouring an animal.
106	3	"Thirst"	Loni Peristere	Brad Falchuk	September 1, 2021	AATS03	0.697
Ursula arrives in Provincetown to check on Harry. At the Muse, she insults Belle and Austin's singing performance. The next day, Mickey implores Ursula to read his scripts. Ursula is dumbfounded by Mickey's talent and he tells her about the pills. Mickey sneaks into Belle's house to steal some for her. Meanwhile, Belle and Austin discover Alma has taken the pill and threaten Harry at gunpoint. Belle orders Mickey to murder Ursula but instead he takes her to a meeting with a well-dressed woman known only as 'the Chemist', the creator of the pills, to discuss wide-distribution of them. Later, the Chemist instructs Belle and Austin to kill Ursula, Mickey, Harry, Alma, and Doris for causing too much trouble. Harry discovers Alma has killed Chief Burleson and Ursula is aware of it.
107	4	"Blood Buffet"	Axelle Carolyn	Brad Falchuk	September 8, 2021	AATS04	0.610
Five years earlier, the Chemist moves to Provincetown and pays Mickey to find her test subjects for the black pills. Mickey's friend Vlad, an aspiring singer, takes a pill and starts to feel sick. He confronts the Chemist after losing all of his hair and she tells him he cannot handle the effects of the pill because he has no talent. After also being introduced to the pills by Mickey, Belle Noir writes and finishes a book in one night and then kills her abusive husband. Two years later, Vlad has physically transformed into a monstrous pale creature. Belle watches Austin lip-sync in drag at the Muse and proceeds to offer him a pill. That night, they go to the house of a fellow drag queen, and slaughter all of them except one. The surviving drag queen goes into the woods and Vlad jumps from behind and kills her.
108	5	"Gaslight"	John J. Gray	Brad Falchuk & Manny Coto	September 15, 2021	AATS05	0.642
In the present day, Doris gives birth to a boy and is kept in a drug-induced haze by Harry, Alma, and Ursula to prevent her from finding out about the pills. Alma eventually reveals the truth to Doris and convinces her to take one. She succumbs to the disastrous side effects and Harry has to lock her in the bathroom after she attempts to kill their newborn baby, named Eli, for his blood. Meanwhile, Belle approaches Karen and orders her to steal the Gardner's baby. Horrified by a transformed Doris, Karen abandons her mission. She flees the Gardner's house and a horde of pale people corner her. Mickey appears and offers Karen an ultimatum; take a pill or be devoured by the pale people. Mickey leaves and the pale people swarm her until she takes a pill. The next day, Harry sets Doris free, letting her loose to roam Provincetown as a pale creature. At the beach, Karen attacks and feeds on Mickey, makes a painting, and then commits suicide by slitting her wrists and walking into the sea.
109	6	"Winter Kills"	John J. Gray	Ryan Murphy	September 22, 2021	AATS06	0.732
Holden Vaughn, a renowned interior designer and member of the Provincetown city council, orders Belle and Austin to take care of Harry and Alma after Chief Burleson's corpse is discovered by a fisherman. At the Gardner's house, Harry tells Alma they must both quit taking the pills for good. In the midst of an ensuing argument, Eli is kidnapped. Harry finds a threatening letter from Belle in Eli's crib. Ursula rallies a horde of pale people while Harry and Alma confront Belle and Austin. Ursula guns down the pale people after they descend upon Belle's house and kill Belle and Austin. Next, Alma kills Harry and feeds on him. Three months later, Alma lives in Los Angeles with Eli, Ursula and the Chemist. At a university, Ursula introduces the pill to a class of writing students, while Alma kills a fellow finalist for a classical orchestra after he insults her. Moments later, chaos and violence ensues as the pill is distributed to the masses. Disapproving of Ursula's behavior, the Chemist decides to leave town with Eli.
Part 2: Death Valley
110	7	"Take Me to Your Leader"	Max Winkler	Brad Falchuk & Kristen Reidel & Manny Coto	September 29, 2021	AATS07	0.687
In 1954 Albuquerque, New Mexico, dust devils take form after a supposed visit by UFOs. Maria Wycoff's son is taken over by a mysterious presence and tells her not to be afraid. Leaving a golf game in Palm Springs, California, President Dwight D. Eisenhower heads to the desert with a military convoy to take a look at a mysterious aircraft that was shot down by the Air Force. They also discover Amelia Earhart alive, but with mysterious marks on her back. She recalls how her plane's instruments malfunctioned, and claims blood was taken from her and things put in her. Doctors recover an alien body from the wreckage, but upon studying it, are attacked by a mysterious blob that kills both of them. In present day, a group of students, Troy, Cal, Kendall and Jamie; head out to the desert. They discover a lake that has been drained and a field of dead and mutilated bovines. After an encounter with a mysterious light, they all start to feel nausea and later discover all four of them—including the males—are pregnant.
111	8	"Inside"	Tessa Blake	Manny Coto & Kristen Reidel & Brad Falchuk	October 6, 2021	AATS08	0.483
In 1963, President John F. Kennedy learns from ex-President Dwight "Ike" Eisenhower that a secret alien treaty was signed during Eisenhower's presidency, which allows for 5,000 Americans to be abducted annually in exchange for alien technology. Kennedy plans to withdraw from the treaty and make it public, but is assassinated before he can do so. In 1954, an alien tells Eisenhower their goal is to adapt their offspring to survive Earth's environment so the species can go on. The first experimental alien newborn kills Amelia, its human host, and several doctors before Eisenhower shoots it himself. Mamie Eisenhower urges Vice President Richard Nixon to persuade her husband to make the deal. Ike confronts Mamie, but learns that her body has been taken hostage by an alien. In present day, Troy, Cal, Kendall and Jamie view the alien babies inside them through ultrasound at an OB-GYN clinic, when they are kidnapped by men in suits. Kendall briefly awakes and talks to a masked person. They reunite in a white room and meet a woman who has been experimented on multiple times over decades but has not aged. Troy panics and is taken to the masked person, who is revealed to be a human-alien hybrid.
112	9	"Blue Moon"	Laura Belsey & John J. Gray	Kristen Reidel & Manny Coto & Reilly Smith	October 13, 2021	AATS09	0.579
In 1954, Eisenhower struggles with the consequences of the signed treaty with the aliens. Three years later, more than 298 incursions have been observed, but no contact from the aliens has been communicated. They send a liaison, an android named Valiant Thor, to the White House, where he introduces a futuristic handheld computer. Some time later, Eisenhower discovers alien hybrids being stored in the basement of the White House, and later signs an executive order to have them moved to a facility in Nevada. Six years later, Eisenhower and Nixon accompany President Lyndon B. Johnson to the facility, where they meet Thor and shown a warehouse full of preserved hybrids. In present day, Troy successfully gives birth to a hybrid baby, but it is then killed by the aliens because it did not meet the correct specifications. He rejoins his friends a week later, and helps Cal with giving birth to his hybrid baby, without observation by Theta. Though successful, the newborn leaps up and starts chewing Cal's face.
113	10	"The Future Perfect"	Axelle Carolyn	Brad Falchuk & Manny Coto & Kristen Reidel & Reilly Smith	October 20, 2021	AATS10	0.579
In 1972, Nixon, now President, expresses frustration alongside Secretary of State Henry Kissinger about Thor's timetable lasting up to fifty years. Thor reassures them they have a lot of diversions planned to distract the public. Three years earlier, Eisenhower is on his death bed with Mamie by his side. He is offered immortality by Thor, but declines and is intent on dying. Mamie on the other hand, accepts Thor's offer. By 1979, she has faked her death and settled in Area 51, where she meets Calico. In present day, armed security enter Area 51 in search of Troy and Cal, who are both found dead. Cal's newborn attacks a soldier and they subdue it, but are in turn executed by Theta's team for their excessive force against the newborn. Jamie and Kendall search for Troy and Cal, but both go spontaneously into labor, and are restrained by Theta. After they both give birth, Theta has them killed, Jamie by her throat being sliced and Kendall beheaded, with her head being replaced by a mechanical device. Kendall's child was deemed to be the perfect hybrid and so her body will be used to birth more perfect hybrids; Theta reveals plans to clone Kendall's body and to shorten the gestation period to allow more hybrids to be born in less time. Mamie learns from Thor the extraterrestrial's plan to cause mass human genocide and take over the earth. Together with Calico, she attempts to stop Theta, but Calico betrays her as she is rewarded to become the hybrid's spiritual mother by Theta. In turn, Theta kills Mamie by exploding her head. Calico and Theta then deliver another "perfect" newborn.

== Production ==
=== Development ===
On August 3, 2018, the series was renewed for a 10th season, set to air in 2020. On May 26, 2020, it was announced that season 10 would be pushed back to 2021 due to production being stalled as a result of the COVID-19 pandemic. Following the interruption, series co-creator Ryan Murphy told in an interview with TheWrap that the delay could potentially change the season's theme, since his initial idea needed to be filmed during the warmer months of the year. The following month, Murphy unveiled a promotional poster for the season via his Instagram account; the image features a wide-open mouth with razor-sharp teeth while a hand is tattooing "AHS 10" on the tongue. The tenth season has received an estimated amount of $48 million in tax credits under the California Film Association's "Program 2.0" initiative. (Note: This amount represents the total qualified expenditures for the California Film & Television Tax Credit and excludes other non-qualifying costs.) On March 19, 2021, Murphy revealed the seasons's title to be Double Feature; it will encompass two different stories, "one by the sea, one by the sand." Later, on Instagram, Murphy referred to "Double Feature" as "Two seasons for the fans airing in one calendar year[...] So double the viewing pleasure. One set by the sea (this cast has already been announced). A second by the sand (that cast announcement coming)." On June 24, 2021, FX released the first promotional poster for the season, depicting a female humanoid creature french kissing an alien with a black pill resting on her tongue. On July 6, 2021, FX unveiled a promotional video, disclosing new footage from their upcoming slate of television. The promotional video unveiled footage of the characters portrayed by Sarah Paulson, Leslie Grossman, Lily Rabe, Finn Wittrock, Frances Conroy, and Evan Peters, respectively. On July 27, 2021, the first official teaser was released on social media, confirming the titles of the two parts as Red Tide and Death Valley, respectively. Red Tide spanned over the first six episodes and Death Valley over the last four episodes. On August 13, 2021, the official trailer for Red Tide was released.

=== Casting ===
I'm excited for him to be in my world because I think... I'm gonna want to do a lot of things with him if he wants to work, because I think he's fascinating and interesting, and I think he has a soul. There's both a lightness and a darkness with Macaulay Culkin that I'm attracted to.
—Murphy on Macaulay Culkin's casting

In November 2019, Murphy announced that some cast members from the first three seasons may return for the upcoming tenth season, saying, "[T]he people who helped build this show into what it is, who believed in it from the beginning, have been contacted and are interested. So, if you look at the iconography of the first three seasons, you can figure who I've gone to and who might be coming back." He also said that the tenth season would be "about reuniting fan-favorite actors to come back." Later that day, Paulson confirmed that she would be returning to the series for its 10th season in a lead role. On February 26, 2020, Murphy published a video in his Instagram account revealing that Grossman, Peters, Rabe, Wittrock, along with Kathy Bates, Billie Lourd, Adina Porter, Angelica Ross, and series newcomer Macaulay Culkin were cast in the 10th season. In a May 2020 interview with E! Online, Murphy revealed that Culkin accepted his role after Murphy told him the character's personality over the phone. He affirmed, "I told him he has crazy, erotic sex with Kathy Bates and does other things. And he paused and he goes, 'This sounds like the role I was born to play.' So, he signed up right then and there." On November 18, 2020, Murphy announced the casting of Spencer Novich. On February 5, 2021, Conroy was confirmed to return in season 10, replacing the role Bates was to play. On March 20, 2021, Murphy confirmed via Instagram that former series regular Denis O'Hare would return for the first time since Roanoke. On June 15, 2021, Neal McDonough joined the cast as a series regular.

=== Filming ===
It was initially reported that production was scheduled to resume filming in October 2020; however, Rabe confirmed to Digital Spy that filming for the season would start on December 2, 2020. On July 20, 2021, it was reported that production had been temporarily halted due to a positive COVID-19 case and potential exposure to the illness. Filming resumed a week later and concluded on September 27, 2021.

== Release ==
=== Broadcast ===
American Horror Story: Double Feature premiered with its first two episodes, "Cape Fear" and "Pale," which aired back-to-back on August 25, 2021, on FX. Subsequent episodes were broadcast weekly on Wednesdays at 10 p.m. ET/PT, with the season concluding on October 27, 2021. The ten-episode season was divided into two parts: Red Tide and Death Valley. Red Tide premiered on August 25, followed by Death Valley on September 29, one week after the conclusion of Red Tide. In Canada, the series premiered simultaneously with the United States, with episodes airing on FX at 10 p.m. ET/PT starting Wednesday, August 25.

=== Streaming ===
New episodes of American Horror Story were made available for streaming on Hulu the day after their FX premiere. Internationally, the series was made available to stream on Disney+.

JustWatch, a guide to streaming content with access to data from more than 20 million users around the world, calculated that American Horror Story was the fifth most-streamed television series in the U.S. from August 30 to September 5. Market research company Parrot Analytics, which looks at consumer engagement in consumer research, streaming, downloads, and on social media, reported that American Horror Story experienced an increase in demand in the United Kingdom following the start of its tenth season on August 25th. The demand rose from 22.4x the average in August to 23.2x in September.In the United States, the series was the most in-demand horror show from October 1 to 25, ranking ahead of Chucky, which placed second, and Hannibal, which placed third. For the full year, from January 1 through December 31, American Horror Story was the most in-demand horror series of 2021, according to Parrot Analytics.

Nielsen Media Research, which records streaming viewership on certain U.S. television screens, reported that American Horror Story: Double Feature garnered 308 million minutes of watch time, averaging 30.8 million minutes viewed per episode, between May 1, 2024, and August 31, 2026.

== Reception ==
=== Critical response ===
The review aggregator website Rotten Tomatoes reports an 80% approval rating, based on 61 reviews for the season, with an average rating of 9.00/10. The site's critical consensus reads: "Though its second tale is still a mystery, the first half of Double Feature proves a spine-tingling good time with terrific performances."

Liz Shannon Miller of Collider praised Double Feature for its concise and inventive storytelling, particularly complimenting the "Death Valley" segment as the most enjoyable part of the series. She highlighted the effectiveness of the split-season format, saying it allowed for a tighter, more focused narrative. Miller appreciated the fast pacing and the season's engaging alien conspiracy storyline, describing it as a fun and imaginative take on familiar themes. Despite some issues with the finale, she noted the season's bold nihilism and lauded its brevity for keeping it from overstaying its welcome. Riley Runnells of The Post described Double Feature as one of the strongest seasons in the anthology series, said Finn Wittrock and Lily Rabe deliver strong performances, along with notable contributions from Evan Peters and Frances Conroy. She highlighted Sarah Paulson’s portrayal of Tuberculosis Karen as raw, unglamorous, and both heartbreaking and terrifying. Runnells also complimented the writing for its polish and originality, specifically appreciating the fresh take on the vampire plot and the cinematic production style that elevated the season. Andy Swift of TVLine described Double Feature as a "return to form" for the long-running series, appreciating its chilling atmosphere and strong performances. He particularly highlighted Sarah Paulson's portrayal of Tuberculosis Karen as wonderfully disturbing and found Finn Wittrock and Lily Rabe to be standout performers. Swift also commended the premiere's fast-paced plot and unique approach to horror, noting that the mix of eccentric characters and suspenseful storyline made the two-part premiere especially engaging.

Kayla Cobb of Decider noted that Double Feature might mark a return to the show's horrifying roots, praising its frightening creatures and the performances, particularly from Finn Wittrock, Lily Rabe, Evan Peters, and Frances Conroy. She also highlighted Macaulay Culkin's portrayal of Mickey, appreciating his unapologetically sexualized yet smug character. While Cobb found the pacing slower than typical for American Horror Story, she acknowledged it as an intentional choice to build suspense and recommended streaming it for both its horror elements and standout performances. Matt Fowler of IGN described Double Feature as starting slowly with "Cape Fear," but gaining momentum significantly in "Pale." He complimented the series for its fresh take on vampire lore, incorporating a writer's block twist, and noted its effort to address previous pacing issues by presenting two distinct narratives. While Fowler found the opening episode lacking in excitement, he highlighted the engaging performances of Finn Wittrock, Lily Rabe, Evan Peters, and Frances Conroy within a familiar horror setup. Ron Hogan of Den of Geek rated Double Feature three out of five stars and appreciated the unexpected convergence of the two storylines. He highlighted Paulson's performance and the portrayal of Mamie Eisenhower as a pivotal character in the alien plot. While acknowledging some rushed elements and unanswered questions, Hogan found the blend of horror and conspiracy theories enjoyable. However, he felt the ending was abrupt, leaving several storylines unresolved.

American Horror Story season 10: Critical reception by episode
Season 10 (2020-2021): Percentage of positive critics' reviews tracked by the website Rotten Tomatoes

=== Ratings ===
Viewership and ratings per episode of American Horror Story: Double Feature
No.	Title	Air date	Rating/share (18–49)	Viewers (millions)	DVR (18–49)	DVR viewers (millions)	Total (18–49)	Total viewers (millions)
1	"Cape Fear"	August 25, 2021	0.4	0.93	TBD	TBD	TBD	TBD
2	"Pale"	August 25, 2021	0.2	0.58	TBD	TBD	TBD	TBD
3	"Thirst"	September 1, 2021	0.3	0.70	TBD	TBD	TBD	TBD
4	"Blood Buffet"	September 8, 2021	0.2	0.61	TBD	TBD	TBD	TBD
5	"Gaslight"	September 15, 2021	0.2	0.64	TBD	TBD	TBD	TBD
6	"Winter Kills"	September 22, 2021	0.3	0.73	TBD	TBD	TBD	TBD
7	"Take Me to Your Leader"	September 29, 2021	0.3	0.69	TBD	TBD	TBD	TBD
8	"Inside"	October 6, 2021	0.2	0.48	TBD	TBD	TBD	TBD
9	"Blue Moon"	October 13, 2021	0.2	0.58	0.2	0.59	0.4	1.17
10	"The Future Perfect"	October 20, 2021	0.2	0.58	0.2	0.64	0.4	1.22

== Accolades ==
Year	Association	Category	Nominee(s)	Result	Ref.
2021	Writers Guild of America Awards	Long Form – Original	Manny Coto, Brad Falchuk, Ryan Murphy, Kristen Reidel, Reilly Smith	Nominated	
2022	Make-Up Artists and Hair Stylists Guild Awards	Commercials and Music Videos: Best Makeup	Kerry Herta, Christina Kortum, Alex Perrone	Won	
2022	Primetime Creative Arts Emmy Awards	Outstanding Makeup (Non-Prosthetic)	Eryn Krueger Mekash, Kim Ayers, Mike Mekash, Ana Gabriela Quinonez	Nominated	
2022	Primetime Creative Arts Emmy Awards	Outstanding Sound Editing for a Limited/ Anthology Series, Movie or Special	Christian Buenaventura, Steve M. Stuhr, David Beadle, Tim Cleveland, Zheng Jia, Samuel Muñoz, Sean McGuire, Noel Vought	Nominated	
2022	Saturn Awards	Best Network or Cable Horror Television Series	American Horror Story: Double Feature	Nominated	
2022	Clio Awards	Television/Series: Special Shoot Spot/Promo: Horror	American Horror Story: Double Feature	Silver	
