= Robin Bartlett =

American actress

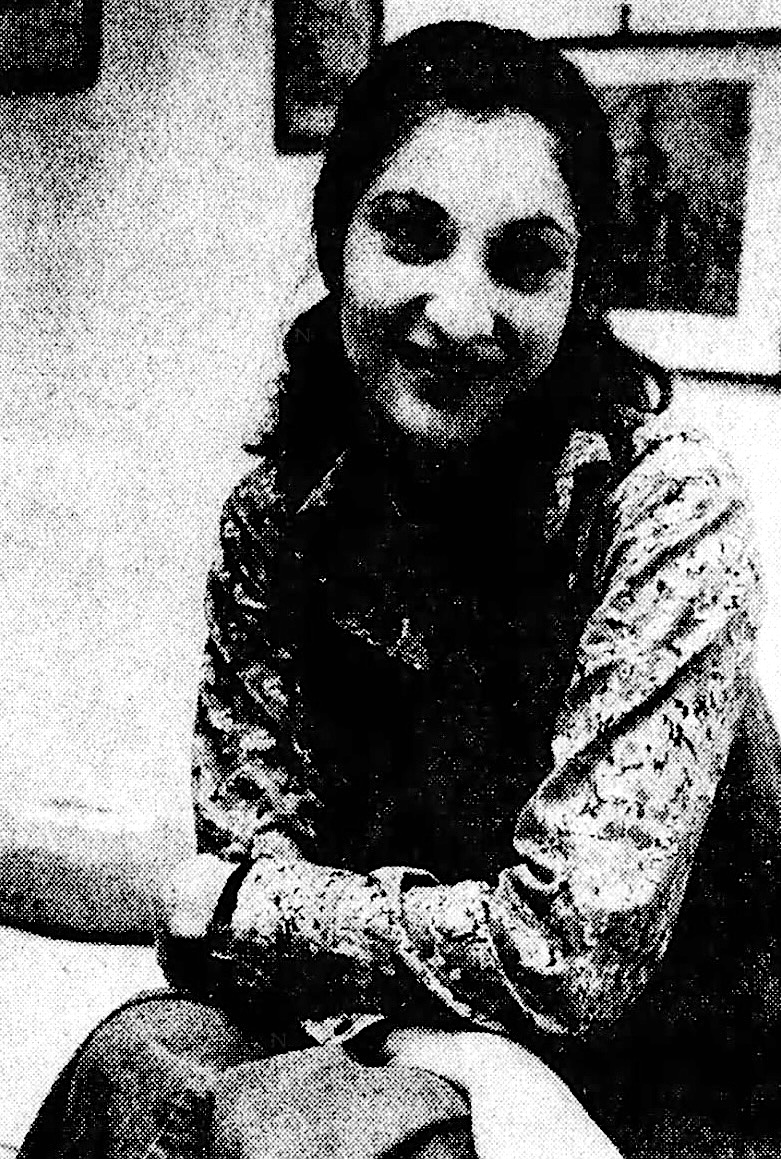
- Bartlett in 1977
- Born: April 22, 1951 (age 75); New York City, New York, U.S.
- Education: Boston University
- Occupation: Actress
- Years active: 1973–present
- Spouse: Alan Rosenberg (m. 1976; div. 1984) Terence Cannon (m. 1990)
- Children: 1

Robin Bartlett (born April 22, 1951) is an American film, stage, and television actress. A native of New York City, Bartlett began her career in theater after graduating from Boston University, appearing in a production of Richard III (1973). In 1975, she had a supporting role and was the understudy of the title character in Yentl on Broadway.

She made her feature film debut in Michael Cimino's epic Western Heaven's Gate (1980), and had supporting roles in numerous films over the following two decades, including Sophie's Choice (1982), Moonstruck (1987), Postcards from the Edge (1990), If Looks Could Kill (1991), Dangerous Minds (1995), and City of Angels (1998).

In television, she is known for her recurring roles in two NBC sitcoms: The Powers That Be and Mad About You. She also had recurring guest roles on the series Judging Amy (2000–2004) and Dragnet (2003–2004). In 2013, Bartlett appeared in two seasons of American Horror Story: Asylum and Coven. Bartlett's later film roles include supporting parts in the thriller Shutter Island (2010), the drama Inside Llewyn Davis (2013), as well as The Fabelmans (2022) and the independent horror film Shelby Oaks (2024).

== Early life ==
Bartlett was born April 22, 1951 in New York City and raised in Manhattan. Both of her parents were psychologists. Bartlett began acting as a child, first appearing in a stage production of The Servant of Two Masters at the World's fair in Queens.

She attended the High School of Performing Arts before earning a Bachelor of Fine Arts degree from Boston University in 1973. After college, Bartlett worked as a secretary while pursuing acting roles.

== Career ==
In 1973, with the Theatre Company of Boston, Bartlett appeared opposite Al Pacino and Lance Henriksen in a stage production of Richard III. She also performed with the Williamstown Theater Festival in Williamstown, Massachusetts. In 1975, Bartlett appeared on Broadway in Yentl, also serving as an understudy for the title role.

Bartlett made her feature film debut in the western Heaven's Gate (1980), and later had supporting roles in Sophie's Choice (1982), Baby Boom, and Moonstruck (both 1987). On stage, Bartlett starred in a 1986 Circle Repertory Theatre production of The Early Girl opposite Demi Moore, for which she earned Obie Award and Drama Desk Award nominations for her performance.

She also had minor roles in Woody Allen's Crimes and Misdemeanors (1989) and Alice (1990), and in Mike Nichols's Postcards from the Edge (1990) and Regarding Henry (1991). For her performance in the 1991 action comedy If Looks Could Kill, Bartlett was nominated for the Saturn Award for Best Supporting Actress.

She appeared in the short-lived series The Powers That Be. She played the sister of a filmmaker in Mad About You and a television producer in Sisters. She played a teacher in two films, Lean on Me and If Looks Could Kill. In addition, she played the dean of a private school in an episode ("The Ida Funkhouser Roadside Memorial") of the HBO series Curb Your Enthusiasm.

In June 2010, it was announced Barlett would play Hannah Pitt in Signature Theatre Company's 20th-anniversary production of Tony Kushner's Angels in America. She played Bridget Kearns in Shutter Island in 2010.

In 2013, she portrayed Miranda Crump in American Horror Story's second season, Asylum, and later that year returned for the third season, Coven, portraying Cecily Pembroke.

She starred in the 2014 film H., for which she was nominated for the Independent Spirit Award for Best Supporting Female in 2016.

In 2024, Bartlett starred in the independent supernatural horror film Shelby Oaks.

== Influences ==
Bartlett cited Michael Moriarty and Marlon Brando as influences on her acting. She also named Geraldine Page her favorite actress of all time, commenting: "I admired most her fluidity and incredible ability to respond to anything in a millisecond. And when she was subtle, she was very subtle."

== Personal life ==
Bartlett was married to actor Alan Rosenberg from 1976 until 1984. The couple met while performing together at the Williamstown Theater Festival in the 1970s. In 1990, she married fiction writer Terence Cannon, with whom she has one son, Eamon, born in 1987. Beginning in 1984, Bartlett and Cannon resided in Hoboken, New Jersey.

== Filmography ==
=== Film ===
Key
†	Denotes works that have not yet been released

Year	Title	Role	Notes	Ref.
1980	Heaven's Gate	Mrs. Lezak		
1980	Playing for Time	Etalina	Television film	
1981	Skokie	JDL Girl	Television film	
1982	Sophie's Choice	Lillian Grossman		
1987	Baby Boom	Yuppie Wife		
1987	Moonstruck	Barbara		
1989	Lean on Me	Mrs. Elliot		
1989	See You in the Morning	Group Therapy Patient		
1989	Crimes and Misdemeanors	Wedding Guest		
1990	Postcards from the Edge	Aretha		
1990	Alice	Nina		
1991	If Looks Could Kill	Patricia Grober		
1991	Regarding Henry	Phyllis		
1991	Deceived	Charlotte		
1993	12:01	Anne Jackson	Television film	
1995	Dangerous Minds	Mrs. Carla Nichols		
1997	Honey, We Shrunk Ourselves	Patti Szalinski		
1998	City of Angels	Anne		
2005	The Dying Gaul	Bella		
2010	Shutter Island	Bridget Kearns		
2013	Inside Llewyn Davis	Lillian Gorfein		
2014	H.	Helen		
2015	Chronic	Martha		
2017	The Glass Castle	Erma		
2018	Josie	Martha		
2019	Immortal	Mary		
2021	The Seventh Day	Helen		
2021	Land of Dreams	Jackie		
2022	The Fabelmans	Tina Schildkraut		
2023	The Last Stop in Yuma County	Earline		
2024	Shelby Oaks	Norma Miles		

=== Television ===
Year	Title	Role	Notes	Ref.
1979	Shirley	Sarah	Episode: "A Play on Words"	
1981	Ryan's Hope	Judy Prince	Episode: "#1.1619"	
1988	Spenser: For Hire	Mrs. Drake	Episode: "To the End of the Line"	
1989	Miami Vice	Rhoda King	Episode: "The Cell Within"	
1992	Coach	Sarah	Episode: "If That's Opportunity, Don't Answer"	
1992–1993	The Powers That Be	Sophie Lipkin	20 episodes	
1993	Fallen Angels	Jean Medill	Episode: "Murder, Obliquely"	
1993	It Had to Be You	Eve Parkin	6 episodes	
1994–1999	Mad About You	Debbie Buchman	29 episodes	
2000–2004	Judging Amy	Atty. Roberta Orr	3 episodes	
2000	Zoe, Duncan, Jack and Jane	Professor Norris	Episode: "I Don't Feel So Good"	
2000	Touched by an Angel	Toni	Episode: "Quality Time"	
2000	Bull	Rose Wright	Episode: "To Have and to Hold"	
2001	Danny	Unknown	Episode: "Forget About Your Boss"	
2002	The West Wing	Susan Thomas	Episode: "The Red Mass"	
2003	The Agency	Nili Demsky	Episode: "Unholy Alliances"	
2003–2004	Dragnet	Donna Bostick	6 episodes	
2004	Medical Investigation	Dr. Salgado	Episode: "Team"	
2004	NYPD Blue	Evelyn Winker	Episode: "I Love My Wives, But Oh You Kid"	
2005	American Dad!	Clara	Episode: "Stan Knows Best" (voice)	
2005	The Closer	Leah Rainey	Episode: "Flashpoint"	
2005	Nip/Tuck	Meredith Forsythe	Episode: "KiKi"	
2006	Justice	Regina Stack	Episode: "Death Spiral"	
2007	The Singles Table	Mrs. Braunstein	Episode: "The Work Dinner"	
2007	Curb Your Enthusiasm	Dean	Episode: "The Ida Funkhouser Roadside Memorial"	
2010	CSI: Miami	Stephanie Hollister	Episode: "Backfire"	
2013	American Horror Story: Asylum	Miranda Crump	Episode: "Continuum"	
2013	American Horror Story: Coven	Cecily Pembroke	3 episodes	
2014	Comedy Bang! Bang!	Hot Dog Lady	Episode: "Nick Offerman Wears a Green Flannel Shirt & Brown Boots"	
2015	Battle Creek	Judge Warren	Episode: "The Hand-Off"	
2015	Brooklyn Nine-Nine	Miss Miriam	Episode: "The Mattress"	
2016	Vice Principals	Mrs. Leblanc	Episode: "The Foundation of Learning"	
2021	The Shrink Next Door	Cathy	Miniseries; 5 episodes	

== Theatre ==
Year	Title	Role	Location	Ref.
1973	Richard III	Duke of York	Theatre Company of Boston	
1975	Yentl	Avram / Raizeleh	Eugene O'Neill Theatre	
1977	Two for the Seesaw	Gittel Mosca	Asolo Repertory Theatre	
1978	Fathers and Sons		The Public Theater	
1981–1982	No End of Blame	Stella / Dr. Glasson	Manhattan Theatre Club	
1982	The World of Sholom Aleichem	2nd Angel / The Angel Rochele	Rialto Theatre	
1983	The Philanthropist	Araminta	Manhattan Theatre Club	
1983	The Seagull	Masha	The American Place Theatre	
1984	Found a Peanut	Melody	The Public Theater	
1984	Fen	Mrs. Hassett / Becky	The Public Theater	
1985	Life and Limb	Doina	Playwrights Horizons	
1986	The Early Girl	Jean	Circle Repertory Theatre	
1986	Cheapside	Mary Frith	Roundabout Theatre	
1988	Reckless	Rachel	Circle Repertory Theatre	
1986	Cheapside	Mary Frith	Roundabout Theatre	
1999	Jolly	Jolly	Geffen Playhouse	
2001–2002	Everett Beekin	Sophie / Celia	Mitzi E. Newhouse Theater	
2005	Singing Forest	Loe Rieman	Long Wharf Theatre	
2007	Prelude to a Kiss	Mrs. Boyle	American Airlines Theatre	
2010	Angels in America	Hannah Pitt	Signature Theatre Company	
2019	The Thin Place	Linda	Actors Theatre of Louisville	

== Accolades ==
Award/association	Year	Category	Nominated work	Result	Ref.
Drama Desk Awards	1987	Outstanding Actress in a Play	The Early Girl	Nominated	
Drama Desk Awards	1989	Outstanding Actress in a Play	Reckless	Nominated	
Independent Spirit Awards	2016	Best Supporting Female	H.	Nominated	
Obie Awards	1987	Distinguished Performance by an Actress	The Early Girl	Nominated	
Outer Critics Circle Awards	2007	Outstanding Actress in a Play	Prelude to a Kiss	Nominated	
Saturn Awards	1992	Best Supporting Actress	If Looks Could Kill	Nominated	
Screen Actors Guild Awards	1998	Outstanding Performance by an Ensemble in a Comedy Series	Mad About You	Nominated	
