= American Horror Story: NYC =

Eleventh season of American Horror Story

- Season 11
- Promotional poster
- Showrunner: Ryan Murphy
- Starring: Russell Tovey; Joe Mantello; Billie Lourd; Denis O'Hare; Charlie Carver; Leslie Grossman; Sandra Bernhard; Isaac Powell; Zachary Quinto; Patti LuPone
- No. of episodes: 10

Release
- Original network: FX
- Original release: October 19 – November 16, 2022

Season chronology
- ← Previous; Double Feature Next → Delicate

The eleventh season of the American horror anthology television series American Horror Story, subtitled NYC, takes place in 1980s New York City, and focuses on a string of killings involving gay men and the emergence of a new virus. The ensemble cast includes Russell Tovey, Joe Mantello, Billie Lourd, Denis O'Hare, Charlie Carver, Leslie Grossman, Sandra Bernhard, Isaac Cole Powell, Zachary Quinto, and Patti LuPone, with all returning from previous seasons, except newcomers Tovey, Mantello, and Carver.

Created by Ryan Murphy and Brad Falchuk for the cable network FX, the series is produced by 20th Television. NYC was broadcast between October 19 to November 16, 2022, consisting of 10 episodes. The subtitle was announced in September 2022. The season received positive reviews from critics, but became the first season of the show not to be nominated for any Primetime Emmy Awards.

This season saw the final involvement of executive producer Manny Coto, who died on July 9, 2023. The season has a connection to Asylum, with the recurring character the Angel of Death.

== Cast and characters ==
NYC main cast

Russell Tovey

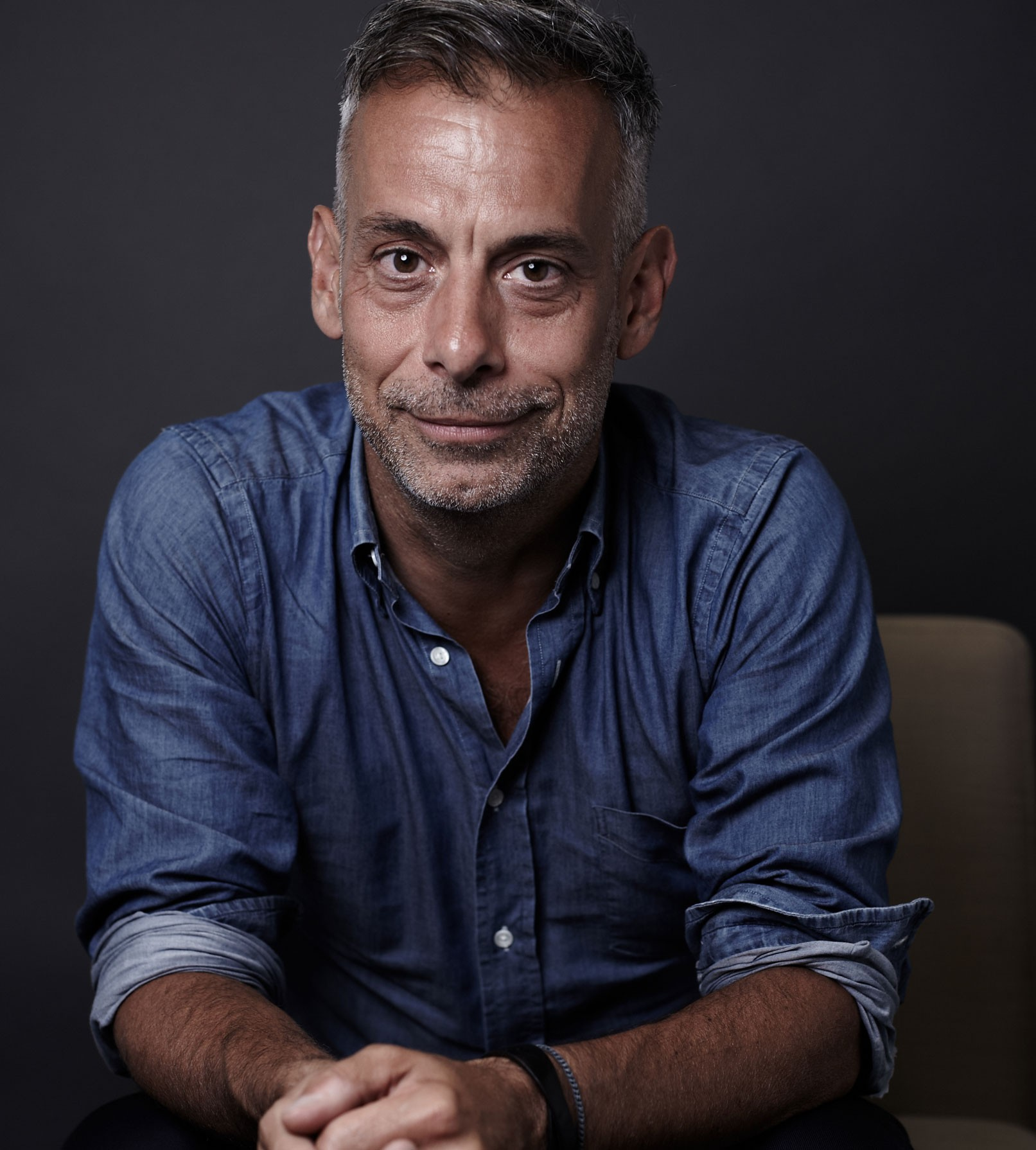
Joe Mantello

Billie Lourd

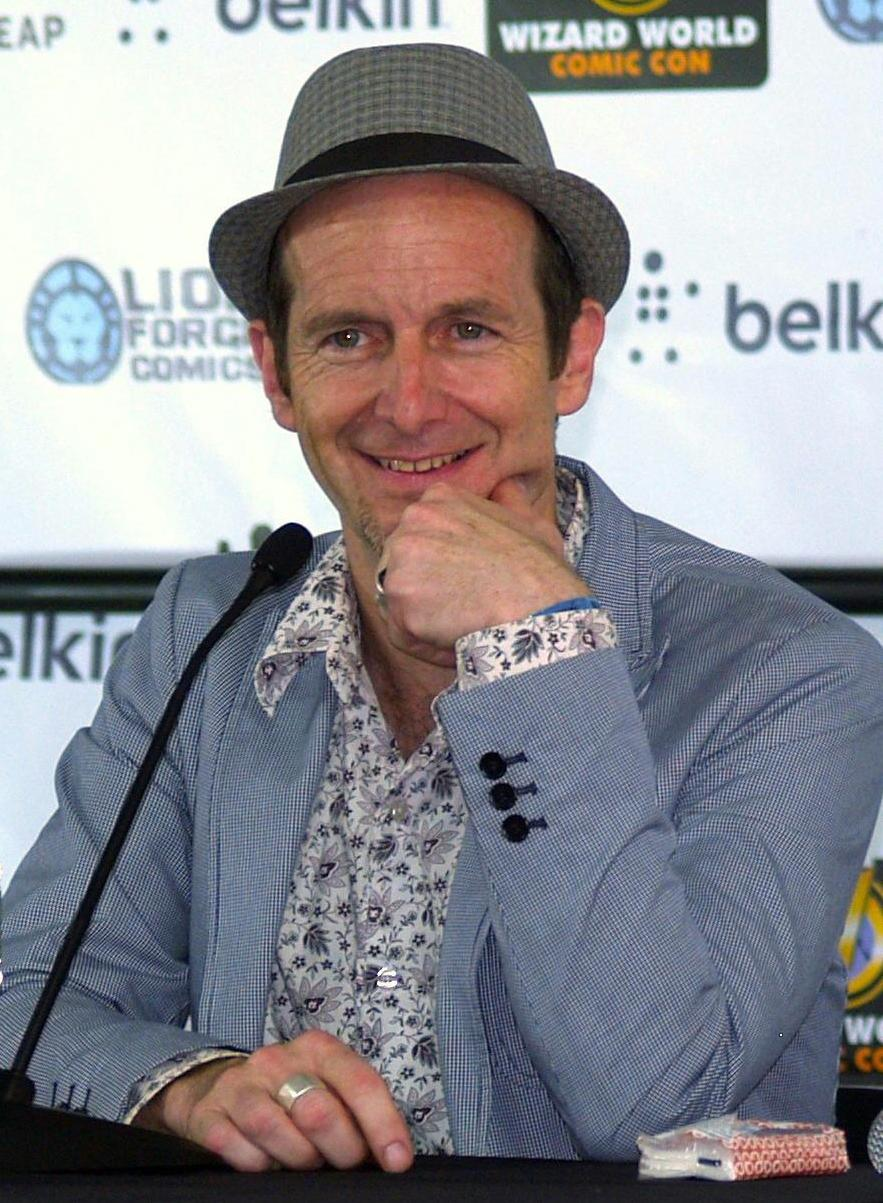
Denis O'Hare

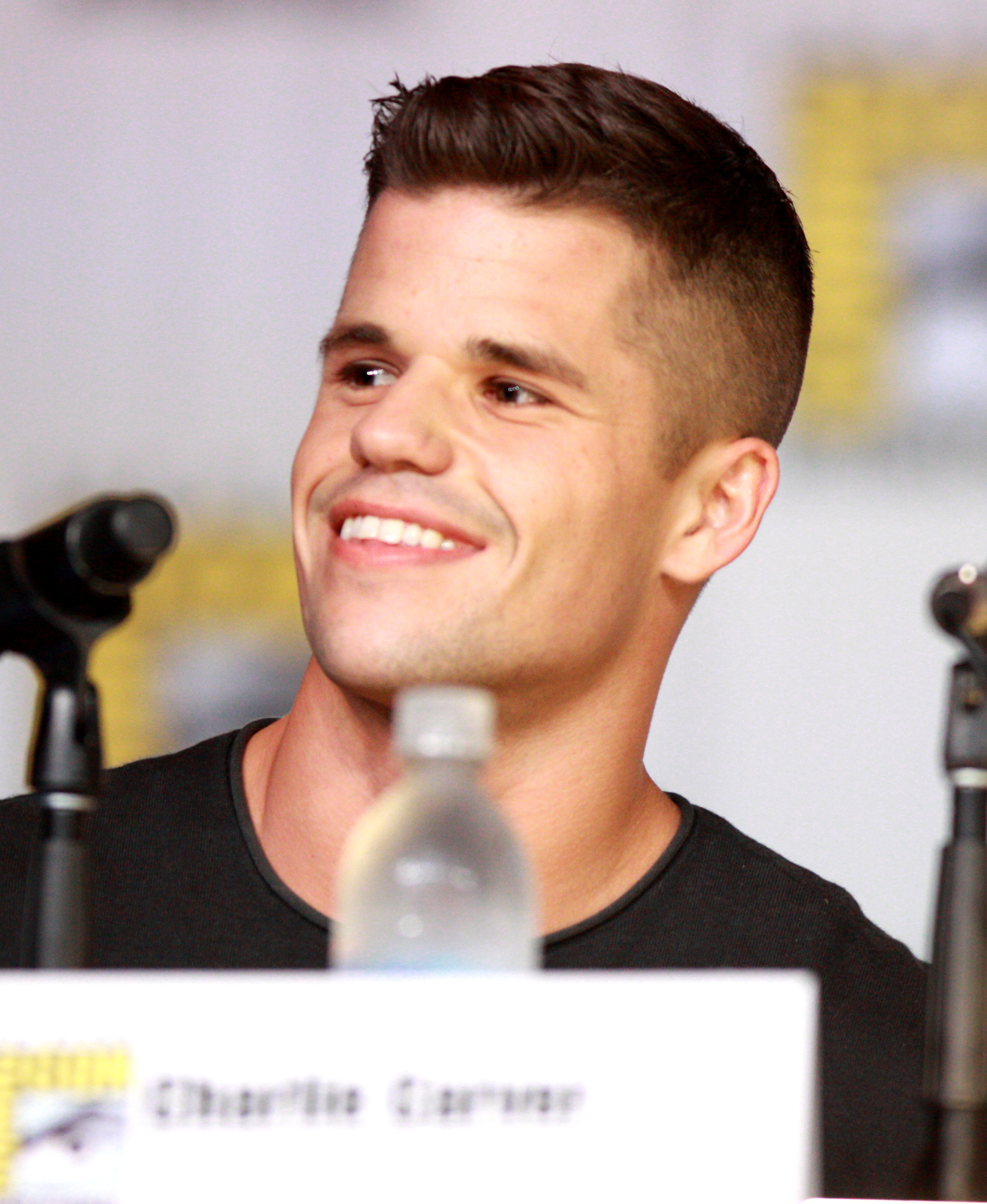
Charlie Carver

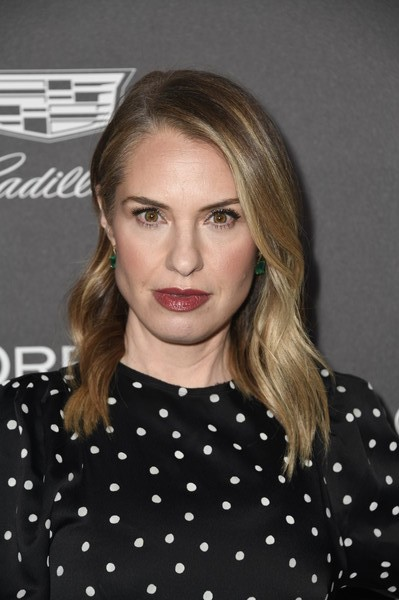
Leslie Grossman

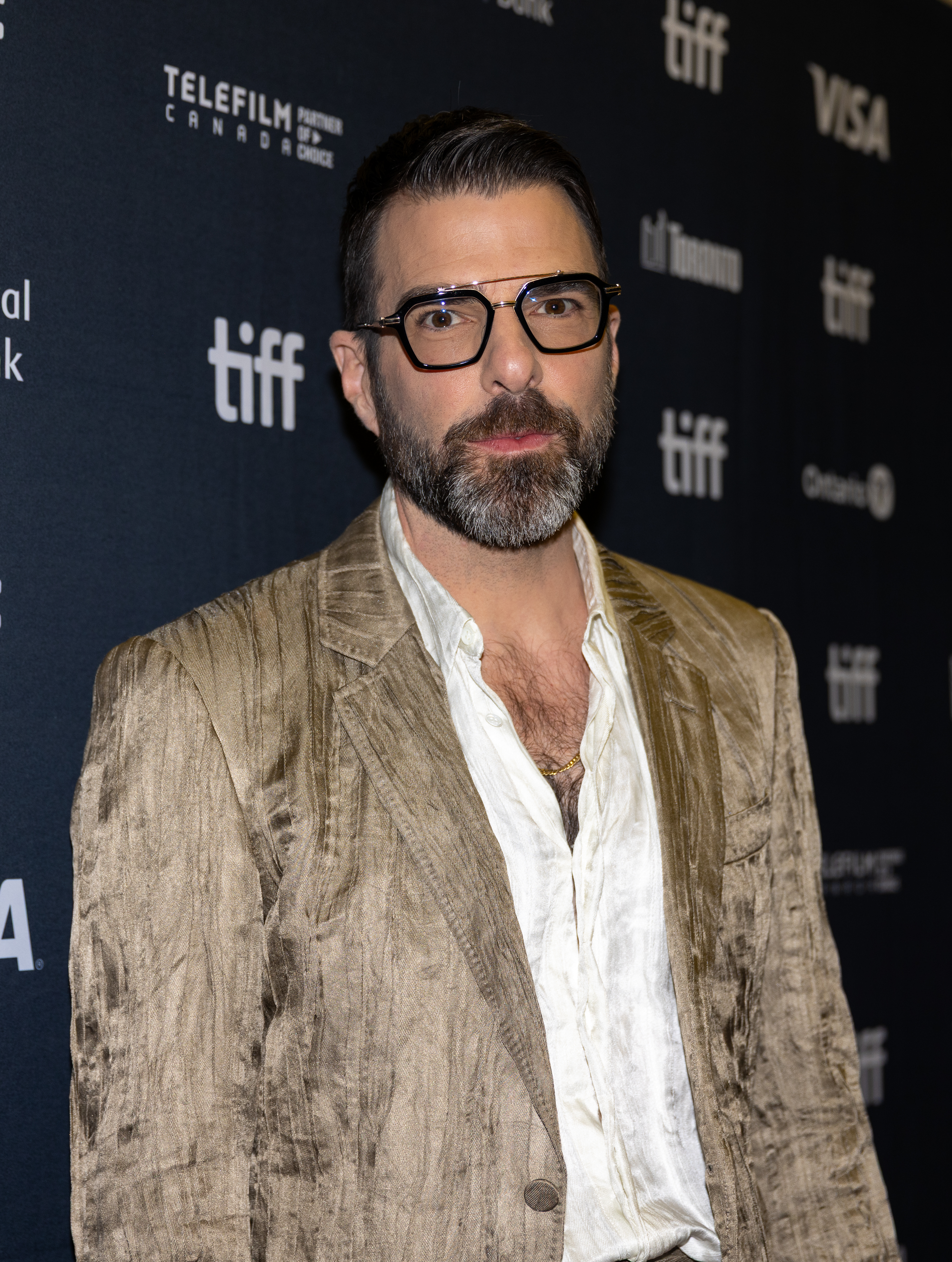
Zachary Quinto

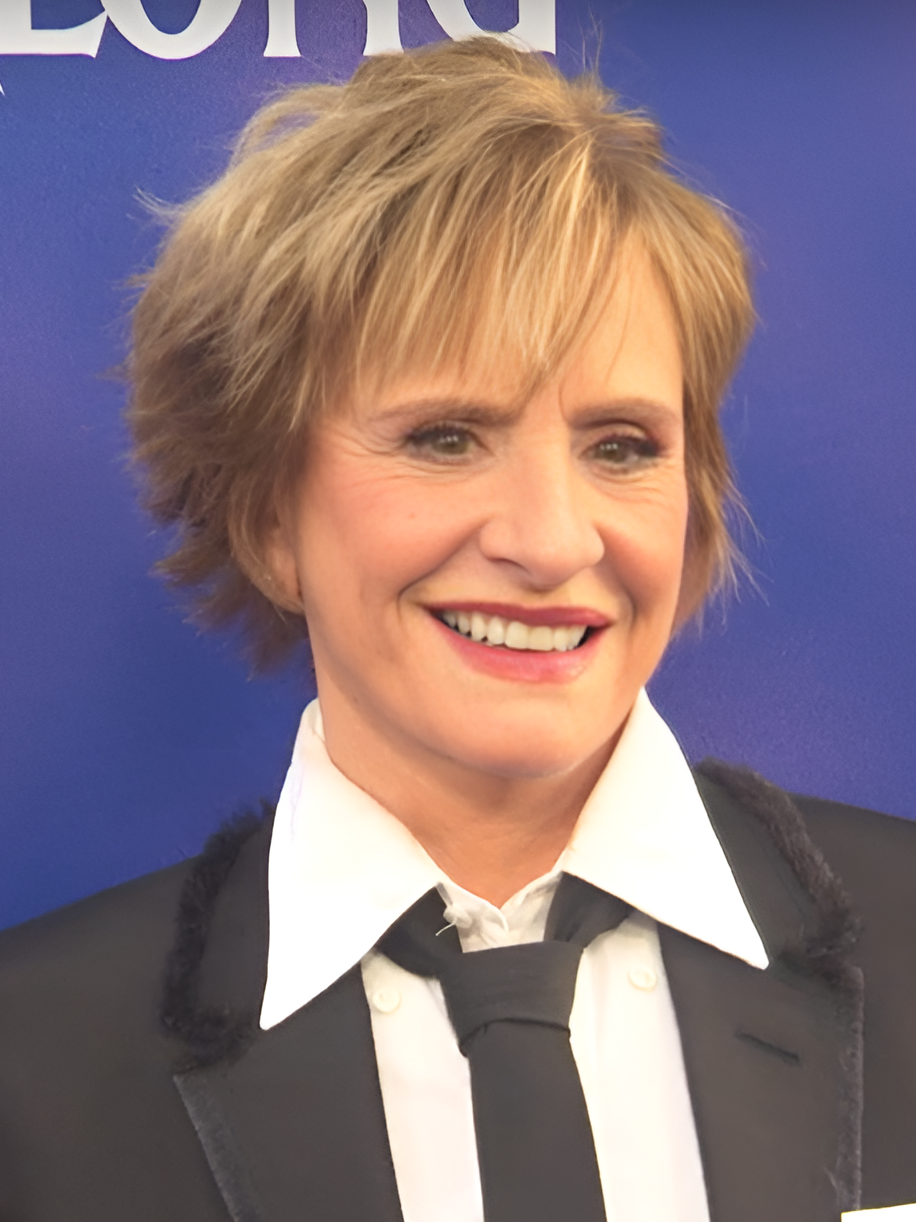
Patti LuPone

=== Main ===
- Russell Tovey as Detective Patrick Read
- Joe Mantello as Gino Barelli
- Billie Lourd as Dr. Hannah Wells
- Denis O'Hare as Henry Grant
- Charlie Carver as Adam Carpenter
- Leslie Grossman as Barbara Read
- Sandra Bernhard as Fran Levinsky
- Isaac Powell as Theo Graves (Note: The character is loosely based on the life, work, and death of NYC erotic photographer, Robert Mapplethorpe)
- Zachary Quinto as Sam Jones (Note: The character is loosely based on the life, career, and death of NYC art curator, Sam Wagstaff)
- Patti LuPone as Kathy Pizazz

=== Recurring ===
- Jeff Hiller as Mr. Gideon Whitely
- Kyle Beltran as Morris Delgado
- Clara McGregor as KK
- Quei Tann as Lita Steadman
- Kal Penn as Chief of Detectives Mac Marzara
- Rebecca Dayan as Alana Delarue
- Casey Thomas Brown as Hans Henkes
- Hale Appleman as Daniel Kanowicz
- Gideon Glick as Cameron Dietrich
- Matthew William Bishop as Big Daddy

=== Guest ===
- Taylor Bloom as Stewart Bowers
- Sis as Dunaway
- Alexandre Bagot as Tom
- Ralph Adriel Johnson as Frankie Del Rios

== Episodes ==
No. overall	No. in season	Title	Directed by	Written by	Original release date	Prod. code	US viewers (millions)
114	1	"Something's Coming"	John J. Gray	Ryan Murphy & Brad Falchuk	October 19, 2022	BATS01	0.384
In 1981, local reporter for the New York Native Gino Barelli presses his boyfriend Detective Patrick Read for information regarding a string of killings targeting gay men. Patrick refuses to be Gino's source out of fear of being outed to the police force. Later, at a bar Gino believes the killer frequents, surrealist art collector Henry tells Gino about a suspicious regular with a penchant for Mai Tais. Afterwards, Gino is drugged and captured by an unknown assailant. Meanwhile, Adam Carpenter's roommate disappears in Central Park and a man in leather stalks him. Adam finds a photo of the man and seeks out the photographer, Theo Graves. Theo assures Adam that the man in the photo, Big Daddy, has been dead for two years. On Fire Island, in an effort to contain a new virus discovered by Dr. Hannah Wells, state troopers shoot and kill a herd of deer.
115	2	"Thank You for Your Service"	Max Winkler	Ned Martel & Charlie Carver & Manny Coto	October 19, 2022	BATS02	0.276
Gino's captor, Mr. Whitely, frees him after noticing Gino's Marine tattoo. The next day, Mr. Whitely visits Dr. Wells' office in distress about an incurable rash. Gino tells Adam about his capture and stresses that the police will not help them. Adam convinces him to set up a phone number for people to call with tips. Concerned about the murders, Patrick's ex-wife Barbara presents Gino a box of BDSM gear Patrick kept hidden. The police harass Adam for flyers deriding the force for inaction. That night, Adam has ominous experiences on the subway and at a warehouse party. Gino and Patrick go to a leather bar to look out for the killer. Mr. Whitely orders a man a Mai Tai, stabs him in the neck, and vanishes. Newly hired Native writer Fran meets with Dr. Wells and asserts that the U.S. government is responsible for the virus. Theo's boyfriend, wealthy erotic art curator Sam Jones, holds a young man captive in a cage. The police discover body parts of victims in an alleyway strung up on meat hooks.
116	3	"Smoke Signals"	John J. Gray	Brad Falchuk & Manny Coto	October 26, 2022	BATS03	0.378
Fran elaborates, claiming the virus is a biological weapon. Sam's prisoner, Stewart, escapes. Patrick questions Sam, who insists everything was consensual. A call from Mr. Whitely leads Patrick to a warehouse party. There, he follows a harnessed man into a backroom and whips him. Adam and Theo go on a date at the Ascension Club, where Adam insists Big Daddy is still alive. Whitely orders Adam a Mai Tai before Big Daddy seals the bar doors shut and sets the club ablaze with a Molotov cocktail. Dr. Wells takes blood from Adam and Whitely for testing. Gino and Patrick chase Whitely around the hospital. Whitely restrains Gino in the morgue and locks him in a freezing drawer.
117	4	"Black Out"	Jennifer Lynch	Ned Martel & Charlie Carver	October 26, 2022	BATS04	0.279
Power grid failures cause black outs across the city. Patrick rescues Gino from the morgue. Gino implores Kathy, the proprietor of a local bathhouse, to give a statement regarding the murders to the Native. Hans, the emcee of the warehouse parties, is found dead by his friend Daniel. Theo breaks up with Sam for Adam. Sam intercepts Adam on the street and picks him up for a ride. He declares that Theo will grow bored of him. Patrick comes out to Captain Marzara. Fearing he may be the killer, Barbara shows Gino Patrick's leather mask. Whitely calls Patrick at the station, identifying him by name. In Central Park, Big Daddy hunts Patrick with a chain mace. At a black out warehouse party, Adam and Daniel encourage others to organize. Pleading for the truth, Gino confronts Patrick with the mask and passes out. Daniel and a friend follow Whitely into his apartment complex. The three are in an elevator when the power goes out and Whitely brandishes a knife.
118	5	"Bad Fortune"	Paris Barclay	Our Lady J & Jennifer Salt	November 2, 2022	BATS05	0.265
Kathy hires Fran to read fortunes at her tarot shop. Hannah, Adam and Theo visit the shop and all three are dealt the death card. Gino visits and reads his own fortune. Shachath, the Angel of Death, appears and encourages him to kiss her. In the meantime, Hannah visits the doctor and discovers her red blood cell count is low. She confides to Adam that he and the other victims of the Ascension Club fire also have low red blood cell counts. Big Daddy attacks Patrick in Barbara's apartment and later strangles Barbara to death. Mr. Whitely unveils his ultimate plan: displaying a body made out of different victims at the upcoming pride parade to show his contempt and disdain for what he feels is a false sense of community and fellowship within the gay community.
119	6	"The Body"	John J. Gray	Brad Falchuk & Manny Coto & Our Lady J	November 2, 2022	BATS06	0.191
Two men find a body wearing a leather hood on a beach on Fire Island and call Patrick. Henry accosts Gino in his apartment and threatens him, claiming Native articles on the murders have hindered local businesses. Gino spots Patrick getting into a car with Sam. Gino and Henry follow Patrick and Sam to Fire Island, where Patrick reveals that he met Sam in 1979. They had a threesome with a young man who ended up suffocating. Sam called Henry to dispose of the body for them. Henry brought along Mr. Whitely to dismember the corpse. Patrick deduces that Henry's associate must be the Mai Tai killer, remarking upon the precision of the cuts in comparison to the killer's victims. Henry and Gino lure Whitely to a bar with a job proposition. Inside, Henry follows Whitely into the bathroom and Whitely stabs him in the neck with a sedative. Gino calls Patrick asking for help.
120	7	"The Sentinel"	Paris Barclay	Our Lady J & Manny Coto	November 9, 2022	BATS07	0.274
Gino and Patrick enter Whitely's place, a meat processing facility. Whitely immediately knocks them out and handcuffs them to tables. Henry manages to slip one hand out. He admits to being aware that Whitely was the killer before sawing off his other hand to free Gino. Gino frees Patrick, and Whitely desperately attempts to defend his motives before Patrick shoots him in the head. Having finally caught the Mai Tai killer, Patrick denounces the NYPD in a newspaper article and quits the force. He also begins seeing visions of Barbara. Feeling increasingly ill, Hannah asks her mother if she can stay with her. Adam notes to Gino that there must still be a killer at large, considering Whitely only killed seven people.
121	8	"Fire Island"	Jennifer Lynch	Ned Martel & Charlie Carver & Our Lady J	November 9, 2022	BATS08	0.152
On a boat en route to Fire Island, Adam is concerned about Theo being sick. On the island, Patrick dismisses Gino's concerns about abnormal growths on both of their bodies. He later has another vision of Barbara. Henry confesses to Gino that he is in love with him. Fran and her friends manage to fend off Big Daddy. Patrick shoots Big Daddy in the head after he attacks Gino and Adam, but he disappears. Sam drugs Theo's drink and ties him up in the woods to be taken advantage of by Henry; however, Big Daddy scares Henry off and the souls of gay victims lovingly embrace Theo.
122	9	"Requiem 1981/1987"	Our Lady J	Our Lady J	November 16, 2022	BATS09	0.277
123	10	"Requiem 1981/1987"	Jennifer Lynch	Ned Martel & Charlie Carver	November 16, 2022	BATS10	0.191
In 1981, at Theo's funeral, Sam faints and experiences a series of visions. First, he is treated by a nurse who appears to him as Billy. Then a doctor, appearing as Theo, tells him he is dying of pneumonia. Guided by Theo, Sam discovers the other men (Danny and Stewart) they were with; they are both dying. They find Sam in his room, deteriorated, convulsing and dying. Henry guides Sam through further visions: being in a cage with Henry being his tormentor, then allowing him to torment Sam's father, Sam's first boss, and Sam himself. On a beach, Sam unmasks Big Daddy to find a beautiful man and they embrace. Henry spreads Sam's ashes on the beach. In 1987, Patrick's condition worsens and is cared for by Gino. At the hospital, a doctor tells him his blindness is irreversible. Patrick is guided by Barbara through a series of visions: in 1980, the moment where Patrick met Gino while investigating a death; in 1977, a kiss between Patrick and his former police partner Steve is discovered by Mulcahey, prompting Patrick to reject him in order to maintain his cover; Patrick carving up a corpse under Whitely's supervision; and a childhood memory of Patrick being verbally abused by his homophobic father. In the present, Patrick dies with Gino beside him and a vision of Kathy crooning at his bedside with Barbara and Big Daddy nearby. In 1981, Adam arrives at Hannah's apartment, just as her dead body is being taken away. He listens to her tape recordings in order to figure out what happened. He hears her coughing violently, leading him to erroneously conclude that she was attacked, which is disputed by the coroner. Another recording reveals the virus can be sexually transmitted. Adam remembers an unprotected sexual encounter in the park with another man and realizes that he had transmitted the virus to Hannah when she was inseminated with his sperm. He begins posting flyers encouraging condom use. He visits Kathy at the bathhouse, where she reveals she is no longer going to perform, realizing it is no longer safe. She tells Adam to enjoy his life. In 1987, Gino prepares to give a eulogy at Patrick's funeral, with their friends and Patrick's family in attendance. Afterwards, Gino joins ACT UP and continues to live with the virus; a montage follows (set to "Radioactivity" by Kraftwerk) of Gino avoiding Big Daddy (representing the virus) as he slaughters (infects) other members of the gay community. Ultimately, Gino dies in 1991. The episode ends as Adam is about to give a eulogy at Gino's funeral.

== Production ==
=== Development ===
On January 9, 2020, American Horror Story was renewed for up to a thirteenth season. In February 2022, FX chairman John Landgraf stated that the eleventh season would feature only one story, unlike Double Feature, though it would take place "in different timelines." On September 29, 2022, the official title of the season was revealed to be NYC and that the season would premiere on October 19, 2022. On October 6, 2022, a teaser trailer for the season was released on the show's social media pages.

=== Casting ===
Ahead of any official cast announcements, Billie Lourd, Charlie Carver, Isaac Cole Powell, and Sandra Bernhard were seen filming on set. Additionally, Zachary Quinto, Patti LuPone, and Joe Mantello were reported to be appearing in the season. On August 30, 2022, series veteran Denis O'Hare confirmed his appearance on Twitter. Leslie Grossman, Russell Tovey, Rebecca Dayan, Kal Penn and Gideon Glick also appeared in the season.

=== Filming ===
Filming officially began in New York on June 14, 2022, and concluded on October 28, 2022.

== Release ==
=== Broadcast ===
American Horror Story: NYC premiered on October 19, 2022, on FX. For the first time in the series' history, two episodes aired each week instead of one. In Canada, the season premiered simultaneously with the United States, airing on FX at 10 p.m. ET/PT starting Wednesday, October 19.

=== Streaming ===
New episodes of American Horror Story were made available for streaming on Hulu the day after their FX premiere. Beginning October 20, the first two episodes of the new season were released on Hulu. Internationally, the series was made available to stream on Disney+.

Whip Media, which tracks viewership data for the more than 21 million worldwide users of its TV Time app, announced that American Horror Story was the fifth most-anticipated returning television series of October 2022. The streaming aggregator Reelgood, which tracks real-time data from 5 million U.S. users for original and acquired content across SVOD and AVOD services, said that it ranked as the tenth most-streamed program during the week ending October 26. JustWatch, a guide to streaming content with access to data from more than 20 million users around the world, reported that American Horror Story was the fifth most-streamed television show in the United States from October 24–30, and it remained in the top ten from October 31 to November 13. Market research company Parrot Analytics, which looks at consumer engagement in consumer research, streaming, downloads, and on social media, reported that American Horror Story was the most in-demand horror series in the U.S. during September 2022, with 26.4 times the average series demand. The series ranked ahead of other horror titles, including Hannibal, which placed second, and Chucky, which placed third. American Horror Story subsequently became one of the most in-demand horror series of 2022, according to Parrot Analytic.

Nielsen Media Research, which records streaming viewership on certain U.S. television screens, reported that American Horror Story: NYC garnered 235 million minutes of watch time, averaging 23.5 million minutes viewed per episode, between May 1, 2024, and August 31, 2026.

== Reception ==
=== Critical response ===
The review aggregator website Rotten Tomatoes reports a 71% approval rating, based on 7 reviews for the season, with an average rating of 6.80/10.

Emma Stefansky of The Daily Beast stated, "There is an air of unknown doom that hangs about the show even in its first episodes, with people repeatedly mentioning a feeling of ominousness permeating the city, muttering things like, 'Something dark is coming.' Isn't it always? AHS: NYC has all the Murphy-esque signatures, and more: It's sexy, it's salacious, and it's subversive—not least because of the era and the community in which it's set. Like most seasons of this show, NYC starts strong, though it's difficult at this point to say exactly what's going on. Who is the leather mask daddy with a murderous streak? Is this perhaps an origin story for the rubber man ghost from all the way back in Season 1? As a horror-tinged dramatization of the oppression that urban marginalized communities faced in Reagan's America, it works, so far." Kayla Cobb of Decider wrote, "American Horror Story: NYC has been the most realistic this series has ever been. Instead of witches, ghosts, and vampires, this installment is all about serial killers and incompetent cops. But just because this show has a newfound dedication to realism, that doesn't mean there weren't some over-the-top flourishes."

Magdalene Taylor of Vulture said, "For now, we can rely on one thing about this season: It will be sexy. AHS almost always is, but the queer '80s New York City setting offers far more creative and erotic fodder than, say, the dilapidated North Carolina colonial farmhouse of AHS: Roanoke. The leather, the coke, the soundtrack — even if the plot this season fails us, at least we'll be fed aesthetically. There are not yet any ghosts, vampires, witches, or demons, but if this season is entirely grounded in reality, it's at least a gritty and exciting one to see. Though this might not be as big of a hit as Dahmer or The Watcher, AHS fans likely won't be starved of the campy theatricalism we've come to adore." Ron Hogan of Den of Geek gave American Horror Story: NYC a grade of 4 out of 5 stars, asserting, "Now that sort of wild conspiracy theory feels more like the AHS I'm used to. People on the hunt for a serial killer is all well and good, and can be very fun, but it wouldn't be Ryan Murphy and Brad Falchuk without something crazier than shirtless hunks in cages to really liven things up. NYC might be more David Fincher's Zodiac than a take on William Lustig's Maniac for the moment, but there's always that undercurrent of weirdness to everything American Horror Story does that's just waiting to move from a subplot to the main feature."

=== Ratings ===
Timeslot (ET)	Episodes	First aired		Last aired		TV season	Avg. viewers (millions)	Avg. 18–49 rating
Timeslot (ET)	Episodes	Date	Viewers (millions)	Date	Viewers (millions)	TV season	Avg. viewers (millions)	Avg. 18–49 rating
Wednesday 10:00 p.m.	10	October 19, 2022	0.38	November 16, 2022	0.19	2022–23	0.27	0.1

American Horror Story episodes recorded total viewership (P2+) ranging from 265,000 to 384,000 viewers between October 19 and November 16, 2022. The highest audience was on October 19, with 384,000 viewers and a 0.12% rating. Among adults aged 18–49, viewership ranged from 104,400 to 169,600, with the highest rating of 0.13% also on October 19. In the 25–54 demographic, viewership peaked at 194,700 on October 26, with a 0.16% rating. Overall ratings for the total audience remained between 0.08% and 0.12% during this period.

=== Accolades ===
Year	Award	Category	Nominee(s)	Result	Ref,
2023	Clio Awards	Key Art – Domestic One-Sheet	American Horror Story: NYC	Bronze	
2023	Clio Awards	Video Promo – Clip Based	American Horror Story: NYC	Bronze	
2023	GLAAD Media Award	Outstanding Limited or Anthology Series	American Horror Story: NYC	Nominated	
2023	Queerties	TV Drama	American Horror Story: NYC	Nominated	

== See also ==
- Grotesquerie
- Paul Bateson
- Richard Rogers
