= Rebecca Dayan =

French actress (born 1984)

- Born: 17 April 1984 (age 42); French Riviera
- Occupations: Actress; model

Rebecca Dayan ([da.jɔn]; born 17 April 1984) is a French actress, model, artist, and activist. After training in fine arts, Dayan began her career in fashion and theatre in Paris. She then moved to New York City where she took up screen acting. Following several small roles, she returned to painting, and had her first large role in 2017 film Novitiate. She is best known for portraying Elsa Peretti in the 2021 Netflix miniseries Halston.

== Early life ==
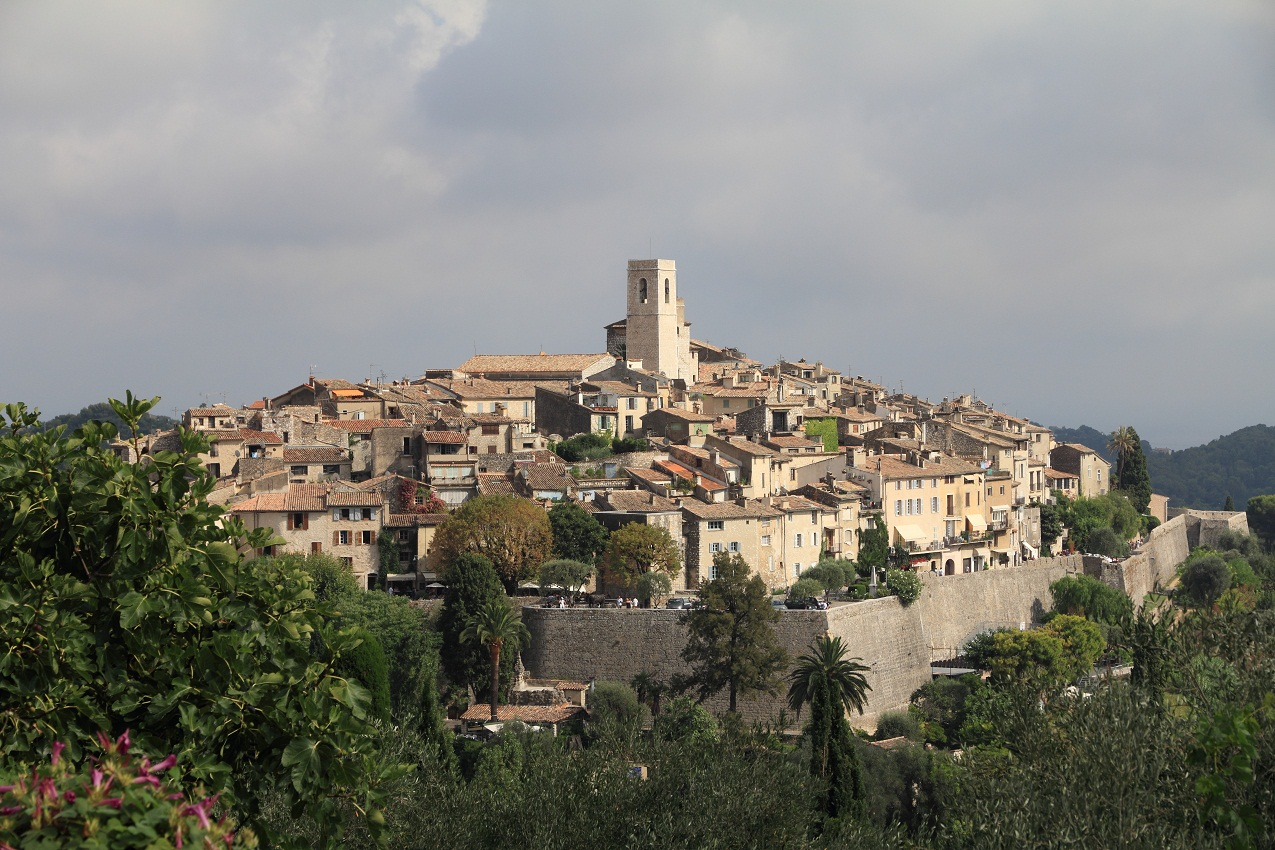
Saint-Paul-de-Vence in 2012

Rebecca Dayan was born on the French Riviera in 1984. The oldest of three siblings, she was raised in her parents' hotel in Saint-Paul-de-Vence, where she developed a love for acting, before the family moved to Nice. There, she studied art and theatre at the fine arts school Villa Thiole, before moving to Paris aged seventeen. At home in the south of France, Dayan would put on small shows for friends, and was introduced to many films and artists by her culturally-focused mother. Though her father is Jewish, her family was not religious.

== Career ==
In Paris, Dayan began modeling and working in fashion design as an assistant at Sonia Rykiel, and she has modeled for Karl Lagerfeld and Ellen von Unwerth. However, she felt like she belonged in New York City, and moved to the United States in 2009. She told WWD that pursuing acting as a second career felt risky, but she had her family's support. Her first acting roles were small parts in From Paris with Love, Limitless, and Celeste and Jesse Forever, released between 2010 and 2012. She had a larger role in the second half of the 2014 indie horror H., in which she plays an artist like herself. H. premiered in the College Biennale of the 71st Venice International Film Festival.

As a painter, Dayan displayed a collection called "Assumption" at the Catherine Ahnell Gallery in New York in 2015, using mostly watercolors to depict images of women as Madonna figures in reclamation of the word "virgin". While she worked on her art, she also lived in a studio at the gallery, and had various famous women sit for her in modern renditions of Madonna poses.

She then had her first major acting role, starring as supporting character Sister Emanuel in the 2017 film Novitiate, about young nuns, with Margaret Qualley and Dianna Agron. Originally, Dayan was set to play the character that ultimately went to Morgan Saylor when Dayan and writer-director Maggie Betts realised that Sister Emanuel would fit Dayan better. As the film was long in development, Dayan used some of her discussions with Betts as inspiration for her "Assumption" collection. Novitiate saw positive reviews. The San Francisco Chronicle praised that as part of the film's ensemble, actresses Dayan, Agron, and Julianne Nicholson "would be the highlight of any other film, the person audiences would go home talking about".

Dayan portrayed French actress Sarah Bernhardt in the 2020 Nikola Tesla biopic Tesla. In part, the film looks at Tesla's obsession with Bernhardt. Vulture said that writer-director Michael Almereyda shoots Dayan "as if she were her own paradoxically liberating-intoxicating, techno-natural Earth-machine force: At one point, we see her enter a room to a throbbing disco beat, a very contemporary-looking entourage trailing behind her, like she's bringing modernity itself with her". Variety called her "erotically frightful" in the role.

In 2019, she was cast to portray Italian designer Elsa Peretti in the Ryan Murphy miniseries Halston. Originally she was going to audition for a part in the show which was ultimately removed in rewrites, but her manager thought she would be better as Elsa. The miniseries was filmed before and during the COVID-19 pandemic. In 2021, when it was released on Netflix, Dayan was working on a feature she had written and hoped to create. The same year, she starred in the tenth season of Murphy's American Horror Story, subtitled Double Feature. In 2022, she returned for the eleventh season, NYC. She also starred in an episode of the spin-off series American Horror Stories.

== Activism ==
Dayan uses various media to raise awareness of maternal mortality in the United States, and women's health generally. After watching the documentary The Business of Being Born she became concerned with the rising maternal mortality rates in the United States, the only case of this in the developed world. She has since produced the documentary Born Free on the subject and started the non-profit Mother Lover.

== Filmography ==
=== Film ===
Year	Title	Role	Notes
2010	From Paris with Love	Foreign Minister's Aide	
2011	Limitless		
2012	Celeste and Jesse Forever	Veronica	
2014	H.	Helen	
2017	Novitiate	Sister Emanuel	
2020	Tesla	Sarah Bernhardt	

=== Television ===
Year	Title	Role	Notes
2021	Halston	Elsa Peretti	Miniseries; main role
2021	American Horror Story: Double Feature	Maria Wycoff	2 episodes
2022	American Horror Stories	Dr. Enid Perle	Episode: "Facelift"
2022	American Horror Story: NYC	Alana Delarue	2 episodes

=== Music videos ===
Year	Song	Artist	Notes
2020	The Runner	Alison Sudol	

== Awards and nominations ==
Year	Award	Award category	Title of work	Result
2022	FANDOM Awards	Most Terrifying Performance of the Year	American Horror Story: Double Feature	Nominated
