= John David Ridge =

American Costume Designer

John David Ridge is an American costume designer.

== Early professional career ==
Ridge started his artistic life in community theater as a child, before apprenticing at the age of 14 at an equity stock company. While he did various work in theatre, he eventually focused on costuming. He attended the Pratt Institute and in 1968 was one of the first to graduate from the New York University School of the Arts in Theatre design.

He then obtained a New York Union card, enabling him to work in professional costume designs in Broadway productions.

Ridge was selected by John Houseman to head the design school at Juilliard in 1970. In 1975, he moved to managing the Brooks-Van Horn Costume Company, at the same time as being the Costume Supervisor for the National Theatre of Great Britain.

== Work with Halston ==
He was appointed Vice-President and Design Director for Halston Enterprises in New York, Taking over from Halston and produced a number of collections, working for the company for six years after Halston stepped down in 1984.

Ridge worked closely with Halston on the couture range, as well as overall product development. Halston was ousted from the company, and Ridge took over to replace him as the Design Director for the house. He oversaw Senior Designer Bert Keeter who was responsible for designing the Halston collection for JCPENNY and the MTO collections, the couture collection, the ready to wear line, and the Halston III collection.

Ridge left Halston after the company was purchased by Revlon, who then closed the couture arm down.

== Post-Halston career ==
Ridge continued work designing theatre costume after leaving the Halston company, opening his own costume shop to service the industry in Hollywood in 1993. In 1999 he became a visiting professor at UCLA, teaching in the theatre department. He continues to produce individual couture and has worked extensively in cinema.

In 2017 Ridge was chosen as designer for a revival of My Fair Lady. For this Ridge had to reproduce the costumes from drawings of the original designs created by Cecil Beaton for the original production 60 years prior. Ridge had worked with Beaton when the show ran in 1976, so had a connection to and understanding of Beaton's work.

== Work in cinema ==
Ridge has worked extensively in the film industry, producing costumes for the last thirty years. He has designed costumes for a range of films including Spider-Man (2002), Charlie's Angels: Full Throttle (2003), Seabiscuit (2003), Kill Bill: Volume 1 (2003), Practical Magic (1998), The Quick and the Dead (1995), and The Wiz (1978).

== Awards ==
Ridge has been nominated for a Tony Award, and has been awarded various awards over his career.

- Nominated for a Tony Award for Ring Round the Moon
- Woodbury Design Award in 2002 (In recognition for his work with Halston enterprises)
- The Carbonell Award for Best Costume Design
- Woodbury University (Los Angeles) Lifetime Achievement Award in Design 2002
- Theatre Development Fund/Irene Sharaff Artisan Award 2010

== Exhibits ==
Two exhibits have been held focusing on Ridge's work. An exhibit was held in Australia to focus on his work on Opera Australia's production of My Fair Lady in 2016. A major exhibit, celebrating his life work, was held at the University of Florida in 2020 honoring his life's work

== Cultural references ==
He was featured in the 2021 biopic Halston, on the designer of the same name, which portrayed him taking over the design house and working with Halston on a Martha Graham ballet performance. He was portrayed by Jack Mikesell.
