= Rania Attieh and Daniel Garcia =

Rania Attieh and Daniel Garcia are a filmmaking duo.

== Early life ==
Attieh was born in Tripoli, Lebanon where her first feature, Ok, Enough, Goodbye is set. Garcia was born in South Texas. The two met in Texas at a drawing class and later moved to New York together where Attieh attended the City College of New York and Garcia studied at NYU.

== Film career ==
Their film H. was made as part of the Venice Biennale College- Cinema Program. From the writing to the premiere of the film took approximately six months. The film premiered at the 71st Venice International Film Festival and went on to play at the 2015 Sundance Film Festival and 2015 Berlinale. The film won the duo an Independent Spirit Award for “Directors to watch” in 2015 and again got another Spirit nomination in 2016 for Robin Bartlet as “Best supporting actor”.

In 2019 the duo co directed Initials S.G. about an aging Argentinian Serge Gainsbourg impersonator. The film premiered at the 2019 Tribeca Film Festival where Attieh was awarded the Nora Ephron Award honoring excellence in storytelling by a female writer or director.

They have directed 3 episodes for CW “Two Sentence Horror Stories”. Season 1 episode “Hide” 2019 & season 2 episodes “Fix“ and “El Muerto” 2020 for which they got nominated for Imagen Foundation Award for “Best TV Directors” in 2021.

Recently, they have directed episode 105 “El Espejo” and 106 “Hunch Fo llub Seeth” of “The Resort” for Peacock.

They are Guggenheim Fellows in film and United States Artists (USA) Rockefeller grant recipients.

== Filmography ==
- Ok, Enough, Goodbye (2010)
- Recommended by Enrique (2014)
- H. (2014)
- Initials S.G. (2019)
