= Halston (miniseries) =

2021 American biographical drama television miniseries

- Genre: Biographical drama
- Created by: Sharr White
- Based on: Simply Halston by Steven Gaines
- Directed by: Daniel Minahan
- Starring: Ewan McGregor; Rebecca Dayan; David Pittu; Krysta Rodriguez; Bill Pullman
- Country of origin: United States
- Original language: English
- No. of seasons: 1
- No. of episodes: 5

Production
- Executive producers: Ryan Murphy; Christine Vachon; Ian Brennan; Alexis Martin Woodall; Pamela Koffler; Ewan McGregor; Sharr White; Daniel Minahan
- Camera setup: Single-camera
- Running time: 44–53 minutes
- Production companies: Killer Films; Ryan Murphy Productions

Original release
- Network: Netflix
- Release: May 14, 2021

Halston is an American biographical drama television miniseries based on the life of designer Halston, starring Ewan McGregor. Adapted from the 1991 book Simply Halston by Steven Gaines, the series was ordered by Netflix in September 2019 and premiered on May 14, 2021.

== Cast and characters ==
=== Main ===
- Ewan McGregor as Halston
- Rebecca Dayan as Elsa Peretti
- David Pittu as Joe Eula
- Krysta Rodriguez as Liza Minnelli
- Bill Pullman as David J. Mahoney

=== Supporting ===
- Rory Culkin as Joel Schumacher
- James Riordan as Henry Bisset
- Sullivan Jones as Ed Austin
- Kelly Bishop as Eleanor Lambert
- Gian Franco Rodriguez as Victor Hugo
- Dilone as Pat Cleveland
- Vera Farmiga as Adele
- James Waterston as Mike
- Jason Kravits as Carl Epstein
- Mary Beth Peil as Martha Graham
- Molly Jobe as Sassy Johnson
- Shawna Hamic as Pat Ast
- Maxim Swinton as Young Roy Halston
- Sietzka Rose as Karen Bjornson
- Jack Mikesell as John David Ridge
- Shannan Wilson as Bobbi Mahoney

== Episodes ==
No.	Title	Directed by	Written by	Original release date
1	"Becoming Halston"	Daniel Minahan	Ian Brennan & Ryan Murphy and Sharr White	May 14, 2021
Halston gains notoriety for the pillbox hat worn by Jackie Kennedy at the 1961 inauguration, then for the daring looks worn by Liza Minnelli in her 1972 concert film.
2	"Versailles"	Daniel Minahan	Ian Brennan and Ted Malawer	May 14, 2021
Halston and his team fly to Paris in 1973 to participate in the Battle of Versailles fashion show.
3	"The Sweet Smell of Success"	Daniel Minahan	Ryan Murphy & Ian Brennan and Tim Pinckney & Kristina Woo	May 14, 2021
As business booms, expanding to luggage and other retail lines, Halston releases a signature fragrance for women in 1975.
4	"The Party's Over"	Daniel Minahan	Ryan Murphy & Ian Brennan and Sharr White	May 14, 2021
Wild nights at Studio 54 and an increasing cocaine habit take their toll on Halston. After alienating his collaborators, Halston accepts a deal designing affordable clothes for JCPenney in 1983.
5	"Critics"	Daniel Minahan	Ian Brennan & Ryan Murphy and Ted Malawer	May 14, 2021
Business demands wreak havoc in Halston's personal and professional affairs, resulting in him being ousted from his company and losing the right to use the "Halston" name. His friendship with Martha Graham offers a chance to design costumes for Perséphone, earning Halston triumphant acclaim in 1987.

== Production ==
=== Development ===
In January 2019, it was announced that Legendary Television and Killer Films had put in development Simply Halston, a miniseries based on the life of Halston that would be based on the book of the same name by Steven Gaines, with Ewan McGregor set to star as Halston and the series to be written by Sharr White and directed by Daniel Minahan.

In September 2019, Ryan Murphy revealed to Time that he had signed onto Halston as an executive producer and that the series had been ordered by Netflix under his overall deal at the company. The series premiered on May 14, 2021.

=== Casting ===
On February 18, 2020, Murphy announced on a since deleted Instagram post that in addition to McGregor starring, other cast members of Halston included Krysta Rodriguez as Liza Minnelli, Rory Culkin as Joel Schumacher, Rebecca Dayan as Elsa Peretti, Sullivan Jones as Ed Austin, David Pittu as Joe Eula, Gian Franco Rodriguez as Victor Hugo, and Maxim Swinton as Young Roy Halston.

== Reception ==
Based on its evaluation of 54 critic reviews, Rotten Tomatoes reported an approval rating of 67% for the limited series, with an average rating of 6.30/10. The website's critics consensus reads, "Ewan McGregor brings megawatt charisma to match Halston's vibrant recreation of a fashion era, but the series' glib treatment of the legendary designer's interior life yields a lot of style with little substance." Metacritic gave the series a weighted average score of 50 out of 100 based on 20 critic reviews, indicating "mixed or average reviews".

== Accolades ==
Award	Year	Category	Nominee(s)	Result	Ref.
Primetime Emmy Awards	2021	Outstanding Lead Actor in a Limited or Anthology Series or Movie	Ewan McGregor	Won	
Primetime Creative Arts Emmy Awards	2021	Outstanding Production Design for a Narrative Period or Fantasy Program (One Hour or More)	Mark Ricker, Nithya Shrinivasan and Cherish M. Hale	Nominated	
Primetime Creative Arts Emmy Awards	2021	Outstanding Period Costumes	Jeriana San Juan, Catherine Crabtree, Cailey Breneman and Anne Newton-Harding (for "Versailles")	Nominated	
Primetime Creative Arts Emmy Awards	2021	Outstanding Period and/or Character Makeup (Non-Prosthetic)	Patricia Regan, Claus Lulla, Margot Boccia and Joseph A. Campayno (for "Versailles")	Nominated	
Primetime Creative Arts Emmy Awards	2021	Outstanding Music Supervision	Amanda Krieg Thomas, Alexis Martin Woodall and Ryan Murphy (for "The Party's Over")	Nominated	
Golden Globe Awards	2022	Best Actor in a Miniseries or Television Film	Ewan McGregor	Nominated	
GLAAD Media Awards	2022	Outstanding Limited or Anthology Series	Halston	Nominated	
Screen Actors Guild Awards	2022	Outstanding Performance by a Male Actor in a Miniseries or Television Movie	Ewan McGregor	Nominated	
Writers Guild of America Awards	2022	Outstanding Writing – TV Adapted Long Form	Ian Brennan, Ted Malawer, Ryan Murphy, Tim Pinckney, Sharr White, Kristina Woo	Nominated	
