= American Horror Story =

Anthology television series

- Genre: Horror; Drama; Anthology
- Created by: Ryan Murphy; Brad Falchuk
- Showrunners: Ryan Murphy; Halley Feiffer
- Starring: see List of American Horror Story cast members
- Theme music composer: Cesar Davila-Irizarry; Charlie Clouser; Mac Quayle
- Composers: James S. Levine; Mac Quayle
- Country of origin: United States
- Original language: English
- No. of seasons: 13
- No. of episodes: 145 (list of episodes)

Production
- Executive producers: Ryan Murphy; Brad Falchuk; Dante Di Loreto; Tim Minear; James Wong; Jennifer Salt; Bradley Buecker; Alexis Martin Woodall; Crystal Liu; Adam Penn; John J. Gray; Sarah Paulson; Manny Coto; Our Lady J; Halley Feiffer; Scott Robertson; Tanase Popa; Ned Martel; Charlie Carver; Nissa Diederich; Eric Kovtun; Crystle Roberson Dorsey
- Producers: Patrick McKee; Robert M. Williams Jr.; Lou Eyrich; Evan Peters; Sara Stelwagen; Karl Frankenfield; Eryn Krueger Mekash; Todd Nenninger; Franzis Müller; Sean Sforza
- Cinematography: Christopher Baffa; Michael Goi; Gavin Kelly; Andrew Mitchell
- Editors: Fabienne Bouville; Ken Ramos; Adam Penn
- Camera setup: Single camera
- Running time: 22–73 minutes
- Production companies: Brad Falchuk Teley-Vision; Ryan Murphy Television (Note: Known as Ryan Murphy Productions for the first six seasons); 20th Television (Note: Known as 20th Century Fox Television for the first nine seasons)

Original release
- Network: FX
- Release: October 5, 2011 – present

Related
- American Story; American Horror Stories

American Horror Story (AHS) is an American horror anthology television series created by Ryan Murphy and Brad Falchuk for the cable network FX. The first installment in the American Story media franchise, seasons of AHS are mostly conceived as self-contained miniseries, following a different set of characters in a new setting within the same fictional universe (which the show occasionally uses for crossovers between seasons, and shares with spin-off American Horror Stories), and a storyline with its own beginning, middle, and end. Some plot elements of each season are loosely inspired by true events. The latest season, 13, premiered in September 2026. In October 2026, American Horror Story was renewed for a fourteenth season.

Many actors appear in more than one season, usually playing a new character though sometimes as a returning character. Evan Peters and Sarah Paulson appear in ten seasons; Lily Rabe and Frances Conroy have starred in nine seasons; Denis O'Hare appears in eight; Emma Roberts, Billie Lourd, and Leslie Grossman appear in seven; Jessica Lange, Kathy Bates, Angela Bassett, and Jamie Brewer appear in six; and Adina Porter, Finn Wittrock, Gabourey Sidibe, and John Carroll Lynch appear in five seasons.

Although reception to individual seasons has varied, American Horror Story has largely been well received by television critics, with the majority of the praise going towards the cast, particularly Jessica Lange, who won two Emmy Awards, a Golden Globe Award, and a Screen Actors Guild Award for her performances. James Cromwell and Kathy Bates each won an Emmy Award for their performances, while Lady Gaga won a Golden Globe Award. The series draws consistently high ratings for the FX network, with its first season being the most-viewed new cable series of 2011.

== Cast and characters ==
Introduced in Murder House

- Connie Britton as Vivien Harmon
- Dylan McDermott as Dr. Ben Harmon
- Evan Peters as Tate Langdon
- Taissa Farmiga as Violet Harmon
- Denis O'Hare as Larry Harvey
- Jessica Lange as Constance Langdon

Introduced in Asylum

- Zachary Quinto as Dr. Oliver Thredson
- Joseph Fiennes as Monsignor Timothy Howard
- Sarah Paulson as Lana Winters
- Evan Peters as Kit Walker
- Lily Rabe as Sister Mary Eunice McKee
- Lizzie Brocheré as Grace Bertrand
- James Cromwell as Dr. Arthur Arden
- Jessica Lange as Sister Jude Martin

Introduced in Coven

- Sarah Paulson as Cordelia Goode
- Taissa Farmiga as Zoe Benson
- Frances Conroy as Myrtle Snow
- Evan Peters as Kyle Spencer
- Lily Rabe as Misty Day
- Emma Roberts as Madison Montgomery
- Denis O'Hare as Otis 'Spalding' Van Wirt
- Kathy Bates as Madame Delphine LaLaurie
- Jessica Lange as Fiona Goode
- Angela Bassett as Marie Laveau (later promoted in 13)
- Gabourey Sidibe as Queenie (later promoted in 13)

Introduced in Freak Show

- Sarah Paulson as Bette and Dot Tattler
- Evan Peters as Jimmy Darling
- Michael Chiklis as Wendell 'Dell' Toledo
- Frances Conroy as Gloria Mott
- Denis O'Hare as Stanislaus 'Stanley' Spencer
- Emma Roberts as Maggie Esmerelda
- Finn Wittrock as Dandy Mott
- Angela Bassett as Desiree Dupree
- Kathy Bates as Ethel Darling
- Jessica Lange as Elsa Mars

Introduced in Hotel

- Kathy Bates as Iris Holloway
- Sarah Paulson as Sally McKenna
- Evan Peters as James Patrick March
- Wes Bentley as Det. John Lowe
- Matt Bomer as Donovan Holloway
- Chloë Sevigny as Dr. Alex Lowe
- Denis O'Hare as Liz Taylor
- Cheyenne Jackson as Will Drake
- Angela Bassett as Ramona Royale
- Lady Gaga as Elizabeth Johnson

Introduced in Roanoke

- Kathy Bates as Agnes Mary Winstead
- Sarah Paulson as Audrey Tindall
- Cuba Gooding Jr. as Dominic Banks
- Lily Rabe as Shelby Miller
- André Holland as Matt Miller
- Denis O'Hare as William van Henderson
- Wes Bentley as Dylan Conrad
- Evan Peters as Rory Monahan
- Cheyenne Jackson as Sidney Aaron James
- Angela Bassett as Monet Tumusiime

Introduced in Cult

- Sarah Paulson as Ally Mayfair-Richards
- Evan Peters as Kai Anderson
- Cheyenne Jackson as Dr. Vincent Anderson
- Billie Lourd as Winter Anderson
- Alison Pill as Ivy Mayfair-Richards

Introduced in Apocalypse

- Sarah Paulson as Ms. Wilhemina Venable
- Evan Peters as Malcolm Gallant and Jeff Pfister
- Adina Porter as Dinah Stevens
- Billie Lourd as Mallory
- Leslie Grossman as Coco St. Pierre Vanderbilt
- Cody Fern as Michael Langdon
- Cheyenne Jackson as John Henry Moore
- Kathy Bates as Ms. Miriam Mead

Introduced in 1984

- Emma Roberts as Brooke Thompson
- Billie Lourd as Montana Duke
- Leslie Grossman as Margaret Booth
- Cody Fern as Xavier Plympton
- Matthew Morrison as Trevor Kirchner
- Gus Kenworthy as Chet Clancy
- John Carroll Lynch as Benjamin Richter / Mr. Jingles
- Angelica Ross as Dr. Donna Chambers
- Zach Villa as Richard Ramirez

Introduced in Double Feature

- Sarah Paulson as "Tuberculosis" Karen and Mamie Eisenhower
- Evan Peters as Austin Sommers
- Lily Rabe as Doris Gardner and Amelia Earhart
- Finn Wittrock as Harry Gardner
- Frances Conroy as Sarah "Belle Noir" Cunningham
- Billie Lourd as Leslie "Lark" Feldman
- Leslie Grossman as Ursula Caan and Calico
- Adina Porter as Chief Burleson
- Angelica Ross as The Chemist and Theta
- Macaulay Culkin as Mickey
- Ryan Kiera Armstrong as Alma Gardner
- Neal McDonough as Dwight Eisenhower
- Kaia Gerber as Kendall Carr
- Nico Greetham as Cal Cambon
- Isaac Powell as Troy Lord
- Rachel Hilson as Jamie Howard
- Rebecca Dayan as Maria Wycoff

Introduced in NYC

- Russell Tovey as Det. Patrick Read
- Joe Mantello as Gino Barelli
- Billie Lourd as Dr. Hannah Wells
- Denis O'Hare as Henry Grant
- Charlie Carver as Adam Carpenter
- Leslie Grossman as Barbara Read
- Sandra Bernhard as Fran Levinsky
- Isaac Powell as Theo Graves
- Zachary Quinto as Sam Jones
- Patti LuPone as Kathy Pizazz

Introduced in Delicate

- Emma Roberts as Anna Victoria Alcott
- Matt Czuchry as Dexter 'Dex' Harding Jr.
- Kim Kardashian as Siobhan Corbyn
- Annabelle Dexter-Jones as Sonia Shawcross and Adeline Harding
- Michaela Jaé Rodriguez as Nicolette Smith
- Denis O'Hare as Dr. Andrew Hill
- Cara Delevingne as Ivy Ehrenreich
- Julie White as Ms. Mavis Preecher
- Maaz Ali as Kamal Aman

Introduced in 13

- Joey Pollari as Ben DeSoto
- Jessica Lange as Margaret Thatcher

== Seasons ==
| Season | Title | Episodes | | Originally released | |
| Season | Title | Episodes | | First released | Last released |
|---|---|---|---|---|---|
| 1 | Murder House | 12 | | October 5, 2011 | December 21, 2011 |
| 2 | Asylum | 13 | | October 17, 2012 | January 23, 2013 |
| 3 | Coven | 13 | | October 9, 2013 | January 29, 2014 |
| 4 | Freak Show | 13 | | October 8, 2014 | January 21, 2015 |
| 5 | Hotel | 12 | | October 7, 2015 | January 13, 2016 |
| 6 | Roanoke | 10 | | September 14, 2016 | November 16, 2016 |
| 7 | Cult | 11 | | September 5, 2017 | November 14, 2017 |
| 8 | Apocalypse | 10 | | September 12, 2018 | November 14, 2018 |
| 9 | 1984 | 9 | | September 18, 2019 | November 13, 2019 |
| 10 | Double Feature (Note: The tenth season is split into two narrative parts that aired consecutively, each of which also has its own subtitle; Red Tide for the first six episodes, and Death Valley for the latter four.) | 10 | 6 | August 25, 2021 | September 22, 2021 |
| 10 | Double Feature | 10 | 4 | September 29, 2021 | October 20, 2021 |
| 11 | NYC | 10 | | October 19, 2022 | November 16, 2022 |
| 12 | Delicate | 9 | 5 | September 20, 2023 | October 18, 2023 |
| 12 | Delicate | 9 | 4 | April 3, 2024 | April 24, 2024 |
| 13 | 13 | 13 | | September 24, 2026 | October 29, 2026 |

=== Murder House (2011) ===
Set in 2011, the season follows the Harmon family, which consists of wife and mother Vivien (Connie Britton), her psychiatrist husband Ben (Dylan McDermott), and their teenage daughter Violet (Taissa Farmiga), as they move from Boston to Los Angeles to make a fresh start after Vivien has a miscarriage. Soon after the miscarriage and before the move, Ben has an affair with one of his students, which almost tears the family apart. They move into a restored mansion and soon encounter the residence's housekeeper, Moira O'Hara (Frances Conroy and Alexandra Breckenridge), and their neighbors—the eccentric Langdon family, consisting of Constance (Jessica Lange) and her daughter Adelaide (Jamie Brewer), who has Down syndrome.

The Harmons' lives are troubled by the meddling Langdons, the incompetent realtor Marcy (Christine Estabrook), the disfigured Larry Harvey (Denis O'Hare), a former resident of the mansion who is secretly in love with Constance, and the scorned Hayden McClaine (Kate Mara), Ben's former student who follows him to Los Angeles. Ben and Vivien try to rekindle their relationship while Violet, experiencing depression, finds comfort in Tate (Evan Peters), one of Ben's patients.

The family soon discovers that the home is haunted by the ghosts of anyone who has ever died on the property, including its creators Charles (Matt Ross) and Nora Montgomery (Lily Rabe); and their deformed son Thaddeus (Ben Woolf) who is sometimes referred to as the 'Infantata'. Flashbacks depict the mansion's previous homeowners throughout the last century, dating back to its construction in the 1920s.

=== Asylum (2012–2013) ===
Set in 1964, the season follows the patients and staff members of the church-owned mental asylum Briarcliff Manor, located in an undisclosed town in Massachusetts, which was founded to treat and house the criminally insane. Kit Walker (Evan Peters), accused of being a prolific serial killer named "Bloody Face" after the disappearance of his wife Alma (Britne Oldford)—though he claims she was abducted by aliens—is incarcerated at Briarcliff. This piques the interest of ambitious lesbian journalist Lana Winters (Sarah Paulson), who is yearning to find a story for her big break.

At Briarcliff, Kit meets the other patients, many of whom claim to be unjustly institutionalized, including microcephalic Pepper (Naomi Grossman), nymphomaniac Shelley (Chloë Sevigny), whose cheating husband hypocritically committed her after finding her in bed with two guys; and the unassuming Grace Bertrand (Lizzie Brocheré) from France. Believed to be a violent serial killer, Kit becomes the subject of interest of pragmatic psychiatrist Dr. Oliver Thredson (Zachary Quinto) and the sadistic Dr. Arthur Arden (James Cromwell), with Arden routinely conducting scientific operations on patients.

The institution is run under the watchful eye of the stern Sister Jude (Jessica Lange), and her second-in-command, the naïve Sister Mary Eunice (Lily Rabe), and the founder of the institution, Monsignor Timothy Howard (Joseph Fiennes). Briarcliff's inhabitants are routinely subject to supernatural and scientific influences, including demonic possession and extraterrestrial abduction.

=== Coven (2013–2014) ===
Set in 2013, the season follows the dwindling descendants of the witches who survived the Salem witch trials and their struggle to survive in the modern world since those who are discovered to be witches are often subjected to violent attacks from outside forces, such as voodoo practitioners. Zoe Benson (Taissa Farmiga), a young teenager completely unaware of the existence of witches, discovers her identity after an accident that causes the death of her boyfriend. She is sent to an all-girls boarding school in New Orleans which aims to protect young witches and teach them how to control their powers.

There, she meets the other students, narcissistic movie star Madison Montgomery (Emma Roberts), outspoken human voodoo doll Queenie (Gabourey Sidibe), and an enigmatic telepath Nan (Jamie Brewer), and gets entangled with a good-natured college student Kyle Spencer (Evan Peters). The school is run by headmistress Cordelia Foxx (Sarah Paulson), head of the Witches Council and eccentric fashionista Myrtle Snow (Frances Conroy), and the mute butler Spalding (Denis O'Hare).

Cordelia's mother, Fiona Goode (Jessica Lange), is the Supreme and most powerful witch of her generation, though she regularly avoids her responsibilities, much to the chagrin of Cordelia and her long-time rival Myrtle. After a mob of townspeople discover and burn a young witch named Misty Day (Lily Rabe), Fiona returns to lead the coven, creating conflict with Cordelia and the other young witches as they all conspire to succeed Fiona as the next Supreme.

=== Freak Show (2014–2015) ===
Set in 1952, the season follows a struggling freak show led by Elsa Mars (Jessica Lange) in the sleepy town of Jupiter, Florida. Decades have passed since the public has looked upon freak shows as a form of entertainment, but Elsa dreams of finding a home for her "monsters", as well as for her own fame and fortune. Other members of her troupe include "Lobster Boy" Jimmy Darling (Evan Peters), who dreams of living a normal life, and his mother Ethel (Kathy Bates), a bearded lady who acts as Elsa's second-in-command by maintaining law and order under the tent.

A strongman from Ethel's past and Jimmy's biological father Dell Toledo (Michael Chiklis), and his three-breasted wife Desiree Dupree (Angela Bassett), arrive to join the freak show. To drum up business and save her troupe once and for all, Elsa also recruits conjoined twin sisters Bette and Dot Tattler (Sarah Paulson) to perform for her show. In a time when the era of television is beginning to reign high over sideshow acts, these individuals must overcome those who persecute them based on their looks.

As the season unfolds, it is revealed that multiple dark entities have taken up residence in Jupiter, with all of their eyes being set on the freaks. A conman named Stanley (Denis O'Hare), posing as a Hollywood executive, arrives with his young protégé Maggie Esmerelda (Emma Roberts), who becomes involved with Jimmy. The wealthy and spoiled Dandy Mott (Finn Wittrock), enabled by his doting mother Gloria (Frances Conroy), develops an unhealthy obsession with the freaks, particularly Bette and Dot. Perhaps the most dangerous of them all is a mysterious, deformed killer clown, known only as Twisty (John Carroll Lynch), who wreaks havoc on Jupiter and appears to be targeting freaks and townspeople alike.

=== Hotel (2015–2016) ===
Set in 2015, the season follows the strange and dangerous happenings that seem to center around the retro Hotel Cortez in downtown Los Angeles, California, initially built as a secret torture chamber to fulfill the violent desires of founder James Patrick March (Evan Peters). Detective John Lowe (Wes Bentley) arrives at the hotel, based on intel from an anonymous tip, to investigate a grisly string of murders, each of which exemplifies a sin in violation of one of the Ten Commandments. He has become estranged from his wife Alex (Chloë Sevigny), who has depression, and his daughter Scarlett (Shree Crooks), after the disappearance of their son Holden (Lennon Henry) five years earlier.

The hotel is led by March's fashionista widow Elizabeth Johnson (Lady Gaga), also known as the Countess—who was mutated into a vampire by her former lovers, actor Rudolph Valentino (Finn Wittrock) and his wife Natacha Rambova (Alexandra Daddario)—and her current lover Donovan (Matt Bomer). Throughout his investigation, John also becomes entangled with the spirits of a heroin junkie named Sally McKenna (Sarah Paulson), hotel maid Hazel Evers (Mare Winningham), and James Patrick March, who is looking for a protégé to continue the violent acts he started when he was alive.

The hotel's tireless staff includes the surly front desk manager Iris (Kathy Bates), Donovan's mother, and her best friend, the transgender bartender Liz Taylor (Denis O'Hare), both of whom hesitantly cater to Elizabeth and her vampiric children, one out of a desire to remain close to her son and the other out of a sense of loyalty. Elizabeth's relationship with Donovan becomes troubled with the arrival of attractive male model and cocaine addict Tristan Duffy (also played by Wittrock), New York fashion designer Will Drake (Cheyenne Jackson), and her scorned ex-lover Ramona Royale (Angela Bassett), all of whom become entangled in her violent life.

=== Roanoke (2016) ===
Set from 2014 to 2016, the season follows the supernatural events that occur in a renovated farmhouse in North Carolina, which is situated on the land where the Roanoke Colony moved after their infamous 1580s disappearance. In 2015, Shelby Miller (Lily Rabe), her husband Matt (André Holland), along with Matt's sister Lee Harris (Adina Porter) recounted their harrowing experience living in the farmhouse a year prior in a popular documentary series titled My Roanoke Nightmare, including their encounters with the violent and vengeful ghosts of the house's previous residents and the Roanoke Colony, the cannibalistic Polk family who live nearby, and the bloodthirsty immortal witch, Scathach (Lady Gaga).

The documentary becomes a huge success, featuring dramatic reenactments of the Millers' story starring Audrey Tindall (Sarah Paulson) as Shelby, Dominic Banks (Cuba Gooding Jr.) as Matt, Monet Tumusiime (Angela Bassett) as Lee, Agnes Mary Winstead (Kathy Bates) as Thomasin White—also known as The Butcher, leader of the ghost colony, Audrey's husband Rory Monahan (Evan Peters) as Edward Philipe Mott, the creator and first owner of the house, William van Henderson (Denis O'Hare) as Dr. Elias Cunningham, a professor who becomes entranced with the paranormal happenings of the area, and Dylan Conrad (Wes Bentley) as Ambrose White, Thomasin's son, and accomplice.

In 2016, the success of the documentary leads to a sequel titled Return to Roanoke: Three Days in Hell, spearheaded by the producer of the original series, Sidney Aaron James (Cheyenne Jackson), who invites the Millers, as well as many of the reenactment actors, to return to the farmhouse for three days during the blood moon, where all their actions will be captured by hidden cameras. Although the Millers are aware of the entities that reside in the house, all three agree to return, each with their own agenda. However, the production eventually descends into a chaotic, yet tragic disaster as the tensions between the reenactors and real-life counterparts quickly begin to rise while the violent entities begin to surface, leading them to fight for survival.

=== Cult (2017) ===
Set in 2016 and 2017, the fictional town of Brookfield Heights, Michigan, is left divided in the wake of Donald Trump's election as president. Local restaurant owner Ally Mayfair-Richards (Sarah Paulson) is left utterly distraught, along with her wife Ivy (Alison Pill). Despite the help of her psychiatrist, Dr. Rudy Vincent (Cheyenne Jackson), Ally becomes increasingly unstable in the following weeks, as her long repressed phobias begin to re-emerge, and they begin to affect her relationships with her wife and their son, Oz (Cooper Dodson).

Across town, misogynistic alt-righter Kai Anderson (Evan Peters) rejoices at the election results, enticing him to pursue political power by running for city council, led by radical feminist Bebe Babbitt (Frances Conroy) and with the help of his reluctant, liberal sister Winter (Billie Lourd), who the Mayfair-Richards household hire as their nanny. As Ally attempts to re-adjust to regular life despite her growing anxiety and paranoia, she becomes terrorized by a group of masked assailants, dressed in clown attire, who are only present when she is alone, leaving those around her to wonder if she was truly attacked, or if they were merely hallucinations.

Ally's new eccentric neighbors Harrison (Billy Eichner) and Meadow Wilton (Leslie Grossman) move in next door, while news reporter Beverly Hope (Adina Porter) descends upon every crime scene to report the murders. Also in the midst of the chaos is Jack Samuels (Colton Haynes), a detective who investigates the crimes and is initially doubtful about Ally's claims, and Gary K. Longstreet (Chaz Bono), a supermarket owner who has an amputated arm and is a passionate Trump supporter. With Kai's rise to power revealing sinister motives, Ally starts to draw connections between her alleged clown attackers and the many strange incidents occurring in Brookfield Heights. She begins to fear that everyone in town is out to get her, amplifying her growing distrust of those around her.

=== Apocalypse (2018) ===
In the year 2020, the Antichrist, Michael Langdon (Cody Fern), brings about the apocalypse by instigating nuclear warfare. The chosen survivors of the aftermath, heiress Coco St. Pierre Vanderbilt (Leslie Grossman), her personal assistant Mallory (Billie Lourd), hairstylist Mr. Gallant (Evan Peters), his grandmother Evie (Joan Collins), talk-show host Dinah Stevens (Adina Porter), Stevens' son Andre (Jeffrey Bowyer-Chapman), young adults Timothy Campbell (Kyle Allen) and Emily (Ash Santos), among others, take refuge in a fallout shelter named "Outpost 3", run with an iron fist by Wilhemina Venable (Sarah Paulson) and Miriam Mead (Kathy Bates) along with The Fist (Erika Ervin), a brutish and tall female guard.

Flashbacks to 2017 reveal that "Outpost 3" was an all-boys warlock school led by John Henry Moore (Cheyenne Jackson) that unknowingly harbored the Antichrist, in hopes that he would rise as the first ever male Supreme. The witches' council of Cordelia Goode (Sarah Paulson), Zoe Benson (Taissa Farmiga), and the resurrected Myrtle Snow (Frances Conroy) are summoned and quickly discover how dangerous Michael is to their coven when faced with his evident powers, as he resurrects deceased witches Queenie (Gabourey Sidibe), Madison Montgomery (Emma Roberts), and Misty Day (Lily Rabe). The coven, with the aid of the warlocks, attempt to save humanity by discovering new witch Mallory's intense powers, learning more about Michael's mysterious origins, in particular from Michael's birth-mother Vivien Harmon (Connie Britton) and grandmother Constance Langdon (Jessica Lange), and how to defeat him to prevent the apocalypse.

=== 1984 (2019) ===
Set in the titular year of 1984, the season follows Brooke Thompson (Emma Roberts) as she travels to a remote, newly reopened summer camp, known as Camp Redwood, to work as a counselor following a terrifying encounter with serial killer Richard Ramirez, "The Night Stalker" (Zach Villa). Those traveling with Brooke include preppy Xavier Plympton (Cody Fern), athletic Chet Clancy (Gus Kenworthy), easy-going Ray Powell (DeRon Horton), and spunky Montana Duke (Billie Lourd).

Upon arriving at the camp, they encounter its owner, the deeply religious Margaret Booth (Leslie Grossman), who was once a camper there, and who has her own experience surviving a killer. Other residents of Camp Redwood include its nurse Rita (Angelica Ross), activities director Trevor Kirchner (Matthew Morrison), and camp chef Bertie (Tara Karsian).

Not long after the counselors settle into their first week, news breaks that deranged murderer Benjamin Richter (John Carroll Lynch), also known as Mr. Jingles, has escaped a local insane asylum and is presumed to be heading for the camp, where he has a violent history. However, as the season progresses, more secrets unveil about the counselors, as well as flashbacks detailing the history of the camp, including Richter's abusive mother Lavinia (Lily Rabe).

=== Double Feature (2021) ===
In Part 1, titled Red Tide, struggling writer Harry Gardner (Finn Wittrock), his pregnant wife Doris (Lily Rabe), and their daughter Alma (Ryan Kiera Armstrong) move to Provincetown, an isolated beach town in Massachusetts, for the winter of 2021 so Harry can work in peace without any disturbances. Once they are settled in, the town's true residents begin to make themselves known. Harry suffers from writer's block and later goes to a bar called the Muse one night, where he meets singer and songwriter Austin Sommers (Evan Peters) and erotic novelist Sarah Cunningham, known by the pseudonym Belle Noir (Frances Conroy), who assist him with his problem. A mysterious black pill is presented to Harry by Austin who claims it will help those with creativity and talent become increasingly advanced with their work, however, the pill also exacts a price in the form of horrifying side effects. Strange creatures referred to as "pale people" terrorize the stark and hollow town.

Throughout the season, many disturbing events unfold, alongside various characters. They include the unhygienic Mickey (Macaulay Culkin), Harry's stern agent Ursula Khan (Leslie Grossman), tattooist and body modifier Lark Feldman (Billie Lourd), an eccentric homeless woman called Tuberculosis Karen (Sarah Paulson), nosy rookie chief of police Chief Burleson (Adina Porter), a mysterious woman called the Chemist (Angelica Ross), and interior designer Holden Vaughn (Denis O'Hare).

In Part 2, titled Death Valley, Kendall Carr (Kaia Gerber), Cal Cambon (Nico Greetham), Troy Lord (Isaac Cole Powell) and Jamie Howard (Rachel Hilson), four college students who are on a camping trip in 2021 are swept up in a horrifying and deadly extraterrestrial conspiracy that has been developing for decades. In 1954, President Dwight D. Eisenhower (Neal McDonough) has been given a dreadful task to reason with some unexpected and unwanted guests as his wife, Mamie Eisenhower (Sarah Paulson), has gone behind his back and makes a life-threatening decision.

=== NYC (2022) ===
Set in 1981 New York City, a series of murders targeting the gay community garners hatred for the apathetic NYPD. Closeted detective Patrick Read (Russell Tovey) and his partner, New York Native reporter Gino Barelli (Joe Mantello) for whom Patrick left his ex, Barbara Read (Leslie Grossman), begin investigating the murderous homicidal duo consisting of the elusive leather-clad "Big Daddy" and twisted Mr. Gideon Whitely (Jeff Hiller). Their differing opinions on how to approach the investigation, leads to a rough patch in their relationship.

Patrick and Gino are joined by Adam Carpenter (Charlie Carver), a young gay man whose friend has gone missing. Adam's search leads him to a connection with photographer Theo Graves (Isaac Cole Powell), though this draws jealousy from Theo's toxic partner Sam Jones (Zachary Quinto). Meanwhile, Dr. Hannah Wells (Billie Lourd) investigates a new disease spreading from Fire Island while Cabaret singer Kathy Pizzaz (Patti LuPone) handles decreasing audiences at her local bathhouse venue.

=== Delicate (2023–2024) ===
Based on Danielle Valentine's novel Delicate Condition, this season is unique as the first to be adapted from a novel rather than an original storyline. Set in 2023 and 2024, the plot centers around Anna Victoria Alcott (Emma Roberts), an A-list movie star living in New York City who is desperate to have a baby with her husband, Dexter 'Dex' Harding Jr. (Matt Czuchry). Despite concerns from her friend and PR manager, Siobhan Corbyn (Kim Kardashian), about the impact on her career during an already intense award season, Anna is determined to become a mother through IVF treatment with the prestigious Dr. Andrew Hill (Denis O'Hare). However, she starts experiencing strange and haunting visions, leading her to believe that someone (or something) is sabotaging her pregnancy attempts.

After believing she is being stalked by several women including the hysterical Ms. Mavis Preecher (Julie White), the mysterious Ivy Ehrenreich (Cara Delevingne), and obsessive superfan Susan Pratt (Ashlie Atkinson); Anna and Dex temporarily relocate to The Hamptons and stay at a spare house owned by Dex's business partner, Talia Thompson (Juliana Canfield). Talia also enlists a bodyguard named Kamal (Maaz Ali) to watch over Anna while the house also has a mysterious manager named Nicolette (Michaela Jaé Rodriguez). Throw into the mix Dex and Talia's new business collaboration with the alluring artist, Sonia Shawcross (Annabelle Dexter-Jones), who looks a lot like Dex's dead ex-wife, Adeline Harding (also Dexter-Jones), and Anna is pushed to her limits of what is really happening to her.

=== 13 (2026) ===
The season takes place primarily in New York City, and follows Ben DeSoto (portrayed by Joey Pollari), a hospice caretaker suffering from triskaidekaphobia, who takes a strange job at The Apollyon, an eerie residential building inhabited by characters from seasons past.

== Production ==
=== Conception ===
What you saw in the finale was the end of the Harmon house. The second season of the show will be a brand-new home or building to haunt. Just like this year, every season of this show will have a beginning, middle and end. [The second season] won't be in L.A. It will obviously be in America, but in a completely different locale.

— Murphy on the anthology format

Creators Murphy and Falchuk began working on American Horror Story before their Fox series Glee began production. Murphy wanted to do the opposite of what he had done previously and thus began his work on the series. He stated: "I went from Nip/Tuck to Glee, so it made sense that I wanted to do something challenging and dark. And I always had loved, as Brad had, the horror genre. So it just was a natural for me." Falchuk was intrigued by the idea of putting a different angle on the horror genre, stating that their main goal in creating the series was to scare viewers. "You want people to be a little bit off balance afterwards," he said.

In February 2011, FX officially announced that it had ordered a pilot for a possible series from Ryan Murphy and Brad Falchuk, with both Murphy and Falchuk writing and Murphy directing. Dante Di Loreto was announced as executive producer. Production on the series began in April 2011. In July 2011, FX officially announced the project had been picked up to become a full series.

From the beginning, Murphy and Falchuk planned that each season of the series would tell a different story. After the first-season finale aired, Murphy spoke of his plans to change the cast and location for the second season. He said that some actors who starred in the first season would be returning. "The people that are coming back will be playing completely different characters, creatures, monsters, etc. [The Harmons'] stories are done. People who are coming back will be playing entirely new characters," he announced. In November 2012, FX chief executive, John Landgraf, described the unique format of the series stating: "[T]he notion of doing an anthological series of miniseries with a repertory cast—has proven groundbreaking, wildly successful and will prove to be trendsetting."

At the 2013 PaleyFest, Falchuk compared the series to horror films: "It does demand a little bit of compassion at the end because you fall in love with these characters in a different way than you would in a movie," he said. "If you want to kill everybody in a movie except one person, you can kind of get away with that, but if you're looking to do a horror TV show, you have a different responsibility to the characters because the audience has a different affection for them."

Murphy then explained the process of planning a series' season takes about a year. "We come up with story first and then we come up with the characters," he said. "It is a repertory company, so we'll move people around and sometimes there won't yet be a role for somebody. Like when we started [the second season], I really had no idea that Dylan [McDermott] would be the person to play Sarah's son, but the deeper we got, I thought, that would work great."

In an August 2015 article for Entertainment Weekly, Murphy revealed that the show is producing two seasons a year, the first being broadcast late in the year and the second early in the next year. He explained, "We're doing something that we've never done before on the show where we're doing two different groups of writers rooms. Some of our writers will be bouncing around but a whole different group coming in late August. The next thing we're crafting up is very, very different than [Hotel]. Not smaller. But just not opulent. More rogue and more dark."

On October 20, 2026, American Horror Story was renewed for a fourteenth season, the first renewal for the series in almost seven years.

=== Casting ===
Connie Britton was the first to be cast in the series, portraying female lead Vivien Harmon on Murder House. Denis O'Hare joined second as Larry Harvey. Jessica Lange soon followed as Constance, her first regular role on television. Dylan McDermott joined the cast soon after Lange as the male lead Ben Harmon. Taissa Farmiga and Evan Peters were the last actors to be added to the main cast, portraying Violet Harmon and Tate Langdon, respectively.

In March 2012, Murphy revealed that the second season had been planned around Jessica Lange, who portrays Sister Jude, a sadistic nun who runs the asylum. Evan Peters, Sarah Paulson, Lily Rabe and Zachary Quinto also return to join the main cast. Peters portrays Kit Walker, an inmate accused of murdering his wife. Paulson portrays Lana Winters, a lesbian reporter who gets committed to the asylum because of her sexuality and intent to snoop around the sanitarium. Rabe's character is Sister Mary Eunice, clumsy second-in-charge to Sister Jude. Quinto portrays Dr. Thredson, a psychiatrist at the asylum. Lizzie Brocheré stars as Grace Bertrand, a character described originally as "a fierce, ferocious, extremely sexual, and dangerous wild-child sexpot", but the role was later heavily revamped. James Cromwell co-stars as Dr. Arthur Arden, who proclaims to be in charge of the asylum and performs dark experiments on its patients. Joseph Fiennes starred as Monsignor Timothy Howard, a possible love interest for Sister Jude.

For the third season, series executive producers and co-creators Ryan Murphy and Brad Falchuk stated that, as with the second season, "many actors" would return in different roles, beginning with Jessica Lange. Evan Peters and Sarah Paulson were confirmed to return, portraying Kyle Spencer and Cordelia Goode, respectively. Murphy added that Lange would portray a "real glamour-cat lady", later revealed to be named Fiona Goode. Taissa Farmiga, Violet in the first season, starred as Zoe Benson, a character that is involved in a prominent romance during the season. Lily Rabe co-starred as Misty Day. Recurring cast member Frances Conroy joined as a main cast member, playing the character of Myrtle Snow. Oscar-winning actress Kathy Bates was confirmed to co-star. It was first reported that she would portray "a woman who, at the start, is Lange's character's best friend, but will become her worst enemy", but this was altered. Murphy stated that Bates' character will be "five times worse than [her] Misery character" and is also inspired by a "true event". She portrayed Madame Delphine LaLaurie, an immortal racist. It was announced in May 2013 that Emma Roberts had been added to the cast. Roberts played Madison Montgomery, a "self-involved party girl". In July 2013, season one alum Denis O'Hare also joined the cast in an unknown role, later revealed as Spalding.

In November 2013, Ryan Murphy confirmed that Jessica Lange would be returning for a fourth season, although in a reduced capacity. It was later revealed she would be playing freak show owner Elsa Mars. Kathy Bates returned in a main role, portraying bearded lady Ethel Darling. On March 29, 2014, Murphy announced that Sarah Paulson, Evan Peters, Frances Conroy, Emma Roberts, Denis O'Hare, and Angela Bassett would all return for the fourth season. Paulson portrayed conjoined sisters Bette and Dot Tattler; Peters portrayed "Lobster Boy" Jimmy Darling; Conroy played the well-off Gloria Mott; Bassett portrayed three-breasted hermaphrodite Desiree Dupree; and O'Hare played Stanley, a conman working with Roberts' Maggie Esmerelda. At PaleyFest 2014, it was revealed that Michael Chiklis would be joining the cast as Dell Toledo, the father of Jimmy, ex-husband of Ethel, and current husband of Desiree. Finn Wittrock later joined the main cast as Gloria's spoiled son, Dandy Mott.

For the series' fifth cycle, singer-songwriter Lady Gaga was announced as the first and newest main cast member on February 25, 2015. After a special guest appearance on the previous season, Matt Bomer joined the fifth season's cast along with series newcomer Cheyenne Jackson during PaleyFest 2015. Chloë Sevigny and Wes Bentley were promoted as main cast members, after they appear as recurring special guests in Asylum and Freak Show, respectively. Murphy later announced the returns of Kathy Bates, Sarah Paulson, Evan Peters and Angela Bassett. In June 2015, it was announced Denis O'Hare would also return for the fifth season. In August 2015, Murphy announced the character roles for the cast: Gaga's Elizabeth Johnson also known as "the Countess", a fashionista vampiress who owns the Hotel Cortez; Jackson's Will Drake, a desperate fashion designer; O'Hare's Liz Taylor, a transgender bartender who works at the hotel's Blue Parrot Lounge bar; Sevigny's Alex Lowe, a pediatrician who was the wife of Bentley's John Lowe, a detective who investigates the murders inside the hotel; Bomer's Donovan, the lover to the Countess whom often had conflict with his mother and hotel manager, Bates' Iris; Bassett's Ramona Royale, a former actress who was the former lover of Elizabeth; Paulson's Sally, a drug addict who had a rivalry with Iris and forms a bond with John since his visit in the hotel. Peters co-starred as serial killer James Patrick March and the original hotelier of the Hotel Cortez.

In February 2016, Angela Bassett confirmed she would return to join the main cast of the sixth season during an interview with Larry King. Denis O'Hare announced that he would also appear in the season in a May 2016 interview. In June 2016, Cheyenne Jackson, Evan Peters, Wes Bentley, and Kathy Bates announced their returns for the sixth season. In August 2016, Sarah Paulson announced that she would return to the series in the sixth season and Ryan Murphy announced that Oscar winner Cuba Gooding Jr. had joined the main cast. In September 2016, the full main cast was announced after the first episode with the inclusion of André Holland and returning series veteran Lily Rabe. On Halloween 2016, Murphy announced that Paulson's Asylum character, Lana Winters would also appear in the series after the recent appearance of the actress' first role Billie Dean Howard from Murder House in the final episode of the fifth season.

For the seventh season, Paulson and Peters were set to return to the series, as announced during the Winter 2017 TCA Press Tour. Billie Lourd, who made her breakout appearance with Murphy in 2015, was confirmed to join the main cast in April, while Jackson was the next series regular to return in the next month. In June, Alison Pill was announced to co-star in the season, portraying the partner of Paulson's character.

In October 2017, Paulson announced that she would return for the series' eighth cycle. The next year, Peters was announced to appear in the main cast while Bates returned to the series after Roanoke, leading the season with Paulson. Jackson confirmed he would return while Adina Porter was promoted to the series' main cast after her first appearance in Murder House as well as Leslie Grossman since Cult. Lourd later returned to the main cast the next month. On June, Roberts announced that she would reprise her Coven character Madison Montgomery in the eighth season and will be part of the main cast. The next month, Australian actor Cody Fern was cast as the adult Michael Langdon, who was last seen at the first series' final episode.

In February 2019, Ryan Murphy revealed via his Instagram that Emma Roberts would be returning to the show for its ninth season along with new cast member, Gus Kenworthy. In July 2019, Murphy, again through his Instagram, announced the addition of Pose cast member, Angelica Ross, to the cast of the ninth season. Later that month, Cody Fern, Leslie Grossman, Billie Lourd were confirmed to return to the series, with John Carroll Lynch being promoted to the main cast after his third appearance in Cult, also with newcomers Zach Villa and Matthew Morrison.

In January 2020, Paulson herself confirmed that she would return to the show for its tenth installment in a lead role, following her absence in 1984. On February 26, Ryan Murphy announced via Instagram the cast of season 10, which confirmed the return of Kathy Bates, Evan Peters, Lily Rabe, Finn Wittrock, Adina Porter, Leslie Grossman, Billie Lourd, and Angelica Ross, as well as the addition of series newcomer Macaulay Culkin.

In August 2022, Paulson revealed that she doubts that she will return for any future seasons.

On April 6, 2023, it was reported that Matt Czuchry has joined the cast of the twelfth season after the cancellation of The Resident. On April 10, 2023, Ryan Murphy confirmed in an interview that Kim Kardashian would lead the twelfth season alongside Emma Roberts. On April 24, 2023, it was reported that Cara Delevingne has joined the cast of the twelfth season after being spotted filming scenes with Roberts. On April 28, 2023, it was reported that Annabelle Dexter-Jones and MJ Rodriguez has joined the cast of the season.

In October 2025, Paulson, Peters, Bassett, Bates, Roberts, Lourd, Grossman, and Lange were all confirmed to return for the thirteenth season alongside Gabourey Sidibe, who previously guest-starred in multiple seasons, with Ariana Grande also joining the cast. In February 2026, John Waters joined the cast, while Joey Pollari joined in April and both and Alex Consani, Paul Anthony Kelly and Madelaine Petsch joined in May. In July 2026, Grande was reported to no longer be appearing in the series due to scheduling conflicts.

=== Filming ===
Production and shooting for the first season began on 27 July 2011. The pilot episode was shot on location at the Rosenheim Mansion in Country Club Park, Los Angeles, California, which serves as the haunted house and crime scene in the series. Designed and built in 1908 by Alfred Rosenheim, the president of the American Institute of Architects' Los Angeles chapter, the Tudor or Collegiate Gothic-style single family home was previously used as a convent. The first season was filmed on sets which are an exact replica of the house. Details such as Louis Comfort Tiffany stained glass windows and hammered bronze light fixtures were recreated to preserve the look of the house.

Production and shooting for the second season began in late July 2012 for a scheduled premiere in mid October. The exteriors for the second season were filmed in Hidden Valley, Ventura County, California, a rural area outside Los Angeles, although the season took place in Massachusetts.

Principal photography for the third season began on July 23, 2013, in New Orleans, Louisiana. It was first reported that the season would be filmed in multiple locations, but filming primarily took place in New Orleans.

Principal photography for the fourth season began on July 15, 2014, in New Orleans, though the story takes place in Jupiter, Florida.

Principal photography for the fifth season began on July 14, 2015, in Los Angeles, California, where the story also takes place. Murphy revealed a six-story hotel set was being built on the Fox lot. A dummy set of the hotel was built at the 2015 San Diego Comic-Con, showing an Art Deco-style building from the 1920s, inspired by the old Hollywood era.

Filming for the sixth season began on July 6, 2016, at Santa Clarita, California. Set constructions include a colonial settler home to speculate the disappearance of the Roanoke Colony.

Filming for the seventh season was originally planned to begin in Orange, California, in June 2017 before it was moved to May instead.

Filming for the eighth season began on June 16, 2018. It was filmed in multiple locations.

On July 11, 2019, Murphy confirmed that the ninth season had begun filming.

Season 10 was originally supposed to film in March 2020, but was delayed to the Fall due to COVID-19. On November 2, Sarah Paulson confirmed via Instagram livestream that filming is set to begin either November 9, 10, or 11. On December 2, Lily Rabe confirmed that filming had begun. Filming began on December 2, 2020. The tenth season is split into two narrative parts that aired consecutively, each of which also has its own subtitle; Red Tide for the first six episodes, and Death Valley for the latter four.

Season 12 began filming on April 24, 2023. On May 4, 2023, it was reported that filming for the twelfth season had shut down due to the WGA writers strike. On the same day, it was reported that production resumed and that the cast and crew were using a back entrance to enter the studio and avoid crossing the picket line. On May 10, 2023, it was announced that the production of the season was halted due to the strike. Filming once again continued and wrapped in late October.

Season 13 began filming on April 6, 2026 and wrapped in July, 27, 2026.

== Promotion ==
As part of the promotion for the series, FX launched a "House Call" campaign, in which viewers at home could sign up and come face-to-face with a character from the series. Prior to the series premiere, FX released several clues to shine light on the series. They were offered on the show's official YouTube channel. Ten clues were released. In September 2011, FX launched a website which allows visitors to tour the Murder House throughout the decades and look for clues.

In August 2012, the first promo for the second season was released on the American Horror Story Facebook page entitled "Special Delivery", in which a nun carries a couple of buckets filled with body parts through a field. As a church bell rings, the nun empties one bucket's bloody contents, leaving the empty bucket behind, and resumes her trek. Over 20 subsequent teasers were released. Four photos were also released on EW.com.

Two televised teasers, titled "Meet the Residents", were released on August 31, 2012. They feature the patients and some staff (such as Dr. Thredson, played by Zachary Quinto, and Sister Mary Eunice, played by Lily Rabe) lying in twin beds and dealing with their individual issues as the heads of the asylum (Jessica Lange, Joseph Fiennes and James Cromwell) look on. The song "Que Sera, Sera", mixed with the show's theme music, plays. To promote Cult, a competition was set up where fans who donated to the Children's Hospital Los Angeles could get a chance to get a walk-on role in an episode, and lunch with Evan Peters.

Overall, premises and characters for each season are typically kept under wraps until soon before premiers and are alluded to with brief and vague teaser trailers.

In October 2020, the owners of the historic Alfred Rosenheim Mansion "The Murder House" hosted a virtual paranormal investigation. The house had been featured in several films, TV shows, and music videos including the first season of American Horror Story. A production crew set up 15 cameras throughout the home and featured Hollywood psychic Patti Negri, exorcist Bishop James Long, Michelle Belanger, and other notable guests.

=== Universal's Halloween Horror Nights ===
On August 16, 2016, FX announced a deal had been struck to feature an American Horror Story maze at Universal Studios Hollywood and Universal Orlando for their Halloween Horror Nights events. The maze featured sets and themes from Murder House, Freak Show, and Hotel. Universal Parks & Resorts said of the experience, "Twisted scenes from Murder House will unleash the evil spirits that possess the Harmon estate, spiraling guests through decades of the tortured dead who previously resided there.

In Freak Show, guests joined a troupe of biological misfits in a sinister sideshow where they were stalked by the murderous and deformed Twisty the Clown. Finally, guests succumbed to the warped desires of the Countess after checking into the haunted Hotel Cortez, conceived from the beginning as a torture chamber for its customers." In 2017, the show returned as haunted attractions to both parks, with Universal Orlando having an attraction based on Asylum, Coven, and Roanoke, and Universal Studios Hollywood basing their attraction solely on Roanoke.

In December 2017, The Walt Disney Company announced it would purchase 21st Century Fox which included the 20th Century Fox film and TV assets. The deal was finalized in March 2019, making 20th Century Fox officially part of The Walt Disney Studios. As Disney and Universal are bitter rivals in the theme park business, especially for their Central Florida properties, this would likely end the franchise's presence in Halloween Horror Nights at Universal parks.

=== The Night Bites Bakery ===
On July 14, 2021, an American Horror Story themed bakery opened in New York's Meatpacking District in Manhattan until July 24, 2021, to celebrate the release of spin-off American Horror Stories and the tenth season titled Double Feature. Guests had to be over the age of 18 to enter the bakery and had to make reservations for 30 minute visits. It featured sweet treats inspired by the series, as well as unique designs and characters based on past installments of American Horror Story and American Horror Stories. After placing an order, the Rubber Woman, introduced in the first episode of American Horror Stories, delivered the order through a secret window. It opened in Los Angeles from August 4, 2021, until August 14, 2021, in Beverly Grove. The bakery opened in Provincetown, Massachusetts, where the first part of the tenth season were filmed, at Pat's Happy Park on September 1, 2021, until September 4, 2021.

== Reception ==
=== Critical response ===
Critical response of American Horror Story
| Season | Rotten Tomatoes | Metacritic |
|---|---|---|
| Murder House | 72% (148 reviews) | 62 (30 reviews) |
| Asylum | 84% (220 reviews) | 65 (23 reviews) |
| Coven | 85% (221 reviews) | 71 (24 reviews) |
| Freak Show | 77% (202 reviews) | 69 (19 reviews) |
| Hotel | 64% (215 reviews) | 60 (24 reviews) |
| Roanoke | 74% (160 reviews) | 72 (9 reviews) |
| Cult | 73% (218 reviews) | 66 (24 reviews) |
| Apocalypse | 79% (194 reviews) | 63 (6 reviews) |
| 1984 | 88% (170 reviews) | —N/a |
| Double Feature | 80% (61 reviews) | —N/a |
| NYC | 71% (7 reviews) | —N/a |
| Delicate | 77% (13 reviews) | 57 (8 reviews) |
| 13 | 55% (11 reviews) | 58 (4 reviews) |

The first season, American Horror Story: Murder House, received generally positive reviews from critics. Review aggregator Rotten Tomatoes reported that 72% of 148 critics gave the first season a positive review. The site's consensus stated: "Convoluted yet effective, American Horror Story is strange, gory, and twisted enough to keep viewers hooked." The first season scored 62 out of 100 on Metacritic based on 30 reviews, indicating generally favorable reviews. Ken Tucker from Entertainment Weekly awarded the pilot episode a B+, stating: "AHS is pretty much all scare, all the time: a whole lotta screams, sex, jolts, mashed faces, psychotic behavior, and dead babies." Hank Stuever from The Washington Post said in his review that: "Overdoing things is one of Murphy's trademark flaws, but this show has a captivating style and giddy gross-outs." Not all reviews were favorable: Alan Sepinwall of HitFix gave the series a D−, saying: "It is so far over the top that the top is a microscopic speck in its rearview mirror, and so full of strange sounds, sights and characters that you likely won't forget it—even though many of you will wish you could." Sepinwall would later go on to call it one of the worst TV shows of 2011. The Los Angeles Times' Mary McNamara gave it a mixed review, stating that it "collapses into camp... upon more than one occasion" but also noting that it is "hard to look away."

The second season, American Horror Story: Asylum, received critical acclaim from critics. Review aggregator Rotten Tomatoes reported that 84% of 220 critics gave the season a positive review. The site's consensus is: "American Horror Story: Asylum crosses boundaries to shock and scare with sexy subplots and some innovative takes on current social issues." It scored 65 out of 100 on Metacritic based on 23 reviews, indicating generally favorable reviews. James Poniewozik from Time stated: "AHS: Asylum feels like a more focused, if equally frenetic, screamfest. It's also gorgeously realized, with a vision of its '60s institution setting so detailed you can smell the stale air and incense." Maureen Ryan of The Huffington Post said: "It's to the credit of Asylum's writers, directors and cast that the emotional pain of the characters often feels as real as their uncertainty and terror." Verne Gay from Newsday gave the season a C grade, stating it "has some good special effects, just not much of a story to hang them on." Linda Stasi of the New York Post thought the season was "over the top," adding: "I need to enter [an asylum] myself after two hours of this craziness."

The third season, American Horror Story: Coven, received critical acclaim from critics. Review aggregator Rotten Tomatoes reported that 85% of 221 critics gave the season a positive review. The site's consensus reads: "A noteworthy ensemble cast combined with creepy storytelling and campy, outrageous thrills make American Horror Story: Coven a potently structured fright-fest." It scored 71 out of 100 on Metacritic based on 24 reviews, the second-highest score for any season, after Roanoke, on that site. In their post-season reviews, The Michigan Daily gave Coven a B+, saying, "And while its conclusion, appropriately titled "The Seven Wonders", never quite matched the high standard it set for itself throughout the season, Coven's reputation will nonetheless remain a solid one." Not all reviews were positive, however, with criticism focused on both the story and character arcs in the second half of the season. The A.V. Club gave this season the low rating of a D+, with critic Emily VanDerWerff remarking: "It lurched drunkenly from idea to idea, never settling on one long enough to build anything of worth."

The fourth season, American Horror Story: Freak Show, received mostly positive reviews from critics. Review aggregator Rotten Tomatoes reports that 77% of 202 critics gave the season a positive review. The site's consensus is: "Though it may turn off new viewers unaccustomed to its unabashed weirdness, Freak Show still brings the thrills, thanks to its reliably stylish presentation and game cast." This season was Jessica Lange's final major performance on the show.

The fifth season, American Horror Story: Hotel, received more mixed reviews from critics, in comparison to its predecessors. Rotten Tomatoes reports that 64% of 215 critics gave the season a positive review. The site's consensus is: "Favoring garish style over effective storytelling, the fifth American Horror Story strands a talented cast at Ryan Murphy's Hotel." Hotel scored a 60 out of 100 on Metacritic based on 24 reviews, indicating mixed or average reviews. Some praise the season for its increased amount of horror elements and experimentation, while many believe that Jessica Lange's departure negatively impacted the show's ratings and the overall character of the series moving forward. Dan Fienberg of The Hollywood Reporter gave a positive review, writing, "Early on, Hotel hasn't hooked me with its storytelling, but it's always fun to see what the series does with its repertory acting company and with new additions. Throw in the normal grotesquerie and visual panache, and that should keep me going for a while, even if all of the humor appears to have been funneled into Scream Queens." On the other hand, Matt Zoller Seitz of New York Magazine found the season "confusing, tedious, annoyingly precious, and often ostentatiously brutal", but also praised it for being "darkly beautiful, deeply weird, and (sometimes) exhilarating." Although Scott D. Pierce from The Salt Lake Tribune praised the production design and the cinematography, he said "the storytelling is derivative; the scares are non-existent; and it's all about style without much substance." Mike Hale from The New York Times complained that it "suffers from the absence of Jessica Lange". IGN's Matt Fowler gave a rating of 5.9 out of 10, criticizing the season as "mediocre" and concluding "all weight and meaning is gone."

The sixth season, American Horror Story: Roanoke, received mostly positive reviews from critics. Rotten Tomatoes reports that 74% of 160 critics gave the season a positive review. The site's consensus is: "American Horror Story: My Roanoke Nightmare takes a surprising turn away from prior AHS formats, revisiting the deliberate pace of earlier seasons on a spookier, smaller scale, even if the true-crime format feels overdone." It scored a 72 on Metacritic based on nine reviews, making it the highest-scored season on that site.

The seventh season, American Horror Story: Cult, received mostly positive reviews from critics. Rotten Tomatoes reports that 73% of 218 critics gave the season a positive review. The site's consensus is: "American Horror Story: Cult intrigues with timely, over-the-top creepiness – and lots of clowns – despite being hampered by broad political generalizations and occasional holes in the narrative's logic." It scored a 66 on Metacritic based on 24 reviews, indicating generally favorable reviews.

The eighth season, American Horror Story: Apocalypse, received positive reviews from critics, with some considering it as an improvement over the recent seasons. Rotten Tomatoes reports that 79% of 194 critics gave the season a positive review. The site's consensus is: "Ryan Murphy and his murderers' row of witchy performers literally save the world—and franchise—in Apocalypse, the series most ambitious crossover swing yet." It scored a 63 on Metacritic based on six reviews, indicating generally favorable reviews.

The ninth season, American Horror Story: 1984, received critical acclaim. Rotten Tomatoes reports that 88% of 170 critics gave the season a positive review, making it the highest-scored season on that site. The site's consensus is: "A near-perfect blend of slasher tropes and American Horror Story's trademark twists, 1984 is a bloody good time."

The tenth season, American Horror Story: Double Feature, received positive reviews. The first part of the season, Red Tide, received very positive reviews from critics, while the finale was received negatively. The second part, Death Valley, received mixed-to-positive reviews. Rotten Tomatoes reports an 80% approval rating, based on 61 reviews for the season, with an average rating of 9.00/10. The site's consensus is: "Though its second tale is still a mystery, the first half of Double Feature proves a spine-tingling good time with terrific performances – especially from the spectacular Leslie Grossman." Liz Shannon Miller of Collider stated Double Feature manages to be one of the best American Horror Story seasons ever created, writing, "For 10 seasons now, American Horror Story has represented the wildest excesses of the Ryan Murphy brand — incredible casts, deliberately outlandish premises and plots, and experiments in form which explode the ideas of what's possible on television." Riley Runnells of The Post praised the performances of the actors and complimented the writing, claiming, "The vibe of the show is almost more of a movie style and more professional-seeming than any other season so far. Not only are there incredible acting and technical moments, but the writing seems more polished and original than the more recent seasons of the show – especially the fresh take on a vampire plot." Andy Swift of TVLine applauded the performances of the cast members and stated the season succeeds to be terrifying, saying, "Chilling, compelling and wonderfully acted, Double Feature already feels like a return to form for the long-running franchise." Kayla Cobb of Decider said Double Feature succeeds to be frightening across its jumpscares and characters, while praising the performances of the actors, stating, "If you're into American Horror Story for the horror, you're going to have a blast. If not, then Double Feature has some killer performances from your favorites that you won't want to miss." Matt Fowler of IGN rated the season 7 out of 10, stating, "The first two episodes of the first half of American Horror Story: Double Feature start slow, but then amplify the intrigue with an interesting spin on vampires." Ron Hogan of Den of Geek rated the season 3 out of 5 stars, saying, "There are some very clever transitions between scenes, and the episode has good flow without getting slowed down during exposition dumps. The effects are used as appropriate punchlines, and American Horror Story is never shy about blood and gore when necessary. It (the half-season, not the episode) just felt a little too rushed, with too many ideas and not quite enough development."

The eleventh season, American Horror Story: NYC, received mostly positive reviews from critics. Rotten Tomatoes reports that 71% of seven critics gave the season a positive review.

The twelfth season, American Horror Story: Delicate, holds a Rotten Tomatoes approval rating of 77% with an average rating of 4.6/10, based on 13 critic reviews. The site's consensus reads: "American Horror Story reins in its Grand Guignol excess for a softer touch in Delicate, refreshing the series' formula with a slow-burn chiller about the anxieties of pregnancy. Metacritic gave it a score of 51 out of 100 based on reviews from 6 critics, indicating "mixed or average reviews".

Ryan Murphy and Brad Falchuk have been credited with creating a series that increases both the LGBT creators and storylines in the industry. Theresa L. Geller and Anna Marie Banker have stated that Murphy and Falchuk utilize "the formal structure of the serialized anthology...to present serial narratives made by and about 'queers,' openly subverting gender and sexual norms that define the majority of television." In the journal Gender Forum, Robert Sevenich further acknowledges that "American Horror Story is a unique and challenging text that confronts issues of queer visibility, provides queer performers and creators a vehicle to contribute to cultural conversations, and gives audiences a lens to glean meaning."

== Ratings ==
The pilot episode of American Horror Story was watched by 3.2 million viewers and averaged a 1.6 rating in the 18–49 years adult demographic, the most sought after by advertisers. These were the best numbers FX had ever received for a series premiere. The episode was seen by 3.2 million total viewers in 59 countries. Ratings increased as the season progressed, with the season finale being watched by 3.22 million viewers and receiving a 1.7 ratings share in the 18–49 years adult demographic.

The series premiere aired in November 2011 across Europe and Latin America on Fox International Channels, and ranked as first or second most watched telecast in its timeslot among all paid television in most metered markets. "Numbers so strong, it's scary. American Horror Story has brought droves of new viewers to a killer global lineup", said Hernan Lopez, the president of Fox International Channels.

The second season's premiere gained a 2.2 18–49 ratings share and gathered 3.85 million viewers, marking the highest numbers for the series. By the season's sixth episode, the numbers dropped to a series-low 0.9 18–49 ratings share and 1.89 million viewers. They rebounded to above two million viewers for the subsequent episodes, and reached 2.29 million viewers for the season's finale. The premiere of the fifth season of the series became the second most-watched telecast in the network's history, only behind the premiere episode of the previous season, which was watched by 6.13 million viewers.

The show was renewed for another season. John Landgraf, the CEO of the network, commented on the show's success by saying that American Horror Story, the network's highest rated series, "has unquestionably joined the ranks of television's landmark series." In 2016, a study by The New York Times of the 50 TV shows with the most Facebook Likes found that "unlike a lot of shows about the supernatural", American Horror Story was "more popular in cities, but also throughout parts of the Southwest". JustWatch, a guide to streaming content with access to data from more than 20 million users around the world, reported that American Horror Story was the eighth most-streamed horror show in Canada during the Halloween period between October 1, 2022, and October 13, 2025.

In September 2026, Nielsen Media Research reported that from May 2024 to August 2026 Americans spent more than 7 billion minutes streaming the show on Hulu. Coven had the highest number of total minutes viewed (1.18 billion), while Murder House had the highest average minutes viewed per episode (95.6 million).

Viewership and ratings per season of American Horror Story
| Season | Timeslot (ET) | Episodes | First aired | | Last aired | | TV season | Avg. viewers (millions) | Avg. 18–49 rating |
| Season | Timeslot (ET) | Episodes | Date | Viewers (millions) | Date | Viewers (millions) | TV season | Avg. viewers (millions) | Avg. 18–49 rating |
|---|---|---|---|---|---|---|---|---|---|
| 1 | Wednesday 10:00 p.m. | 12 | October 5, 2011 | 3.18 | December 21, 2011 | 3.22 | 2011–12 | N/A | N/A |
| 2 | Wednesday 10:00 p.m. | 13 | October 17, 2012 | 3.85 | January 23, 2013 | 2.29 | 2012–13 | 2.53 | 1.4 |
| 3 | Wednesday 10:00 p.m. | 13 | October 9, 2013 | 5.54 | January 29, 2014 | 4.24 | 2013–14 | 4.00 | 2.2 |
| 4 | Wednesday 10:00 p.m. | 13 | October 8, 2014 | 6.13 | January 21, 2015 | 3.27 | 2014–15 | 3.85 | 1.9 |
| 5 | Wednesday 10:00 p.m. | 12 | October 7, 2015 | 5.81 | January 13, 2016 | 2.24 | 2015–16 | 2.89 | 1.5 |
| 6 | Wednesday 10:00 p.m. | 10 | September 14, 2016 | 5.14 | November 16, 2016 | 2.45 | 2016–17 | 2.93 | 1.6 |
| 7 | Tuesday 10:00 p.m. | 11 | September 5, 2017 | 3.93 | November 14, 2017 | 1.97 | 2017–18 | 2.22 | 1.1 |
| 8 | Wednesday 10:00 p.m. | 10 | September 12, 2018 | 3.08 | November 14, 2018 | 1.83 | 2018–19 | 2.04 | 1.0 |
| 9 | Wednesday 10:00 p.m. | 9 | September 18, 2019 | 2.13 | November 13, 2019 | 1.08 | 2019–20 | 1.32 | 0.6 |
| 10 | Wednesday 10:00 p.m. | 10 | August 25, 2021 | 0.93 | October 20, 2021 | 0.58 | 2021–22 | 0.65 | 0.2 |
| 11 | Wednesday 10:00 p.m. | 10 | October 19, 2022 | 0.38 | November 16, 2022 | 0.19 | 2022–23 | 0.27 | 0.1 |
| 12 | Wednesday 10:00 p.m. | 9 | September 20, 2023 | 0.45 | April 24, 2024 | 0.23 | 2023–24 | 0.30 | 0.1 |
| 13 | Thursday 9:00 p.m. | 13 | September 24, 2026 | – | October 29, 2026 | – | 2026–27 | – | – |

== Accolades ==
American Horror Story has won over 100 awards out of its 359 award nominations. The franchise has garnered 28 Primetime Emmy Award nominations, with Jessica Lange winning for Outstanding Supporting Actress in a Miniseries or a Movie and for Outstanding Lead Actress in a Miniseries or a Movie, James Cromwell winning for Outstanding Supporting Actor in a Miniseries or a Movie, and Kathy Bates winning for Outstanding Supporting Actress in a Miniseries or a Movie. It received an additional 50 Creative Arts Emmy Award nominations, winning eleven times, including Outstanding Hairstyling for a Miniseries or a Movie, Outstanding Costumes for a Miniseries, Movie, or Special, Outstanding Sound Editing for a Miniseries, Movie, or Special, and Outstanding Prosthetic Makeup for a Series, Limited Series, Movie or a Special.

It has received nine Golden Globe Award nominations, with Lange winning for Best Supporting Actress in a Series, Miniseries or Television Film, and Lady Gaga winning for Best Actress in a Miniseries or Television Film. The series has received three Screen Actors Guild Award nominations, with Lange winning for Outstanding Performance by a Female Actor in a Drama Series. Additional accolades include eighteen Critics' Choice Television Awards nominations, with four wins, the GLAAD Media Award for Outstanding TV Miniseries, four Costume Designers Guild Awards nominations, winning three times, eight wins out of ten nominations at the Make-Up Artists and Hair Stylists Guild, five People's Choice Awards nominations, winning once, and eleven Satellite Awards nomination, with three wins.

In April 2019, the Television Academy decided that American Horror Story: Apocalypse would not qualify for the Limited Series categories, and instead be moved to Drama. American Horror Story was named the most in-demand horror TV show of 2018 by Guinness World Records, based on global TV demand data from Parrot Analytics. The series received the same accolade for 2019. It was honored again as the most in-demand horror TV show in 2023. In September 2021, American Horror Story was ranked fourth in a list of the top ten horror television series, based on a survey of over 2,500 fans conducted by Fandango's transactional digital service Vudu.

== Companion and spin-off series ==
=== American Crime Story ===
In October 2014, FX ordered a 10-episode companion series titled American Crime Story, developed by Scott Alexander and Larry Karaszewski. While each season of American Horror Story focuses on a new horror theme, each season of American Crime Story focuses on a new true crime story. The series features American Horror Story cast members Sarah Paulson, Connie Britton, Cuba Gooding Jr., Darren Criss, Finn Wittrock, Max Greenfield, Jon Jon Briones, Cody Fern and Billy Eichner. The first season premiered in February 2016, with the second season premiering in January 2018. A third season, titled Impeachment, focused on the Clinton–Lewinsky scandal, and aired in September 2021.

=== American Horror Stories ===
On May 11, 2020, Murphy revealed that a spin-off series named American Horror Stories was being developed; it would feature self-contained anthological episodes, instead of a season-long story arc as featured in American Horror Story. It was set to air on FX. On June 22, 2020, it was announced that American Horror Stories would stream on FX on Hulu instead. On August 4, 2020, it was announced that Sarah Paulson was set to be a director on the series. The first season featured actors who have appeared in American Horror Story.

Matt Bomer, Gavin Creel, Sierra McCormick, Paris Jackson, Belissa Escobedo, Merrin Dungey, Selena Sloan, Ashley Martin Carter, Valerie Loo, Kaia Gerber, Aaron Tveit and Celia Finkelstein star in the first two-episode story. Other American Horror Story alums that appear in the series include Naomi Grossman, John Carroll Lynch, Nico Greetham, Charles Melton, Billie Lourd, Chad James Buchanan, Cody Fern, Dylan McDermott, Jamie Brewer, Denis O'Hare, Matt Lasky, Gabourey Sidibe, Max Greenfield, Austin Woods, Seth Gabel, Rebecca Dayan, Cameron Cowperthwaite, Spencer Neville, Teddy Sears and Jeff Hiller along with many newcomers.

American Horror Stories premiered on July 15, 2021. Its first season consisted of seven episodes. A second season of eight episodes premiered on July 21, 2022. In April 2023, a third season was greenlit, which was released across October 26, 2023, and October 15, 2024.
