= The Wedding Song (2008 film) =

- French: Le Chant des mariées
- Directed by: Karin Albou
- Screenplay by: Karin Albou
- Produced by: Gloria Films
- Starring: Lizzie Brocheré; Olympe Borval; Simon Abkaria; Najib Oudghiri; Karin Albou
- Cinematography: Laurent Brunet
- Edited by: Camille Cotte
- Music by: François-Eudes Chanfrault
- Release date: 2008
- Running time: 100 minutes
- Countries: France; Tunisia
- Languages: French; Arabic

The Wedding Song (French: Le Chant des mariées; Arabic: اغنية العروس) is a 2008 Franco-Tunisian film. It is the second film of director-writer Karin Albou who also appeared in the film in a small role as the mother of lead character Myriam.

== Synopsis ==
Myriam (Lizzie Brocheré) and Nour (Olympe Borval) are two young Tunisian girls who live in the same poor tenement building in Tunis in the early 1940s. Jewish Myriam is allowed to go to school and given certain privileges while Nour, a native Tunisian, is banned by the French colonial authorities from being educated. At sixteen, Nour becomes engaged to one of her cousins, Khaled, though the marriage is delayed until Khaled can find work.

Then, in November 1942, German army invades. They spread propaganda to the native population telling them they will help to liberate their country from the French and blaming World War II on the Jews. After Americans bomb Tunisia, the Germans levy a heavy tax on the Jewish community.

Unable to pay the tax, Myriam's mother Tita introduces her to a much older, wealthy Jewish doctor, Raoul (Simon Abkarian). Myriam is horrified at the prospect of marrying him and lies to her mother and Raoul, claiming she is no longer a virgin. When Raoul questions her, he realizes that Myriam does not understand what intercourse is, and decides to go on with engagement preparations.

Nour learns that Khaled has obtained a job from the Germans and they are to be married soon. Shortly after, the German army, with Khaled acting as translator, search Myriam's home for money and jewels, assaulting her mother in the process. When Myriam tries to bring this up with Nour, Nour dismisses her.

The Germans order all poor Jews to be rounded up and forced into labour camps. Myriam calls Raoul a coward for not going, driving him to volunteer for the camps. They are married before he goes, though Myriam is too upset to consummate the marriage.

Myriam cannot enjoy the protection of Raoul's money, however, as Germans invade a Turkish bath and round up the women who have no veils, on the assumption that they are Jews. Nour, who is at the bath, pretends that Myriam is her sister and another woman hands her a veil. When Khaled learns of this he grows angry, telling Nour that the Jews helped the French to oppress the native Tunisian population and that the Koran forbids Jews and Muslims from being friends. Nour relates some of this to Myriam causing a rift between the two girls.

After an air strike comes too close to Raoul's compound, Myriam moves her mother, mother-in-law and herself back to the poor tenement building she comes from, but is still shunned by Nour. Nour decides to attempt to read the Koran to see what it says about Jews but cannot as she is illiterate. Her grandfather, seeing that she is trying to read, shows her a passage that says that people of all faith will enter heaven.

Nour marries Khaled and tells him that he is mistaken about his beliefs about Jews. Khaled forbids her from seeing Myriam but Nour tells him the decision ultimately rests with her.

During a night air raid Nour runs to an underground shelter. There she sees Myriam and the two girls run to each other and reunite. Together they begin praying.

== Development ==
Albou based the film on letters she had read from her Algerian grandmother that were written to her grandfather during World War II. She also stated that the character of Tita was the one most closely based on her grandmother.

Albou could not find a native Tunisian girl who was willing to appear on screen nude. She eventually broadened her search to include non Arabic speaking women and non-Arabs, finally settling on first time French actress Olympe Borval who learned Arabic for the role.

== Production ==
In reference to the scene in which Myriam has her pubis completely shaved, Lizzie Brocheré was offered a body double: "I had read the part in the script, but a hair removal scene is not necessarily a close-up," Brocheré says. "We were already in Tunisia when I realized how she would look. Afterwards, I wanted to do it, because it's a symbol".

== Awards ==
- Festival du Film de l’Outaouais 2009 (Quebec)
