= American Translation =

2011 French adult film

- Directed by: Pascal Arnold; Jean-Marc Barr
- Screenplay by: Pascal Arnold
- Produced by: Teddy Vermeulin; Pascal Arnold; Jean-Marc Barr
- Cinematography: Jean-Marc Barr
- Edited by: Teddy Vermeulin; Jean-Marc Barr
- Distributed by: LCJ Publishing and Productions
- Release date: 8 June 2011
- Running time: 109 minutes
- Country: France

American Translation is a 2011 French adult film directed by Pascal Arnold and Jean-Marc Barr and starring Pierre Perrier and Lizzie Brocheré.

== Synopsis ==
After a brief encounter in a hotel lobby Christophe and Aurore live out a carnal and passionate love. But Aurore discovers that Chris is actually a serial killer and this pushes her to question the choices made in life. Meanwhile, Chris starts luring men to have sex with him and kills them afterwards. She becomes torn between her love for him and her complicity in his life choices. The police eventually get on their trail.

== Cast ==
- Pierre Perrier: Chris
- Lizzie Brocheré: Aurore
- Jean-Marc Barr: William
- Gray Orsatelli: Matt
- Marc Rioufol: the priest
- Arthur Harel: Stéphane
- Thomas Rouer: Alex
- Astrid Vermeulin: Mrs. Levant
- Pierre-Yves Kiebbe: Mr. Levant
- Arnaud Koller: Henri
