= American Horror Story: Delicate =

Twelfth season of American Horror Story

- Season 12
- Promotional poster
- Showrunner: Halley Feiffer
- Starring: Emma Roberts; Matt Czuchry; Kim Kardashian; Annabelle Dexter-Jones; Michaela Jaé Rodriguez; Denis O'Hare; Cara Delevingne; Julie White; Maaz Ali
- No. of episodes: 9

Release
- Original network: FX
- Original release: September 20, 2023 – April 24, 2024

Season chronology
- ← Previous; NYC Next → 13

The twelfth season of the American horror anthology television series American Horror Story, subtitled Delicate, is based on Danielle Valentine's book Delicate Condition. It is the first season of the series to be based on a novel instead of having an original storyline, and the first season where series creators Ryan Murphy and Brad Falchuk did not serve as showrunners.

Halley Feiffer was the showrunner and wrote all nine episodes. The ensemble cast includes returnees Emma Roberts, Denis O'Hare, Dominic Burgess, Billie Lourd, Grace Gummer, and Leslie Grossman, with newcomers Matt Czuchry, Kim Kardashian, Annabelle Dexter-Jones, Michaela Jaé Rodriguez, Cara Delevingne, Julie White, Juliana Canfield, and Maaz Ali.

Created by Murphy and Falchuk for the cable network FX, the series is produced by 20th Television. Delicate aired from September 20, 2023, to April 24, 2024, and was split into two parts. The season garnered mixed reviews from critics and ranked among the top-streamed shows in the United States in late 2023. It was nominated for Best Horror Television Series at the 51st Saturn Awards and won Outstanding Contemporary Costumes at the 76th Primetime Creative Arts Emmy Awards.

== Cast and characters ==
=== Main ===
Delicate main cast

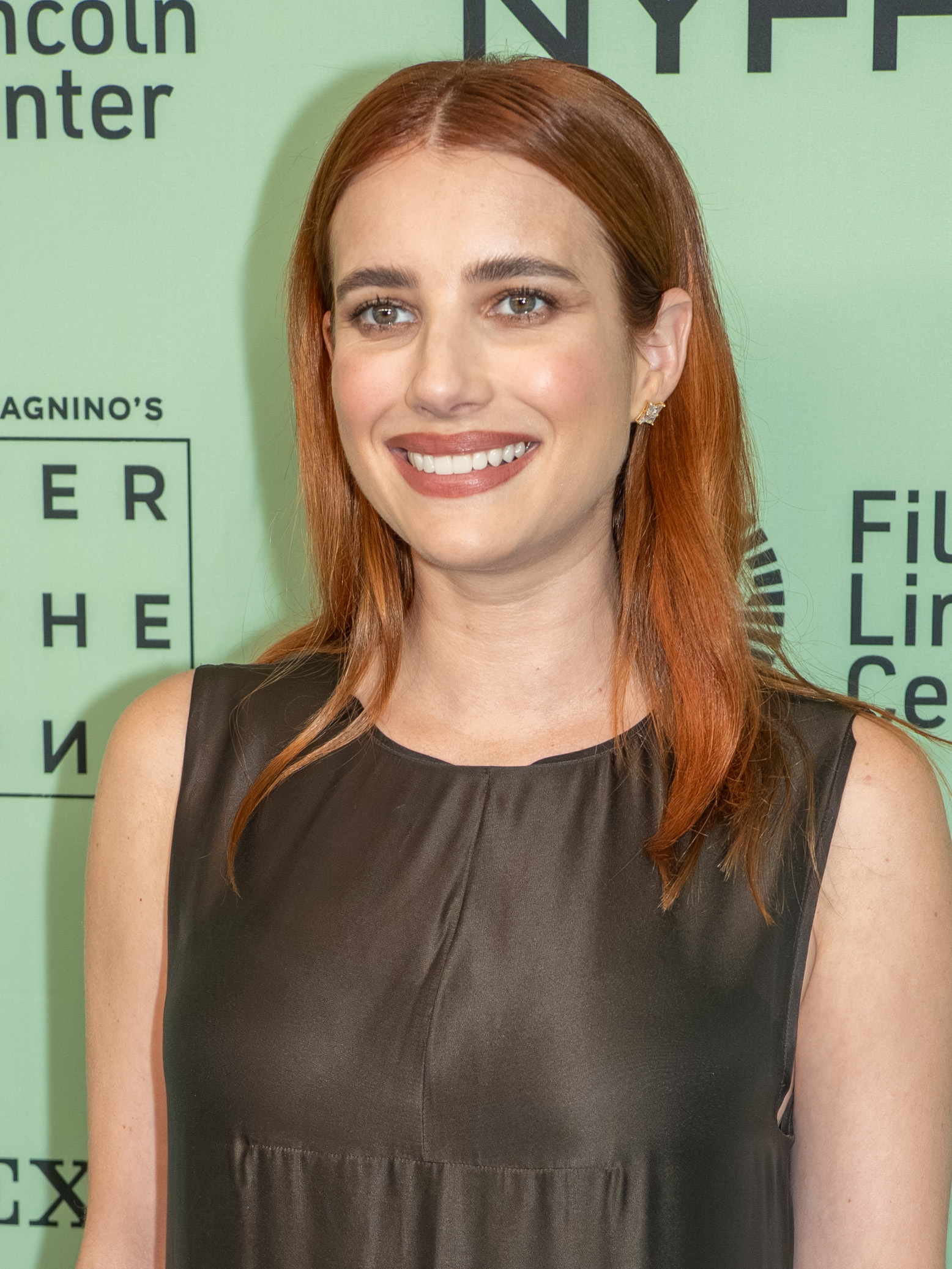
Emma Roberts

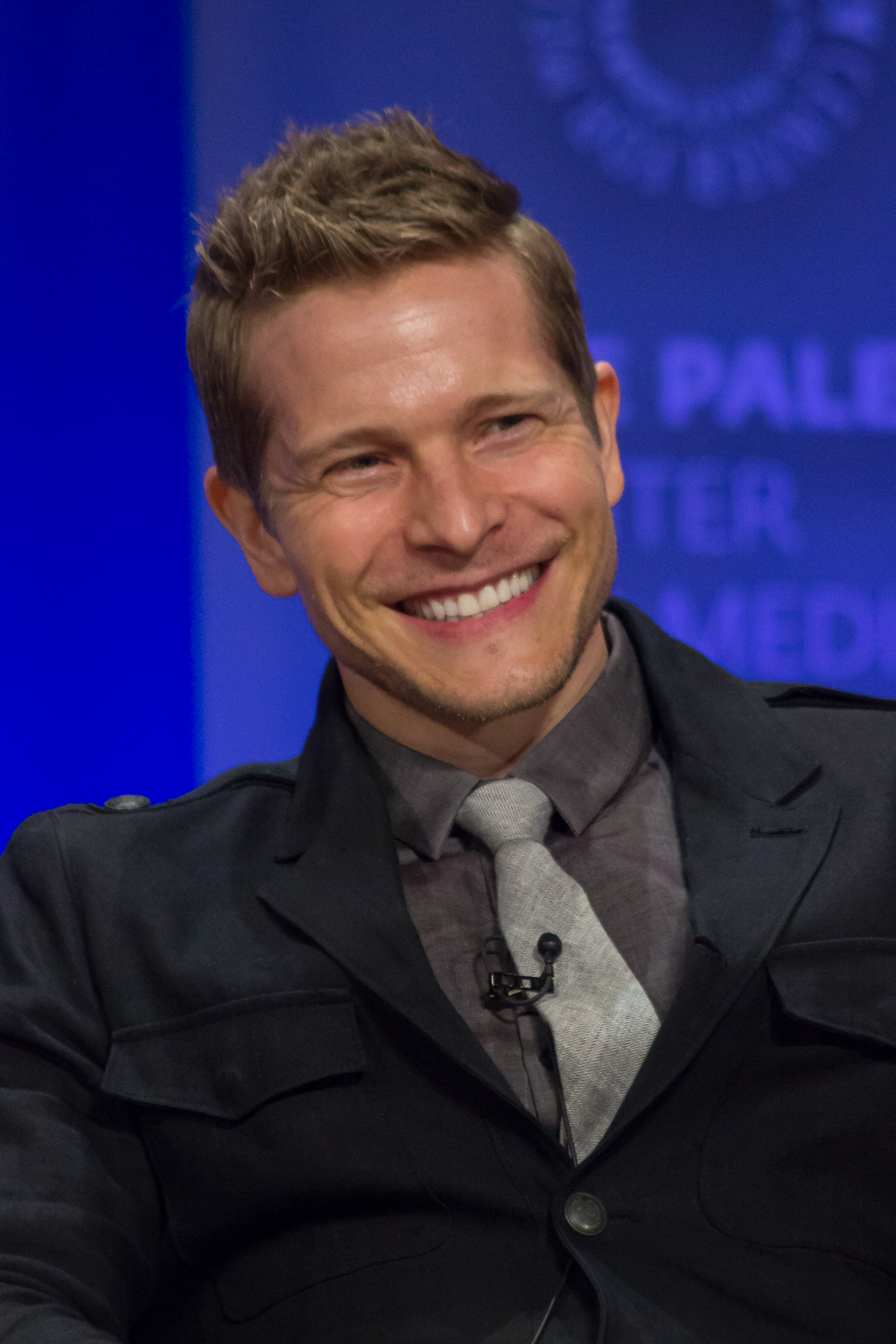
Matt Czuchry

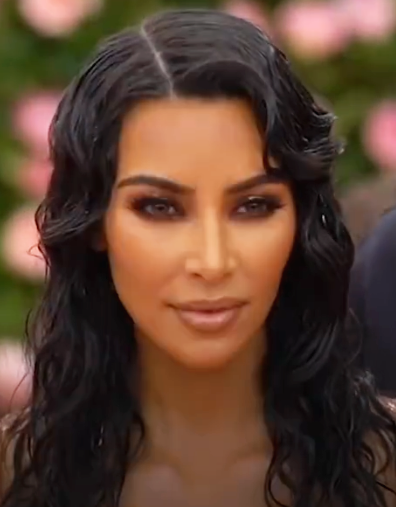
Kim Kardashian

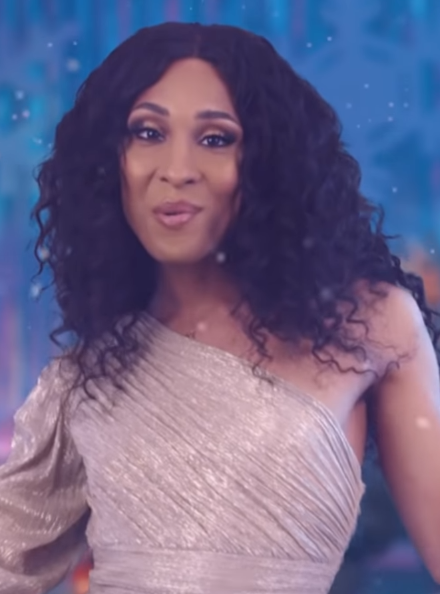
Michaela Jaé Rodriguez

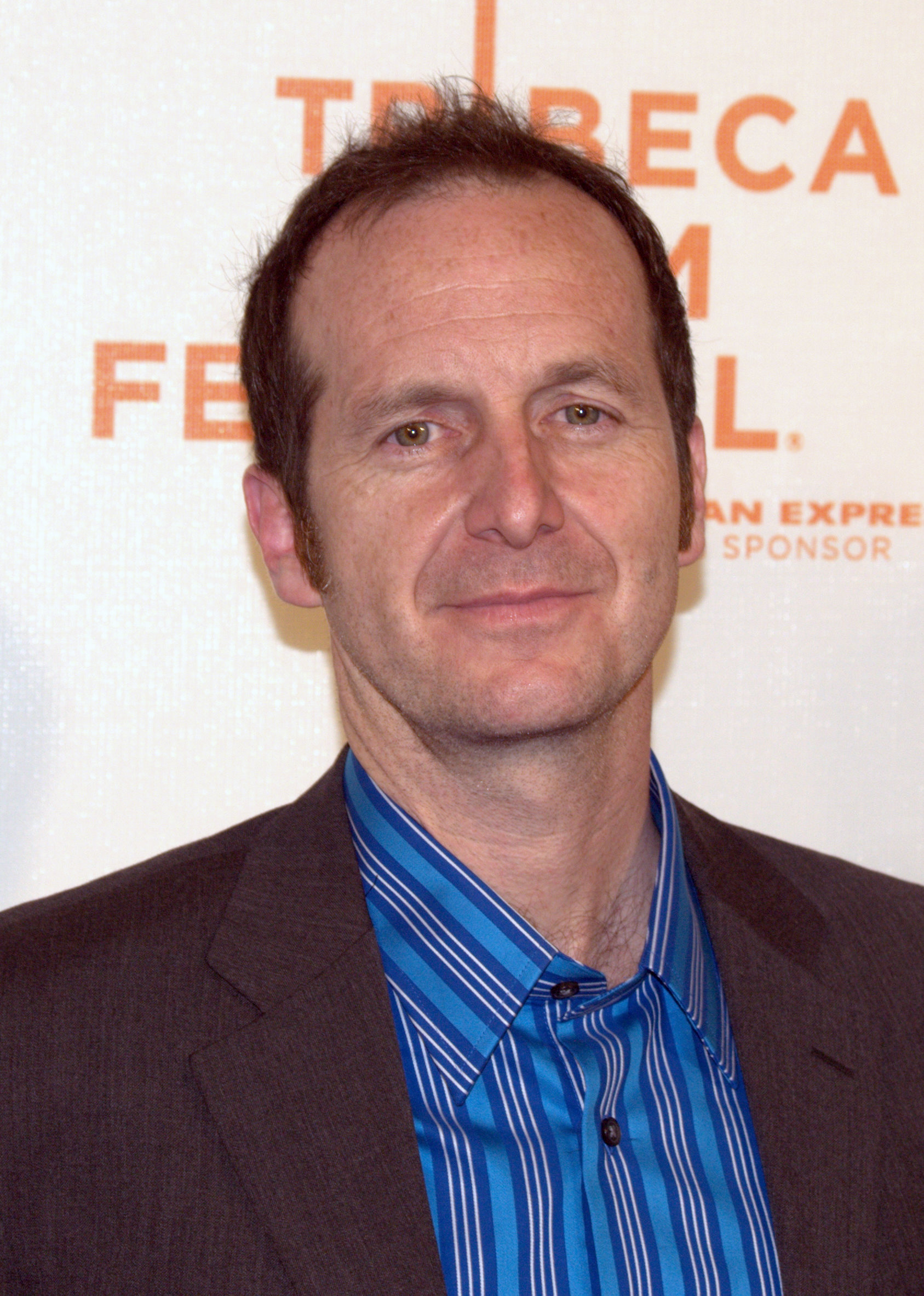
Denis O'Hare

Cara Delevingne

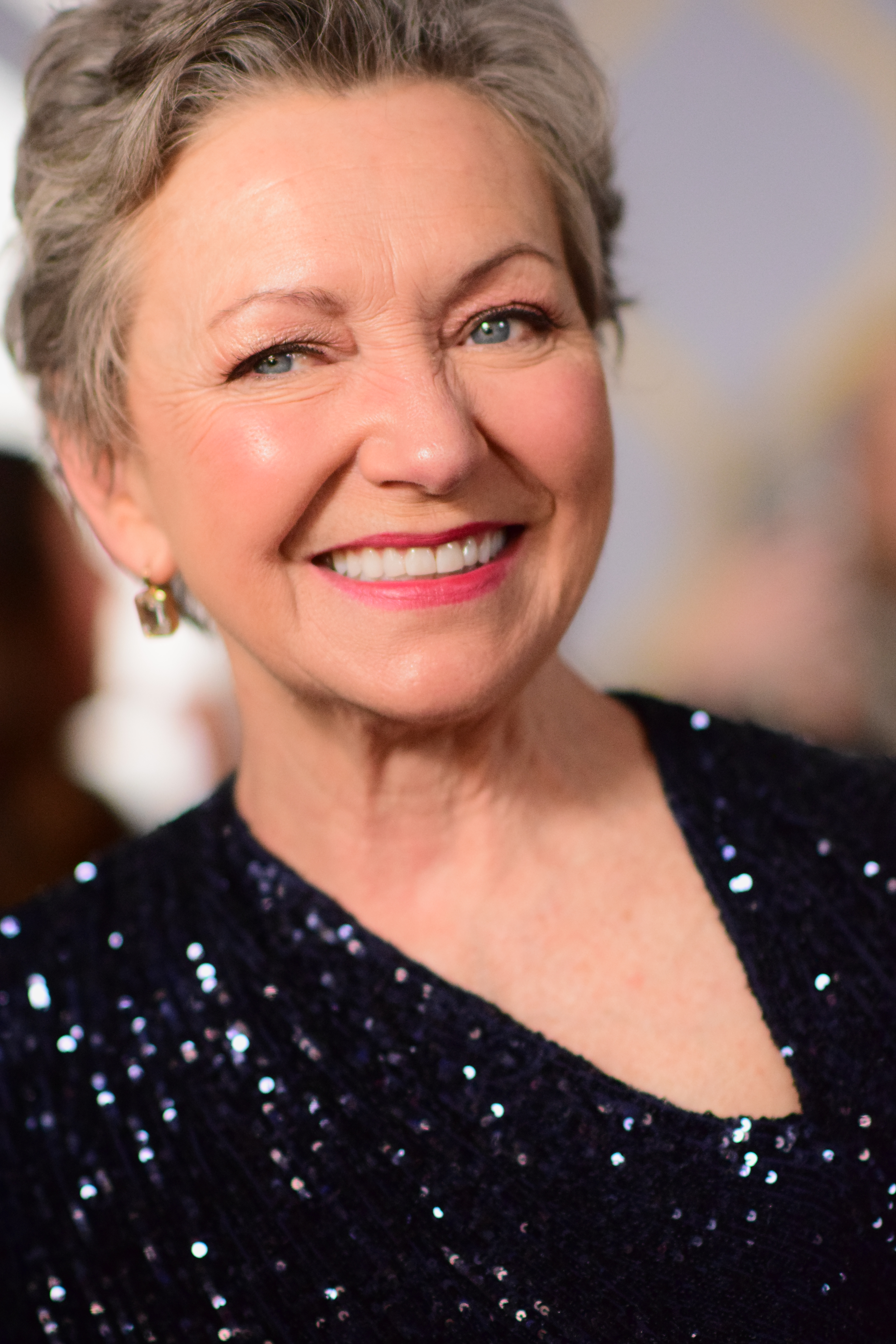
Julie White

- Emma Roberts as Anna Victoria Alcott
- Matt Czuchry as Dexter Harding Jr.
- Kim Kardashian as Siobhan Corbyn
- Annabelle Dexter-Jones as
  - Sonia Shawcross
  - Adeline Harding
- Michaela Jaé Rodriguez as Nicolette Smith
- Denis O'Hare as Dr. Andrew Hill
- Cara Delevingne as Ivy Ehrenreich
- Julie White as Ms. Mavis Preecher
- Maaz Ali as Kamal Aman

=== Recurring ===
- Juliana Canfield as Talia Thompson
- Tavi Gevinson as Cora
- Zo Tipp as Theo Thompson
- Taylor Richardson as Babette Eno
- Dominic Burgess as Hamish Moss
- Ashlie Atkinson as Susan Pratt
- Ryan Spahn as Derek
- Billie Lourd as Ashley
- Leslie Grossman as Ashleigh
- Debra Monk as Virginia Harding
- Grace Gummer as Margaret Alcott
- Reed Birney as Dexter Harding Sr.

=== Guest ===
- Andy Cohen as himself
- Zachary Quinto as himself (uncredited)
- Erin Murray as Elizabeth I
- Sophie von Haselberg as Mary I
- Taylor Schilling as herself (uncredited)
- Carter Hudson as Ned Alcott
- Hamish Linklater as himself (uncredited)

== Episodes ==
No. overall	No. in season	Title	Directed by	Written by	Original release date	Prod. code	US viewers (millions)
Part 1
124	1	"Multiply Thy Pain"	Jessica Yu	Halley Feiffer	September 20, 2023	CATS01	0.454
Young actress Anna Alcott nearly misses her transvaginal oocyte retrieval after learning it was suddenly rescheduled, unbeknownst to her, angering her husband Dex as the two have had difficulty attempting to conceive a child using IVF. However, while traveling to the appointment, Anna notices a mysterious woman multiple times and believes the woman is stalking her. In the operation room, Anna is kissed by Mavis Preecher, a woman she met while waiting to be called for her appointment. Anna later meets with her PR agent Siobhan Corbyn, who has booked her a spot on Watch What Happens Live with Andy Cohen, hoping for her to be an Academy Award nominee. At Dex's art gallery show, Anna speaks with Talia, Dex's colleague who mentions his previous wife, Adeline, a chef who died in a fire, and gifts Anna a lipstick. Anna later awakens to find herself covered in the lipstick and finds a message saying "Don't do it Anna" on her bathroom mirror.
125	2	"Rockabye"	Jennifer Lynch	Halley Feiffer	September 27, 2023	CATS02	0.318
Security footage shows that no one besides Dex entered or exited Anna's apartment building, leading a police detective to suggest she was hallucinating due to her pregnancy medications. Anna is anxious to take a pregnancy test, but is advised to wait two full weeks (it having only been three days). A moment later, Dex suggests she take the test, and Anna realizes that she has lost two weeks of time. She takes the test and they find that she is pregnant. Her fertility doctor advises her to avoid stress. Anna learns from Siobhan that she has been nominated for a Gotham Award. At the awards ceremony, Anna finds herself at odds with Babette Eno, another actress nominated in the same category. In the bathroom, Anna inadvertently peels her skin off, attempting to conceal her pimple, and injures a fan. Later, when giving a speech for winning the award, Anna sees the fan, Ms. Preecher and Dex kissing his colleague, Sonia, in the crowd, before Anna vomits and faints. Sometime later, Dex and Anna stay at Talia's house in the Hamptons, where Anna hears strange noises at night. The next day, Anna experiences increasingly severe pain and profuse bleeding. At the local hospital, she is administered an ultrasound by a nurse named Ivy who resembles her stalker. She later learns she miscarried, and that no nurse named Ivy works at the hospital.
126	3	"When the Bough Breaks"	Jennifer Lynch	Halley Feiffer	October 4, 2023	CATS03	0.366
Dex encourages Anna to report Ivy to the police, but she believes her story will be dismissed. Anna fears that there is a conspiracy to prevent her from conceiving, but Dex dismisses her. In the woods near Talia's home, Anna finds Ms. Preecher and alerts Dex, but they find no trace when searching for her. At the beach, Anna discovers a doll with nails in its stomach that she signed, as two veiled figures dressed in black watch her from afar. In Talia's basement, Anna discovers a box marked "Talia's Baby Stuff" before spotting a small door, which she crawls through to an underground chamber. While there, the two figures from the beach trap and chloroform her, causing Anna to fall unconscious. She later feels the baby move in her uterus, but Dr. Hill dismisses it as grief from miscarrying. At a pharmacy, Anna notices the figures stalking her, but the clerk does not. Going home, she watches Sonia and Dex speak, before being interrupted by Preecher saying "Watch out for her", who later warns her that "they did something" and confirms she did not miscarry.
127	4	"Vanishing Twin"	John J. Gray	Halley Feiffer	October 11, 2023	CATS04	0.358
In 1555, after having forged a deal with Satan to ensure prosperity, Mary I gives birth to a demonic child. In 2023, Anna places a dead raccoon in Talia's bassinet and treats it as her child. Later, Siobhan hires Mary's ladies-in-waiting, Ashley and Ashleigh, to overhaul Anna's public image. Anna films an Instagram Reel about her pregnancy for them, and it goes viral. At the clinic, she gets diagnosed with vanishing twin syndrome, to her and Dex's bewilderment. Anna also encounters Ivy again, although Dex is unable to find her. Dex's mother visits them and explains she is suing Dex's father for committing Satanic ritual abuse. Anna receives a mysterious card saying, "You can't trust any of them", and binge eats before fainting. She later discovers she has been nominated for the Golden Globe Awards, and devours the raccoon she previously kept in the bassinet. Siobhan is revealed to be in an affair with Hamish, the director of Anna's breakout film, The Auteur, and implies it was a success because he made a Satanic pact.
128	5	"Preech"	John J. Gray	Halley Feiffer	October 18, 2023	CATS05	0.239
In 1987, Dr. Hill attends while Ms. Preecher gives birth to a demonic child, due to a Satanic pact she made. Preecher attempts to break the pact, but he prevents her from doing so. In 2023, Dex's mother asks him to testify against his father, but Dex refuses. To her annoyance, Anna discovers Siobhan now also represents Babette. Dex's mother meets Preecher, who explains her history: in 1987, she became pregnant after a one-night stand and attempted to get an abortion but stopped after a woman promised to grant her deepest desires if she complied with certain demands. Preecher warns Dex's mother that she, Dex and Anna are in danger from the Satanic cult which Adeline was in before defecting when she became infatuated with Dex. Anna goes to Cora to receive pelvic floor therapy, but leaves after Cora violates her consent. Anna discovers that Dex does not believe her story about Ivy or Cora. While watching the Golden Globe Award ceremony, Anna learns she has lost to Babette and vomits up raccoon claws. Siobhan calls her, asking if she wants an Oscar Award. Anna agrees and a mysterious figure grabs her. She wakes up the next morning and discovers Babette was decapitated in a car crash.
Part 2
129	6	"Opening Night"	Bradley Buecker	Halley Feiffer	April 3, 2024	CATS06	0.243
In 1988, Anna's mother Margaret Alcott dies of a preventable pulmonary embolism. At the hospital, Nicolette walks in and holds infant Anna, revealing her immortality and participation in the coven. In 2024, Siobhan reveals that Babette's death makes Anna the front runner for the Oscar, and gives her the head speech spot at her funeral for good press. After Hamish threatens to expose Siobhan's secrets, she murders him and stages his death as a suicide. As Anna begins piecing together what is happening to her, Nicolette continues to cross boundaries, putting Anna on edge. Anna and Dex make up from their fight, and Dex talks to his father about Virginia's lawsuit. At Dex and Sonia's opening night for their art gallery, the coven unites and reveals to Anna they are working together in a twisted, hazy sequence. Anna decides she wants to leave the entertainment industry, but Siobhan convinces her to stay. At the end of the night, Dex goes to his mother's house to find out why she skipped the gallery, and finds her dead in the bathtub with her wrists slit and a lipstick drawn message saying "I tried to warn you" on the mirror.
130	7	"Ave Hestia"	Jennifer Lynch	Halley Feiffer	April 10, 2024	CATS07	0.312
In Western Europe 42 A.D., Ivy gives birth to twins Sonia and Adeline in a barn. They all die, but are brought back to life by a mysterious witch. By 2013, Adeline has left the cult due to its evil nature and Ivy's abuse. She marries Dex and opens a restaurant called Hestia. One evening, Sonia warns her she will regret abandoning the cult, marking her for an unwanted pregnancy. The cult begins stalking her, as her best friend Talia sells her company and offers to fund an art gallery for Dex after his father cuts off his finances. Dex learns that Adeline is pregnant and goes to tell his parents, but finds his father offering Virginia's blood to the cult. Dexter Sr. reveals his real mother is the witch he is caught fornicating with and has Dex's memory erased. Adeline is confronted by the cult and Talia reveals herself as a member. The members cut her open and spread her fetal blood on their skin for immortality and everlasting beauty. Planning to set Dex up with a new wife who will birth the "purest product", they light Adeline on fire and stage her death as a kitchen fire.
131	8	"Little Gold Man"	Jennifer Lynch	Halley Feiffer	April 17, 2024	CATS08	0.158
In 1967, Frank Sinatra threatens to divorce Mia Farrow if she continues to work on the film Rosemary's Baby. After hallucinating giving birth to a demon baby, Farrow is greeted by Siobhan in her dressing room. In 2024, Anna, now Oscar-nominated, and Dex attend Virginia's funeral which Ms. Preecher crashes. She declares Virginia was murdered and chides Dex for not listening to Anna before being removed by security. Anna follows Preecher to the hospital and stays with her at night but finds her gone the next morning. She later runs into Cora, who reveals that she had an affair with Dex and began gaslighting Anna after he broke things off. She also warns Anna that Dr. Hill and the cult did something to her baby. Back at home, Anna kicks Dex out of the house. At the Oscars ceremony, Siobhan asks Anna if she wants an Oscar, to which she says yes. Shortly afterward, Anna wins an Oscar and goes on stage to give a speech. However, plagued by hallucinations of her mother, she falls short of delivering it and her water breaks.
132	9	"The Auteur"	Gwyneth Horder-Payton	Halley Feiffer	April 24, 2024	CATS09	0.232
In flashbacks, Siobhan meets Anna for the first time and forces Dr. Hill to work for her. In 2024, Dex and Kamal join Anna in the ambulance, which Ivy drives to an underground facility. As Anna goes into labor, Ivy shoots Kamal, and the baby bites Dex's hand off; Ivy forces it down Dex's throat, killing him. After Anna gives birth to a demonic boy, Ivy tells her that her baby was the price for her Oscar. Later, Anna awakens paralyzed from the waist down, where she is greeted by the cult, the Delicates. Siobhan reveals herself as the leader and offers Anna beauty and power. As Dex's father enters, Siobhan explains that she is Dex's mother, and that Anna's fetus was replaced with her own. Siobhan kills Ivy for killing Dex, and explains that the cult's ultimate goal is to use Dex's preserved sperm to breed superpowered children who will kill all men. After Anna agrees to join, Adeline appears and tells Anna that only light can snuff out the dark. Anna joins Adeline in chanting, causing Siobhan to disintegrate. Anna, no longer paralyzed, puts on Siobhan's headpiece and finds her baby, now human, and her Oscar in the next room.

== Production ==
=== Development ===
On January 9, 2020, American Horror Story was renewed for up to a thirteenth season. On April 10, 2023, series co-creator Ryan Murphy confirmed that the season would have Halley Feiffer as showrunner and be based on Danielle Valentine's upcoming book Delicate Condition, making it the first season in the series' history to not have Murphy as showrunner and to lean into source material. Murphy also announced that the season would be titled Delicate.

=== Casting ===
Matt Czuchry joined the twelfth season's cast on April 6, 2023. On April 10, 2023, Murphy announced that the season would be led by Kim Kardashian and series veteran Emma Roberts. Murphy described the season as "ambitious and unlike anything [the series has] ever done" and Kardashian's character as "fun, stylish and ultimately terrifying". Kardashian's involvement in the series is her first in scripted television (besides a one-scene appearance in an episode of the 2008 reboot series of 90210) and was being planned by her and Murphy since 2022, after Murphy was impressed by her work as a host in an October 2021 episode of Saturday Night Live.

On April 24, Cara Delevingne was spotted filming scenes for the season with Roberts. The same week, Annabelle Dexter-Jones and Michaela Jaé Rodriguez joined the cast in undisclosed capacities. On May 1, Variety mentioned Odessa A'zion among the confirmed cast members. In June, People reported that Zachary Quinto confirmed he would make a cameo appearance in the season. The actor also praised Kardashian's performance, stating, "I don't think she needs my advice. She seemed really in her element, and I was really impressed by her spirit and her openness".

=== Filming ===
On May 1, during the Met Gala, Kardashian told Variety that production for the season had begun, and her scenes would be filmed later that month. On May 4, the third day of the 2023 Writers Guild of America strike in New York City, it was rumored that production had paused. However, Deadline Hollywood reported that filming for the twelfth season did not stop and cast members were using a studio back entrance to avoid the picket line. On May 10, 2023, it was announced that production for the season has stopped due to the strike. Filming was officially suspended in July due to the 2023 SAG-AFTRA strike. Filming resumed at the end of November 2023 and wrapped on January 22, 2024.

== Release ==
=== Marketing ===
On July 20, the season's first teaser trailer was released. Described as "sinister" by press, it presents white-haired women in a circle and motherhood imagery, including Kardashian holding a baby; Kardashian, Roberts and Delevingne are the only actors to appear, with all of them wearing bright red lipstick. The teaser features a modified version of the English nursery rhyme "Rock-a-bye Baby." After watching the teaser, Kyle Denis of Billboard pointed out Rosemary's Baby (1968) as a possible inspiration for the season. A full trailer was released on September 6.

=== Broadcast ===
On August 15, FX announced that American Horror Story: Delicate would be split into two parts, and that the first part would premiere on September 20, 2023. Following the release of the first episode, subsequent episodes were scheduled to air weekly on Thursdays. In Canada, the season premiered simultaneously with the United States, with episodes of Delicate airing on FX at 10 p.m. ET / 7 p.m. PT beginning September 20. In the United States, the second part of four episodes premiered on April 3, 2024.

=== Streaming ===
New episodes of American Horror Story: Delicate were made available for streaming on Hulu at 3:00 a.m. ET on Thursdays. Internationally, the series was made available to stream on Disney+.

American Horror Story debuted at No. 1 on Hulu's "Top 15 Today"—a daily updated list of the platform's most-watched titles—on its first full day of release. JustWatch, a guide to streaming content with access to data from more than 20 million users around the world, reported that it was the seventh most-streamed television series in the U.S. during the week of September 18–24, 2023. It subsequently moved to ninth place for the period from September 25 to October 15, 2023. The streaming aggregator Reelgood, which tracks real-time data from 5 million U.S. users for original and acquired content across SVOD and AVOD services, announced that it was the ninth most-streamed program in the U.S. during the week of October 12, 2023. Market research company Parrot Analytics, which looks at consumer engagement in consumer research, streaming, downloads, and on social media, announced that American Horror Story was the most in-demand horror series of 2023. American Horror Story subsequently became one of the most in-demand horror series of 2024, alongside titles such as Kaiju No. 8, The Walking Dead: Daryl Dixon, and The Walking Dead: The Ones Who Live, according to Parrot Analytics.

Nielsen Media Research, which records streaming viewership on certain U.S. television screens, reported that American Horror Story: Delicate garnered 703 million minutes of watch time, averaging 78.1 million minutes viewed per episode, between May 1, 2024, and August 31, 2026.

== Reception ==
=== Critical response ===
On the review aggregator website Rotten Tomatoes, 77% critics' reviews are positive, with an average rating of 4.6/10, based on 13 reviews. The website's consensus reads: "American Horror Story reins in its Grand Guignol excess for a softer touch in Delicate, refreshing the series' formula with a slow-burn chiller about the anxieties of pregnancy." Metacritic, which uses a weighted average, assigned a score of 57 out of 100 based on 8 critics, indicating "mixed or average" reviews.

JP Mangalindan of People reported that multiple critics praised the performance of Kim Kardashian upon the season premiere. Anthony D'Alessandro of Deadline Hollywood called her "perfect" for the role of Siobhan Corbyn. Patrick Ryan of USA Today stated that Kardashian succeeded to embody the valley girl persona in a clever way. Coleman Spilde of The Daily Beast found Kardashian to be the best element of the season, while also complimenting the performance of Emma Roberts. Benjamin Lee of The Guardian gave Delicate a grade of three out of five stars, said that Kardashian provides a new and better screen presence compared to other media she starred in, and found Delicate to be more accessible than the previous seasons owing to its focus on the thriller genre.

=== Ratings ===
On October 4, 2023, American Horror Story had the highest reported total audience with 366,000 viewers (P2+) and a 0.12% rating. Among adults aged 18–49, the peak was 129,200 viewers (0.10 rating) on the same date. The most recent episode, aired on April 24, 2024, drew 232,000 total viewers (0.07 rating), including 105,500 viewers aged 18–49 (0.08 rating) and 187,500 household viewers (0.15 rating). Across this period, total viewership (P2+) ranged from 158,000 to 366,000, while ratings among adults 18–49 varied between 0.03% and 0.10%.

=== Accolades ===
The series was one of 200 television series that received the ReFrame Stamp for the years 2023 to 2024. The stamp is awarded by the gender equity coalition ReFrame and industry database IMDbPro for film and television projects that are proven to have gender-balanced hiring, with stamps being awarded to projects that hire female-identifying people, especially women of color, in four out of eight key roles for their production.

Year	Award	Category	Nominee(s)	Result	Ref.
2024	Make-Up Artists and Hair Stylists Guild Awards	Commercials & Music Videos – Best Makeup	American Horror Story: Delicate	Won	
2024	Make-Up Artists and Hair Stylists Guild Awards	Commercials & Music Videos – Best Hair Styling	American Horror Story: Delicate	Won	
2024	People's Choice Awards	Sci-Fi/Fantasy Show of the Year	American Horror Story: Delicate	Nominated	
2024	Saturn Awards	Best Horror Television Series	American Horror Story: Delicate	Nominated	
2024	Costume Designers Guild Awards	Excellence in Short Form Design	American Horror Story: Delicate	Nominated	
2024	NAACP Image Awards	Outstanding Supporting Actress in a Television Movie, Limited Series or Dramatic Special	Michaela Jaé Rodriguez	Nominated	
2024	Golden Reel Awards	Outstanding Achievement in Sound Editing - Broadcast Short Form	American Horror Story: Delicate	Nominated	
2024	Primetime Creative Arts Emmy Awards	Outstanding Contemporary Costumes	Jacqueline Demeterio, Jessica Zavala, Jennifer Salim, Jose Bantula and Jillian Daidone (for "The Auteur")	Won	
