= American Gigolo (TV series) =

American neo-noir crime drama television series

- Genre: Crime drama; Neo-noir; Romantic drama
- Based on: American Gigolo by Paul Schrader
- Developed by: David Hollander
- Starring: Jon Bernthal; Gretchen Mol; Lizzie Brocheré; Gabriel LaBelle; Leland Orser; Rosie O'Donnell
- Theme music composer: Giorgio Moroder; Deborah Harry
- Opening theme: "Call Me" by Blondie
- Composer: Marcelo Zarvos
- Country of origin: United States
- Original language: English
- No. of seasons: 1
- No. of episodes: 8

Production
- Executive producers: Pavlina Hatoupis; KristieAnne Reed; Russell Rothberg; Nikki Toscano; David Hollander; Jonathan Littman; Jerry Bruckheimer
- Producer: Matthew Barber
- Running time: 44–60 minutes
- Production companies: Three Rivers Entertainment; Jerry Bruckheimer Television; Paramount Television Studios

Original release
- Network: Showtime
- Release: September 11 – October 30, 2022

American Gigolo is an American neo-noir crime drama television series developed by David Hollander. It is based on the 1980 film of the same name written and directed by Paul Schrader. The series stars Jon Bernthal as Julian Kaye, the protagonist of the original film, alongside Gretchen Mol, Lizzie Brocheré, Gabriel LaBelle, Leland Orser, and Rosie O'Donnell.

American Gigolo premiered on Showtime on September 11, 2022. In January 2023, the series was canceled after one season.

== Premise ==
Julian Kaye, a 38-year-old former male escort, is exonerated 15 years after being framed and arrested for murder. Struggling to find his footing in the modern-day Los Angeles sex industry, he seeks the truth about the frame that sent him to prison in 2007 and hopes to reconnect with his one true love, Michelle.

== Cast and characters ==
=== Main ===
- Jon Bernthal as Julian "Johnny" Kaye
  - Gabriel LaBelle as young Julian "Johnny" Kaye / Colin Stratton
- Gretchen Mol as Michelle Stratton
- Lizzie Brocheré as Isabelle
  - Harlow Happy Hexum as young Isabelle
- Leland Orser as Richard Stratton
- Rosie O'Donnell as Det. Joan Sunday

=== Recurring ===
- Wayne Brady as Lorenzo
  - Kondwani Phiri as young Lorenzo
- Alex Fernandez as Panish
- Laura Liguori as Elizabeth Shannonhouse
- Sandrine Holt as Olga Desnain
- François Chau as Don Clyborne
- Yolonda Ross as Lizzy
- Jay Washington as Luther
- Patrick Fischler as Theodore Banks
- Heather McComb as Rachel
- Melora Walters as Maryanne Henderson
- Taylor Blackwell as Lisa Beck

=== Guest ===
- Jay Alan Christianson as Kevin Finnegan
- Juliana Joel as Zoe
- M. Emmet Walsh as Coleman. This was Walsh’s final television appearance.
- Heather Mazur as Anne
- Lothaire Bluteau as Guy

== Episodes ==
No.	Title	Directed by	Written by	Original release date	U.S. viewers (millions)
1	"Pilot"	David Hollander	David Hollander	September 11, 2022	0.133
2	"Pretty Baby"	David Hollander	David Hollander	September 18, 2022	0.159
3	"Rapture"	Tucker Gates	David Hollander & Cami Delavigne	September 25, 2022	0.208
4	"Nothing is Real But the Girl"	Gregg Araki	Emily Kaczmarek	October 2, 2022	0.124
5	"The Escape Wheel"	Damian Marcano	David Bar Katz	October 9, 2022	N/A
6	"Sunday Girl"	Natasha Braier	Walter Blount	October 16, 2022	N/A
7	"Atomic"	Cheryl Dunye	Walter Blount & Alye Miller	October 23, 2022	N/A
8	"East of Eden"	Damian Marcano	Nikki Toscano, Russell Rothberg, Dan Dworkin, Jay Beattie, & Alye Miller	October 30, 2022	N/A

== Production ==
=== Development ===
A television adaptation of the 1980 film American Gigolo, written and directed by Paul Schrader and starring Richard Gere, was announced as being in development on October 29, 2014. Jerry Bruckheimer, a producer on the original film, was set to executive produce the potential series, with Paramount Television Studios serving as the production company. On November 2, 2016, it was announced that Showtime had set up the project for development, with Neil LaBute attached as writer. The project was subsequently ordered to pilot on March 11, 2020, after going through multiple different incarnations, with Ray Donovan's David Hollander set to produce the series as well as write and direct the pilot.

On June 15, 2021, it was announced that Showtime had given the project a 10-episode series order, with Hollander set as showrunner. On April 23, 2022, it was announced that Hollander had left the project after an on-set misconduct investigation. The series premiered on September 11, 2022. On January 30, 2023, Showtime canceled the series after one season.

=== Casting ===
After a casting search took place in early 2020, Jon Bernthal was cast as the lead alongside the pilot order announcement in March 2020. In November 2020, Gretchen Mol was cast in a lead role, with Rosie O'Donnell added in a starring role the following month. Lizzie Brocheré, Gabriel LaBelle, and Leland Orser joined the main cast in January 2021, with Wayne Brady set to star in a recurring capacity that same month.

=== Filming ===
Principal photography began on July 12, 2021, in Los Angeles. On April 27, 2022, it was reported that production was shut down for four days due to Hollander's dismissal and an actor being unavailable at the moment. On May 12, 2022, it was announced that production was shut down again for at least two weeks as David Bar Katz exited the series.

== Reception ==
The review aggregator website Rotten Tomatoes reported a 35% approval rating with an average rating of 5.2/10, based on 37 critic reviews. The website's critics consensus reads, "Wasting Jon Bernthal's considerable charms on a tedious murder mystery, this American Gigolo is more dud than stud." Metacritic, which uses a weighted average, assigned a score of 50 out of 100 based on 19 critics, indicating "mixed or average reviews".
