= Jean-Marc Barr =

French-American actor and director

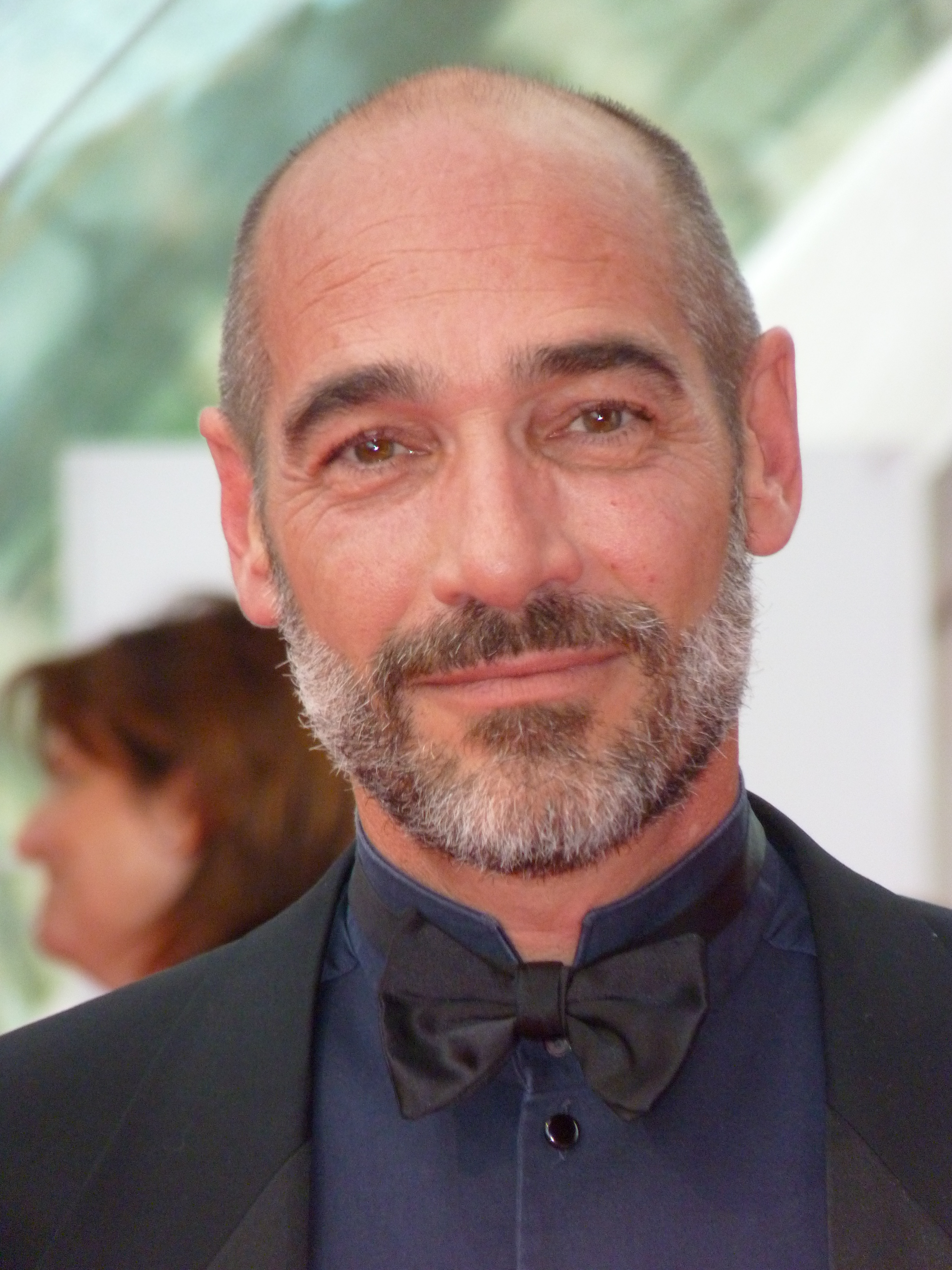
- Barr in 2012
- Born: September 27, 1960 (age 66); Bitburg, West Germany
- Education: Guildhall School of Music and Drama
- Occupations: Film, stage, television actor, director, screenwriter, film producer
- Years active: 1985 - present
- Spouse: Irina Dečermić (divorced)

Jean-Marc Barr (born September 27, 1960) is a French-American film actor and director. He is best known for working on several films from Danish film director and frequent collaborator Lars von Trier since Europa (1991).

== Early life and education ==
Barr was born to a French mother and an American father working in the United States Armed Forces. He is fluent in both French and English. Barr was born in West Germany where his father was stationed, and lived an itinerant childhood. His family moved to France in 1968, then to California in 1974.

Barr's parents wished for him to join the armed forces, but he was unwilling to follow in his father's footsteps. He studied philosophy at the University of California, Los Angeles, then at the Paris Conservatoire and the Sorbonne. He moved to London to pursue an education in drama at the Guildhall School of Music and Drama.

== Career ==
Barr began working in theatre in France in 1986. After finding work in television (including a small role in Hotel du Lac (1986), the BBC's version of the Booker prize-winning novel by Anita Brookner), and film (in particular Hope and Glory (1987) by John Boorman), he was cast in the tremendously successful The Big Blue (1988). Luc Besson cast him in the role of French diver Jacques Mayol, alongside Rosanna Arquette and Jean Reno. The Big Blue was the most financially successful film in France in the 1980s.

In 1991, Barr starred in Danish director Lars von Trier's Europa, marking the beginning of a long friendship (he is the godfather of von Trier's children) as well as a significant professional relationship. He went on to appear in von Trier's Breaking the Waves (1996), Dancer in the Dark (2000), Dogville (2004), Manderlay (2005), The Boss of It All (2006) and Nymph()maniac (2013). In 2005 he starred in the French film Crustacés et Coquillages. In 1999 he starred in the French cinéma du corps/cinema of the body drama film, Don't Let Me Die on a Sunday (French: J'aimerais pas crever un dimanche), directed by Didier Le Pêcheur.

Barr's collaboration with von Trier put him on track to start directing his own work. He debuted in 1999 as a director, screenwriter and producer with the intimate love story Lovers. The film became the first part of a trilogy; the films that followed were the drama Too Much Flesh (2000) and the comedy Being Light (2001), which he co-directed with Pascal Arnold. Barr and Pascal also directed the 2006 film Chacun sa nuit (eng: One to another), where they first discovered Lizzie Brocher, Arthur Dupont and Karl E. Landler. This was followed by another collaboration in 2012, Sexual Chronicles of a French Family.

In 1997, Barr appeared in The Scarlet Tunic, produced by Zigi Kamasa. He appeared as Hugo in The Red Siren in 2002 and played divorce lawyer Maître Bertram in the 2003 Merchant Ivory film le Divorce. He appeared as the titular character in the video for Blur's 1996 single, "Charmless Man".

In 2010, he starred in Kim Nguyen's film City of Shadows (La Cité). Barr played author Jack Kerouac in the 2013 film adaptation of the Beat Generation autobiographical novel Big Sur.

== Filmography ==
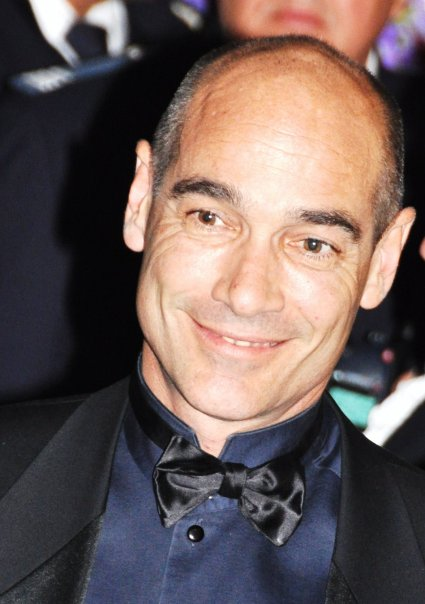
Barr at the 2002 Cannes Film Festival.

=== Film ===
Year	Title	Role	Notes
1985	King David	Absalom	
1986	The Frog Prince	James	
1987	Hope and Glory	Bruce	
1987	Maurice	French Colleague	Uncredited
1988	The Big Blue	Jacques Mayol	
1991	Le brasier	Victor	
1991	Europa	Leopold Kessler	
1992	The Plague	Jean Tarrou	
1994	Iron Horsemen	Robert	
1994	Les faussaires	Baker	
1994	The Favourite Son	Philippe	
1996	L'échappée belle	Emmanuel Barnes	
1996	Marching in Darkness	Silvio Roatta	
1996	Breaking the Waves	Terry	
1996	Mo'	Sam Follow	
1998	The Scarlet Tunic	Matthaus Singer	
1998	Préférence	Simon	
1998	Folle d'elle	Marc	
1998	Ça ne se refuse pas	Alex	
1998	Don't Let Me Die on a Sunday	Ben	
1998	St. Ives	Jacques de Keroual de Saint-Yves	
2000	Dancer in the Dark	Norman	
2000	Too Much Flesh	Lyle	
2001	Being Light	Jack Lesterhoof	
2002	Marie's Sons	Paul	
2002	The Red Siren	Hugo Cornelius Toorop	
2003	Dogville	The Man with the Big Hat	
2003	Saltimbank	Frédéric Saltim	
2003	The Divorce	Maitre Bertram	
2003	The Car Keys	Un comédien	
2004	CQ2 (Seek You Too)	Steven	
2005	Crustacés & Coquillages	Didier	
2005	Manderlay	Mr. Robinsson	
2005	Tara Road	Andy Vine	
2006	One to Another	Phillipe	
2006	The Boss of It All	Spencer	
2008	Baby Blues	Dan	
2008	The Anarchist's Wife	Pierre	
2008	Parc	Paul Marteau	
2008	Nucingen House	William Henry James III	
2009	Making Plans for Lena	Nigel	
2010	The City of Shadows	Maxime Vincent	
2011	His Mother's Eyes	Jean-Paul Tremazan	
2011	American Translation	William	
2011	Practical Guide to Belgrade with Singing and Crying	Brian	
2012	Niccolò Machiavelli il Principe della politica	Niccolò Machiavelli	
2012	They Call It Summer	Dino	
2013	Big Sur	Jack Kerouac	
2013	Manhattan Romance	Alex	
2013	Vandal	Paul, l'oncle	
2013	Nymphomaniac	Debtor Gentleman	
2014	The Last Mirage	Justin Livingstone	
2015	WAX: We Are the X	Jean-Christophe Touchalier	
2017	uk18	The Foreigner	
2017	After the War	Jérome	
2017	Grain	Erol	
2017	Cut Off	Trevor De Blanc	
2018	The Cellar	Milan	
2018	The House that Jack Built	Leopold Kessler	Archive footage only; uncredited
2020	My Best Part	Le réalisateur	
2021	Aleksandar od Jugoslavije	Ferdinand Foch	
2021	Silent Land	Arnaud	
2023	The Pod Generation	The Founder	

=== Theatre ===
Year	Title	Role	Theatre
1988-89	Orpheus Descending	Valentine Xavier	Theatre Royal Haymarket, London

=== Television ===
Year	Title	Role	Notes
1985	Going for the Gold: The Bill Johnson Story	Scott	Television film
1986	Screen Two	Alain	Episode: "Hotel du Lac"
1996	Reckoning	Patrick LeMay	Television film
1997	Les Infidèles	Farid	Television film
1997	Balkan Island: The Last Story of the Century	Addy	Television film
2005	Venus and Apollo	Vincent	Episode: "Soin pare chocs"
2007	Martin Paris	Martin Paris	Television film
2011	XIII: The Series	Prêtre	2 episodes
2011	The Wyvern's Lair	Paul Pratt	4 episodes
2011–2016	Blood on the Docks	Capitaine Richard Faraday	12 episodes
2018	The Miracle	Serge	Episode: "La Conservazione della Materia"
2018–2020	Bad Banks	Robert Khano	12 episodes
2020	Little Birds	Secretary Pierre Vaney	6 episodes
2021	Kralj	Ferdinand Foch	3 episodes
2021	The Rope	Serge Morel	3 episodes
2022	Je te promets	Jean-Marc Barr	Episode: "L'Idole de la Famille"
2023	Rivages		6 episodes
2024	Anthracite	Solal Heilman	Limited series
