= Don't Let Me Die on a Sunday =

- Directed by: Didier Le Pêcheur
- Written by: Didier Le Pêcheur
- Produced by: Fabrice Coat
- Starring: Élodie Bouchez; Jean-Marc Barr
- Cinematography: Denis Rouden
- Edited by: Sylvie Landra
- Music by: Philippe Cohen-Solal
- Production company: Program 33
- Distributed by: PolyGram Film Distribution
- Release date: 6 January 1999 (France)
- Running time: 90 minutes
- Country: France
- Language: French

Don't Let Me Die on a Sunday (French: J'aimerais pas crever un dimanche) is a 1999 French cinéma du corps/cinema of the body drama film, directed by Didier Le Pêcheur.

== Cast ==
- Élodie Bouchez as Térésa
- Jean-Marc Barr as Ben
- Martin Petit-Guyot as Ducon
- Patrick Catalifo as Boris
- Gérard Loussine as Abel
- Jean-Michel Fête as Nico
- Zazie as Jeanne
- Jeanne Casilas as Marie
- Florence Darel as Line

== Reception ==
The film gained negative reviews. Metacritic.com gave the film 34 out of 100 based on nine critics.

Allmovie.com gave a 2 and a half out of five.
