= Danielle Rollins =

American novelist

Danielle Vega, also known under the pen names of Danielle Rollins, Ellie Rollins, and Danielle Valentine, is an American author.

In May 2014, it was announced that film rights to Vega's book The Merciless had been purchased by Lionsgate Films and that Pretty Little Liars producer I. Marlene King would serve as scriptwriter and producer.

In April 2023, it was announced that the twelfth season of American Horror Story, subtitled Delicate, would be based on her book Delicate Condition.

== Bibliography ==
=== As Danielle Rollins ===
- Burning (2016)
- Breaking (2017)

Dark Stars trilogy

- Stolen Time (2019)
- Twisted Fates (2020)
- Dark Stars (2021)

=== As Ellie Rollins ===
- Zip (2012)
- Snap (2013)

=== As Danielle Vega ===
The Merciless series

- The Merciless (2014)
- The Merciless II: The Exorcism of Sofia Flores (2016)
- The Merciless III: Origins of Evil (2017)
- The Merciless IV: Last Rites (2018)

The Haunted series

- The Haunted (2019)
- The Unleashed (2020)

Standalone

- Survive the Night (2015)

=== As Danielle Valentine ===
- How to Survive Your Murder (2022)
- Delicate Condition (2023)
- Two Sides to Every Murder (2024)
- The Dead Husband Cookbook (2025)
