= Patti Negri =

American author, public speaker and TV personality

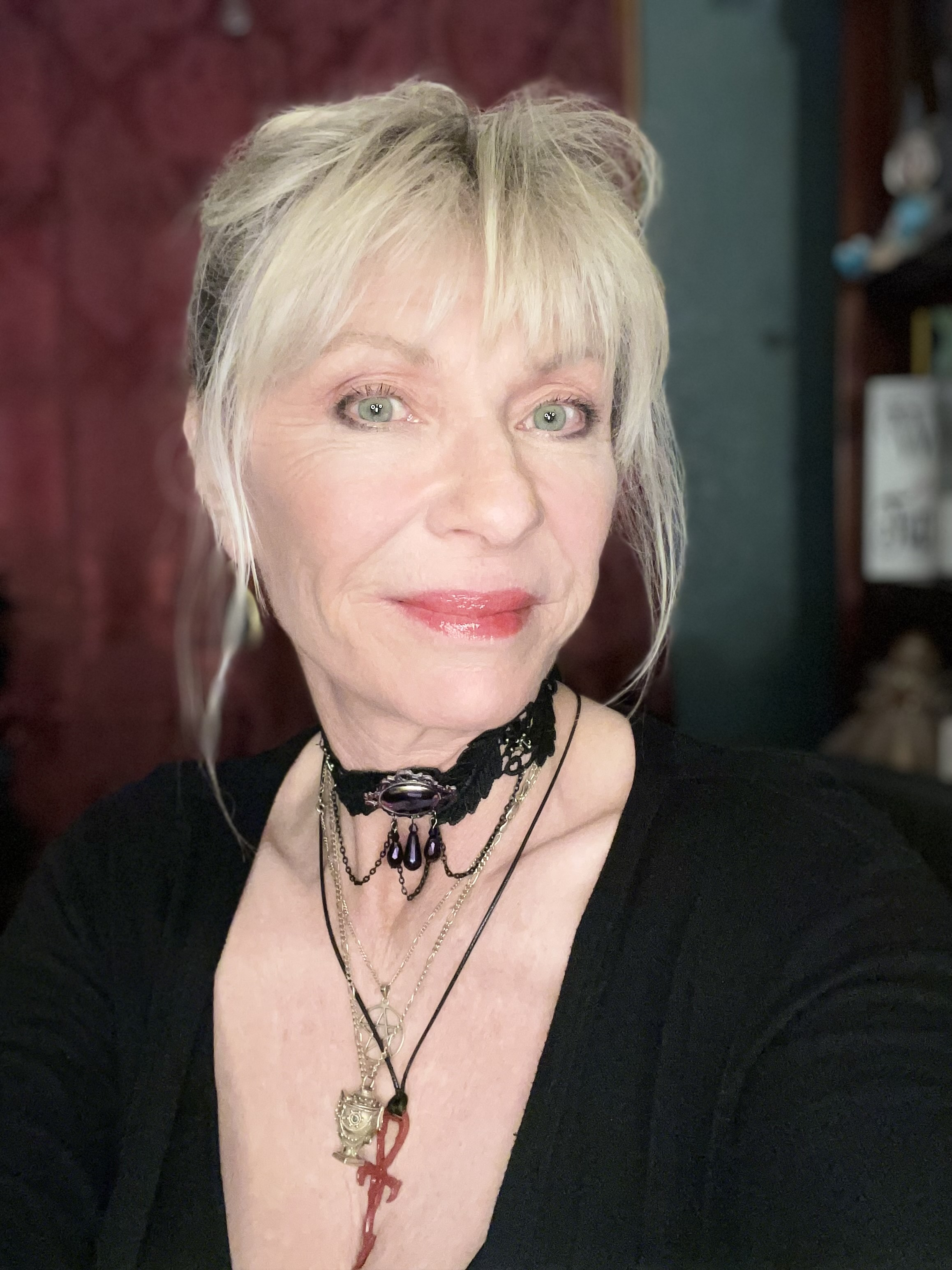
- Born: Long Beach, California
- Occupations: Author, public speaker and tv personality
- Website: www.pattinegri.com

Patti Negri is an American author, public speaker and television personality.

== Career ==
Negri is known for her recurring role on Travel Channel & Discovery's no. 1 show Ghost Adventures and YouTube's no.1 paranormal show, Overnight with Elton Castee. She has featured on notable shows including Portals to Hell, MasterChef, Wipeout, America's Got Talent and others.

Negri is the Vice President of Paraflixx.com, and a partner and educator at University Magickus.com. She is the author of Old World Magick for the Modern World. She has contributed to over twenty books, featured on interviews and conducted seances on radios, films, and TVs.

Negri anchors her first podcast,The Witching Hour. In 2024, She launched her second weekly podcast, The Witch's Movie Coven.

== Books ==
- Old World Magick for the Modern World: Tips, Tricks, and Techniques to Balance, Empower, and Create a Life You Love. 2019. ISBN 9781733545501.
- Women Gone Wild - Intuition Edition. 2021. ISBN 9781612546384.
- Dollcraft: A Witch's Guide to Poppet Magick & Haunted Dolls. 2025. ISBN 073877748X.

== See also ==
- American Horror Story
