= Lizzie Brocheré =

French actress (born 1985)

- Born: Lizzie Amélie Brocheré; 22 March 1985 (age 40); Paris, France
- Occupation: Actress
- Years active: 1995–present
- Spouse: John Robinson

Lizzie Brocheré (French: [bʁɔʃ.ʁe], born 22 March 1985) is a French actress, writer and producer. Her English language credits include American Horror Story: Asylum (2012–2013), The Strain (2015), Versailles (2015–2017), Falling Water (2016–2018), War of the Worlds (2022), and American Gigolo (2022).

== Life and career ==
Brocheré made her screen debut in 2002 at the age of 17, as Jeanne in the Hugo Santiago film Le Loup de la côte Ouest (The Wolf of the West Coast) (2002).

Her big break came when she landed the lead role in the sensual Dogme 95 film One to Another, directed by Jean-Marc Barr and Pascal Arnold with whom she collaborated again a few years later on with the thriller American Translation.

Her other film credits include Eric Schaeffer's After Fall, Winter; and Karin Albou's The Wedding Song, for which she won the Best Actress Award at the Saint-Jean-de-Luz Film Festival.

She is known to US audiences for playing the supporting role of Coco in Guillermo del Toro's The Strain (2015), as one of the three principle leads in Henry Bromell and Blake Masters's sci-fi series Falling Water (2016–2018). and the role of Grace in FX's American Horror Story: Asylum. Her international TV credits include the French TV series Versailles and BBC's The Hour.

== Filmography ==
=== Film ===
Year	Title	Role	Notes
2002	Le Loup de la côte ouest	Jeanne	
2004	Un petit jeu sans conséquence	Gladys	
2006	Chacun sa nuit	Lucie	
2006	Papier glacé		Short film
2007	Septembre et moi	Septembre	Short film
2008	Le Chant des mariées	Myriam	
2008	A French Film	Young Parisian Woman	
2009	Tellement proches	Clara	
2009	Linear	Waitress	
2009	Do Me Love	Juliette	
2009	The Vintner's Luck	Sabine	
2010	Depuis demain	Camille	Short film
2011	Ni une, ni deux	Assistante sociale	Short film
2011	American Translation	Aurore	
2011	Nuit Blanche	Vignali	
2011	After Fall, Winter	Sophie	
2012	Imparfait du subjectif		Short film
2013	La marque des anges - Miserere	Dounia	
2014	Award Winning Indie Lesbian Sex Film		Short film
2015	The Magic Mountain	Anna Winkler	Voice
2015	Full Contact	Cindy	
2017	Rings	Kelly	
2017	The Dream of the Guest	Blue	Post-production
2018	Vaurien	Anna	

=== Television ===
Year	Title	Role	Notes
1995	Parents à mi-temps		
1999	Trois en un – Mission: Protection Rapprochée		
2001	Margaux Valence: Le silence d'Alice	Alice	Television film
2001	Relic Hunter	Princess Natasha	Episode: "Don't Go into the Woods"
2001	Joséphine, ange gardien	Katia	Episode: "La Tête dans les étoiles"
2002	Une autre femme	Emma	Television film
2002–2007	Alex Santana, négociateur – Un ange noir	Eva	7 episodes
2002	Qui a tué Lili?		
2002	Les enquêtes d'Éloïse Rome	Lili	Episode: "Qui a tué Lili?"
2003	Sissi, l'impératrice rebelle	Sissi Jeune	Television film
2004	Le Miroir de l'eau	Anaïs	4 episodes
2005	Un lendemain matin – Avec le temps		
2005	Dolmen	Aude Perec	Episode: "Episode #1.1"
2005	Sauveur Giordano	Audrey Nancel	Episode: "L'envers du décor"
2005	Maigret	Geneviève Blanchon	Episode: "Maigret et l'étoile du nord"
2006–2011	R.I.S. Police scientifique – Une vie brisée	Cécile Chalonges	14 episodes
2006	Femmes de loi	Pauline Delcourt	Episode: "Cantine mortelle"
2006	Aves le temps...	Julie Fransen	Television film
2007	Bac +70	Alice	Television film
2008	Camping paradis	Babette	Episode: "Lorsque l'enfant paraît"
2008	Groupe flag	Jeanne	Episode: "Haute protection"
2009	SoeurThérèse.com	Inès Marin	Episode: "Crime d'amour"
2009	Les Bleus: premiers pas dans la police	Elina Volkova	6 episodes
2010	Le roi, l'écureuil et la couleuvre	Louise de La Vallière	2 episodes
2010	La maison des Rocheville	Constance	Episode: "La maison en héritage"
2011	L'été des Lip	Patricia Mélinès	Television film
2011	I Love Perigord	Ludivine	Television film
2011	Ni vu, ni connu	Éléonore	Television film
2012	Un petit bout de France	Clara	Television film
2012–2013	American Horror Story: Asylum	Grace Bertrand	Main cast; 11 episodes
2012	The Hour	Camille Mettier	4 episodes
2014	Braquo	Séverine	Television film
2014	Two Little Girls in Blue	Oriane	8 episodes
2015	The Strain	Coco Marchand	9 episodes
2015–2017	Versailles	Claudine Masson	10 episodes
2016–2018	Falling Water	Tess	Main role
2022	War of the Worlds	Juliet	8 episodes
2022	American Gigolo	Isabelle	Main role

=== Music videos ===
Year	Title	Performer(s)
2010	"Flowers: The Micronauts remix"	Magic Pop Hotel
