= Sellevision =

2000 novel by Augusten Burroughs

- Author: Augusten Burroughs
- Language: English
- Genre: Novel
- Published: 2000 St. Martin's Press
- Publication place: United States
- Media type: Print (Paperback)
- Pages: 241 pp
- ISBN: 0-312-26772-X
- OCLC: 44090536
- Dewey Decimal: 813/.6 21
- LC Class: PS3552.U745 S45 2000
- Followed by: Running with Scissors (2002)

Sellevision (2000), a novel, is the first published work by Augusten Burroughs, author of the best-selling books Running with Scissors, Dry, and Magical Thinking. Unlike Burroughs’ subsequent memoirs, Sellevision is a work of fiction.

Sellevision is a comedy that contains themes of greed and obsession. It is about four people, Max Andrews, Peggy Jean Smythe, Leigh, and Bebe, and their lives, all linked together with Sellevision, a television company.

Burroughs wrote the novel when he was getting sober. “I woke up one morning hung over, and I sat down and I wrote something,” Burroughs said in an interview. “It was two pages and it made me laugh, and I hadn’t laughed for years at that point, and that turned out to be the first couple pages of my first book, which was Sellevision. It’s a novel about the home shopping world, that whole world—and, I didn’t know what I had written. But it amused me, so I kept on writing, and I wrote until very late that night. And I drank a little bit less. And the same thing the next day. Again, I had no idea what I was doing or where it was coming from, but by the seventh day, I was not drinking at all.“

== Characters ==
Max Andrews
The male protagonist. He is fired from Sellevision after accidentally showing his genitals on live TV.
Peggy Jean Smythe
Considered the “top host” at Sellevision, she turns to Valium and alcohol after receiving strange emails from a stalker.
Bebe Friedman
An older, single woman with a shopping addiction who finds her soulmate through the internet, only to find out that they might be “closer” than they thought.
Leigh Bushmoore
One of the younger hosts on Sellevision, she is entangled in an affair with her married boss.

== Adaptations ==
The film rights to Sellevision were optioned by former Home Shopping Network CEO Mark Bozek. Some actresses mentioned as signing on with the project included Carrie Fisher, Julia Louis-Dreyfus, and Kristin Davis.

It was announced on September 10, 2009 that Bryan Fuller and Bryan Singer were pitching Sellevision to NBC as a TV series. Fuller was writing the project, and Singer was on board to direct. In the TV adaptation, “we will keep true to the tone of the book, and most of the characters will be the same,” Fuller said.
