= List of awards and nominations received by Ryan Murphy =

Ryan Murphy awards and nominations
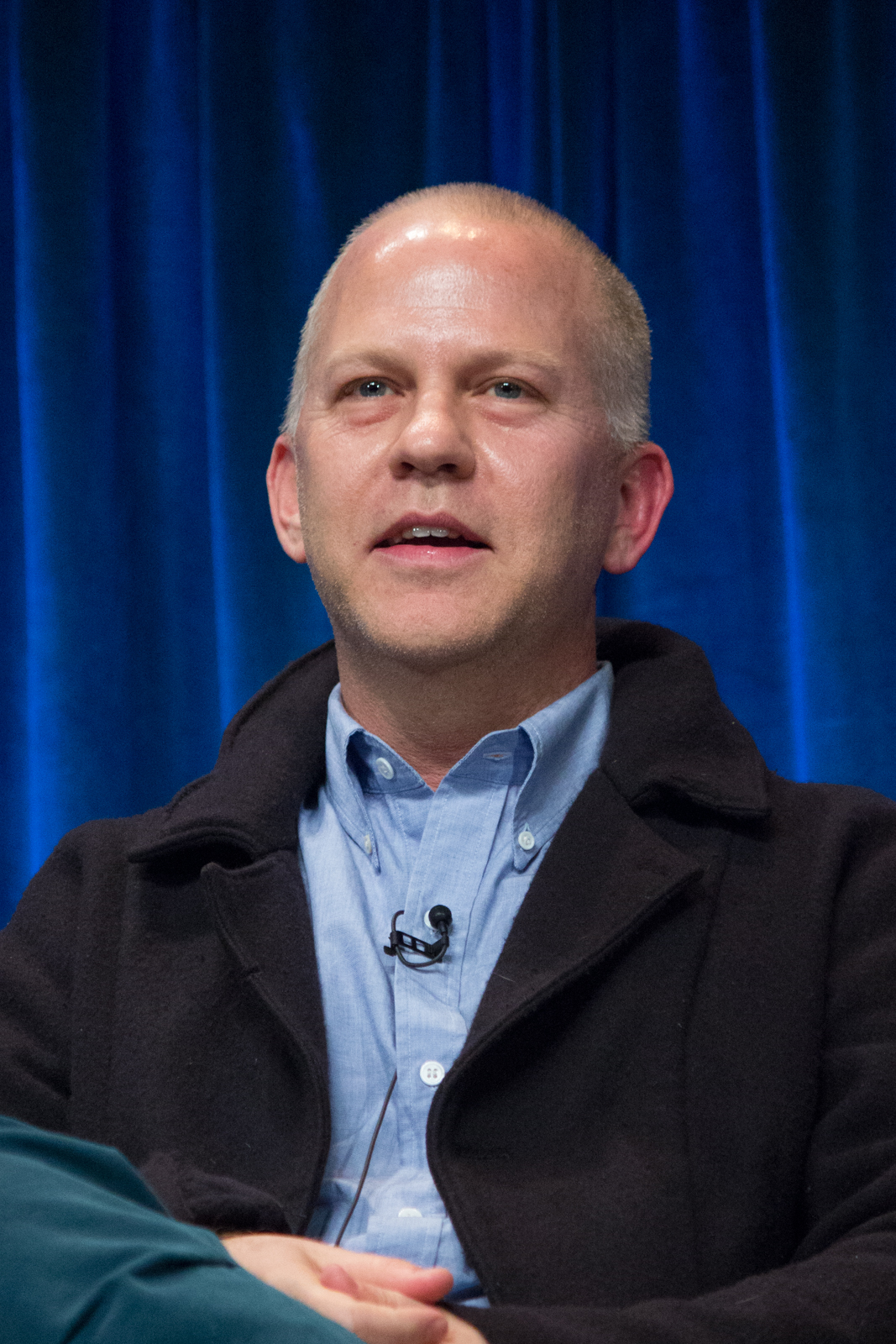
- Murphy in 2013
Awards and nominations
Award	Wins	Nominations
British Academy Film Awards	2	4
Directors Guild of America Awards	0	4
Golden Globe Awards	2	6
Grammy Awards	0	2
International Emmy Awards	1	1
Primetime Emmy Awards	6	41
Producers Guild of America Awards	4	14
Tony Awards	1	2
Writers Guild of America Awards	0	10

Totals (Note: Certain award groups do not simply award one winner. They acknowledge several different recipients, have runners-up, and have third place. Since this is a specific recognition and is different from losing an award, runner-up mentions are considered wins in this award tally. For simplification and to avoid errors, each award in this list has been presumed to have had a prior nomination.)
- Wins: 30
- Nominations: 111

Ryan Murphy is an American writer, director and producer, mainly working in television. He has been the recipient of numerous accolades including six Primetime Emmy Awards (out of 39 nominations), two British Academy Film Awards (out of four nominations), a Tony Award (out of two nominations), four Producers Guild of America Awards (out of 14 nominations) and two Golden Globe Awards (out of six nominations), along with nominations for two Grammy Awards, four Directors Guild of America Awards and ten Writers Guild of America Awards.

Murphy started his career with the teen television series Popular (1999–2001). Then he created the drama series Nip/Tuck (2003–2010), for which he received his first nominations for the Primetime Emmy Award and the Producers Guild of America Awards. He wrote and directed the film Running with Scissors (2006), for which he won the Hollywood Film Award for Hollywood Breakthrough Director. He received the critical acclaim for the musical comedy-drama series Glee (2009–2015), for which he won the Primetime Emmy Award for Outstanding Directing for a Comedy Series. In 2011, he created the anthology horror series American Horror Story. In 2014, he directed the television film The Normal Heart, for which he won the Primetime Emmy Award for Outstanding Television Movie. In 2016, he created the critically acclaimed anthology crime drama series American Crime Story. For its first season, The People v. O. J. Simpson: American Crime Story (2016), he won the Primetime Emmy Award for Outstanding Limited or Anthology Series, the Golden Globe Award for Best Limited or Anthology Series or Television Film, the British Academy Television Award for Best International Programme and the Producers Guild of America Award for Best Long-Form Television. For its second season, The Assassination of Gianni Versace: American Crime Story (2018), he won the Primetime Emmy Award for Outstanding Limited or Anthology Series and the Producers Guild of America Award for Best Limited Series Television. In the following years, he received the critical acclaim for the anthology television series Feud (2017–2024), the drama television series Pose (2018–2021) and the anthology crime drama series Monster (2022–present). Apart from the film and television, he produced the Broadway revivals of Long Day's Journey into Night (2016) and The Boys in the Band (2018), for which he was nominated for the Tony Award for Best Revival of a Play, winning for the latter one.

He has received multiple numerous honorary accolades including the International Emmy Founders Award (2012), the Norman Lear Achievement Award in Television (2018), the VH1 Trailblazer Honors (2018), the GLAAD Vito Russo Award (2020) and the Golden Globe Carol Burnett Award (2023). In 2025, he was inducted to the Television Academy Hall of Fame.

Key
†	Indicates non-competitive categories

== Major associations ==
=== BAFTA Awards ===
Year	Category	Work	Result	Ref.
British Academy Television Awards
2011	Best International Programme	Glee	Nominated	
2017	Best International Programme	The People v. O. J. Simpson: American Crime Story	Won	
2018	Best International Programme	Feud: Bette and Joan	Nominated	
2023	Best International Programme	Monster: The Jeffrey Dahmer Story	Won	

=== Emmy Awards ===
Year	Category	Work	Episode	Result	Ref.
Primetime Emmy Awards
2004	Outstanding Directing for a Drama Series	Nip/Tuck	"Pilot"	Nominated	
2010	Outstanding Comedy Series	Glee	—N/a	Nominated	
2010	Outstanding Directing for a Comedy Series	Glee	"Pilot"	Won	
2010	Outstanding Writing for a Comedy Series	Glee	"Pilot"	Nominated	
2011	Outstanding Comedy Series	Glee	—N/a	Nominated	
2012	Outstanding Miniseries or Movie	American Horror Story: Murder House	—N/a	Nominated	
2012	Outstanding Main Title Design	American Horror Story: Murder House	—N/a	Nominated	
2013	Outstanding Miniseries or Movie	American Horror Story: Asylum	—N/a	Nominated	
2013	Outstanding Main Title Design	American Horror Story: Asylum	—N/a	Nominated	
2014	Outstanding Miniseries	American Horror Story: Coven	—N/a	Nominated	
2014	Outstanding Writing for a Miniseries, Movie or a Dramatic Special	American Horror Story: Coven	"Bitchcraft"	Nominated	
2014	Outstanding Television Movie	The Normal Heart	—N/a	Won	
2014	Outstanding Directing for a Miniseries, Movie or Dramatic Special	The Normal Heart	—N/a	Nominated	
2015	Outstanding Limited Series	American Horror Story: Freak Show	—N/a	Nominated	
2015	Outstanding Directing for a Miniseries, Movie or Dramatic Special	American Horror Story: Freak Show	"Monsters Among Us"	Nominated	
2015	Outstanding Main Title Design	American Horror Story: Freak Show	—N/a	Nominated	
2015	Outstanding Short-Format Nonfiction Program	American Horror Story: Extra-Ordinary Artists	—N/a	Nominated	
2016	Outstanding Limited Series	The People v. O. J. Simpson: American Crime Story	—N/a	Won	
2016	Outstanding Directing for a Limited Series, Movie or Dramatic Special	The People v. O. J. Simpson: American Crime Story	"From the Ashes of Tragedy"	Nominated	
2016	Outstanding Short Form Nonfiction or Reality Series	Inside Look: The People v. O. J. Simpson: American Crime Story	—N/a	Won	
2017	Outstanding Limited Series	Feud: Bette and Joan	—N/a	Nominated	
2017	Outstanding Directing for a Limited Series, Movie or Dramatic Special	Feud: Bette and Joan	"And the Winner Is... (The Oscars of 1963)"	Nominated	
2017	Outstanding Writing for a Limited Series, Movie or Dramatic Special	Feud: Bette and Joan	"And the Winner Is... (The Oscars of 1963)"	Nominated	
2017	Outstanding Writing for a Limited Series, Movie or Dramatic Special	Feud: Bette and Joan	"Pilot"	Nominated	
2017	Outstanding Main Title Design	Feud: Bette and Joan	—N/a	Nominated	
2017	Outstanding Short Form Nonfiction or Reality Series	Feud: Bette and Joan: Inside Look	—N/a	Nominated	
2018	Outstanding Limited Series	The Assassination of Gianni Versace: American Crime Story	—N/a	Won	
2018	Outstanding Directing for a Limited Series, Movie or Dramatic Special	The Assassination of Gianni Versace: American Crime Story	"The Man Who Would Be Vogue"	Won	
2018	Outstanding Short Form Nonfiction or Reality Series	The Assassination of Gianni Versace: American Crime Story: America's Obsessions	—N/a	Nominated	
2019	Outstanding Drama Series	Pose	—N/a	Nominated	
2019	Outstanding Short Form Nonfiction or Reality Series	Pose: Identity, Family, Community (Inside Look)	—N/a	Nominated	
2020	Outstanding Short Form Nonfiction or Reality Series	Pose: Identity, Family, Community	—N/a	Nominated	
2021	Outstanding Drama Series	Pose	—N/a	Nominated	
2021	Outstanding Writing for a Drama Series	Pose	"Series Finale"	Nominated	
2021	Outstanding Short Form Nonfiction or Reality Series	Pose: Identity, Family, Community	—N/a	Nominated	
2021	Outstanding Music Supervision	Halston	"The Party's Over"	Nominated	
2022	Outstanding Documentary or Nonfiction Series	The Andy Warhol Diaries	—N/a	Nominated	
2024	Outstanding Limited or Anthology Series	Monster: The Jeffrey Dahmer Story	—N/a	Nominated	
2025	Outstanding Limited or Anthology Series	Monsters: The Lyle and Erik Menendez Story	—N/a	Nominated	
2026	Outstanding Limited or Anthology Series	Love Story: John F. Kennedy Jr. & Carolyn Bessette	—N/a	Nominated	
2026	Outstanding Short Form Nonfiction or Reality Series	Love Story: John F. Kennedy Jr. & Carolyn Bessette – A Love Untold	—N/a	Nominated	
International Emmy Awards
2012	International Emmy Founders Award †	—N/a	—N/a	Won	

=== Golden Globe Awards ===
Year	Category	Work	Result	Ref.
2014	Best Limited or Anthology Series or Television Film	American Horror Story: Coven	Nominated	
2015	Best Limited or Anthology Series or Television Film	The Normal Heart	Nominated	
2016	Best Limited or Anthology Series or Television Film	American Horror Story: Hotel	Nominated	
2017	Best Limited or Anthology Series or Television Film	The People v. O. J. Simpson: American Crime Story	Won	
2018	Best Limited or Anthology Series or Television Film	Feud: Bette and Joan	Nominated	
2023	Carol Burnett Award †	—N/a	Won	

=== Grammy Awards ===
Year	Category	Work	Result	Ref.
2011	Best Compilation Soundtrack Album	Glee: The Music, Volume 1	Nominated	
2012	Best Compilation Soundtrack Album	Glee: The Music, Volume 4	Nominated	

=== Tony Awards ===
Year	Category	Work	Result	Ref.
2016	Best Revival of a Play	Long Day's Journey into Night	Nominated	
2019	Best Revival of a Play	The Boys in the Band	Won	

== Major guild awards ==
=== Directors Guild of America Awards ===
Year	Category	Work	Episode	Result	Ref.
2010	Comedy Series	Glee	"Pilot"	Nominated	
2011	Comedy Series	Glee	"The Power of Madonna"	Nominated	
2015	Miniseries or TV Film	The Normal Heart	—N/a	Nominated	
2017	Dramatic Series	The People v. O. J. Simpson: American Crime Story	"From the Ashes of Tragedy"	Nominated	

=== Producers Guild of America Awards ===
Year	Category	Work	Result	Ref.
2005	Outstanding Producer of Episodic Television, Drama	Nip/Tuck	Nominated	
2011	Outstanding Producer of Episodic Television, Comedy	Glee	Nominated	
2012	Outstanding Producer of Episodic Television, Comedy	Glee	Nominated	
2013	Outstanding Producer of Long-Form Television	American Horror Story: Murder House	Nominated	
2014	Outstanding Producer of Long-Form Television	American Horror Story: Asylum	Nominated	
2015	Outstanding Producer of Long-Form Television	American Horror Story: Coven; American Horror Story: Freak Show	Nominated	
2015	Outstanding Producer of Long-Form Television	The Normal Heart	Nominated	
2015	Stanley Kramer Award †	The Normal Heart	Won	
2016	Outstanding Producer of Long-Form Television	American Horror Story: Hotel	Nominated	
2017	Outstanding Producer of Long-Form Television	The People v. O. J. Simpson: American Crime Story	Won	
2018	Outstanding Producer of Long-Form Television	Feud: Bette and Joan	Nominated	
2018	Norman Lear Achievement Award in Television †	—N/a	Won	
2019	Outstanding Producer of Limited Series Television	The Assassination of Gianni Versace: American Crime Story	Won	
2019	Outstanding Producer of Limited or Anthology Series Television	Monster: The Jeffrey Dahmer Story	Nominated	

=== Writers Guild of America Awards ===
Year	Category	Work	Result	Ref.
2010	New Series	Glee	Nominated	
2010	Comedy Series	Glee	Nominated	
2011	Comedy Series	Glee	Nominated	
2016	Long Form – Original	American Horror Story: Hotel	Nominated	
2018	Long Form – Original	American Horror Story: Cult	Nominated	
2018	Long Form – Original	Feud: Bette and Joan	Nominated	
2019	New Series	Pose	Nominated	
2021	Long Form – Original	Hollywood	Nominated	
2021	Long Form – Original	American Horror Story: Double Feature	Nominated	
2021	Long Form – Adapted	Halston	Nominated	

== Miscellaneous awards ==
Awards and nominations received by Jessica Lange
Award	Year (Note: The listed year refers to the date of the ceremony.)	Category	Work	Result	Ref.
ADG Excellence in Production Design Awards	2021	Cinematic Imagery Award †	—N/a	Won	
African-American Film Critics Association	2019	Icon Award †	—N/a	Won	
Astra TV Awards (Note: At the time called Hollywood Critics Association TV Awards.)	2022	Best Directing in a Broadcast Network or Cable Limited Series, Anthology Series, or Movie	Impeachment: American Crime Story (episode: "Man Handled")	Nominated	
Black Reel TV Awards	2019	Outstanding Writing, Drama Series	Pose (episode: "Love is the Message")	Nominated	
Black Reel TV Awards	2020	Outstanding Drama Series	Pose	Won	
Black Reel TV Awards	2020	Outstanding Writing, Drama Series	Pose (episode: "Never Knew Love Like This Before")	Nominated	
Black Reel TV Awards	2020	Outstanding Television Movie or Limited Series	Hollywood	Nominated	
Black Reel TV Awards	2021	Outstanding Music	Pose	Nominated	
Costume Designers Guild Awards	2019	Distinguished Collaborator Award †	—N/a	Won	
Critics' Choice Television Awards	2014	Louis XIII Genius Award †	—N/a	Won	
Dorian Awards	2014	Wilde Artist of the Year	—N/a	Won	
Dorian Awards	2015	TV Director of the Year	The Normal Heart	Nominated	
Dorian Awards	2019	Wilde Artist of the Year	—N/a	Won	
Dorian Awards	2020	Wilde Artist of the Decade	—N/a	Nominated	
GLAAD Media Awards	2020	GLAAD Vito Russo Award †	—N/a	Won	
Gotham Awards	2018	Breakthrough Series – Long Form	Pose	Nominated	
Gotham Awards	2021	Industry Tribute †	—N/a	Won	
Gotham Awards	2022	Breakthrough Nonfiction Series	The Andy Warhol Diaries	Nominated	
Guild of Music Supervisors Awards	2020	Best Music Supervision – Television Drama	Pose (season 2)	Nominated	
Guild of Music Supervisors Awards	2021	Best Music Supervision – Television Drama	Hollywood	Nominated	
Hollywood Film Awards	2006	Hollywood Breakthrough Director	Running with Scissors	Won	
Humanitas Prize	2011	60 Minute Network or Syndicated Television	Glee (episode: "Wheels")	Won	
Humanitas Prize	2020	Drama Teleplay	Pose (episode: "In My Heels")	Nominated	
ICG Publicists Awards	2017	Television Showman of the Year †	—N/a	Won	
Make-Up Artists & Hair Stylists Guild Awards	2017	Distinguished Artisan Award †	—N/a	Won	
NAACP Image Awards	2022	Outstanding Writing in a Dramatic Series	Pose (episode: "Series Finale")	Nominated	
VH1	2018	VH1 Trailblazer Honors †	—N/a	Won	

== Honors ==
Organization	Year	Ref.
Hollywood Walk of Fame	2018	
Television Academy Hall of Fame	2025	
