= John Elder Robison =

American author (born 1957)

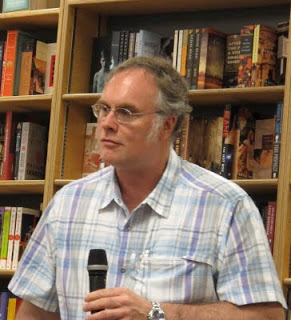
- Robison in May 2011
- Born: August 13, 1957 (age 69); Athens, Georgia, U.S.
- Occupation: Memoirist
- Children: 1
- Relatives: Augusten Burroughs (brother)
- Writing career
- Period: 2007–present
- Subjects: Memoir, autism
- Notable works: Look Me in the Eye (2007), Be Different (2011), Switched On (2016)
- Website: jerobison.blogspot.com

John Elder Robison (born August 13, 1957) is an American author who wrote the 2007 memoir Look Me in the Eye, detailing his life with undiagnosed Asperger syndrome and savant abilities, and three other books. Robison wrote his first book at age 49.

== Early life ==
Robison was born in Athens, Georgia, while his parents were attending the University of Georgia. He is the son of poet Margaret Robison (1935–2015) and John G. Robison (1935–2005), former head of the philosophy department at the University of Massachusetts Amherst. Robison later dropped out of high school.

== Personal life ==
He married three times and has one son.

He is the elder brother of memoirist Augusten Burroughs, who also wrote about his childhood in the memoir Running with Scissors.

He was diagnosed with the now-defunct autism subtype Asperger syndrome at age 40.

In 2011, Robison was featured on an episode of Ingenious Minds, which discussed some of the transcranial magnetic stimulation experiments he underwent to improve his social cognition.

== Career ==
Robison has had several careers. In the 1970s, he worked as an engineer in the music business where he is best known for creating the signature special effects guitars played by the band KISS. In the 1980s, Robison worked for electronics manufacturers Milton Bradley Company (electronic games), Simplex (fire alarms and building control), and ISOREG (power conditioning systems). Robison wrote his first book at age 49.

=== Books ===
In Look Me in the Eye, Robison describes growing up with no diagnosis of his autism, but aware that he was different, and how he was first diagnosed by a therapist friend when he was 40 years old. After writing that book, Robison became active in the planning of autism research and in autistic advocacy.

Robison is also the author of Be Different (2011), a how-to guide for grown-ups with autism; Raising Cubby (2013), the story of raising his autistic son; and Switched On (2016), which tells the story of his participation as a research subject in brain studies using transcranial magnetic stimulation (TMS) at the Beth Israel Deaconess Medical Center, a teaching hospital of Harvard Medical School.

=== Automobiles ===
Since 1987, Robison has run a successful car specialty shop. He is the founder of J.E. Robison Service Co., Inc. in Springfield, Mass. Robison Service specializes in high-end European automobile service and restoration. Robison Service is also part of the Springfield Automotive Complex, which is also home to an automotive training program, an inspection facility for commercial vehicles, general auto service operations, and Action EMS providing backup ambulance services in the Springfield area. From 2013 to 2018 the complex was home to the TCS Auto Program, a licensed special education high school that teaches life skills in the context of a working commercial auto complex. The school was a partnership of Robison and Northeast Center for Youth and Families of Easthampton, Mass. While that program ended, Robison's complex still supports and employs people with developmental differences.

=== Advocacy ===
Robison is active in the autistic rights movement. He volunteered at Autism Speaks as a member of their treatment and advisory boards, saying that he was interested in helping remediate the disabling aspects of autism. He resigned in 2013 following an op-ed released by Suzanne Wright, a co-founder of Autism Speaks. Robison and other members of the autism community criticized Wright for proclaiming that families affected by autism lived in "despair" and in "fear of the future". Robison has said that "disabilities are problems, but that doesn't mean that autism is a problem."

Since 2012, Robison has been the Neurodiversity Scholar in Residence at the College of William & Mary in Williamsburg, Virginia. Robison is also co-chair of the campus neurodiversity committee, which is housed in the president's office of diversity. Robison co-teaches neurodiversity courses at the Williamsburg and Washington, D.C. campuses.

From 2012 to 2021, Robison served as a member of the Interagency Autism Coordinating Committee (IACC) of the U.S. Department of Health and Human Services. The committee is responsible for producing the Strategic Plan for Autism for the federal government, and the Annual Summary of Advances in Autism Research. The committee reports to the Secretary of Health and Human Services, who oversees the Centers for Disease Control and Prevention (CDC), the National Institutes of Health (NIH), and the Health Resources and Services Administration (HRSA) autism programs. The committee also coordinates autism efforts with other government agencies, including the U.S. Department of Defense, U.S. Department of Education and the Social Security Administration (SSA).

Within the IACC and other government committees, Robison has taken the position that autistic people should have the lead voice in defining autism research goals.
