= Catherine Feeny =

American musician

- Born: Philadelphia, Pennsylvania, US
- Genres: Singer-songwriter
- Occupation: Singer-songwriter
- Instrument(s): Vocals guitar piano
- Labels: Tallgrass; Charisma

Catherine Feeny (born 1976) is an American singer-songwriter based in Portland, Oregon.

She grew up in Norristown, Pennsylvania, studied in Washington, D.C., and relocated to Los Angeles, where she started seriously writing her own songs. Her first album Catherine Feeny was produced by fellow singer-songwriter Joe Purdy and was released in the UK in January 2003. Shortly after, she met producer Sebastian Rogers, who then produced her second album Hurricane Glass, which was released in the UK in June 2006. It includes the single "Mr Blue" which features in the films Running with Scissors (2006) and Miss Conception (2008), as well as in the final scene of the series finale of the adult animated series BoJack Horseman in 2020.

She originally released Hurricane Glass on her manager's Tallgrass Records before signing to EMI in 2007. She is published by Warner-Chappell.

Feeny lived in Norwich for several years before moving in 2008 to Oregon, where she released her third album, entitled People in the Hole. The title track and only single from the album was featured in U.S. television series Mercy and One Tree Hill.

After moving to Oregon, Feeny and producer Sebastian Rogers married, and formed the band Come Gather Round Us with Jon Neufeld (Black Prairie) and Mike Danner. The band released two folk albums, Remember Where You Are and Despair?.

Feeny and Rogers went to New York in October 2011 to participate in the Occupy Wall Street protests and slept in Zuccotti Park until they and other protesters were arrested and forcibly removed on November 15. This experience was the catalyst for Feeny's fourth album, America, which was recorded in Portland, Oregon, at Bungalow 9 with musicians Matt Carson, Nate Crockett (Horsefeathers), and Daniel Dixon (Greylag), and producer Sebastian Rogers.

While at Occupy Wall Street, Feeny met playwright and activist Eve Ensler (Vagina Monologues). After hearing Feeny's Occupy-inspired anthem "United", Ensler commissioned her to write a song for her international organization One Billion Rising, which focuses on ending violence against women.

She has toured with Hal, Aberfeldy, Martha Wainwright, Dr. John, John Prine, Suzanne Vega, and The Hotel Cafe Tour. She has accompanied Kelly Jones of the Stereophonics on the "Only The Names Have Been Changed" tour.

Feeny says she is influenced by the likes of Joni Mitchell, The Smiths, Ani Difranco, PJ Harvey, The Cure and Sinéad O'Connor.

== History ==
Before embarking on her solo career, she played in several bands as an adolescent, including LAMPshADE;, among others.

== Discography ==
=== Albums ===
- 2003: Catherine Feeny
- 2006: Hurricane Glass
- 2009: The People in the Hole
- 2012: America

=== EPs ===
- 2008 – Empty Buildings

=== Singles ===
- 2006 – Hurricane Glass
- 2007 – Mr. Blue
- 2007 – Touch Back Down
