= This Is How (disambiguation) =

This Is How is a 2012 self-help book by Augusten Burroughs.

This Is How also may refer to:

- "This Is How", song by Silverstein from This Is How the Wind Shifts 2013
- "This Is How", song by DJ Ghastly from The Mystifying Oracle
- This Is How, a 2009 novel by M. J. Hyland
- "This Is How (We Want You to Get High)", a song by George Michael released on the soundtrack of the 2019 film Last Christmas
