= Possible Side Effects =

- Author: Augusten Burroughs
- Language: English
- Genre: Memoir
- Publisher: St. Martin's Press
- Publication date: May 2006
- Publication place: United States
- Media type: Print
- Pages: 304 pp
- ISBN: 0-312-31596-1
- OCLC: 62790028
- Dewey Decimal: 813/.6 B 22
- LC Class: PS3552.U745 Z475 2006
- Preceded by: Magical Thinking
- Followed by: A Wolf at the Table

Possible Side Effects is a 2006 memoir by American writer Augusten Burroughs. The book contains stories from the life of Augusten Burroughs, ranging from his childhood to the near-present.

== Stories ==
Possible Side Effects contains the following stories:

1. Pest Control
2. Bloody Sunday
3. The Sacred Cow
4. Team Player
5. Killing John Updike
6. Attacked by Heart
7. The Wisdom Tooth
8. G. W. F. Seeks Same
9. Mint Threshold
10. Locked out
11. Getting to Know You
12. Kitty Kitty
13. Peep
14. Taking Tests, Taking Things
15. Unclear Sailing
16. Moving Violations
17. You've Come a Long Way Baby
18. The Forecast for Summer
19. Try Our New Single Black Mother Menu
20. The Georgia Thumper
21. Little Crucifixions
22. What's in a Name
23. The Wonder Boy
24. Fetch
25. Mrs. Chang
26. Julia's Child

== Reception ==
The book received primarily positive reviews, but there was much mention that his prior work, especially Running with Scissors, was better and Burroughs may be running out of material.

== Editions ==
- Burroughs, A. Possible Side Effects. New York: St. Martin's Press
