= Look Me in the Eye =

Book by John Elder Robinson

- Author: John Elder Robison
- Language: English
- Genre: Memoir
- Publisher: Three Rivers Press
- Publication date: September 25, 2007
- Publication place: United States
- Media type: Hardcover
- Pages: 304 pp.
- ISBN: 978-0-307-39598-6
- OCLC: 122309450
- Dewey Decimal: 362.196/8588320092 B 22
- LC Class: RC553.A88 R635 2007

Look Me in the Eye: My Life with Asperger's is a 2007 New York Times bestselling book by John Elder Robison, chronicling the author's life with Asperger syndrome and tough times growing up.

== Story ==
Published in 2007 on the Crown imprint of Random House, Look Me in the Eye describes how Robison grew up as a misfit in the 1960s, at a time when the Asperger syndrome diagnosis did not exist in the United States. The book describes how Robison learns to fit in, without actually knowing why he was different. His situation was made even more complicated at times by his neglectful and abusive father and a somewhat crazed mother. After dropping out of school, he had a sudden fascination with sound engineering and electronics. His strong interest led to unusual career choices, including time with Pink Floyd's sound company, making special effects for the band Kiss, designing electronic games and toys for Microvision, and starting his own business repairing and restoring expensive cars. Robison finally learned about Asperger syndrome in 1996, at age 39, and his life was transformed by the knowledge. He was first introduced to the public in his brother Augusten Burroughs' memoir Running with Scissors. He wrote Look Me in the Eye as his perspective of the family and his life in 2006, after the death of his father.

== Published editions ==
Look Me in the Eye was originally published in hardcover by the Crown imprint of Random House in the United States. The book is also available as a Random House Audiobook, with the abridged version narrated by Robison himself. The paperback was published by Three Rivers Press in September 2008. Look Me in the Eye was also published and distributed by Random House in Canada, Australia and New Zealand. The United Kingdom edition is available from Ebury Books.

In 2008, foreign language editions were published in Italy and France.

- Portuguese edition: Olhe Nos Meus Olhos – Minha vida com a Sindrome de Asperger, Larousse May 2008.
- German edition: Schau mich an! Mein Leben mit Asperger, Fackelträger Verlag, September 2008.
