= Magical thinking (disambiguation) =

Magical thinking is a set of related reasoning errors that are commonly associated with religionistic practices.

Magical thinking may also refer to:

- Magical Thinking (book), a memoir by writer Augusten Burroughs
- "Magical Thinking" (American Horror Story), an episode of the FX television series
- "Magical Thinking" (Supergirl), an episode of the CW television series

== See also ==
- The Year of Magical Thinking, a memoir by author Joan Didion
