= Dominic Waxing Lyrical =

Scottish musical group

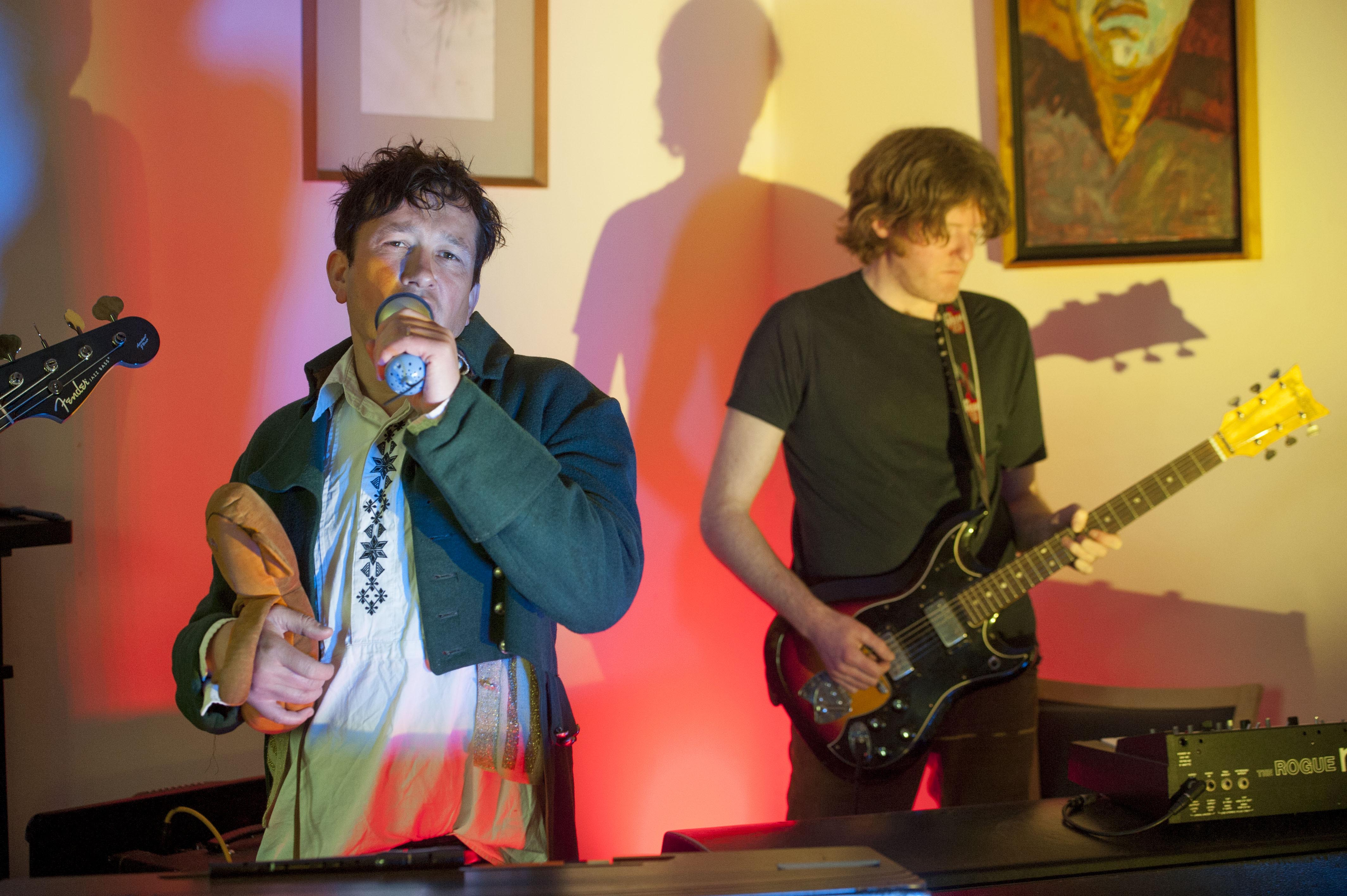
- Dominic Waxing Lyrical playing in 2014

Background information
- Origin: Edinburgh, United Kingdom
- Genres: Art rock, Folk
- Years active: 1994–present
- Labels: Tenement Records, Neptunes, Bosque, House of Dubois
- Members: Dominic Harris; Riley Briggs; Kenneth McIntosh; Murray Briggs
- Past members: Joel Sanderson; Ruby Worth; Ewan Hunter; Tom Bancroft; Neil Bateman; George McFall

Dominic Waxing Lyrical is a musical band from Edinburgh. The band is centered on their frontman, musician and songwriter Dominic Harris.

== History ==
Formed in 1994 by Dominic Harris and Joel Sanderson, the band's music and performances incorporated influences from medieval and renaissance poetry, and performance art. They first appeared on the UK indie music scene in the mid-90s. During this time they performed live and released a series of singles and an eponymous LP. Their music received radio plays from John Peel. And they were covered in zines and Melody Maker.

In 2015, they released a second album, Woodland Casual, and a series of singles, featuring musicians from Aberfeldy, Clean George IV and Badgewearer. The band also toured Central Scotland. The tour was performed on a barge, and included a date at Saughton Prison.

The band released a third album Rural Tonic in 2017 with orchestral players from Mr McFall's Chamber. They were subsequently recorded by the BBC in session with Mr McFall's Chamber and aired on BBC Radio by Lauren Laverne and Vic Galloway.

A fourth album 'Diminuet' released in 2024, was recorded in the United States with Ricky White of Kling Klang and Oi Polloi, and in Scotland.

== Discography ==
=== Albums ===
- Dominic Waxing Lyrical, Neptunes (1995)
- Woodland Casual, Tenement Records (2015)
- Rural Tonic, Tenement Records (2017)
- Diminuet, Tenement Records (2024)

=== Singles ===
- Victoria, Bosque 7" (1995)
- Change, Bosque 7" (1997)
- Dear Sir/Madam..., Bosque EP (1998)
- Part-Timers , House of Dubois EP (1998)
- Thursday (Searching), Tenement Records (2014)
- Fly, Tenement Records (2015)
- Swan Song, Tenement Records (2015)
- Susan Sontag, Tenement Records (2017)

=== Tracks on compilations ===
- Drowning, King, Cold Shoulder City and Roll Up! (acoustic versions) on Gallery - Edinburgh Songwriters' Showcase, Deadbeat (1994)
- Piss Staines, on Looking At The Earth From Neptune, And It Was Good, Neptunes (1996)
- Fly, Scarecrow, Lara and Cold Shoulder City on ...boats against the current..., Hedonist Productions (1996)
