= Ryan Murphy (producer) =

American television writer and producer

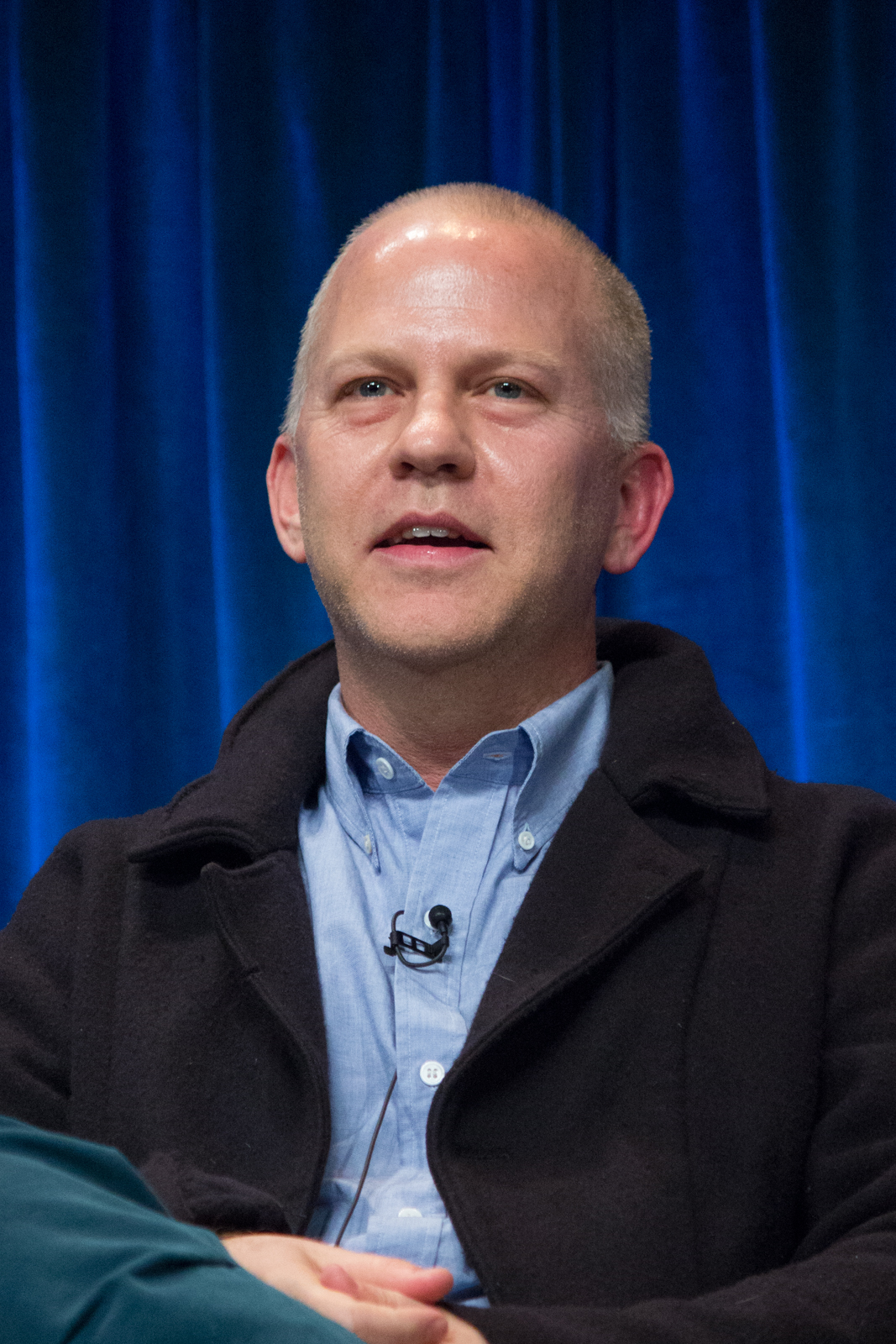
- Murphy in 2013
- Born: Ryan Patrick Murphy; November 9, 1965 (age 61); Indianapolis, Indiana, U.S.
- Education: Indiana University Bloomington (BA)
- Occupations: Television writer; director; producer
- Spouse: David Miller (m. 2012)
- Children: 3
- Writing career
- Years active: 1999–present
- Notable awards: Full list

Ryan Patrick Murphy (born November 9, 1965) is an American writer, director, and producer, working mainly in television. He has often been described as "the most powerful man" in modern television and signed the largest development deal in television history with Netflix. Murphy is noted for having created a shift in inclusive storytelling that "brought marginalized characters to the masses." His accolades include six Primetime Emmy Awards, two British Academy Film Awards, a Tony Award, four Producers Guild of America Awards and two Golden Globe Awards, including the honorary Carol Burnett Award.

He has created and produced a number of television series including Nip/Tuck (2003–2010), Glee (2009–2015), American Horror Story (2011–present), American Crime Story (2016–2021), Pose (2018–2021), 9-1-1 (2018–present), 9-1-1: Lone Star (2020–2025), Ratched (2020), American Horror Stories (2021–present), Monster (2022–present), The Watcher (2022–present), American Sports Story (2024), 9-1-1: Nashville (2025–present), Love Story (2026), and The Shards (2026). Murphy has also directed the 2006 film adaptation of Augusten Burroughs' memoir Running with Scissors, the 2010 film adaptation of Elizabeth Gilbert's memoir Eat, Pray, Love, the 2014 film adaptation of Larry Kramer's play The Normal Heart, and the 2020 film adaptation of the musical The Prom.

== Early life ==
Murphy was born on November 9, 1965, in Indianapolis, Indiana, where he was raised in a Catholic family. His ancestry includes Irish and Danish. He attended Catholic school from first through eighth grade, and graduated from Warren Central High School in Indianapolis. He has described his mother J. Andy Murphy as a "beauty queen who left it all to stay at home and take care of her two Wild sons". She wrote five books and worked in communications for over 20 years before retiring. His father worked in the newspaper industry as a circulation director before he retired after 30 years.

After coming out as gay at age 15, Murphy saw his first therapist, who found nothing wrong with him other than being "too precocious for his own good". During a 2012 interview on Inside the Actors Studio, Murphy claimed that he secretly dated "a lot of football players" in high school. He performed with a choir as a child, which would later inform his work on Glee.

Murphy attended Indiana University Bloomington, where he majored in journalism and was a member of the Singing Hoosiers vocal ensemble. He interned at The Washington Post in 1986. He was placed in the fashion and style section.

== Career ==
=== 1990–2008: Popular and Nip/Tuck ===
Murphy started as a journalist working for The Miami Herald, Los Angeles Times, New York Daily News, Knoxville News Sentinel and Entertainment Weekly. He began scriptwriting in the late 1990s, when Steven Spielberg purchased his script Why Can't I Be Audrey Hepburn?

Murphy started his career in television with the teen comedy series Popular, which he co-created with Gina Matthews. The series premiered on The WB on September 29, 1999, and ran for two seasons, ending in 2001. During the time, his production company Ryan Murphy Productions signed a deal with Warner Bros. Television. He then created the FX drama series Nip/Tuck, which premiered on July 18, 2003. In 2004, Murphy earned his first Primetime Emmy Award nomination for Outstanding Directing for a Drama Series. Murphy took the show's signature line, "Tell me what you don't like about yourself," from a plastic surgeon he met when he was a journalist researching an undercover story on plastic surgery in Beverly Hills. The series ended after six seasons in 2010.

In 2006, Murphy wrote the screenplay for and directed the feature film Running with Scissors, based on the memoir by Augusten Burroughs.

=== 2009–2017: Glee and American Horror Story ===
On May 19, 2009, Murphy's musical comedy-drama series, Glee, premiered on Fox. He co-created the series with Brad Falchuk and Ian Brennan. In its early seasons, the show was critically praised. Murphy won his first Primetime Emmy Award for directing the pilot episode. The series concluded in 2015 following its sixth season. Murphy was one of four executive producers on the reality television series The Glee Project, which premiered on Oxygen on June 12, 2011. The show featured a group of contestants vying for the prize of a seven-episode arc on Glee, with someone being eliminated each week, until the winner is chosen in the final episode. The show was renewed for a second season, which ended up being its last. Murphy was openly critical of several prominent bands for not releasing music for use in Glee, for which he subsequently apologized. In 2010, Murphy directed an adaptation of Elizabeth Gilbert's memoir Eat, Pray, Love. The film was a box office success but a critical failure, receiving harsh reviews criticizing its pacing and lack of credibility. To date, the film has grossed $204,482,125 worldwide.

Murphy and Falchuk created the anthology series American Horror Story, which premiered on FX on October 5, 2011. Most of the same cast have played different characters in different settings each subsequent season. Murphy and Glee co-executive producer Ali Adler created the half-hour comedy The New Normal, which premiered on NBC on September 10, 2012. The series was based on Murphy's own experiences of having a child via surrogate, with the main characters, Bryan and David, named for Ryan and his husband. The series was ultimately cancelled after one season.

Murphy next directed the 2014 television film adaptation of Larry Kramer's Broadway play The Normal Heart. Murphy then collaborated with The Normal Heart executive producer Jason Blum to produce a metasequel to the cult-classic horror film The Town That Dreaded Sundown. The film was the directorial debut of Alfonso Gomez-Rejon and was also released in 2014. In October 2014, FX greenlit a companion anthology series, American Crime Story, which Murphy and Falchuk executive produce. The series premiered on February 2, 2016. Murphy, Falchuk and Brennan next co-created the comedy-horror series Scream Queens, which premiered on Fox on September 22, 2015. The series was cancelled after two seasons. Murphy's next project, the drama anthology series Feud, premiered on FX in 2017. The first season focused on the rivalry between Bette Davis and Joan Crawford on the set of their 1962 film What Ever Happened to Baby Jane?

=== 2018–present: 9-1-1, Pose and Netflix productions ===
In 2018, Murphy co-created the police procedural drama 9-1-1 and also served as its director, writer and executive producer.

With newcomer Steven Canals, Murphy and Falchuk launched a new series, Pose, set in the Ball community in mid-1980s New York City. Murphy had wanted to adapt and knock off Paris Is Burning as a series and Canals had been writing a script while at graduate school centered on a young African American teen made homeless for being gay, who moved to New York with dreams of going to dance school and who became adopted by a House mother. Joining Canals, Murphy and Falchuk in the writing room were Our Lady J and Janet Mock, who Murphy also encouraged to direct an episode, making her the first trans woman of colour to do so, as well as the first trans woman of colour in a TV series writing room. The series premiered on FX on June 3, 2018, attracting critical acclaim. The first season boasted the largest cast of transgender actors ever for a scripted network series, with over 50 transgender characters all played by trans actors. On July 12, 2018, it was announced that the series had been renewed for a second season, which premiered in 2019.

In May 2018, ahead of the Pose premiere, Murphy announced that he would donate all of his profits from the series to charitable organizations working with LGBT people, tweeting different non-profits including Sylvia Rivera Law Project, Transgender Legal Defense & Education Fund, and Callen-Lorde Community Health Center telling Variety that: "The thing that struck me in talking to so many of them, was how much they've struggled, how under attack they feel, how many of them find it difficult getting healthcare, and finding jobs. I just decided I need to do more than just making a show for this community. I want to reach out and help this community."

In 2018, Netflix signed Murphy for a development deal with compensation of $300 million over a period of five years. In September 2019, The Politician was released on Netflix to generally positive reviews. The series was nominated for two Golden Globe Awards and renewed for a second season, which was released in mid-2020. Murphy then co-created the 9-1-1 spin-off series 9-1-1: Lone Star, which premiered on Fox in January 2020. In May 2020, Murphy's period miniseries Hollywood was released to mixed reviews. Murphy served as co-creator, writer and director for the series. In June 2020, in honor of the 50th anniversary of the first LGBTQ Pride parade, Queerty named him among the fifty heroes "leading the nation toward equality, acceptance, and dignity for all people". In 2021, Murphy wrote for and executive produced Halston, a miniseries about the designer Halston starring Ewan McGregor.

Alongside his Glee co-creator Ian Brennan, Murphy co-created the true crime anthology series Monster (2022–present) for Netflix. Initially intended to be a ten-part limited series, the first season was titled Dahmer – Monster: The Jeffrey Dahmer Story (2022) and became one of the most-watched Netflix series of all time. The second season, Monsters: The Lyle and Erik Menendez Story, was released in September 2024. The third season, Monster: The Ed Gein Story, was released in October 2025 and the fourth series, Monster: The Lizzie Borden Story was released in 2026. All four seasons were met with commercial success but mixed reviews, with most critics criticizing the ethics of true crime media and Murphy's approach to the victims.

In May 2025, FX ordered The Shards, a horror-thriller series based on the semi-autobiographical 2023 novel of the same name by Bret Easton Ellis. The series, set in 1980s Los Angeles, follows a teenager who becomes obsessed with a serial killer terrorizing the city. Murphy executive produces via Ryan Murphy Productions, with Max Winkler attached to direct and executive produce. The cast includes Igby Rigney, Kaia Gerber, Homer Gere, Hayes Warner, Graham Campbell, and Wes Bentley. Filming began in November 2025 and wrapped in March 2026.

== In the media ==
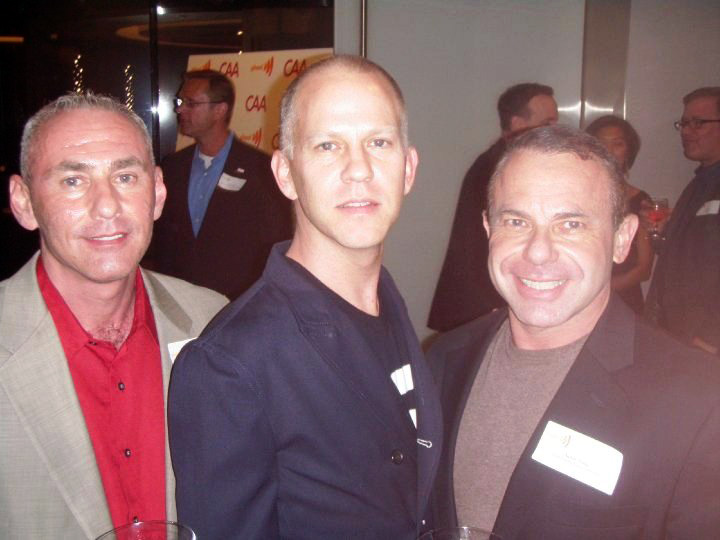
(l-r) Governor appointee Don Norte, Murphy, and Norte's husband, gay activist Kevin Norte, at Spring Time GLAAD 2010's charitable event in Century City, Los Angeles, California.

In October 2015, Murphy received the Award of Inspiration from amfAR, The Foundation for AIDS Research for his contributions to TV and film as well as his work in the fight against AIDS.

In 2017, Murphy launched the Half Initiative, which aims to make Hollywood more inclusive by creating equal opportunities for women and minorities behind the camera. Less than one year after launching Half, Ryan Murphy Television's director slate hired 60% women directors and 90% met its women and minority requirement. In conjunction with the hiring goals, he helped many people with the Initiative launched the Half-Director Mentorship Program in which every director on every Ryan Murphy Television production mentors emerging women and minority directors through pre-production and post-production along with offering a significant stipend for their commitment. Filmmaker Kristin Fairweather, the first recipient of a HALF award, described her experience in an interview with Screen Comment's Rudy Cecera.

== Unproduced projects ==
Murphy has created and produced various unsuccessful television pilots. The WB's sitcom pilot St. Sass, starring Delta Burke and Heather Matarazzo, was not picked up. In 2008, Murphy wrote and directed the FX pilot Pretty/Handsome, which also was not picked up. By April 2013, HBO had given a pilot order for Murphy's sexuality drama Open, which began filming in late 2013. By September 2014, HBO had opted not to proceed to series.

Murphy also had several films in development: Dirty Tricks, a political comedy based on the play by John Jeter, One Hit Wonders, a musical comedy, and a sequel to The Normal Heart. He was also courted by studios to direct film versions of the Broadway musicals The Rocky Horror Show, Wicked, and Annie.

In 2014, Murphy was developing a feature film of the life of reclusive heiress Huguette Clark, based on the best-selling book Empty Mansions: The Mysterious Life of Huguette Clark and the Spending of a Great American Fortune. In 2018, Murphy was developing a MeToo anthology series called Consent. In 2019, Murphy was developing a 10-part miniseries adaptation of A Chorus Line and a biopic on the actress Marlene Dietrich starring Jessica Lange for Netflix. There have been no development on these projects since their announcement.

In 2020, Rob Lowe revealed via Instagram that he was in discussions with Murphy to play Joe Exotic in a scripted adaptation of Tiger King.

== Personal life ==
While Murphy grew up in a Catholic household, he is "done with the Church", having left it; however, he still occasionally goes to church. He serves on the National Advisory Board of Young Storytellers. He once owned a house designed by renowned mid-century modern architect Carl Maston.

In an interview about his show Pose, which is set in 1987, during the height of the initial AIDS crisis, Murphy described his concern about contracting HIV while at college, getting tested frequently even when celibate.

Murphy has been married to photographer David Miller since July 2012. They have three sons born via surrogacy.

== Filmography ==
=== Film ===
Year	Title	Director	Writer	Producer	Notes
1999	The Furies	No	Yes	No	Short film
2006	Running with Scissors	Yes	Yes	Yes	
2010	Eat Pray Love	Yes	Yes	No	
2011	Glee: The 3D Concert Movie	No	No	Yes	Documentary concert film
2014	The Town That Dreaded Sundown	No	No	Yes	
2020	Circus of Books	No	No	Executive	Documentary
2020	A Secret Love	No	No	Yes	Documentary
2020	The Boys in the Band	No	No	Yes	
2020	The Prom	Yes	No	Yes	
2021	Pray Away	No	No	Executive	Documentary
2022	Mr. Harrigan's Phone	No	No	Yes	

=== Television ===
Numbers in directing and writing credits refer to number of episodes.

Year	Title	Credited as				Network	Notes
Year	Title	Creator	Director	Writer	Executive Producer	Network	Notes
1999–2001	Popular	Yes	Yes (2)	Yes (18)	Yes	The WB	
2003–2010	Nip/Tuck	Yes	Yes (8)	Yes (25)	Yes	FX	
2009–2015	Glee	Yes	Yes (8)	Yes (31)	Yes	Fox	
2011–present	American Horror Story	Yes	Yes (4)	Yes (24)	Yes	FX	Anthology
2012–2013	The New Normal	Yes	Yes (4)	Yes (5)	Yes	NBC	
2014	The Normal Heart	No	Yes	No	Yes	HBO	TV movie
2015–2016	Scream Queens	Yes	Yes (1)	Yes (8)	Yes	Fox	
2016–2021	American Crime Story	No	Yes (7)	No	Yes	FX	Anthology
2017–2024	Feud	Yes	Yes (3)	Yes (2)	Yes	FX	Anthology
2018–present	9-1-1	Yes	No	Yes (3)	Yes	Fox/ABC	
2018–2021	Pose	Yes	Yes (3)	Yes (7)	Yes	FX	
2019–2020	The Politician	Yes	Yes (1)	Yes (7)	Yes	Netflix	
2020–2025	9-1-1: Lone Star	Yes	No	Yes (1)	Yes	Fox	
2020	Hollywood	Yes	Yes (1)	Yes (6)	Yes	Netflix	Miniseries
2020	Ratched	Yes (development)	Yes (2)	No	Yes	Netflix	
2021	Halston	No	No	Yes (4)	Yes	Netflix	Miniseries
2021–2024	American Horror Stories	Yes	No	Yes (2)	Yes	FX on Hulu	Anthology
2022–present	Monster	Yes	No	Yes (6)	Yes	Netflix	Anthology
2022–present	The Watcher	Yes	Yes (2)	Yes (6)	Yes	Netflix	
2024	American Sports Story	No	No	No	Yes	FX	Anthology
2024	Grotesquerie	Yes	Yes (1)	Yes (10)	Yes	FX	
2024–2025	Doctor Odyssey	Yes	No	Yes (6)	Yes	ABC	
2025	Mid-Century Modern	No	No	No	Yes	Hulu	
2025–present	9-1-1: Nashville	Yes	No	Yes (3)	Yes	ABC	
2025–present	All's Fair	Yes	Yes (1)	Yes (5)	Yes	Hulu	
2026	The Beauty	Yes	Yes (2)	Yes (11)	Yes		
2026–present	Love Story	No	No	No	Yes	FX	Anthology
2026–present	The Shards	Yes	Yes (2)	Yes (4)	Yes	FX	
2027	Untitled Glee Reboot †	TBA	TBA	TBA	Yes	Hulu	

=== Unsold TV pilots ===
Year	Title	Director	Writer	Executive Producer
2002	St. Sass	Yes	No	Yes
2008	Pretty/Handsome	Yes	Yes	Yes
2014	Open	Yes	Yes	Yes

=== Non-fiction TV series ===
Year	Title	Director	Producer	Notes
2011–2012	The Glee Project	No	Executive	Reality series
2014	American Horror Story Freak Show: Extra-Ordinary-Artists	Yes	No	
2016	Inside Look: The People v. O.J. Simpson – American Crime Story	No	Yes	
2017	Inside Look: Feud – Bette and Joan	No	Executive	
2017–2018	Inside Look: The Assassination of Gianni Versace – American Crime Story	No	Executive	
2022	The Andy Warhol Diaries	No	Executive	Limited docuseries

== Frequent collaborators ==
Throughout Murphy's various film and television projects, he has worked with various actors and actresses repeatedly. This includes Jessica Lange, Gwyneth Paltrow, Niecy Nash-Betts, Sarah Paulson, Evan Peters, Nathan Lane, Leslie Grossman, Kathy Bates, Angela Bassett, Darren Criss, Matt Bomer, Patti LuPone, Emma Roberts, Billie Lourd, John Stamos, and Naomi Watts among many others. Sarah Paulson has appeared the most frequently in 7 different television projects while Matt Bomer, Cameron Cowperthwaite, Leslie Grossman, Billie Lourd, Niecy Nash-Betts, Hudson Oz, and Sophie von Haselberg have all appeared in 5.

Note the table below only lists frequent collaborators from Murphy's television series, with several actors listed also appearing in his films.

Frequent actor collaborations (2 or more projects)
Work Actor	Popular (1999–2001)	Nip/Tuck (2003–2010)	Glee (2009–2015)	American Horror Story (2011–present)	The New Normal (2012–2013)	Scream Queens (2015–2016)	American Crime Story (2016–present)	Feud (2017–present)	9-1-1 (2018–present)	Pose (2018–2021)	The Politician (2019–2020)	9-1-1: Lone Star (2020–present)	Hollywood (2020)	Ratched (2020)	Halston (2021)	American Horror Stories (2021–present)	Monster (2022–present)	The Watcher (2022–present)	American Sports Story (2024)	Grotesquerie (2024)	Doctor Odyssey (2024–2025)	Mid-Century Modern (2025)	All's Fair (2025-present)	The Beauty (2026)	Love Story (2026)	The Shards (2026)	Total roles (in different shows)
Max Adler			Dave Karofsky						Sam																		2
Dianna Agron			Quinn Fabray																		Katherine Massey						2
Laura Allen				Rosie (Note: Appeared on American Horror Story: Cult.)					Marcy Nash																		2
Jacob Artist			Jake Puckerman	Todd Connors (Note: Appeared on American Horror Story: Roanoke.)																							2
Jennifer Aspen			Kendra Giardi			Mandy Greenwell			Lorraine Collins																		3
Ashlie Atkinson				Susan Pratt (Note: Appeared on American Horror Story: Delicate.)			Juanita Broaddrick (Note: Appeared on Impeachment: American Crime Story.)																				2
Jessica Barden																Bestie Casting Chairwoman Hailey Doherty	Nance O'Neil (Note: Appeared on Monster: The Lizzie Borden Story.)										2
Jaylen Barron									Katie										Shayanna Jenkins								2
Angela Bassett				Marie Laveau (Note: Appeared on American Horror Story: Coven.) (Note: Appeared on American Horror Story: Apocalypse.) (Note: Appeared on American Horror Story: 13.) Desiree Dupree (Note: Appeared on American Horror Story: Freak Show.) Ramona Royale (Note: Appeared on American Horror Story: Hotel.) Monet Tumusiime					Athena Grant			Athena Grant									Athena Grant						4
Kathy Bates				Madame Delphine LaLaurie Ethel Darling Iris Holloway Agnes Mary Winstead Ms. Miriam Mead				Joan Blondell (Note: Appeared on Feud: Bette and Joan.)																			2
Ella Beatty								Kerry O'Shea (Note: Appeared on Feud: Capote vs. The Swans.)									Lizzie Borden										2
Willam Belli		Cherry Peck	Party guest		Nana Drag Queen																						3
Wes Bentley				Edward Mordrake John Lowe Dylan Conrad																						Terry Schaffer	2
Kate Berlant																					Agnes Simkin		Devin Samartino				2
Sandra Bernhard				High Priestess Hannah Putt Fran Levinsky (Note: Appeared on American Horror Story: NYC.)						Nurse Judy Kubrak																	2
Leslie Bibb	Brooke McQueen	Naomi Gaines																									2
Matt Bomer			Cooper Anderson	Andy Stiles Donovan Holloway Crack'd Narrator	Monty											Michael Winslow						Jerry Frank					5
Barry Bostwick		Roger Payne	Tim Stanwick		Marty Sawyer																						3
Jamie Brewer				Adelaide Langdon (Note: Appeared on American Horror Story: Murder House.) Nan Marjorie Hedda												Adelaide Langdon											2
Jon Jon Briones				Ariel Augustus			Modesto Cunanan (Note: Appeared on The Assassination of Gianni Versace: American Crime Story.)							Dr. Richard Hanover										Dr. Dane Dilegre			4
Connie Britton				Vivien Harmon			Faye Resnick (Note: Appeared on The People v. O. J. Simpson: American Crime Story.)		Abby Clark																		3
Casey Thomas Brown				Hans Henkes												Jordan											2
Cocoa Brown							Jeanette "Queen B" Harris		Carla Price																		2
Chad Buchanan				Stu												Rory											2
Dominic Burgess				Phil Devlin Hamish Moss				Victor Buono				Dave Sheffield					John Wayne Gacy (Note: Appeared on Dahmer – Monster: The Jeffrey Dahmer Story.)										4
Dyllón Burnside										Ricky Evangelista						James Malcolm	Ronald Flowers										3
Courtney B. Vance							Johnnie Cochran													Marshall Tryon							2
Charlie Carver				Adam Carpenter										Huck Finnigan													2
Nicholas Alexander Chavez																	Lyle Menendez (Note: Appeared on Monsters: The Lyle and Erik Menendez Story.)			Dr. Charlie Mayhew							2
Kenneth Choi			Dr. Wu				Lance Ito		Howie Han			Howie Han															4
Claudia Christian		Dawn							Captain Elaine Maynard																		2
Debra Christofferson				Mrs. Stone (Note: Appeared on American Horror Story: Asylum.)					Sue Blevins																		2
Jennifer Coolidge		Candy Richards	Whitney S. Pierce															Karen Calhoun									3
Frances Conroy		Jane Fields		Moira O'Hara Shachath Myrtle Snow Gloria Mott Mama Polk Bebe Babbitt Belle Noir (Note: Appeared on American Horror Story: Double Feature.)																							2
Mark Consuelos				Spivey	Chris				Tripp Hauser																		3
David Corenswet											River Barkley		Jack Castello														2
Rick Cosnett									Julian Enes												Corey						2
Cameron Cowperthwaite				Speedwagon				Michael Parks				Grant Harlan				Charlie Wyatt	Steven Hicks										5
Darren Criss			Blaine Anderson	Justin			Andrew Cunanan						Raymond Ainsley														4
Angel Bismark Curiel										Lil Papi Evangelista						Finn											2
Earlene Davis			Andrea Carmichael					Agnes Moorehead	Entitled Woman								Sharon										4
Judy Davis								Hedda Hopper						Nurse Betsy Buckett													2
Rebecca Dayan				Maria Wycoff Alana Delarue											Elsa Peretti	Dr. Enid Perle											3
Loretta Devine			Sister Mary Constance																		Jill Manafort						2
Vincent D'Onofrio														Governor George Wilburn										Byron Forst			2
Laura Dreyfuss			Maddison McCarthy								McAfee Westbrook													Jennifer King			3
Noma Dumezweni										Tasha Jackson								Theodora Birch								Ms. Rogers	3
Tiffany Dupont									Ali Martin							Addy Gantz											2
Clea DuVall	Wanda Rickets			Wendy Peyser																							2
James Earl			Azimio Adams			Chamberlain Jackson																					2
Christine Ebersole				Anna Leigh Leighton						Bobbi																	2
Billy Eichner				Harrison Wilton Tex Watson Brock Mutt Nutter			Matt Drudge																	Waylen Lemming			3
Christine Estabrook		Sheila Carlton		Marcy the Realtor					Gloria Wagner																		3
Noah Fearnley																					Valet				Michael Bergin		2
Cody Fern				Michael Langdon Xavier Plympton (Note: Appeared on American Horror Story: 1984.) Valiant Thor			David Madson									Stan Vogel Thomas Browne											3
Celia Finkelstein				Nurse Gladys												Nurse Gladys											2
Colby French				Wilson Fisher					Det. Andy Marks								Det. Patrick Kennedy										3
Seth Gabel				Jeffrey Dahmer												Pastor Walter Guy Brubaker		Andrew Pierce									3
Victor Garber			Mr. Schuester													David Woodrow Randolph											2
Kaia Gerber				Kendall Carr												Ruby McDaniel										Susan Reynolds	3
Gina Gershon			Pam Anderson																		Lenore Laurent						2
Tavi Gevinson				Cora		Feather McCarthy																					2
Dean Geyer			Brody Weston						Zane Williams																		2
Jessalyn Gilsig		Gina Russo	Terri Schuester																								2
Cuba Gooding Jr.				Dominic Banks			O. J. Simpson																				2
Raven Goodwin			Sheila																	Merritt Tryon							2
Hazel Graye																Heather Billings								Juliana Williams			2
Ari Graynor																	Leslie Abramson							Dr. Diana Starling			2
Max Greenfield				Gabriel			Ronnie Holston									Bryce Taylor											2
Nico Greetham			Vocal Adrenaline	Cal Cambon												Zinn Paul Winowski											3
Leslie Grossman	Mary Cherry	Bliss Berger		Meadow Wilton Patricia Krenwinkel Coco St. Pierre Vanderbilt Margaret Booth Ursula Khan Calico Barbara Read Ashleigh	Melissa												Judalon Smyth										5
Naomi Grossman				Pepper Samantha Crowe												Rabid Ruth											2
Grace Gummer				Mille Bishop Penny Nelson Margaret Alcott																			Grace Henry		Caroline Kennedy		3
Rebecca Hall																	Abby Borden							Jordan Bennett			2
Emma Halleen																Shelby Brubaker	Suzette (Note: Appeared on Monster: The Ed Gein Story.)							Bella Grant			3
Melinda Page Hamilton		Colleen Eubanks																			Danielle Bankman						2
Jason Butler Harner													Det. Les Zoeller										Sebastian				2
Laura Harrier													Camille Washington								Vivian Montgomery						2
Harriet Sansom Harris				Madelyn Lurch									Eleanor Roosevelt	Ingrid Blix													3
Neil Patrick Harris			Bryan Ryan	Chester Creb																							2
Colton Haynes				Det. Jack Samuels		Tyler																					2
Jeff Hiller				Mr. Gideon Whitely												Mr. Elijah Nevins Niles Taylor		The Therapist									3
Jan Hoag		Margot	Roberta			Agatha Bean																					3
Jackie Hoffman					Frances Bartholomew			Mamacita			Sherry Dougal																3
Tom Hollander								Truman Capote									Alfred Hitchcock										2
Lindsay Hollister	Big Bertha Muffin	Nanette Babcock																									2
Cheyenne Jackson			Dustin Goolsby	Will Drake Sidney Aaron James Dr. Vincent Anderson John Henry Moore																	Brian						3
Dominique Jackson										Elektra Evangelista						Bloody Mary											2
Paris Jackson																Maya					Vanessa						2
Bryce Johnson	Josh Ford	Corporal Oliver Brandt	Cody Tolentino	Neil Armstrong																							4
Dot-Marie Jones		Tess	Sheldon Beiste	Butchy May Trooper Jan Remy								Patty														Jan 'Butch' Banxxx	5
Kim Kardashian				Siobhan Corbyn																			Allura Grant				2
Paul Anthony Kelly				Young Nas																					John F. Kennedy Jr.		2
Richard Kind			Mr. Rifkin															Mitch				Caroll Mintz					3
Michelle Krusiec	Exquisite Woo												Anna May Wong														2
Briana Lane				Jess Dr. Richards	Clea				Storm			Pastor Nicole															4
Nathan Lane							F. Lee Bailey										Dominick Dunne					Bunny Schneiderman					3
Jessica Lange				Constance Langdon Sister Jude Martin Fiona Goode Elsa Mars				Joan Crawford Lillie Mae Faulk			Dusty Jackson																3
NeNe Leakes			Roz Washington		Rocky Rhoades																						2
Judith Light							Marilyn Miglin Susan Carpenter-McMillan				Dede Standish					Virginia Mellon							Sheila Baskin				4
Mario Lopez	Pablo	Dr. Mike Hamoui																									2
Billie Lourd				Winter Anderson Linda Kasabian Mallory Montana Duke Dr. Leslie "Lark" Feldman Dr. Hannah Wells Ashley		Chanel #3										Liv Whitley	Emma Borden					Becca Frank					5
Patti LuPone			Herself	Joan Ramsey Kathy Pizzaz						Frederica Norman			Avis Amberg														4
Jane Lynch	Suzi Klein		Sue Sylvester																								2
John Carroll Lynch				Twisty the Clown John Wayne Gacy Benjamin Richter												Larry Bitterman								Meyer Williams			3
Joe Mantello				Gino Barelli				Jack Dunphy					Dick Samuels					John Graff									4
Lesley Manville																	Bernice Worden			Cherry Redd							2
Kate Mara		Vanessa Bartholomew		Hayden McClaine						Patty Bowes																	3
Ricky Martin			David Martinez				Antonio D'Amico																				2
Margo Martindale							Lucianne Goldberg											Mo			Ellen Parsons						3
Dylan McDermott				Dr. Ben Harmon Johnny Morgan Bruce							Theo Klein		Ernie West			Dr. Ben Harmon											4
Neal McDonough				Dwight D. Eisenhower								Sergeant Ty O'Brien															2
Kevin McHale			Artie Abrams													Barry											2
Charles Melton			Model	Danny Wu												Wyatt											3
Lea Michele			Rachel Berry			Hester Ulrich																					2
Debra Monk			Mrs. Schuester	Virginia Harding																							2
James Morosini				Bob Kinnaman R.J.				Bart																			2
Matthew Morrison			Will Schuester	Trevor Kirchner																							2
Niecy Nash-Betts	Ms. Wilson					Denise Hempfield											Glenda Cleveland			Det. Lois Tryon			Emerald Green				5
Michael Nouri							Norman Blachford											Roger Kaplan					Arch Strickland				3
Denis O'Hare				Larry Harvey Otis Spalding Van Wirt Stanley Liz Taylor William van Henderson Holden Vaughn Dr. Andrew Hill												Samuel Van Wirt											2
Mike O'Malley			Burt Hummel																		Dr. Rodney Prescott						2
Cheri Oteri					Carla	Sheila Baumgartner																Denise Buckley					3
Chord Overstreet			Sam Evans																		Syphilis Sam						2
Hudson Oz								Jimmy Woodward								Liam	Henry Gein			Dr. Joseph Ritter	Eric Colby						5
Gwyneth Paltrow			Holly Holliday		Abby						Georgina Hobart					Daphne											4
Sarah Paulson		Agatha Ripp		Billie Dean Howard Lana Winters Cordelia Goode Bette and Dot Tattler Sally McKenna Audrey Tindall Ally Mayfair-Richards Susan Atkins Ms. Wilhelmina Venable Tuberculosis Karen Mamie Eisenhower			Marcia Clark Linda Tripp	Geraldine Page						Nurse Ratched			Aileen Wuornos						Carrington Lane				7
Evan Peters				Tate Langdon Kit Walker Kyle Spencer Jimmy Darling James Patrick March Rory Monahan Kai Anderson Malcolm Gallant Jeff Pfister Austin Sommers						Stan Bowes							Jeffrey Dahmer							Cooper Madsen			4
Geoff Pierson	James Ford								Lewis Kern																		2
David Pittu								Norman							Joe Eula	Aaron								Ronan Wylde			4
Mary Kay Place					Colleen Collins							Theresa Blake															2
Ben Platt											Payton Hobart													Manny			2
Joey Pollari				Ben DeSoto													Anthony Perkins							New Mike McGuinn			3
Jeremy Pope										Christopher			Archie Coleman											New Jeremy			3
Adina Porter			Mrs. Delaney	Sally Freeman Lee Harris Beverly Hope Dinah Stevens Chief Burleson																							2
Billy Porter				Behold Chablis						Pray Tell																	2
Isaac Powell				Troy Lord Theo Graves																				New Manny			2
Lily Rabe		Lanie Ainge		Nora Montgomery Sister Mary Eunice McKee Misty Day Aileen Wuornos Shelby Miller Lavinina Richter Doris Gardner Amelia Earhart																							2
Anthony Ramos																								The Assassin		Tony Cruz	2
Andrew Rannells			Himself		Bryan Collins																						2
Molly Ringwald								Joanne Carson									Shari Dahmer										2
Emma Roberts				Madison Montgomery Maggie Esmerelda Serena Belinda Brooke Thompson Anna Victoria Alcott		Chanel Oberlin																					2
Michaela Jaé Rodriguez				Nicolette Smith						Blanca Rodriguez																	2
Romy Rosemont		Libby Zucker	Carole Hudson-Hummel				Jill Shively		Lola Peterson																		4
Angelica Ross				Dr. Donna Chambers The Chemist Theta						Candy Ferocity																	2
Ronen Rubinstein												Tyler Kennedy "TK" Strand				Matt Webb											2
Skyler Samuels				Bonnie Lipton		Grace Gardner																					2
Brandon Santana									Pavel								Tony Tessa										2
Julia Schlaepfer											Alice Charles					Celeste											2
Riley Schmidt				Rubber Man Orderly		Red Devil Zak the Pizza Guy Green Meanie			Harrison Meeks																		3
Patrick Schwarzenegger						Thad Radwell													Tim Tebow								2
Teddy Sears				Patrick			James A. Fisher				William Ward					Jeffrey Webber											4
Chloë Sevigny				Shelley Dr. Alex Lowe				C. Z. Guest									Kitty Menendez										3
Brooke Shields		Faith Wolper				Dr. Scarlett Lovin			Dr. Kara Sanford														Juliana Morse				4
Gabourey Sidibe				Queenie Regina Ross												Jaslyn Taylor											2
Brooke Smith				Dr. Gardner																Det. Gale Hanover							2
Alisha Soper				Marilyn Monroe				Marilyn Monroe																			3
Mira Sorvino							Marcia Lewis						Jeanne Crandall														2
Rick Springfield				Pastor Charles Gibbs																			Tommy Keith				2
June Squibb			Maggie Banks													Grams Doherty											2
John Stamos			Carl Howell		Brice	Dr. Brock Holt															Craig Massey						4
Dijon Talton			Matt Rutherford				Officer Chambers																				2
Barbara Tarbuck		Mrs. Declan	Nancy Bletheim	Mother Superior Claudia																							3
Russell Tovey				Det. Patrick Read				John O'Shea																			2
Anthony Turpel									Freddie Costas								Donovan Goodreau				Connor						3
Sophie von Haselberg				Mary I of England				Linda Elwell			Syd				Renee										Tanya		5
Malcolm-Jamal Warner				Angus T. Jefferson			Al Cowlings		Amir Casey																		3
Michael Benjamin Washington			Tracy Pendergrass											Trevor Briggs													2
Naomi Watts								Babe Paley										Nora Brannock					Liberty Ronson		Jacqueline Kennedy Onassis		4
Robin Weigert				Cynthia Potter Mama Polk Martha Edwards							Andi Mueller						Enid Watkins										3
Rumer Willis									Georgia												Josie						2
Finn Wittrock				Dandy Mott Tristan Duffy Rudolph Valentino Jether Polk Bobby Richter II Harry Gardner			Jeffery Trail							Edmund Tolleson													3
Alison Wright								Pauline Jameson Pamela Harriman					Ms. Roswell														2
Rob Yang																Dr. Thaddeus Lau								Dr. Ray Lee			2
Constance Zimmer																									Ann Messina Freeman	Abigail Mallory	2
