= This Is How =

2018 book by Augusten Burroughs

- Author: Augusten Burroughs
- Language: English
- Genre: Self-help book
- Published: May 8, 2012 (St. Martin's Press)
- Publication place: United States
- Media type: Print (hardcover and paperback), digital
- Pages: 230
- ISBN: 9780312563554
- Preceded by: You Better Not Cry: Stories for Christmas
- Followed by: Lust & Wonder: A Memoir

This Is How: Proven Aid in Overcoming Shyness, Molestation, Fatness, Spinsterhood, Grief, Disease, Lushery, Decrepitude & More for Young and Old Alike is the eighth book by Augusten Burroughs. It was released on May 8, 2012.

== Synopsis ==
According to the publisher's synopsis, the book "explores how to survive the 'un-survivable'" in a different way from most self-help books.

Burroughs has said that the question he is asked more often than any other is how he survived certain experiences in his life. Burroughs wrote the book as a response to those questions. Burroughs says the book is about crises, how a person must be "absolutely brutally honest" with oneself. Burroughs discusses his own experiences and how he survived them and kept moving forward.

Burroughs says he does not believe in powerlessness or self-pity. Burroughs urges people not to wait for someone else to make amends or someone else to help; rather, a person must take responsibility and have a strong understanding that everyone is the author of their own life. Burroughs advocates breaking the "addiction" of dwelling on one's past by focusing on the present and staying busy with physical activities.

Burroughs hates the myth that anyone can achieve a dream with hard work and perseverance. He says that without talent and without breaks, it is simply not possible to achieve one's dreams. Instead, a person must avoid self-delusion and concentrate on realistic ambitions.

== Reception ==
The Globe and Mail's Rosemary Counter describes the book as "equal parts self-help and anti-self-help, with a dash of memoir." Counter calls the writing "vague to the point of frustration" and "teeters between snark and sap." The portions of the book that are memoir-writing, however, are excellent, according to Counter.

Michael Sims of The Washington Post said that Burroughs' writing simply borrows pedantic truisms that have been said before in many other self-help books. Sims criticizes Burroughs for padding the book with one- or two-word paragraphs, pointing out ridiculously obvious facts such as 800-numbers being toll-free, and writing out a phone number in words rather than in numerals.

Richard Marcus of BlogCritics.org said, "No one book will instantly make your life better, and neither will This Is How. However, it will point you in the right direction so you can begin whatever journey you feel you need to take. Which makes it worth its weight in gold."

In Andrew Cattanach's review on Booktopia, he said, "If you never thought you'd buy a self-help book rest assured this isn't one. However it's without a doubt more effective than any out there. ... Burroughs' treatment of edgy subjects are excellent, his wit and wisdom the implements with which to open your mind to new ways of thinking and living."

Sophie Quick of the Weekend Australian said the book is best when Burroughs gets specific with his advice, but the book is lacking when Burroughs gives overly general and simplistic advice that reads as "comically uninspired" platitudes.
