= Do Whatever Turns You On =

Studio album by Aberfeldy
- Released: 3 July 2006
- Genre: Indie pop
- Length: 41:40
- Label: Rough Trade
- Producer: Calum Malcolm

Aberfeldy chronology
Young Forever (2004)	Do Whatever Turns You On (2006)	Somewhere To Jump From (2010)

Professional ratings
Review scores
Source	Rating
AllMusic	4/5 stars

Do Whatever Turns You On is the second album from Scottish indie band Aberfeldy. The album was released in July 2006, two years after the band's first album Young Forever.

== Track listing ==
1. "Someone Like You"
2. "Hypnotised"
3. "There You Go"
4. "Up Tight"
5. "All True Trendies"
6. "Poetry"
7. "1970s"
8. "Never Give Up"
9. "Need to Know"
10. "Whatever Turns You On"
11. "Let Down"
12. "Turn Me Towards the Light"
