= Lust & Wonder =

2016 memoir by Augusten Burroughs

Lust & Wonder: A Memoir
- Author: Augusten Burroughs
- Language: English
- Genre: Memoir
- Published: March 29, 2016; St. Martin's Press
- Publication place: United States
- Pages: 304
- ISBN: 978-0-312-34203-6 (Hardcover)
- Preceded by: This Is How: Proven Aid in Overcoming Shyness, Molestation, Fatness, Spinsterhood, Grief, Disease, Lushery, Decrepitude & More for Young and Old Alike

Lust & Wonder: A Memoir is the ninth book by Augusten Burroughs. It was released on March 29, 2016.

== Synopsis ==
According to the editor, the book is a memoir "about a man searching for what brings his heart home."

== Reception ==
Lust & Wonder: A Memoir was ranked third for combined print and e-Book nonfiction on The New York Times Best Seller list on April 17, 2016.

The New York Times said that Burroughs is talented at simultaneously blaming everyone else for his troubles while maintaining an undercurrent of self-awareness that it is actually all his own fault. It said that the book becomes much less entertaining once Burroughs finds peace.

The Washington Post said the book added little new to the other memoirs previously written by Burroughs, best for readers who care deeply about the Burroughs and not for readers whose feelings for Burroughs are not strongly positive.

The Albany Times-Union described the book as a "valentine to his husband".

Fort Myers Florida Weekly called the book just as funny and sharp as Burroughs' previous memoirs, albeit without much originality.

The Winston-Salem Journal said that seeing Burroughs "grow and gain the courage to make better choices is a moving experience."

The Greenfield Recorder said that the book repeated a lot from Burroughs' books, without adding much of the hilarity that usually makes his books enjoyable.

The Concord Monitor said that the book added little insight to Burroughs' previous memoirs, speculating that Burroughs continues to write memoirs for his own amusement rather than for that of his readers.
