= A Wolf at the Table =

2008 memoir by Augusten Burroughs

- Author: Augusten Burroughs
- Cover artist: Chip Kidd
- Language: English
- Publisher: St. Martin's Press
- Publication date: April 29, 2008
- Publication place: United States
- Media type: Print (hardcover and paperback)
- Pages: 256
- ISBN: 0-312-34202-0
- OCLC: 191763295
- Dewey Decimal: 813/.6 B 22
- LC Class: PS3552.U745 Z48 2008
- Preceded by: Possible Side Effects
- Followed by: You Better Not Cry: Stories for Christmas

A Wolf at the Table is a 2008 memoir by Augusten Burroughs that recounts his turbulent childhood relationship with his father. In the summer of 2007, Burroughs announced on his official website that the book would be released on April 29, 2008. In an interview with Wikinews, Burroughs said that many of his fans may have trouble with the book. A Wolf at the Table spent six weeks on The New York Times Best Seller list, reaching number 2 in its first week. It also reached number 9 on The Wall Street Journal's best seller list.

Tegan Quin of the duo Tegan and Sara wrote a song titled "His Love," which was performed at various book openings and occasionally at the Quin twin's concerts.
