= Augusten Burroughs =

American writer (born 1965)

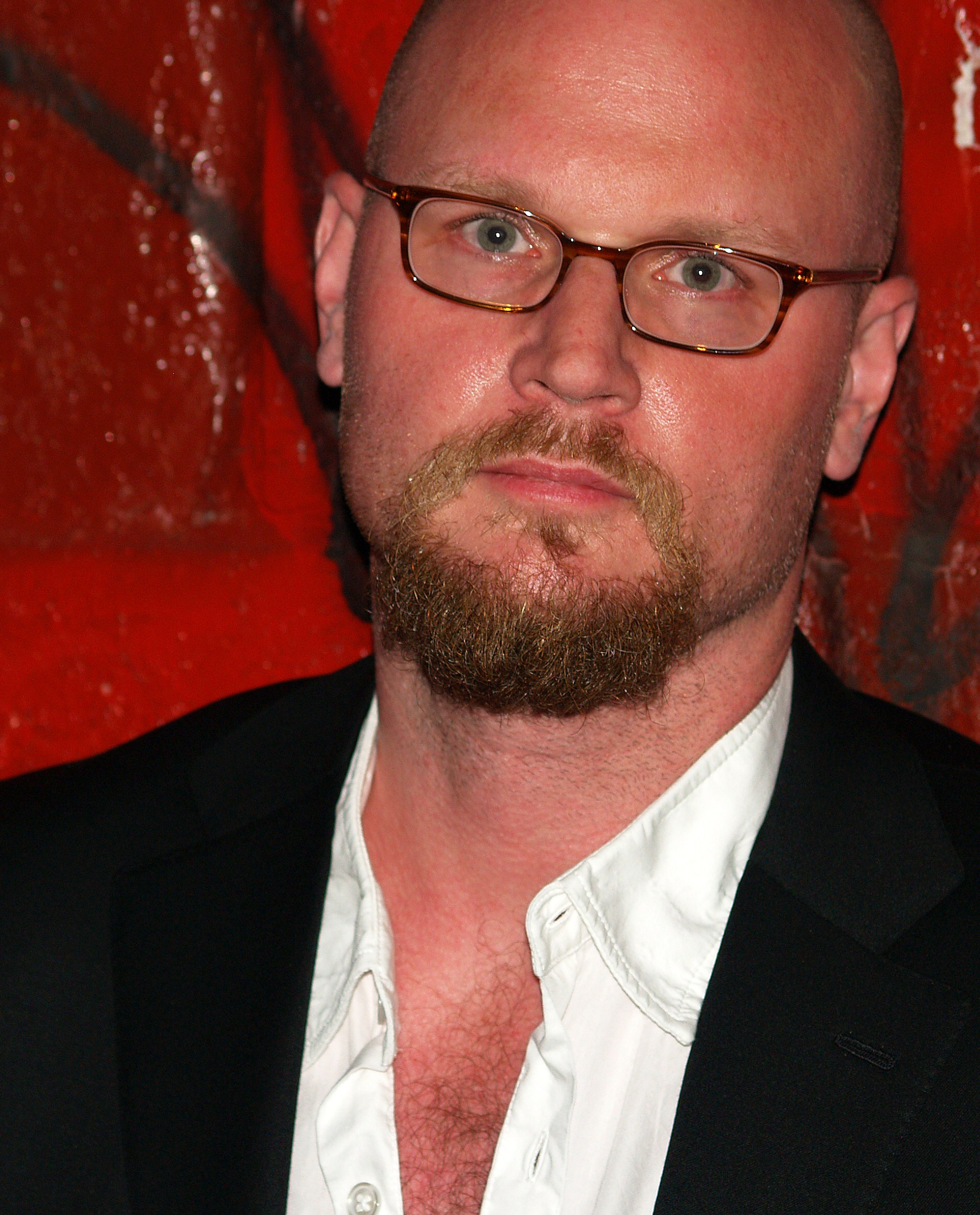
- Burroughs in New York City, 2007
- Born: Christopher Richter Robison; October 23, 1965 (age 61); Pittsburgh, Pennsylvania, U.S.
- Occupations: Screenwriter; memoirist; essayist
- Spouse: Christopher Schelling (m. 2013)
- Relatives: John Elder Robison (brother)
- Writing career
- Period: 2000–present
- Subjects: Memoir, humor
- Notable works: Running with Scissors (2002), A Wolf at the Table (2008)
- Website: www.augusten.com

Augusten Xon Burroughs (born Christopher Richter Robison, October 23, 1965) is an American writer best known for his New York Times bestselling memoir Running with Scissors (2002).

== Early life ==
Christopher Richter Robison was born in Pittsburgh, Pennsylvania, the younger of two sons of poet Margaret Robison and John G. Robison, former head of the philosophy department at the University of Massachusetts Amherst.

He is eight years younger than his brother, fellow memoirist John Elder Robison. He was raised in various towns in Massachusetts, including Shutesbury, Amherst, and Northampton. His older brother had already escaped the unstable home before their parents divorced on July 29, 1978. His mother then sent the 12-year-old Christopher to live with the family of her psychiatrist, Dr. Rodolph Harvey Turcotte, whose ever-changing collection of children, adopted children and patients lived in a large ramshackle property in Northampton.

Robison's mother assigned legal guardianship to Turcotte, who believed that children became adults at 13. A few months after Robison moved in, Turcotte allowed him to drop out of sixth grade.

== Education and writing career ==
Robison obtained a GED at age 17. At age 18, living on his own in Boston, he legally changed his name to Augusten Xon Burroughs. He later enrolled at Holyoke Community College in Holyoke, Massachusetts, as a pre-med student, dropping out before the end of the first semester. He decided to settle in New York City and worked for a Manhattan-based advertising company. In 1996, he sought treatment for alcoholism at a rehabilitation center in Minnesota before returning to Manhattan.

Some of Burroughs' childhood experiences were chronicled in his successful first memoir, Running with Scissors (2002), which was later made into a film by the same name.

Augusten Burroughs discusses his road to writing, sobriety and the Turcottes over dinner in the East Village.

In addition to Scissors, Burroughs penned a second memoir, Dry (2003), about his experience during and after treatment for alcoholism. It was followed by two collections of memoir essays, Magical Thinking (2003) and Possible Side Effects (2006). His first novel, Sellevision, was published in 2000.

Burroughs' writing focuses on subjects such as advertising, psychiatrists, religious families, and home shopping networks. It has appeared in publications such as The New York Times, House & Garden, BlackBook, New York, The Times, Bark, Attitude, and Out. Burroughs writes a monthly column for Details. Early in his career, he was a regular commentator on National Public Radio's Morning Edition.

In 2005, Universal Studios and Red Wagon Productions bought the rights to a film based on a then-unreleased memoir about Burroughs' relationship with his father. The book, called A Wolf at the Table, was released on April 29, 2008.

In October 2009, Burroughs released You Better Not Cry: Stories for Christmas, a book of short Christmas stories based on true events that occurred during his childhood.

In 2012, Burroughs released This Is How, a book of advice and memoirs.

In 2016, Burroughs released Lust & Wonder: A Memoir, a memoir about his life after rehab, and his relationships prior to and leading to his husband, Schelling.

Burroughs released Toil & Trouble: A Memoir, in October 2019. The work details his experience coming out as "a witch" and moving from his apartment in New York City into a mansion in Connecticut with his husband.

The above books were published by St. Martin's Press and Picador.

He published a children's book in 2023, My Little Thief, which was illustrated by Bonnie Lui and published by Christy Ottaviano Books.

== Personal life ==
In a January 2005 interview, reflecting on his life with his then partner, graphic designer Dennis Pilsits, Burroughs said paying tax should allow same-sex couples full legal entitlements:

That's what gay people need to be allowed to do – get married. Not have domestic partnerships; that's not acceptable. I don't believe for a moment [gay marriage] would destroy the sanctity of marriage. But let's just say for a moment that it does. Well, then the sanctity of marriage just has to be destroyed. It's just too bad. You can't have one set of benefits and only give them to some of the people.

Burroughs divides time between New York City and Amherst, Massachusetts. On April 1, 2013, Burroughs married his longtime agent and companion Christopher Schelling at the Staten Island Borough Hall of New York City.

Burroughs has been profiled in People, The Guardian, and Entertainment Weekly, where he ranked 15 on the 2005 list of "The 25 Funniest People in America" and was named to the magazine's "It List".

Burroughs was presented with a special Trustee Award at the Lambda Literary Awards in 2013.

In 2024, Burroughs, Schelling, and their friend Shari Sirkin opened The Shiny Black Door, a store in Northampton offering unique items such as rare manuscripts, fine jewelry, and works from renowned artists and photographers.

== Lawsuit over Running with Scissors ==
The family of Dr. Turcotte (who died in 2000), Burroughs' legal guardian when he was a child, were concerned about the depiction of the Finch family in Running with Scissors. In August 2007, Burroughs and his publisher, St. Martin's Press, settled with the Turcotte family, who stated that their presentation as the Finch family was largely fictional and written in a sensational manner. The Turcottes originally sought damages of $2 million for invasion of privacy, defamation, and intentional infliction of emotional distress. Burroughs defended his work as "entirely accurate," but agreed to call the work a "book" (instead of "memoir") in the author's note, to alter the acknowledgments page in future editions to recognize the Turcotte family's conflicting memories of described events, and express regret for "any unintentional harm" to the Turcotte family.

In August 2007, when the suit was settled, Burroughs stated:

I consider this not only a personal victory but a victory for all memoirists. I still maintain that the book is an entirely accurate memoir, and that it was not fictionalized or sensationalized in any way. I did not embellish or invent elements. We had a very strong case because I had the truth on my side.

In October 2007, Burroughs further stated that he felt vindicated by the settlement:

I'm not at all sorry that I wrote it. And you know, the suit settled – it settled in my favor. I didn't change a word of the memoir, not one word of it. It's still a memoir, it's marketed as a memoir, [the Turcottes] agreed one hundred percent that it is a memoir.

== Film and television ==
Running with Scissors was made into a 2006 film. It was directed by Ryan Murphy, produced by Brad Pitt, and starred Joseph Cross, Brian Cox, Annette Bening, Alec Baldwin, Gwyneth Paltrow, and Evan Rachel Wood. Bening was nominated for a Golden Globe for her role.

== Bibliography ==
- 2000: Sellevision (ISBN 0-312-26772-X) (fiction)
- 2002: Running with Scissors (ISBN 0-312-28370-9)
- 2003: Dry (ISBN 0-312-42379-9)
- 2004: Magical Thinking (ISBN 0-312-31594-5)
- 2006: Possible Side Effects (ISBN 0-312-31596-1)
- 2008: A Wolf at the Table (ISBN 0-312-42827-8)
- 2009: You Better Not Cry (ISBN 0-312-34191-1)
- 2011: Take Five: Four Favorite Essays Plus One Never-Been-Seen Essay (ISBN 1-429-95854-5)
- 2012: This Is How. (ISBN 9780312563554)
- 2016: Lust & Wonder (ISBN 9780312342036)
- 2019: Toil & Trouble: A Memoir (ISBN 9781250019950)
- 2023: My Little Thief (ISBN 9780316374132)

=== Contributions ===
- 2007: Look Me in the Eye: My Life with Asperger's by John Elder Robison (ISBN 0-7393-5768-9) (foreword)

== See also ==
- LGBT culture in New York City
- List of LGBT people from New York City
- Literary analysis
