= Running with Scissors (film) =

2006 film by Ryan Murphy

- Theatrical release poster
- Directed by: Ryan Murphy
- Screenplay by: Ryan Murphy
- Based on: Running with Scissors by Augusten Burroughs
- Produced by: Ryan Murphy; Brad Pitt; Brad Grey; Dede Gardner
- Starring: Annette Bening; Brian Cox; Joseph Fiennes; Evan Rachel Wood; Alec Baldwin; Jill Clayburgh; Joseph Cross; Gwyneth Paltrow
- Cinematography: Christopher Baffa
- Edited by: Byron Smith, ACE
- Music by: James S. Levine
- Production companies: TriStar Pictures; Plan B Entertainment
- Distributed by: Sony Pictures Releasing
- Release date: October 27, 2006
- Running time: 116 minutes
- Country: United States
- Language: English
- Box office: $7 million

Running with Scissors is a 2006 American comedy drama film written and directed by Ryan Murphy, based on Augusten Burroughs' 2002 memoir of the same name, and starring Joseph Cross, Annette Bening, Brian Cox, Joseph Fiennes, Evan Rachel Wood, Alec Baldwin, Jill Clayburgh and Gwyneth Paltrow. The semi-autobiographical account of Burroughs' childhood (when his real name was still Christopher Robison), based on his best-selling book, received mixed reviews as a film.

== Plot ==
Augusten Burroughs' mother, Deirdre, who wishes to become a famous poet, has severe mood swings and erratic behavior. Augusten's alcoholic father, Norman, proves to be of no help. By the time he is a teenager, Norman has moved out and Deirdre sends Augusten to live with her psychiatrist, Dr. Finch, who becomes his legal guardian. Dr. Finch is the eccentric patriarch of an oddball family, which consists of his submissive wife Agnes, religious older daughter Hope, and his rebellious younger daughter Natalie, who is slightly older than Augusten.

Augusten finds it hard to adjust to living with the Finches and the irregular weekend visits home with his increasingly unsound mother. After confessing to Natalie that he is gay, Augusten befriends Neil Bookman, Finch's patient and adopted 33-year-old son. The two begin an erratic sexual relationship quickly after meeting; Augusten is 14 at the time.

Consistent with a confidence game seen with the family of Neil—and with a 41-year-old patient who abused Natalie, and with young adult patient Dorothy Ambrose—Dr. Finch manipulates Deirdre into signing over her child support money to him. By the time of Augusten's 15th birthday, Deirdre has established a relationship with her living companion Dorothy ("I've always wanted a daughter"), leaving Augusten feeling like his mother no longer wants him, while also dealing with the negative effects of Neil's schizophrenia and Dorothy's animosity.

A few years later, the still-teenaged Augusten leaves for New York to become a writer. He says goodbye to his mother and goes to the bus station. Agnes, with whom he has developed a caring relationship, arrives and gives him the money she has saved.

In a mid-credits vignette, it is shown that Dr. Finch lost his license due to insurance fraud and died in 2000, Agnes went to work in a nursing home, Natalie earned a degree in psychology, Hope worked with her dad until his death, Norman re-established contact with Augusten before he died in 2005, Deirdre remains estranged from her son, Neil was never heard from again, and Augusten (the real Augusten, seen onscreen sitting beside the actor playing Augusten) wrote a book.

== Cast ==
- Joseph Cross as Augusten Burroughs
  - Jack Kaeding as 6-year-old Augusten
- Annette Bening as Deirdre Burroughs
- Brian Cox as Dr. Marion Finch
- Joseph Fiennes as Neil Bookman
- Evan Rachel Wood as Natalie Finch
- Alec Baldwin as Norman Burroughs
- Jill Clayburgh as Agnes Finch
- Gwyneth Paltrow as Hope Finch
- Gabrielle Union as Dorothy Ambrose
- Kristin Chenoweth as Fern Stewart
- Patrick Wilson as Michael Shephard
- Colleen Camp as Joan
- Dagmara Dominczyk as Suzanne
- Augusten Burroughs (uncredited) as himself

== Reception ==
=== Critical response ===
On Rotten Tomatoes, the film holds a 32% approval rating, based on 135 reviews, with an average score of 5/10. The site's consensus states: "Despite a few great performances, the film lacks the sincerity and emotional edge of Burroughs' well-loved memoir." The review aggregator website Metacritic gave Running with Scissors a score of 52 out of 100, based on 32 critics, indicating "mixed or average reviews". Audiences polled by CinemaScore gave the film an average grade of "C+" on an A+ to F scale.

=== Accolades ===
Award	Category	Recipients and nominees	Result	Ref.
Boston Society of Film Critics	Best Supporting Actor	Alec Baldwin	2nd place	
Critics' Choice Movie Awards	Best Young Performer	Joseph Cross	Nominated	
GLAAD Media Award	Outstanding Film – Wide Release		Nominated	
Golden Globe Award	Best Actress in a Motion Picture - Musical or Comedy	Annette Bening	Nominated	
Hollywood Film Awards	Breakthrough Directing	Ryan Murphy	Won	
Satellite Award	Best Actor – Motion Picture Musical or Comedy	Joseph Cross	Won	
Satellite Award	Best Actress – Motion Picture Musical or Comedy	Annette Bening	Nominated	
St. Louis Gateway Film Critics Association	Best Actress	Annette Bening	Won	
St. Louis Gateway Film Critics Association	Best Supporting Actress	Jill Clayburgh	Nominated	
St. Louis Gateway Film Critics Association	Best Overlooked Film		Won	

== Soundtrack ==
The soundtrack for the film was released on September 26, 2006, a month prior to the film's release.

1. "Pick Up the Pieces" – Average White Band
2. "Blinded by the Light" – Manfred Mann's Earth Band
3. "The Things We Do for Love" – 10cc
4. "Mr. Blue" – Catherine Feeny
5. "One Less Bell to Answer" – The 5th Dimension
6. "Quizás, Quizás, Quizás" (Perhaps, Perhaps, Perhaps) – Nat King Cole
7. "Poetry Man" – Phoebe Snow
8. "Bennie and the Jets" – Elton John
9. "Year of the Cat" – Al Stewart
10. "O Tannenbaum" – Vince Guaraldi Trio
11. "A Great Ocean Liner" – James S. Levine
12. "Stardust" – Nat King Cole
13. "Teach Your Children" – Crosby, Stills, Nash & Young

An adaptation of Telepopmusik's "Another Day" was also an underlying theme that recurred several times throughout the film. "Waltz for Debby", "Very Early", and "Re: Person I Knew", by Bill Evans are used in the film as well. The song playing in the "Stew" scene is "d-moll" by the duo Tosca from their album Delhi 9; this theme is repeated throughout the film.

== See also ==
- List of lesbian, gay, bisexual, or transgender-related films by storyline
