= Young Forever (Aberfeldy album) =

Studio album by Aberfeldy
- Released: August 2004
- Recorded: 2003–2004
- Studio: Kinky Studio, Edinburgh
- Genre: Indie pop
- Length: 37:56
- Label: Rough Trade
- Producer: Jim Sutherland

Aberfeldy chronology
| Young Forever (2004) | Do Whatever Turns You On (2006) |

Professional ratings
Review scores
| Source | Rating |
|---|---|
| AllMusic | 4.5/5 stars |
| NME | 9/10 |
| Pitchfork | 3.4/10 |

Young Forever is the debut album from Scottish indie band Aberfeldy. Released in August 2004, it was recorded in 2003-2004 in mono using one microphone and produced by Jim Sutherland. The album achieved favourable reviews including NME, AllMusic and IndieLondon.

Two singles from the album made the UK singles chart: "Heliopolis by Night" reached number 66 in 2004 and "Love Is an Arrow" reached number 60 in 2005. Two other singles were released on 7" single only: "Vegetarian Restaurant" and "Summer's Gone".

== Track listing ==
1. "A Friend Like You"
2. "Slow Me Down"
3. "Love Is an Arrow"
4. "Tie One On"
5. "Summer's Gone"
6. "Vegetarian Restaurant"
7. "What You Do"
8. "Young Forever"
9. "Surly Girl"
10. "Heliopolis by Night"
11. "Something I Must Tell You"
12. "Out of Love"

=== Bonus tracks on Australian release ===
13. "Jennifer" (B-side of "Heliopolis by Night" 7" single)
14. "Take It Away" (B-side of "Heliopolis by Night" CD single)
