= Switched On (book) =

Book by John Elder Robison

- Author: John Elder Robison
- Language: English
- Genre: Memoir
- Publisher: Spiegel & Grau
- Publication date: March 22, 2016
- Publication place: United States
- Media type: Print, ebook
- Pages: 320 pp.
- ISBN: 978-0-8129-9689-0 (Hardcover)

Switched On: A Memoir of Brain Change and Emotional Awakening is a work of nonfiction by John Elder Robison, chronicling the author's participation in a Transcranial Magnetic Stimulation study along with its after effects.

== Story ==
Published in 2016 by Spiegel & Grau, Switched On describes Robison's participation in a 2008 Transcranial Magnetic Stimulation study under Alvaro Pascual-Leone at Harvard University. He claimed that TMS put his brain into a meditative state. Robison wrote that he felt more emotionally attuned to his environment and had an easier time reading people's emotions. However, the effects eventually faded. Additionally, the treatment led to him feeling more sensitive to his wife's depression and to an eventual divorce.
