= You Better Not Cry =

2009 book by Augusten Burroughs

- Author: Augusten Burroughs
- Language: English
- Published: 2009 (St. Martin's Press)
- Publication place: United States
- Media type: Print (hardcover and paperback)
- Pages: 224
- ISBN: 0-312-34191-1
- OCLC: 317928637
- Preceded by: A Wolf at the Table

You Better Not Cry: Stories for Christmas is the sixth memoir by Augusten Burroughs. It was released on October 27, 2009.

== Synopsis ==
The book is a collection of autobiographical holiday stories recounted by the author.

== Stories ==
You Better Not Cry contains the following stories.

1. You Better Not Cry
2. And Two Eyes Made Out of Coal
3. Claus and Effect
4. Ask Again Later
5. Why Do You Reward Me Thus?
6. The Best and Only Everything
7. Silent Night

== Reception ==
Publishers Weekly wrote:

"Burroughs's holiday-themed memoir lacks the consistent emotional intensity of his earlier work, despite a few gems. Arranged roughly chronologically, the vignettes begin with concrete Christmas memories (preparing a detailed, multipart list of desired presents in 'Claus and Effect') and move toward musings on the spirit of the holiday (facing a flooded house with an atheist partner in 'Silent Night'). While the childhood stories have Burroughs's trademark dry wit—he once gnawed the face off a life-size Saint Nick made of wax—they aren't particularly memorable. It's when he turns his attention to the less tangible essence of the holiday that the writing comes alive, especially in the final two pieces, 'The Best and Only Everything' and 'Silent Night.' In the former, Burroughs (Running with Scissors) remembers a long-ago Christmas spent with a former lover dying of AIDS and in the latter, which takes place a decade later, he describes dealing not only with a burst water pipe but also feeling ready to celebrate the season with a tree for the first time since the death of his old boyfriend."
