= Aberfeldy (band) =

Scottish musical group

- Origin: Edinburgh, Scotland
- Genres: Indie pop, pop punk
- Years active: 2002–2010
- Labels: Rough Trade Records, 17 Seconds Records
- Past members: Riley Briggs; Murray Briggs; Ken McIntosh; Kirsten Adamson; Chris Bradley; Ian Stoddart; Ruth Barrie; Sarah McFadyen; Bree Wright; Vicky Gray

Aberfeldy were a Scottish indie pop band founded in Edinburgh in 2002. Formed by the singer-songwriter Riley Briggs, the band is named after the Scottish town where Riley's grandfather had a caravan. Known for their melodic, folk-influenced pop sound, they gained attention with their debut album, Young Forever (2004), which featured the single "Heliopolis by Night".

They followed up with Do Whatever Turns You On (2006) and Somewhere to Jump From (2010), with a blend of acoustic instrumentation, harmonies, and lyricism.

Although Aberfeldy have been less active in recent years, they continue to perform sporadically.

== Formation ==
Singer/guitarist Riley Briggs formed Aberfeldy between 2002 and 2003, meeting the band in various locations in Edinburgh – Sarah and Ian through The Royal Oak bar, Ken through an advert for a punk band and Ruth through working as a barmaid in The Bongo Club. Riley's early songs, some of which were included on Young Forever, were written as a result of the breakup with his partner.

== Career ==
=== Recording ===
In 2003, Aberfeldy recorded fourteen songs with producer Jim Sutherland at his studio above Edinburgh's Bongo Club, using only one microphone and no overdubbing. The resulting tracks were licensed to Rough Trade Records and released in 2004 as the album Young Forever. The single "Heliopolis by Night" was NME's single of the week on release.

The follow-up single "Love Is an Arrow" was featured by Lorraine Kelly on GMTV's Kelly Plays Pop section. The record sold out in less than a week, due to not enough copies being pressed. The single reached no. 60 in the UK charts. The animated video, by Chris Waitt, was nominated for an MTVU Woodie award for best animated video, but lost out to the Gorillaz.

"Summer's Gone", from the Young Forever album, saw use in a range of commercials. It was used in Argentina to advertise Quilmes beer. It was used again for a Diet Coke commercial in the US and Canada, appearing initially during the 2007 Oscars and also during American Idol. In 2010, the song was featured in a commercial for Travelers Insurance.

Drummer Ian Stoddart (onetime member of Win) departed in late 2005, and was replaced by Murray Briggs, Riley's brother, formerly of the Anarcho/street punk band Oi Polloi.

A second album, Do Whatever Turns You On, produced by Calum Malcolm, was released by Rough Trade on 3 July 2006. However, in October 2006, Rough Trade announced that they no longer wished to work with the band, twelve weeks after the album's limited (UK & Australia only) release.

Ruth Barrie (keyboards, vocals) and Sarah McFadyen (violin, vocals) left Aberfeldy following the 2007 Tune Up Tour. Bree Wright (keyboards, vocals) joined for a short time, but did not stay with the band beyond a summer tour. Shortly afterwards Vicky Gray (violin, keyboards, vocals) and Chris Bradley (guitar, keyboards, vocals) joined the line-up.

The band completed 2007 with two shows at the Voodoo Rooms in Edinburgh.

Aberfeldy released a single in October 2008, "Come On, Claire" with 17 Seconds Records. This was followed with their third album, Somewhere to Jump From, which was released on 6 September 2010 through Tenement Records, preceded by single "Malcolm" on 16 August 2010.

=== Touring ===
As well as touring throughout the UK, Aberfeldy supported R.E.M. at their Loch Lomond gig, and Blondie and the Scissor Sisters at Edinburgh's Hogmanay celebrations (2004), and played at T in the Park (2005). They performed at the 2005 and 2006 South by Southwest Festival in Austin, Texas.

Aberfeldy toured the UK in May and June 2006. For part of that tour they supported The Beautiful South. During June and July 2006 the band supported James Blunt for four of his UK and European tour dates. The band also had festival dates and an extensive headline tour in autumn 2006, as well as supporting Paolo Nutini on his UK tour.

In October 2006, the band were played at the Cervantino festival in Guanajuato, Mexico; the concert was seen live by over 10,000 people and broadcast on radio and TV.

Aberfeldy toured Scotland in April and May 2007 part of the Scottish Arts Council's Tune-Up Tour. They also played several open-air gigs during the summer.

== Members ==
- Riley Briggs – lead vocals, guitar, keyboards
- Murray Briggs – drums
- Ken McIntosh – bass
- Kirsten Adamson – keyboards, vocals
- Chris Bradley – guitar, keyboards, vocals

== Discography ==
=== Albums ===
- Young Forever (2004)
- Do Whatever Turns You On (2006)
- Somewhere to Jump From (2010)

=== Singles ===
- "Vegetarian Restaurant" (2004)
- "Heliopolis By Night" (2004) – UK No. 66
- "Love Is an Arrow" (2005) – UK No. 60
- "Summer's Gone" (2005)
- "Hypnotised" (2006)
- "Come On, Claire" (2008)

=== Additional Appearances ===
- Woodland Casual (2015) by Dominic Waxing Lyrical
