= Magical Thinking (book) =

2004 memoir by Augusten Burroughs

- Author: Augusten Burroughs
- Language: English
- Genre: Memoir
- Publisher: St. Martin's Press
- Publication date: October 2004
- Publication place: United States
- Media type: Print
- Pages: 288 pp
- ISBN: 0-312-31594-5
- OCLC: 54974544
- Dewey Decimal: 813/.6 B 22
- LC Class: PS3552.U745 Z472 2004
- Preceded by: Dry
- Followed by: Possible Side Effects

Magical Thinking is a 2004 memoir by American writer Augusten Burroughs. The book contains stories from the adult life of the author.

== Stories ==
Magical Thinking contains the following stories:

1. Commercial Break
2. Vanderbilt Genes
3. Transfixed by Transsexuals
4. Model Behavior
5. I Dated an Undertaker
6. And Now a Word from Our Sponsor
7. The Rat/Thing
8. Debby's Requirements
9. Roof Work
10. Beating Raoul
11. Holy Blow Job
12. Mark the Shrink
13. Telemarketing Revenge
14. My Last First Date
15. The Schnauzer
16. Key Worst
17. Ass Burger
18. Life Cycle of the North American Opossum
19. Cunnilingusville
20. I Kid You Not
21. I'm Gonna Live Forever
22. Total Turnaround
23. Roid Rage
24. Magical Thinking
25. Puff Derby
26. Meanwhile, Back at the Ranch
27. Up the Escalator
