= Dry (memoir) =

2003 memoir by Augusten Burroughs

- Author: Augusten Burroughs
- Language: English
- Genre: Memoir
- Publisher: St. Martin's Press
- Publication date: June 2003
- Publication place: United States
- Pages: 293
- ISBN: 978-0312272050
- Dewey Decimal: 813/.6 B
- LC Class: PS3552.U745 Z465 2003

Dry is a memoir written by American writer Augusten Burroughs. It describes the author's battle with alcoholism. Dry was written before Running with Scissors, but was published second. Dry reached number 24 on The New York Times Best Seller list for Hardcover Nonfiction.

Although the memoir is based on actual events, the first pages include this author's note: "This memoir is based on my experiences over a ten-year period. Names have been changed, characters combined, and events compressed. Certain episodes are imaginative re-creation, and those episodes are not intended to portray actual events."

== Synopsis ==
The first part of the memoir centers on Burroughs' intervention by his co-workers and boss as well as his time spent at a rehab facility that caters specifically to gay and lesbian patients. The second part of the novel deals with Burroughs' first bout with sobriety since leaving the rehab program. He meets a love interest at his group therapy sessions and takes in a fellow addict in recovery. Part II also shows the decline in health in Burroughs' ex-boyfriend and current friend, only named Pighead in the memoir. Pighead is living with HIV, and although healthy in the beginning of the book, he eventually succumbs to the effects of HIV. The death of his friend sends Burroughs into a relapse, including drinking, cocaine and crack. The memoir ends with Burroughs getting clean and helping another alcoholic friend of his through his recovery.

== Characters ==
Augusten
Main character and author of the memoir.
Greer
Burroughs's co-worker and friend. Part of the intervention
Jim
Mortician. Burroughs's drinking buddy. Reappears in the end sober and in recovery as well.
Pighead
Burroughs's best friend and former love interest.
Foster
Burroughs's love interest in the memoir. They meet at group therapy for alcohol/drug addicts.
Hayden
Recovering addict who moves in with Burroughs midway through the memoir

== Film adaptation ==
Burroughs is writing the script for a Showtime series based on the memoir. No release date has been announced.

== See also ==
- Augusten Burroughs on addiction, writing, his family and his new book
