= Running with Scissors (memoir) =

2002 memoir by Augusten Burroughs

- Author: Augusten Burroughs
- Language: English
- Genre: Memoir
- Publisher: Picador
- Publication date: 2002
- Publication place: United States
- Pages: 302
- ISBN: 0-312-42227-X
- OCLC: 48515847
- Preceded by: Sellevision
- Followed by: Dry

Running with Scissors is a 2002 memoir by American writer Augusten Burroughs. The book tells the story of Burroughs's bizarre childhood life after his mother, a chain-smoking aspiring poet, sent him to live with her psychiatrist. Running with Scissors spent eight weeks on the New York Times bestseller list.

== Plot summary ==
Running with Scissors covers the period of Burroughs' adolescent years, beginning at age twelve after a brief overview of his life as a child. Burroughs spends his early childhood in a clean and orderly home, obsessing over his clothes, hair, accessories, and having great potential, with his parents constantly fighting in the background.

When his parents separate and his mother begins to second-guess her sexuality, Burroughs is sent to live with his mother's psychiatrist, Dr. Finch, who lives in a rundown Victorian house in Northampton, Massachusetts. Finch lives with his "legal" wife, Agnes, as well as his two biological children, one adopted child, and some of his own patients. Rules are practically nonexistent and children of all ages do whatever they please, such as having sex, smoking cigarettes and cannabis, and rebelling against authority figures. Finch feels that at age thirteen, children should be in charge of their own lives. However, the dysfunctional issues that occur in the Finch family are outdone by the psychotic episodes frequently experienced by Burroughs' mother.

The Finch house is a parallel universe to the home Burroughs came from. It is filthy, with cockroaches roaming around the uncleaned dishes, Christmas trees left up year-round, stairs up which Burroughs is afraid to walk because he thinks they will collapse under him, and nothing off limits. Eventually, Finch comes to believe that God is communicating with him through his feces and develops a form of divination to try and decipher these messages. When Hope, Finch's second-oldest daughter, believes her cat is dying, she keeps it in a laundry basket for four days until it dies: "Hope said Freud died of kitty leukemia and old age, I thought it was because Freud was stuck under a laundry basket with no food or water for 4 days."

Burroughs' mother is shown as emotionally drained, excessive, self-centered and ultimately incapable of being a parent. She has a sexual relationship with a local minister's wife, which is revealed to Burroughs when he accidentally walks in on them when he skips school. When this relationship ends, Burroughs' mother starts another with an affluent black woman. This romance is tumultuous and unstable. At one point, they have a mental patient named Cesar live at their house after another of his mother's breakdowns as his "dad". Cesar attempts to rape Burroughs while he is sleeping, but is unsuccessful (when Cesar goes to live with the Finches later in the book, he pays one of the Finches' daughters for sex and is then forced from the home). His mother's biggest psychotic episode happens when she and her girlfriend Dorothy move everything out of their house and attack Burroughs when he tries to intervene. This later ends with a "road trip" and events leading to Burroughs' mother being restrained on a bed.

Burroughs tells Dr. Finch's adopted 33-year-old son, Neil Bookman, that he is gay. From the age of 13 to 15, Burroughs has an intense and open sexual relationship with Bookman, which begins when Bookman forces the young boy to perform oral sex on him. Neither his mother nor any member of the Finch family is bothered by their relationship. Burroughs begins to enjoy exacting power over Bookman by threatening to charge him with statutory rape. Bookman is obsessed with the young boy, even though Burroughs has problems with their relationship (going in phases of needing the affection of Bookman to wanting to humiliate or get away from him) which only infatuates Bookman more. Bookman eventually leaves Northampton for New York City and is never heard from again by Burroughs or the Finches, even after they try everything in their power to find him.

Burroughs forms a close relationship with Finch's daughter Natalie, who is one year older than he, even though he dislikes her at the beginning of the book. They do everything together, from finding jobs to running behind a waterfall to demolishing the kitchen ceiling. They finally leave the Finch household together.

At the end of the book, when Burroughs is living in his own apartment with Natalie, he is asked to choose between his mother and Finch when she accuses the doctor of raping her in a motel to cure her of one of her psychotic episodes. He still considers Finch's family and his mother to be his family, and he cannot bring himself to choose sides, although he is fairly certain that Finch did rape his mother. Quoted from the book, Burroughs states: "So it came to this: Was I a turd-reading Finch? Or was I my crazy mother's son? In the end, I decided that I was neither."

== Characters ==
Augusten Burroughs
The main character, son of Deirdre and Norman, was sent to live with his psychotic mother's psychiatrist, Dr. Finch, and his family at the age of 13 and is eventually signed off to the Finch family. He has mild obsessive compulsive tendencies. It is at the Finch house where he enters into a relationship with Neil, trying to live with the insane and dirty living conditions of the Finches while coping with his mother's mental condition. He has a close relationship with Natalie, Dr. Finch's youngest daughter. He has a passion for hair products, wanting to have his name on a line of hair products.
Deirdre Burroughs
Deirdre is the mother of Augusten and was married to Norman until their divorce. She is a mentally unstable poet, who, after her divorce, engages in a relationship with the local minister's wife. She allows Augusten to pretend to attempt suicide so he can be released from school. She has a relationship with a teenage girl after the minister's wife will not divorce her own husband.
Dr. Finch
The psychiatrist of Deirdre, father of Natalie and Hope, and "husband" of Agnes Finch. Although Agnes and Dr. Finch are technically married, Dr. Finch has multiple other relationships with various women, all of whom he calls his wife, saying that Agnes is only his "legal" wife and doesn't understand him. Dr. Finch takes Augusten in, and later legally adopts him, after Deirdre decides she cannot handle the emotional stress of mothering Augusten. Dr. Finch's psychiatric methods are highly unconventional; he unwittingly makes his patients worse instead of curing them by giving them unmarked medicines, using techniques that disturb them, and generally encouraging their unhealthy behavior.
Neil Bookman
The adopted son of Dr. Finch. Soon after Burroughs moves in with the Finches, Neil, who was 33, forms a sexual relationship with Burroughs, who was only 13. He becomes infatuated with and very protective of Burroughs, who rarely returns these feelings, but still maintains a relationship with him. His infatuation eventually turns to obsession and he constantly tells Burroughs he would die if Burroughs left him.
Natalie Finch
The youngest daughter of Dr. Finch and Agnes who is seen as wild, unruly, and promiscuous throughout the memoir, giving her first hand job at the age of 11. She is only one year older than Burroughs, with whom she eventually becomes great friends.
Norman Burroughs
The abusive and alcoholic husband of Deirdre and father of Augusten. His abusive, oppressive relationship with Deirdre is one of the main causes of her instability and Augusten's difficult life. When Augusten later tries to reach out to him, his phone calls are ignored, leading to further estrangement.
Agnes Finch
Mother of the Finch children and wife of Dr. Finch. Her role in the family is small, serving as more of a maid than a wife or mother. No one in the household shows her any respect and rarely even listen to her, telling her constantly to "shut up".
Hope Finch
The older sister to Natalie. She works as a receptionist in Dr. Finch's office and is the first person in the Finch family to befriend Burroughs.
Fern
The first female lover of Deirdre Burroughs. She is a minister's wife with children, and keeps her relationship with Deirdre a secret. The relationship ends when Fern refuses to leave her family.
Dorothy
A teenage, African-American former patient of Dr. Finch who becomes Deirdre's second female lover. Dorothy, who was also mentally unstable, encouraged Deirdre's erratic behavior, finding it exciting. She does everything from setting money on fire to putting broken glass in the bathtub.

== Film adaptation ==
The film adaptation of Running with Scissors, directed by Ryan Murphy, released in 2006, stars Alec Baldwin, Annette Bening, Brian Cox, Joseph Fiennes, Evan Rachel Wood, Jill Clayburgh, Gwyneth Paltrow and Joseph Cross as Burroughs. The plot of the film is focused on the relationship between the mother and the son.

== Legal case ==
In 2005, the family of Dr. Rodolph H. Turcotte (1919–2000) of Massachusetts filed suit against Burroughs and his publisher, alleging defamation of character and invasion of privacy. They stated that they were the basis for the Finch family portrayed in the book but that Burroughs had fabricated or exaggerated various descriptions of their activities.

The case was later settled with Sony Pictures Entertainment in October 2006, prior to the release of the film adaptation. Burroughs and his publisher, St. Martin's Press, settled with the Turcotte family in August 2007. The Turcottes were reportedly seeking damages of $2 million for invasion of privacy, defamation, and emotional distress; the Turcottes alleged Running with Scissors was largely fictional and written in a sensational manner. Burroughs defended his work as "entirely accurate", but agreed to call the work a "book" (instead of a "memoir") in the author's note, to alter the acknowledgments page in future editions to recognize the Turcotte family's conflicting memories of described events, and express regret for "any unintentional harm" to the Turcotte family. Burroughs felt vindicated by the settlement. "I'm not at all sorry that I wrote [the book]. And you know, the suit settled—it settled in my favor. I didn't change a word of the memoir, not one word of it. It's still a memoir, it's marketed as a memoir, they've agreed one hundred percent that it is a memoir."

Future printings of Running with Scissors will contain modified language in the Author's Note and Acknowledgments pages. Where the Acknowledgments page had read: "Additionally, I would like to thank each and every member of a certain Massachusetts family for taking me into their home and accepting me as one of their own," the following was substituted: "Additionally, I would like to thank the real-life members of the family portrayed in this book for taking me into their home and accepting me as one of their own. I recognize that their memories of the events described in this book are different than my own. They are each fine, decent, and hard-working people. The book was not intended to hurt the family. Both my publisher and I regret any unintentional harm resulting from the publishing and marketing of Running with Scissors."

In addition, on the Author's Note page—but, as the family agreed, nowhere else—the word "book" replaced the word "memoir." The work is still described as a memoir on the cover, title page and elsewhere.
