= Without Men =

2011 film by Gabriela Tagliavini

- Film Poster
- Directed by: Gabriela Tagliavini
- Screenplay by: Gabriela Tagliavini
- Based on: Tales from the Town of Widows by James Cañón
- Produced by: Lucas Jarach; Anthony Moody; Jason Price
- Starring: Eva Longoria; Christian Slater; Kate del Castillo; Oscar Nuñez
- Cinematography: Andrew Strahorn
- Music by: Carlo Siliotto
- Production company: Indalo Productions
- Distributed by: Maya Entertainment
- Release date: June 29, 2011
- Running time: 83 minutes
- Country: United States
- Languages: English; Spanish
- Budget: $4.7 million

Without Men is a 2011 American romantic comedy film written and directed by Gabriela Tagliavini and starring Eva Longoria, Christian Slater, Kate del Castillo, and Oscar Nuñez. It is based on the 2007 novel Tales from the Town of Widows by James Cañón.

== Premise ==
Wives in a Latin American village fend for themselves after their husbands are conscripted to fight in a guerrilla war. Comedy, lesbian love, and unexpected consequences arise when the men return to find they are no longer allowed to be in charge.

== Cast ==
- Eva Longoria as Rosalba Viuda de Patiño
- Christian Slater as Gordon Smith
- Oscar Nuñez as Priest Rafael
- Kate del Castillo as Cleotilde Huaniso
- Guillermo Díaz as Campo Elias
- Maria Conchita Alonso as Lucrecia
- Camryn Manheim as Boss
- Paul Rodriguez as Camacho
- Reynaldo Pacheco as Julio
- Mónica Huarte as Cecilia
- Yvette Yates as Virgelina

== Reception ==
Robert Koehler of Variety called it a "cheapo sex comedy stuffed with mugging actors and TV-scale filmmaking."

== See also ==
List of LGBT-related films directed by women
