= List of Colombian Americans =

This is a list of notable Colombian Americans, including both original immigrants who obtained American citizenship and their American descendants.

To be included in this list, the person must have a Wikipedia article showing they are Colombian American or must have references showing they are Colombian American and are notable.

== List ==
=== Artists and designers ===
- Ruvén Afanador (born 1959) – photographer
- Natalia Arbelaez (born 1983) – ceramicist, sculptor, and teacher
- Esteban Cortázar (born 1984) – fashion designer
- Miguel Gómez (born 1974) – photographer
- Guilloume – Colombian minimalist artist, self-described master of "Bolismo"
- Greg Giraldo – comedian
- René Moncada – Colombian-born American artist
- Lari Pittman – painter
- Gala Porras-Kim – conceptual artist
- R. J. Palacio – author and graphic designer
- Diego Suarez (1888–1974) – garden designer known for his work at James Deering's Villa Vizcaya in Miami, Florida

=== Anchors and TV personalities ===
- Julie Banderas – Fox News anchor
- Monica Fonseca (1982–) – television presenter, journalist and blogger
- Ingrid Hoffmann – Colombian-American television personality and restaurateur

=== Actors ===
- Thom Adcox-Hernandez – American voice and television actor of Colombian descent (Falcon Crest, The Twisted Tales of Felix the Cat, Gargoyles)
- Odette Annable – American actress of Colombian, French, and Cuban descent
- Moisés Arias – Colombian American actor
- Yancey Arias – American actor of Colombian and Puerto Rican descent
- Stephanie Beatriz – American actress of Colombian father
- Lillo Brancato – Colombian-born American actor (A Bronx Tale, The Sopranos).
- Héctor Luis Bustamante – Colombian American actor
- Sasha Calle – Colombian American actress
- Sofia Carson – Colombian American actress known for the movie Descendants
- Adriana Cataño – American actress and television host
- Alyssa Diaz – American actress of Colombian and Mexican-American descent
- Paula Garcés – actress
- Isabella Gomez – Colombian-born American actress
- Diane Guerrero – American actress of Colombian descent
- Zulay Henao – film and television actress
- Andrew Keegan – actor, mother is Colombian.
- John Leguizamo (1964–) – Colombian-born American actor and comedian
- Melissa Navia – actress, known for Star Trek: Strange New Worlds
- Kika Perez – born Ilva Margarita Perez, Colombian-American actress and TV host
- Lumi Pollack (2009–) – American actress of Japanese, Colombian and Jewish descent
- Danny Ramirez (1992–) – American actor of Colombian and Mexican descent
- Carolina Ravassa (1985–) – Colombian-born American actress
- Sonya Smith – American actress best known for her roles in telenovelas. Her mother is Venezuelan and her father is of Colombian partially descent.
- Allison Strong, singer/actress known for Bye Bye Birdie, Mamma Mia!, and The Week Of.
- Diego Tinoco (1997–) – actor, his father is Mexican and his mother Ecuadorian from Colombian descent.
- Paola Turbay (1970–) – actress, TV host and beauty queen
- Brittany Underwood – American actress to Colombian mother
- Wilmer Valderrama – actor, of Colombian and Venezuelan descent.
- Carlos Valdes – Colombian-born American actor, Cisco Ramon on the TV series The Flash
- Alexa Vega – American actress from Colombian father
- Makenzie Vega – American actress, young sister of Alexa Vega
- Sofía Vergara (1972–) – Colombian actress, known for the series Modern Family
- Rachel Zegler – of Colombian and Polish descent

=== Musicians ===
- Kali Uchis (1994–) – Colombian-American singer and songwriter
- Lil Pump – Florida rapper born to Colombian parents (as stated in an interview with J. Cole)
- Psycho Les – hip hop emcee of the group The Beatnuts
- Adassa – American reggaetón singer-songwriter also known as the "Reggaetón Princess". She was born to Afro-Colombians parents.
- Ryan Cabrera – American singer born to a Colombian father and an American mother
- Jason Castro – singer-songwriter
- Freddy Cricien – American emcee and vocalist for the hardcore band Madball
- Robo (1955–) – drummer (Black Flag, Misfits)
- Yasmin Deliz – American singer-songwriter, model and actress of Dominican and Colombian and Venezuelan parentage.
- Carlos Dengler (1974–) – former bassist of the band Interpol
- Santiago Durango – guitarist (Big Black, Naked Raygun)
- Alex González (musician) (1969–) – American-born musician of Cuban and Colombian origin.
- Jaafar Jackson (1996–) - American singer and actor born to a Colombian mother.
- Danny Mercer – Colombian American recording artist, songwriter, and producer
- Ericson Alexander Molano – Gospel Christian singer
- Erick Morillo – Colombian-American DJ, music producer and record label owner
- Billy Murcia – drummer (New York Dolls).
- Kike Santander – Colombian songwriter and producer naturalized in the United States in 2004
- Marty Stuart – American country music singer-songwriter. He is of French, English, Choctaw, and Colombian descent.
- Tonedeff – American rapper, producer, and singer-songwriter. He was born to a Cuban mother and a Colombian father.
- Andrés Useche – Colombian American writer, film director, graphic artist, singer-songwriter and activist.
- DJ Yonny – American DJ, producer and remixer.
- Rob Swift – (born Robert Aguilar) American hip hop DJ and turntablist group The X-Ecutioners as of late 2005 and as of 2006; with Mike Patton's project Peeping Tom. Rob Swift is on the faculty of Scratch DJ Academy in New York City.
- Soraya (1969–2006) – Colombian-American songwriter, guitarist, arranger and record producer.

=== Sports ===
- Jorge Acosta – soccer player, U.S. national team (early 1990s)
- Austin Bergner – baseball player
- Jesus Ferreira - soccer player, U.S. national team
- Roberto Guerrero (1958–) – Formula One racecar driver
- Juan Pablo Montoya (1975–) – Formula One, Indy and Cart racecar driver
- Juan Agudelo – soccer player
- Kiko Alonso – NFL player
- Alejandro Bedoya – American soccer player
- Daniel Barrera – American professional soccer player
- Lou Castro – first Latin American born player to play in Major League Baseball in the United States, and the first Latin American since player Esteban Bellán in 1873 as a professional baseball player.
- Diego Corrales (1977–2007) – world champion boxer, father is Colombian and mother is Mexican
- Rio Gomez – baseball player
- Scott Gomez – retired NHL player. Half Colombian and half Mexican.
- Christian González - NFL player, parents are Colombian
- Melissa Gonzalez – hurdler and sprinter. Parents are Colombian; she holds American citizenship by birthright.
- Diego Gutiérrez – retired Colombian American footballer
- Eliot Halverson – American figure skater
- George Hincapie – cyclist
- Carlos Llamosa – soccer player
- Evan Mendoza – professional baseball player
- Oscar Mercado – MLB player
- Greg Nappo – professional baseball player
- Melissa Ortiz – soccer player
- Travis Pastrana – American motorsports competitor and stunt performer who has won championships and X Games gold medals in several events
- Fuad Reveiz (1963–) – former NFL player
- Alexander Shaw – soccer player
- Johnny Torres – Colombian-American soccer midfielder and coach
- Fernando Velasco – former NFL player

=== Models ===
- Manuela Arbeláez – model (The Price Is Right).
- Maria Checa – Colombian-American model and actress.

=== Journalists ===
- Nina García (1965–) – fashion journalist and critic (Project Runway, Elle, Marie Claire).
- Omar Jimenez – journalist and correspondent for CNN
- Adrian Lamo – hacker and journalist.
- Manuel Teodoro (1960–) – journalist (CBS News, Univision) (also has Filipino descent).

=== Politicians ===
- Sandra Cano – Rhode Island State Senator
- Catalina Cruz – New York State Assemblywoman
- Antonio Delgado – Lieutenant Governor of New York and former U.S. Representative for New York's 19th Congressional District
- Diana Farrell – member and one of two deputy directors of the United States National Economic Council (NEC) in the administration of President Barack Obama.
- Jeff Frederick – former member of the General Assembly of Virginia.
- Ruben Gallego – U.S. Representative for Arizona's 7th congressional district and United States Senator from Arizona
- Valentina Gomez - Republican Party candidate for Texas
- Lina Hidalgo – county judge for Harris County, Texas
- Jon Koznick – Minnesota State Representative
- Analilia Mejia – U.S. Representative for New Jersey's 11th congressional district
- Bernie Moreno – businessman and United States Senator from Ohio
- Scott Perry – U.S. Representative for Pennsylvania's 10th congressional district
- José Sarria – first openly gay candidate for public office in the United States
- Annette Taddeo – Florida State Senator
- Juan C. Zapata – Miami-Dade County Commissioner, Florida State Representative

=== Writers ===
- James Cañón – Colombian author
- Mo Rocca – American writer, journalist, comedian and political satirist to Colombian (mother) and Italian (father) descent.
- Andrés Useche – Colombian American naturalized writer, film director, graphic artist and singer/songwriter
- Jaime Manrique – Colombian American novelist, poet, essayist, educator, and translator.
- R. J. Palacio – Mexican-born American author to Colombian parents.

=== Scientists ===
- Jaime Imitola – neuroimmunologist
- Juan B. Gutierrez – mathematician and author
- Rodolfo Llinás (1934–) – neuroscientist
- Guillermo Owen – mathematician
- Ana María Rey – physicist

=== Others ===
- Medaria Arradondo – Minneapolis police chief
- José Luis Castillo (activist) – Colombian-American activist, politician, and non-profit community liaison in south Florida. He was born to a Dutch mother and a Colombian father in Netherlands. He lives in Florida.
- Arturo Escobar – Colombian-American anthropologist primarily known for his contribution to postdevelopment theory and political ecology
- Carlos Goez (1939–1990) – founder of the original Pomander Book Shop in New York
- Will Jimeno – police officer, 9/11 survivor, portrayed in World Trade Center
- Bernard Loeffke (1934–) – Colombian-born U.S. Army major general, commander of United States Army South
- Andre Melendez (1971–1996) – better known as Angel Melendez, was a Club Kid and drug dealer who lived and worked in New York City
- Beto Pérez – Colombian born American dancer and choreographer who created the fitness program Zumba in the 1990s
- Cristina Pérez – judge
- Julio Mario Santo Domingo (1923–2011) – Colombian billionaire
- Alejandro Santo Domingo (1977–) – Colombian American financier
- Al Williamson (1931–2010) – American cartoonist, comic book artist and illustrator specializing in adventure, Western and science-fiction/fantasy.
- George Zamka – NASA astronaut
- Laura DePuy (1971–) – Colombian-American colorist who has produced work for several of the major comics companies, including DC Comics, Marvel Comics and CrossGen.
