= Stefan Czapsky =

American cinematographer

- Born: 15 December 1950 (age 75); Oldenburg, West Germany
- Education: Case Western Reserve; Columbia University
- Years active: 1976–2023

Stefan Czapsky, A.S.C. (born 15 December 1950) is an American cinematographer.

== Early life and education ==
Born in Oldenburg, West Germany to Ukrainian parents, his family emigrated to the United States while he was still an infant and settled in Cleveland.

== Career ==
Graduating from Case Western Reserve University with a BFA in the humanities and an emphasis on film history and criticism, Czapsky moved to New York City, where he attended a film studies graduate program at Columbia University and began working in the film production business in positions such as assistant cameraman, gaffer, and key grip, for productions like After Hours, Matewan, and Q.

His first feature film, On the Edge, was praised by Roger Ebert, who noted, "The movie creates a real sense of place: These aren’t Hollywood locations but rooms where human voices sound at home."

The independent success secured Czapsky a cinematographer role alongside Robert Chappell for Erroll Morris’ The Thin Blue Line and Robert Bierman’s Vampire’s Kiss.

Czapsky's more notable work has been with expressionist director Tim Burton, starting with Edward Scissorhands, which was praised for its ethereal atmosphere; then Batman Returns, which was shot on a Panavision Panaflex Gold II in 35mm; and Ed Wood, which would prove to be their most critically successful.

Batman Returns star Danny DeVito teamed up with Czapsky to work on the 1996 film Matilda.

From 2016, Czapsky shifted his work towards television, shooting episodes of Shades of Blue, Quantico, and God Friended Me.

== Filmography ==
Film

Year	Title	Director
1985	On the Edge	Rob Nilsson
1988	Vampire's Kiss	Robert Bierman
1989	Last Exit to Brooklyn	Uli Edel
1989	Fear, Anxiety & Depression	Todd Solondz
1989	Sons	Alexandre Rockwell
1990	Flashback	Franco Amurri
1990	Child's Play 2	John Lafia
1990	Edward Scissorhands	Tim Burton
1991	The Dark Wind	Errol Morris
1992	Batman Returns	Tim Burton
1992	Prelude to a Kiss	Norman René
1994	Ed Wood	Tim Burton
1996	Matilda	Danny DeVito
2003	Bulletproof Monk	Paul Hunter
2007	Blades of Glory	Will Speck; Josh Gordon
2009	Fighting	Dito Montiel
2012	Safe	Boaz Yakin
2015	Max	Boaz Yakin
2022	Christmas with You	Gabriela Tagliavini

Documentary film

Year	Title	Director	Notes
1988	The Thin Blue Line	Errol Morris	With Robert Chappell
1991	A Brief History of Time	Errol Morris	With John Bailey

Television

Year	Title	Director	Notes
2016	Drew	James Strong	TV movie
2016-2017	Shades of Blue		All 36 episodes
2018	Quantico		10 episodes
2018-2020	God Friended Me		20 episodes
2021	Stargirl	Andi Armaganian	2 episodes
2022-2023	Law & Order: Organized Crime		11 episodes
