= Joey Pollari =

American actor (born 1994)

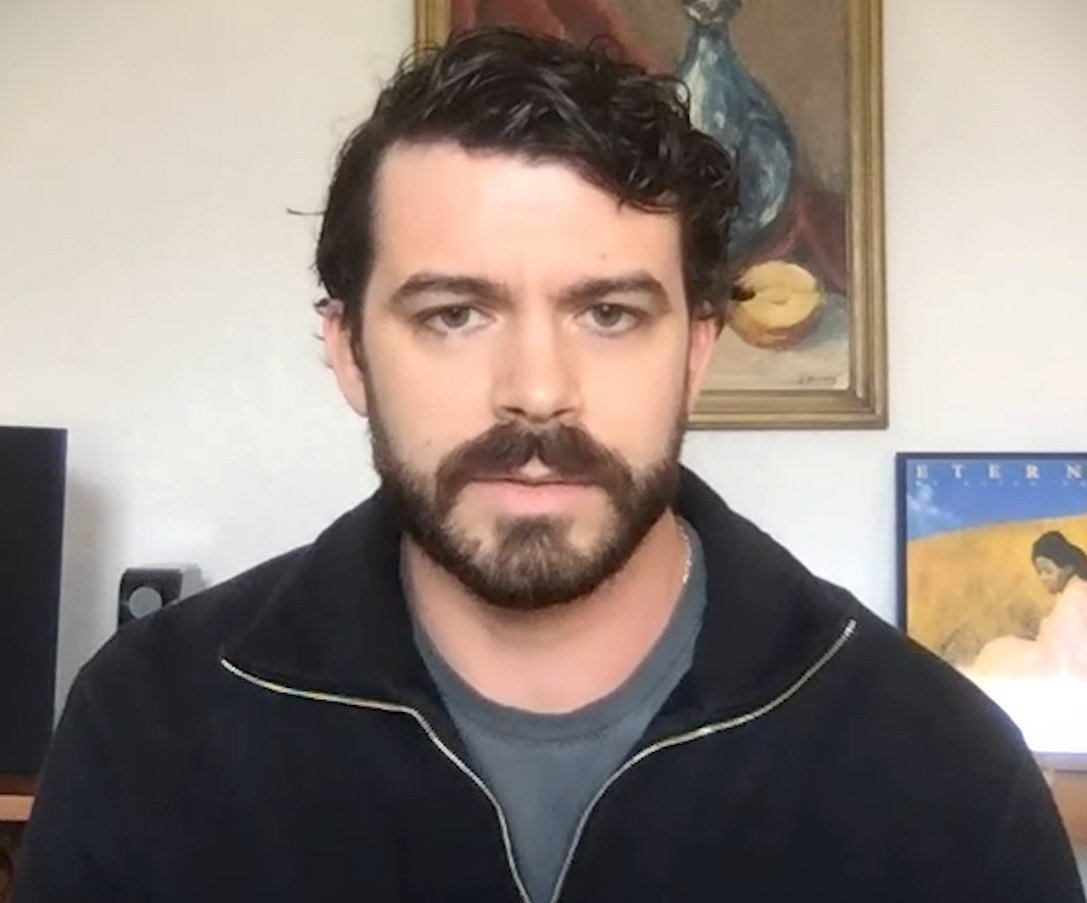
- Pollari in 2025
- Born: Joseph James Pollari; April 9, 1994 (age 32); St. Paul, Minnesota, U.S.
- Occupations: Actor; musician; director
- Years active: 2006–present

Joey Pollari (born April 9, 1994) is an American actor, musician, and director. He first gained recognition for his role as Eric Tanner in the second season of the ABC series American Crime, and later appeared as Lyle, one of Simon's potential love interests, in the 2018 film Love, Simon. Beginning in 2025, he became a frequent collaborator of Ryan Murphy, first appearing in Monster: The Ed Gein Story, followed by The Beauty, Monster: The Lizzie Borden Story, and American Horror Story: 13 (all 2026).

In 2020, Pollari released his debut album, About Men, followed by his second album, I'll Be Romance, on April 5, 2024. On September 15th, 2026, he released The Low Gives Weight, the first preview of his forthcoming third record.

== Early life ==
Pollari was born on April 9, 1994 in St. Paul, Minnesota to Kevin and Andrea (Copeland) Pollari. His surname comes from his Finnish ancestry.

== Career ==
=== Acting ===
He started his acting career when he attended a scouting event in downtown Minneapolis with his mother. He received callbacks the next day from agents who wanted to represent him. Pollari has appeared in stage productions at the Guthrie Theater in Minneapolis, the Ordway Center for the Performing Arts in Saint Paul, and the SteppingStone Theatre for Youth Development, also in Saint Paul.

On April 30, 2006, Pollari appeared as a newsboy in "The Hen House", an episode of the police procedural television series Cold Case. The Walt Disney Company cast him in Skyrunners, a 2009 Disney XD Original Movie about two brothers who stumble upon a spaceship that is sought after by the FBI agents and space aliens. The film, which was shot in New Zealand, premiered on Disney XD on November 27, 2009. Pollari was 15 years old when it first aired. His co-star in the film, Kelly Blatz, a long-time friend of Pollari, said Pollari grew "like a foot taller and his voice changed and everything" during the filming of Skyrunners.

In 2018, Pollari had a supporting role in the teen romantic comedy Love, Simon as Lyle, one of Simon's potential boyfriends. In 2019, he appeared in another gay-themed film, The Obituary of Tunde Johnson.

In 2023, he appeared as a pivotal guest star on SEAL Team for Paramount+, playing a grieving vet whose guilt comes with dire consequences.

In 2024, he was in a recurring role for Sugar on Apple TV+ starring Colin Farrell and Amy Ryan.

In 2025, he starred in a gay rom-com Things Like This written and directed by Max Talisman, and he played Anthony Perkins in Monster: The Ed Gein Story on Netflix starring Charlie Hunnam.

In 2026, he guest-starred in The Beauty (TV series) alongside Rebecca Hall and Evan Peters, and in the fall of 2026, he joined the cast of American Horror Story: 13 in the starring role of Ben DeSoto, a young man who is haunted by the number 13.

=== Music ===
In 2020, Pollari released an album, About Men. In a June 2020 interview, Pollari said that he is still acting, but in his free time, he will be releasing more music and directing music videos. In 2023, he announced an EP, Last Evenings, that was released October 25. His first single, "Supine Soundtrack," was released September 15, and was followed by a second single, "Aliveness," which he self-directed a video for.

In January 2024, he announced a second full-length album, "I'll Be Romance," with an accompanying first single and self-directed music video for "So Close." The video was called both "dreamy and rousing," and Pollari's songwriting was compared to "Nick Cave and Leonard Cohen, his baritone delivery fixated on enveloping the listener in a vivid and introspective narrative" by Wonderland Magazine. The album has been teased as "a sonorous balm that seems to touch on vintage tropes" by Clash Magazine, and was released April 5, 2024.

In September 2026, he premiered the music video and single for "The Low Gives Weight," the first preview of his forthcoming third album. The song premiered with an interview in which Pollari said he wrote half the song in Polari, "a historical British cant invented by gay men to speak openly in public while homosexuality was criminalized between the 16th and 19th centuries."

== Personal life ==
He is gay, having come out at 18 to friends and family.

== Filmography ==
=== Film ===
Year	Title	Role	Notes
2012	Profile of a Killer	David Jenks	
2014	Ethereal	Asher	Short film
2015	Eden	Georgie	
2018	Love, Simon	Lyle	
2019	The Obituary of Tunde Johnson	Charlie	
2025	Things Like This	Zack	

=== Television ===
Year	Title	Role	Notes
2006	Cold Case	Newsboy	Episode: "The Hen House"
2009	Skyrunners	Tyler Burns	Disney XD Original Movie
2010	Avalon High	Miles	Disney Channel Original Movie
2012	Up All Night	Mark	Episode: "I Can't Quit You"
2012	The Inbetweeners	Will McKenzie	Lead role; 12 episodes
2014	Saint George	Tanner Whitman	4 episodes
2014	Major Crimes	Wesley Grant	Episode: "Party Foul"
2016	American Crime	Eric Tanner	Main role (season 2); 10 episodes
2022–2024	SEAL Team	Ben	Recurring role; 5 episodes
2024	Sugar	Moss	4 episodes
2025	Monster: The Ed Gein Story	Anthony Perkins	3 episodes
2026	The Beauty	Mike McGuinn (Post Beauty)	Episodes: "Beautiful Jordan"; "Beautiful Patient Zero"
2026	Monster: The Lizzie Borden Story	John Morse	Recurring role; 5 episodes
2026	American Horror Story: 13	Ben DeSoto	Main role; 11 episodes
