= Christmas with You (film) =

- Release poster
- Directed by: Gabriela Tagliavini
- Written by: Paco Farias; Jennifer C. Stetson; Michael Varrati
- Produced by: Lucas Jarach; German Michael Torres
- Starring: Aimee Garcia; Freddie Prinze Jr.
- Cinematography: Stefan Czapsky
- Edited by: Michael Jablow
- Music by: Pancho Burgos-Goizueta
- Production company: GMT Films
- Distributed by: Netflix
- Release date: November 17, 2022
- Running time: 89 minutes
- Country: United States
- Language: English

Christmas with You is a 2022 American Christmas romantic comedy film directed by Gabriela Tagliavini, written by Paco Farias, Jennifer C. Stetson and Michael Varrati, and starring Aimee Garcia and Freddie Prinze Jr. It was released on Netflix on November 17, 2022.

== Plot ==
Angelina Costa, a Latina pop singer-songwriter since her teens, is under a lot of pressure to stay relevant. 20-somethings in the industry imply she's not keeping up. Barry from her record label expects her to come up with a Christmas song by a gala on Sunday.

Having a panic attack, Angelina drags her manager Monique on an impromptu road trip north to meet teenage fan Cristina Torres, whose Christmas wish is to meet her. As the video of the cover she posted was geotagged, Angelina easily finds her at her high school, where her dad Miguel is the music teacher.

As a snow storm comes in, Angelina and Mo are invited to dinner and then to stay over until the roads are cleared. The singer and teen discover they both lost their mothers not long ago. Over dinner it is revealed that Angelina has been dating soap star Ricardo, one of grandma Frida's favorites.

Angelina finds the song Miguel has been writing on the piano, and soon she is collaborating with him to complete it. Finally feeling inspired, she accompanies him and Cristina to her quinceañera practice so they can continue working on the song. There, Angelina helps the teens with their choreography, which Cristina's aunts record and put up on social media.

Going back to the Torres', Angelina spends time with the family making food. Afterwards, when she and Miguel get stuck on the chorus, he takes her out to see the Christmas lights and the missing lyrics come to her. They spend the rest of the day putting it all together, falling asleep together in the living room.

They wake to Ricardo's loud knocking on the front door. He located Angelina thanks to the aunts' posts. Ricardo abruptly takes her back to NYC, to ensure she makes it to the gala. Back home, he criticizes Angelina for possibly 'hurting their brand', so upon reflection she agrees to keep up appearances.

Mo collects Cristina and Miguel for the gala, where they are given formal wear. Once Angelina is about to perform their song, she asks him to accompany her on stage. They introduce "Christmas Without You" very successfully.

Out in the lobby, Ricardo and Barry try to sweep Angelina away, so Miguel and Cristina start to leave. She cannot convince him to potentially tour with her and will not admit her feelings for him. Angelina gets offered a spot on Saturday Night Live, the same day as Cristina's quinceañera, so Miguel says Cristina will understand that she is unavailable.

Back in upstate New York, the Torres family sees on TV that Ricardo publicly dumped Angelina. Cristina says she regrets having connected with the singer, but Miguel insists it was a great experience for them all.

Both Angelina and Miguel miss each other, and coworkers motivate her to abandon the SNL gig to make it to the quinceañera. She makes a surprise appearance, to everyone's delight. Afterwards, Angelina and Miguel decide to spend the holiday together, sealing it with a kiss.

Their song hits number 1 on the charts.

== Cast ==
- Freddie Prinze Jr. as Miguel
- Aimee Garcia as Angelina
- Grace Dumdaw as Madison Sparks
- Gabriel Sloyer as Ricardo
- Deja Monique Cruz as Cristina
- Zenzi Williams as Monique
- Socorro Santiago as Frida
- Lawrence J. Hughes as Barry
- Nicolette Stephanie Templier as Cheri Bibi

== Release ==
The film was released on Netflix on November 17, 2022.

== Reception ==
The film has a 67% rating on Rotten Tomatoes based on fifteen reviews.

Noel Murray of the Los Angeles Times gave the film a positive review and wrote, "Still, Garcia and Prinze are so likable that it's satisfying to see them spend an hour or so of screen time figuring out what the audience knows right away."

Samantha Bergeson of IndieWire graded the film a D and wrote, "Not even Santa Claus can save Christmas with You, and he wasn't invited to make an appearance in this cheerless reminder that sometimes it's better to have a Silent Night than a crappy movie."

Brittany Witherspoon of Screen Rant awarded the film three stars out of five and wrote, "It's cheesy in all the right places and serious in very few, but Christmas With You is reliably sweet and sincere when it needs to be."

Ben Kenigsberg of The New York Times gave the film a negative review and wrote, "By far the sturdiest component of Christmas With You is Freddie Prinze Jr.'s hair. Who sculpted it to such a disconcerting spike? Did it time-travel from the late 1990s? Does gravity apply to it?"

Lauren Mechling of The Guardian awarded the film three stars out of five and wrote, "Christmas with You could hardly be a more generic title, and the 90-minute bundle of anodyne cheer lives up to its vanilla promise."

Courtney Howard of Variety gave the film a positive review and wrote, "Christmas with You is a holiday trifle for sure, but there's enough to feel satiated — if just temporarily — by the festivities on display."

== See also ==
- List of Christmas films
