= Grace Dumdaw =

Kachin singer and actress

- Born: Seng Hkam Pan; March 21, 1999 (age 27); Myanmar
- Occupations: Singer; actor
- Years active: 2021–present
- Musical career
- Origin: New York City, U.S.
- Instrument: Vocals
- Years active: 2022–present
- Label: EQT Recordings
- Member of: Chanpan
- Formerly of: Offbeat
- Website: gracedumdaw.com

Grace Hkam Dumdaw (born Seng Hkam Pan; March 21, 1999) is a Burmese-American singer and actor. They (Note: Dumdaw is non-binary and prefers they/them pronouns.) are best known for being the lead singer of New York City-based band Chanpan.

== Early life ==
Dumdaw was born on March 21, 1999 in Myanmar.

Dumdaw spent their childhood in New Orleans, Louisiana, before moving to Swarthmore, Pennsylvania to attend Swarthmore College. They later moved to New York City.

== Career ==
Dumdaw first started as the singer for a cappella group Offbeat, while also acting in campus productions and being a photographer during their years at Swarthmore College.

In 2022, Dumdaw and twins Lance and Matthew Tran came together to busk in New York City, later forming the band Chanpan.

== Filmography ==
=== Film ===
Year	Title	Role	Notes	Ref.
2022	Christmas with You	Madison Sparks		
2023	No Keepsakes	Millie	Short films	
2025	Standby	Tanny	Short films	
2026	One Night Only	Bina von Stauffenberg		

=== Television ===
Year	Title	Role	Notes	Ref.
2021	New Amsterdam	Chesa	Episode: "This Be the Verse"	
2021	Succession	Assistant	Episode: "Too Much Birthday"	
2021	Gossip Girl	Popular Girl	Episode: "Gossip Gone, Girl"	
2022	The Watcher	Young Miko	Episode: "The Gloaming"	
2023	The Blacklist	Alicia	Episode: "Blair Foster"	
2023	And Just Like That...	Eden	Episode: "The Real Deal"	
2024	FBI: Most Wanted	Poppy Lee	Episode: "Ghost in the Machine"	
2024	The Equalizer	Chloe Ward	Episode: "Just Fans"	
2025	Platonic	Hannah	Episode: "The Engagement Party"	
2026	American Horror Story: 13	New NYC Witch	Episode: "Devil of a Good Time"	

=== Music video appearances ===
Music video appearances
Year	Song title	Artist	Ref.
2023	Love Like This	Zayn Malik	
