= On the Edge (1986 film) =

1986 film by Rob Nilsson

- Directed by: Rob Nilsson
- Screenplay by: Roy Kissin; Rob Nilsson
- Produced by: Jeffrey L. Hayes; Rob Nilsson
- Starring: Bruce Dern; Pam Grier; Bill Bailey; Jim Haynie; John Marley; Marty Liquori
- Cinematography: Stefan Czapsky
- Edited by: Richard Harkness; Bert Lovitt
- Music by: Herb Pilhofer
- Production companies: Alliance Communications Corporation; IFI; New Front Films
- Distributed by: Skouras Pictures
- Release date: May 2, 1986
- Running time: 95 minutes
- Country: United States
- Language: English

On the Edge is a 1986 American drama film directed by Rob Nilsson, and written by Nilsson and Roy Kissin. It stars Bruce Dern, Pam Grier, Bill Bailey, Jim Haynie, John Marley (in his final film appearance) and Marty Liquori. The film was released on May 2, 1986, by Skouras Pictures.

The competition depicted in the film is based on the Dipsea Race, a trail race over a treacherous terrain first run in 1905.

== Plot ==
A gaunt, bushy-bearded, 44-year-old Wes Holman returns to his Marin County roots after a 20-year absence, determined to enter one of America's oldest distance races.

Holman was banned from competition after being a whistle-blower about illegal under-the-table payments to amateur athletes two decades before. He seeks out his old trainer, Elmo, to help get him ready for his comeback, but is denied official entry.

After visiting with his aging father "Flash," a union organizer who lives in a junkyard, Holman decides to enter the race without permission. As he negotiates the harrowing 7.5-mile trails, race organizers make strenuous attempts to impede Holman or force him out of the competition before the finish line. His fellow athletes protect his flanks, however, and escort him all the way to a victorious finish.

== Cast ==
- Bruce Dern as Wes Holman
- Pam Grier as Cora
- Bill Bailey as Flash Holman
- Jim Haynie as Owen Riley
- John Marley as Elmo
- Marty Liquori as TV Announcer

== Production ==
Dern worked for a deferred salary to participate in the film, which had a budget of $1.6 million. It was shot in 1983 but not distributed until late 1985 when Skouras Pictures picked it up. Pam Grier's role was cut from the theatrical release but reinstated in VHS versions

In a 1986 interview, Dern said that writer-director Rob Nilsson and co-producer Jeffrey Hayes raised an initial $300,000 of the $1.6 million budget by "going to races around the country and seeking contributions of as little as $10. This picture has more than 3,000 backers." .

The movie revolved around a fictional race called the ‘Cielo-Sea’, based on the real Dipsea Race, which is the oldest trail race in America. Dern apparently ran the Dipsea in 1974.

Filming took place in the California towns of Sausalito and Richmond, and on trail areas of Mount Tamalpais where the actual Dipsea Race is held. Nilsson and cinematographer Czapsky used Steadicam operators riding on motorcycles, dollies, and pickup trucks to film runners. Some shots from the runners’ POV were captured by second unit director-camera operator Stephen Lighthill running with a camera either under his arm or dangling by his knee.

Described as an 'unabashed running junkie', lead Bruce Dern was an early participant of long distance running events, and used to run between 2,500 and 4,000 miles a year from the ages of 28 to 70.

Writer Roy Kissin has run the Dipsea multiple times and is featured as one of the runners that cross the line holding hands with Bruce Dern, wearing race number 321

John Marley died shortly after completing his role; On the Edge was his final screen appearance and is dedicated to his memory.

== Reaction ==
In his May 2, 1986 Chicago Sun-Times review, critic Roger Ebert awarded the film three-and-a-half out of a possible four stars, singling out Bruce Dern "in one of his best performances."

Nina Darnton in the New York Times wrote that On the Edge was an "upbeat, beautifully photographed film".

In a 2014 interview with Runner's World, Bruce Dern said, "On the Edge didn't do well, and you know why as well as I do: Runners are cheap mothers. If they don't see it at screening, they're not going to pay to see it, and they didn't get out and embrace it. I thought it was because the movie wasn't good. No, it's a good movie about running"

In 2013, Dern said On the Edge was one of three movies he was most disappointed people hadn't seen.

== See also ==
- List of films about the sport of athletics
