= American Horror Story: 13 =

Thirteenth season of American Horror Story

- Season 13
- Promotional poster
- Showrunner: Ryan Murphy
- Starring: Sarah Paulson; Evan Peters; Angela Bassett; Kathy Bates; Emma Roberts; Billie Lourd; Gabourey Sidibe; Leslie Grossman; Frances Conroy; Joey Pollari; Jessica Lange
- No. of episodes: 13

Release
- Original network: FX
- Original release: September 24 – October 29, 2026

Season chronology
- ← Previous; Delicate

The thirteenth season of the American horror anthology television series American Horror Story, subtitled 13, takes place primarily in New York City, and follows Ben DeSoto (portrayed by Joey Pollari), a hospice caretaker suffering from triskaidekaphobia, who takes a strange job at The Apollyon, an eerie residential building inhabited by characters from seasons past. The season also features the return of regular actors Sarah Paulson, Evan Peters, Emma Roberts, Billie Lourd, Kathy Bates, Angela Bassett, Gabourey Sidibe, Leslie Grossman, Frances Conroy, Jamie Brewer, John Carroll Lynch, Mena Suvari, Mat Fraser and Jessica Lange.

Created by Ryan Murphy and Brad Falchuk for the cable network FX, the series is produced by 20th Television. The season began filming on April 6, 2026, and concluded on July 27; the subtitle was announced the day after filming finished. 13 premiered on September 24, 2026, and ran until October 29, consisting of thirteen episodes released in mostly either pairs or trios.

== Cast and characters ==
=== Main ===
13 main cast

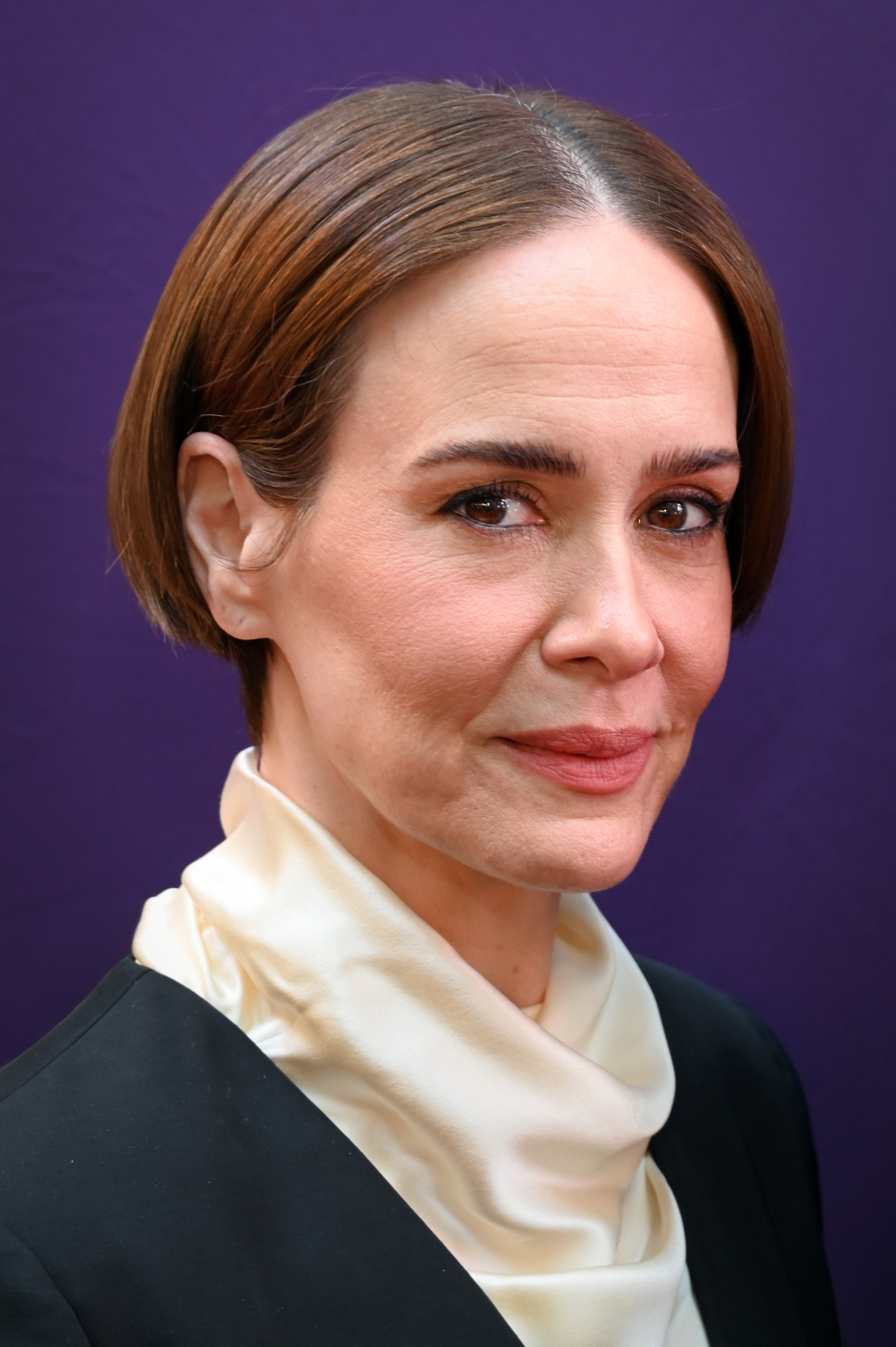
Sarah Paulson

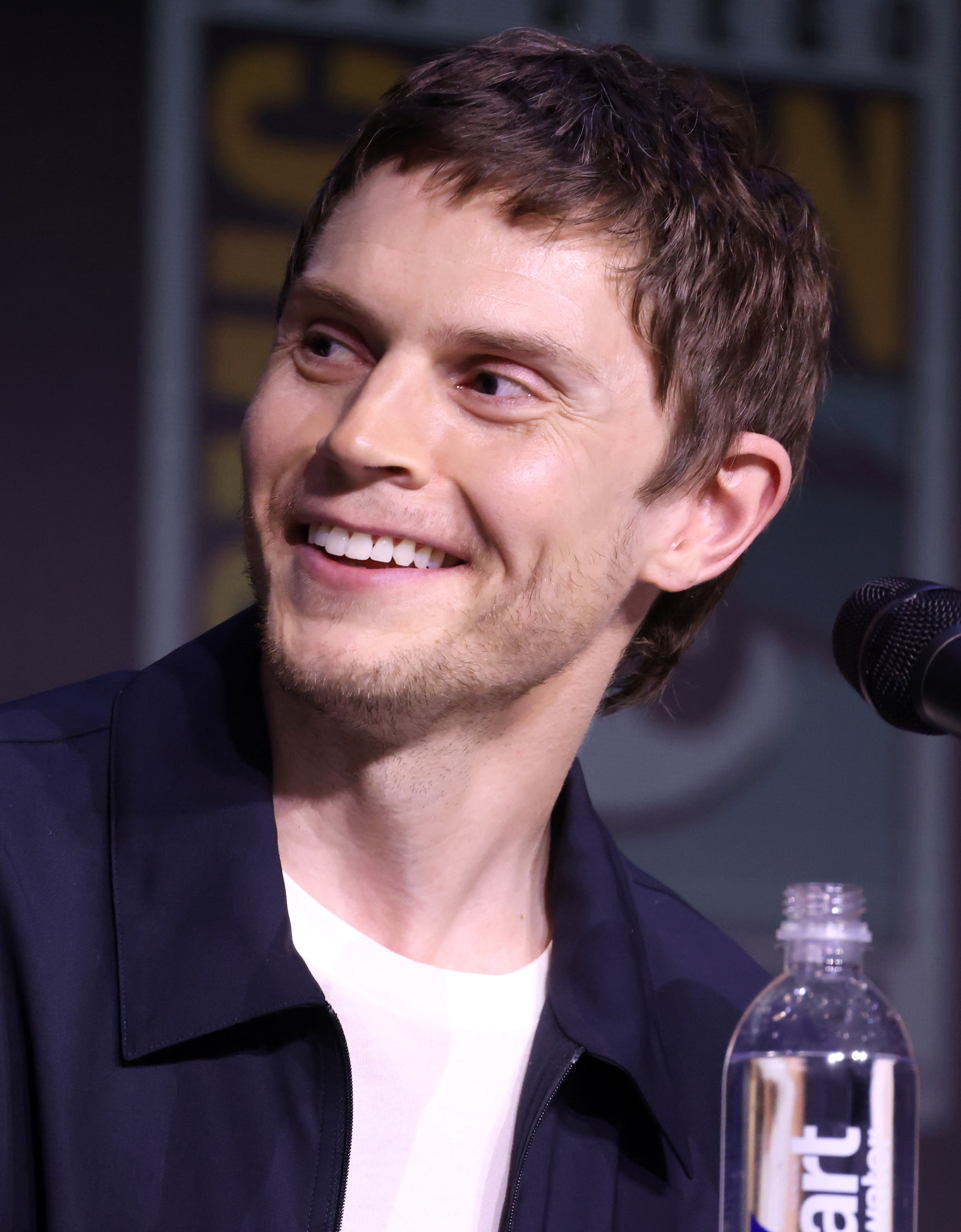
Evan Peters

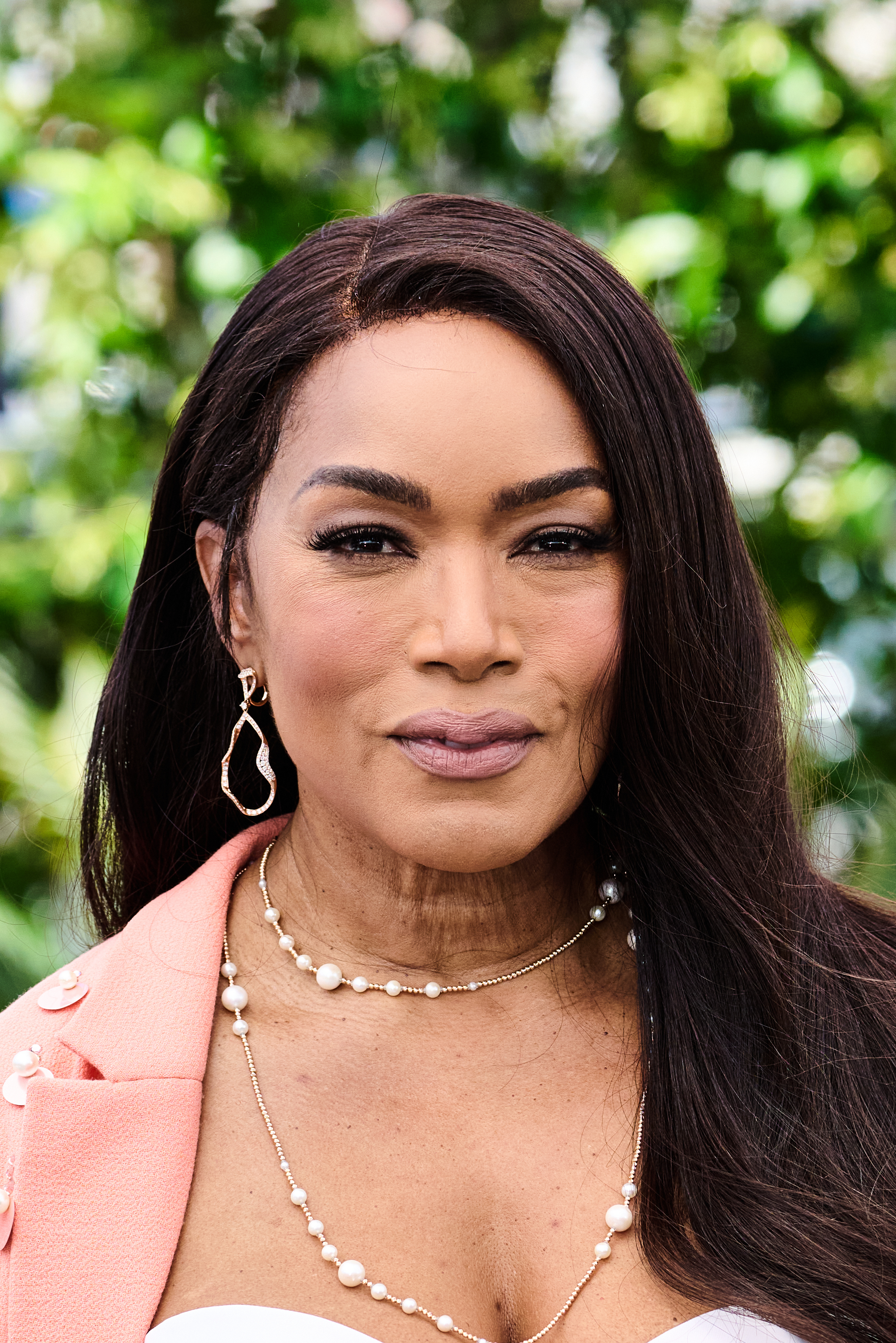
Angela Bassett

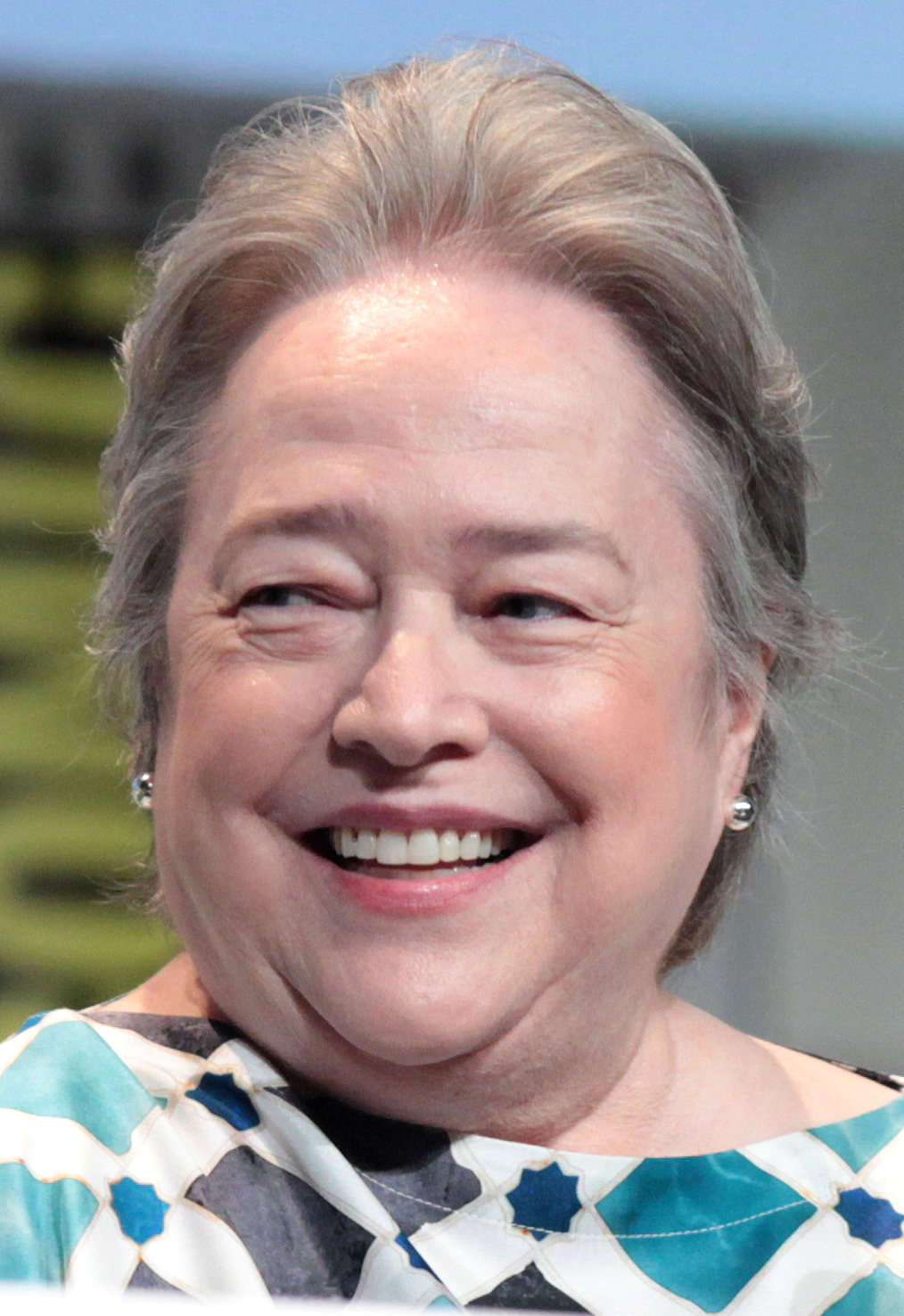
Kathy Bates

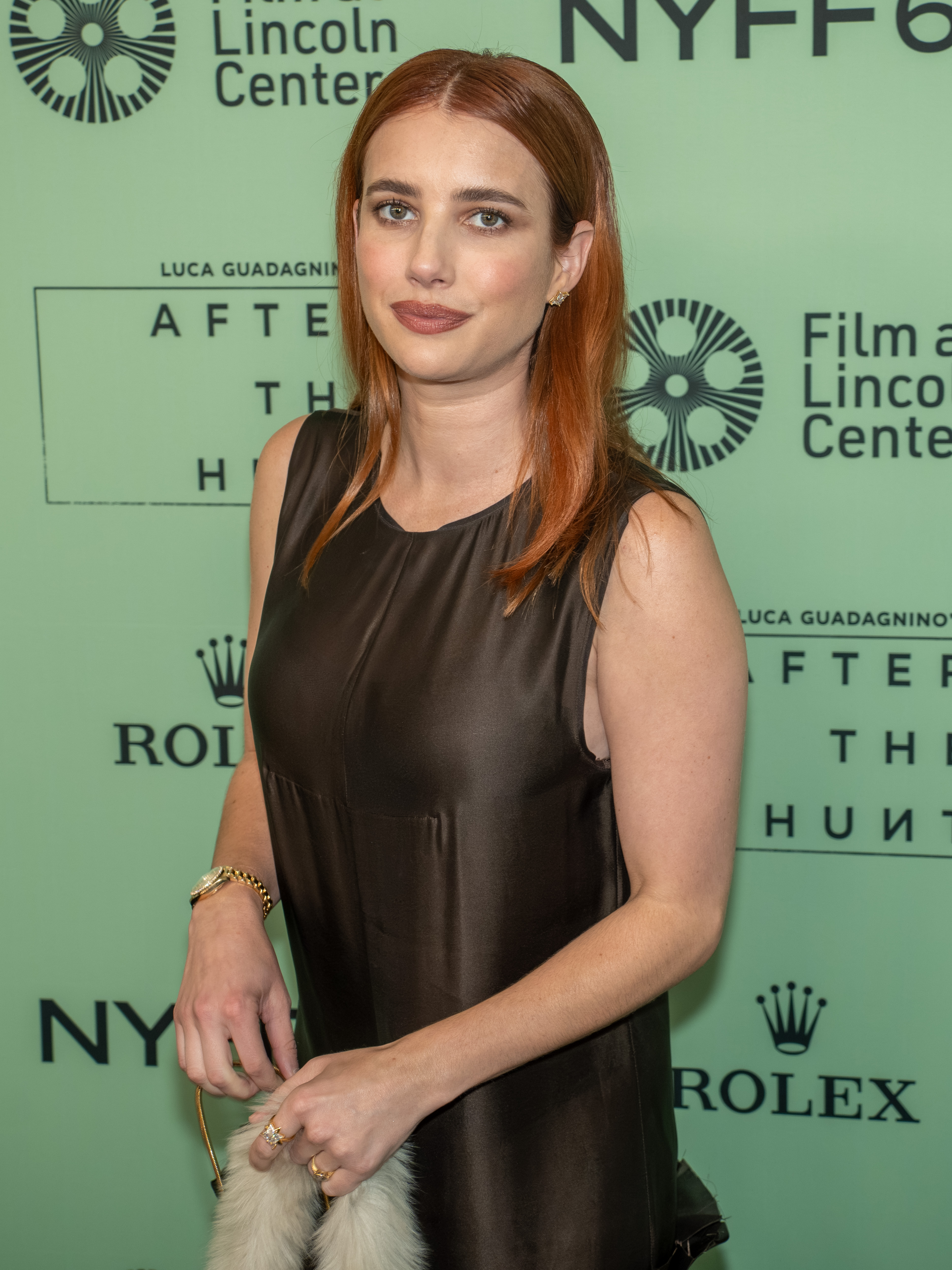
Emma Roberts

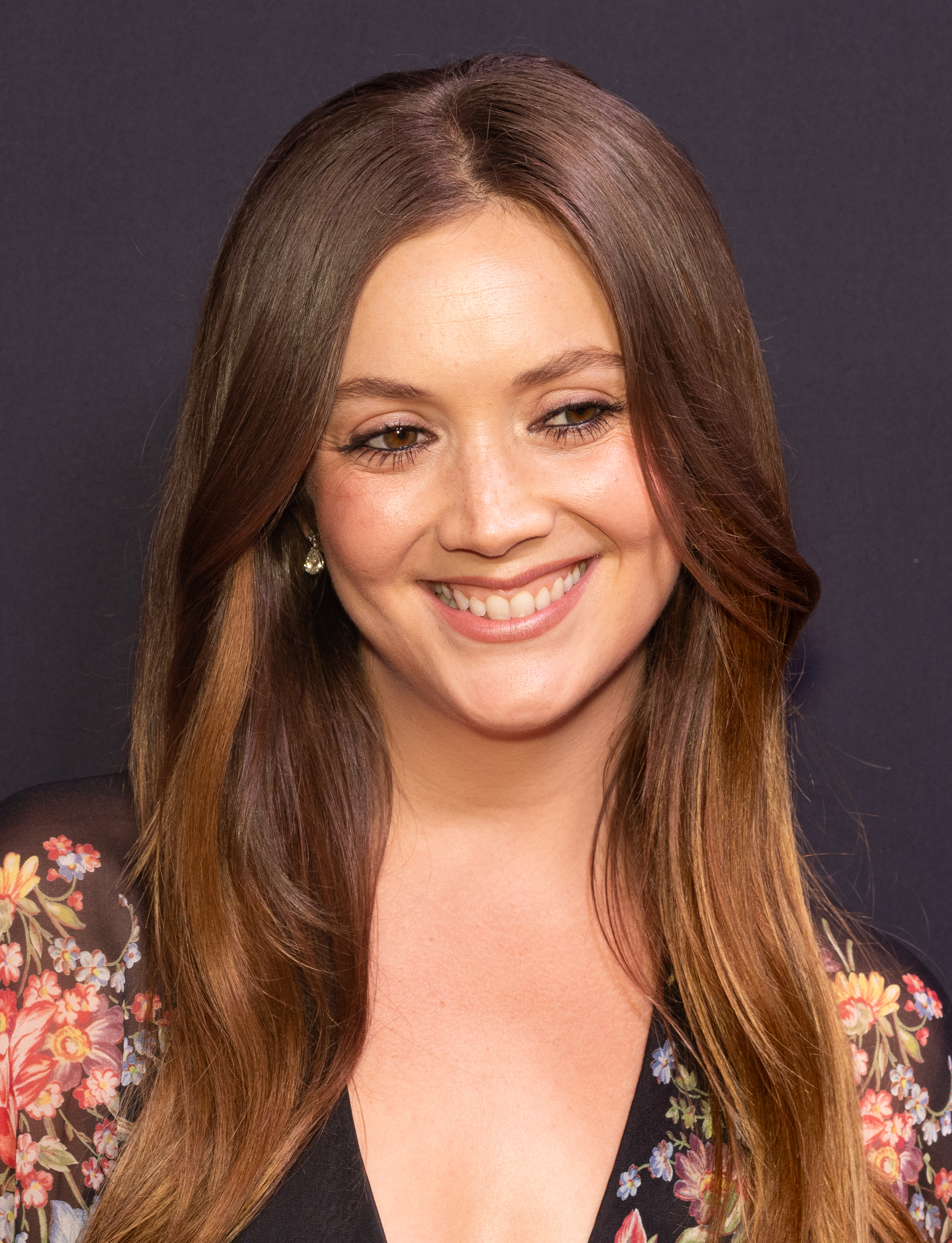
Billie Lourd

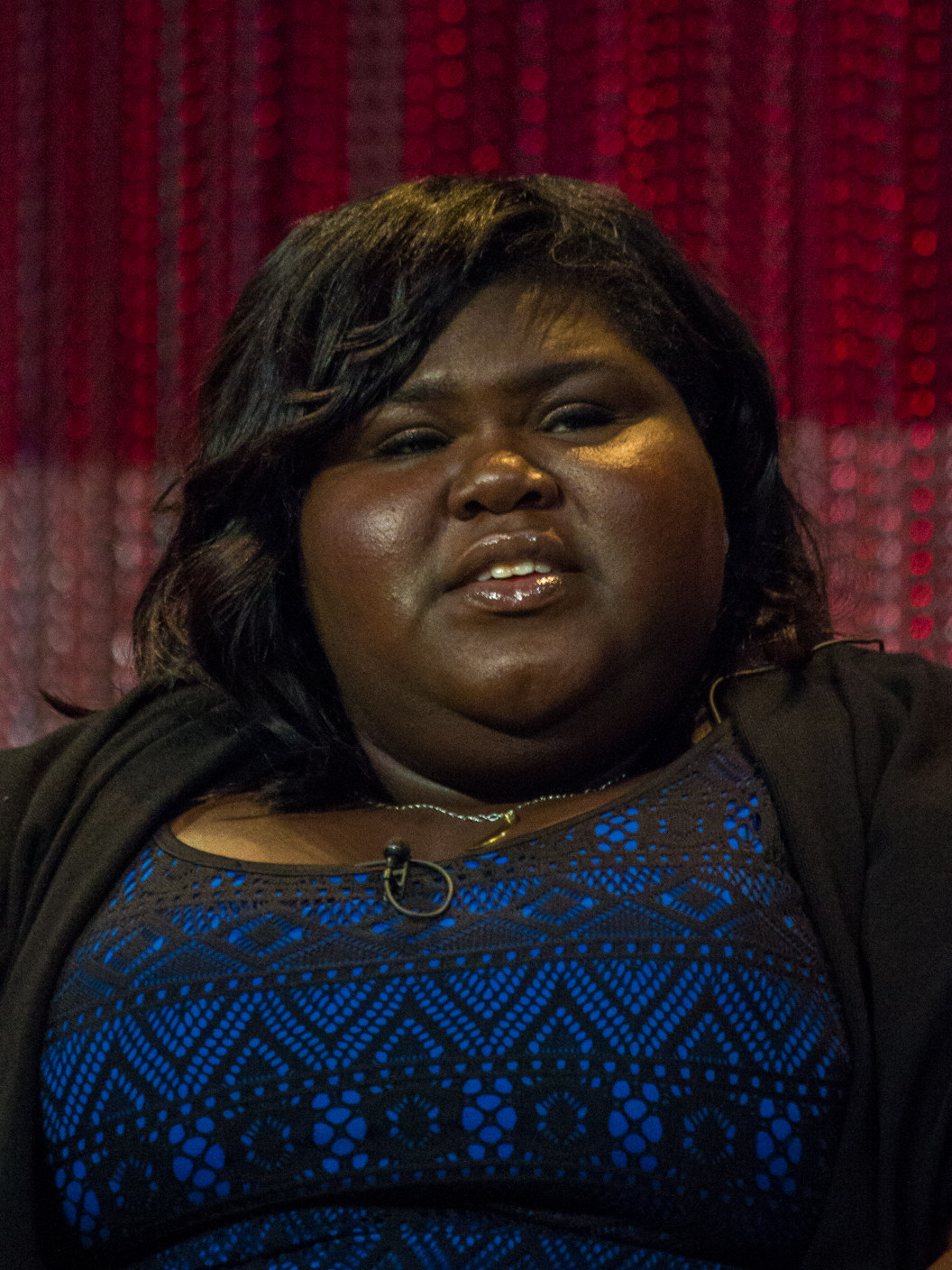
Gabourey Sidibe

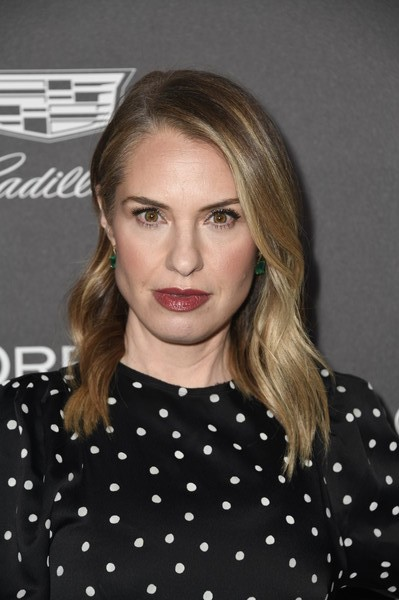
Leslie Grossman

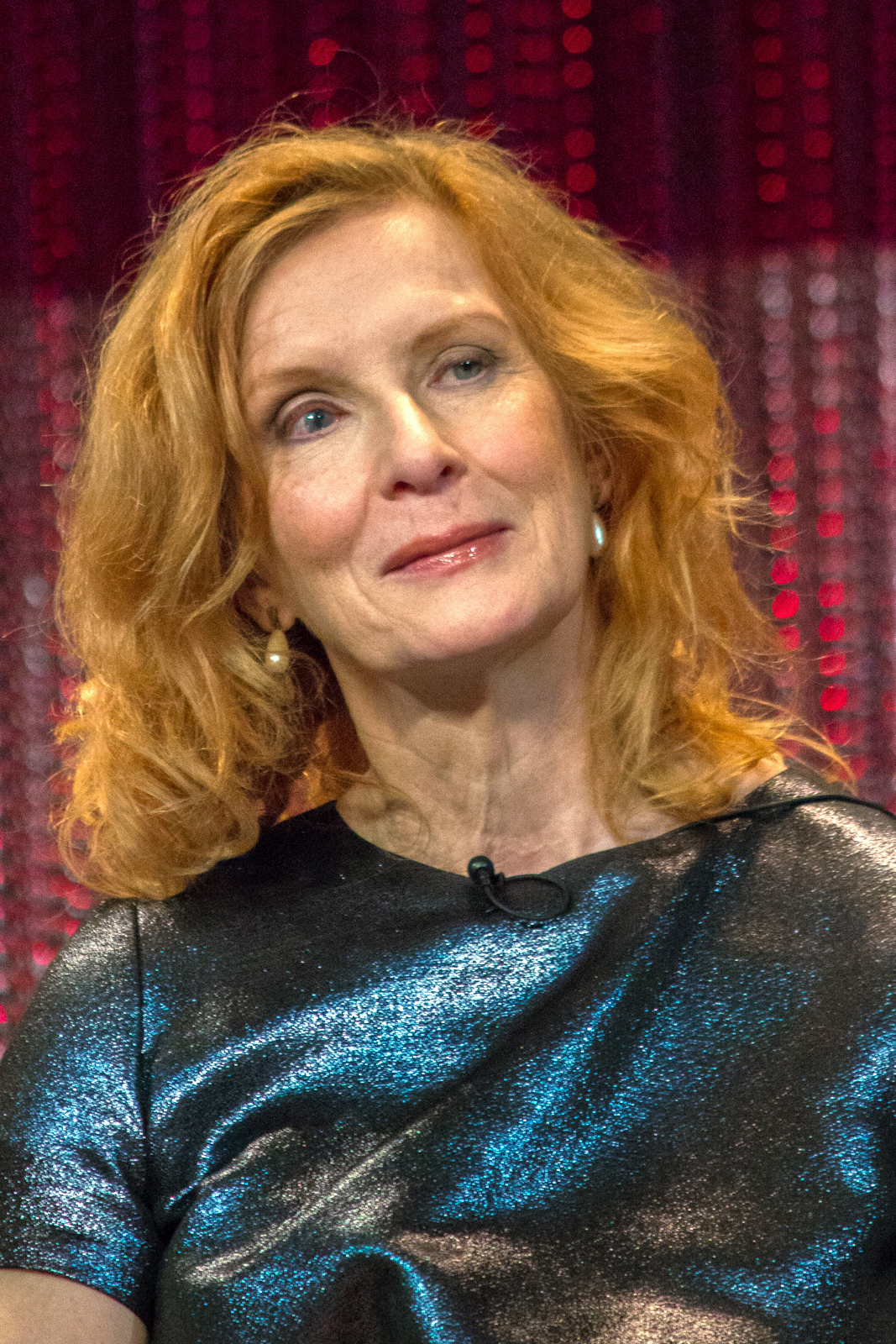
Frances Conroy

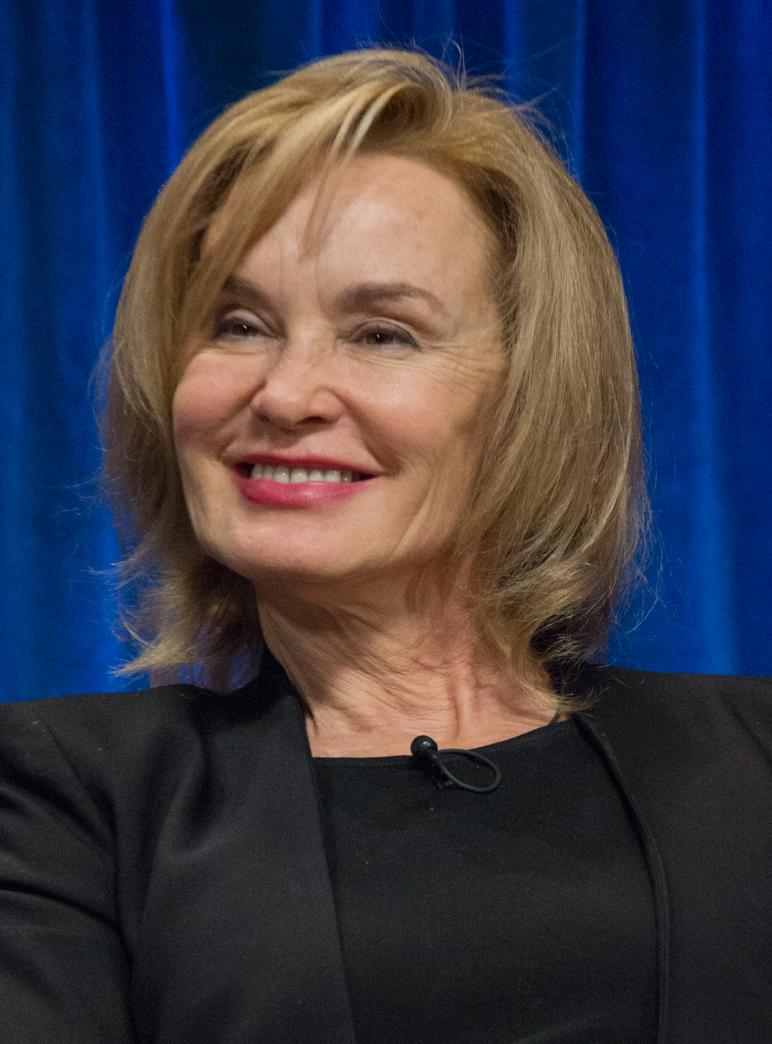
Jessica Lange

- Sarah Paulson as:
  - Cordelia Goode, the Supreme of the witch Coven, reprising her role from Coven and Apocalypse
  - Ms. Wilhemina Venable, a tyrannical matriarch, reprising her role from Apocalypse
  - Sally McKenna, a junkie from the Hotel Cortez, reprising her role from Hotel
  - Mamie Eisenhower, a former First Lady of the United States, reprising her role from Death Valley
  - Tuberculosis Karen, a homeless artist with tuberculosis, from Provincetown, Massachusetts, reprising her role from Red Tide
- Evan Peters as:
  - Kai Anderson, a cult leader, reprising his role from Cult
  - Tate Langdon, a teenager, reprising his role from Murder House and Apocalypse
  - James Patrick March, a serial killer from the Hotel Cortez, reprising his role from Hotel and Apocalypse
- Angela Bassett as Marie Laveau, a Louisiana Voodoo queen, reprising her role from Coven and Apocalypse
- Kathy Bates as Delphine LaLaurie, a socialite from New Orleans, reprising her role from Coven and Apocalypse
- Emma Roberts as Madison Montgomery, a witch, reprising her role from Coven and Apocalypse
- Billie Lourd as:
  - Winter Anderson, Kai's sister, reprising her role from Cult
  - Mallory, a witch and future Supreme, reprising her role from Apocalypse
- Gabourey Sidibe as Queenie, a witch, reprising her role from Coven, Hotel and Apocalypse
- Leslie Grossman as Coco St. Pierre Vanderbilt, a witch, reprising her role from Apocalypse
- Frances Conroy as Myrtle Snow, a witch, reprising her role from Coven and Apocalypse (Note: Conroy is listed as part of the main cast only in the episodes in which she appears.)
- Joey Pollari as Benjamin "Ben" DeSoto, a hospice caretaker with triskaidekaphobia
- Jessica Lange as:
  - Constance Langdon, Tate and Adelaide's mother, reprising her role from Murder House and Apocalypse
  - Elsa Mars, a manager of a freak show, reprising her role from Freak Show
  - Margaret Thatcher, a former Prime Minister of the United Kingdom
  - Fiona Goode, the former Supreme of the witch Coven, reprising her role from Coven
  - Sister Judy "Jude" Martin, a Briarcliff patient and former head nun in charge, reprising her role from Asylum

=== Recurring ===
- Avantika Vandanapu as Ophelia, a young advanced witch
- Elle Chapman as Ashley, a plane crash survivor
- Berto Colón as Joe the Doorman
- Fedor Steer as Mr. Taylor Dorium Nas, an elderly gentleman being cared for by Constance and Ben
  - Paul Anthony Kelly as young Nas
- John Waters as Mr. Phibes, a mysterious phlebotomist
- Jamie Brewer as:
  - Adelaide Langdon, Constance's daughter, reprising her role from Murder House
  - Nan, a witch, reprising her role from Coven and Apocalypse
- Mena Suvari as Elizabeth Short, a ghost of an aspiring actress, reprising her role from Murder House and Apocalypse
- Alex Consani as Morwenna, a young witch
- Seth Gabel as Jeffrey Dahmer, a serial killer, reprising his role from Hotel
- Zach Villa as Richard Ramirez, a serial killer, reprising his role from 1984 (Note: Richard Ramirez previously appeared in Hotel, in a storyline continued in 13, portrayed by Anthony Ruivivar. Villa portrayed Ramirez in a different storyline in 1984.)
- Orlando Jones as Papa Legba, a gatekeeper of the spirit world; Jones replaces Lance Reddick, who portrayed Papa Legba in Coven and Apocalypse

=== Guest ===
- Madelaine Petsch as Kira, Ben's girlfriend
- Melanie Nicholls-King as Gwyn, a therapist
- John Carroll Lynch as Twisty the Clown, a disgraced clown and a serial killer, reprising his role from Freak Show and Cult
- Tig Notaro as Ricochet, a clown school teacher
- Mat Fraser as Paul the Illustrated Seal, a freak show member with phocomelia, reprising his role from Freak Show
- Adina Verson as Nina
- Elizabeth Paige as Helen
- Daniel Dale as a tattoo artist
- Terry Sweeney as Warlock Weathersby
- Megan Hill as a JC Penney's customer
- Andy Mientus as a roughneck
- John Blake as Smitty
- Gabriel Robles as roughneck
- Joe Messina as Brutus
- Grace Dumdaw as NYC witch

== Episodes ==
No. overall	No. in season	Title	Directed by	Written by	Original release date	Prod. code
133	1	"13"	Ryan Murphy	Ryan Murphy & Brad Falchuk	September 24, 2026	DATS01
Ben DeSoto, a hospice caretaker with triskaidekaphobia, reluctantly agrees to join his girlfriend Kira on her 13-themed birthday trip after she threatens to break up with him. However, during the flight, a violent storm causes the plane to break apart. Meanwhile, at Miss Robichaux's Academy, (Note: As seen in American Horror Story: Coven.) Supreme witch Cordelia Goode tells longtime coven member Madison Montgomery that she senses danger approaching as the storm reaches the school. In New York City, Constance Langdon (Note: As seen in American Horror Story: Murder House.) cares for an 87-year-old man named Mr. Nas. As the storm intensifies, the man vomits a thick black liquid. A month later, Ben is assigned as Mr. Nas's nighttime caregiver, who lives on the 13th floor of the residential building, The Apollyon. Constance recognizes him from a news report of the plane crash, which Ben notes that only he and another passenger survived. Constance makes Ben give Mr. Nas a sponge bath, where she specifically instructs him to wash his nipples, urethra, and anus. Later that night, unable to find Mr. Nas, Ben returns to his room to discover the old man lying next to him in bed.
134	2	"1:13 AM"	Crystle Roberson Dorsey	Ned Martel & Charlie Carver	September 24, 2026	DATS02
After explaining how he got into his bed, Constance clarifies to Ben that Mr. Nas is not in a vegetative state but rather suffers from Lewy body dementia, meaning he can still walk on his own. Ben's concerns grow when, while bathing Mr. Nas, he notices two horns forming on his head and a small tail moving in the water, but Constance dismisses him and talks about realizing her purpose was to care for others after her husband's affair with a maid. When Ben asks what happened to the maid, she bluntly replies that she shot her in the eye, (Note: As seen in the Murder House episode "Murder House".) disturbing him. Meanwhile, Twisty the Clown (Note: As seen in American Horror Story: Freak Show.) kills the 13 attendees at a clown school class, including the teacher. That night, Ben abruptly wakes up at 1:13 AM and watches Mr. Nas standing by the window while the same black liquid pours from his mouth. On the 13th night after Jesus was born, Constance hosts a holiday party with her children, Tate and Adelaide, alongside former cult leader Kai Anderson (Note: As seen in American Horror Story: Cult.) and his sister, Winter, who brings an additional mysterious guest: a woman wearing a mask that resembles the one Adelaide wore when she died. (Note: As seen in the Murder House episode "Halloween".)
135	3	"Rauhnacht"	Crystle Roberson Dorsey	Ned Martel & Charlie Carver	September 24, 2026	DATS03
The mysterious guest is revealed to be aspiring actress Elizabeth Short, who died in the Murder House in 1947. (Note: As seen in the Murder House episode "Spooky Little Girl".) Elizabeth claims she does not know where or who she is. Constance helps her remember she was murdered, and then tells her she soon will be "among 13 leading ladies as legendary as her". Ben arrives at The Apollyon and sees the doorman, Joe, holding two aggressive dogs on a leash. He interrupts the party, much to Constance's disdain, who instructed him not to come on his day off. He questions her negligence in caring for Mr. Nas by throwing a party and smoking. In response, she drugs him, causing him to pass out. Tate asks her if he should "take care of him", but she says no. Later, Constance invites Elizabeth to go to a speakeasy named Club Hell with Tate, Kai, Winter, and Adelaide. This speakeasy turns out to be underneath The Apollyon, where they encounter different people wearing black cloaks. Among them is former Outpost 3 resident Ms. Wilhemina Venable, (Note: As seen in American Horror Story: Apocalypse.) who describes the place as the "portal to Hell". They proceed to cover Elizabeth with a red cloak.
136	4	"Is That All There Is?"	Alfonso Gomez-Rejon	Ned Martel & Charlie Carver	October 1, 2026	DATS04
Ben awakens to find Mr. Nas pouring the black liquid from his mouth into a goblet. Suddenly, he levitates toward the old man, who forces him to drink it. Ben then sees a younger version of Mr. Nas, who tells him that "it only hurts if he fights it". Underneath The Apollyon, former TV star Fräulein Elsa Mars announces the participants in a sacrificial ritual as Mr. Nas's "favorite bad girls". The others proceed to throw the next 12 women into the portal: Sally McKenna, (Note: As seen in American Horror Story: Hotel.) Eva Braun, Wallis Simpson, Ayn Rand, Brigitte Bardot, Catherine the Great, Mamie Eisenhower, Elena Ceaușescu, Jezebel, Tuberculosis Karen, (Note: As seen in American Horror Story: Double Feature.) Margaret Thatcher, and Elizabeth. Realizing they are one short, Venable sacrifices herself by jumping in. Later, Constance and phlebotomist Mr. Phibes make Ben believe everything he saw was a dream. They then discuss their motivations behind helping Mr. Nas: Phibes reveals Mr. Nas promised him a filmmaking career, while Constance explains she made a pact with him to resuscitate her children in return. Phibes reveals the 13 sacrifices elevated the biomarkers in Mr. Nas's blood, and once they reach a hundred, he will rise. Noting the count is now at 96, Phibes exclaims, "Hail Satan!"
137	5	"Date Night"	Jesse Peretz	Ned Martel & Charlie Carver	October 1, 2026	DATS05
Ben receives a message from Ashley, Kira's friend and the other plane crash survivor, asking to hang out. Over dinner at his apartment, they discuss their shared trauma, but Ben gets upset when Ashley expresses relief that Kira is dead. Ashley suggests watching Ocean's Thirteen, distressing Ben, who opens up about his triskaidekaphobia. To his surprise, she shares that she suffers from it too, stemming from the COVID-19 pandemic when she was the sole survivor of a luau-themed wedding massacre where 13 guests were killed by the Piggyman. (Note: As seen in American Horror Story: Roanoke.) Ben then reveals the origin of his own phobia: his mother died during childbirth, and he was raised with the help of a church community and his father, who was killed in a car crash while driving an injured neighbor to the hospital. His blood alcohol level was 0.13%. After moving through six foster homes, Ben grew attached to a mother figure named Martha, but she later died of pancreatic cancer on his 13th birthday. Ashley then kisses Ben, and they sleep together. The next morning, while showering, Ben discovers the number 616 marked on his lower back.
138	6	"The Return of Devil's Night"	Crystle Roberson Dorsey	Ned Martel & Charlie Carver	October 1, 2026	DATS06
The sadistic Hotel Cortez owner James Patrick March recruits fellow serial killer Jeffrey Dahmer on a mission to Miss Robichaux's Academy on orders from Mr. Nas, who has seemingly brought both back to life. At the school, Cordelia tests young witch Morwenna's abilities, alongside fellow coven members socialite Coco St. Pierre Vanderbilt, powerful witch Mallory, human voodoo doll Queenie, and Madison. Impressed yet concerned about Morwenna's growing powers, Cordelia fears these are signs of an impending evil she cannot fight. Cordelia suggests seeking guidance from her deceased mother, former Supreme Fiona Goode. The witches summon Fiona via a spirit board. After sensing her presence, Cordelia asks the others to leave her alone with Fiona. Suddenly, Mr. March breaches the school and threatens Cordelia with a sickle. She uses her magic to stab him with it, but he instantly heals. Joined by Dahmer, other serial killers from March's Devil's Night guest list (Note: As seen in the Hotel episode "Devil's Night".) appear: the masked Zodiac Killer and devil worshipper Richard Ramirez, (Note: As seen in American Horror Story: 1984.) who violently forces himself on another witch, Ophelia. When Cordelia attempts to save her, March uses the distraction to throw the sickle at her, fatally stabbing her in the head.
139	7	"The Baddest Witch of Them All"	Alfonso Gomez-Rejon	Ned Martel & Charlie Carver	October 8, 2026	DATS07
As March waits and Mallory watches over Cordelia, the remaining witches fight the other killers. Madison and Queenie confront Dahmer; Dahmer gains the upper hand and stabs Madison. While Morwenna heals Madison, Queenie chews off her own skin to injure Dahmer. A recovered Madison then conjures flames to burn Dahmer to death. Queenie and Coco track down the Zodiac Killer and combine their abilities to transfer fatal ketoacidosis into him. Mallory pursues Ramirez, who is in the midst of tormenting Ophelia. Ophelia telekinetically forces Ramirez onto the ceiling, and Mallory psychically sends him back in time to 1985, where he is beaten to death by an angry mob, thus also killing him in the present. Fiona arrives and effortlessly defeats March; she revives the other three killers, forces them to stab March to death, and kills them again. She then resurrects Cordelia.
140	8	"Hell No"	Crystle Roberson Dorsey	Ned Martel & Charlie Carver	October 8, 2026	DATS08
As Cordelia recuperates, she and Fiona struggle to reach common ground—a remorseful Fiona wants to make amends for neglecting Cordelia, while Cordelia is merely interested in deducing how to defeat Satan and avert the oncoming catastrophe as soon as possible. Cordelia and the other witches cut open the bodies of the killers, from which Mr. Nas's black liquid as well as a serpent emerge. Having spent years in Hell, Fiona admits that the only way to defeat the Devil is to "befriend the Devil's friend". Queenie reluctantly transports Cordelia to the gates of Hell, where she meets with Papa Legba, a spiritual gatekeeper who is unaware of Fiona's resurrection. Cordelia returns with him to the land of the living, where she and the other witches negotiate with him to learn how to defeat the Devil. Papa Legba agrees on the condition that the witches resurrect voodoo priestess Marie Laveau. However, this requires another soul to enter Hell in exchange, so Queenie volunteers, ending up in a personalized Hell in which she encounters and humiliates socialite Delphine LaLaurie. The witches resurrect Marie, who agrees to an uneasy alliance with them at Papa Legba's insistence.
141	9	"The Devil Is in the Details"	Adam Penn	Ryan Murphy & Ned Martel & Charlie Carver	October 15, 2026	DATS09
Constance confronts Mr. Nas with a list of demands for his vision of the future, including placing her children in positions of power. He agrees, but mocks her for believing she has power over him. When she asks why he chose her despite her belief that she is a good person, he responds by listing the various misdeeds and crimes she committed over the years. She requests to rule by his side; he declines and reveals he is actually her father. Meanwhile, Ben suddenly recovers memories of a Satanic ritual, overseen by Mr. Nas, that he witnessed as a child. From a prescription filled by "Taylor Dorium Nas", Ben unscrambles the letters to reveal "I'm your Lord Satan". A concerned Ashley seeks out Constance, revealing they are working together. Ben confronts Mr. Nas, who offers to explain their shared history.
142	10	"The Prodigal Son"	Gillian Robespierre	Ned Martel & Charlie Carver & Brad Falchuk	October 15, 2026	DATS10
Marie and the other witches cast a privacy spell that allows Papa Legba to reveal the history of Satan's ascent. In 1939, Pope Pius XII learned of a bet between God and Satan that would allow Satan to control Heaven, Hell, and the Earth if he survived for 100 years in human form. However, Pius mistakenly believed Adolf Hitler to be possessed by Satan. Mr. Nas thus began his aging in secret, using the sacrifice of 13 women to speed up the aging process. Papa Legba reveals that the only way to defeat Satan is to prevent Satan's only son from bending to Satan's influence. Mallory admits to using time travel to kill Michael Langdon (Note: As seen in the Apocalypse episode "Apocalypse Then".)—the Antichrist—and Fiona reveals Mallory's destiny as the next Supreme. Meanwhile, Mr. Nas admits to being Ben's father and giving him the 616 branding, and offers Ben unlimited power and pleasure in exchange for becoming his protégé. Ben travels to Miss Robichaux's Academy, telling the witches that he is aware they are pursuing him.
143	11	"Madison's Happy Ending"	Adam Penn	Ned Martel & Charlie Carver & Ryan Murphy	October 22, 2026	DATS11
Ben, now demonstrating supernatural abilities, expresses his intention to help the witches defeat Mr. Nas. He reveals he accepted Mr. Nas's pact as a way of gaining more knowledge about him. To prove his allegiance to the skeptical witches, he summons their former ally Myrtle Snow to the academy, having rescued her from Hell. Meanwhile, Madison narrates about her difficulty finding love over the years, leading her to freeze her eggs three months prior, though only one could be retrieved. She and Ben develop a mutual attraction, and he transports them to a restaurant in Italy, where he reveals that he killed Ashley after discovering her deception. Madison and Ben have sex, after which they discuss if either of them can truly be "good", with Ben wondering if Madison is God's way of tempting him away from Satan.
144	12	"Sisters in Arms"	Gillian Robespierre	Ned Martel & Charlie Carver	October 22, 2026	DATS12
Myrtle reveals to Fiona that she is the daughter of Satan, and the identical twin sister of Constance. She further explains that Fiona's mother was Judy Martin, a nun and one-time overseer of the Briarcliff Manor asylum who was institutionalized and driven insane after committing various crimes; (Note: As seen in American Horror Story: Asylum.) Mr. Nas later visited her in Briarcliff and impregnated her. Fiona and Constance then meet for the first time. Constance expresses frustration and jealousy in her inability to cast magic, and Fiona offers to teach her. Marie reveals the same family history to Cordelia, while the two are in the midst of creating a potion. Ben urges her to speed up the process, and rescues Queenie from Hell to assist her. Marie explains that her potion is designed to split Mr. Nas's soul, allowing the witches to absorb his life force and trap him in the body of a baby. Ben, Cordelia, and Queenie travel to the Apollyon to perform the ritual, but they are ambushed by Mr. Nas, Tate, and Phibes, who kill Queenie and Cordelia.
145	13	"Devil of a Good Time"	Crystle Roberson Dorsey	Ned Martel & Charlie Carver & Brad Falchuk	October 29, 2026	DATS13
Phibes lures a group of 13 young men to the Apollyon in an attempt to use them as sacrifices for Mr. Nas. However, Mr. Nas refuses them, kills his now 99.9-year-old human form, and executes Phibes. He visits Cordelia, who is languishing in a Hell where she is forced to euthanize dogs. Satisfied with his victory and having lost interest in the human world, he returns her to life; she reunites with Queenie, who was saved by Ben. Cordelia returns to the academy to see Mallory send herself back in time to prevent the Salem witch trials. Meanwhile, after sex with Ben, Madison instantly becomes pregnant and gives birth to a baby girl, overseen by Mr. Nas. Mallory soon returns, claiming to have learned a new spell that can defeat Mr. Nas. Cordelia and Mallory summon Ben; they inform him he is the 13th Antichrist, and he must willingly sacrifice himself to defeat his father. Mr. Nas arrives to stop them, but Ben completes the ritual by stabbing himself with an enchanted dagger and trapping Mr. Nas's soul in The Last Supper. Cordelia and Mallory vow to watch over it and prevent his return.

== Production ==
=== Background and theme ===
On January 9, 2020, American Horror Story was renewed for up to a thirteenth season. On December 5, 2018, Ryan Murphy said the witches from Coven would return in a future season. On July 28, 2026, Murphy announced in an interview with Entertainment Tonight that the season, officially titled 13, would consist of 13 episodes, and while the season would revisit Coven, it was not a direct sequel. He described it as an Avengers-style crossover between "all the seasons", with characters coming together "to defeat the ultimate evil", and added that he spent years writing it. Leslie Grossman explained that the series was set in one universe with different timelines, which "intersect in a way that makes sense".

The theme of the number 13 was announced alongside the title. The show's official FX page for the season reads: "FX's American Horror Story ... returns for an unrivaled 13th installment that will do justice to everyone's most feared number. ... Which iconic horrors will return to haunt the hallowed halls of 13 and what new terrors await? Light your candles, draw your pentagrams and prepare for a supreme surprise."

In August 2026, Murphy revealed he would direct an episode, for the first time since "Checking In" (2015). In September 2026, he said that the crossover with Scream Queens was planned to be included in the season, but it was scrapped after the departure of Ariana Grande, who was supposed to reprise her role as Chanel #2.

=== Casting ===
In February 2025, Jessica Lange, who starred in the first four seasons and briefly appeared in Apocalypse (2018), answered a question about her potential return for the thirteenth season: "Oh Christ, no. I mean, I haven't done it for more than 10 years, 12 years, so, no, I'm not doing it." Murphy revealed that Lange was the first person he turned to about the return and she agreed under the condition she would have a musical number. She revealed she was not interested in portraying new characters and considered coming back only for reprising her previous characters. Subsequently, Murphy turned to Sarah Paulson and Evan Peters, who agreed instantly. They both last appeared in Double Feature (2021).

In October 2025, Lange, Paulson, Peters, Emma Roberts, Billie Lourd, Kathy Bates, Angela Bassett, Leslie Grossman, Jessica Lange, and Gabourey Sidibe were all confirmed to return for the thirteenth season, along with the newcomer Ariana Grande. Bates, Bassett and Sibide last appeared in Apocalypse. Bates revealed that she would have only one day of filming. In February 2026, John Waters joined the cast, while Joey Pollari joined in April, and Alex Consani and Paul Anthony Kelly joined in May. John Carroll Lynch and Matt Fraser were also confirmed to reprise their roles from Freak Show, with Mena Suvari and Berto Colón also joining the cast. In July, Frances Conroy was confirmed to reprise her role from Coven, with Avantika Vandanapu and Grace Dumdaw also joining the cast. In July 2026, it was reported that Grande dropped out due to scheduling conflicts with the season's production schedule and her Eternal Sunshine Tour. In August, Jamie Brewer, Elle Chapman, Seth Gabel, Orlando Jones, Tig Notaro, Madelaine Petsch, Fedor Steer, and Zach Villa were confirmed as part of the cast.

Murphy revealed that Paulson was set to play six to seven roles, while Peters was set to play five characters. Paulson revealed that a storyline with their Asylum characters, Lana Winters and Kit Walker, was planned, but it was scrapped because Peters did not want to do the accent again. Lange reprised all four of her characters from the first four seasons, and confirmed having a musical number as Elsa Mars. She also teased portraying a fifth undisclosed character, later revealed as Margaret Thatcher, which was her idea to be included in a storyline. Moreover, she recorded a cover of Peggy Lee's "Is That All There Is?" for the fourth episode.

=== Filming ===
The season began filming in April 2026. In July 2026, the cast was spotted filming in SoHo, Manhattan. Filming concluded on July 27, 2026.

== Release ==
=== Marketing ===
In July 2026, promotional ice cream trucks themed around American Horror Story: 13 were installed at San Diego Comic-Con. On August 12, 2026, Vogue published the first production stills. The first trailer was released the following day. The second trailer was released on September 10, 2026. On October 8, 2026, Lou Eyrich, Murphy, Falchuk, Lange, Paulson, Lourd, Sidibe and Grossman participated in a season's panel at the PaleyFest.

=== Broadcast and streaming ===
American Horror Story: 13 premiered at the Hotel Chelsea in New York City on September 23, 2026. On September 24, 2026, the season premiered on FX in the United States. The first two weeks are set to feature three episodes each, while the following weeks will feature two episodes at a time. The finale was broadcast on its own on October 29. The season was also released on Hulu in the United States and internationally on Disney+. In Canada, Australia and the United Kingdom the episodes are set to premiere on Disney+ the day after the broadcast in the United States.

=== Podcast ===
On September 24, 2026, the accompanying four-episode video podcast, AHS: 13 Official Podcast, premiered on Hulu, Disney+, YouTube and podcast servies. Produced by FX in partnership with At Will Media, it features cast members and creatives interviewing one another, with new episodes released alongside the season premiere.

== Reception ==
=== Critical response ===
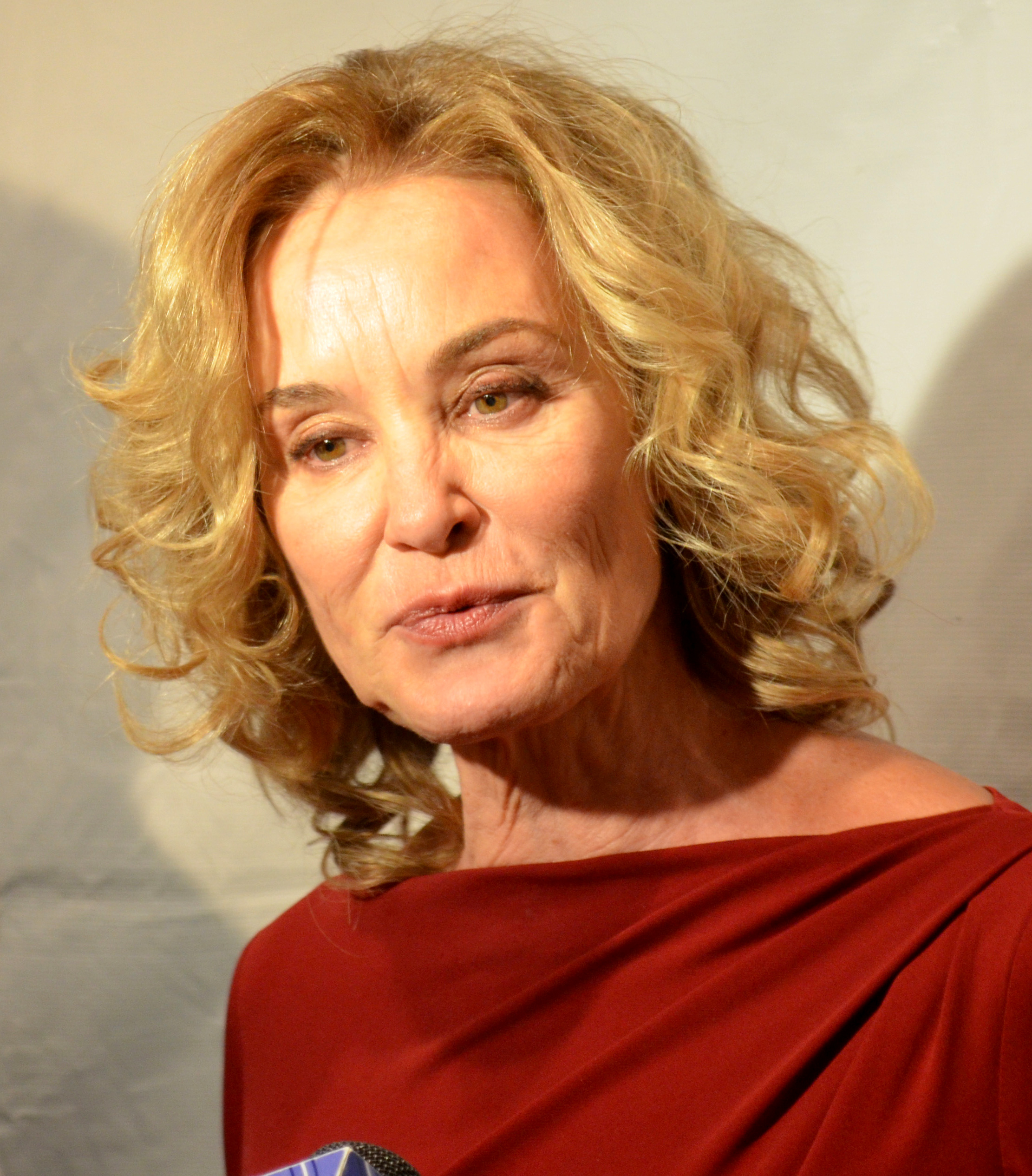
Jessica Lange received critical acclaim for her performance

On the review aggregator website Rotten Tomatoes, 55% critics' reviews are positive, with an average rating of 5.7/10, based on 11 reviews. Metacritic, which uses a weighted average, assigned a score of 58 out of 100 based on 4 critics, indicating "mixed or average" reviews.

Slate's J. Bryan Lowder deemed the season a "relieving return to form", adding "the writers have finally tuned back into the mix of camp and the grotesque that made the golden era so good". Michel Ghanem of TheWrap called the season a "beautifully puzzling ode to superfans". He highlighted the performance of Jessica Lange, calling her "as good as ever, scene-stealing through snippy lines and entertaining monologues, brightening up a slow start to the season". Writing for Radio Times, Louise Griffin deemed it "hellishly flawed but still fiendishly fun", feeling that the series "has reached its pinnacle – not, certainly, in quality, but in terms of pure spectacle". Similarly, she highlited Lange, commenting: "it's a delight to once again relish in the devilry of one of [the series'] best creations."

Vulture's Jen Chaney felt that watching the season "feels more than ever like being stuck in some sort of hell", arguing it delivered the "most incoherent debut in [the series'] decade-plus of existence". However, she praised Lange, opining she "lends some stability to this narratively shaky material through her performance". Ben Gibbons of Screen Rant criticized the shortening of the episodes compared with previous seasons, arguing that the first three episodes have been "jumping from one narrative to another, trying to create loose connections between them all, but struggling to make one consistent thread that captivates the audience". Writing for Slant Magazine, Michael Savio called the season a "nostalgia-ridden nightmare as mildly engrossing as it is exceedingly gross". He felt that Lange was "mesmerizing any time she's on screen", but when she "isn't holding our attention, these early episodes are borderline incoherent, if not just plain boring".

=== Ratings ===
On FX, American Horror Story: 13 averaged approximately 378,000 same-day viewers for its linear airing on September 24.

On streaming, analytics firm FlixPatrol, which monitors daily updated VOD charts and streaming ratings worldwide, reported that following the season premiere, American Horror Story topped Hulu's chart among all programs and Disney+'s chart among series in the United States. Internationally, it ranked among the top titles on Disney+ in multiple countries, while in Australia it was the most-streamed series on Binge. FX announced that American Horror Story: 13 drew approximately 4 million views worldwide on Hulu and Disney+ during the four days following its September 24 premiere. The figure represented a 50 percent increase over the twelfth season, Delicate, in 2024, and nearly double the viewership of the two preceding season premieres. The premiere was also the biggest launch to date for any show by American Horror Story co-creator and executive producer Ryan Murphy on Hulu and Disney+, excluding shows with next-day streaming releases, such as those he produces for ABC. Nielsen Media Research, which records streaming viewership on certain American television screens, reported that American Horror Story was the second most-streamed acquired series between September 21–27, with 763 million minutes viewed, including 13 accounting for a third of that total. The series subsequently ranked third with 712 million minutes of watch time from September 28–October 4, sixth with 598 million from October 5–11, and ninth with 499 million from October 12–18.

=== Accolades ===
Award	Date of ceremony	Category	Recipient(s)	Result	Ref(s).
Queerties Awards	March 10, 2026	Next Big Thing	American Horror Story: 13	Nominated	
