= Ladies' Night (film) =

Ladies’ Night
- Poster
- Directed by: Gabriela Tagliavini
- Written by: Issa López
- Produced by: Epigmenio Ibarra; Inna Payán
- Starring: Ana de la Reguera; Ana Claudia Talancón; Luis Roberto Guzmán; Fabián Corres
- Production company: Miravista
- Distributed by: Buena Vista International
- Release date: December 10, 2003
- Country: Mexico
- Language: Spanish

Ladies’ Night is a 2003 Mexican film directed by Gabriela Tagliavini. The film is a romantic comedy about two women who find love in modern-day Mexico City.

== Plot ==
Alicia is an apparently conservative woman that is about to marry, but her life takes an unexpected route when in the party before the wedding, she meets Roco, a stripper hired by Ana, a jealous friend of Alicia's boyfriend, to upset her on this very special day.

Surprising everyone (her conservative family, her own boyfriend and even Ana herself), Alicia still decides to follow Roco. The rivalry among Ana and Alicia is thus transformed into a strong friendship, and they both show themselves as very independent women.

== Cast ==
- Ana de la Reguera as Ana
- Ana Claudia Talancón as Alica
- Luis Roberto Guzmán as Roco
- Fabián Corres as Fabián (Alicia's boyfriend)

== Reception ==
Chase Burns of The Stranger said, "All the technology in the film is blocky, and there are animated interludes that remind me of Lizzie McGuire. The stripping sequences are so stupid and colorful. A majority of straight dude viewers will hate this movie, but there’s an audience for it, and I’m a part of it." In a negative review, Variety's Robert Koehler said the film had "a script in desperate need of creative CPR" and "the misadventures of a struggling illustrator wh'’s also a virginal bride-to-be are not enchanting, let alone sexy, and the film's exhausting hyperactivity only underscores the point".
