= Tales from the Town of Widows =

2007 lyrical novel by James Cañón

- Author: James Cañón
- Publisher: Fourth Estate
- Publication date: 2007
- ISBN: 978-0061140389
- OCLC: 77540469

Tales from the Town of Widows is a 2007 lyrical novel written by Colombian-born author James Cañón. It tells the story of Mariquita, a mountain village that is forever altered the day a band of communist guerrillas forcibly recruits all but three of its men. Left to fend for themselves with an ethically challenged priest, a transvestite and a withdrawn gay man, the virtual widows slowly emerge from their supporting roles as wives and daughters to become unwitting founders of a remarkable new society: an all-female utopia far greater than any revolutionary's imagined ideal society. Interspersed with the central narrative are blunt and brutal first-person accounts (each a page and a half long and signaled by an alternate font) that serve as reports on the men. They are all fighting, displaced, or brutally murdered, including left-wing rebels, right-wing paramilitary soldiers, Colombian national army soldiers and the civilians that are caught between all these forces. These are designed to remind the readers of the very unmagical reality the women are rejecting.

The novel was first published in 2007 by HarperCollins NY. Since, it has been published in over twenty countries and translated into French, German, Italian, Dutch, Spanish, Hebrew, Korean, Turkish, Arabic, Croatian and Polish.

== Awards and honors ==
- Prix du Premier Meilleur Roman Étranger, 2008 (Paris)
- Prix des Lecteurs Vincennes, 2008 (Vincennes)
- Finalist, Prix des Lecteurs du Télégramme, 2009 (France)
- Finalist, Edmund White Fiction Award, 2008 (New York)
- Finalist, Lambda Award for Best Debut Fiction, 2008 (Los Angeles)
- Finalist, One Brown Book, One Nation Program, 2008 (U.S.)

== Film adaptation ==
A film adaptation released in 2011, was directed by Gabriela Tagliavini and starred Eva Longoria and Christian Slater. The film was censored in Spain, where all the lesbian scenes have been removed.
