= Skyrunners =

2009 Disney XD original movie

- Film poster
- Written by: Richard C. Okie
- Directed by: Ralph Hemecker
- Starring: Kelly Blatz; Joey Pollari; Linda Kash; Conrad Coates; Jacqueline MacInnes Wood; Nathan Stephenson; Aisha Dee
- Theme music composer: Greg Edmonson
- Countries of origin: United States; Canada
- Original language: English

Production
- Executive producers: Richard C. Okie; Suzanne French
- Producers: Janine Dickins; Peter Bray
- Cinematography: Rob Marsh; Steve Danyluk
- Editors: Lisa Hough; Stephen Lawrence
- Running time: 91 minutes
- Production companies: Ranger Productions; Shaftesbury Services II, Inc.

Original release
- Network: Disney XD
- Release: November 27, 2009

Skyrunners is an American-Canadian science fiction action thriller film that premiered on Disney XD on November 27, 2009. It was the first original film that premiered on the network.

== Plot ==
Teenage brothers 18-year-old Nick and 14-year-old Tyler come across a small UFO when it lands right in front of their truck on an empty road near their town. Soon after evading government agents, mainly Agent Armstrong, and keeping the UFO in seclusion, Tyler undergoes dramatic physical changes and gains superhuman powers due to his dramatic trip into space via the UFO, including enhanced strength and telepathy. The situation becomes even more difficult to cover up considering Tyler is being constantly blown off by Nick, due to Nick's efforts at chasing Julie Gunn, as well as Nick having to make a science project to graduate high school and reptile-like aliens that have begun to appear and pursue Tyler. After having literally no one left to turn to, Tyler decides to tell Agent Armstrong about the UFO. After Agent Armstrong explains to Tyler about the effects that his trip into space had on his body, he shoots the ship with a laser gun, thereby critically damaging it, before he reveals himself to Tyler as one of the aliens in disguise and captures him.

Nick, feeling guilty for constantly doubting and ignoring Tyler, goes to the UFO hideout to apologize, but upon finding Tyler missing and the UFO damaged, he begins an attempt to repair the UFO, which has biological parts. After trying all night, he is successful and the UFO takes him to the hidden caves the aliens have made into their fortress, realizing the entrance is actually an impact crater from the aliens' crash-landing on Earth. Nick locates Tyler and helps him escape his holding cell. The brothers uncover that the aliens are planning to take over Earth by polluting the atmosphere. Tyler uses an alien explosive from the UFO to destroy the aliens and their pollution equipment, and he and Nick escape in the UFO. However, they do not succeed in destroying all the aliens, and they are chased by a surviving one (possibly Armstrong) in a more powerful version of their UFO.

After destroying the alien fighter and its pilot in a high speed, fast-paced dogfight, the UFO crashes at Nick's high school graduation. Nick then uses his fixing of the UFO as his science project, and is allowed to graduate. Nick wins Julie over and they kiss, Tyler gets a date with Katie Wallace and they get to keep the UFO. Assuming that all of the aliens were destroyed, the boys go on with their lives. However, at the end of the movie while taking the UFO for a joy-ride (with its new stereo system that Nick installed which is notably blasting the theme song of the movie, Low Day by Capra), four Agent Armstrongs are seen watching them, revealing at least four of the aliens survived and are plotting another attack on them and the human race, thus leaving the possibility of a sequel.

== Cast ==
- Kelly Blatz as Nick Burns
- Joey Pollari as Tyler Burns
- Linda Kash as Robin Burns
- Conrad Coates as Agent Armstrong
- Jacqueline MacInnes Wood as Julie 'Smoking' Gunn
- Nathan Stephenson as Darryl Butler
- Aisha Dee as Katie Wallace

== Production ==
The film was shot in New Zealand, at Studio West in West Auckland.

== Promotion ==
A teaser trailer for the film was released on DisneyXD.com to promote it. On November 13, the song "Low Day", a song for the movie, aired in world premiere on Radio Disney and Disney XD. The song is performed by Capra, a band that Kelly Blatz is the lead singer of. The song has also been heard in an Expedia commercial.

The film was released on iTunes on November 17, 2009 (ten days before the film's television premiere) and premiered on Disney Channel on January 17, 2010.
