= Carlos Goez =

Bibliophile and Bookseller

- Pomander Book Shop, 1979 (Alex Finlayson)
- Born: December 13, 1939; Medellin, Colombia
- Died: December 25, 1990 (aged 51); New York City
- Occupations: Bibliophile and Classicist

Carlos Goez (December 13, 1939 – December 25, 1990) founded the Pomander Book Shop. The Pomander, as it was known, was "a rather unprepossessing, Dickensian storefront,” located at 252 West 95th Street, on Manhattan's Upper West Side next to the Thalia, one of New York's first repertory movie theaters. Goez opened the Pomander in 1975, first running it with bookseller Timothy Mawson and then with William Hamilton. He named the shop for Pomander Walk, the 1920s Tudoresque apartment complex hidden on West 95th Street where he lived.

A native of Colombia who came to New York to be educated at Columbia University, Goez sold fine and rare volumes in impeccable condition, sponsored readings, and mended and cleaned old books. In a 1997 essay Norman McAfee recalls Goez prospecting for first editions at the Bryn Mawr Bookstore on 79th at York every Thursday morning at 11 am when shipments of old books donated by Bryn Mawr alumni were made available to book-buyers and collectors. His standards were exacting, as was his English, and he did not hesitate to tell customers what they must buy or "offer trenchant commentary on politics and the passing scene." The tiny shop attracted a large following, counting among its patrons writers and bibliophiles such as Darryl Pinckney, Eric Bentley, Susan Sontag, Adrienne Rich, and Robert Payne. It was a "kind of Upper West Side salon that drew literary giants, earnest scholars, and neighborhood eccentrics." Journalist and former Pomander employee, William Hamilton remembers Susan Sontag remarking to Goez, during a sale, that only 11% of New Yorkers actually read the books they buy. Hamilton also remembers Carrie Fisher being a valued customer. Critic and New Yorker writer Louis Menand has memorialized the Pomander as a favorite bookshop from his past which "featured British and American literature and philosophy—my kind of collection." In 1986 Goez sold the Pomander to poet Suzanne Ostro, who eventually was forced to relocate the shop when developers reconfigured West 95th Street. Carlos Goez died in 1990.
