= Guilloume =

Colombian artist

Guilloume Perez
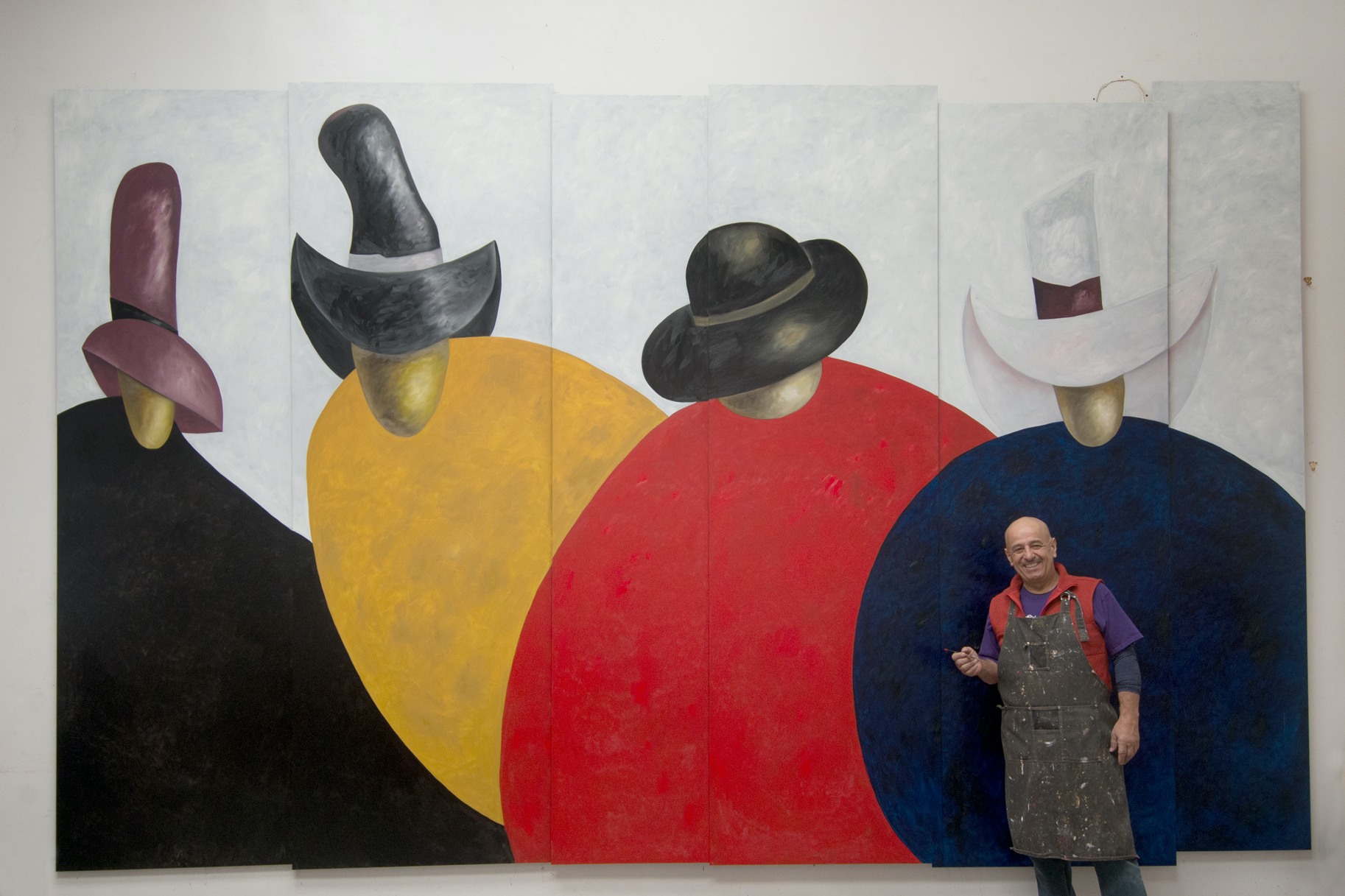
- Perez posing in front of one of his artworks.
- Born: Guilloume Perez; 2 July 1957 (age 69); Medellín, Antioquia, Colombia
- Education: Bellas Artes Fine Arts Institute, Medellin, Colombia 1976-1981 - Formal Art Studies; Apprenticeship in Fine Art in Bronze, Santa Fe, NM 1993-1995 on Lost Wax Technique
- Known for: Painter, Sculptor
- Movement: Minimalism

Guilloume Perez (born July 2, 1957, in Medellín, Antioquia) is a Colombian minimalist artist, self-described master of "Bolismo". His work has been noted by a magazine covering North America's Southwest. He is known primarily for his sculpture and painting.

== Background ==
Born in Colombia in 1957, he dedicated himself to art at an early age and completed formal studies at Bellas Artes Institute in 1981. In his art, he employs oils, watercolors, oil-pastel, pastel, pencil, ink, and, most recently, sculpture in bronze and stone. Guilloume maintains a studio and fine art gallery in Sandia Park near Santa Fe, New Mexico.

== Education ==
- Apprenticeship in Fine Art in Bronze, Santa Fe, NM 1993–1995 on Lost Wax Technique
- Bellas Artes Fine Arts Institute, Medellin, Colombia 1976-1981 - Formal Art Studies

== Exhibitions ==
=== One-man shows, 1976–2020 ===
United States Artistas de Santa Fe (Featured artist), Santa Fe, NM; Desert Art Source, Palm Desert, CA; Naked Horse Gallery, Scottsdale, AZ; Nizhoni Gallery, Albuquerque, NM; Isis On First, Seattle, WA; Jordan Road Gallery, Sedona, AZ; Orchid Gallery, Los Angeles, CA; Camcor Gallery, Los Angeles, CA; Xanadu Gallery, Scottsdale, AZ; Faust Gallery, Santa Fe, NM; Pippin Contemporary, Santa Fe, NM

Colombia Biblioteca Publica Piloto, Medellin; Ideamos Gallery, Medellin; Turantioquia Gallery, Medellin; Hotel Yuldama, Santa Marta; Gallery Fases, Medellin; Turantioquia Gallery, Medellin; Museo Juan Del Corral- Santa Fe De Antioqvia- One Man Show "Ancestors"

Italy Biennale International Arte Contemporaneo - Florence, Italy

Dominican Republic Royal Houses museum, Santo Domingo, Celebrating Abundance One Man Show

== Public art and commissions ==
"Family Gathering": Bronze sculpture, 48" high on a steel base, installed at Clemson University, South Carolina. Commissioned by the Clemson Institute on Family and Neighborhood Life in commemoration of its tenth anniversary.

"Just the Two of Us": Bronze 86"H; installed at the Library of the city of Breckenridge, Colorado.

"Aspiration": Three 36"-high bronze sculptures from an edition of eight purchased by Frank Adams, Chancellor of Cossatot Community College, University of Arkansas.

== Books ==
- Home of the Artist – 2018
- Emotional Connections – 2014
- Guilloume's 33 – Sketches, Paintings, Sculptures, Reliefs (1975–2008), 2009
- Forever – Bronze Reliefs, 2008
- Guilloume — Sketches, 2007
- Guilloume — Sculptures and Paintings, 2003
