= James Cañón =

Colombian-American writer

Colombian-born Author James Cañón (James Canon)

James Cañón is a Colombian-American writer. He's the author of the award-winning Tales from the Town of Widows. Cañón was born and raised in Ibagué, Colombia. He writes fiction primarily, though he has also written essays. His short stories and essays have been published in numerous magazines in the U.S., Belgium and France. He holds an MFA in creative writing from Columbia University.

== Works ==
=== Books ===
Cañón's debut novel, Tales from the Town of Widows, (ISBN 978-0061140389) was originally written in English, his second language. It was first published in the U.S., Canada and the U.K. by HarperCollins in 2007. Praised internationally as "An important contribution to American literature," the novel tells the story of Mariquita, a Colombian village that's forever altered the day a band of communist guerrillas takes out all but three of its men. Left to fend for themselves, the abandoned women slowly emerge from their supporting roles as wives and daughters to become unwitting founders of a radically socialist society, a metamorphosis that Kirkus Reviews has described as "Slyly pushing the envelope that Aristophanes opened with Lysistrata." Cañón's novel has been published in over twenty countries and translated into French, German, Italian, Dutch, Spanish, Hebrew, Korean, Turkish, Arabic, Croatian and Polish. The film adaptation of it, called Without Men, was released in 2011. The cast included Eva Longoria and Chris Slater, and was directed by Gabriela Tagliavini. In 2020 an excerpt from a forthcoming book appeared in Unpublishable, an anthology edited by Chris Molnar from Archway Editions.

=== Essays ===
Se Perdre (et se trouver) dans la Traduction, Les Assises Internationales du Roman 2008 : Le roman, quelle invention ! (Titres)

Andes Féminines, Libération Périodique 2008 : (Libération)

True Brothers, Freud's Blind Spot 2010 : (Simon & Schuster)

Balls Out, The Moment 2012 : (Harper Perennial)

== Awards and honors ==
- Prix du Premier Meilleur Roman Étranger, 2008 (Paris)
- Prix des Lecteurs Vincennes, 2008 (Vincennes)
- Finalist, Prix des Lecteurs du Télégramme, 2009 (Brittany)
- Finalist, Edmund White Fiction Award, 2008 (New York)
- Finalist, Lambda Award for Best Debut Fiction, 2008 (Los Angeles)
- Finalist, One Brown Book, One Nation Program, 2008 (U.S.)
- New York Foundation for the Arts Fiction Fellowship, 2008 (New York)
- Queens Council on the Arts Award, 2008 (New York)
- A School Library Journal's Best Adult Book for High School Students, 2008 (U.S.)
- A Kirkus Reviews’ Top Pick for Reading Groups, 2007 (U.S.)
- Stanford Calderwood Fiction Fellowship, 2007 (New York)
- Urban Artist Initiative Fiction Award, 2006 (New York)
- Finalist, Rolex Mentor and Protégé Arts Initiative, 2002 (Switzerland)
- National Hispanic Foundation for the Arts Award, 2002 & 2001 (U.S.)
- Henfield Foundation Prize for Excellence in Fiction, 2001 (U.S.)
