= Gabriela Tagliavini =

Argentinian film director

- Born: December 29, 1968 (age 57); Buenos Aires, Argentina
- Education: American Film Institute
- Occupations: Filmmaker, screenwriter, novelist
- Known for: Tequila Repasado, Christmas With You, The Devil May Care, Despite Everything, Without Men, Perfect Lover, Ladies' Night
- Website: gabytagliavini.com

Gabriela Tagliavini is an Argentinian writer and director best known for her feature films Tequila Repasado, Christmas With You, Without Men, Perfect Lover, and Ladies' Night, She is a member of the Directors Guild of America (DGA).

Tagliavini has directed five films, two for the box office, two for Netflix, and one for Amazon Prime. She has also worked for Sony, Disney+, Paramount+, Buena Vista, Starz, Voltage, Viacom, VH1, MTV, ABC, and HBO. She has directed actors Sharon Stone, Eva Longoria, Kate del Castillo, Freddie Prinze Jr., Mike Tyson, Billy Zane, and Christian Slater.

In 2022, Christmas With You, secured the number 1 spot on Netflix in 26 countries and achieved a position in the top 10 in 80 countries.

In her 2023 film Tequila Repasado, a workaholic is challenged to outdo an increasing number of his clones when a mystical tequila repeatedly transports him back in time. His mission is to set things right with his family. She directed this film for Sony Pictures and Amazon Studios and it was launched on Amazon Prime worldwide.

== Early life ==
Tagliavini was born in Buenos Aires, Argentina. She received a bachelor's degree in film directing in Argentina and a master's degree in screenwriting from the American Film Institute (AFI).

== Career ==
For her directorial debut, The Woman Every Man Wants (aka Perfect Lover), Tagliavini won the Best Director award at three international film festivals in 2001, including the New York Independent Film Festival and the Munich Film Festival.

Her film Ladies' Night was the top movie in the box office in Mexico in 2004 and won three MTV Movie Awards Mexico. The soundtrack was released by Sony.

Tagliavini's TV film, the Viacom/VH1/MTV/Maverick feature 30 Days Until I'm Famous, premiered on VH1. The film stars Sean Patrick Flanery, Mindy Sterling, Udo Kier and Carmen Electra and was executive-produced by Madonna. Tagliavini's fourth feature as a writer-director, Without Men, starring Eva Longoria and Christian Slater, was released in the U.S. in 2011.

As a screenwriter, she wrote the English remake of the prestigious Luis Buñuel's film Belle de Jour. She adapted the best-selling novel The Anatomist for HBO Films and the screenplay for Cantinflas, a biopic about the Mexican comedian-thespian.

Her fifth feature, Border Run (aka The Mule), starred Sharon Stone and Billy Zane.

She authored Divas, an original pilot, and series bible for Sony. Earlier, she took on the role of director for the pilot and two episodes of the comedy series Claramente on the Claro Video platform.

In addition to directing commercials and television pilots, Tagliavini also worked as a writer and correspondent for CNN. She was a juror at the Berlin Film Festival, and won the prestigious 2006 ABC/DGA directing fellowship, where she worked on shows like Disney's Hannah Montana and Desperate Housewives. Tagliavini helmed a live show, Comedy Rehab, for Comedy Central.

In 2018, Tagliavini successfully pitched a concept to Amazon Studios, securing the opportunity to serve as the showrunner for her own TV series, titled My Problem With Men, with production overseen by former NBC executive Ben Silverman. Additionally, she is currently in the process of developing another TV series with multi-Grammy winner Marc Anthony producing for Viacom/Paramount+.

In television, Tagliavini served as an executive producer, overseeing both the pilot and four episodes of the Warner Brothers TV series Casa Grande, which debuted on Amazon in 2023.

Tagliavini is also the author of a novel, Los Colores de La Memoria, originally published in Spanish in Argentina, then rewritten in English for U.S. readers as The Colors of Memory.

Tagliavini was chosen for the Sundance and WIF's Women Initiative. She received a Life Achievement award from the Baja Film Festival in recognition of her contributions to the industry.

== Awards, nominations, honors ==
- Bogota Film Festival (2004)
  - Nominated, Golden Precolumbian Circle Best Film for Ladies' Night
- Imagen Foundation Awards (2012)
  - Nominated, Imagen Award Best Director/Feature Film for Without Men
- New York International Independent Film & Video Festival (2001)
  - Won, Feature Film Award Best Director for Perfect Lover
- No Dance Film Festival (2001)
  - Won, Best Director for Perfect Lover
- Santa Monica Film Festival (2001)
  - Won, Moxie! Award Best Comedy Feature for Perfect Lover

== Filmography ==
Short film

- Coincidence (1988) (Also production assistant)
- Captain Beto (1991)

Feature film

Year	Title	Director	Writer	Producer	Ref.
2001	Perfect Lover	Yes	Yes	Co-producer	
2003	Ladies' Night	Yes	No	No	
2011	Without Men	Yes	Yes	Executive	
2012	Border Run	Yes	No	No	
2017	How to Break Up with Your Douchebag	Yes	Yes	No	
2019	Despite Everything	Yes	Yes	No	
2022	Christmas With You	Yes	No	No	
2023	Tequila Repasado	Yes	No	No	

Television

Year	Title	Notes
2004	30 Days Until I'm Famous	TV movie
2009	Paul Rodriguez & Friends: Comedy Rehab	TV special
2012	Claramente	12 episodes
2023	Casa Grande	5 episodes

== See also ==
- List of female film and television directors
- List of LGBT-related films directed by women
