= H. Richard Greene =

American stage, television, film, and voice actor

H. Richard Greene (sometimes credited as "Richard Greene") is an American actor.

== Career ==
=== Television roles ===
Greene has appeared in TV shows such as Matlock, According to Jim, Ally McBeal, Boston Legal, Cold Case, The Mentalist, NYPD Blue, Cybill, The Wonder Years, and as Senator Robert Royce on The West Wing.

He also appeared on Mad Men, earning positive reviews for his role.

Greene portrayed "Cary Russell", the name derived from Cary Grant and Jane Russell but the character itself a parody of Bruce Willis's character David Addison in Moonlighting, in the penultimate and controversial episode of Riptide called "If You Can't Beat Em, Join Em" shortly before its cancellation, in part due to being beaten in the ratings by Moonlighting. This episode drew a lot of press attention at the time, with both Entertainment Tonight and the Los Angeles Times running features on the episode. Interestingly enough, he would later appear in the actual Moonlighting as a different character.

=== Film roles ===
He has appeared in several TV movies, including Journey of the Heart (1997), and a few feature films, including a small role in the summer blockbuster Armageddon (1998).

=== Stage roles ===
In his New York City debut, he received critical acclaim as MacDuff in Macbeth with Rip Torn and Geraldine Page. His Broadway credits include The Survivor, Romeo and Juliet, and the international tour of Neil Simon's Brighton Beach Memoirs, directed by Gene Saks. He was a resident member of the Repertory Theatre of Lincoln Center, and portrayed The Headmaster in The Ahmanson's production of The History Boys on the West Coast.

=== Voice roles ===
His voice work includes narrating an episode of the children's TV program, Rugrats.

Greene provided the English voice of Hot Coldman in Metal Gear Solid: Peace Walker and the voice of James Johnson in Metal Gear Solid 2: Digital Graphic Novel.

=== Teaching ===
He is a guest professor at the UCLA School of Theater, Film and Television.

== Personal life ==
He married actress Lynn Milgrim in 1980. The two had recurring roles as Jim and Evelyn Cooper, Winnie Cooper's parents, on The Wonder Years.

== Filmography ==
=== Film ===
Year	Title	Role	Notes
1982	I, the Jury	Gentleman at Bar	
1984	Special Effects	Leon Gruskin	
1987	From the Hip	Wilson	
1998	Armageddon	NASA Tech	
2010	Dante's Inferno: An Animated Epic	King Richard / Socrates	

=== Television ===
Year	Title	Role	Notes
1983	American Playhouse	Bobby Stern	Episode: "Family Business"
1986	Hill Street Blues	Robert Dunlaw	Episode: "Slum Enchanted Evening"
1986	Screen Two	John Rogers	Episode: "Double Image"
1986	Riptide	Cary Russell	Episode: "If You Can't Beat 'Em, Join 'Em"
1986	Fame	Jack Goodman	Episode: "Contacts"
1986	St. Elsewhere	James Moynihan	Episode: "You Beta Your Life"
1986	Hunter	D.A.	Episode: "True Confessions"
1986–1991	L.A. Law	Steven Waering / Mitchell Glazer	3 episodes
1987	Moonlighting	Jake Renborn	Episode: "Poltergeist III – Dipesto Nothing"
1987	Newhart	Mr. Taylor	Episode: "Harris Ankles PIV for Web Post"
1987	Baby Girl Scott	Howard Orrison	Television film
1987	Cracked Up	Coach	Television film
1987	The Hope Division	Captain Thorpe	Television film
1987	J.J. Starbuck	Macadoo	Episode: "Pilot"
1987	The Oldest Rookie	Getz	Episode: "Expert Witness"
1987–1995	Matlock	Various roles	3 episodes
1988	Cagney & Lacey	James Nettles	2 episodes
1988	21 Jump Street	Dr. Freeman	Episode: "Best Years of Your Life"
1988	War and Remembrance	Foxy Davis	Episode: "Part VI"
1988	Police Story: Monster Manor	Lt. Needles	Television film
1988	Highway to Heaven	Travis Hastings / Jim Bradley	4 episodes
1989	Cast the First Stone	Martin Daly	Television film
1989–1990	Paradise	Mr. Stark / Sidney Elkins	3 episodes
1989–1991	The Wonder Years	Mr. Cooper	5 episodes
1990	Equal Justice	Mr. North	Episode: "False Images"
1990	Gabriel's Fire	Jack Grimes	Episode: "Louis's Date"
1990	Over My Dead Body	Moore	Episode: "Dead Air"
1990	Head of the Class	Mr. Finneman	Episode: "My Son the Primate"
1991	Father Dowling Mysteries	Walter Preston	Episode: "The Missing Witness Mystery"
1991	The Great Pretender	Albert Eastlake	Television film
1991	She Stood Alone	Dr. Rufus Adams	Television film
1992	The Boys of Twilight	Sam Parker	Episode: "A Wing and a Prayer"
1992	Brooklyn Bridge	Louis Neiman, Esq.	Episode: "On the Line"
1992	Jonathan: The Boy Nobody Wanted	Wolff	Television film
1992	Quantum Leap	Dr. Hardy	Episode: "Star Light, Star Bright"
1992	Melrose Place	Ken Gable	Episode: "Dreams Come True"
1994	Picket Fences	Mr. Hendricks	2 episodes
1994	Menendez: A Killing in Beverly Hills	Stanley Weisberg	Television film
1996	Chicago Hope	Dr. David Stadson	Episode: "Life Lines"
1996	Voice from the Grave	Dr. Carter	Television film
1996	Moloney	Paul Simms	Episode: "Clueless"
1996, 1998	Cybill	Dr. Drew / Priest	2 episodes
1997	NYPD Blue	Walter Mirren	Episode: "Upstairs, Downstairs"
1997	Diagnosis: Murder	D.A.	Episode: "Murder Two: Part 2"
1997	Journey of the Heart	Doctor	Television film
1997	7th Heaven	Joe	Episode: "Girls Just Want to Have Fun"
1997	Invasion	Sgt. Kinsella	2 episodes
1998	Early Edition	P. Maguire	Episode: "Walk, Don't Run"
1998	The Practice	Judge Paul Stewart	Episode: "Ties That Bind"
1999	The Brothers Flub	Additional voices	Episode: "Scared Stiff/Prehysteria"
1999	Ally McBeal	Judge Paul Stewart	Episode: "Angels and Blimps"
1999	Rugrats	Video Narrator	Episode: "The Jungle/The Old Country"
1999	Snoops	Arthur Plimpton	Episode: "True Believers"
1999, 2000	Time of Your Life	Mr. Sullivan	2 episodes
2000	Jack & Jill	Orthopedist	Episode: "Animal Planet: Part 2"
2000, 2001	Rocket Power	Various voices	2 episodes
2001	The District	Chief Horace Foley	Episode: "Lost and Found"
2001	Thieves	General Fitchman	Episode: "The General"
2001–2005	The West Wing	Senator Robert Royce	6 episodes
2003	Without a Trace	Dunlop	Episode: "Clare de Lune"
2004–2005	Boston Legal	Judge Harry Hingham	3 episodes
2006	According to Jim	Bob Morgan	Episode: "Polite Jim"
2006	Cold Case	Daniel Spyczyk	Episode: "Beautiful Little Fool"
2007	Shark	Judge Trevor C. Williams	2 episodes
2007–2015	Mad Men	Jim Hobart	6 episodes
2009	The Mentalist	Robert Lynch	Episode: "Bloodshot"
2009	NCIS	Thomas Victor	Episode: "The Inside Man"
2010	Bones	Judge Dufrey	Episode: "The Boy with the Answer"
2010	Medium	Sam Diller	Episode: "Blood on the Tracks"
2011	Criminal Minds: Suspect Behavior	Leon Lampl	Episode: "The Time Is Now"
2011	Desperate Housewives	Frank Sweeney	Episode: "Suspicion Song"
2012	CSI: Crime Scene Investigation	Art Weber	Episode: "Dune and Gloom"
2015	Rosewood	Alexis Stavros	Episode: "Vitamins and Vandals"
2015	Code Black	Lawrence Egan	Episode: "Doctors With Borders"
2016	Aquarius	Moses Snyder	Episode: "Revolution 1"
2016	The Last Ship	Senator William Beatty	4 episodes
2018	The Fosters	Bill Green	Episode: "Just Say Yes"
2019	Pearson	Lloyd Triple	Episode: "The Deputy Mayor"

=== Video games ===
Year	Title	Role
2005	X-Men Legends II: Rise of Apocalypse	Magneto
2006	Marvel: Ultimate Alliance	Magneto
2007	Skate	Additional voices
2007	Lost Odyssey	Roxian
2009	Dragon Age: Origins	Various voices
2010	Mass Effect 2	Various voices
2010	Metal Gear Solid: Peace Walker	Hot Coldman
2010	Fallout: New Vegas	Various voices
2011	Dead Space: Aftermath	The Overseer
2021	Mass Effect Legendary Edition	Various voices
