= Menendez: Blood Brothers =

2017 TV film by Fenton Bailey and Randy Barbato

- Promotional artwork
- Genre: Crime; drama
- Written by: Abdi Nazemian
- Directed by: Fenton Bailey; Randy Barbato
- Starring: Courtney Love; Nico Tortorella; Benito Martinez; Myko Olivier
- Country of origin: United States
- Original language: English

Production
- Executive producers: Fenton Bailey; Abdi Nazemian; Randy Barbato
- Producer: Jamie Goehring
- Editor: Toby Yates
- Running time: 120 minutes
- Production company: World of Wonder

Original release
- Network: Lifetime
- Release: June 11, 2017

Menendez: Blood Brothers is a 2017 television film directed by Fenton Bailey and Randy Barbato and written by Abdi Nazemian. Starring Courtney Love, Nico Tortorella, Myko Olivier, and Benito Martinez, it is based on the lives of Lyle and Erik Menendez, two brothers who were convicted of murdering their parents in Beverly Hills, California in 1989.

The film aired on the Lifetime network in North America on June 11, 2017.

== Cast ==
- Courtney Love as Mary "Kitty" Menendez
- Nico Tortorella as Lyle Menendez
- Myko Olivier as Erik Menendez
- Benito Martinez as José Menendez
- Meredith Scott Lynn as Leslie Abramson
- Alison Wandzura as Jill Lansing
- Kai Bradbury as Glenn Stevens
- Tom Belding as Male Juror
- Artine Brown as Leslie Zoeller
- Angelo Renai as Businessman
- Ash Lee as Lester Kuriyama

== Production ==
On January 31, 2017, it was announced that Courtney Love had joined the cast of the film. Cooper Koch auditioned for the role of Erik Menendez before Myko Olivier was ultimately cast alongside Nico Tortorella as Lyle Menendez. Koch would eventually portray Erik Menendez in the Netflix limited series Monsters: The Lyle and Erik Menendez Story (2024). The film was shot in Vancouver, British Columbia, Canada, between February and March 2017.

== Reception ==
Ken Tucker, writing for Yahoo! TV, found the film to be "a melodramatic mess" that "resembles a creepy high-school play" in quality. Similarly, New York Post critic Robert Rorke lambasted the murder scene in Menendez: Blood Brothers as "creepy and amateurish" and felt the film generally lacked any insight.

Broadly's Mitchell Sunderland, on the other hand, praised the film's tone and Love's performance in particular, stating that "Courtney Love's performance as Kitty holds the film together", highlighting her ability to be "over-the-top in one scene, and subtle the next, without the performance seeming disjointed."

== See also ==
- Menendez: A Killing in Beverly Hills, a 1994 film also based on the murders.
- Law & Order True Crime, a 2017 limited series also based on the murders.
- Monsters: The Lyle and Erik Menendez Story, a 2024 limited series also based on the murders.
