= Menendez: A Killing in Beverly Hills =

1994 miniseries by Larry Elikann

- Promotional poster
- Genre: Drama
- Written by: Philip Rosenberg
- Directed by: Larry Elikann
- Starring: Edward James Olmos; Beverly D'Angelo; Damian Chapa; Travis Fine; Margaret Whitton; Debrah Farentino; Julio Oscar Mechoso; Michelle Johnson; Dwight Schultz
- Music by: Joseph Conlan
- Country of origin: United States
- Original language: English
- No. of episodes: 2

Production
- Producers: Zev Braun; Philip Krupp; Vahan Moosekian
- Cinematography: Eric Van Haren
- Editor: Peter V. White
- Running time: 181 minutes
- Production companies: Braun Entertaining Group; TriStar Television; Zev Braun Productions

Original release
- Network: CBS
- Release: May 22, 1994

Menendez: A Killing in Beverly Hills is a 1994 American television miniseries directed by Larry Elikann. It centers on brothers Lyle and Erik Menendez, who murdered their parents in 1989. The film premiered on May 22, 1994 on CBS.

== Cast ==
- Edward James Olmos as José Menendez
- Beverly D'Angelo as Kitty Menendez
- Damian Chapa as Lyle Menendez
- Travis Fine as Erik Menendez
- Margaret Whitton as Leslie Abramson
- Debrah Farentino as Judalon Smyth
- Julio Oscar Mechoso as Lt. Arguello
- Michelle Johnson as Lisa
- Dwight Schultz as Dr. Jerome Oziel
- Michael Woolson as Craig
- Vincent Ventresca as Nick
- Dakin Matthews as Dean Barrow
- John Capodice as Larry Garth
- Jace Alexander as Carl Flynn
- Robert Gossett as Detective Lukes
- Michael Durrell as Bob Winters
- Sheila McCarthy as Jill Lansing

== See also ==
- Law & Order True Crime
- Menendez: Blood Brothers
- Monsters: The Lyle and Erik Menendez Story
