= Honor Thy Father and Mother: The True Story of the Menendez Murders =

1994 crime drama film by Paul Schneider

- Promotional poster
- Directed by: Paul Schneider
- Screenplay by: Michael J. Murray
- Story by: Ron Soble
- Based on: Blood Brothers by John Johnson and Ron Soble
- Produced by: Ronnie Hadar; Lance H. Robbins
- Starring: James Farentino; Jill Clayburgh; Billy Warlock; David Berón
- Cinematography: Christian Bielz
- Edited by: Andrew Cohen
- Production company: Libra Pictures
- Distributed by: A-Vision Entertainment; Fox Network; Saban International
- Release date: April 18, 1994
- Running time: 86 minutes
- Country: United States
- Language: English

Honor Thy Father and Mother: The True Story of the Menendez Murders is a 1994 American biographical crime drama film directed by Paul Schneider and written by Michael J. Murray, based on the novel Blood Brothers by Ron Soble and John Johnson. The film follows the 1989 murders of José and Mary "Kitty" Menendez by their sons, Lyle and Erik Menendez, in Beverly Hills, California, and the subsequent murder trials. It stars James Farentino, Jill Clayburgh, Billy Warlock, and David Berón.

The film premiered in the United States on April 18, 1994, and received mixed reviews from critics.

== Plot ==
Lyle and Erik Menendez were convicted in 1996 for the murders of their parents, José and Kitty Menendez. After the murders the narrative shifts to the investigation and the brothers' initial reactions, which are marked by grief and confusion. The police investigation, focused on the evidence that leads to the suspicion of the brothers. The prosecution contended that the brothers killed their parents to inherit the family wealth. Lyle and Erik maintained, even while serving life sentences without the possibility of parole, that their actions were driven by fear resulting from a lifetime of physical, emotional, and sexual abuse.

== Cast ==
- James Farentino as José Menendez
- Jill Clayburgh as Kitty Menendez
- Billy Warlock as Lyle Menendez
- David Berón as Erik Menendez
- John Beck as Detective. Les Zoeller
- Michael Paul Chan as Lester Kuriyama
- Erin Gray as Pamela Bozanich
- Elaine Joyce as Jill Lansing
- Stanley Kamel as Dr. Jerome Oziel
- Susan Blakely as Leslie Abramson
- Meg Wittner as Judalon Smyth
- Marcos Ferraez as
- Jeffrey Broadhurst as (as Jeffery Lee Broadhurst)
- Steve Bannos as Det. Tim Linehan

== Production ==
The film was directed by Paul Schneider and written by Michael J. Murray, based on the book Blood Brothers by John Johnson and Ronald L. Soble. Produced by Saban Entertainment for Fox, the film tells the murders of José and Kitty Menendez by their sons, Lyle and Erik. Honor Thy Father and Mother: The True Story of the Menendez Murders was filmed in Los Angeles, California, including on location in Van Nuys.

== Reception ==
Veronica Super Guide magazine gave the film a "2-star" rating, writing: "The film manages to avoid sensationalism and provides a good impression of the media hysteria surrounding major murder cases. Also known as The Menendez Killings." John J. O'Connor of The New York Times stated at the time of its release:

Mr. Moran asks Mr. Soble if his appearance in this movie didn't represent some kind of "crossing the line" in journalistic ethics. "I saw no problem with that," says Mr. Soble. Sorry, but I do.

— nytimes.com

Ken Tucker of Entertainment Weekly magazine gave the film a "D+" rating, criticizing its inability to deliver an enjoyable crime drama experience." Ken said that "The filmmakers seem not to have realized that one major reason the real-life Menéndez brothers were fascinating to watch as their cases played out on Court TV is precisely the reason Honor Thy Father and Mother is a dull TV movie."

=== Background and cultural impact ===
The Menendez murders, along with other high-profile cases of the 1990s such as the O.J. Simpson trial, marked a turning point in the relationship between the media and the American legal system. Honor Thy Father and Mother: The True Story of the Menendez Murders was the first television film about the Menendez murders, preceding a planned CBS adaptation of the case.
