= Meredith Scott Lynn =

American actress, producer, and director

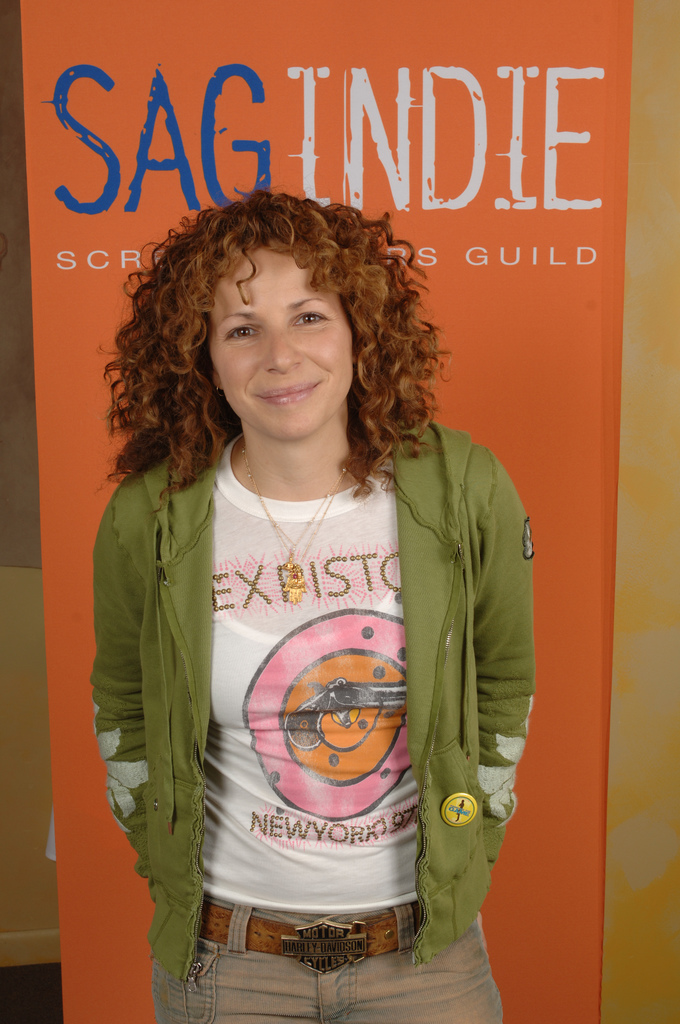
- Lynn in 2007
- Born: March 8, 1970 (age 56); Brooklyn, New York, U.S.
- Other name: Meredith Lynn Scott
- Education: High School of Performing Arts
- Occupations: Actress, director, producer
- Years active: 1988–present

Meredith Scott Lynn is an American actress, producer, and director, best known as Anne in Days of Our Lives (2012–2017).

== Early life ==
Lynn was born 8 March 1970 in Brooklyn, New York.

== Career in entertainment ==
In the 1980s, Lynn's entertainment career began with appearances in the final two episodes of The Facts of Life. She has over 60 film and television credits.

== Career in literacy ==
Lynn is the founder and CEO of WRiTE BRAiN BOOKS, supplying literacy-through-writing supplemental products to K-12 schools.

"...illustrated, wordless books with lines on the pages" - Meredith Scott Lynn

== Filmography ==
=== Film ===
Year	Film	Role	Notes
1994	The Girl in the Watermelon	Samantha Mayerofsky	
1994	Bleeding Hearts	Ruthie	
1996	Beat the Bash	Spokesperson	
1996	Mixed Nuts	Julie Manning	TV movie
1997	Take a Number	Megan	
1997	I Love You, Don't Touch Me!	Janet	
1998	Billy's Hollywood Screen Kiss	Georgiana	
1998	A Night at the Roxbury	Credit Vixen	
1998	The Lion King II: Simba's Pride	Adult Vitani	Voice actress, animated, direct-to-video
1999	Smut	Wendy	
1999	Forces of Nature	Debbie	
1999	Standing on Fishes	Erika	
2000	Loser	Dog-Loving Girl	
2001	Neurotic Tendencies		TV movie
2001	Legally Blonde	Enid Wexler	
2002	Sexy	Voice 4	Comedy short
2003	Hollywood Homicide	I.A. Detective Jackson	
2005	When Do We Eat?	Jennifer	
2006	How to Go Out on a Date in Queens	Elizabeth	
2007	Finishing the Game	Eloise Gazdag	
2008	The Neighbor	Mindy	
2008	Kung Fu Panda: Secrets of the Furious Five	Viper's Mother	Voice actress, animated, direct-to-video
2012	Vamps	Rita	

=== Television ===
Year	Title	Role	Notes
1988	The Facts of Life	Ashley Payne	2 episodes: "The Beginning of the End" & "The Beginning of the Beginning"
1990	The Marshall Chronicles	Leslie Barash	
1990	The Wonder Years	Angela	Episode: "Growing Up"
1990	21 Jump Street	Gina	Episode: "Tunnel of Love"
1992	CBS Schoolbreak Special		Episode: "Different Worlds: A Story of Interracial Love"
1992	Herman's Head	Helene	Episode: "Intern-al Affairs"
1992	Flying Blind	Leslie Barash	Episode: "Desperately Seeking Alicia"
1993	Law & Order	Corrine Sussman	Episode: "Benevolence"
1994	Daddy's Girls	Samantha Walker	
1995	Lois & Clark: The New Adventures of Superman	Sarah Goodwin	Episode: "Target: Jimmy Olsen!"
1995	The Pursuit of Happiness	Jean	
1996	Life with Roger	Myra	
1997	The Practice	Myra Glenn	Episode: "The Means"
1997	Judging Amy	Hilary Baker	2 episodes: "The Persistence of Tectonics" & "Witch Hunt"
1997-1998	Pepper Ann	Poison, Tank (voice)	2 episodes: "Sketch 22" (Poison) & "Presenting Stewart Walldinger" (Tank)
2000	Providence	Debbie	Episode: "Don't Go Changin'"
2001	The Huntress	Judith Logan	Episode: "The Two Mrs. Thorsons: Part 1"
2001	Kristin	Andrea	Episode: "The Home-Wrecker"
2001	Touched by an Angel	Rachel Silverstein	Episode: "Chutzpah"
2001–2002	Family Guy	Various (voice)	3 episodes: "Mr. Griffin Goes to Washington", "Peter Griffin: Husband, Father...Brother?" & "Stuck Together, Torn Apart"
2002	Roswell	Dominique Lazar	2 episodes: "Ch-Ch-Changes" & "Panacea"
2003	The Lyon's Den	Public Defender	Episode: "Separation Anxiety"
2004	Strong Medicine	Joy Severs	Episode: "Cape Cancer"
2005	Monk	Angela Dirks	Episode: "Mr. Monk Goes to the Office"
2005–2006	CSI: Crime Scene Investigation	Attorney Carol Allred	4 episodes
2005–2006	Girlfriends	Doreen Reznik	2 episodes: "Trial and Errors" & "Party Over Here"
2006	Pepper Dennis	Warden	Episode: "Pepper Dennis Behind Bars: Film at Eleven"
2007	How I Met Your Mother	Phyllis	Episode: "Lucky Penny"
2008	Desperate Housewives	Erica	Episode: "Welcome to Kanagawa"
2011	Law & Order: LA	Attorney	Episode: "Van Nuys"
2011	NCIS: Los Angeles	Abigail Johns	Episode: "Lone Wolf"
2011	American Horror Story	Helen	Episode: "Afterbirth"
2012	Weeds	Dinner Guest	Episode: "Threshold"
2012–2017	Days of Our Lives	Anne Milbauer	Recurring role
2017	Menendez: Blood Brothers	Leslie Abramson	
2021	The Morning Show	Linda	Episode: "Confirmations"
2022	The Rookie	Sheila Moore	Episode: "True Crime"

=== Producer ===
- Designing Blind (2006) TV series (executive producer) (unknown episodes)
- Standing on Fishes (1999) (producer)
- Demo Reel: A Tragedy in 10 Minutes (1999) (producer)
- Billy's Hollywood Screen Kiss (1998) (co-producer)
- I Love You, Don't Touch Me! (1997) (co-producer)

=== Director ===
- Standing on Fishes (1999)
- Parental Guidance (2008)

== Personal life ==
Lynn is Jewish. Lynn is friends with Jennifer Aniston. Lynn and Aniston attended Fiorello H. LaGuardia High School of Music & Art and Performing Arts.

Lynn supported the congressional candidacy of Marianne Williamson.

As the Jewish rap duo Sappho Sisters, Lynn performs as MC Jew C with Coley Sohn as Lil Mitzvah. Lynn has played drums (djembe) with Maggie Wheeler in song circles and community choirs.
