= Benito Martinez (actor) =

American actor (born 1971)

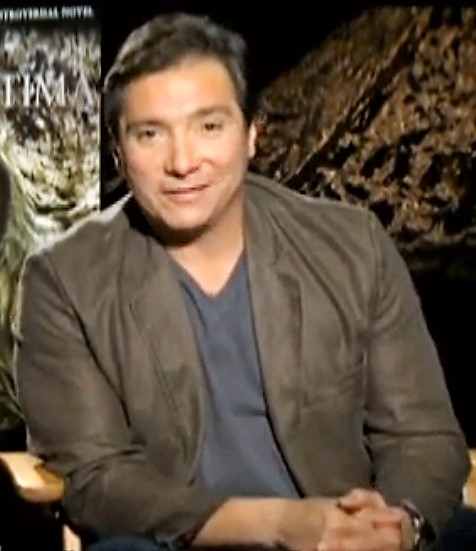
- Born: June 28, 1971 (age 55); Albuquerque, New Mexico, U.S.
- Occupation: Actor
- Years active: 1988–present

Benito Martinez (born June 28, 1971) is an American actor, best known for his role as LAPD Captain David Aceveda in the FX police drama The Shield, Luis Torres in Sons of Anarchy (2011–2012), Todd Denver in How to Get Away with Murder (2016–2018), Sheriff Diaz in 13 Reasons Why (2019–2020), and for his film roles in the movie My Family (1995) and Kill Your Darlings (2006).

== Early life ==
Martinez was born in Albuquerque, New Mexico. He attended Hollywood High School Performing Arts Center, along with Anthony Anderson. After graduating high school, he went to study at the London Academy of Music and Dramatic Art, where his sister also studied.

== Career ==
He returned to the United States and moved to Los Angeles, where he appeared as Fernandez in an episode of The Bronx Zoo, "The Gospel Truth".

He has worked in films such as Saw, Million Dollar Baby, End Game and The Dry Land. From 2015 to 2017, Martinez appeared as three different characters, Alonzo Gutierrez, Dominic Calderone and Luis Salazar in the crime drama television series American Crime for 17 episodes.

In animation and video games, he voices Lonestar in ¡Mucha Lucha!, Horatio Hidalgo in What's New, Scooby-Doo?, Coyote Smith in Killer7, Manuel Noriega in Call of Duty: Black Ops II and Captain Julian Dawes in Battlefield Hardline.

In 2017, Martinez played José Menendez in the Lifetime original movie Menendez: Blood Brothers, and appeared as James Rangel in the autobiographical action-comedy film American Made, featuring Tom Cruise, Domhnall Gleeson, Sarah Wright, Jayma Mays, Jesse Plemons and Alejandro Edda.

From 2021 to 2023, Martinez had a recurring role as Texas Ranger Major Gabriel Reyes (father of Austin police officer Carlos Reyes) in the FOX TV series 9-1-1: Lone Star.

== Filmography ==
=== Film ===
Year	Title	Role	Notes
1993	Sunset Grill	Guillermo	
1995	Outbreak	Dr. Julio Ruiz	
1995	My Family	Young Paco Sánchez	
2003	Scooby-Doo! and the Monster of Mexico	El Curandero/Man No. 2	Voice, direct-to-video
2004	Saw	Brett	
2004	¡Mucha Lucha!: The Return of El Maléfico	Lonestar, Don Reyes	Voice, direct-to-video
2004	Million Dollar Baby	Billie's Manager	
2006	End Game	Ramsey	
2006	Kill Your Darlings	Officer Jones	
2009	Not Forgotten	Detective Sanchez	
2010	The Dry Land	David Valdez	
2010	Unthinkable	Alvarez	
2010	Takers	Officer in Charge	
2013	Bless Me, Ultima	Gabriel Márez	
2014	Beyond the Lights	Jesse Soria	
2017	American Made	James Rangel	
2019	Queen & Slim	Sheriff Edgar	
2023	Fool's Paradise	Mayor Raposa	
2024	Carry-On	Security Director Marm Bellows	

=== Television ===
Year	Title	Role	Notes
1988	The Bronx Zoo	Fernadez	Episode: "The Gospel Truth"
1990–92	Zorro	José Macias	2 episodes
1992	Reasonable Doubts	Savedra	Episode: "Silence"
1993	Star Trek: The Next Generation	Salazar	Episode: "Descent": Part 2
1996	Chicago Hope	Orderly	Episode: "A Day in the Life"
1996	The X-Files	Orderly	Episode: "The Beginning"
1998	L.A. Doctors	Policeman	Episode: "Leap of Faith"
1999	Silk Stalkings	Cesar	Episode: "Dance of Fever"
2001	NYPD Blue	Lieutenant Gomez	Episode: "Russelmania"
2001	Touched by an Angel	Officer Dave	Episode: "The Birthday Present"
2001	Once and Again	Raoul	Episode: "Chaos Theory"
2002	American Family	Police Officer	Episode: "Pilot"
2002	For the People	Dr. Leonard Bushnell	Episode: "Our Own"
2002	What's New, Scooby-Doo?	Horatio Hidalgo	Voice, episode: "High-Tech House of Horrors"
2002–05	¡Mucha Lucha!	Lone Star	Voice, 5 episodes
2002	Firefly	Boss	Episode: "Our Mrs. Reynolds"
2002–08	The Shield	David Aceveda	86 episodes
2003	Karen Sisco	Ed Fuentes	Episode: "Blown Away"
2006	Monk	Foreman – Juror No. 7	Episode: "Mr. Monk Gets Jury Duty"
2006	Numb3rs	Arthur Ruiz	Episode: "Provenance"
2006	Bones	Thomas Vega	Episode: "Aliens in a Spaceship"
2007	Standoff	Senator Espinosa	Episode: "The Kids in the Hall"
2008	Shark	Agent Juarez	Episode: "Wayne's World 3: Killer Shark"
2008–09	The Unit	President-Elect Benjamin Castillo	3 episodes
2009	The Forgotten	Police Chief	Episode: "Pilot"
2009–10	Saving Grace	Ronnie Rodriguez	8 episodes
2010	24	Victor Aruz	2 episodes
2010	Burn Notice	David	Episode: "Neighbourhood Watch"
2010	Lie to Me	Charlie Sheridan	Episode: "Pied Piper"
2011	Covert Affairs	Jorge	Episode: "All the Right Friends"
2011	Torchwood: Miracle Day	Captain Santos	Episode: "The Blood Line"
2011–12	Supernatural	Edgar/Leviathan	5 episodes
2011–12	Sons of Anarchy	Luis Torres	16 episodes
2012	Major Crimes	Javier Ramirez	Episode: "Out of Bounds"
2013	Dallas	Officer	Episode: "Legacies"
2013	Castle	Special Agent Sam Walker	Episode: "The Wild Rover"
2013	NCIS: Los Angeles	Gonzalo Vargas	Episode: "Drive"
2013	Almost Human	Captain Alexio Barros	Episode: "The Bends"
2014–15	House of Cards	Senator Hector Mendoza	7 episodes
2014	The Mentalist	Commander Delgado	Episode: "Black Helicopters"
2014	Graceland	Alfredo Armas	Episode: "Connects"
2015	American Crime	Alonzo Gutierrez	11 episodes Satellite Award for Best Cast – Television Series
2015	Criminal Minds	Chief Raul Montoya	Episode: "Outlaw"
2016–2019	The Blacklist	Robert Diaz	8 episodes
2016	American Crime	Dominic Calderone	Episode: "Season Two: Episode Ten"
2016–18	How to Get Away with Murder	D.A. Todd Denver	18 episodes
2017	American Crime	Luis Salazar	5 episodes Nominated—Critics' Choice Television Award for Best Supporting Actor in a Movie/Miniseries
2017	The Leftovers	Arturo	Episode: "It's a Matt, Matt, Matt, Matt World"
2018	Law & Order: Special Victims Unit	Santino Rojas	Episode: Remember Me Too
2019–20	13 Reasons Why	Sheriff Diaz	17 episodes
2019	Jack Ryan	Senator Jim Moreno	Episode: "Cargo"
2019	Hawaii Five-0	Mateo Dias	Episode: "Ka'I' o"
2021–23	9-1-1: Lone Star	Gabriel Reyes	10 Episodes
2021	Mr. Mayor	Mayor Victor Delgado	2 episodes
2021	On My Block	Ricky Galindo	2 episodes
2021–2023	With Love	Jorge Diaz Sr.	Main role season 1; recurring season 2
2022	S.W.A.T.	Miguel Velez	Episode: "Survive"
2022	Big Sky	Dr. Cowley	2 episodes
2023	The Rookie	Judge Rivas	Episode: "Death Sentence"
2024	CSI: Vegas	Raphael Tarquenio	Season 3 Episode 1: "The Reaper"
2024	Station 19	Chief Gonzalez	Episode: "How Am I Supposed to Live Without You"
2026	NCIS	Detective Conklin	Episode: "Bad Impressions"

=== Television films ===
Year	Title	Role	Notes
1996	Her Costly Affair	Campus Cop	
2010	Mandrake	Harry Vargas	
2016	Home	Peter Ochoa	
2017	Menendez: Blood Brothers	José Menendez	
2017	Behind Enemy Lines	Mateo Rodriguez	
2019	Jane the Novela	Raul	

=== Video games ===
Year	Title	Role	Notes
2005	Killer7	Coyote Smith	
2005	Age of Empires III	Francisco Juan Delgado de Leon / General Simón Bolívar	
2010	Vanquish	Professor Francois Candide	English version
2012	Call of Duty: Black Ops II	Manuel Noriega	
2013	Metal Gear Rising: Revengeance	Khamsin / Desperado scientist	English version
2013	Army of Two: The Devil's Cartel	Esteban Bautista	
2015	Battlefield Hardline	Captain Julian Dawes	
2025	Battlefield 6	President Richard Fernandez	
