= Lannert =

Lannert is a surname. Notable people with the name include:

- Christopher Lannert (born 1998), German footballer
- Judit Lannert (born 1962), Hungarian academic and politician
- Stacey Lannert (born 1972), American murderer
