= Jimmy Stofer =

- Born: Minneapolis, Minnesota
- Genres: Pop rock, alternative rock, folk rock
- Occupations: Singer, bassist, composer, producer
- Instruments: Vocals, bass

Jimmy Stofer is an American singer, bassist, composer, and record producer.

== Life and career ==
Stofer was born in Minneapolis, Minnesota. He currently lives in Los Angeles, CA. His credits include The Fray, Rose Hill Drive, Ryan Bingham, Scars On 45, Weather Maps, Cary Brothers, Meese, Hello Kavita, VAN STEE, Dualistics, and more.

Stofer was the touring bassist for Denver-based piano rock band The Fray, for three years. The Fray had never had an official bassist, and in 2004, Stofer was employed as their touring bassist. Stofer's talent became evident to The Fray on the local scene. At the time, Stofer was the bassist for the hip hop group Flobots and funk rock band Bop Skizzum, while he was attending the University of Colorado at Boulder The Fray came calling for a bassist. Stofer and The Fray amicably disbanded in 2007, and he focused his attention on his own bands (including Dualistics and The Commentary. He made an appearance in the music video for "Over My Head (Cable Car)"

Stofer was a member of Hello Kavita, an indie folk group from Denver, Colorado, and played bass and co-wrote their second album, To A Loved One. In June 2010, Jimmy was also presented as a new member of Rose Hill Drive. In 2011, the band toured as an opener for Stone Temple Pilots for a few months.

Stofer was recognized by Bass Player magazine for his contributions to his trade.

He is the singer and main songwriter of the band Weather Maps. Their debut album Places was released in late 2010. The second album Painted Stripes was released in August 2014.

Jimmy is also a composer/producer for the orchestral/electronic trio Aux Cerna. Their debut album "Textures" was released in August 2022.

== Film / TV ==
Jimmy is a composer for film and television. His credits include The Menendez Brothers (film), Girl in the Picture, Icahn: The Restless Billionaire, American Murder: Gabby Petito, Vice (TV series), American Murder: Laci Peterson, Daughters of the Cult, The Truth About Jim, The Night House, Drunk Bus, My Father, the BTK Killer, Miracle Fishing: Kidnapped Abroad, Look Into My Eyes, Babysplitters, and many others.
