= Lynn Milgrim =

American actress

- Born: March 17, 1944 (age 82); Philadelphia, Pennsylvania, U.S.
- Occupation: Actress
- Spouse: H. Richard Greene

Lynn Milgrim (born March 17, 1944) is an American film, television, and stage actress. She is best known as an accomplished stage actress and has been in numerous Broadway, national, and regional productions. She has also appeared in many feature films, television series, and television movies.

== Early years ==
Milgrim was born on March 17, 1944, in Philadelphia, Pennsylvania. She graduated from Swarthmore and received her master's degree in elementary education from Harvard in 1965. While she taught sixth grade in Arlington, Massachusetts, she worked nights at Loeb Drama Center.

== Career ==
=== Stage roles ===
Broadway roles include: Bedroom Farce as Jan, Otherwise Engaged as Davina, and Charley's Aunt as Amy Spettigue.

Other stage roles include: What Would Jeanne Moreau Do? by Elinor Jones; WIN/LOSE/DRAW at the Provincetown Playhouse, with The New York Times calling her a "delightful actress"; Lynne Meadow's Close of Play; playing Helena (Staff) in William Shakespeare's play A Midsummer's Night Dream at the Actors Theatre of Louisville; playing Celimene in Molière's play The Misanthrope in the Williamstown Theatre Festival production at the Adams Memorial Theatre Main Stage at Williams College in Williamstown, Massachusetts with Emery Battis; as Mrs. Yang in Bertolt Brecht's play The Good Woman of Setzuan, also at Williams College; as Geraldine Barclay in Joe Orton's play What The Butler Saw, also at Williams College; and playing the mother-in-law in the Bertolt Brecht play The Caucasian Chalk Circle at the South Coast Repertory in Costa Mesa, California; and many more.

More recent productions include: Samuel D. Hunter's Rest and Outside Mullingar by John Patrick Shanley, both also at South Coast Repertory; a revival of Joseph Kesserling’s 1941 Broadway classic Arsenic And Old Lace at La Mirada Theatre in Los Angeles; Christine Deitne's Diana of Dobson's; Eastern Standard at the Coast Playhouse; George Bernard Shaw's Pygmalion at the Pasadena Playhouse, with her performance called "excellent"; Hedda Gabler; and A Doll's House, Part 2. Migrim is a company member of the Antaeus Theatre Company in Los Angeles.

=== Television roles ===
Year	Title	Role	Notes	Ref(s)
1971	The Doctors	Vanessa		
1978	Another World	Susan Shearer	4 episodes	
1986	The Equalizer	Mrs. Lenox	Episode: "Unnatural Causes"	
1999	Rugrats	Corrine	Voice 1 episode	
1999	Everybody Loves Raymond	Cecily	1 episode	
2011	Franklin & Bash	Nana	2 episodes	
2011 - 2012	Kung Fu Panda: Legends of Awesomeness	Qiong Qi (voice) Female Pig (voice)		
2012	Winx Club	The Ancestral Spirit of Nature	1 episode	
2012	Southland	Mary	1 episode	
2017	Chicago Med	Sylvia Roseblatt	1 episode	
2018	The Fosters	Beth Green	1 episode	

She has had recurring roles and made guest appearances on major TV shows such as The Doctors,The Wonder Years, Life Goes On, Mama's Family, Knots Landing, Who's the Boss?, Highway to Heaven, CBS Summer Playhouse, The Equalizer, 9-1-1

=== Film roles ===
Year	Title	Role	Notes	Ref(s)
2004	Employee of the Month	Mrs. Chapman		

Her film credits include Tell Me That You Love Me, Junie Moon (1970), Enormous Changes at the Last Minute (1983), two Cybill Shepherd movies (Telling Secrets (1993) (TV) and Baby Brokers (1994)

=== Video game roles ===
Year	Title	Role	Notes	Ref(s)
1999	Rugrats Adventure Game	Female Teacher		

== Personal life ==
She is married to fellow actor H. Richard Greene, and they have a daughter. They had recurring roles as Jim and Evelyn Cooper, Winnie Cooper's parents, on The Wonder Years.
