= Kevin Page (actor) =

American actor, artist (b. 1958)

- Born: June 20, 1958 (age 68); Oklahoma, United States
- Other name: Ken Page
- Occupations: Actor, artist
- Years active: 1987–2014
- Spouse: Linda Page
- Children: 1

Kevin Page, also credited as Ken Page, (born June 20, 1958), is an actor. He is perhaps best known for his recurring roles on Dallas as Steven "Bum" Jones, right-hand man of J.R. Ewing and on Seinfeld as Stu Chermack. He also appears in the 1987 film RoboCop as Mr. Kinney, a young executive who is violently killed by an ED-209 police robot during a boardroom demonstration gone wrong.

== Career ==
Kevin Page played Bum, a henchman of J.R. Ewing who was eventually revealed to be his killer in the rebooted series second-season finale Legacies.

== Personal life ==
Kevin Page opened an art gallery in Dallas, Texas.

Page worked as a stockbroker for Smith Barney from 1997 to 1998.

Page lives with his wife, Linda. They have a daughter named Isabella.

== Filmography ==
Film
Year	Film	Role	Notes
1987	RoboCop	Kinney	Credited as Ken Page
1989	Night Game	Andy	Credited as Ken Page
1990	Dark Angel	White Boy #1	
1991	Stone Cold	Mobster #2	
1991	Death Dreams	Dr. Holvag	
1991	The Woman Who Sinned	Ted Osborne	Short
1992	Woman with a Past	Lawyer #2	Short
1992	Quake	Other Man In Crowd	Video
1993	Nowhere to Run	Hales Associate	
1994	Deep Red	Patrolman	TV movie
1994	Without Consent	Mr. Carlson	
1996	Space Marines	"Lucky"	
1996	Crusader: No Regret	Denning	Video game
1996	Dallas: J.R. Returns	Officer #1	TV movie
1997	True Women	Soldier #1	
2004	The Alamo	Micajah Autry	
2004	Friday Night Lights	John Wilkins	
2018	Who is Martin Danzig?	Simon Cobb	Short film
Television
Year	Title	Role	Notes
1991	L.A. Law	Bookworm #4	One episode: Splatoon
1991	Hunter	Bob Abbott	One episode: Room Service
1991	Quantum Leap	Young Doctor	One episode: Shock Theater - October 3, 1954
1992	Baywatch	Hal	One episode: The Chamber
1992	In the Heat of the Night	Louis Moseley	One episode: Moseley's Lot
1992–1998	Seinfeld	Stu Chermack	Five episodes: The Ticket, The Pitch, The Virgin, The Pilot and The Finale
1994	Babylon 5	Businessman	One episode: Mind War
1995–1999	Wishbone	Various roles	Seventeen episodes
1995–1996	Walker Texas Ranger	Kyle / Lieutenant Governor John Trenner / Clark Chadwick	Three episodes: Mustangs, Standoff, Lucky
2012–2014	Dallas	Bum	Twenty episodes
