= Tim Rutten =

American journalist (1950–2022)

- Born: Timothy Calder Rutten; April 8, 1950; San Bernardino, California, U.S.
- Died: September 8, 2022 (aged 72); Alhambra, California
- Education: California State University, Los Angeles
- Occupation: Journalist
- Spouse: Leslie Abramson (divorced)

Timothy Calder Rutten (April 8, 1950 – September 8, 2022) was an American journalist with the Los Angeles Daily News. He worked for the Los Angeles Times for nearly 40 years between 1971 and 2011. Rutten was married to Leslie Abramson.

== Education ==
A native of San Bernardino, California, Rutten majored in political science at California State University, Los Angeles.

== Career ==
Rutten started at the paper in 1971 as a copy editor in the View section. His positions in subsequent years included city bureau chief, metro reporter, editorial writer, assistant national editor, Opinion editor and assistant editor for the Editorial Page. He was laid off from his position as an Op Ed contributor in a staff cutback in 2011.

== Awards ==
Rutten won a 1991 award from the Greater Los Angeles Press Club for editorial writing. He wrote about the 1994 Northridge earthquake, which won him a share of a 1995 Pulitzer Prize awarded to the staff of the Times for Breaking News Reporting. He became the first to notice, and publicly expose, several doctored or manipulated photographs in the 2006 Lebanon War photographs controversies. In 2007, he was honored by the Anti-Defamation League for advancing the ideals of the First Amendment.

== Death ==
Rutten died in September 2022 after falling at his home in Alhambra, California at the age of 72.

== In popular culture ==
Rutten was portrayed by Chris Bauer in Law & Order True Crime: The Menendez Murders (2017) and by Michael Gladis in Monsters: The Lyle and Erik Menendez Story (2024).
