= The Menendez Brothers (film) =

- Release poster
- Directed by: Alejandro Hartmann
- Produced by: Ross M. Dinerstein; Rebecca Evens
- Cinematography: Topher Osborn
- Edited by: James Cude
- Music by: Jimmy Stofer
- Production company: Campfire Studios
- Distributed by: Netflix
- Release date: October 7, 2024
- Running time: 116 minutes
- Country: United States
- Language: English

The Menendez Brothers is a 2024 American true crime documentary film directed by Alejandro Hartmann for the streaming company Netflix, in which brothers Lyle and Erik Menendez, who were convicted of the 1989 murders of their parents, are interviewed about the case.

== Synopsis ==
The documentary film tells the story of Lyle and Erik Menendez, who were convicted in 1996 for the murders of their parents on August 20, 1989. In the documentary, for the first time in about thirty years, the brothers themselves talk about what exactly happened and why they did it. The brothers do this through audio interviews from prison, where they are still incarcerated.

In addition to the brothers, others involved in the case speak in the film, including family, lawyers, jurors, reporting journalists, and the lead prosecutor Pamela Bozanich.

== Appearing in documentary ==
- Lyle and Erik Menendez, the brothers convicted in 1996 of murdering their parents.
- Diane Vander Molen, the Menendez brothers' cousin; who testified in their favor during the trial.
- Joan Vander Molen, the Menendez brothers' aunt; sister of Kitty.
- Pamela Bozanich, the lead prosecutor at the first trial of the Menendez brothers' case.
- Robert Rand, journalist who covered the trials for the Miami Herald; author of The Menendez Murders.
- Alan Abrahamson, journalist who covered the first trial for Los Angeles Times.
- Hazel Thornton, juror from the first trial; author of Hung Jury: The Diary of a Menendez Juror.
- Betty Oldfield, juror from the first trial.
- Andrew Wolfberg, juror from the second trial.
- Shelley Ross, former producer and executive of ABC News.
- Dr. Ann Burgess, researcher and Psychiatric Clinical Nurse Specialist who served as a defense expert in the first trial.
- Dr. William Vicary, defense expert and psychiatrist who evaluated and treated Erik.
- John Conte, defense expert and professor of social work who served in the Menendez brothers' trial.
- Stanley Goldman, veteran LA public defender.
- Cliff Gardner, appellate attorney to the Menendez brothers.

== Production ==
The documentary film was announced by streaming company Netflix at the end of September 2024, a few days after premiering the dramatization Monsters: The Lyle and Erik Menendez Story, a limited series in the Netflix Monster themed set of limited series of crime dramas, which is also based on the Menendez case and was also produced by Netflix. The documentary was directed by Alejandro Hartmann and produced by Ross M. Dinerstein and Rebecca Evans on behalf of the production company Campfire Studios. Lyle and Erik Menendez collaborated on the documentary from prison via extensive audio interviews.

== Release ==
On September 23, 2024, a trailer was released for the film, featuring segments from the documentary. The Menendez Brothers was released on Netflix on October 7, 2024. An accompanying podcast featuring interviews and conversations that were cut from the film was released on October 9, 2024.

== Reception ==
The documentary debuted as the most-watched film on Netflix worldwide, earning 22.7 million views (or 44.7 million hours viewed) in its first week.
