= Chris Bauer =

American actor

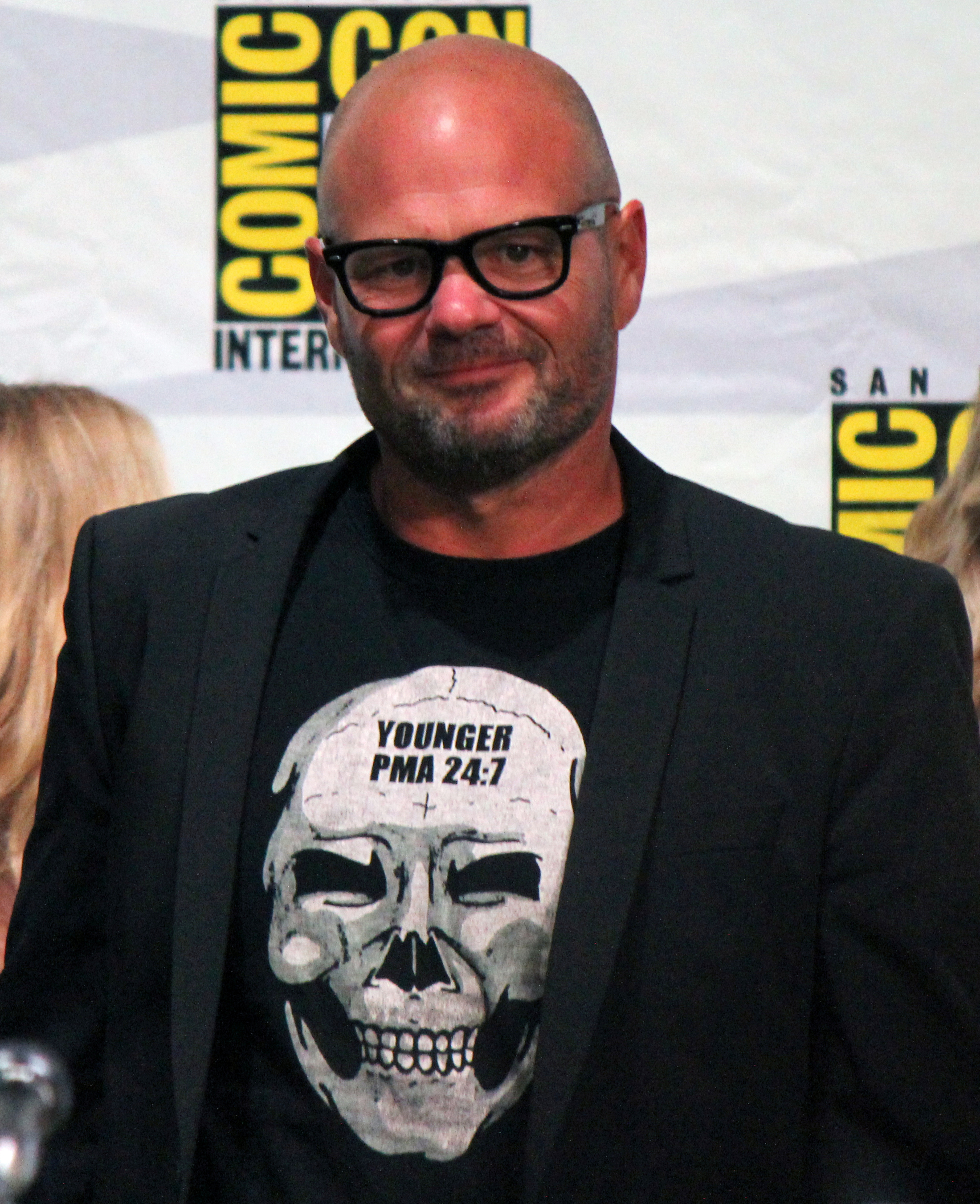
- Bauer in 2014
- Education: University of San Diego (BA); Yale University (MFA)
- Occupation: Actor
- Years active: 1989–present
- Spouse: Laura Bauer (m. 1997)
- Children: 2

Chris Bauer is an American actor. He is best known for his television work in The Wire, Third Watch, True Blood, Survivor's Remorse, The Deuce, and the science fiction space drama series For All Mankind. He has also appeared on Broadway, as Mitch in A Streetcar Named Desire, and has originated roles in plays by David Mamet, John Patrick Shanley, and Jez Butterworth.

== Early life and education ==
Born on October 28, 1966, he attended Miramonte High School in Orinda, California, and played on the Miramonte football team in his senior year, 1984, the year the team won the state championship. Later, he attended the University of San Diego and the American Academy of Dramatic Arts, and graduated from the Yale School of Drama.

== Career ==
=== Television ===
Bauer has starred in numerous television series including The Wire, as port-union boss Frank Sobotka. He initially auditioned for the role of Jimmy McNulty. He also starred in Billy Crystal's 2001 film 61*, as New York Yankees player Bob Cerv. His roles on network television include a regular role as Fred Yokas, husband of Officer Faith Yokas, on the NBC series Third Watch, lead FBI Agent Dodd on the short-lived CBS series Smith, a priest on ABC's Life on Mars, and as Detective Lou Destefano in the original Sci-Fi channel miniseries The Lost Room. In 2004, he played Lee Nickel on the ESPN series Tilt. He appeared in the episode "The No-Brainer" of the television series Fringe as Brian Dempsey, and appeared in multiple episodes of Numb3rs as Dr. Raymond "Ray" Galuski and in Criminal Minds, in season one, as the antagonist.

Chris Bauer played Det. (later Sheriff) Andy Bellefleur on the TV-series True Blood. He also played Dennis Halsey, a guard on Unforgettable in the fourth episode of the first season, "Up In Flames", and appeared as a rival salesman from the Syracuse branch of Dunder Mifflin in Season 8 of The Office (US). In 2014, Bauer guest starred in an episode of NBC's Parks and Recreation.

In October 2014 Bauer started a recurring role on the Starz comedy Survivor's Remorse. He played Jimmy Flaherty, the owner of a fictitious Atlanta professional basketball team. The show was written by Mike O'Malley, who also served as an executive producer along with NBA star LeBron James, and star Jessie T. Usher. Survivor's Remorse ran 4 seasons and concluded in 2017.

Bauer played Det. Tom Lange in the FX limited series American Crime Story. Bauer appeared as Tim Rutten in the NBC mini-series Law & Order True Crime: The Menendez Brothers, and from 2017 to 2019 co-starred as Bobby Dwyer in the HBO series The Deuce.

In 2018, Bauer guest starred as the negotiator Dennis Cole in Brooklyn Nine-Nine season 5 episode 13 "The Negotiator".

In 2019, Bauer portrayed NASA astronaut and Director of Flight Crew Operations Deke Slayton in the first season of the Apple TV+ original science fiction space drama series For All Mankind.

=== Film ===
Bauer's first film appearance was in Snow White: A Tale of Terror, with Sigourney Weaver, Sam Neill, and Monica Keena. Soon after, Bauer played schoolteacher/pedophile Lloyd Gettys in the 1997 film The Devil's Advocate. He played prisoner NB9674932-65 Ivan Dubov in the 1997 action film Face/Off, appearing alongside Nicolas Cage. He then appeared as the masked character 'Machine' in the 1999 film 8mm also starring Cage. He starred as fetish photographer Irving Klaw in the 2005 Bettie Page biopic The Notorious Bettie Page, and as famous author Ken Kesey in a 2007 Neal Cassady biopic. Bauer played a small role in the 2005 Jim Jarmusch film, Broken Flowers. He was featured in the movie The Conspirator, as a fellow officer following Abraham Lincoln's assassination, and played a minor role in Flags of Our Fathers. In 2015, Bauer played the role of 'Pa' in Disney's Tomorrowland. He also appeared in Money Monster as Lt. Nelson, and played Larry Rooney in Sully.

== Filmography ==
=== Film ===
Year	Title	Role	Notes
1997	Snow White: A Tale of Terror	Konrad	Credited as Christopher Bauer
1997	The Myth of Fingerprints	Jerry	Credited as Christopher Bauer
1997	Fools Rush In	Phil	
1997	Colin Fitz	Tony Baby Shark	
1997	One Night Stand	Bartender	Credited as Christopher Bauer
1997	Face/Off	Dubov	
1997	The Devil's Advocate	Lloyd Gettys	Credited as Christopher Bauer
1998	A Cool, Dry Place	Larry Ives	Credited as Christopher Bauer
1999	Sweet and Lowdown	Ace - Pool Player	
1999	Flawless	Jacko	
1999	8mm	Machine	
1999	Cradle Will Rock	VTA - Carpenter	
2000	The Photographer	Paul	
2000	Animal Factory	Bad Eye	
2000	High Fidelity	Paul	
2002	The Story of Calvin Stoller, Last Abstract Expressionist	Calvin Stoller	
2002	Bug	Ernie	
2002	Anatomy of a Breakup	Jake	Short, credited as Christopher Bauer
2002	Angels Crest	Teddy	
2002	Keane	Bartender	
2004	Hell's Island	Lalo	
2005	Broken Flowers	Dan	
2005	The Notorious Bettie Page	Irving Klaw	
2006	Bernard and Doris	Chef	
2006	Flags of Our Fathers	Commandant Vandegrift	
2007	Neal Cassady	Ken Kesey	
2008	The Guitar	Chief of Surgery	Uncredited
2008	Diminished Capacity	Lloyd	
2010	The Conspirator	Major Smith	
2015	Tomorrowland	Frank's Dad	
2015	Wrestling Isn't Wrestling	Referee	Video documentary short
2016	Temps	Mike	
2016	Wolves	Charlie	
2016	Sully	Larry Rooney	
2016	Money Monster	Lt. Nelson	
2017	Dismissed	Mr. Ward	
2019	A Dog's Way Home	Kurch	
2019	3 Days with Dad	Father Rose	
2021	The Little Things	Detective Sal Rizoli	
2025	Thunderbolts*	Holt	
2025	Henry Johnson	Mr. Barnes	
2025	Our Hero, Balthazar	Beaver	
2025	Find Your Friends	Russell	
2025	Eenie Meanie	Gary	
2026	Maddie's Secret	Dr. Kronenfield	
TBA	Speed-the-Plow	Mickey	Post-production

=== Television ===
Year	Title	Role	Episodes
1989	Midnight Caller	Baby Chase	Episode: "Truck Driver"
1989	A Fine Romance	Crewman	Episode: "The Tomas Crown Affair"
1992, 1996, 2002, 2024	Law & Order	Homeless David / Mickey Scott / Sergeant / Jack Costa	Episodes: "Forgiveness", "Aftershock", "Patriot", "Big Brother"
1994	The Untouchables	Doorman	Episode: "Stadt"
1996	New York Undercover	Terry Fillpot	Episode: "Unis"
1999	The Hunley	Simkins	TV movie
1999–2004	Third Watch	Fred Yokas	Main role; 53 episodes
2001	61*	Bob Cerv	TV movie
2001	The Fugitive	Goon	Episode: "Thanatos"
2001	Dead Last	Dale	Episode: "To Serve, with Love"
2001	Taking Back Our Town	James Melancon	TV movie
2003	The Wire	Frank Sobotka	Main role; 12 episodes
2005	The Exonerated	Cop #1	TV movie
2005	Jonny Zero	Stringer	Recurring role; 6 episodes
2005	Tilt	Leeland Lee Nickel	Main role; 9 episodes
2005	Our Fathers	Olan Horne	TV movie
2005	Criminal Minds	Ted Bryar	Episode: "Derailed"
2006	Conviction	Mr. Foye	Episode: "Denial"
2006	Masters of Horror	Larry Pierce	Episode: "Sounds Like"
2006	American Experience	Hiram Pierce	Episode: "The Gold Rush"
2006	The Lost Room	Lou Destefano	Main role; 2 episodes
2006	Smith	Agent Dodd	Main role; 3 episodes
2007	CSI: Crime Scene Investigation	Detective Paul Browning	Episode: "Sweet Jane"
2007	Law & Order: Criminal Intent	Murtaugh	Episode: "30"
2007	The Black Donnellys	Huey Farrell	Episodes: "Pilot", "The World Will Break Your Heart", "Wasn't That Enough?"
2007, 2008	Numb3rs	Ray Galuski	Episodes: "Velocity", "Breaking Point"
2008	New Amsterdam	Andrew Gleason	Episode: "Reclassified"
2008	Life on Mars	Father Tim	Episode: "Things to Do in New York When You Think You're Dead"
2008–2014	True Blood	Andy Bellefleur	Main role; 81 episodes
2009	Fringe	Brian Dempsey	Episode: "The No-Brainer"
2009	The Good Wife	James McCloon	Episode: "Fixed"
2009, 2017	Law & Order: Special Victims Unit	Bill Tattenger / Sgt. Tom Cole	Episodes: "Hammered", "Next Chapter"
2011	Unforgettable	Dennis Halsey / Guard	Episode: "Up in Flames"
2011	Hawaii Five-0	Cory Sampson	Episode: "Ike Maka"
2012	Prime Suspect	Stevie	Episode: "Stuck in the Middle with You"
2012	The Office	Harry Jannerone	Episode: "Turf War"
2013	Elementary	Detective Gerry Coventry	Episode: "On the Line"
2014	Parks and Recreation	Harold	Episode: "Ann and Chris"
2014	The Divide	Jared Bankowski / Justice	Episodes: "Facts Are the Enemy", "The Way Men Divide", "No Such Thing"
2014–2017	Survivor's Remorse	Jimmy Flaherty	Main role; 17 episodes
2015	Full Circle	Richie DeStefano	Episodes: "Jimmy & Richie", "Shelly & Katie", "Richie & Shelly"
2015	The Lizzie Borden Chronicles	Tom Horn	Episodes: "Capsize", "The Sister's Grimke"
2016	American Crime Story	Detective Tom Lange	Main role (season 1)
2017	Law & Order True Crime: The Menendez Murders	Tim Rutten	Main role; 9 episodes
2017–2019	The Deuce	Bobby Dwyer	Main role; 24 episodes
2018	Brooklyn Nine-Nine	Dennis Kole	Episode: "The Negotiation"
2018	Modern Family	Officer Stablitzky	Episode: "CHiPs and Salsa"
2018	Unsolved	Sheriff Hilman	Episode: "Unsolved?"
2019	For All Mankind	Deke Slayton	Recurring role; 9 episodes
2020	FBI	Dan Osborne	Episode: "Payback"
2020	Homeland	Kevin Dance	Episode: "The English Teacher"
2021–2023	Heels	Wild Bill Hancock	Main role
2022	Gaslit	James McCord	5 episodes
2022	Sprung	Stan	Recurring role; 4 episodes
2023	Fellow Travelers	McCarthy	Recurring role
2025	Bosch: Legacy	Sheriff Deputy Jack Garrity	Episodes: "La Zona Rosa", "Badlands"
2025	Poker Face	Don Hooper	Episode: "Whack-A-Mole"
2026	His & Hers	Clyde Duffie	Upcoming series
TBA	The Murder of JonBenét Ramsey	Tom Koby	Upcoming series

== Awards and nominations ==
Year	Award	Category	Nominated work	Result	Ref.
2009	14th Satellite Awards	Best Cast (or Best Ensemble) – Television Series	True Blood	Won	
2010	16th Screen Actors Guild Awards	Outstanding Performance by an Ensemble in a Drama Series	True Blood	Nominated	
