= Satellite Award for Best Cast – Television Series =

Annual television award

Satellite Award for Best Ensemble – Television
- Awarded for: Best Ensemble in a Television Series
- Country: United States
- Presented by: International Press Academy
- First award: 2000
- Currently held by: Landman (2026)

The Satellite Award for Best Cast (or Best Ensemble) – Television Series is one of the Satellite Awards given by the International Press Academy.

== Winners ==
=== 2000s ===
Year	Winners	Cast members	Ref.
2000	The West Wing	Alan Alda • Stockard Channing • Kristin Chenoweth • Dulé Hill • Allison Janney • Moira Kelly • Rob Lowe • Joshua Malina • Mary McCormack • Janel Moloney • Richard Schiff • Martin Sheen • Jimmy Smits • John Spencer • Bradley Whitford	
2001	Buffy the Vampire Slayer	Amber Benson • Marc Blucas • David Boreanaz • Nicholas Brendon • Charisma Carpenter • Emma Caulfield • Sarah Michelle Gellar • Seth Green • Alyson Hannigan • Anthony Stewart Head • James Marsters • Michelle Trachtenberg	
2002	No Award		
2003	No Award		
2004	No Award		
2005	Rescue Me	Lenny Clarke • Charles Durning • Denis Leary • Michael Lombardi • James McCaffrey • Jack McGee • Steven Pasquale • Andrea Roth • John Scurti • Daniel Sunjata • Callie Thorne • Dean Winters • Robert John Burke	
2006	Grey's Anatomy	Justin Chambers • Eric Dane • Patrick Dempsey • Katherine Heigl • T. R. Knight • Sandra Oh • James Pickens, Jr. • Ellen Pompeo • Sara Ramirez • Kate Walsh • Isaiah Washington • Chandra Wilson	
2007	Mad Men	Bryan Batt • Anne Dudek • Michael Gladis • Jon Hamm • Christina Hendricks • January Jones • Vincent Kartheiser • Robert Morse • Elisabeth Moss • Kiernan Shipka • Maggie Siff • John Slattery • Rich Sommer • Aaron Staton	
2008	No Award		
2009	True Blood	Chris Bauer • Mehcad Brooks • Anna Camp • Nelsan Ellis • Michelle Forbes • Mariana Klaveno • Ryan Kwanten • Todd Lowe • Michael McMillian • Stephen Moyer • Anna Paquin • Jim Parrack • Carrie Preston • William Sanderson • Alexander Skarsgård • Sam Trammell • Rutina Wesley • Deborah Ann Woll	

=== 2010s ===
Year	Winners	Cast members	Ref.
2010	No Award		
2011	No Award		
2012	The Walking Dead	Sarah Wayne Callies • Lauren Cohan • Danai Gurira • Laurie Holden • Andrew Lincoln • Melissa McBride • David Morrissey • Norman Reedus • Chandler Riggs • Michael Rooker • Scott Wilson • Steven Yeun	
2013	Orange Is the New Black	Jason Biggs • Michael J. Harney • Michelle Hurst • Kate Mulgrew • Laura Prepon • Taylor Schilling	
2014	The Knick	Michael Angarano • Jeremy Bobb • Leon Brown • David Fierro • Matt Frewer • Eve Hewson • Grainger Hines • Andre Holland • Eric Johnson • Maya Kazan • Clive Owen • Juliet Rylance • Cara Seymour • Chris Sullivan	
2015	American Crime	W. Earl Brown • Richard Cabral • Caitlin Gerard • Felicity Huffman • Timothy Hutton • Regina King • Benito Martinez • Penelope Ann Miller • Elvis Nolasco • Johnny Ortiz	
2016	Outlander	Caitriona Balfe • Simon Callow • Steven Cree • Rosie Day • Frances de la Tour • Laura Donnelly • Andrew Gower • Sam Heughan • Nell Hudson • Gary Lewis • Graham McTavish • Tobias Menzies • Grant O'Rourke • Dominique Pinon • Richard Rankin • Clive Russell • Sophie Skelton • Lotte Verbeek • Stephen Walters • Stanley Weber	
2017	Poldark	Ruby Bentall • Caroline Blakiston • Christian Brassington • Ellise Chappell • Beatie Edney • Jack Farthing • Sean Gilder • John Nettles • Luke Norris • Heida Reed • Harry Richardson • Eleanor Tomlinson • Aidan Turner • Josh Whitehouse • Gabriella Wilde • Tom York	
2018	The Assassination of Gianni Versace: American Crime Story	Darren Criss • Penélope Cruz • Judith Light • Aimee Mann • Ricky Martin • Édgar Ramírez • Finn Wittrock	
2019	Succession	Brian Cox • Jeremy Strong • Sarah Snook • Kieran Culkin • Matthew Macfadyen • Nicholas Braun • Alan Ruck • Hiam Abbass • Peter Friedman • Natalie Gold • Dagmara Domińczyk • Arian Moayed • J. Smith-Cameron	

=== 2020s ===
Year	Winners	Cast members	Ref.
2020	The Good Lord Bird	Ethan Hawke • Hubert Point-Du Jour • Beau Knapp • Nick Eversman • Ellar Coltrane • Jack Alcott • Mo Brings Plenty • Daveed Diggs • Joshua Caleb Johnson	
2021	Succession		
2022	Winning Time: The Rise of the Lakers Dynasty		
2023	Succession		
2024	Feud: Capote vs. The Swans		
2025	Landman		
