= Lyle and Erik Menendez =

American murderers and brothers

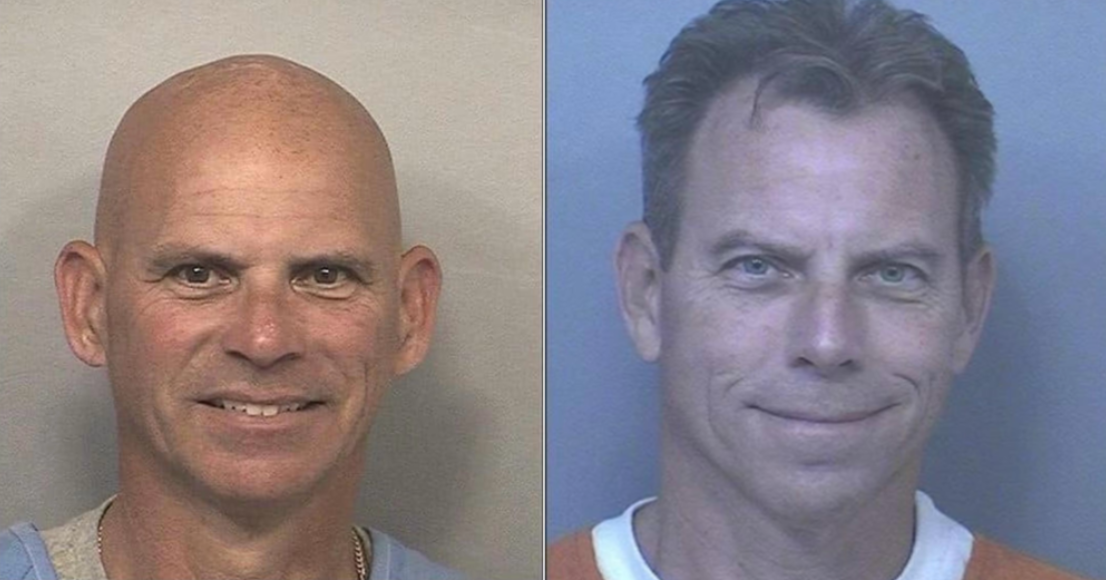
- Mug shots of Lyle (left) and Erik (right) Menendez taken in 2023
- Born: Joseph Lyle Menendez; January 10, 1968 (age 58); New York City, U.S. Erik Galen Menendez; November 27, 1970 (age 55); Gloucester Township, New Jersey, U.S.
- Education: Princeton University (Lyle; later dropped out); University of California, Irvine (BA) (both)
- Spouses: Lyle: Anna Eriksson (m. 1996; div. 2001); Rebecca Sneed (m. 2003; sep. 2024); Erik: Tammi Saccoman (m. 1999)
- Status: Incarcerated (both)
- Motive: Revenge for alleged sexual, emotional and physical abuse
- Convictions: First-degree murder with special circumstances (2 counts), conspiracy to commit murder (both)
- Penalty: Life in prison without the possibility of parole (both). Resentenced in May 2025 to 50 years to life (both).

Details
- Victims: José Enrique Menendez, 45; Mary Louise "Kitty" Menendez, 47
- Date: August 20, 1989
- Locations: Beverly Hills, California, U.S.
- Weapon: Mossberg 12-gauge shotgun
- Date apprehended: Lyle: March 8, 1990; Erik: March 11, 1990
- Imprisoned at: Richard J. Donovan Correctional Facility, San Diego County, California (both)

Joseph Lyle Menendez (born January 10, 1968) and Erik Galen Menendez (born November 27, 1970), most commonly referred to as the Menendez brothers, are American brothers convicted of killing their parents, José and Mary Louise "Kitty" Menendez, in their Beverly Hills home in 1989.

Following the murders, Lyle and Erik claimed that unknown intruders were responsible for the murders, framing it as a potential mob killing. Police initially investigated this claim but grew suspicious when they discovered the brothers' extravagant spending sprees following the murders, and the fact that they had hired a computer expert to delete their father's recently updated will. Erik confessed to the murders in sessions with his psychologist, citing a desire to be free of a controlling father with high standards, which led to their arrests months later.

Lyle and Erik were charged with two counts of first-degree murder with special circumstances for lying in wait, making them eligible for the death penalty, and charges of conspiracy to murder. During their first trial, the defense argued that the brothers killed their parents in self-defense after years of alleged sexual, emotional and physical abuse. The prosecution argued that the murders were premeditated, that allegations of sexual abuse were fabricated and that the brothers were motivated by hatred and a desire to receive their father's multimillion-dollar estate after being disinherited from his will. The juries were unable to reach a verdict, resulting in mistrials for both brothers. In a second trial, the brothers were convicted and sentenced to life imprisonment without the possibility of parole.

Beginning in 1998, Lyle and Erik began numerous successive legal appeals of their convictions, which were reviewed and rejected by judges. In October 2024, Los Angeles district attorney George Gascón recommended a resentencing after reviewing a habeas corpus petition. In May 2025, a judge resentenced the brothers to 50 years to life, making them eligible for parole. Lyle and Erik were denied parole in August 2025 due to incidents of rule breaking and deception. In September 2026, they were granted an early parole suitability hearing scheduled for March 2027.

The Menendez brothers' highly publicized trials received international media attention, inspiring numerous documentaries, dramatizations, books and parodies.

== Background ==
José Enrique Menendez (Note: Full name by birth: José Enrique Menéndez Llanio) was born on May 6, 1944, in Havana, Cuba, to parents José Francisco "Pepin" Menéndez and Maria Carlota Llanio Navarro. At age 15, in the wake of the Cuban Revolution, he moved to the United States. José attended Southern Illinois University, where he met Mary Louise "Kitty" Andersen (born October 14, 1941, in Oak Lawn, Illinois, to parents Charles Milton Andersen and Mae Helen Andersen née Maloney.) They married in 1963 and moved to New York City, where José earned an accounting degree from Queens College.

The couple's first son, Joseph Lyle, who goes by his middle name, was born on January 10, 1968, in New York City. Kitty quit her teaching job after Lyle was born, and the family moved to New Jersey, where Erik was born on November 27, 1970, in Gloucester Township. The family lived in Hopewell Township, and both brothers attended Princeton Day School.

José became an executive at Hertz Corporation and later RCA Records, where he signed numerous musical artists including Menudo and Eurythmics. After he was appointed as the CEO of Live Entertainment, a film studio and home video distributor, the family moved to Calabasas, California, where Erik attended Calabasas High School.

In 1988, Lyle and Erik committed multiple burglaries in their neighborhood, stealing more than $100,000 in cash and jewelry, prompting their parents to move to Beverly Hills. The following year, Erik attended Beverly Hills High School, where he earned average grades but displayed a talent for tennis, ranking 44th in the US as a junior. About two weeks before the murders, Erik and his friend Michael Joyce entered the 1989 Boys' Junior National Tennis Championship.

As a student at Princeton University, Lyle was placed on academic probation for poor grades and eventually suspended for plagiarism. He lived in the Gauss Hall, a dormitory, where he reportedly threw out his roommates' belongings as he did not wish to share a room, caused damage by leaving sinks overflowing and repainted his room in violation of university rules.

== Murders and investigation ==
=== Murders and alibi ===
On August 18, 1989, Lyle and Erik visited several Southern California gun stores to buy handguns. However, due to issues with Lyle's driver's license and a two-week waiting period mandated by gun laws, the brothers decided to purchase shotguns instead. They acquired Mossberg shotguns along with boxes of birdshot and buckshot ammunition in a Big 5 Sporting Goods store in San Diego, where Erik used a driver's license stolen from Lyle's friend, Donovan Goodreau.

On the evening of August 20, José and Kitty were watching The Spy Who Loved Me (1977) in the theater den of their Beverly Hills mansion, when Lyle and Erik entered, carrying loaded shotguns. José was shot six times, including a fatal shot to the back of his head. Kitty was shot ten times. Before the fatal shot to her cheek, Kitty was on the floor, crawling away. Lyle ran to the car where Erik handed him ammunition to reload before firing the fatal shot to her face.

Immediately after the killings, both brothers remained in the house for a few minutes, expecting a police response to the gunshot noise. They left to dispose of their blood-stained clothes and later buried the shotguns somewhere along Mulholland Drive. They also went to a movie theater and attempted to purchase tickets for the film Batman (1989) to use as their alibi but abandoned the plan when they realized the theater time-stamped its ticket stubs. They then headed to the "Taste of L.A." festival at the Santa Monica Civic Auditorium.

After returning home and finding no police presence, Lyle called 9-1-1 and emotionally told the operator, "Someone killed my parents!" saying that he had just come home and discovered their bodies. Erik was heard screaming and crying in the background. When officers arrived, Lyle and Erik ran from the home toward them while screaming. Police did not seek gunshot residue tests from the brothers, which would have indicated whether they had recently discharged a firearm. The brothers both falsely told officers that they were elsewhere at the time of the killings. Lyle told officers he thought the killings might be "business-related," implying a mob hit.

Police officers and forensic staff described the crime scene as "the most brutal" one they had ever encountered, noting blood and brain matter splattered throughout the room. Retired police detective Dan Stewart stated, "I've seen a lot of homicides, but nothing quite that brutal. Blood, flesh, skulls. It would be hard to describe, especially José, as resembling a human that you would recognize. That's how bad it was." According to the autopsy report, one blast caused "explosive decapitation with evisceration of the brain" and "deformity of the face" to José, while the first round of shots struck Kitty in her chest, right arm, left hip and left leg, with the contact shot causing "multiple lacerations of the brain."

=== Investigation and arrests ===
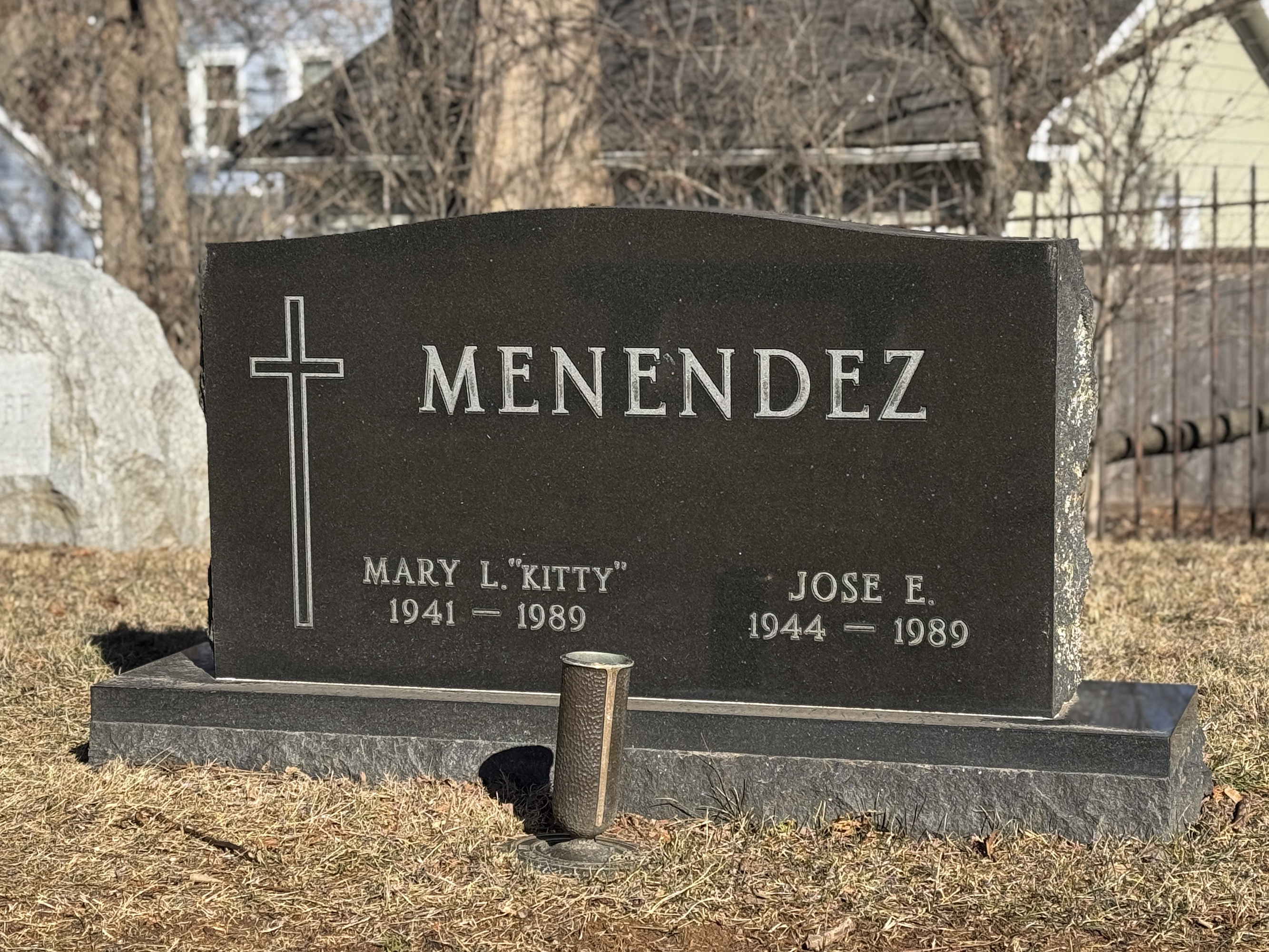
Kitty and José's shared gravestone at Princeton Cemetery in New Jersey

Detectives initially investigated Lyle's suggestion that the murders were a result of mob-related activity, due to its heinousness and José's business connections.

In the months after the killings, Lyle and Erik spent hundreds of thousands of dollars on luxury items, businesses and travel. Lyle bought Chuck's Spring Street Café, a Buffalo wing restaurant in Princeton, New Jersey, as well as three Rolex watches and a Porsche Carrera sportscar. Erik hired a full-time tennis coach and competed in a series of tournaments overseas. The brothers eventually left the Beverly Hills mansion unoccupied, choosing to live in adjoining condominiums in nearby Marina del Rey. They also dined at high-end restaurants and took overseas trips to the Caribbean and London.

The brothers' courtside attendance at a New York Knicks basketball game was captured in the background of a Mark Jackson trading card. During this time, they spent approximately $700,000. Most of this money came from a $650,000 personal life insurance policy, which was paid out. This spending caused police to begin considering the brothers as suspects, with a possible financial motive. Family members disputed a connection between their spending and the murder of their parents, asserting that there were no changes in their spending habits after the killings.

In high school, Erik had co-written an amateur screenplay titled Friends with a classmate, Craig Cignarelli, telling the story of a wealthy young man who commits the "perfect murder" by killing his parents for their inheritance. Cignarelli contacted police to report that Erik had confessed to him and also reported his and Erik's authorship of the Friends screenplay. In an attempt to get a recorded confession, police arranged for Cignarelli to wear a wire during a lunch with Erik. When Cignarelli asked whether he had killed his parents, Erik denied it.

Police also heard from Glenn Stevens, a friend of Lyle's, that one week after the killings, Lyle had made a sudden trip back home from Princeton to destroy something in the family computer. Stevens said that Lyle told him a family member "found a new will and I went there and erased it." A computer expert hired by Lyle also said he was hired to ensure deletion of a new will José had prepared which may have left less to his sons.

Erik eventually confessed to his psychologist, Jerome Oziel, who in turn told his mistress, Judalon Smyth. Oziel began recording his sessions with Lyle and Erik. After breaking up with Oziel, Smyth informed police about the brothers' involvement in the murders. Lyle was arrested on March 8, 1990, outside the Beverly Hills mansion, while Erik turned himself in three days later after returning to Los Angeles from Israel, where he had participated in a tennis tournament. Both were held without bail and jailed separately at the Los Angeles County Jail.

== Trials ==
=== Pretrial detention and legal disputes ===
In August 1990, Judge James Albracht ruled that tapes of the conversations between Erik and Oziel were admissible evidence, since Oziel claimed Lyle had threatened him and thus violated doctor–patient privilege. Albracht's ruling was appealed, after which the proceedings were delayed for two years. The Supreme Court of California ruled in August 1992 that most of the tapes were admissible, with the exception of the tape on which Erik discussed the murders.

After that decision, a Los Angeles County grand jury issued indictments in December 1992, charging the Menendez brothers with the murders of their parents; the special circumstances that the killings were committed for financial gain was deemed unsupported by evidence and was subsequently excluded from the charges. They were charged with two counts of first-degree murder with special circumstances for lying in wait, which made them eligible for the death penalty. On January 12, 1993, the prosecution announced they would seek the death penalty for the brothers, at a hearing presided over by Judge Lance Ito. At the same hearing, Ito assigned Stanley Weisberg to serve as the trial judge.

=== First trial (1993–1994) ===
Lyle and Erik's first trial began in July 1993; cameras were allowed in the courtroom and the trial was broadcast on Court TV. Represented by lead defense lawyers Leslie Abramson (for Erik) and Jill Lansing (for Lyle), the brothers stated that they had killed their parents out of fear for their lives after a lifetime of child abuse, especially sexual abuse at the hands of José, who was described as a cruel perfectionist and pedophile. Meanwhile, Kitty was described as an enabling, selfish, mentally unstable alcoholic and drug addict who encouraged her husband's behavior and was also violent toward the brothers.

Lyle alleged that José began abusing him when he was six years old, but stopped at age 8 without explanation. Erik alleged he was abused up until adulthood, shortly prior to the murders. Erik testified that two weeks before the killings, he first told Lyle about the sexual abuse he was experiencing, leading to multiple confrontations within the family.

Both brothers testified that José had threatened to kill them if they did not keep the abuse secret. As a result, they purchased shotguns for "protection and self-defense." They alleged that the final confrontation occurred in the den of the Beverly Hills mansion on August 20, 1989, shortly before José and Kitty were killed. According to their testimony, José closed the den's door, which they described as "unusual." They testified that they were afraid that they would be killed by their parents, so went outside to load their shotguns, and Erik recalled, "As I went into the room, I just started firing."

Under California law, the brothers could be eligible for conviction of manslaughter only if they could prove they were in immediate or imminent danger. The prosecution argued there was no evidence of imminent danger or self-defense. Prosecutor Pam Bozanich argued this was contradicted by the brothers purchasing shotguns in advance. Prosecutors used the taped conversation between the brothers and Oziel, in which the brothers said they had planned the murders "beforehand." They argued that the murders were inconsistent with a self-defense killing; after they had shot Kitty, who was "moaning and trying to crawl away," Lyle went to reload his shotgun and returned to complete the murder.

Prosecutors also argued that the sexual abuse allegations were fabricated, as nobody mentioned abuse taking place until a legal defense was being formulated seven months after the murders. Jurors were told that mention of sexual abuse was absent in discussions and tapes with Oziel, and that Erik did not mention abuse in his earlier confession to Cignarelli. The prosecution continually asserted throughout the trial that Lyle and Erik were capable of lying repeatedly and in great detail to avoid being caught, and thus were also capable of lying about child abuse to avoid the death penalty. Bozanich played Lyle's staged 9–1-1 call for the jurors with the intention of showing how good an actor he was.

Prior to the trial, Lyle offered to bribe his ex-girlfriend, Jamie Pisarcik, if she would lie on the stand and claim that José had made sexual advances towards her; Pisarcik reported this to police. Before Lyle was cross-examined by the prosecution, he pre-emptively admitted to this scheme under questioning by his own lawyer.

Lyle and Erik's cousin, Diane Vander Molen, testified that during a stay with the Menendez family in the summer of 1976, Lyle confided in her that José was sexually abusing him. Vander Molen claimed she told Kitty about the incident, but Kitty sided with her husband, accusing Lyle of lying. Vander Molen recalled that after this, Kitty sent Lyle upstairs, and she never heard of the issue again. Under questioning from Bozanich, Vander Molen stated she had never directly witnessed any abuse. Lyle testified that Vander Molen was the only person he ever told of the abuse. Another cousin, Andy Cano, alleged that as a child, Erik told him about the abuse, which they both described as genital "massages." Prosecutors pressed Cano, asking him if he would lie for his cousin, which he denied.

The defense presented two faceless photographs of young boys from the waist down, which Lyle alleged were taken by José when they were little. The prosecution argued that there was no evidence the photographs were taken by José, and the photos were found on a roll of film interspersed with photos from a children's birthday party.

Evidence from a taped therapy session between Lyle, Erik and Oziel was also presented in court, after legal attempts by the defense to exclude it. The prosecution used the tapes to disprove the abuse claims, as the brothers made no mention of sexual abuse, and instead complained about their dictatorial father and suicidal mother. Lyle also stated on the tape that by killing their mother, they were "doing her and [him and Erik] a favor... putting her out of her misery" and that they had "shown great courage by killing their mother." According to Oziel's account, "They didn't kill their parents for money but rather out of hatred and out of a desire to be free from their father's domination, messages of inadequacy and impossible standards." Oziel said that Lyle had confided that "he knew his father would have been proud of him for killing him" for pulling off the task.

The defense consultant Ann Burgess argued Oziel was "manipulative" and "controlling," arguing he directed many of the statements made by the brothers in the tape recordings. Oziel's ex-mistress, Judalon Smyth, also testified that Oziel wanted to "control" the brothers by taping their sessions. Smyth's testimony was challenged by the prosecution, noting she was the one who notified authorities of the confession tapes, but had now joined the defense to discredit Oziel after a tumultuous breakup.

Erik testified that he had put cinnamon in his father's tea and coffee to make his semen taste better. The plausibility of this claim was disputed because cinnamon is a detectable flavor. Prosecutor Lester Kuriyama proposed that José had not forced Erik into sex acts, but was furious that his son was potentially homosexual, and this may have caused tensions within the family. Judge Weisberg refused to allow Kuriyama to discuss the idea. The defense argued Kuriyama's idea was "disgusting," while Kuriyama argued it was relevant because one witness claimed to have seen gay porn magazines in the house, implying that José was sexually attracted to men; however, the meaning would change if they belonged to Erik. Erik alleged his mother "made it seem like it was worse than death to be gay, and I didn't think I was, I just—I don't know," and followed up by saying he liked girls and enjoyed his relationship with his girlfriend.

The prosecution wanted to allow the jury to see a screenplay that Erik had written with his friend Craig in high school, a story about a wealthy young man who killed his parents for the inheritance money. Judge Weisberg ruled against it, saying the play was written too long before the shooting to have relevance.

The defense also won a ruling against the use of the word "sociopath" in front of the juries. Oziel told the court he had explained to the boys the difference between a crime of passion and a crime of assault, and that in response they described themselves as "sociopaths." Weisberg said the label was too prejudicial to announce in front of the juries. A defense witness, psychologist Anne Tyler, described Erik's burglaries of more than $100,000 in cash and jewellery as the "acting out behavior" of an adolescent.

Both verdicts for the brothers were divided by gender; female jurors suggested voluntary manslaughter, while male jurors pushed for first-degree murder. After a month of deliberations, the trial ended in a mistrial in January 1994, due to the two deadlocked juries. Los Angeles County District Attorney Gil Garcetti opted to retry the brothers, as opposed to offering a plea bargain to secure convictions on lesser charges.

=== Second trial (1995–1996) ===
Lyle and Erik's second trial was less publicized, in part because Weisberg did not allow cameras in the courtroom because it would "increase the risk that jurors would be exposed to information and commentary about the case outside of the courtroom."

Erik testified over fifteen days his alleged abuse by José. He also alleged that José had told him he was written out of the will. Weisberg limited some of the testimony about certain allegations on the third day. He also limited the defense to sixty-four total witnesses in the retrial. Lyle did not testify in the second trial.

Pisarcik testified in regard to Lyle's attempted bribery in the first trial, claiming that Lyle told her fictitious stories about the mob killing of his parents, which she initially believed. Prosecutor David Conn told jurors that Lyle had asked a friend, Brian Eslaminia, to fabricate a story in the first trial. A seven-page letter found by police, allegedly written by Lyle, detailed how he wanted Eslaminia to testify. Prosecutors also presented another letter that Lyle had allegedly written, this time to his ex-girlfriend Traci Baker. It included instructions on how to testify, with the sentence: "We will decide later around what date this incident occurred." The defense disputed the letter's authenticity. Baker was not reached for comment.

Conn challenged Erik's allegation that he was raped at the age of 18, when he had a vehicle and enough money to leave his parents' home. Conn asked him why he did not join the United States Army. Erik said he would not be safe from his father in the military, because he was "the most powerful man I've ever met." Erik admitted there were no witnesses to his allegations of sexual abuse. Psychology professor John Wilson, an expert witness for the defense, testified that Erik had symptoms of post-traumatic stress disorder (PTSD) which supported his allegations of abuse. Psychiatrist Park Elliot Dietz, an expert witness for the prosecution, countered that there was no way to know if Erik had PTSD because the allegations were unproven. He argued Erik did not show symptoms of "learned helplessness," as he had purchased guns and practiced with them at the shooting range.

Leslie Abramson argued that the Menendez brothers acted out of fear that their parents would harm them for threatening to reveal the family's secrets, and that the killings were a "highly emotional overkill." Weisberg determined that there was insufficient evidence to support the claim that the brothers were in imminent danger when they murdered their parents. However, he allowed the defense to argue that the brothers shot José in the heat of passion, but not their mother Kitty. He concluded that while there was enough evidence to suggest José might have provoked his sons into committing homicide, there was not enough to indicate that Kitty had as well.

Klara Wright, wife of the attorney hired by Lyle and Erik, testified that they had brought a safe to her home in hopes of locating a copy of their parents' will. The safe was opened two days after the murders, in the presence of the brothers' uncles, Brian Andersen and Carlos Baralt; it was found to be empty. Conn argued this was evidence the brothers were trying to access their parents' money as quickly as possible.

Lyle and Erik Menendez were eventually convicted on two counts of first-degree murder with special circumstances for lying in wait, as well as conspiracy to murder; in the penalty phase of the trial, they were sentenced to life in prison without the possibility of parole.

During the penalty phase, Abramson reportedly told defense witness William Vicary to edit his own notes of meetings with Erik to remove potentially incriminating information, but the district attorney's office decided not to launch a criminal investigation in response. Both brothers filed motions for a mistrial, claiming that they suffered irreversible damage in the penalty phase as a result of possible misconduct and ineffective representation by Abramson. On July 2, 1996, Weisberg sentenced the Menendez brothers to life in prison without the possibility of parole, to be served as consecutive sentences for the killings and the charges of conspiracy to commit murder.

== Appeals ==
On February 27, 1998, the California Court of Appeal upheld the Menendez brothers' murder convictions and, on May 28, 1998, the Supreme Court of California declined to review the case, thus allowing the decision of the appellate court to stand. Both brothers filed habeas corpus petitions with the Supreme Court of California, which were denied in 1999. Having exhausted their appeal remedies in state court, they filed separate habeas corpus petitions in the United States District Court. On March 4, 2003, a magistrate judge recommended the denial of the petitions, and the district court adopted the recommendation. The brothers then decided to appeal to the United States Court of Appeals for the Ninth Circuit. On September 7, 2005, a three-judge panel denied both their habeas corpus petitions.

In May 2023, the brothers requested a new hearing based upon an allegation that José had raped former Menudo member Roy Rosselló, who was signed under RCA Records, the label where José had been an executive, at the time of the alleged assault. On an April 18, 2023, appearance on NBC's Today, Rosselló stated that he was drugged and raped by José while he was visiting the Menendez family's New Jersey home when he was aged 14. The 2023 appeal cites a 1988 letter that appears to have been written by Erik to his cousin, Andy Cano, in which Erik talked about the abuse. Author Robert Rand claimed to have found the letter in a dresser in Cano's bedroom in 2018.

On October 3, 2024, Los Angeles district attorney George Gascón announced in a press conference that his office was actively reviewing the appeal. On October 24, Gascón announced he was asking the court for a resentencing of the case. If a judge accepted his recommendation, the brothers would be eligible for parole. Gascón stated, "I don't believe that manslaughter would have been the appropriate charge given the premeditation that was involved," and, "I do believe that the brothers were subjected to a tremendous amount of dysfunction in the home, and molestation." Gascón's recommendation considered the length of time the Menendez brothers had already served, and their behavior while in prison.

A re-sentencing trial was initially scheduled to begin on December 11, 2024. However, during a court hearing on November 25, the trial would be pushed back to January 30 and 31, 2025. The resentencing hearing was postponed to March 20 due to the Los Angeles fires. On March 21, the hearing was once again pushed back to April 2025. On March 24, California Governor Gavin Newsom announced a June 13, 2025, deadline for the brothers' resentencing via his podcast This is Gavin Newsom.

Newly elected district attorney Nathan Hochman reversed Gascón's recommendations for resentencing and filed an opposition to the habeas corpus petition. Hochman called the claims of self-defense "self-serving lies" and stated that the letter allegedly sent to Cano was not credible, because it had not been used in either defense.

In May 2025, a judge resentenced the Menendez brothers to fifty years to life, making them eligible for parole because they were under twenty-six years old when they committed the murders. On August 21, 2025, Erik was denied parole by the California Board of Parole Hearings, citing ongoing rule violations and concerns about public safety. Lyle was also denied parole the following day, with the board referencing repeated cell phone infractions. Both brothers were granted an early second parole suitability hearing for March 2027.

== Marriages ==
On July 2, 1996, Lyle married Anna Eriksson via telephone at a ceremony attended by Abramson and his aunt Marta Menendez, officiated by Judge Nancy Brown; they divorced on April 1, 2001, after Eriksson discovered that Lyle was cheating on her by writing to another woman. In November 2003, Lyle married Rebecca Sneed at a ceremony in a visiting area of Mule Creek State Prison; they had known each other for around ten years before their engagement. Lyle and Sneed separated in 2024.

On June 12, 1999, Erik married Tammi Ruth Saccoman in the waiting room of Folsom State Prison. Tammi later stated: "Our wedding cake was a Twinkie. We improvised. It was a wonderful ceremony until I had to leave. That was a very lonely night." In an October 2005 interview with ABC News, she described her relationship with Erik as "something that I've dreamed about for a long time. And it's just something very special that I never thought that I would ever have."

In 2005, Saccoman self-published a book, They Said We'd Never Make It—My Life with Erik Menendez. She conceded on CNN's Larry King Live that Erik "did a lot of editing on the book." In an interview with People magazine, she also stated:

Not having sex in my life is difficult, but it's not a problem for me. I have to be emotionally attached, and I'm emotionally attached to Erik ... My family does not understand. When it started to get serious, some of them just threw up their hands.

Saccoman also stated that she and her daughter drove 150 mi (240 km) every weekend to visit Erik, and that her daughter refers to him as her "Earth Dad." Discussing his life sentence in a 2005 interview with People, Erik stated: "Tammi is what gets me through. I can't think about the sentence. When I do, I do it with a great sadness and a primal fear. I break into a cold sweat. It's so frightening I just haven't come to terms with it."

== In popular culture ==
- The Menendez brothers are seen in the background of the 1990–91 NBA Hoops' Mark Jackson basketball card, in which the New York Knicks point guard is seen making a bounce pass. They are sitting courtside behind Jackson. In December 2018, eBay began terminating auctions in which the brothers are mentioned in the listing. Some eBay sellers have continued to sell the card by altering the images accompanying the listing so that the Menendez brothers are neither mentioned nor seen in photos of the card accompanying the listing.
- Forensic psychiatrist Michael H. Stone analyzed the case of the Menendez brothers in his 2009 book The Anatomy of Evil in a chapter about crimes involving family members. Stone used his scale of evil to describe the Menendez case.
- In October 2024, the brothers participated in Netflix's You Can't Make This Up, an accompanying podcast to the documentary film The Menendez Brothers.

=== Documentary ===
- In 2000, "Menendez Brothers – Blood Brothers", an episode from the documentary series by Court TV (now TruTV) Mugshots, was aired at FilmRise.
- In 2015, Barbara Walters Presents: American Scandals featured the Menendez brothers in an episode, "Menendez Brothers: The Bad Sons".
- In 2017, the Menendez brothers were featured in a documentary, Truth and Lies: The Menendez Brothers – American Sons, American Murderers on ABC.
- In 2017, A&E aired a five-part documentary titled The Menendez Murders: Erik Tells All, in which Erik describes via telephone the murders and the aftermath. The series also shows never-before-seen photos and new interviews with prosecutors, law enforcement, close family and friends, and medical experts.
- In 2017, HLN launched the new series How It Really Happened – with Hill Harper, with an episode featuring the Menendez brothers story. The episode, "The Menendez Brothers: Murder in Beverly Hills", ends with a telephone interview of Lyle from jail with Chris Cuomo.
- In 2020, BuzzFeed Unsolved featured the Menendez brothers in a one-episode special, "How They Were Caught: The Menendez Brothers".
- In 2021, the Menendez brothers were the subject of ABC's 20/20 special, Inside the Menendez Movement. The special features the popularity of the brothers on the video-sharing social media application TikTok and their growing number of supporters from young adults outside and inside of the United States.
- In August 2022, Discovery+ released Menendez Brothers: Misjudged?, a two-hour documentary focusing on the Menendez brothers' case and trial.
- In May 2023, Peacock released a documentary series titled Menendez + Menudo: Boys Betrayed, which features Puerto Rican singer and former Menudo member Roy Rosselló alleging that he was sexually assaulted as a teenager by José Menendez.
- In March 2024, the case was the topic of the 48 Hours episode The Menendez Brothers' Fight for Freedom.
- In July 2024, the brothers were featured in the third episode of Mastermind: To Think Like a Killer.
- In October 2024, The Menendez Brothers, a documentary film featuring prison interviews with the brothers, was released on Netflix.

=== Dramatization ===
- In 1994, the Menendez brothers were depicted in the CBS miniseries Menendez: A Killing in Beverly Hills, with Lyle portrayed by Damian Chapa and Erik by Travis Fine.
- Also in 1994, the television film Honor Thy Father and Mother: The True Story of the Menendez Murders starred Billy Warlock and David Berón as Lyle and Erik, respectively.
- The case was dramatized in the Lifetime television film Menendez: Blood Brothers (2017). Lyle was portrayed by Nico Tortorella, and Erik by Myko Olivier. Courtney Love also starred as Kitty Menendez.
- Dick Wolf produced Law & Order True Crime: The Menendez Murders, which was released on NBC in 2017. Gus Halper and Miles Gaston Villanueva portrayed Erik and Lyle, respectively.
- Monsters: The Lyle and Erik Menendez Story, the second season of Ryan Murphy and Ian Brennan's Netflix anthology series Monster, was released in September 2024. Cooper Koch and Nicholas Alexander Chavez starred as Erik and Lyle, respectively. Koch received nominations for a Primetime Emmy Award and a Golden Globe Award for his performance.

=== References, parody, and dark comedy ===
- In 1990, the Law & Order season 1 episode "The Serpent's Tooth" is loosely based on the Menendez brothers case, although the show contains its usual disclaimer that the story and characters are fictional.
- Saturday Night Live parodied the Menendez brothers' first trial in the fourth episode of its 19th season, aired on October 23, 1993. Actor and host John Malkovich and comedian Rob Schneider starred as Lyle and Erik Menendez, respectively, accusing their identical twin brothers of murdering their parents.
- In the crime film Natural Born Killers (1994), archived footage of Erik's testimony from the first trial is included in the credits, which references various crime cases in the United States.
- The media hype surrounding the first trial was parodied in the dark comedy film The Cable Guy (1996), as well as satirizing Lyle's infamously staged 911 call.
- The case was referenced in the song "Hello Kitty Menendez" by the band The Mr. T Experience, originally appearing on the compilation 13 Soda Punx as well as on the 1997 reissue of the extended play Big Black Bugs Bleed Blue Blood.
- In 1997, Gary Indiana published his novel Resentment: A Comedy, which is drawn in part from the Menendez murders and trial.
- In George Carlin's final comedy special, It's Bad For Ya!, while discussing the phenomenon of people believing their deceased relatives can help them from beyond the grave, he states "I'll guarantee you, Mr. and Mrs. Menendez are not helping those two boys."
- In The Sopranos episode "Boca", Junior Soprano makes a reference to the brothers' case, citing how their psychiatrist had appeared as a witness in the trial.
- In the pilot episode of Gilmore Girls, Lorelai tells Rory to make it through dinner and then she can "pull a Menendez".
- In 2016, the Menendez brothers were mentioned several times in the FX drama The People v. O. J. Simpson: American Crime Story (2016). Based on O. J. Simpson's homicide case, the series was set at the same time as the Menendez brothers' trials. There are several characters who have worked in the brothers' and O. J. Simpson's respective cases, such as Robert Shapiro, Lance Ito, and Gil Garcetti. Shapiro (portrayed by John Travolta) mentioned Erik in Episode 2 stating, "In fact, I arranged the surrender of Erik Menendez from Israel." This statement is based on the actual speech by Shapiro during Simpson's infamous Bronco chase, in an attempt to have him surrender to police.
- On October 3, 2024, Kim Kardashian published an article on NBC news endorsing the push for Menendez brothers to be freed from prison. In this article, Kardashian states, "Had this crime been committed and trialed today, I believe the outcome would have been dramatically different."

== See also ==
- List of homicides in California
- Schoklender case – Caso Schoklender
- Stacey Lannert
- Trial of the century – Sensationalistic idiom for court cases
