= Legacies (Dallas) =

- Dallas episode
- Episode no.: Season 2 Episode 15
- Directed by: Steve Robin
- Written by: Cynthia Cidre; Robert Rovner
- Original air date: April 15, 2013

Guest appearances
- Marlene Forte as Carmen Ramos; Kevin Page as Steve "Bum" Jones; Alex Fernandez as Roy Vickers; Sam Anderson as Dr. David Gordon; Benito Martinez as Officer; Ken Kercheval as Cliff Barnes; Akai Draco as Sheriff Derrick; Marcus M. Mauldin as Detective Bota; Annalee Jefferies as Carina; Cody Daniel as Delivery Man; Karen Borta as Reporter

Episode chronology
← Previous "Guilt by Association"	Next → "The Return"

"Legacies" is the fifteenth episode and season finale in the second season (2013) of the television series Dallas. In the US it aired along with the final episode in the season, "Guilt by Association", functioning as a two-hour finale. It finally answered the question that was uttered in "The Furious and the Fast": Who shot J.R.?

== Plot ==
At Harris Ryland's house, Emma rummages through her father's desk in the study room. When Harris catches her, she tells him that she was searching for pills. He unlocks a safe and hands her some pills.

In Zurich, Switzerland, Christopher confronts Dr. David Gordon and Carina about cashing checks in his mother's name. The doctor explains to Christopher that he met Pam Ewing after the accident which resulted in burns to more than 60 percent of her body. Due to her disfigured appearance, she left Dallas out of fear of scaring Christopher. She sought the doctor's help in reconstructing her body. During the last round of surgeries, she learned that she had pancreatic cancer, which delayed her return to Dallas. Gordon brought Pam to Abu Dhabi to undergo an experimental cancer treatment. The treatment failed and she died shortly afterwards. Her brother, Cliff Barnes, realized that her one-third share of Barnes-Global would be given to Christopher in her will. Cliff requested that the doctor and Carina, Pam's nurse, keep the death a secret so that he could control Pam's shares in the company. In exchange, Cliff financially supported the doctor and the nurse over the years, making the Ewings believe that Pam was still alive for twenty-four years and uninterested in her family. Christopher receives Pam's will and a letter she wrote before her death.

Bobby, Pamela, John Ross go to the Dallas police station in an attempt to convince Roy Vickers to talk. Cliff summons Harris to his car for a private meeting, upset that Vickers was arrested. He threatens to expose Harris over his connection to the sabotage of the Ewing Energies methane rig. Harris leaves, assuring Cliff that he will handle the situation. Cliff makes a telephone call.

Pamela sees Vickers in jail. She asks him if he has any children. She mentions that she carried twins, one boy and one girl. She pleads with him to tell her whether her father, Cliff, had intentionally ordered the sabotage, knowing that she would be aboard. He tells her to have more children, forget about her father, and what happened on the methane rig was no accident. Later, two jail guards watch Vickers chatting on a telephone in a corridor. The guards leave after he finishes the conversation. Two inmates surround him and stab him in the neck. Watching the breaking news on television at Ryland's house, Harris tells Emma that he had nothing to do with the killing of Vickers. She hugs him, telling her father that she believes him.

Christopher returns to Dallas. Knowing about Pam's fate, the Ewing family comfort him at Southfork Ranch. Bobby leads him, John Ross, Pamela, and Sue Ellen to the study room. John Ross hands Pam's death certificate over to Christopher, which was discovered inside Cliff's safety deposit box. Christopher unveils his copy of Pam's will, securing his one-third share of Barnes-Global. Pamela declares she will use her one-third share of Barnes-Global to benefit the Ewings after uncovering her father's treachery in the death of her unborn children. John Ross reveals that he and Pamela got married in Las Vegas, surprising as well as eliciting congratulations from both Sue Ellen and Christopher.

Steve "Bum" Jones enters the room. Having secured two-thirds of Barnes-Global shares, Bobby reveals more details about J.R.'s master plan. Unlocking a wall safe, he removes a container encasing a handgun. Pamela recognizes it immediately as Cliff's gun. Bum tells them that Cliff had followed J.R. to Nuevo Laredo, Mexico, which caused J.R. to worry. Bum received a call from J.R., but had arrived too late to save him. Cliff had used the Mendez-Achoa cartel to cover his tracks, and Carlos Del Sol purchased the gun from them. Bum explains that the reason Cliff's role in J.R.'s murder wasn't revealed sooner was because J.R. had wanted Cliff to think that he had won, which would have given the Ewings enough time to take everything away from him. Bobby mentions the importance of having Cliff arrested in Mexico, the country where J.R.'s murder took place, since he would try to fight extradition. Pamela agrees to lure her father there.

Later, Elena encounters Christopher. She apologizes to him about her role in protecting her brother, Drew, who planted the explosives on the rig. He rejects her apology, demanding that Drew has to surrender to the authorities and declaring that there is no trust between them anymore. He storms out, joining his family as they prepare to travel to Mexico.

Excited about a potential business deal in Nuevo Laredo, Cliff rides with Pamela as they head to the airport. Cliff boards his private jet as she discreetly plants the handgun inside the trunk of his car. At Harris Ryland's house, Emma cooks breakfast. She crushes the pills, mixing them into the food, which she gives to her father. He passes out and she breaks into his safe. Police officers hand over a search warrant to a banker and open Cliff's safety deposit box, where they discover J.R.'s belt buckle. Emma locates a key and opens the safe in the study room. She takes a black steel suitcase and a logbook filled with important dates pertaining to the drug cartels connected to her father's company. The police stop Cliff's car and find the handgun in the trunk. Emma returns to Southfork and hands the logbook over to her mother, Ann. The police appear at Harris' doorstep and arrest him. Excavators exhume J.R.'s body and a bullet is removed from his corpse. Cliff's gun is dusted for fingerprints and a ballistics test confirm that the extracted bullet was fired from the weapon.

Inside a Mexican hotel room, Pamela intercepts a phone call from Cliff's secretary, Marlene, who wants to inform Cliff about the police search. Bobby, Christopher, John Ross, and Sue Ellen enter the room, surprising Cliff. Bobby declares an end to the Ewing-Barnes feud. Christopher tells his uncle that he knows about Pam's death and the contents of her will. He asserts his claim to one-third of Barnes-Global. Pamela confronts her father about his connection to Vickers. Cliff denies the link, stating that Vickers is a liar. She informs him that she is now married to John Ross, giving her husband access to one-third ownership of Barnes-Global. Sue Ellen notes that this situation makes Cliff a minority owner in the company and that the Ewings have regained control of Ewing Energies. Upset at this development, Cliff warns his daughter that she has made a grievous error in her young life.

The police enter the room to arrest Cliff. Sue Ellen mentions that the two bullets that were removed from J.R.'s exhumed body matched the type found in his gun. Benito Martinez, the police team leader, explains that the same gun was located in Cliff's car a few hours ago. Cliff claims that the gun was stolen from his locker at the shooting range a few weeks before J.R.'s murder. Martinez also points out that J.R.'s belt buckle was found in Cliff's safety deposit box and the flight log of Cliff's jet showed that he was in Mexico on the day of J.R.'s death. Cliff states that he was in Cabo and that someone must have moved his plane. As the police handcuff and remove Cliff, he asserts his innocence, claiming repeatedly that he did not kill J.R.

Bobby sees Cliff in a Mexican prison and offers a deal. If Cliff admits his role in killing their unborn grandchildren, assassinating Vickers, and conspiring with Harris to sabotage Ewing Energies, Bobby will help him get out of Mexico. Cliff rejects the deal, stating that he would be simply exchanging a Mexican prison for an American one. He boasts that he has never done anything that the Ewings have asked of him and he was not going to start now. As Bobby walks away, Cliff demands to know who killed J.R. Bobby tells him that he will never know.

Back in Dallas, Bobby and Bum visit J.R.'s grave. Christopher and John Ross join them. They confront Bobby, wanting to know what happened to J.R. Bobby tells them that Cliff killed J.R. They are not convinced and demand to know what was in J.R.'s letter. Bobby reads it. He discloses that J.R. was dying of cancer and had only days left to live. This news surprises both John Ross and Christopher. He further reveals that Bum stole Cliff's gun, and J.R. wanted to permanently end the Barnes-Ewing feud that began with Jock Ewing and Digger Barnes. J.R. admitted that Bum was his best friend, even though he did not deserve Bum's friendship. J.R. also admitted to using Jock's hunting rifle and pinning the blame on Bobby when they were kids. Bobby stops reading the letter and weeps. Christopher reads it. J.R. mentions that despite his sibling rivalry with Bobby over the years, he loved his brother and was ready to meet their deceased father and confess to him that he was the one who used the hunting rifle. Still confused, John Ross asks Bobby who killed his father. Bum admits that he was the one who reluctantly shot him, at J.R.'s request. He convinces John Ross that J.R.'s last act was an act of love. John Ross realizes that only his father could take himself down, and assures Bum that he understands that Bum was only following J.R.'s instructions. Alone at J.R.'s grave, John Ross clutches the letter and thanks his father for watching over the Ewings.

Inside her home, Elena talks with her mother about Cliff's arrest in J.R.'s murder. Elena mentions that her father's land had no oil. She believes that he wasted his entire life trying to extract the non-existent oil and her brother, Drew, also wasted his time trying to repurchase the land from the Ewings. She receives a package from Cliff which includes a land deed and a letter asking her to meet him.

Emma sees her father inside a Dallas jail. He blames the Ewings for her behavior. She informs him that he is the one whom she emulates. She stands up and walks away. When he sees Ann in the doorway, he scolds her for relishing his misfortune. Ann retorts that she is not as sadistic as he is.

Christopher reads his mother's letter at Southfork. Pamela meets him. She encourages him to forgive Elena and reunite with her.

Elena sees Cliff in the Mexican prison. He tells her that he knows a lot of information about her family, including the fact that her great-great grandfather's name was Augustine. In 1835, he purchased land in what would later become Dallas, but it was taken from him in the Mexican–American War. Elena's father purchased it back, hoping to strike oil. J.R. thought that the land was oil-rich, too. When Elena's father came back from Mexico to collect the land deed, he mentions that J.R. paid someone in the records office to switch the deeds, ensuring that he got the stretch of land belonging to her father that was oil-rich while Elena's father got the land that had no oil. She initially dismisses Cliff's accusation. He tells her that she can have the information verified independently, stating that the Ewings did the same thing to his father, Digger Barnes. She glances at the land deed, which contains the signatures of both J.R. and her father. Cliff tells her that he is unable to do anything from prison, but says that she can act as his proxy for the one-third of Barnes-Global that he still owns. He convinces her that the Ewings must pay for the land swindle against her family, hoping to start a Ewing-Ramos feud.

J.R.'s painted portrait hangs in the lobby area of the Ewing Energies office. John Ross, Bobby and Sue Ellen pay tribute to his legacy in front of the office staff. Ann meets Bobby and they leave together happily. Sue Ellen joins her son in his office. Basking in their triumph, she encourages him to join his wife, Pamela, stating it is never easy being a Ewing bride. John Ross kisses his mother on the cheek and leaves. She grabs a bottle of J.R.'s bourbon and walks away.

Christopher runs to Elena's house, hoping to talk with her. He professes his love. He enters and finds it empty. Elena drives to a barricaded fortress in Mexico. She talks through the intercom and requests to speak to a man known as Joaquin, her childhood friend. She enters the fortress which is staffed with armed guards.

John Ross prepares for his date. He carries a bouquet of flowers and a champagne bottle. Instead of encountering his wife, he sees Emma in the bedroom. She gives her father's black steel briefcase over to him. He unzips it and looks inside. She tells him that it will cost him. He says that he is willing to pay as long as his wife does not know about it. They kiss passionately and land on the bed. The episode ends with the phrase: "To Be Continued...", setting the stage for the show’s third season.
