= Jerome Oziel =

Psychologist

- Born: Leon Jerome Oziel; July 17, 1946 (age 80)
- Education: Arizona State University (PhD)
- Known for: Lyle and Erik Menendez's former therapist

Leon Jerome Oziel is a former psychologist who played a key role in the Menendez Brothers' murder trial. He had a private practice in Beverly Hills, California. In 1988, he became the psychotherapist for Erik and Lyle Menendez. His role as their therapist led to their arrest, and ultimately their conviction. Oziel's involvement in the case, as well as his history of professional misconduct, resulted in him surrendering his license in 1997. Oziel currently (2024-2025) has a career in New Mexico, focused on marriage mediation.

== Education and career ==
In 1972, Jerome Oziel received his doctorate in clinical psychology from Arizona State University.

After receiving his doctoral degree, he moved to South Carolina for the following two years. Oziel then moved to Beverly Hills, California to begin a private practice while being a professor at the University of Southern California. Oziel surrendered his clinical license in the state of California, in 1997. In previous years, there were investigations into his professional conduct after having an inappropriate relationship with a client, before 1988. The Menendez family sought Oziel’s professional help in 1988, for Erik Menendez and his burglary convictions, without knowing of Oziel's license suspension. While the law allows for reinstatement after surrender or revocation, no reinstatement is publicly documented for Oziel.

== Role in the Menendez brothers' case ==
Joseph Lyle Menendez and Erik Galen Menendez continued therapy with Oziel after their introduction in 1988. José and Mary Louise (Kitty) Menendez were killed on August 20, 1989. Months later, Erik Menendez contacted Oziel for an urgent session on October 31, 1989. During this session, Erik confessed to the murders of José and Kitty Menendez, which he carried out with his brother, Lyle Menendez. Oziel reported in his notes that Erik had thoroughly explained the planning and completion of their crime, as well as their constructed alibi. On November 2, Oziel invited both brothers to participate in therapy together, where they discussed the rationale behind their actions. Two more sessions were held on November 28 and December 11, 1989. Oziel's role in the case became central as the tapes were considered a key piece of evidence.

During the course of Jerome Oziel's relationship with Judalon Smyth, he shared details of the Menendez brothers' case with her outside of therapy. In early March 1990, Judalon Smyth went to the police to inform them about Oziel's tapes with the Menendez brothers; a magistrate from the Beverly Hills Judicial District issued a search warrant, which authorized the search of Leon Jerome Oziel's residence and office. In this search, the audio recorded tapes, which contained Lyle and Erik's confession, were seized. The seized items included three audiotape cassettes: the first contained Oziel's notes of sessions with the Menendez brothers on October 31 and November 2, 1989, the second contained notes from a session with Erik on November 28, 1989, and the third was a recording of an actual session with both brothers on December 11, 1989. Lyle and Erik were charged on March 12, 1990. Oziel attempted to assert psychotherapist-patient privilege, claiming that the contents of the tapes were confidential. This delayed the preliminary hearing. Oziel also attempted to claim that he was coerced into consenting to the search of his residence and office; this claim was denied and the tapes were later admitted.

As the case went on, The State brought affidavits, one of which being from Judalon Smyth, Oziel's lover and former patient. Both Smyth and Oziel testified in court. The State, through the Los Angeles District Attorney, filed against the psychotherapist-patient privilege order in August 1990. Despite this, the psychotherapist-patient privilege was awarded, and the tapes remained confidential for over 2 years while the courts went back and forth with protection orders.

Later, Oziel claimed he had reason to believe Lyle and Erik to be dangerous, as they had made threats towards him, his wife Laurel Oziel, and his lover Judalon Smyth. This claim would allow the psychotherapist-patient privilege to be nullified. As an act to protect himself, he claimed that if he disclosed information from the tapes, he would be harmed, which was why he didn't go to the police—though he informed both Laurel Oziel and Judalon Smyth separately as warnings. In 1992, the courts allowed a majority of the tapes to be used as evidence in the case after Oziel mentioned the threats towards him and both women. Furthermore, attempts to discredit Oziel were made during the trial, made both by Erik's defense attorney Leslie Abramson, and later, Judalon Smyth, for having inappropriate relations with clients. Oziel denied these claims.

Finally, after the recordings were released as evidence, the Menendez brothers were tried in June 1993, where they pleaded not guilty. This trial resulted in a mistrial, as the jury failed to come to a decision. The brothers were re-tried in October 1995, and found guilty in March of 1996.

== Legal and professional fallout ==
Jerome Oziel's involvement in the Menendez case ultimately led to severe professional and legal repercussions. Due to the nature of the trial and evidence presented by Oziel, his credibility as a therapist was called into question and accusations of ethical misconduct mounted in the years following the Menendez trial. In January 1997, Oziel surrendered his California psychology license rather than facing a formal disciplinary hearing conducted by the California Board of Psychology, despite denying all of the allegations against him. In surrendering his license, he fully ended his career as a licensed psychologist in the state of California.

The central issue surrounding claims of Oziel's misconduct was his misuse in handling confidential therapy material. He permitted his mistress, Judalon Smyth, to eavesdrop and record confidential therapeutic materials obtained during a session with Lyle and Erik Menendez. This material was later disclosed to authorities without proper consent. Due to the nature of these actions, this is a direct violation of professional obligations and American Psychological Association ethical codes implemented to safeguard client information while maintaining confidentiality. Additionally, Oziel faced sexual exploitation allegations of female patients, including those under his care. He also faced allegations tied to improper dispensing of prescription drugs.

The surrendering of Oziel's California psychology license came after discovering that Oziel's behavior violated various ethical codes outlined by the American Psychological Association. First, his disclosure of the Menendez brothers' sessions and unauthorized recordings of each session violated APA codes Standard 4.01: Maintaining Confidentiality and Standard 6.02: Maintenance, Dissemination, and Disposal of Confidential Records. Moreover, Oziel faced a variety of sexual misconduct allegations, thereby violating APA codes Standards 10.05 and 10.06: Sexual Intimacies With Current/Former Therapy Clients. Oziel's personal relationship with Judalon Smyth presented a pattern of misconduct and clouded his professional judgement, violating APA code Standard 2.06: Personal Problems and Conflicts. More broadly, his conduct inflicted harm on patients and the profession, violating Standard 3.04: Avoiding Harm as well.

== Later life ==
As of September 2024, Oziel lives and works in Albuquerque, New Mexico where he focuses on helping couples improve their relationships as a marital mediation guide. In a 2024 email to Vanity Fair, Oziel stated that he moved on from the Menendez trial decades ago and that his current life has no connection to it anymore.

== Publications ==
- Cerbus G; Oziel LJ (1971). "Correlation of the Bender-Gestalt and WISC for Negro children". Perceptual and Motor Skills. 32 (1): 276. doi:10.2466/pms.1971.32.1.276. PMID 5548083. Wikidata Q71767938.
- F. W. Obitz; L. J. Oziel (1978). "Change in general and specific perceived locus of control in alcoholics as a function of treatment exposure". Substance Use and Misuse. 13 (6): 995–1001. doi:10.3109/10826087809039319. PMID 730409. Wikidata Q67429008.
- Oziel LJ; Oziel LD; Cohen RH (1972). "Effects of instructional set on production of creative responses". Psychological Reports. 31 (1): 93–94. doi:10.2466/pr0.1972.31.1.93. PMID 5055925. Wikidata Q52324816.
- Obitz FW; Oziel LJ (1972). "Varied information levels and accuracy of person perception". Psychological Reports. 31 (2): 571–576. doi:10.2466/pr0.1972.31.2.571. PMID 5081348. Wikidata Q70502173.
- Oziel LJ; Berwick PT (1974). "Effects of feedback on self-reinforcing behavior in relation to self-acceptance". Psychological Reports. 34 (3): 1039–1044. doi:10.2466/pr0.1974.34.3c.1039. PMID 4418695. Wikidata Q52316826.
- Munjack DJ; Kanno PH; Oziel LJ (1978). "Ejaculatory disorders: some psychometric data". Psychological Reports. 43 (3 Pt 1): 783–787. doi:10.2466/pr0.1978.43.3.783. PMID 570286. Wikidata Q36569703.
