= Stanley Weisberg =

American judge (born 1943)

Judge of the Los Angeles County Superior Court
- In office 1988–2008
- Appointed by: George Deukmejian

Personal details
- Born: 1943 (age 82–83) East Los Angeles, California, U.S.
- Spouse: Jacqueline Weiss (m. 1985; died 2018)
- Education: University of California, Los Angeles (B.A., J.D.)
- Occupation: Attorney; judge

Stanley Martin Weisberg (born c. 1943) is an American retired judge and prosecutor. He served as a judge on the Los Angeles County Superior Court from 1988 to 2008, where he became known for presiding over trials of the police officers charged with the beating of Rodney King and of brothers Lyle and Erik Menendez in the trial for the murder of their parents. In several cases, he made controversial rulings that were subject to criticism.

== Early life, education and career ==
Born in East Los Angeles, Weisberg's father was a sheet metal worker. Weisberg attended Alexander Hamilton High School in Los Angeles, from which he graduated in 1961, and received a B.A. in political science from the University of California, Los Angeles in 1965, followed by a J.D. from UCLA School of Law in 1968. From 1968 and 1986, Weisberg served as a deputy district attorney for Los Angeles County. During this period, he handled a series of prominent cases, such as the prosecution of Marvin Pancoast for the murder of Vicki Morgan and of Ricky Kyle for the murder of his millionaire father.

== Judicial service ==
In 1986, California Governor George Deukmejian appointed Weisberg to the municipal court of Los Angeles County. In 1988, Deukmejian elevated Weisberg to the Superior Court. One of Weisberg's first cases there was the McMartin preschool trial, where operators of a preschool in Manhattan Beach, California were charged with numerous acts of sexual abuse of children in their care. Weisberg reported that District Attorney Ira Reiner improperly tried to contact Weisberg to discuss a media report of the trial, but Weisberg refused to return Reiner's call. The contact became an issue during Reiner's unsuccessful campaign for the office of California Attorney General. In 1990, Weisberg declared a mistrial in the McMartin case, after jurors were unable to reach a verdict.

Weisberg also presided over the murder trials of Hare Krishna member Thomas Drescher, who had murdered a critic of the sect, and of Los Angeles police officer-turned contract killer William Leasure. Weisberg was assigned the Rodney King beating case in 1991. Among the rulings Weisberg made in that case was a decision barring the attorneys from holding news conferences, which some observers assert "led inevitably to misleading media coverage of the case". Weisberg also decided to locate the trial in Simi Valley, which in turn dictated the mostly white socioeconomic makeup of the jury pool which would decide the case. The case ended with the acquittal of the officers charged with beating King, prompting the 1992 Los Angeles riots.

Weisberg was assigned to preside over the trial of the Menendez brothers in 1993 and presided over two trials of their case, the first having ended in a hung jury. The two Menendez brothers trials "engendered a running debate" over Weisberg's conduct as trial judge "and the influence that television may, or may not, have had on his rulings". Weisberg allowed cameras in the courtroom for the first trial but barred them from the second, where he also disallowed many defense motions that he had allowed in the first trial. The trial gained national attention and Weisberg himself was parodied on Saturday Night Live, where he was portrayed by Phil Hartman. The Menendez brothers were convicted in the second trial and on July 2, 1996, Weisberg sentenced the two to life in prison without the possibility of parole.

Weisberg retired from the judgeship in 2008. In the 2017 Law & Order True Crime depiction of the Menendez brothers trial, Weisberg was portrayed by Anthony Edwards. In Monsters: The Lyle and Erik Menendez Story (2024), he was portrayed by Ross Mackenzie.

== Personal life ==
In 1985, Weisberg married Jacqueline Levit Weiss, who had been appointed to the Los Angeles County Superior Court in 1979. When he joined her on the Superior Court in 1988, they became the first married couple to each serve on the court in the county's history. Jacqueline Weisberg died in 2018.
