= Law & Order True Crime =

2017 American true crime anthology series

- Also known as: Law & Order True Crime: The Menendez Murders
- Genre: True crime; Anthology
- Created by: René Balcer
- Starring: Edie Falco; Miles Gaston Villanueva; Gus Halper
- Composer: Atli Orvarsson
- Country of origin: United States
- Original language: English
- No. of seasons: 1
- No. of episodes: 8

Production
- Executive producers: René Balcer; Dick Wolf; Peter Jankowski; Arthur W. Forney
- Running time: 43 minutes
- Production companies: Universal Television; Wolf Films

Original release
- Network: NBC
- Release: September 26 – November 14, 2017

Related
- Law & Order franchise

Law & Order True Crime is an American true crime anthology series that premiered on NBC on September 26, 2017. The series was ordered by NBC on July 15, 2016, and is part of the Law & Order franchise. Created by René Balcer, the eight-episode first season, titled Law & Order True Crime: The Menendez Murders, is a dramatization of the trial of Lyle and Erik Menendez, who were convicted in 1996 for the murder of their parents, José and Kitty Menendez. As of 2026, the series is on hiatus.

== Cast and characters ==
=== Main ===
- Edie Falco as Leslie Abramson, the defense attorney who represented Lyle and Erik Menendez.
- Gus Halper as Erik Menendez, the younger brother
- Miles Gaston Villanueva as Lyle Menendez, the older brother

=== Recurring ===
- Anthony Edwards as Judge Stanley Weisberg who oversaw Lyle and Erik's trial.
- Julianne Nicholson as Jill Lansing, Abramson's partner on the defense team for the first trial.
- Harry Hamlin as Barry Levin, Abramson's co-counsel on the second trial of Erik Menendez.
- Constance Marie as Marta Cano, José's sister.
- Carlos Gómez as José Menendez, Lyle and Erik's father.
- Sam Jaeger as Detective Les Zoeller, the Beverly Hills Police Department detective who investigated the murders of José and Kitty Menendez.
- Josh Charles as Dr. Jerome Oziel, Lyle and Erik's psychiatrist.
- Sterling Beaumon as Glenn Stevens, Lyle's friend from Princeton University.
- Ben Winchell as Donovan Goodreau.
- Molly Hagan as Joan Vandermolen, Kitty's older sister.
- Dominic Flores as Henry Llano, Lyle and Erik's cousin.
- Lolita Davidovich as Kitty Menendez, Lyle and Erik's mother.
- Chris Bauer as Tim Rutten, Leslie's husband and a Los Angeles Times journalist.
- Heather Graham as Judalon Smyth, Oziel's emotionally fragile mistress.
- Elizabeth Reaser as Deputy District Attorney Pam Bozanich, who was assigned to the murders of José and Kitty Menendez.
- Larry Cedar as Milton Andersen, Kitty's older brother.
- Ezra Buzzington as Deputy District Attorney Elliott Alhadeff, first prosecutor in case.
- Raphael Sbarge as Jon Conte.
- Taylor Kalupa as Anna Eriksson, Lyle’s fiancé & eventual wife.
- Jenny Cooper as Megan Lang.
- Irene DeBari as Maria Menendez, Lyle and Erik's grandmother.

=== Guest starring ===
- Douglas Olsson as Robert Shapiro, Erik's lawyer (prior to Leslie Abramson) who arranged his surrender from Israel.

=== Cameo appearance ===
- Dominic Daniel as O. J. Simpson, who is accused of murdering his ex-wife and her friend. He is shown to be jailed beside Erik, but only a voice is present during the conversations. He made an appearance in episode 8 when the news showed his actual verdict.

== Episodes ==
=== Season 1: The Menendez Murders (2017) ===
No.	Title	Directed by	Written by	Original release date	US viewers (millions)
1	"Episode 1"	Lesli Linka Glatter	René Balcer	September 26, 2017	6.06
José and Kitty Menendez are murdered in their home. The police initially investigate the double-homicide with links to José Menendez's business that has ties to organized crime, as brothers Lyle and Erik go on a shopping spree leading up to their parents' memorial service. But as the detectives run down leads the evidence points the crime to a different direction, the Menendez brothers. And while watching the events unfolding in the media, criminal defense attorney Leslie Abramson takes an interest in the murders and the brothers.
2	"Episode 2"	Lesli Linka Glatter	René Balcer	October 3, 2017	4.82
Detectives Zoeller and Linehan from the Beverly Hills Police Department begin interviewing the brothers' friends and acquaintances in the awakening of Jose and Kitty's murder. Meanwhile, Erik makes a shocking confession to his psychologist that could change how the case goes. Defense attorney Abramson learns more about the Menendez family dynamics and history and makes the move to represent the brothers in the upcoming court trial.
3	"Episode 3"	Holly Dale	Gina Gionfriddo	October 10, 2017	4.72
Whilst Lyle and Erik are in police custody for suspicion of murdering their parents, defense attorney Leslie Abramson works endlessly to understand what could possibly drive two young men to commit such a horrible crime as murdering their parents. Meanwhile, the prosecution tries to get the video and audio tapes from Lyle and Erik's sessions with their psychologist, which eventually reveals a shocking secret the family has been hiding from everyone for a very long time.
4	"Episode 4"	Holly Dale	Diana Son	October 17, 2017	4.36
Erik and Lyle begin to tell the horrific details of the psychological, verbal and sexual abuse they suffered from the hands of their parents throughout their lives. Meanwhile, Leslie Abramson makes a case for Dr. Oziel's tapes to be thrown out of court. Pam Ferrero faces increased pressure from the DA's office regarding the trial of Erik and Lyle.
5	"Episode 5"	Fred Berner	René Balcer	October 24, 2017	4.61
An extremely heightened level of public scrutiny emerges in the media and court system when Judge Weisberg allows the proceedings to be publicly broadcast on television regarding Erik and Lyle's upcoming court trial. The questionable ethics and motives of one of the star witnesses threaten Judge Weisberg's credibility in the case. Meanwhile, Leslie Ambrason starts struggling with her own personal demons as a result of stress from the case.
6	"Episode 6"	Fred Berner	Gina Gionfriddo	October 31, 2017	3.53
After a long period of time, Erik and Lyle finally testify for the first time in front of the jury. Leslie makes a surprising move in the trial after Judge Weisberg approves the unsealing of the brothers' confession tapes. The closing arguments are made, and the verdict is left for the jury to decide.
7	"Episode 7"	Michael Pressman	Diana Son	November 7, 2017	4.08
After hearing the closing arguments from the defense side and the ADA, the juries both struggle to reach a unanimous decision in the troubled case. Garcetti tries to counteract the declining public perception of the criminal justice system. Judge Weisberg's performance and credibility in the trial comes under extremely intense media scrutiny and attention.
8	"Episode 8"	Michael Pressman	René Balcer	November 14, 2017	4.16
A second trial commences with Barry Levin joining the defence side to represent the two brothers. Intense political collusion reaches an apex in the case. Judge Weisberg denies Lyle and Erik's family members to testify in the trial. Meanwhile, Leslie discovers revealing information about Jose and Kitty's childhoods. At last, a verdict is decided by the jury and all parties in the case return to court for the final time to hear it.

== Production ==
In April 2016, Dick Wolf and NBC announced they were working on the series, with the first season being based on the Menendez brothers' murder case. In February 2017, it was announced that Edie Falco will portray defense attorney Leslie Abramson. Gus Halper and Miles Gaston Villanueva joined the cast in May 2017 as Erik and Lyle Menendez, respectively. Among those who auditioned for Erik is Cooper Koch, who would later be cast in the same role in the 2024 limited series Monsters: The Lyle and Erik Menendez Story. Filming for the series began on June 26, 2017 for an eight-episode first season.

== Reception ==
=== Critical response ===
On Rotten Tomatoes, the season has an approval rating of 64% based on 34 reviews, with an average rating of 6.6/10. The site's critical consensus reads, "Law & Order: True Crime: The Menendez Murders benefits from a standout performance from Edie Falco that proves captivating enough to compensate for a staid approach to potentially drama-rich material." On Metacritic, the season has a weighted average score of 57 out of 100, based on 29 critics, indicating "mixed or average reviews". In his series of reviews of each episode, Austin Considine of the New York Times wrote that this mini-series succeeded in bringing something new and compelling to the well-known Menéndez case.

=== Ratings ===
The series ranked 41st in the key demographic of 18–49 age range with an average of 1.7 rating during the 2017–18 television season. The series also had an average of 6.73 million viewers, and was the 62nd most watched TV show of the season.

No.	Title	Air date	Ratings/share (18–49)	Viewers (millions)	DVR 18–49	DVR viewers (millions)	Total 18–49	Total viewers (millions)
1	"Episode 1"	September 26, 2017	1.6/6	6.06	1.0	2.70	2.6	8.76
2	"Episode 2"	October 3, 2017	1.1/5	4.82	0.9	2.49	2.0	7.31
3	"Episode 3"	October 10, 2017	1.1/4	4.72	0.6	2.14	1.7	6.86
4	"Episode 4"	October 17, 2017	1.0/4	4.36	0.6	2.18	1.6	6.54
5	"Episode 5"	October 24, 2017	1.0/4	4.61	0.6	2.03	1.6	6.64
6	"Episode 6"	October 31, 2017	0.7/3	3.53	0.6	2.05	1.3	5.58
7	"Episode 7"	November 7, 2017	0.9/4	4.08	0.6	2.06	1.5	6.14
8	"Episode 8"	November 14, 2017	0.9/4	4.16	0.6	1.85	1.5	6.01

=== Awards and nominations ===
Year	Award	Category	Nominee(s)	Result	Ref.
2018	Primetime Emmy Awards	Outstanding Lead Actress in a Limited Series or Movie	Edie Falco	Nominated	
2018	Imagen Awards	Best Actor - Television	Miles Gaston Villanueva	Nominated	
2018	Imagen Awards	Best Supporting Actor - Television	Carlos Gomez	Nominated	

== Future ==
A second season is yet to be confirmed, but Dick Wolf mentioned he has plenty of ideas for the show and a possible storyline if there is a second season. "This is unique for me, after 27 years of Law & Order," Wolf told TV critics at TCA in an interview. "This is taken from the headlines; we've made some great shows ripped from the headlines, but this is on a different level." An idea for a second season storyline includes the Oklahoma City bombing of 1995. "Just before the [Television Critics Association summer press tour], I had mentioned to him the Tim McVeigh case, and his eyes lit up," René Balcer says of Wolf's reaction. "Because Dick and I were together, we were in the same office when the bomb went off in Oklahoma."

== See also ==
- American Crime Story, a similar true crime anthology series that depicts high-profile cases
- Manhunt: Unabomber, the first season of Discovery Channel's true crime anthology series Manhunt
- Monsters: The Lyle and Erik Menendez Story, the second season of Netflix's true crime anthology series Monster
