= Stacey Lannert =

American murderer

- Born: Stacey Ann Lannert; May 28, 1972 (age 54); St. Louis, Missouri, U.S.
- Occupations: Founder and counselor, Healing Sisters support group/non-profit, St. Louis, MO
- Status: Released
- Motive: Sexual abuse
- Conviction: First degree murder
- Penalty: Life imprisonment; commuted to 20 years imprisonment

Stacey Ann Lannert (born May 28, 1972) is an American woman convicted of the murder of her father, Tom Lannert, when she was 18 years old. She testified that he had sexually abused her since she was eight years old. Sentenced to life in prison without the possibility of parole, she served 18 years.

On January 10, 2009, outgoing Missouri Governor Matt Blunt commuted Lannert's sentence and that of another woman convicted under similar circumstances. He said, "After an exhaustive review of the facts in both cases, I am commuting the sentences of Stacey Lannert and Charity Carey, who suffered extensive abuse before they took action against the men who raped them and subjected them to other horrible physical and emotional abuse." Lannert's new sentence of 20 years made her eligible for immediate conditional release, and she was released on January 16, 2009.

Lannert founded a resource website and non-profit organization, Healing Sisters, to aid women who have suffered abuse. In 2011, she published a memoir about her experiences, Redemption: A Story of Sisterhood, Survival, and Finding Freedom Behind Bars.

== Early life and education ==
Stacey Lannert was born in St. Louis, Missouri in 1972, the daughter of Deb Underwood and Thomas Lannert. She has said that she was close to her father and he made her feel special, but he was drinking to excess and started sexually abusing her when she was eight, and raped her at nine. Her parents divorced when she was young. Although she tried to tell her mother and a babysitter about her father's rapes, she did not have the language to make them understand, and he had threatened her to keep her quiet. Her sister Christy, two years younger, has said their father physically abused and beat her from when she was in first grade, becoming especially violent when drinking.

Stacey Lannert went to live with her mother, then in Guam, six months before the murder. Her sister Christy begged her to return, and Lannert tried to persuade her father to let Christy live with her and her mother. He would not let her go.

== The crime and the trial ==
At the age of 18, in the town of St. John, Missouri, Lannert shot her father twice while he was sleeping on a sofa. After confessing to killing him, she said that he had repeatedly raped and abused her as a child, threatening her so she would maintain secrecy. She said that, based on fears for her sister, she had decided to kill him to stop him.

She testified that on July 4, 1990, she and her sister got home late, entering the house via a basement window at approximately 4:15–4:30 a.m. Seeing a rifle, she decided to kill her father. Finding her father asleep on the sofa, she shot him. This shot broke his collarbone and startled him awake. In fear, Stacey closed her eyes and shot again. The next day, she consulted with an adult friend, who encouraged her and helped her to dispose of the murder weapon. She called the police, initially pretending to have found her father dead on the sofa upon returning home, but then confessed the murder to Lt. Tom Schulte, saying it was because of the years of abuse she had suffered.

Stacey Lannert was charged with first degree murder and other felonies. Lannert's lawyer offered the defense of insanity or mental defect after his attempt to use the "battered spouse syndrome" in her defense. In a pre-trial ruling, the court limited mention of "battered spouse syndrome" but allowed the defendant to make "an offer of proof of self-defense". The St. Louis County prosecutor, Bob McCulloch, never called Schulte to testify, although he was the first official to talk with Lannert and had years of experience with sexual abuse victims.

The prosecutors alleged that she murdered her father because she wanted his money. Lannert claimed that her father had sexually abused her from the age of eight. She said although she had reported the abuse to her guidance counselor, babysitter, and psychiatrist, no one took action to help her.

During his instructions to the jury, the judge refused to include any claim of self-defense: "[Under] Missouri law, the self-defense argument was not valid because she wasn't in actual danger at the moment she pulled the trigger." The judge concluded that there was not any basis in the evidence for her claim of self-defense.

Despite several expert witnesses having testified and agreed during Lannert's trial (and later appeal) that Lannert showed signs of abuse, the jury found her guilty on December 15, 1990, and later in 1992 and sentenced her to life imprisonment, without (as required by applicable law) the possibility of parole.

Her sister, Christy, was tried and convicted of conspiracy to commit murder. She was sentenced to five years' imprisonment. She was released on parole after serving two and a half years.

== Time served and appeals ==
After the judge's sentencing, some members of the jury expressed outrage that facts of sexual and physical abuse suffered by Lannert had not been introduced at the trial. The presiding judge, the Hon. Steven H. Goldman, issued this statement regarding Stacey Lannert's case:

[The] sentence is severe for a 20 year old. It is also somewhat surprising considering the evidence of sexual abuse by the victim's father...[a] conventional life sentence would be more appropriate from a comparison standpoint.

The Missouri Court of Appeals found in favor of the trial judge. The United States Court of Appeals for the Eighth Circuit, issued this statement after Lannert filed a petition for appeal:

The 'absence of aggression or provocation on the part of the defender' element of the Missouri self-defense statute does not articulate a time frame during which the initial act of aggression and the act of self-defense must occur. It is therefore deeply troubling that the jury was not completely informed of the scope of the abuse Lannert suffered, her fear, or her rage that her sister may also have been victimized by their father. This evidence of battered spouse syndrome might have placed Lannert's actions in proper context, and may have allowed a jury to conclude that Lannert was not the initial aggressor on the night of her father's death, potentially resulting in a very different outcome than what she faces today."

On March 11, 2003, the court ruled in favor of the original trial judge, though "reluctantly." It held that Lannert's appeal failed before the cited standards:

Deadly force may be used in self-defense only when there is (1) an absence of aggression or provocation on the part of the defender, (2) a real, or apparently real, necessity for the defender to kill in order to save himself from an immediate danger of serious bodily injury or death, (3) a reasonable cause for the defender's belief in such necessity, and (4) an attempt by the defender to do all within his power consistent with his personal safety to avoid the danger and the need to take a life.

The court rejected Lannert's position that "a man who raped his daughter, when she was in the third grade, made him 'the initial aggressor', and the author of his own doom". More crucially, the court noted that the battered spouse syndrome does not amount to a defense in itself, but is a support for a claim of self-defense, indicating the frame of mind in which the defendant finds herself at the time of the act. The court declined to override Missouri's rules for jury instruction or interpretation of the battered spouse syndrome law.

Lannert, after exhausting all of her appeals, sought from Missouri Governor Matt Blunt either commutation of her sentence to life in prison with the possibility of parole after 15 years (she had already served 18 years) or pardon. She had gained support for clemency. On January 10, 2009, the outgoing governor announced the commutation, after completing an "exhaustive review of the evidence," in which he determined that Lannert had suffered extensive abuse by her father, Thomas Lannert. In view of time served, Stacey Lannert was soon released from prison. McCulloch has said he does not believe her claims of abuse.

Lannert was described as having been a 'model prisoner,' active in many different community projects, as well as helping other survivors of incest and abuse. She also trained service dogs for the handicapped, in addition to being president of the Outreach program; an organization that brings troubled teens to prison to meet inmates with the incentive to warn them to take a different path in life.

Stacey Lannert has since founded Healing Sisters, a resource website and non-profit organization to aid women who have suffered abuse, as well as to work to end sexual abuse in the United States. She has appeared as a guest on The Oprah Winfrey Show on May 14, 2009; The Joy Behar Show on March 16, 2011; and Piers Morgan Tonight on April 20, 2011. In 2011 she published a memoir, written with Kristen Kemp: Redemption: A Story of Sisterhood, Survival, and Finding Freedom Behind Bars.
