= Leslie Abramson =

American criminal defense attorney (born 1943)

- Born: Leslie Hope Abramson; October 6, 1943 (age 82); New York City, U.S.
- Education: Queens College; UCLA School of Law (JD)
- Occupation: Attorney
- Spouse: Tim Rutten (divorced)
- Children: 2

Leslie Hope Abramson (born October 6, 1943) is a retired American criminal defense attorney best known for her role in the legal defense of Lyle and Erik Menendez. She is also a published author.

== Early life and education ==
Abramson was born in Flushing, Queens, New York City to Jewish immigrant parents. She graduated from Queens College and in 1969 received a Juris Doctor (J.D.) from UCLA School of Law.

== Career ==
=== Early career ===
In 1970, Abramson was admitted to the State Bar of California. She began her career in the Los Angeles County Public Defender's office, where she worked for six years.

She entered private practice as a defense attorney in 1976, and developed a reputation as a fierce advocate for her clients. She was twice named trial lawyer of the year by the L.A. Criminal Courts Bar Association. Over the course of her career, only one client that she represented received the death penalty – a multiple murderer named Ricky Sanders, who shot eleven people in a walk-in freezer in a Bob's Big Boy restaurant, killing four of them.

In 1988, Abramson was able to obtain a verdict of manslaughter with a sentence of probation, rather than murder, for 17-year old Arnel Salvatierra, who had killed his father. Abramson argued that the father had been abusive.

In 1990, Abramson won the acquittal of Dr. Khalid Parwez, a Pakistani-born gynecologist accused of strangling and dismembering his 11-year-old son, presenting an alibi for Parwez, and arguing that Parwez's brother, who had returned to Pakistan, was the likely culprit.

=== The Menendez trial ===
Abramson gained national attention in the early 1990s, when she represented Erik Menendez in his trial for the murder of his parents, again presenting parental abuse as the defense for the crime alleged. She stirred controversy when William Vicary, Erik's psychiatrist, testified that she had him delete and rewrite passages of his notes. When asked by the judge about it, she twice invoked her Fifth Amendment right against self-incrimination, and later asserted that any discussions were protected by attorney–client privilege. As a result, an investigation was launched by the state bar. Following a three-year investigation, the state bar closed its case "after deciding that there was insufficient evidence to conclude she violated ethical rules in Menendez brothers' retrial."

=== Post-Menendez career ===
In 1997, Abramson published a book, The Defense Is Ready: Life in the Trenches of Criminal Law. In 2004, she was hired by Phil Spector, who was charged with fatally shooting actress Lana Clarkson at his suburban Alhambra, California mansion, replacing his former attorney, Robert Shapiro. She resigned from representing Spector over conflicts between them. Spector was later convicted of murder with different counsel.

== In popular culture ==
- In 1993, while the Menendez trial was still ongoing, she was parodied on Saturday Night Live, where she was portrayed by Julia Sweeney, along with John Malkovich and Rob Schneider as Lyle and Erik Menéndez. Sweeney portrayed Abramson again the following year as a talk show host defending the actions of Tonya Harding (played by Melanie Hutsell) and Slobodan Milošević (played by Patrick Stewart).
- In the 1994 television film Menendez: A Killing in Beverly Hills, Abramson is portrayed by Margaret Whitton.
- In the 1994 made-for-television film Honor Thy Father and Mother: The True Story of the Menendez Murders she was portrayed by actress Susan Blakely.
- The character portrayed by actress Tracey Ullman, Sydney Kross, a high-profile Beverly Hills attorney, in the HBO sketch-comedy series Tracey Takes On..., was inspired by Abramson.
- In 2017, Edie Falco portrayed Abramson in the first season of Law & Order True Crime, based on the Menendez trial. Falco was nominated for a Primetime Emmy Award for Outstanding Lead Actress in a Limited Series or Movie for the role.
- Ari Graynor portrayed Abramson in the 2024 Netflix series Monsters: The Lyle and Erik Menendez Story, the second season of Monsters.

== Personal life ==
Abramson was married to a pharmacist with whom she had a daughter, Laine. They divorced in 1969. She married Los Angeles Times reporter Tim Rutten and the couple adopted a son. They divorced in 2007. Rutten and Abramson remained close until he died in September 2022.
