= Howard Koch =

Howard Koch is the name of:

- Howard Koch (screenwriter) (1901–1995), American screenwriter
- Howard W. Koch (1916–2001), American film and TV producer, director
- Hawk Koch (born 1945), American film producer, son of Howard W. Koch
