= San Diego Film Critics Society Award for Best Adapted Screenplay =

Annual US film award

The San Diego Film Critics Society Award for Best Adapted Screenplay is a film award given by the San Diego Film Critics Society.

== Winners ==
=== 1990s ===
Year	Winner	Writer(s)	Source
1997	L.A. Confidential	Curtis Hanson and Brian Helgeland	novel by James Ellroy
1998	A Simple Plan	Scott B. Smith	novel by Scott B. Smith
1999	Election	Alexander Payne and Jim Taylor	novel by Tom Perrotta

=== 2000s ===
Year	Winner	Writer(s)	Source
2000	Chocolat	Robert Nelson Jacobs	novel by Joanne Harris
2001	Ghost World	Daniel Clowes and Terry Zwigoff	comic book series by Daniel Clowes
2002	Adaptation.	Charlie and Donald Kaufman	book by Susan Orlean
2003	American Splendor	Shari Springer Berman and Robert Pulcini	comic book series by Harvey Pekar and comic book series by Joyce Brabner
2004	Sideways	Alexander Payne and Jim Taylor	novel by Rex Pickett
2005	Capote	Dan Futterman	novel by Gerald Clarke
2006	Thank You for Smoking	Jason Reitman	novel by Christopher Buckley
2007	There Will Be Blood	Paul Thomas Anderson	novel by Upton Sinclair
2008	Slumdog Millionaire	Simon Beaufoy	novel by Vikas Swarup
2009	Fantastic Mr. Fox	Wes Anderson and Noah Baumbach	novel by Roald Dahl

=== 2010s ===
Year	Winner	Writer(s)	Source
2010	The Social Network	Aaron Sorkin	novel by Ben Mezrich
2011	Moneyball	Steve Zaillian and Aaron Sorkin	book by Michael Lewis
2012	Argo	Chris Terrio	The Master of Disguise by Tony Mendez; The Great Escape by Joshuah Bearman
2013	Before Midnight	Richard Linklater, Julie Delpy, and Ethan Hawke	Characters created by Richard Linklater and Kim Krizan
2014	Gone Girl	Gillian Flynn	novel by Gillian Flynn
2015	Room	Emma Donoghue	novel by Emma Donoghue
2016	Love & Friendship	Whit Stillman	novel by Jane Austen
2017	The Disaster Artist	Scott Neustadter and Michael H. Weber	book by Greg Sestero and Tom Bissell
2018	The Death of Stalin	Peter Fellows, Armando Iannucci, Ian Martin, and David Schneider	La Mort de Staline by Fabien Nury and Thierry Robin
2019	Luce	J.C. Lee and Julius Onah	Luce by Julius Onah

=== 2020s ===
Year	Winner	Writer(s)	Source
2020	The Father	Christopher Hampton and Florian Zeller	Le Père by Florian Zeller
2021	The Power of the Dog	Jane Campion	novel by Thomas Savage
2022	All Quiet on the Western Front	Edward Berger, Lesley Paterson, and Ian Stokell	novel by Erich Maria Remarque
2023	Are You There God? It's Me, Margaret.	Kelly Fremon Craig and Judy Blume	novel by Judy Blume
2024	Sing Sing	Clint Bentley and Greg Kwedar	The book The Sing Sing Follies by John H. Richardson & the play Breakin' the Mummy's Code by Brent Buell
2025	Bugonia	Will Tracy	The film Save the Green Planet! by Jang Joon-hwan
