= Cooper Koch =

American actor (born 1996)

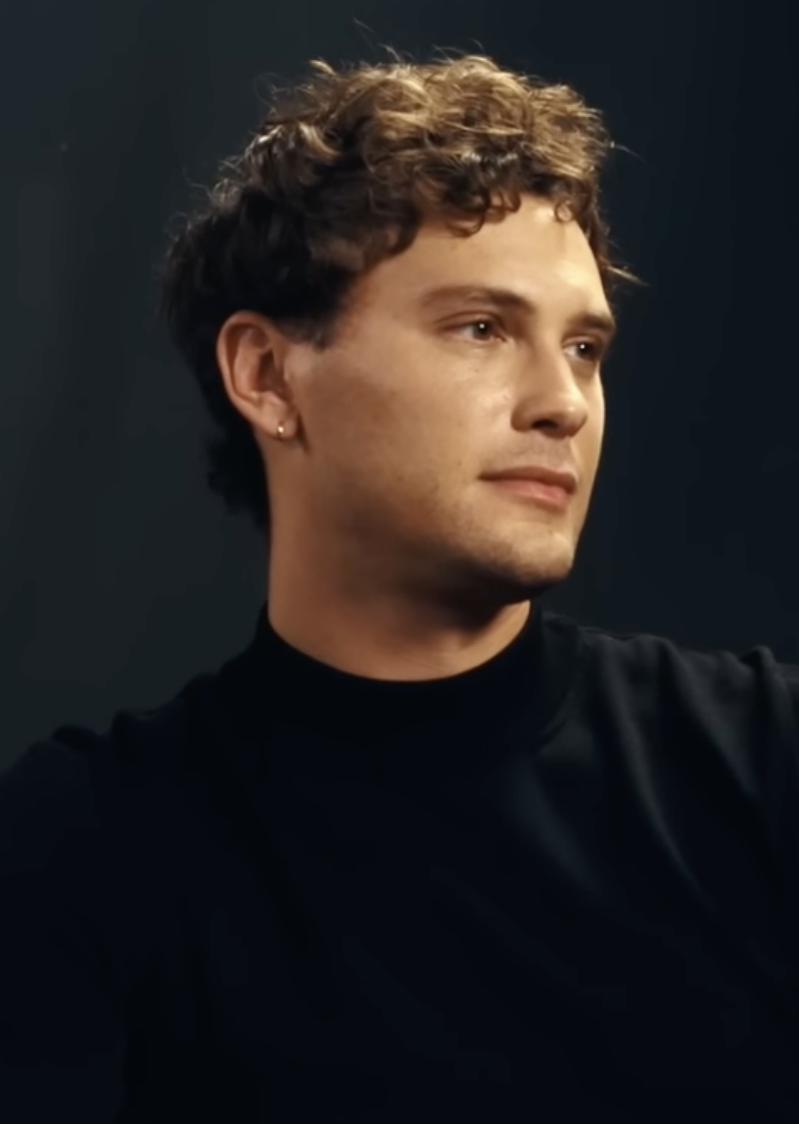
- Koch in 2024
- Born: Cooper Joseph Koch; July 16, 1996 (age 30); Los Angeles, California, US
- Education: Pace University (BFA)
- Occupation: Actor
- Years active: 2007–present
- Partner: Stuart McClave (2024–present)
- Mother: Kathy Kaehler
- Relatives: Payton Koch (twin brother); Hawk Koch (grandfather); Howard W. Koch (great-grandfather)

Cooper Joseph Koch (/kɒtʃ/ KOTCH; born July 16, 1996) is an American actor. He is best known for his portrayal of Erik Menendez in the biographical crime drama series Monsters: The Lyle and Erik Menendez Story (2024), for which he earned nominations for a Primetime Emmy Award and a Golden Globe Award. His film credits include the slasher film They/Them and the body horror film Swallowed (both 2022), Luca Guadagnino's biographical comedy drama Artificial (2026), and the upcoming noir drama Fog City and the Mike Flanagan-produced psychological body horror Rot.

== Early life and education ==
Cooper Joseph Koch was born on July 16, 1996, in Woodland Hills, Los Angeles, to a family involved in the film industry. His father, Billy Koch, who is of Jewish Russian descent, is the founder and owner of the horse racing club Little Red Feather and previously worked as a production assistant in numerous films. His mother, Kathy Kaehler, is a celebrity personal trainer. He has a twin brother, Payton Koch, who is a film editor, and a younger brother, Walker, who is a musician. His grandfather is film producer Hawk Koch, and his great-grandfather was film producer and director Howard W. Koch, both of whom served as presidents of the Academy of Motion Picture Arts and Sciences. His paternal great-granduncle was Charles Pincus, (Note: Pincus was the brother of Koch's great-grandmother, Ruth Koch (née Pincus).) a California dentist known for inventing the dental veneer in 1928. Koch's great-uncle is businessman and former Democratic politician Alan Blinken. (Note: Blinken was married to Koch's great-aunt, Melinda Blinken (née Koch), until her death in 2021.)

Koch began acting in local theater productions at the age of five. He later attended Calabasas High School, where he performed in various stage adaptations such as West Side Story and A Midsummer Night's Dream. He was also a member of the school's a cappella group and orchestra, where he played the viola, as well as the boys' volleyball varsity team. In May 2018, he earned a Bachelor of Fine Arts degree in acting from Pace University.

== Career ==
Koch made his on-screen debut with a background role in the 2007 film Fracture, which was produced by his grandfather, Hawk Koch. In 2010, he appeared in the music video for "Ordinary Girl" by Miley Cyrus (performing as her character, Hannah Montana). From 2017 to 2021, Koch primarily appeared in short films and stage productions. He had a guest role in the episode "Forty Candles" of the comedy series West 40s (2018), and he was cast in Hulu's series adaptation of Bret Easton Ellis's novel Less than Zero, although the pilot was not picked up. In 2019, he starred in the Off-off-Broadway play Head First, for which he won the award for Outstanding Lead Performance in a Play at the Fresh Fruit Festival. He later starred in the television film A New York Christmas Wedding (2020), playing Azrael Gabison, a guardian angel who shows a woman an alternate version of her life. He also appeared in two episodes of the crime drama series Power Book II: Ghost.

In 2022, Koch starred in Carter Smith's body horror film Swallowed, which earned the Grand Jury Prize at the 2022 NewFest. He portrayed Benjamin, an aspiring gay pornographic actor who is forced to smuggle mysterious drugs by swallowing them. That same year, he starred in the Blumhouse Productions slasher film They/Them, playing Stu, a closeted gay jock who attends an LGBTQ conversion therapy camp.

Koch first auditioned for the role of convicted murderer Erik Menendez in the NBC limited series Law & Order True Crime: The Menendez Murders and the Lifetime television film Menendez: Blood Brothers (both 2017). He later earned the part in Monsters: The Lyle and Erik Menendez Story (2024), the second season of Netflix's true crime anthology series Monster. His performance received critical acclaim, particularly in the fifth episode, "The Hurt Man", a 34-minute one-shot of Erik detailing the sexual abuse he suffered from his father. Critics highlighted his portrayal as one of the season's standout performances, and he received praise from Lyle and Erik Menendez. The role earned him nominations for the Primetime Emmy Award for Outstanding Lead Actor in a Limited or Anthology Series or Movie and the Golden Globe Award for Best Actor – Miniseries or Television Film.

In October 2024, Koch signed with United Talent Agency for representation. In July 2025, he was cast in Luca Guadagnino's biographical comedy-drama film Artificial, based on the brief dismissal of Sam Altman as CEO of OpenAI. The film premiered at the New York Film Festival on October 5, 2026. On March 4, 2026, he starred in a presentation for a Broadway revival of the comedy play The Little Dog Laughed.

In July 2026, Koch was cast as Police Inspector Steven Walsh in the upcoming noir drama film Fog City, directed by Dan Pritzker. In September 2026, he was cast in the lead role of the psychological body horror film Rot, directed by Alexandra Magistro in her feature directorial debut and produced by Mike Flanagan. The film began principal photography in November of the same year.

=== Other ventures ===
Koch has collaborated with various luxury brands such as Yves Saint Laurent, Tiffany & Co., Armani, Ralph Lauren, Montblanc, Tod's, and Schiaparelli. In June 2024, he fronted Gap's summer collection alongside Japanese actress Kiko Mizuhara. In November 2024, he starred in the short film Togetherness, as part of a campaign by fashion house Yves Saint Laurent. In May 2025, he fronted Calvin Klein's Summer Essentials/Pride Month campaign. In 2026, he starred in the short film Postcards from Italy, directed by Roman Coppola, as part of a campaign by Montblanc. Koch has also modeled for Skechers, Patagonia, and Abercrombie & Fitch while signed with Wilhelmina Models.

== Personal life ==
Koch is gay; he came out during college and has spoken about experiencing difficulties with self-acceptance after being bullied during his youth. He has also said that early in his acting career he faced challenges obtaining roles due to his sexuality and his "gay voice". Since 2024, he has been in a relationship with filmmaker Stuart McClave.

== Filmography ==
Key
†	Denotes films that have not yet been released

=== Film ===
Year	Title	Role	Notes	Ref.
2007	Fracture	Kid		
2017	Mine	Cody	Short film	
2018	Me Da La Lata	Andreas Lousche	Short film	
2018	The Latent	Matthew	Short film	
2018	Decadeless	Richard	Short film	
2019	Daddy	Bellhop	Short film	
2021	4 Floors Up	The Stranger	Short film	
2022	Swallowed	Benjamin		
2022	They/Them	Stu		
2026	Artificial	Patrick		
TBA	Fog City †	Steven Walsh	Post-production	
TBA	Rot †	Marshall	Filming	

=== Television ===
Year	Title	Role	Notes	Ref.
2018	West 40s	Boy on train	Episode: "Forty Candles"	
2019	Less Than Zero	Julian	Unaired TV pilot	
2020	A New York Christmas Wedding	Azrael Gabison	TV Movie	
2020	Power Book II: Ghost	Chase	2 episodes	
2024	Monsters: The Lyle and Erik Menendez Story	Erik Menendez	Main role	
2026	RuPaul's Drag Race All Stars	Himself	Guest judge; Episode: "Tournament of All Stars Talent Rumble"	

=== Theater ===
Year	Title	Role	Venue	Notes	Ref.
2019	Head First	Kyle	Wild Project	Off-off-Broadway	

=== Music video ===
Year	Song	Artist	Role	Ref.
2010	"Ordinary Girl"	Hannah Montana	Love interest	
2015	"Reflection"	Towkio		

== Awards and nominations ==
Year	Award	Category	Nominated work	Result	Ref.
2019	Fresh Fruit Festival	Outstanding Lead Performance in a Play	Head First	Won	
2024	GQ Men of the Year Awards	International Actor of the Year	Monsters: The Lyle and Erik Menendez Story	Won	
2024	The Daily Californian's Arts Awards	Best Actor in a Drama – Television	Monsters: The Lyle and Erik Menendez Story	Won	
2025	Golden Globe Awards	Best Actor in a Limited Series, Anthology Series, or a Motion Picture Made for Television	Monsters: The Lyle and Erik Menendez Story	Nominated	
2025	Queerty Awards	Best TV Performance	Monsters: The Lyle and Erik Menendez Story	Nominated	
2025	Dorian Awards	Best TV Performance – Drama	Monsters: The Lyle and Erik Menendez Story	Nominated	
2025	Gold Derby TV Awards	Best Limited/Movie Actor	Monsters: The Lyle and Erik Menendez Story	Nominated	
2025	Gold Derby TV Awards	Breakthrough Performer of the Year	Monsters: The Lyle and Erik Menendez Story	Nominated	
2025	Primetime Emmy Awards	Outstanding Lead Actor in a Limited or Anthology Series or Movie	Monsters: The Lyle and Erik Menendez Story	Nominated	
2025	Online Film & Television Association TV Awards	Best Actor in a Motion Picture, Limited or Anthology Series	Monsters: The Lyle and Erik Menendez Story	Nominated	
