= A Simple Plan =

A Simple Plan may refer to:

- A Simple Plan (novel), 1993, by American novelist Scott Smith
- A Simple Plan (film), 1998, based on the novel of the same name
- "A Simple Plan", a song by Matt Brouwer from the 2005 album Unlearning

== See also ==
- Simple Plan, a pop punk band
  - Simple Plan (album)
- The Simple Plan, a 2022 EP by August is Falling
- SIMPLE IRA, a type of retirement plan in the US
