= Hawk Koch =

American film producer (born 1945)

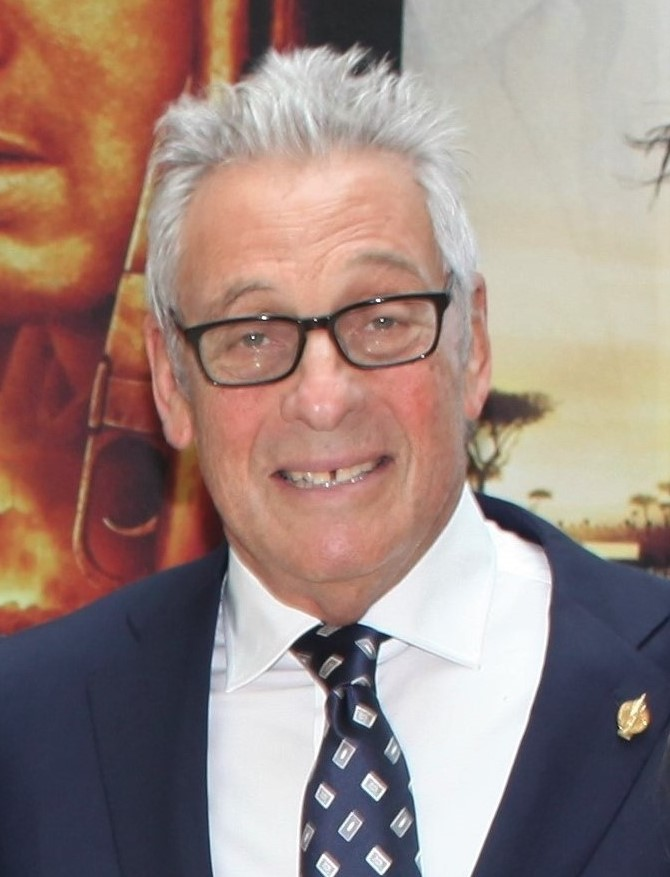
- Koch in 2014
- Born: Howard Winchel Koch Jr. December 14, 1945 (age 80); Los Angeles, California, U.S.
- Occupation: Film producer
- Spouses: Rita Litter (m. 1967, divorced) Marcia (div. 1983) Molly Jordan Koch (m. 1998)
- Children: 3
- Father: Howard Winchel Koch Sr.
- Relatives: Alan Blinken (brother-in-law); Kathy Kaehler (daughter-in-law); Cooper Koch (grandson); Payton Koch (grandson)

Howard Winchel Koch Jr. (born December 14, 1945), also known as Hawk Koch, is an American film producer. A former president of the Academy of Motion Picture Arts and Sciences and the Producers Guild of America, he was involved in the production of over 60 major films, including Rosemary's Baby (1968), The Way We Were (1973), Chinatown (1974), Heaven Can Wait (1978), Gorky Park (1983), Wayne's World (1992) and its 1993 sequel, Primal Fear (1996), Collateral Damage (2002), Fracture (2007), and Source Code (2011). He is currently a board member for AMC Entertainment, the Motion Picture and Television Fund, and the National Film Preservation Foundation.

Koch is a former road manager for the musical groups The Supremes and The Dave Clark Five. In 2019, he published his memoir, Magic Time: My Life in Hollywood.

== Early life and education ==
Koch was born on December 14, 1945 in Los Angeles, California, the son of Ruth (née Pincus), who is of Russian Jewish background, and filmmaker Howard Winchel Koch Sr. He was raised in a Secular Jewish family. He graduated from Beverly Hills High School in 1963, and later attended University of California, Los Angeles, before dropping out during his freshman year.

== Career ==
Hawk Koch began his career in London, working for music impresario and co-owner of The Dave Clark Five Harold Davison, as a road manager for visiting American acts. Koch returned from London to manage The Dave Clark Five's 1964 United States tour. After his time in the music business, Hawk Koch turned to filmmaking in Hollywood, working as assistant director for a number of directors and later as a producer.

Koch has been intimately involved with the making of more than 60 major motion pictures, including Chinatown, Heaven Can Wait, Marathon Man, The Way We Were, Primal Fear, Wayne's World, Peggy Sue Got Married, and Rosemary's Baby. His colleagues and collaborators have included Sidney Pollack, Roman Polanski, John Schlesinger, Francis Ford Coppola, and Warren Beatty. Hawk has worked with Natalie Wood, Laurence Olivier, Dustin Hoffman, Jack Nicholson, Barbra Streisand, Anthony Hopkins, Whoopi Goldberg, Diane Lane, Edward Norton, and Halle Berry.

At the Producers Guild of America (PGA), Koch and co-president Mark Gordon led the fight to preserve the producer's credit and secured all the major film studios and major independent film studios to agree to uphold the Producer's Mark (p.g.a.). In 2010, Koch and Gordon were the first pair of co-presidents to be elected by the PGA membership. The duo was re-elected in 2012.

On July 31, 2012, Koch was elected president of the Academy of Motion Picture Arts and Sciences, making Hawk and his father the only father-son pair to lead the Academy in its history. On August 1, 2012, Koch took leave from his post at the PGA in order to assume the Academy's presidency, later rejoining Mark Gordon as PGA co-president in August 2013. During his tenure at the Academy, Koch spearheaded several initiatives including a call for diversity, launching the first general membership meeting in its history, sharpening the focus on member engagement and the future of filmmaking, implementing the Academy's digital voting system, and securing major fundraising for the Academy Museum of Motion Pictures.

Koch has given one-on-one talks with Francis Coppola, Tom Cruise, and Jake Gyllenhaal at the annual Produced by Conference, and he has been a featured speaker at the Sarajevo Film Festival, the South Dakota Film Festival, and the Beijing International Film Festival. He delivered the 2013 commencement address at Chapman University Dodge College of Film and Media Arts, and was a featured speaker at the 2019 Renaissance Weekend.

Koch is a vocal advocate for diversity and representation in film and television as well as diversity within the entertainment industry's professional guilds and organizations. As of 2020, Koch serves on the board of directors for AMC Entertainment, Cast and Crew, the Motion Picture and Television Fund, the Producers Guild of America, and the National Film Preservation Foundation.

== Personal life ==
Koch dated Sondra Locke after the collapse of her relationship with Clint Eastwood. He is currently married to Jungian analyst and writer Molly Jordan, granddaughter of actors and radio personalities Jim and Marian Jordan. He was previously married to Rita Litter, mother of his children Billy Koch and Emily Anne Koch; to Marcia Zukor (now married to Ken Ziffren), mother of Robby Koch. He also previously dated actress Joanna Pacuła in 1983 after casting her in Gorky Park. His grandsons are actor Cooper Koch and film editor Payton Koch.

== Filmography ==
He was a producer in all films unless otherwise noted.

=== Film ===
Year	Film	Credit
1975	The Drowning Pool	Associate producer
1977	The Other Side of Midnight	Executive producer
1978	Heaven Can Wait	Executive producer
1979	The Frisco Kid	Executive producer
1980	The Idolmaker	
1981	Honky Tonk Freeway	
1983	A Night in Heaven	
1983	The Keep	
1983	Gorky Park	
1984	The Pope of Greenwich Village	
1989	Rooftops	
1990	The Long Walk Home	
1991	Necessary Roughness	Executive producer
1992	Wayne's World	Executive producer
1993	The Temp	Executive producer
1993	Sliver	Executive producer
1993	Wayne's World 2	Executive producer
1995	Losing Isaiah	
1995	Virtuosity	Executive producer
1996	Primal Fear	Executive producer
1997	The Beautician and the Beast	
2000	Keeping the Faith	
2000	Frequency	
2002	Collateral Damage	Executive producer
2005	Hostage	Executive producer
2007	Blood & Chocolate	
2007	Fracture	Executive producer
2008	Untraceable	
2010	Norman	
2011	Source Code	Executive producer
2013	Very Good Girls	Executive producer

Second unit director or assistant director

Year	Film	Role	Notes
1969	Pendulum	Second assistant director	Uncredited
1969	Bob & Carol & Ted & Alice	Second assistant director	Uncredited
1970	Getting Straight	Assistant director	
1970	WUSA	Assistant director	Uncredited
1970	The Baby Maker	Assistant director	
1971	The Hired Hand	Assistant director	
1971	Fools' Parade	Assistant director	
1971	Something Big	Assistant director	
1971	Going Home	Assistant director	
1972	Bad Company	Assistant director	
1972	Up the Sandbox	First assistant director	
1973	The Way We Were	Assistant director	
1974	The Parallax View	First assistant director	
1974	Chinatown	Assistant director	
1975	Once Is Not Enough	Assistant director	
1975	The Drowning Pool	Assistant director	
1976	Marathon Man	Assistant director	
1978	Heaven Can Wait	Assistant director	

Miscellaneous crew

Year	Film	Role	Notes	Ref.
1966	Jesse James Meets Frankenstein's Daughter	Assistant to producer	Uncredited	
1966	Billy the Kid Versus Dracula	Assistant to the producer		
1968	Project X	Dialogue coach	Uncredited	
1968	The Odd Couple	Dialogue coach		
1968	Rosemary's Baby	Dialogue coach		

Production manager

Year	Film	Role
1975	Once Is Not Enough	Production manager
2005	Hostage	Unit production manager
2007	Fracture	Unit production manager
2008	Untraceable	Unit production manager

As an actor

Year	Film	Role	Notes	Other notes
1969	Bob & Carol & Ted & Alice	El Taco Employee	Voice role	Uncredited
2000	Keeping the Faith	Rabbinical Professor		

Thanks

Year	Film	Role
2019	Above Suspicion	Special thanks

=== Television ===
Year	Title	Credit	Notes
2004	The Riverman	Executive producer	Television film
2013	Christmas in Conway	Executive producer	Television film

Miscellaneous crew

Year	Title	Role	Notes
1973	Magnavox Presents Frank Sinatra	Stage manager	Television special
2013	85th Academy Awards	President: Academy of Motion Picture Arts and Sciences	Television special

Production manager

Year	Title	Role
1969	Then Came Bronson	Production manager

Non-profit organization positions
Preceded by Tom Sherak	President of the Academy of Motion Picture Arts and Sciences; 2012-2013	Succeeded by Cheryl Boone Isaacs
Preceded by Marshall Herskovitz	Co-President of the Producers Guild of America; 2010-2014 (co-president with Mark Gordon)	Succeeded by Gary Lucchesi and Lori McCreary
