= Carter Smith (filmmaker) =

American film director

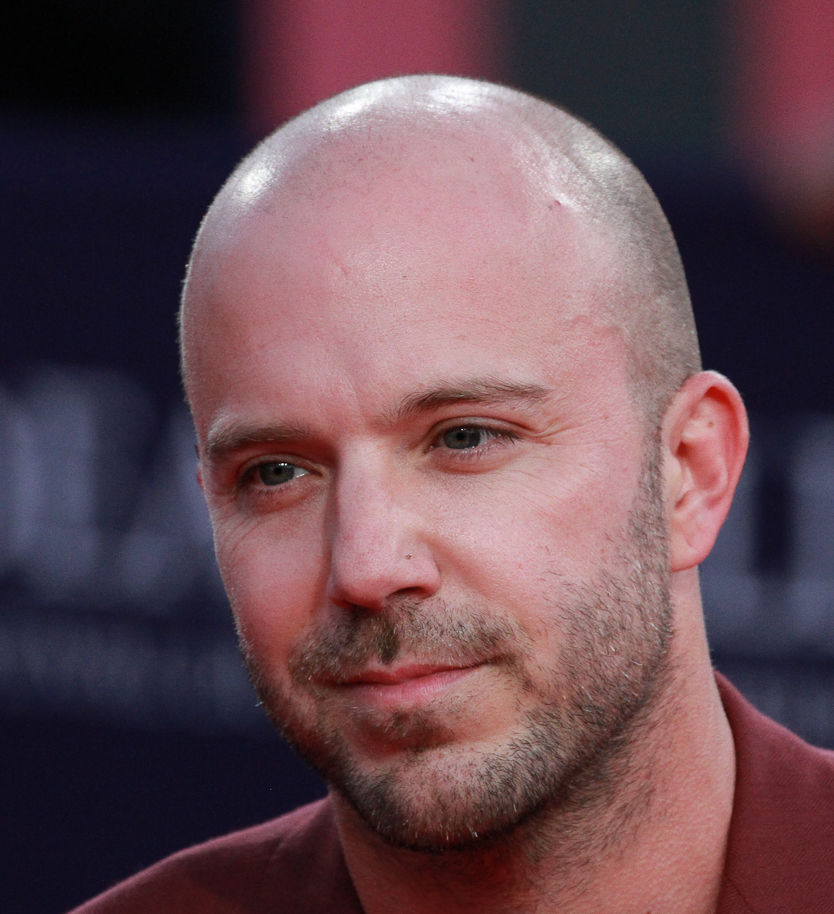
- Smith in 2014
- Born: September 6, 1971 (age 55); Bowdoinham, Maine, U.S.
- Occupations: Film director Fashion photographer

Carter Smith (born September 6, 1971) is an American filmmaker and fashion photographer. He is best known for directing the films The Ruins (2008), Jamie Marks Is Dead (2014), Swallowed (2022), and The Passenger (2023).

== Early life and education ==
Smith was born in Bowdoinham, Maine. After graduating from Mt. Ararat High School in 1989, he moved to New York City. He enrolled at the Fashion Institute of Technology but later dropped out to pursue a career in fashion photography.

== Career ==
=== Photography ===
Smith has shot photo spreads for Vogue, GQ, and W Magazine, as well as numerous celebrity photo shoots.

=== Film ===
Smith began directing commercials for clients such as Lancôme, Tommy Hilfiger and Tiffany's. In 2006, he directed the short horror film Bugcrush, based on a short story by Scott Treleaven. The film won the Short Filmmaking Award at the Sundance Film Festival.

Smith's feature film debut was a big-screen adaptation of Scott Smith's 2006 horror novel The Ruins. His short film Yearbook debuted at the 2011 Sundance Film Festival.

== Personal life ==
Smith is openly gay.

== Filmography ==
Short film

Year	Title	Director	Writer	Producer
1998	Me and Max	Yes	No	No
2006	Bugcrush	Yes	Yes	No
2011	Yearbook	Yes	No	Yes

Feature film

Year	Title	Director	Writer	Producer
2008	The Ruins	Yes	No	No
2014	Jamie Marks Is Dead	Yes	Yes	No
2022	Swallowed	Yes	Yes	Yes
2023	The Passenger	Yes	No	No

Television

Year	Title	Notes
2019	Into the Dark	Episode: "Midnight Kiss"
