= San Diego Film Critics Society Awards 1998 =

Annual US film awards ceremony

3rd SDFCS Awards

December 18, 1998

Best Film:
Gods and Monsters

The 3rd San Diego Film Critics Society Awards, given by the San Diego Film Critics Society on 18 December 1998, honored the best in film for 1998.

== Winners ==
- Best Actor:
  - Ian McKellen – Gods and Monsters
- Best Actress:
  - Susan Sarandon – Stepmom
- Best Director:
  - John Madden – Shakespeare in Love
- Best Film:
  - Gods and Monsters
- Best Foreign Language Film:
  - Life is Beautiful (La vita è bella) • Italy
- Best Screenplay – Adapted:
  - A Simple Plan – Scott B. Smith
- Best Screenplay – Original:
  - Sliding Doors – Peter Howitt
- Best Supporting Actor:
  - Billy Bob Thornton – A Simple Plan
- Best Supporting Actress:
  - Kathy Bates – Primary Colors
- Special Award:
  - Gwyneth Paltrow – Sliding Doors and Shakespeare in Love

== Sources ==
- San Diego Film Critics Society Awards 1998 on IMDb
