= Payton Koch =

American film editor (born 1996)

- Born: July 16, 1996 (age 30); Los Angeles, California, U.S.
- Education: Chapman University
- Occupation: Film editor
- Mother: Kathy Kaehler
- Relatives: Cooper Koch (twin brother); Hawk Koch (grandfather); Howard W. Koch (great-grandfather)

Payton Koch (/ˈkɑːtʃ/; born July 16, 1996) is an American film editor. He is best known for his work on the mystery-comedy drama series Only Murders in the Building (2022–2024) and the fantasy action-adventure series Avatar: The Last Airbender (2026), the former of which earned him nominations for a Primetime Emmy Award and three ACE Eddie Awards. He previously served as an assistant editor under Ryan Murphy Productions, with credits for American Horror Story (2018–2021), The Politician (2020), Ratched (2020), and Impeachment: American Crime Story (2021).

== Biography ==
Payton Koch was born on July 16, 1996, in Woodland Hills, Los Angeles, to a family involved in the film business. His father, Billy Koch, who is of Jewish Russian descent, is the founder and owner of the horse racing club Little Red Feather and previously worked in the film industry. His mother, Kathy Kaehler, is a celebrity personal trainer. He has a twin brother, Cooper Koch, who is an actor, and a younger brother, Walker, who is a musician. His grandfather is film producer Hawk Koch, and his great-grandfather was film producer and director Howard W. Koch, both of whom served as presidents of the Academy of Motion Picture Arts and Sciences. His great-granduncle was Charles Pincus, (Note: Pincus was the brother of Koch's great-grandmother, Ruth Koch (née Pincus).) a California dentist known for inventing the dental veneer in 1928. Koch is also related to businessman and Democratic politician Alan Blinken (Note: Blinken was married to Koch's great-aunt, Melinda Blinken (née Koch), until her death in 2021.) as his great-uncle by marriage.

Koch attended Calabasas High School and later earned a bachelor's degree in film production from Chapman University's Dodge College of Film and Media Arts. Koch is gay.

== Selected filmography ==
=== Editing credits ===
==== Film ====
Year	Title	Contribution	Notes	Ref.
2018	Salton Sea	Co-editor	Feature film	
2020	The Boys in the Band	Second assistant editor	Feature film	
2024	So Much for Solidarity	Editor	Short film	
2025	The Runner	Editor	Short film	

==== Television series ====
Year	Title	Contribution	Notes	Ref.
2018	American Horror Story: Apocalypse	Post-production assistant	10 episodes	
2020	The Politician	Assistant editor	2 episodes	
2020	Ratched	Assistant editor	8 episodes	
2020	Pose-a-Thon for Pride	Editor	TV special	
2020	Impeachment: American Crime Story	Assistant editor	3 episodes	
2021	Home Before Dark	Assistant editor	4 episodes	
2021	Just Beyond	Assistant editor	4 episodes	
2021	American Horror Story: Double Feature	Assistant editor	Episode: "The Future Perfect"	
2022–2024	Only Murders in the Building	Assistant editor	2 episodes	
2022–2024	Only Murders in the Building	Editor	11 episodes	
2023	Shrinking	Assistant editor	Episode: "Closure"	
2026	Avatar: The Last Airbender	Editor	2 episodes	

=== Acting credits ===
Year	Title	Role	Notes	Ref.
2007	Fracture	Kid		
2016	Till Death Do Us Part	Lover	Short film	

== Awards and nominations ==
Year	Award	Category	Work	Result	Ref.
2023	BFE Cut Above Awards	Best Edited Series: Comedy	Only Murders in the Building: Season 2	Nominated	
2023	ACE Eddie Awards	Best Edited Single-Camera Comedy Series	Only Murders in the Building: "I Know Who Did It"	Nominated	
2024	ACE Eddie Awards	Best Edited Single-Camera Comedy Series	Only Murders in the Building: "Sitzprobe"	Nominated	
2024	Primetime Emmy Awards	Outstanding Picture Editing for a Single-Camera Comedy Series	Only Murders in the Building: "Sitzprobe"	Nominated	
2025	ACE Eddie Awards	Best Edited Single-Camera Comedy Series	Only Murders in the Building: "My Best Friend's Wedding"	Nominated	
