= Swallowed (film) =

2022 film by Carter Smith

- Release poster
- Directed by: Carter Smith
- Written by: Carter Smith
- Produced by: Noah Lang; Helio Campos; Ross O'Connor
- Starring: Cooper Koch; Jose Colon; Jena Malone; Mark Patton
- Cinematography: Alex Wolf Lewis
- Edited by: Eric Nagy
- Music by: Christopher Bear
- Production companies: All the Dead Boys; Leroi; Witchcraft Motion Picture Company
- Distributed by: Momentum Pictures
- Release dates: June 4, 2022 (Overlook Film Festival); February 14, 2023 (United States)
- Running time: 93 minutes
- Country: United States
- Language: English

Swallowed is a 2022 American independent body horror film written and directed by Carter Smith. The film stars Cooper Koch, Jose Colon, Jena Malone, and Mark Patton. It follows Benjamin (Koch), an aspiring pornographic actor, and his friend Dom (Colon) as they attempt to smuggle mysterious substances by swallowing them.

The film premiered at the 2022 Overlook Film Festival, and was released in the United States on February 14, 2023. It received generally positive reviews from critics, and received the Grand Jury Prize at the 2022 NewFest.

== Plot ==
Two friends, Benjamin and Dom, are celebrating their last night together before Ben flies to Los Angeles to become a gay porn star. Dom drives them to do a drug run to Canada to make some money to help set Ben up in L.A.

Their contact, Alice, forces them to swallow five condoms holding the drugs: Dom swallows four and Ben swallows the fifth. Across the border, the pair go to a rest stop where Dom stands up to a homophobic truck driver and is punched in the stomach. He begins to experience stomach pains and passes one of his four packages. Alice meets the two men and drives them to her boss, Rich, and explains that the drug bundles are larvae with venomous bites that get people high.

Ben extracts all but one of Dom's packages, which has burst inside him. Dom overdoses from the larvae bites and dies. Rich shoots Alice and then tries to seduce Ben, who stabs him with tweezers and flees where he passes his larvae cache. Ben goes back to the cabin, where he sees and watches Rich dump Alice's body in the outhouse well. Ben has his passed larvae, which bites Rich, and Ben throws him down the outhouse well.

Over the credits, Ben is seen being interviewed on the red carpet at a pornography award show, where he is nominated for "Best Newcummer". He emotionally thanks "all the people who believed in me".

== Cast ==
- Cooper Koch as Benjamin
- Jose Colon as Dom
- Jena Malone as Alice
- Mark Patton as Rich
- Roe Pacheco as Border Officer
- Michael Curtis as Randy Redneck
- Jonathan Spence as Thee Suburbia (themself)
- Hannah Perry as Dee

== Production ==
...For me to put it front and centre and to make a film that is 100% unabashedly from a queer point of view with queer characters, in a story that isn't necessarily about them being queer, is really meaningful.

— Carter Smith on the emphasis of the film's gay perspective.

Writer-director Carter Smith had wanted to make a low-budget film akin to a directorial debut, in contrast to his own feature debut The Ruins (2008). Upon writing, Smith had written the role of Rich for Mark Patton, while The Ruins collaborator and friend Jena Malone was the first choice he had in mind for Alice. Additionally, Jose Colon was cast after previously starring in a photoshoot series for Smith's gay-centric All the Dead Boys banner, while Cooper Koch was cast by Smith immediately upon viewing his audition tape.

It was filmed in Maine, where Smith had lived previously; the cabin used was built by his father.

== Release ==
Swallowed premiered at the Overlook Film Festival on June 4, 2022. It also screened at Fantastic Fest in Austin, Texas, and FrightFest on September 23–28 and October 28 that same year, respectively. In January 2023, Momentum Pictures purchased the North American distribution rights, and released the film on video-on-demand and other digital retailers on February 14, 2023.

== Critical response ==
On the review aggregator website Rotten Tomatoes, 82% of 51 critics' reviews are positive, with an average rating of 6.3/10. The website's consensus reads: "Although its second half is difficult to digest, Swallowed is an admirably unusual – and overall effective – mixture of body horror and romance." Metacritic, which uses a weighted average, assigned the film a score of 53 out of 100, based on 4 critics, indicating "mixed or average" reviews.

== Awards and nominations ==
Year	Award	Category	Nominee(s)	Result	Ref.
2021	American Film Festival	US in Progress – Finishing Services Prize	Swallowed	Won	
2022	NewFest	Grand Jury Prize	Swallowed	Won	
2022	Popcorn Frights Film Festival	Scariest Feature Film Prize	Swallowed	Won	
2022	FilmOut San Diego	Best Actress in a Supporting Role	Jena Malone	Won	
2023	Golden Trailer Awards	Best Horror Poster	Swallowed	Won	
