= The Ruins (novel) =

2006 horror novel by Scott Smith

- First edition cover
- Author: Scott Smith
- Cover artist: Peter Mendelsund
- Language: English
- Genre: Horror, thriller
- Publisher: Vintage
- Publication date: July 18, 2006
- Publication place: United States
- Media type: Print (hardcover)
- Pages: 384
- ISBN: 1-4000-4387-5
- OCLC: 62878416
- Dewey Decimal: 813/.54 22
- LC Class: PS3569.M5379759 R85 2006

The Ruins is a 2006 horror novel by American author Scott Smith, set on Mexico's Yucatán Peninsula. The book fits specifically into the survival horror genre, which is marked by people doing whatever it takes to conquer their environment and stay alive. The novel was released on July 18, 2006 (ISBN 1-4000-4387-5).

A film adaptation of the novel was released in the United States and Canada on April 4, 2008.

== Plot summary ==
Two American couples, Jeff and Amy, Eric and Stacy, were having a vacation in Mexico. There they met a German named Matthias, who were looking for his brother, Heinrich, who departed to find an archeological dig in the Maya jungle. Also joining them were three Greeks, whose real names weren't known due to difference in languages, the group called them Pablo, Juan and Don Quixote.

One morning, Matthias showed Jeff and Amy the hand-drawn map left behind by Heinrich in the morning of his departure, the map also contains instructions on how to get to said archeological dig. Jeff humored the idea of their group embarking on an adventure to find Matthias's brother, Amy silently resented this, but didn't speak up. Later that morning, the group set out on their journey to the dig, Pablo also joined them, he left a copy of Heinrich's map for Juan and Don Quixote to follow if they so were interested. Once arrived at the jungle, they hitchhiked a truck to ferry them off the beaten tracks. The truck driver, upon learning their destination, tried to warn Amy not to go there, Amy told the group about this though they rebuffed her.

They journeyed through the jungle and arrived at a Mayan village, where they had to backtrack to find the turnoff that would lead them to their destination according to the map. Amy suggested searching the other side of a clearing they passed earlier, where they found the entrance to their turnoff, concealed by a bush that has been made to look as if it naturally sprouted there. Amy took concern about this, but Jeff again ignored her. After traversing the narrow path, they arrived at another clearing, with a hill covered in beautiful red flowers on the other side. As the group attempted to ascend the hill, the Mayan villagers arrived with their weapons, threaten them not to go further. Due to their difference in languages, however, they were unable to understand each other. When Amy tried to take a photo of the groups arguing, she accidentally stepped on the vines near the hill, which prompted the villagers to push the group upon it.

At the hilltop, they found several empty tents with tools most likely belonged to the archeologists, a shaft in the center, and flowery vines covered the scenery. When they descended the hill, they were surrounded by Mayan villagers and their weapons. Jeff noticed a strange vine-covered mound, where they found the remains of Heinrich, with arrow wounds through his chest. Unable to leave the hill, the group returned to the top, where they heard a phone ringing down the shaft. Pablo volunteered to descend, but the ropes snapped due to the burning sap from the vines when they were crushed under the movement, causing Pablo to fall and break his back, Eric was also wounded when trying to reach Pablo. When they were brought back, they rested Pablo on a makeshift bed while the others take turn to watch over him. In the morning, Pablo and Eric woke up horrified to find the vines had made their ways into their wounds, enticed by the smell of blood. The vines had eaten a large part of Pablo's legs, forcing an amputation, whereas Eric had to undergo several incisions to take out the vines inside him, although he continuously claimed there's still more vines in his body.

The group decided the other two Greeks, Juan and Don Quixote, to be their best bet for escape, hoping they get on the message Pablo left them. They took turns to watch the base of the hill for signs of the Greeks, Jeff found various vine-covered mounds similar to Heinrich's, containing the remains of the hill's previous victims. Later, Jeff and Amy decided to descend the shaft once more, hoping to find the ringing cellphone, they were chased off by the vines as it enticed them into a trap. Jeff later theorized the vines might be sentient, although others disbelieved him. The next day, Amy, Stacy and Eric, desperate with their situation, got drunk while entertaining each other, neglecting their chores, which infuriated Jeff. Following a heated argument, Amy left to the other side of the clearing to sleep, not wanting to be close to Jeff, she crawled back in the morning vomiting, but Jeff assumed she was having a hangover, thus not helping her. Later Matthias discovered Amy dead, choked on the vines that wormed their way into her mouth, hence the vomiting. As they buried her in a sleeping bag, the vines quickly claimed her body while mimicking her voice calling out to Jeff. A guilt-ridden Jeff wandered the hill looking out for the Greeks, when he noticed the area was covered in mist following an earlier downpour, he attempted to run pass the Mayan, but was struck by arrows and claimed by the vines.

At the hilltop, the vines were calling out to the others in various language, they announced Jeff dead, mimicked strangers talking in German, and to Eric's surprise, Stacy and Matthias being intimate. As the trio argued, the vines suffocated Pablo, claiming his body. The next morning, Matthias descended the hill to look for the Greeks, Stacy followed him. Left alone, Eric began hacking at his body where he felt the vines crawling. When Matthias tried to stop him, Eric stabbed him in the heart, killing him. A prostrated Eric begged Stacy to finish him, which she complied. Shortly after, Stacy committed suicide by slashing her wrists.

The Greeks arrived three days later, accompanied by three new Brazilian friends. The turnoff leading to their destination was greatly noticeable this time due to the recent movements. They saw a Mayan girl warned them not to get any closer, although they didn't understand.her. The group arrived at the hill and made their ascent even before the Mayan villagers arrived.

== Publication history ==
According to an interview with the Pittsburgh Tribune-Review, the book started as a trial run after a period when the novelist had concentrated on writing the screenplay for A Simple Plan. "It went in stops and starts," Smith told journalist Regis Behe. "I would give up on it, thinking it wouldn't work...With The Ruins I really just started writing. I had a general sense of the story. I knew how I wanted it to end, but all the steps to get there... I just wrote it. I didn't plan it, and, obviously, that had major repercussions that carried through the story." Smith added that he never traveled to Mexico, where the book is set; he merely read a few travel books and did some Internet research.

== Critical reception ==
Entertainment Weekly reviewer Gillian Flynn gave The Ruins an A−, calling it "Thomas Harris meets Poe in a decidedly timely story," continuing, "Smith has tapped into our anxieties about global warming, lethal weather, supergerms—our collective fear that nature is finally fighting back—and given us a decidedly organic nightmare."

Michiko Kakutani, writing for The New York Times, said, "As in his debut novel, A Simple Plan (Knopf, 1993), Mr. Smith is concerned with what happens to a group of ordinary people when they are suddenly placed in a decidedly extraordinary situation. In that earlier book, evil turns out to be something that lurks deep within his heroes' greedy hearts. In The Ruins, evil is something randomly stumbled upon in the jungle." Kakutani was unimpressed, comparing the novel unfavorably with Little Shop of Horrors and saying, "The Ruins, however, isn't a comedy or a musical. It seems meant to be a straight-ahead thriller, with some bloody set pieces lifted from the horror genre thrown in for extra chills: you know, grisly, up-close shots of people having their legs chewed up or being choked to death by demonic forces. Whatever humor is produced by the story's Cruel Talking Plants appears to be entirely inadvertent."

In Salon, Laura Miller warned, "Don't start this book if you're especially weak of stomach or nerves, and above all don't pick it up if you're not willing to tolerate some deviation from the usual conventions of thrillers and horror stories. Not everything will be explained to you, and not everything will turn out in the tidy, reassuring ways to which we've all become accustomed. The Ruins is like all great genre fiction in its irresistible storytelling momentum, but in its lack of mercy, it's more like real life."

Reviewer Tony Buchsbaum found himself "blown away by the author's crisp, clearly-focused way with a scene. He paints each one like a great artist, yet also holds back, sharing only the bits and pieces of detail that you need to make the scene your own." He adds,

The rest, as it turns out, is pretty fantastic. If you don't want to take my word for it, ask author Stephen King, who has called The Ruins the book of the summer... Stephen King nailed it. The Ruins really is the book of the summer. But not because it'll scare the bejesus out of you—it will—and not because it's crafted so perfectly—it is—and not even because it'll draw you in, page by page, closing tighter and tighter around you, until your mouth and eyes are all O-shaped and your mind is just about unable to conceive of the fact that you've made it out alive. The Ruins is the book of the summer because, put simply, it's so good that it'll ruin every other book's chances.

Stephen King made the comment in a column for Entertainment Weekly, writing, "The Book of the Summer: That would be The Ruins, by Scott Smith, last heard from in 1993 (A Simple Plan, later filmed by Sam Raimi from Smith's script). No quietly building, Ruth Rendell-style suspense here; Smith intends to scare the bejabbers out of you, and succeeds. There are no chapters and no cutaways—The Ruins is your basic long scream of horror. It does for Mexican vacations what Jaws did for New England beaches in 1975."

The Pittsburgh Tribune-Review said that the novel "is, superficially, the perfect summertime beach read. Between the lines of The Ruins, however, is a dark, sometimes scathing, social commentary." The reviewer added that it "has a strange duality in that it directly pays homage to Rod Serling's Twilight Zone, and indirectly to The Corrections by Jonathan Franzen. The story of four young Americans caught in a deadly situation on a trip to Mayan ruins in Mexico, it builds a tension that Serling excelled at, created from knowing that a situation is spinning out of control in ways beyond the characters' comprehension."
