= Calabasas High School =

High school in Calabasas, California, US

Location
- 22855 Mulholland Highway; Calabasas, CA 91302; United States; 34°8′17″N 118°37′39″W

Information
- School type: Public, High school
- Established: 1975; 51 years ago
- School district: Las Virgenes Unified
- Principal: Bennett Wutkee
- Teaching staff: 63.29 (FTE)
- Grades: 9–12
- Enrollment: 1,721 (2023–2024)
- Student to teacher ratio: 27.19
- Colors: Black; Gold
- Athletics conference: CIF Southern Section; Marmonte League
- Nickname: Coyotes
- Accreditation: Western Association of Schools and Colleges
- Newspaper: Calabasas Courier
- Yearbook: Oracle
- Website: Official website

Calabasas High School is a four-year public high school in Calabasas, California, United States.

Calabasas High School, which serves Calabasas, Bell Canyon, and portions of West Hills, Los Angeles, is one of three high schools in the Las Virgenes Unified School District (along with Agoura High School and Indian Hills High School in Agoura Hills).

As of the 2014–15 school year, the school had an enrollment of 1,824 students and 65.4 classroom teachers (on an FTE basis), for a student–teacher ratio of 27.9:1. There were 103 students (5.6% of enrollment) eligible for free lunch and 26 (1.4% of students) eligible for reduced-cost lunch.

== History ==
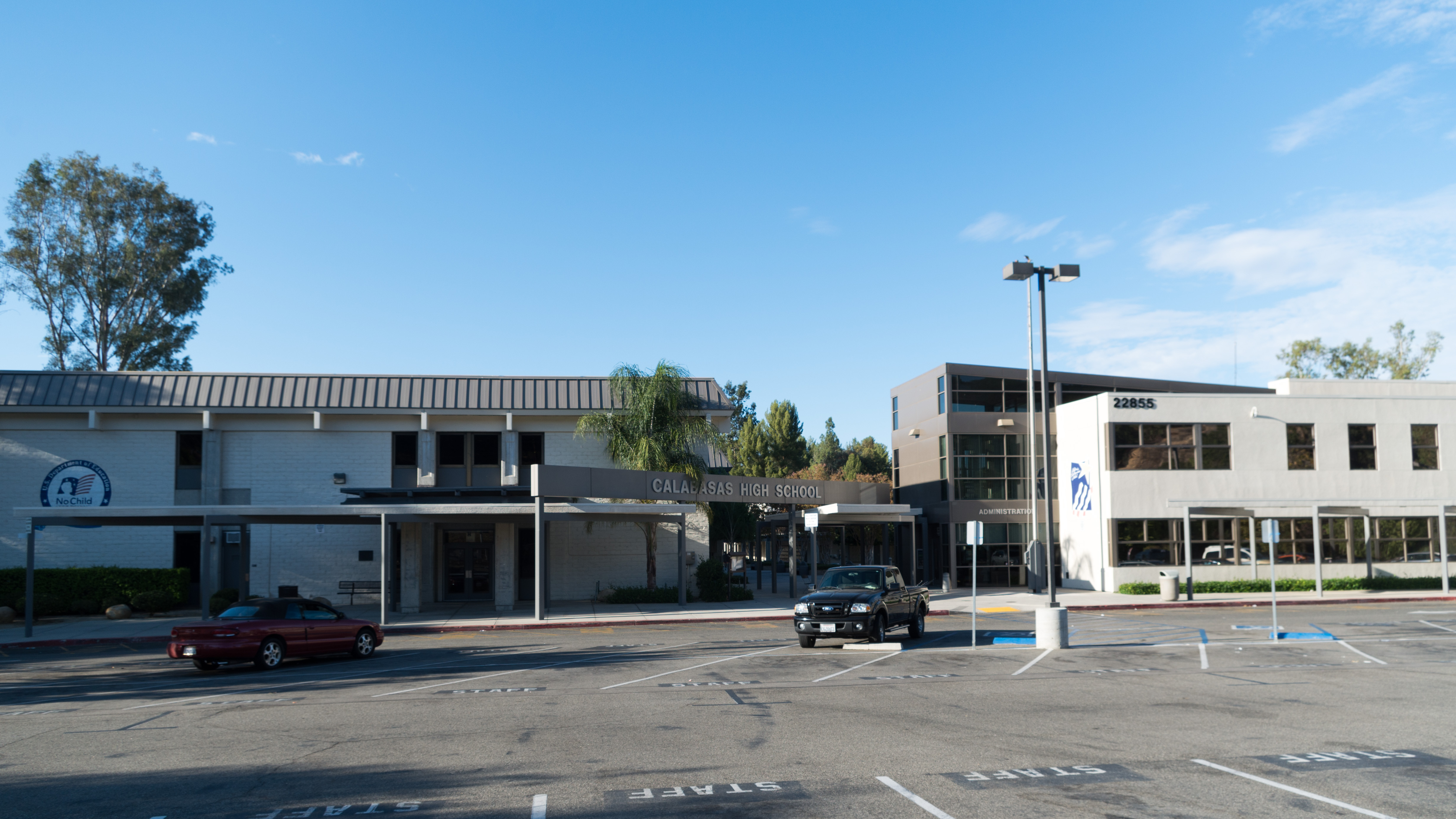
Calabasas High School

Calabasas High School was established in 1975 as the second high school in the Las Virgenes Unified School District.

During the 2006–07 school year Calabasas High School was recognized with the Blue Ribbon School Award of Excellence by the United States Department of Education, the highest award the Department of Education gives.

The school plays its football games at Keith Ritchie Field, an open-air stadium located in Calabasas, California, with a capacity of approximately 3,000. The stadium is the home of the Coyotes – Calabasas High School's football, track and field and soccer teams. It was also formerly the home field for the USL Premier Development League club, the San Fernando Valley Quakes.

The Calabasas High School Theater Program performs in the Performing Arts Education Center. The center opened in 2013. The $18 million building was funded through Measure G, which passed in 2006. The Performing Arts Education Center was designed by architect John Sergio Fisher. The mainstage theater seats 680 people. There is a black box theater in the facility that seats 100 people. The Performing Arts Education Center has won numerous design awards, including a 2012 AIA / SFV Award for Design Excellence and a 2011 Los Angeles Business Council Architectural Award.

== Notable alumni ==
- Shiri Appleby (born 1978), actress known for her roles in Swimfan, Roswell, and UnReal
- Elizabeth Berkley actress
- Ashlee Bond (born 1985), American-Israeli Olympic show jumping rider who competes for Israel
- Jermaine Burton (born 2001), former wide receiver for the Cincinnati Bengals
- Ezra Butler (born 1984), professional football player
- Katie Cassidy (born 1986), actress
- Mike Einziger (born 1976), musician, songwriter and producer; co-founder and guitarist of the rock band Incubus
- Omer Fedi (born 2000), Israeli guitarist, songwriter and producer
- Michelle Fields (born 1988), Fox News reporter
- Amanda Fink (born 1986, class of 2005), tennis player
- Danielle Fishel (born 1981, class of 1999), actress
- Gaby Hoffmann (born 1982), actress
- Darnay Holmes (born 1998), professional football player with the New York Giants
- Incubus: Brandon Boyd, Mike Einziger, Jose Pasillas and formerly Dirk Lance
- Jensen Karp (born 1979), author, rapper, television writer
- Beong-Soo Kim (born 1972), 13th president of the University of Southern California
- Cooper Koch (born 1996), actor
- Payton Koch (born 1996), film editor
- Ethan Josh Lee (born 2001), actor
- Julia Lester (born 2000), actress and singer
- Erik Menendez (born 1970), of the Menendez brothers, convicted of killing their parents
- Jim Rome (born 1964, class of 1982), sports television and radio host
- Ricky Schroder (born 1970), actor
- Doug Simons (born 1966), MLB player (New York Mets, Montreal Expos)
- Daniel Steres (born 1990), professional soccer player with the Houston Dynamo
- Johnny Wilson (born 2001), wide receiver for the Philadelphia Eagles
