= Primary Colors (film) =

- Promotional release poster
- Directed by: Mike Nichols
- Screenplay by: Elaine May
- Based on: Primary Colors by Joe Klein
- Produced by: Mike Nichols; Jonathan Krane; Neil Machlis
- Starring: John Travolta; Emma Thompson; Billy Bob Thornton; Adrian Lester; Maura Tierney; Paul Guilfoyle; Larry Hagman; Kathy Bates
- Cinematography: Michael Ballhaus
- Edited by: Arthur Schmidt
- Music by: Ry Cooder
- Production company: Mutual Film Company
- Distributed by: Universal Pictures
- Release date: March 20, 1998
- Running time: 143 minutes
- Country: United States
- Language: English
- Budget: $65 million
- Box office: $52.1 million

Primary Colors is a 1998 American political comedy-drama film directed by Mike Nichols. The screenplay by Elaine May was adapted from the novel Primary Colors: A Novel of Politics, a roman à clef about the Bill Clinton 1992 presidential campaign, which was originally published anonymously, but in 1996 was revealed to have been written by journalist Joe Klein, who had been covering Bill Clinton's campaign for Newsweek. The film stars John Travolta, Emma Thompson, Billy Bob Thornton, Kathy Bates, Maura Tierney, Larry Hagman and Adrian Lester.

Primary Colors was released by Universal Pictures on March 20, 1998. The film received critical acclaim but was a box office bomb, earning $52.1 million from a $65 million budget. Bates was nominated for an Academy Award for Best Supporting Actress for her performance, and May was nominated for an Academy Award for Best Adapted Screenplay.

== Plot ==
Henry Burton, a young political idealist and grandson of a civil rights leader, is recruited to join the campaign of Jack Stanton, a charismatic Southern governor trying to win the Democratic Party nomination for President of the United States.

Henry is impressed by Jack's genuine warmth and empathy. He joins the governor's inner circle of political advisers: Jack's formidable wife, Susan Stanton; unconventional political strategist, Richard Jemmons; intelligent and attractive spokeswoman, Daisy Green; and sly political operator, Howard Ferguson, as they journey to New Hampshire, the first state to hold a presidential primary.

After Jack completes an impressive debate performance against his rivals, Henry's ex-girlfriend March Cunningham shows up to question the governor about his arrest for an anti-war protest at the 1968 Democratic Convention in Chicago. Jack had called a U.S. senator to help him get released, then persuaded the mayor of Chicago to have his police record expunged. The team becomes worried that Jack's past indiscretions may be used against him by the press and his opponents.

The Stantons hire an old friend, the tough but unbalanced Libby Holden, to investigate allegations - including Jack's notorious womanizing - that could be used by opponents to undermine him. One of these women, Susan's hairdresser, Cashmere McLeod, produces secret taped conversations with the governor, showing they had an affair. Henry discovers the tapes have been doctored, so Libby tracks down the man responsible and forces him at gunpoint to confess his guilt in a letter to the American public.

The campaign is then rocked by a fresh allegation when Jack's old friend, "Fat Willie" McCollister, approaches Henry to tell him that his 17-year-old daughter Loretta, who worked for the Stantons as a babysitter, is pregnant and that Jack is the father. Henry and Howard tell Willie he must allow his daughter to undergo an amniocentesis to determine paternity. Although they persuade Willie to remain silent, Henry is sickened.

Realizing Jack is falling behind in the polls, his team adopt an offensive strategy, attacking his nearest rival, Senator Lawrence Harris, for casting anti-Israel votes and favoring cuts in Social Security and Medicare. Harris confronts Jack during a radio talk show in Florida but suffers two heart attacks during the encounter. This medical setback causes his withdrawal from the race. He is replaced by his friend, former Florida governor Fred Picker, whose wholesome, straight-talking image is an immediate threat to Stanton's campaign.

Jack and Susan send Henry and Libby on an opposition research mission into Picker's past. They discover he had a cocaine addiction as governor, which led to the disintegration of his first marriage. They also meet with Picker's cocaine supplier, with whom Picker had a homosexual affair.

Not expecting the information to ever be used, Libby and Henry share their findings with Jack and Susan, but are dismayed when the couple decides to leak their findings to the press. Libby tells Jack that if he does so, she will reveal that he tampered with the paternity test results, which proved that he had sex with Willie's daughter. Libby commits suicide after realizing she spent her life idealizing Jack and Susan only to learn how flawed they truly are.

Racked with guilt over Libby's death, Jack and Henry take the incriminating information to Picker, and apologize for seeking it out. Picker admits to his past indiscretions, deciding to withdraw from the race and endorse Jack. Henry intends to quit the campaign, as he has become deeply disillusioned with the political process. Jack begs Henry to reconsider, saying they can make history.

Months later, President Jack Stanton is dancing at the inaugural ball with Susan. He shakes the hands of his campaign staff, the last of whom is Henry.

== Cast ==
- John Travolta as Arkansas Governor Jack Stanton
- Emma Thompson as First Lady of Arkansas Susan Stanton
- Adrian Lester as Henry Burton
- Billy Bob Thornton as Richard Jemmons
- Kathy Bates as Libby Holden
- Maura Tierney as Daisy Green
- Paul Guilfoyle as Howard Ferguson
- Larry Hagman as Florida Governor Fred Picker
- Stacy Edwards as Jennifer Rogers
- Diane Ladd as Mamma Stanton
- Kevin Cooney as Senator Lawrence Harris
- Rebecca Walker as March Cunningham
- Caroline Aaron as Lucille Kaufman
- Tommy Hollis as William "Fat Willie" McCollister
- Rob Reiner as Izzy Rosenblatt
- Ben L. Jones as Arlen Sporken
- J. C. Quinn as Uncle Charlie
- Allison Janney as Maryanne Walsh
- Robert Klein as Norman Asher
- Mykelti Williamson as Dewayne Smith
- Robert Easton as Dr. Beauregard
- Geraldo Rivera as Himself
- Charlie Rose as Himself
- Larry King as Himself
- Chelcie Ross as Senator Charles Martin
- Tony Shalhoub as Eddie Reyes
- John Vargas as Lorenzo Delgado
- Robert Cicchini as Governor Jimmy Ozio
- Gia Carides as Cashmere McLeod
- Bill Maher as Himself
- Sophia Choi as Herself

== Production ==
Following the publication of the book Primary Colors by Joe Klein (initially published anonymously) in 1996, director Mike Nichols paid more than $1 million for the screen rights. The film was scripted by writer and director Elaine May, who had collaborated with Nichols in the comedy double-act Nichols and May in the 1950s and 60s. Tom Hanks expressed interest in the project but was busy working on Saving Private Ryan and executive-producing From the Earth to the Moon for HBO, so recommended Nichols cast someone else. At the Cannes Festival, Emma Thompson said she did not base her performance as Susan Stanton on Hillary Clinton, while John Travolta said he based his performance as Jack Stanton on several presidents, but mostly on Bill Clinton.

Nichols was criticized for cutting an interracial love scene between Henry Burton (Adrian Lester) and Susan from the final version of the film. He responded that he had removed the scene because of unfavorable reactions from a preview audience. The film also generated controversy for its depiction of a Clinton-like character as it was also released close to the Clinton–Lewinsky scandal.

== Reception ==
=== Box office ===
The film earned a disappointing box office gross, only taking $39 million domestically and $13 million in foreign markets, for a worldwide total gross of $52 million against a budget of $65 million.

=== Critical response ===
The film received a positive reception from critics. Variety's reviewer called it a "film à clef" and said that the American public was likely to accept it as a factual account because it so closely mirrored real life characters and events. The Los Angeles Times gave high marks to the movie, noting Travolta's close mirroring of Bill Clinton, but describing Thompson's character as actually not based on Hillary Clinton. Entertainment Weekly called Travolta "Clintonian". The Cincinnati Enquirer gave accolades to the character portrayals of Bill and Hillary Clinton. Syndicated reviewer Roger Ebert said that the film was "insightful and very wise about the realities of political life" and The Cincinnati Enquirer said the film was a "nuanced dissection of how real American politics work". and Gene Shalit on the Today Show called the film an absolute spectacle. Phillip Schofield also liked it.

In a negative review, Jeff Vice of the Deseret News wrote that the last half of the film dragged, Travolta's performance seemed more like an impersonation than actual acting, the film lacked subtlety or depth, and it was loaded with cheap and obvious jokes. Nevertheless, Vice wrote that "solid support is provided by Maura Tierney, Larry Hagman, and Stacy Edwards".

On Rotten Tomatoes, the film has an approval rating of 80% based on 80 reviews, with an average rating of 7.70/10. The site's critics' consensus reads: "Well acted and surprisingly funny." On Metacritic it has a score of 70% based on reviews from 30 critics, indicating "generally favorable reviews". Audiences surveyed by CinemaScore gave the film a grade "B" on scale of A to F.

=== Accolades ===
| Award | Category | Recipient(s) | Result |
|---|---|---|---|
| Academy Awards | Best Supporting Actress | Kathy Bates | Nominated |
| Academy Awards | Best Adapted Screenplay | Elaine May | Nominated |
| American Comedy Awards | Funniest Actress in a Motion Picture (Leading Role) | Emma Thompson | Nominated |
| American Comedy Awards | Funniest Supporting Actress in a Motion Picture | Kathy Bates | Won |
| Artios Awards | Best Casting for Feature Film – Drama | Juliet Taylor, Ellen Lewis and Juel Bestrop | Nominated |
| Awards Circuit Community Awards | Best Actress in a Supporting Role | Kathy Bates | Nominated |
| Awards Circuit Community Awards | Best Adapted Screenplay | Elaine May | Nominated |
| Awards Circuit Community Awards | Best Cast Ensemble | | Nominated |
| Blockbuster Entertainment Awards | Best Actress – Drama | Emma Thompson | Nominated |
| Blockbuster Entertainment Awards | Best Supporting Actress – Drama | Kathy Bates | Won |
| British Academy Film Awards | Best Actress in a Supporting Role | Kathy Bates | Nominated |
| British Academy Film Awards | Best Adapted Screenplay | Elaine May | Won |
| Chicago Film Critics Association Awards | Best Supporting Actress | Kathy Bates | Won |
| Chicago Film Critics Association Awards | Most Promising Actor | Adrian Lester | Nominated |
| Chlotrudis Awards | Best Supporting Actress | Kathy Bates | Nominated |
| Critics' Choice Movie Awards | Best Supporting Actor | Billy Bob Thornton (also for A Simple Plan) | Won |
| Critics' Choice Movie Awards | Best Supporting Actress | Kathy Bates | Won (Note: Tied with Joan Allen for Pleasantville.) |
| European Film Awards | World Cinema Award | Emma Thompson | Nominated |
| Golden Globe Awards | Best Actor in a Motion Picture – Musical or Comedy | John Travolta | Nominated |
| Golden Globe Awards | Best Supporting Actress – Motion Picture | Kathy Bates | Nominated |
| Las Vegas Film Critics Society Awards | Best Supporting Actress | Kathy Bates | Won |
| Los Angeles Film Critics Association Awards | Best Supporting Actress | Kathy Bates | Runner-up |
| Online Film & Television Association Awards | Best Comedy/Musical Picture | Mike Nichols | Nominated |
| Online Film & Television Association Awards | Best Comedy/Musical Actor | John Travolta | Nominated |
| Online Film & Television Association Awards | Best Comedy/Musical Actress | Kathy Bates | Nominated |
| Online Film & Television Association Awards | Best Supporting Actress | Kathy Bates | Won |
| Online Film & Television Association Awards | Best Screenplay – Based on Material from Another Medium | Elaine May | Nominated |
| Online Film & Television Association Awards | Best Casting | Juliet Taylor, Ellen Lewis and Juel Bestrop | Nominated |
| Online Film & Television Association Awards | Best Comedy/Musical Score | Ry Cooder and Carly Simon | Nominated |
| Online Film & Television Association Awards | Best Comedy/Musical Ensemble | | Nominated |
| Online Film Critics Society Awards | Best Supporting Actress | Kathy Bates | Nominated |
| Online Film Critics Society Awards | Best Adapted Screenplay | Elaine May | Nominated |
| Political Film Society Awards | Democracy | | Nominated |
| Russian Guild of Film Critics Awards | Best Foreign Actress | Emma Thompson | Nominated |
| San Diego Film Critics Society Awards | Best Supporting Actress | Kathy Bates | Won |
| Satellite Awards | Best Supporting Actress in a Motion Picture – Musical or Comedy | Kathy Bates | Nominated |
| Screen Actors Guild Awards | Outstanding Performance by a Female Actor in a Supporting Role | Kathy Bates | Won |
| Southeastern Film Critics Association Awards | Best Supporting Actress | Kathy Bates | Runner-up |
| Southeastern Film Critics Association Awards | Best Adapted Screenplay | Elaine May | Runner-up |
| USC Scripter Awards | | Elaine May (screenwriter); Joe Klein (author) | Nominated |
| Writers Guild of America Awards | Best Screenplay – Based on Material Previously Produced or Published | Elaine May | Nominated |

== Home video ==
Primary Colors was released on VHS and DVD in September 1998. It was released on Blu-ray by Universal in October 2019. Blu-ray.com gave the transfer a negative review, calling it "a digitally processed mess. Grain is frozen in place, edge enhancement is obvious, clarity struggles, and details are sloppy and indistinct." It was released on 4K Ultra HD Blu-ray by Shout! Factory on July 1, 2025, sourced from a new 4K restoration from the original camera negatives.

== Soundtrack ==
The soundtrack album, featuring music by and produced by Ry Cooder, was released in March 1998.
