= Kathy Kaehler =

American fitness professional

- Born: Catherine Kaehler
- Other name: Kathy Koch
- Education: Hope College (BS)
- Occupations: Fitness professional; personal trainer; author
- Spouse: Billy Koch (m. 1994)
- Children: 3, including Cooper and Payton
- Relatives: Hawk Koch (father-in-law); Howard W. Koch (grandfather-in-law)

Catherine Kaehler, known professionally as Kathy Kaehler, is an American fitness professional, personal trainer, and author. An inductee in the National Fitness Hall of Fame, she is known for training prolific Hollywood celebrities in the 1990s and early 2000s, including the Kardashian family, Ellen DeGeneres, Julia Roberts, Jennifer Aniston, Samuel L. Jackson, Cindy Crawford, and Michelle Pfeiffer. Kaehler previously served as a fitness correspondent for NBC's Today show for 13 years. She has also authored several fitness and lifestyle books, such as Primetime Bodies and Real World Fitness.

Kaehler is the mother of actor Cooper Koch, film editor Payton Koch, and musician Walker Koch.

== Personal life and education ==
Kaehler earned her bachelor's degree in physical education from Hope College in 1985. In 1994, she married horse racing club owner Billy Koch, the son of film producer Hawk Koch and grandson of film director and producer Howard W. Koch. They have three sons together: twins Cooper and Payton (born 1996), and Walker (born 1999). She is currently based in Woodland Hills, Los Angeles, and was previously based in Hidden Hills, California.

== Career ==
Kaehler began working as a personal trainer to actress Jane Fonda. In 1991, she became a fitness consultant for NBC's Today show, appearing with weekly exercise segments every Friday. She published her first book, Primetime Bodies, in 1996, which she wrote alongside fellow fitness professional Cynthia Tivers. Kaehler's notable clients include Julia Roberts, Jennifer Aniston, Carrie Fisher, Cindy Crawford, Michelle Pfeiffer, Kim Kardashian, Kris Jenner, Khloé Kardashian, Kim Basinger, Ellen DeGeneres, Drew Barrymore, Barbra Streisand, Claudia Schiffer, Meg Ryan, Rob Lowe, Andrew McCarthy, and Samuel L. Jackson.

In 2010, Kaehler was announced as an ambassador for USANA Health Sciences. In the same year, she launched Sunday Set-Up, a weekly lifestyle program. In 2014, she partnered with Nintendo to promote Wii Fit U.

== Books ==
- Primetime Bodies: The Six-week Hollywood Fitness Program (1996)
- Primetime Pregnancy: The Proven Program for Staying in Shape Before and After Your Baby is Born (1998)
- Real-World Fitness: Fun and Innovative Ways to Help You Sneak in Activity at Home, at Work and with the Kids (1998)
- Fit and Sexy for Life: The Hormone-free Plan for Staying Slim, Strong, and Fabulous in Your Forties, Fifties, and Beyond (2007)
- Kathy Kaehler's Celebrity Workouts: How to Get a Hollywood Body in Just 30 Minutes a Day (2005)
- Teenage Fitness: Get Fit, Look Good, and Feel Great! (2010)
- Mom Energy: A Simple Plan to Live Fully Charged (2011)

== Media appearances ==
Year	Title	Role	Notes	Ref.
1991-2003	Today	Herself	Fitness correspondent	
2002	As the World Turns	Kelly	2 episodes	
2008	Keeping Up with the Kardashians	Herself	Episode: "Rob's New Girlfriend"	
2010-2015	Sunday Set-Up	Herself	Host	
2014	Fox & Friends	Herself	Guest	
2020	Rusty Camel	Denise King	Web series	
2024	Down the Wicked Road	Winifred	Web series	
