= A Simple Plan (film) =

1998 film by Sam Raimi

- Theatrical release poster
- Directed by: Sam Raimi
- Screenplay by: Scott B. Smith
- Based on: A Simple Plan by Scott B. Smith
- Produced by: James Jacks; Adam Schroeder
- Starring: Bill Paxton; Billy Bob Thornton; Bridget Fonda
- Cinematography: Alar Kivilo
- Edited by: Arthur Coburn; Eric L. Beason
- Music by: Danny Elfman
- Production companies: Mutual Film Company; Savoy Pictures; BBC Films; Tele-München; UGC-PH; Toho-Towa; Marubeni; Newmarket Capital Group
- Distributed by: Paramount Pictures (Note: Distribution rights for A Simple Plan were split among multiple companies internationally. Paramount pictures handled distribution in the United States and Canada, while Universal Pictures (through United International Pictures), handled in the United Kingdom and Ireland, Concorde Filmverleih handled in Germany, UGC Fox Distribution handled in France, and Toho-Towa handled in Japan.)
- Release dates: September 11, 1998 (TIFF); December 11, 1998 (limited)
- Running time: 121 minutes
- Countries: United States; United Kingdom; Germany; France; Japan
- Language: English
- Budget: $17 million
- Box office: $16.3 million

A Simple Plan is a 1998 crime thriller film directed by Sam Raimi and written by Scott B. Smith, based on Smith's 1993 novel. The neo-noir film stars Bill Paxton, Billy Bob Thornton, and Bridget Fonda. Set in rural Minnesota, the story follows brothers Hank (Paxton) and Jacob Mitchell (Thornton), who, along with Jacob's friend Lou (Brent Briscoe), discover a crashed plane containing $4.4 million in cash. The three men and Hank's wife Sarah (Fonda) go to great lengths to keep the money a secret but begin to doubt each other's trust, resulting in lies, deceit, and murder.

Development of the film began in 1993 before the novel was published. Mike Nichols purchased the film rights, and the project was picked up by Savoy Pictures. After Nichols stepped down, the film adaptation became mired in development hell, with Ben Stiller and John Dahl turning down opportunities to direct it. After Savoy closed in November 1997, the project was sold to Paramount Pictures. John Boorman was hired to direct, but scheduling conflicts led to his replacement by Raimi. An international co-production between the United States, United Kingdom, Germany, France, and Japan, the film was financed by Mutual Film Company, its investors, and Newmarket Capital Group, which allocated a budget of $17 million. Principal photography began in January 1998 and concluded in March after 55 days of filming in Wisconsin and Minnesota. The score was produced and composed by Danny Elfman.

A Simple Plan premiered at the 1998 Toronto International Film Festival, where it was met with critical acclaim. The film's appearance at the festival preceded a limited release in the United States on December 11, 1998, followed by a general release in North America on January 22, 1999. It underperformed at the North American box office, grossing $16.3 million, but was critically acclaimed, with reviewers praising the film's production, including the storytelling, performances, and Raimi's direction. A Simple Plan earned multiple awards and nominations, among them two Academy Award nominations, one for Best Supporting Actor (Thornton) and one for Best Adapted Screenplay (Smith).

== Plot ==
Hank is an accountant at a feed mill in Wright County, Minnesota with a pregnant wife, Sarah. After visiting their parents graves on New Year's Eve, Hank, his simpleminded brother Jacob, and Jacob's friend Lou Chambers stumble upon a crashed airplane in the woods. Inside is a dead man and a bag containing $4.4 million in $100 bills. Lou and Jacob persuade Hank not to turn the money in, so he proposes keeping the money at his house until the snow melts and the plane is found. If the missing money goes unnoticed, they will split it between them and leave town. Seeing their truck on the side of the road, Sheriff Carl Jenkins stops by to help, and Jacob blurts out a mention of the plane. When Carl leaves, the three men make a pact to keep the secret, but Hank later tells Sarah.

Sarah suggests Hank replace $500,000 of the money to avoid suspicion when the plane is found, but says not to tell the others. Hank makes an excuse for Jacob to take him back to the crash site, and surreptitiously returns some cash while Jacob stays by his station wagon pretending to fix a flat tire. Farmer Dwight Stephanson happens by on a snowmobile. Thinking their cover is blown, Jacob bludgeons Dwight with a tire iron. Believing Dwight is dead, and wanting to protect his brother, Hank gets on the snowmobile to take it to a hiding place for the body, but Dwight comes to and tells Hank that Jacob attacked him. Hank suffocates him before staging an accident where it appears Dwight had driven his snowmobile off an embankment.

Having learned from Jacob about Dwight's murder, Lou drunkenly demands his portion of the money from Hank and insinuates that he might go to the authorities otherwise. Sarah later gives birth to her daughter Amanda.

Sarah learns that the money was a ransom for a kidnapped heiress, who was killed by her kidnappers in December. She convinces Hank to frame Lou for Dwight's murder by getting him drunk, tricking him into falsely confessing to the killing, and recording the confession. Though Jacob frightens Hank by seeming to go against him, the two acquire Lou's confession. When he realizes he has been duped, Lou pulls a gun on Hank and a shootout ensues, with Jacob shooting Lou dead. Lou's wife Nancy shoots at Hank, and he shoots back, killing her. Hank and Jacob call the police and say the deaths were a domestic quarrel turned murder-suicide. Jacob, deeply tormented by the things he and Hank have done, begins to have misgivings.

Carl calls in the brothers to answer questions from FBI Agent Neil Baxter, who is searching for the plane. Fed up with the pressure and his own guilt, Hank plans to return all the money to the plane, but is stopped after Sarah confronts him about their lack of prospects and meager lifestyle. As Hank meets Carl and Baxter to begin the search, Sarah discovers Baxter is actually one of the kidnappers posing as an FBI agent to find the money, and alerts Hank, who steals a revolver from Carl's office. The four men split up in the woods to search for the plane. When Carl finds it, Hank tries to warn him about Baxter, but Baxter kills Carl before he can react. Baxter demands Hank retrieve the money from the plane, presuming he is unarmed; Hank shoots a distracted Baxter dead after retrieving the $500,000 from the plane.

Hank starts to concoct another story to tell the authorities, but Jacob balks, saying he cannot live with all that they have done. He proposes that Hank kill him and frame Baxter for his death. When Hank refuses, Jacob puts a pistol to his own head. Realizing he cannot avoid it, Hank kills Jacob with Baxter's gun.

Hank is cleared of wrongdoing by real FBI agents, who reveal that they had recorded the serial numbers of some of the ransom bills, which, if spent, will lead them to the culprit eventually. He returns home and burns the money as Sarah protests and begs him not to.

== Cast ==
- Bill Paxton as Hank Mitchell
- Billy Bob Thornton as Jacob Mitchell
- Bridget Fonda as Sarah Mitchell
- Brent Briscoe as Lou Chambers
- Gary Cole as Vernon Bokovsky / FBI Agent Neil Baxter
- Jack Walsh as Tom Butler
- Chelcie Ross as Sheriff Carl Jenkins
- Becky Ann Baker as Nancy Chambers
- Tom Carey as Dwight Stephanson

== Production ==
=== Development ===
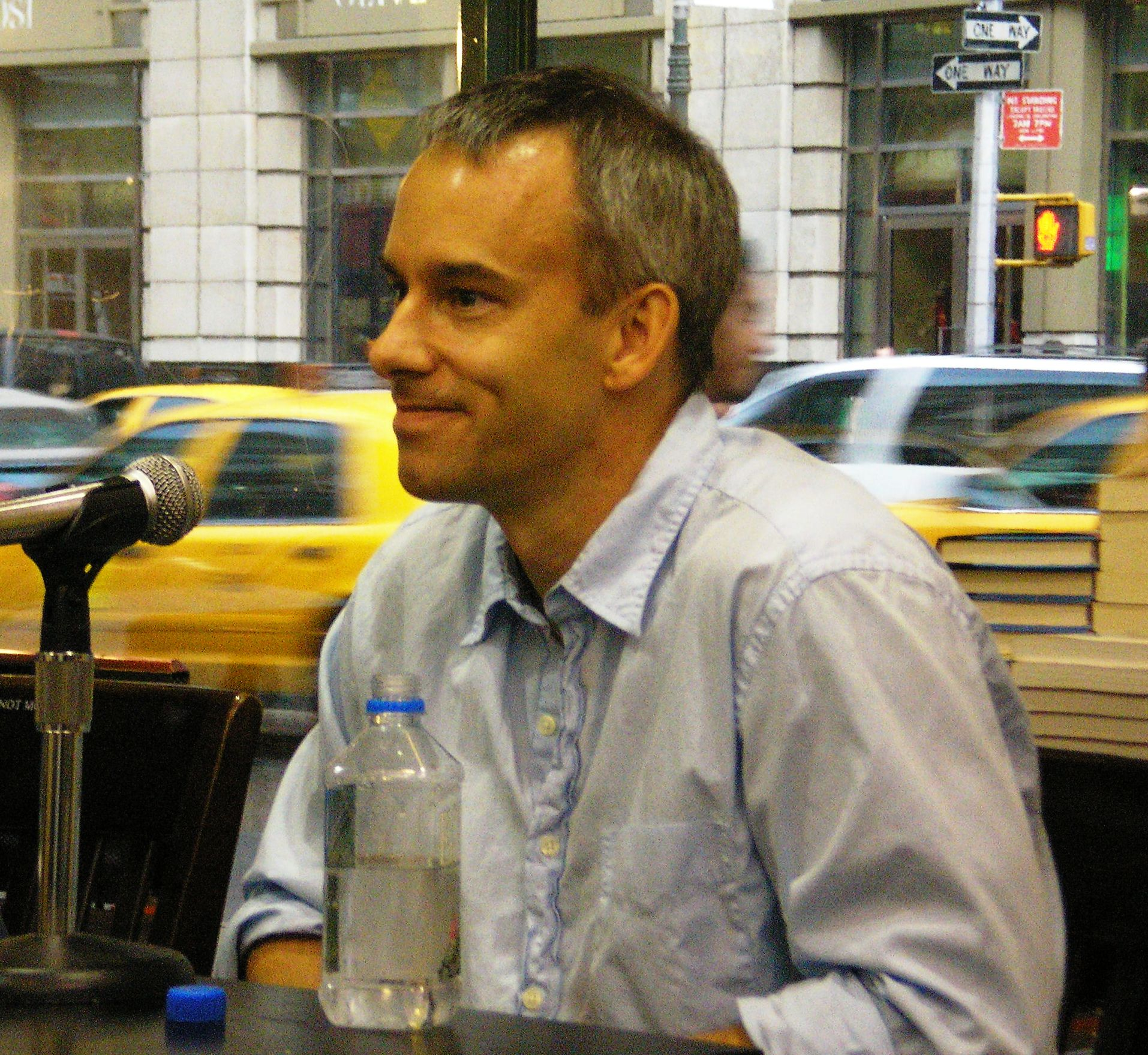
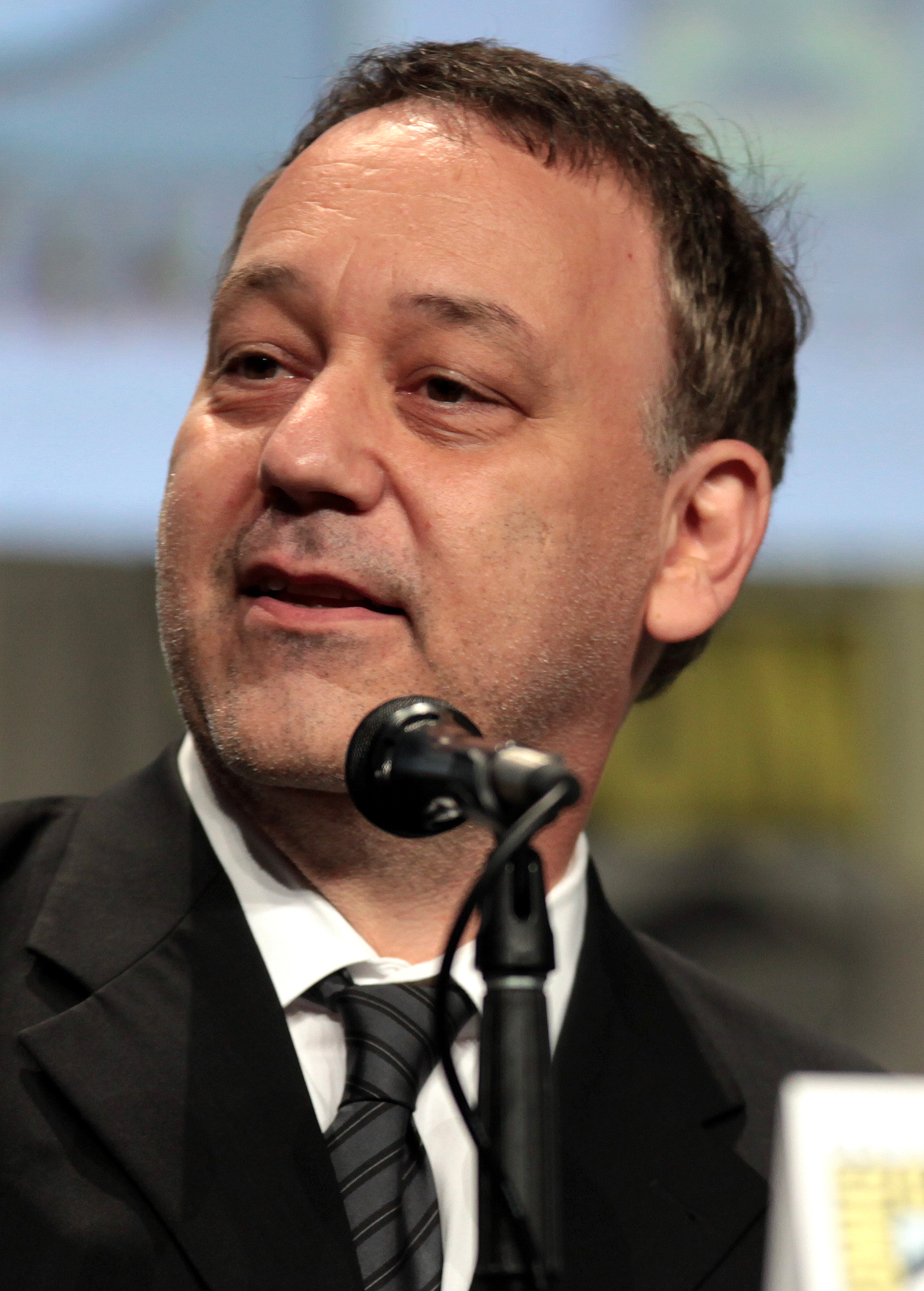
Scott B. Smith (left), who wrote the adaptation of his novel, and Sam Raimi, who directed the film.

After Scott B. Smith had published a short story for The New Yorker, the magazine's fiction editor learned of his then-unpublished novel A Simple Plan before reading it and forwarding it to an agent. Shortly thereafter, Smith learned that Mike Nichols was interested in purchasing the film rights. Nichols spent a weekend reading the book, before contacting Smith's agent and finalizing a deal the following Monday morning. Nichols purchased the rights for his production company Icarus Productions for $250,000, with an additional $750,000 to come later from a studio interested in pursuing the project. Smith's manuscript of A Simple Plan was optioned for development at an independent film studio, Savoy Pictures. Nichols later stepped down from the project, due to scheduling conflicts with a planned film adaptation of All the Pretty Horses.

After learning of A Simple Plan from Nichols, Ben Stiller joined the project and signed a two-picture directing deal with Savoy. He spent nine months working on the script with Smith. During preproduction, Stiller had a falling out with Savoy over budget disputes. Unable to secure financing from another studio, Stiller left the film.

In January 1995, John Dahl was announced as director, with Nicolas Cage set to appear in a starring role, and filming likely to start during the following summer in the southern hemisphere or in Canada during the following winter. In November 1995, following a series of box office failures, Savoy announced that it was retreating from the film industry. The studio was later acquired by Silver King Broadcasting/Home Shopping Network, whose chairman, Barry Diller, put A Simple Plan up for sale. This resulted in both Dahl and Cage leaving the production.

The project was purchased by Paramount Pictures, where producer Scott Rudin hired John Boorman to direct the film. Boorman cast Bill Paxton and Billy Bob Thornton in the respective leading roles of Hank and Jacob Mitchell. The film marked Paxton and Thornton's second on-screen collaboration after One False Move (1992). Paxton learned of the novel A Simple Plan from his father five years before securing the role of Hank. He stated, "... for five years, there was a whole list of actors and directors who kind of marched through it. Billy Bob and I were set to do these roles in 1997, and then it fell apart. That was the cruelest twist for an actor, to get a part you dreamed you'd get and then they decide to scrap the whole thing."

Boorman took part in location scouting, and filming was set to begin during the first week of January 1998. When a second investor left the project, Paramount refused to fully finance the $17 million production itself. Although Boorman was able to secure financing, the studio feared that filming would not be finished before the end of winter. Boorman ran into scheduling conflicts, and left the film. Paramount then hired Sam Raimi, who saw the film as an opportunity to direct a character-driven story that differed from his earlier works, which were highly stylized or dependent on intricate camera movements. Raimi did not have time to scout locations due to studio constraints. He relied on the previous areas visited during Boorman's involvement. Rudin considered casting Anne Heche as Hank's wife Sarah Mitchell. In December 1997, it was announced that Bridget Fonda had secured the role. The film marked her second collaboration with Raimi after Army of Darkness (1992).

The film was co-financed by Mutual Film Company and Newmarket Capital Group as part of a joint venture that was formed by the two studios. Mutual's international partners—the United Kingdom's BBC, Germany's Tele-München, Japan's Toho-Towa/Marubeni and France's UGC-PH—also financed the production in exchange for distribution rights in their respective territories and equity stakes on the film on a worldwide basis. Paramount acquired the North American distribution rights.

=== Writing ===
Ben [Stiller] really taught me how to write a script. I don't know that he ever explicitly said it, but by imagining the script as a verbal description of a movie, the movie that I wanted the book to be. That's very simple, but it really was the key to everything for me—just imagining what was on the page. I was shortchanging the visual in my script, concentrating on dialogue, which I imagine is a very common first-time screenwriter's mistake, and to suddenly just do it visually opened up everything for me.

— Smith on writing the screenplay.

The original script that Smith had written for Nichols was 256 pages long, the equivalent of a four-and-a-half hour film. Smith kept Nichols's suggestion of having the story take place in Minnesota, rather than in Ohio, where the book is set. The Minnesota Film Board joined the project and remained involved throughout principal photography. After the novel was published, Nichols left the project during the script's early draft stages. When Stiller became involved, he and Smith spent nine months rewriting the screenplay.

For the adaptation, certain visual changes were made from the 335-page novel. Smith explained that one change involved the discovery of the crashed plane. His script had Lou Chambers "throwing [a] snowball to uncover the plane ... In the book, they're just walking and they find it." Rudin wanted to change the focus of the story to Hank and Jacob, and ordered Smith to shorten the screenplay to 120 pages. Smith explained, "I had to work to make Hank a more rational character, less evil." The shortening of the script also resulted in the character of Sarah having a smaller role, and Jacob's involvement being much larger than in the book. After Billy Bob Thornton was cast as Jacob, Smith omitted the character's overweight appearance from the novel. Smith described the film adaptation as being less violent than the book, explaining that it was Raimi's decision "to be more restrained [and] bring out the characters."

=== Filming ===
==== Principal photography ====
Filming was scheduled to begin in Delano, Minnesota, but the production was forced to temporarily relocate to northern Wisconsin for enough snow to shoot. Principal photography began on January 5, 1998. The film marked production designer Patrizia von Brandenstein's second collaboration with Raimi, after The Quick and the Dead (1995). She found the weather difficult during filming, as she had to await good conditions to complete the necessary exterior work. Describing the overall look of the film, she stated, "We created a muted black-and-white color scheme to suggest a morality tale, the choices given between right and wrong." The production began shooting in Ashland and Saxon, Wisconsin, where most of the film's exterior shots were filmed. An actual plane, with one side cut open, was one of two planes used to depict the crashed aircraft.

The production returned to Minnesota, where it was plagued by a lack of snow. To solve this problem, the filmmakers assembled a special effects team to create a combination of real snow and fake synthetic snow that was made from shaved ice. The home of Lou Chambers and his wife Nancy was filmed in an abandoned house in Delano, which cinematographer Alar Kivilo described as "a very difficult [filming] location with very low ceilings and no heating". Brandenstein and the art department were tasked with designing the set inside the home.

The interior of the crashed plane was filmed on a soundstage. A second plane, designed to have frosted windows, was attached to a gimbal, about five feet off the ground. To match the interior with footage shot in Wisconsin, the art department built a set with real trees and a painted backdrop. To depict Hank being attacked by a flock of crows inside the plane, puppets were used to attack Paxton as he appeared on screen, while two live crows were used to attack an animatronic replica of the actor. A separate soundstage was used to create two sets depicting the interiors of Hank's home. Principal photography concluded on March 13, 1998, after 55 days of filming.

==== Cinematography ====
This is a change of pace for me because the film is not about shots, but the performance within the frame. I wanted the camera work to be invisible and just allow the actors to tell this very thrilling story.

— Sam Raimi (director)

Director of photography Alar Kivilo stated that, upon reading the script, his first approach to making the film "was to make the look simple, allowing the characters to tell the story." He was influenced by the visuals of In Cold Blood (1967), the work of photographer Robert Frank and photographs taken during location scouting in Delano, Minnesota. Kivilo originally wanted to shoot the film in widescreen using the anamorphic format, but decided against it due to the lack of lenses available and the film's restricted budget. He shot the film using Panavision Platinum cameras with the company's Primo series of prime lenses. He used Eastman Kodak 5246 250ASA Vision film stock for all of the daylight scenes and tungsten-balanced 5279 Vision 500T film stock for the night scenes.

Despite the intense weather conditions, Kivilo believed that the overcast skies created a "gray, somber, stark look." He also chose not to use any lighting for daytime exterior scenes. For exterior scenes shot during sunnier filming days, computer-generated imagery (CGI) was used to re-create the overcast skies and counter any inconsistencies caused by the falling snow. In depicting the shootout in Lou's home, Kivilo's intent was to "keep things quite sketchy in the lighting and not be clear about exactly what was happening." The camera department lit a China ball from the ceiling to depict a dimly lit kitchen light that would reveal Nancy holding a shotgun. Flash photography guns were used to depict the muzzle flashes during the shootouts.

=== Music ===
The score was produced and composed by Danny Elfman, who was drawn to the film after learning of Raimi's involvement; the film marks his third collaboration with the director. The instruments included alto and bass flutes, re-tuned pianos and banjos, zithers, and hand drums. The soundtrack album, titled A Simple Plan: Music from the Motion Picture Soundtrack, was released on January 26, 1999. AllMusic's William Ruhlmann wrote, "There are occasional moments that suggest the composer's more characteristic approach, but his writing is in the service of a smaller, if still intense cinematic subjects, and it is appropriately restrained."

==== Track listing ====
No.	Title	Length
1.	"Main Title"	4:44
2.	"The Moon"	0:57
3.	"A Change of Heart"	1:07
4.	"The Farm"	1:31
5.	"Betrayal Part 1"	3:16
6.	"The Badge"	1:08
7.	"Stop It"	1:40
8.	"Tracks in the Snow"	4:37
9.	"Death"	4:54
10.	"Burning $"	1:50
11.	"End Credits"	5:10
12.	"Preachin' the Blues (The Imperial Crowns)"	3:42
13.	"So Sleepless You (Jolene)"	4:21
14.	"Deliver Me (Tina and the B Sides)"	4:50
Total length:		43:47

== Release ==
A Simple Plan premiered at the 23rd Toronto International Film Festival on September 11, 1998. On December 11, 1998, the film opened in limited release at 31 theaters, and grossed $390,563 in its first week, with an average of $12,598 per theater. More theaters were added during the limited run, and on January 22, 1999, the film officially entered wide release by screening in 660 theaters across North America. The film ended its North American theatrical run on May 14, 1999, having grossed $16,316,273, below its estimated production budget of $17 million. The film was released on VHS and DVD on June 22, 1999, by Paramount Home Entertainment.

== Reception ==
=== Critical response ===
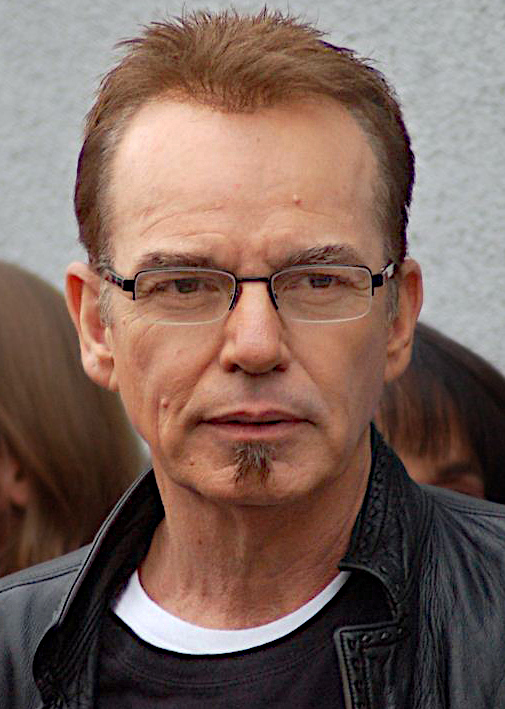
Billy Bob Thornton was critically lauded for his performance as Jacob Mitchell, which earned him an Academy Award nomination for Best Supporting Actor.

Reviewing the film during the Toronto International Film Festival, Glen Lovell of Variety compared it to Fargo (1996), writing, "The key differences are in emphasis and tone: Fargo is deadpan noir; A Simple Plan...is a more robust Midwestern Gothic that owes as much to Poe as Chandler." In an "early review" of the film prior to its limited release, Roger Ebert and Gene Siskel gave the film a "Two Thumbs Up" rating on their syndicated television program Siskel and Ebert at the Movies. In a later episode, Ebert ranked A Simple Plan at number four on his list of the "Best Films of 1998". Siskel, writing for the Chicago Tribune, said that the film was "an exceedingly well-directed genre picture by [Raimi] ... [who] does an excellent job of presaging the lethal violence that follows. From his very first images we know that bodies are going to start to pile up." Ebert also named Bill Paxton as his suggested pick for the Best Actor nomination at the 1999 Academy Awards.

John Simon of the National Review wrote, "the dialogue and characterization are rich in detail, and the constant surprises do not, for the most part strain credibility".

Online film critic James Berardinelli praised the acting, and commended Thornton's performance as "the most striking that A Simple Plan has to offer." After Paxton's death in February 2017, Matt Zoller Seitz of RogerEbert.com cited Paxton's performance as Hank to be the best in his career, stating that "The film might constitute Paxton's most sorrowful performance as well as his most frightening ... an outwardly ordinary man who has no idea what kind of evil he's capable of."

Owen Gleiberman of Entertainment Weekly described the film as being "lean, elegant, and emotionally complex—a marvel of backwoods classicism." Janet Maslin of The New York Times called it a "quietly devastating thriller directed by [Raimi] ... who makes a flawless segue into mainstream storytelling." Edward Guthmann of the San Francisco Chronicle wrote, "for Raimi, whose mastery of visual effects has driven all of his previous films, A Simple Plan marks a tremendously successful break from the past. He's drawn lovely, complex performances from Paxton and Thornton and proven that he can work effectively—and movingly—in a minor emotional key."

In a negative review, Richard Schickel of Time stated, "There's neither intricacy nor surprise in the narrative, and these dopes are tedious, witless company." Schlomo Schwartzberg of Boxoffice felt that the film "clutters up the story with unnecessary acts of violence and murder, and mainly stays on the surface, offering little more than cheap jolts of melodrama."

In an interview with Empire Magazine, Sam Raimi gave his opinion about the lukewarm box-office reception and the Fargo comparisons:

“I don't think it was overshadowed by [Fargo]. It just didn't get a big release. Maybe people didn't like it as much as they could have.“

Review aggregator Rotten Tomatoes reveals 91% of 76 reviews of the film were positive, with an average rating of 8.3/10. The website's consensus summarizes: "A Simple Plan is a riveting crime thriller full of emotional tension." Another review aggregator, Metacritic, assigned the film a weighted average score of 82 out of 100, based on 28 reviews from mainstream critics, indicating "universal acclaim". Audiences polled by CinemaScore gave the film an average grade of "B-" on an A+ to F scale.

== Accolades ==
Award	Category	Recipient(s)	Result
Academy Awards	Best Supporting Actor	Billy Bob Thornton	Nominated
Academy Awards	Best Screenplay – Based on Material Previously Produced or Published	Scott B. Smith	Nominated
Awards Circuit Community Awards	Best Adapted Screenplay	Scott B. Smith	Nominated
Blockbuster Entertainment Awards	Best Actress – Suspense	Bridget Fonda	Nominated
Blockbuster Entertainment Awards	Best Supporting Actress – Suspense	Becky Ann Baker	Nominated
Boston Society of Film Critics Awards	Best Supporting Actor	Billy Bob Thornton	Won (Note: Tied with William H. Macy for A Civil Action, Pleasantville and Psycho.)
Boston Society of Film Critics Awards	Best Supporting Actress	Bridget Fonda	3rd Place
Boston Society of Film Critics Awards	Best Cinematography	Alar Kivilo	Nominated
Chicago Film Critics Association Awards	Best Supporting Actor	Billy Bob Thornton	Won
Chicago Film Critics Association Awards	Best Screenplay	Scott B. Smith	Nominated
Chicago Film Critics Association Awards	Best Original Score	Danny Elfman	Nominated
Chlotrudis Awards	Best Supporting Actor	Billy Bob Thornton	Won
Cognac Crime Film Festival	Special Jury Prize	Sam Raimi	Won (Note: Tied with Thursday.)
Critics' Choice Movie Awards	Best Picture		Nominated
Critics' Choice Movie Awards	Best Supporting Actor	Billy Bob Thornton (also for Primary Colors)	Won
Critics' Choice Movie Awards	Best Screenplay – Adaptation	Scott B. Smith	Won
Dallas–Fort Worth Film Critics Association Awards	Best Picture		Nominated
Dallas–Fort Worth Film Critics Association Awards	Best Supporting Actor	Billy Bob Thornton	Won
Edgar Allan Poe Awards	Best Motion Picture Screenplay	Scott B. Smith	Nominated
Golden Globe Awards	Best Supporting Actor – Motion Picture	Billy Bob Thornton	Nominated
Las Vegas Film Critics Society Awards	Best Score	Danny Elfman	Won
Los Angeles Film Critics Association Awards	Best Supporting Actor	Billy Bob Thornton	Won (Note: Tied with Bill Murray for Rushmore and Wild Things.)
National Board of Review Awards	Top Ten Films		9th Place
National Board of Review Awards	Best Screenplay	Scott B. Smith	Won
National Society of Film Critics Awards	Best Supporting Actor	Billy Bob Thornton	3rd Place
Online Film & Television Association Awards	Best Supporting Actor	Billy Bob Thornton	Won
Online Film & Television Association Awards	Best Screenplay – Based on Material from Another Medium	Scott B. Smith	Nominated
Online Film & Television Association Awards	Best Drama Score	Danny Elfman	Nominated
Online Film Critics Society Awards	Best Supporting Actor	Billy Bob Thornton	Won
Online Film Critics Society Awards	Best Adapted Screenplay	Scott B. Smith	Nominated
San Diego Film Critics Society Awards	Best Supporting Actor	Billy Bob Thornton	Won
San Diego Film Critics Society Awards	Best Adapted Screenplay	Scott B. Smith	Won
Satellite Awards	Best Actor in a Supporting Role in a Motion Picture – Drama	Billy Bob Thornton	Nominated
Saturn Awards	Best Action/Adventure/Thriller Film		Nominated
Saturn Awards	Best Supporting Actor	Billy Bob Thornton	Nominated
Screen Actors Guild Awards	Outstanding Performance by a Male Actor in a Supporting Role	Billy Bob Thornton	Nominated
Southeastern Film Critics Association Awards	Best Supporting Actor	Billy Bob Thornton	Runner-up
USC Scripter Awards		Scott B. Smith (author/screenwriter)	Nominated
Voices in the Shadow Dubbing Festival	Special Jury Prize	Gianni Williams (for the dubbing of Billy Bob Thornton)	Won
Writers Guild of America Awards	Best Screenplay – Based on Material Previously Produced or Published	Scott B. Smith	Nominated
