= The Ruins (film) =

2008 film by Carter Smith

- Theatrical release poster
- Directed by: Carter Smith
- Screenplay by: Scott B. Smith
- Based on: The Ruins by Scott Smith
- Produced by: Stuart Cornfeld; Jeremy Kramer; Chris Bender
- Starring: Jena Malone; Jonathan Tucker; Shawn Ashmore; Laura Ramsey; Joe Anderson
- Cinematography: Darius Khondji
- Edited by: Jeff Betancourt
- Music by: Graeme Revell
- Production companies: DreamWorks Pictures; Spyglass Entertainment; Red Hour Films
- Distributed by: DreamWorks/Paramount Distribution
- Release date: 4 April 2008 (United States)
- Running time: 90 minutes
- Countries: Australia; United States
- Language: English
- Budget: $25 million
- Box office: $22.9 million

The Ruins is a 2008 natural horror film directed by Carter Smith in his feature film directorial debut, and written by Scott B. Smith, based on his 2006 novel of the same name. The film stars Jena Malone, Jonathan Tucker, Shawn Ashmore, Laura Ramsey, and Joe Anderson. The story follows a pair of couples on vacation in Mexico, who join a tourist to visit a remote Mayan ruin inhabited by a carnivorous vine growth. Stuart Cornfeld, Jeremy Kramer, and Chris Bender produce, with Ben Stiller serving as an executive producer.

The Ruins was released by DreamWorks/Paramount Distribution on 4 April 2008. The film received mixed reviews from critics, and was a box-office bomb; only earning $22.9 million at the worldwide box office against a budget of $25 million.

== Plot ==
Two young American couples Amy, Jeff, Eric, and Stacy go on vacation to Mexico. They meet Mathias, a German tourist, who is looking for his brother Heinrich. His last known location is an archaeological dig at a remote Mayan ruin in the jungle. They are also joined by Dimitri, Mathias' friend. The group reaches the ruins of a Mayan temple and are confronted by Mayan villagers armed with knives, bows, arrows, and a gun. When Amy accidentally steps in some vines, the villagers become forceful and even more agitated, shooting and killing Dimitri. The rest of the group flees up the steps of the ruins.

At the top, they find an abandoned camp and a shaft in the center. They hear a phone ringing from somewhere inside the ruins. The group lowers Mathias down the shaft with a rope, but it breaks, dropping Mathias and paralyzing him. Amy and Jeff descend the temple steps to reason with the Mayans, but to no success. In anger, Amy throws a clump of vines at a young boy, whom the Mayans promptly kill. They realize the Mayans are afraid of the vines and will not let them leave as they have all touched them. Later, Amy and Stacy descend the shaft to rescue Mathias with a body board.

The next morning, a tendril of vine has crept into a wound on Stacy's leg. The vines have also wrapped themselves around Mathias' lower legs and eaten them down to the bone. Jeff and Eric are barely able to remove the vines from Stacy but cannot get them off of Mathias. The phone rings again from deep in the shaft, so Amy and Stacy descend again. In a small, vine-covered room, the two find the body of Heinrich's friend and a broken phone. They then realize that the ringing sound was made by the flowers of the vine. As Amy touches one flower, the vines attack and the two barely escape.

As Mathias' condition worsens, Jeff amputates his legs to avoid an infection. Stacy becomes manic at Eric comforting a distraught Amy and accuses them of having sex. While the four argue, the vines suffocate Mathias.

In the morning, Stacy shows the group the vines moving underneath her skin. Jeff uses a knife to remove the vine from her leg and back. Stacy tries to take the knife, claiming that the vines are in her head. The rest of the group doubt her claims until a vine moves under the skin in her forehead.

While the rest of the group is sleeping, Stacy uses the knife to slice her body open to get the vines out. When Jeff tries to calm her down, she flails the knife at him, cutting his palm. Eric also tries to calm her, but she fatally stabs him in the chest. While the rest try to restrain Stacy, the vines drag a dead Eric away. Overcome with remorse, Stacy begs Amy to kill her, and Jeff mercy kills her.

Jeff makes a plan for Amy to escape. He smears Stacy's blood all over her, carries her to the bottom of the temple as though she were dead, and lays her on the ground. He then provokes the Mayans, drawing their attention away from Amy. Amy gets up and runs through the jungle with the Mayans chasing after her. Jeff is killed by the Mayan leader with a gunshot to the head. After escaping from the Mayans, Amy reaches the Jeep and manages to drive away.

After Amy's escape, Dimitri's two Greek friends are seen walking through the woods and come up to the temple, looking for him.

=== Alternate ending ===
In the unrated version, as Amy manages to drive away in the jeep, her face is crawling with moving vines.

In a deleted scene and extended version of this ending, a groundskeeper walks among the headstones in a cemetery, whistling "Frère Jacques". When he hears the same tune coming from a grave, he finds Amy's grave with several red flowers around the headstone. As the caretaker reaches for one, the scene cuts to black.

Director Carter Smith told an interviewer, "We shot a bunch of different stuff to see which one would work best with the finished film. There's a testing process you go through with a studio movie and as frustrating as it can be, it also really gives you a good sense of how an audience feels about an ending. Our final decision was informed by what audiences found the most satisfying after watching a really punishing film. I love the ending of the book, but if the movie had ended the same way, the audience would have wanted to kill themselves."

== Cast ==
- Jena Malone as Amy "Ame"
- Jonathan Tucker as Jeff
- Shawn Ashmore as Eric
- Laura Ramsey as Stacy "Stace"
- Joe Anderson as Mathias
- Sergio Calderón as Lead Mayan
- Jesse Ramirez as Mayan Bowman
- Balder Moreno as Mayan Horseman
- Dimitri Baveas as Dimitri
- Patricio Almeida Rodriguez as Taxi Driver
- Luis Antonio Ramos as Mayan Rifleman
- Walter Quispe as Mayan Rifleman
- Pauline Whyman as Wailing Woman
- Chris Argirousis as Greek
- Alexander Gregory as Greek
- Michelle Atkinson as Archeologist
- Bar Paly as Archeologist
- Jordan Patrick Smith as Heinrich
- Karen Strassman as Additional Vine Vocal (voice)

== Production ==
The shooting of this film took place in Queensland, Australia. According to The Miami Herald, "Smith was two-thirds done with the book when Ben Stiller's production company, Red Hour Films, bought the screen rights based on an outline. 'They told me they wanted me to write the screenplay, too,' Smith says. 'So while I was writing the last third of the book, I already knew I'd be adapting it for the movies.'"

Director Carter Smith said, "If the audience is going to buy that this vine moves and can get into your body and all that, the world of the film has to be absolutely realistic. We took elements from lots of different real-life plants when designing our vine. It's in practically every single shot in the film after the characters reach the hill, so it has to look like something that could really be growing there. But it also has to look menacing once you realize what it is capable of doing."

== Release ==
The teaser trailer was released in December 2007. A red band trailer was aired on 21 February 2008. It was released on 20 June 2008 in the UK.

=== Box office ===
The Ruins was released in the US on 4 April 2008. In the US box office it debuted at #5 making $8,003,421. After 3 weeks it exited the top 10. It has grossed $17,432,844 domestically and $22,818,256 worldwide.

=== Critical reception ===
On review aggregator Rotten Tomatoes, The Ruins holds an approval rating of 51%, based on 97 reviews, and an average rating of 5.5/10. The site's consensus reads, "Despite a solid cast and truly frightening source material, The Ruins flounders, thanks to a weak script and an excess of gore." On Metacritic, the film has a weighted average score of 44 out of 100, based on 15 critics, indicating "mixed or average reviews". Audiences polled by CinemaScore gave the film an average grade of "D+" on an A+ to F scale.

James Berardinelli gave the film three stars out of four, saying, "The Ruins does what a good psychological horror movie should do: rely on tension rather than gore to achieve its aims. This bleak, edgy motion picture isn't concerned with appealing to the masses that flock to multiplexes to enjoy the spatterings of the latest serial slasher or the hollow weirdness of a PG-13 ghost story."

The Miami Herald gave a mixed review: "The Ruins is, with one major caveat, about as good an adaptation of Scott Smith's bestselling novel as Hollywood was ever going to make...except for a stray shot here and there – like a glimpse of the vine's tendrils making off with a severed foot – the great potential for unintentional guffaws is mostly avoided."

=== Home media ===
The Ruins was released on DVD and Blu-ray on 8 July 2008 in both R-rated and unrated versions. It debuted at #4 on the DVD Sales Chart, selling 189,128 copies. As of 3 August 2008, The Ruins has sold 343,414 copies. The R-rated edition includes a commentary by director Carter Smith and editor Jeff Betancourt, three featurettes (Making The Ruins, Creeping Death, Building The Ruins), additional scenes (Rain, Celebration, Going Over The Escape Plan, Alternate Ending), and trailers. The unrated edition includes the theatrical cut and extra material, and also an alternate ending and optional commentary with additional scenes. An unrated Blu-ray Disc edition is also available with identical features.
