= Magnavox Presents Frank Sinatra =

- Genre: Musical special
- Written by: Fred Ebb
- Directed by: Marty Pasetta
- Starring: Frank Sinatra; Gene Kelly
- Country of origin: United States
- Original language: English
- No. of episodes: 1

Production
- Executive producer: Alfred di Scipio
- Producer: Howard W. Koch
- Running time: 60 minutes
- Production company: Bristol Productions

Original release
- Network: NBC
- Release: November 13, 1973

Related
- Frank Sinatra: In Concert at the Royal Festival Hall; Sinatra: The Main Event

Magnavox Presents Frank Sinatra (or Ol' Blue Eyes Is Back) is an NBC musical television special starring Frank Sinatra broadcast on November 18, 1973. The special was written by Fred Ebb, directed by Marty Pasetta, and produced by Howard W. Koch. The announcer for the special was Hank Simms. Gene Kelly, the guest star on the special, had last worked with Sinatra on the 1949 film On the Town.

The television special and subsequent album, Ol' Blue Eyes Is Back, represented a return to performing for Sinatra, who had retired in June 1971. The special was seen by an estimated audience of 40 million.

The special was sponsored by Magnavox as part of a $9 million advertising campaign for their 1974 products, with the special representing the largest single amount that the company had spent on advertising in its history. Commercials during the special marketed Magnavox products, including Odyssey, the first video game console.

The song "Can't Do That Anymore" had originally been written by Ebb for his abandoned musical with John Kander and Dale Wasserman, Wait for Me, World!. Ebb found making the special a disheartening experience, and was upset by Sinatra's treatment of his employees and Kelly. Ebb has said that Sinatra had originally wanted the comedian Redd Foxx to be his guest on the special, but Ebb, not knowing how to write for Foxx, had persuaded Sinatra to choose Kelly. Sinatra had been unhappy with the decision to choose Kelly and nicknamed him "Shanty". Ebb described Kelly as "humble and gracious". Sinatra's changes to the script left the special with holes that remained unresolved due to Sinatra's refusal to read the script until the day of filming. Ebb also said that Sinatra had not wanted to record the scenes with Kelly on the day, though he changed his mind when Kelly appeared for filming.

The special was nominated for two Primetime Emmy Awards at the 26th Primetime Emmy Awards. Pasetta was nominated for the Emmy Award for Best Directing in Comedy-Variety, Variety or Music and Koch and Sinatra were nominated for the Primetime Emmy Award for Outstanding Variety, Music, or Comedy Special.

== Song list ==
1. "My Way" (Instrumental)
2. "You Will Be My Music"
3. "I Get a Kick Out of You"
4. "Street of Dreams"
5. "I've Got You Under My Skin"
6. "I've Got the World on a String"
7. Saloon trilogy: "Last Night When We Were Young"/"Violets for Your Furs"/"Here's That Rainy Day"
8. "Take Me Out to the Ball Game" (Instrumental)
9. "I Begged Her" (Instrumental)
10. Medley with Gene Kelly: "Can't Do That Anymore"/"Take Me Out to the Ball Game"/"For Me and My Gal"/"New York, New York"
11. "Nice 'n' Easy"
12. "Let Me Try Again"
13. "Send in the Clowns"
14. "You Will Be My Music" (Reprise)
