= Dallas–Fort Worth Film Critics Association Awards 1998 =

Annual US film awards ceremony

4th Dallas-Fort Worth Film Critics Association Awards
- Date: January 5, 1999
- Location: Dallas, Texas
- Country: United States
- Presented by: Dallas-Fort Worth Film Critics Association
- Website: dfwfilmcritics.net

The 4th Dallas-Fort Worth Film Critics Association Awards, given in January 1999, honored the best filmmaking of 1998. The organization, founded in 1990, includes 49 film critics for print, radio, television, and internet publications based in north Texas.

== Winners ==
- Best Picture:
  - Saving Private Ryan
- Best Director:
  - Steven Spielberg - Saving Private Ryan
