= Howard W. Koch =

Film producer (1916–2001)

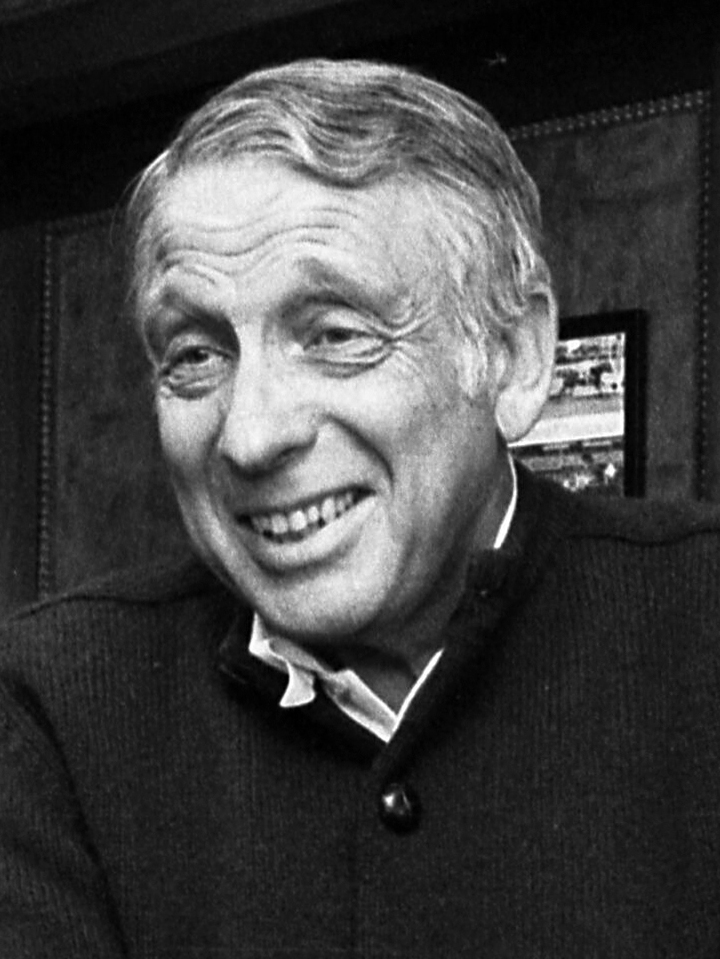
- Koch in 1978
- Born: Howard Winchel Koch; April 11, 1916; New York City, U.S.
- Died: February 16, 2001 (aged 84); Beverly Hills, California, U.S.
- Occupations: Director; producer
- Spouse: Ruth Pincus (m. 1937)
- Children: 2, including Hawk Koch
- Relatives: Alan Blinken (son-in-law); Kathy Kaehler (granddaughter-in-law); Cooper Koch (great-grandson); Payton Koch (great-grandson)

Howard Winchel Koch (April 11, 1916 – February 16, 2001) was an American film producer and director. He served as president of the Academy of Motion Picture Arts and Sciences and as head of film production at Paramount Pictures, and directed and produced numerous films, including The Manchurian Candidate (1962), The Odd Couple (1968), Airplane! (1980) and its 1982 sequel, and Ghost (1990). At the 62nd Academy Awards, he was honored the Jean Hersholt Humanitarian Award for his "outstanding contributions to humanitarian causes". He also received four Primetime Emmy Award nominations, three of which were for producing Academy Awards ceremonies.

Koch was the father of film producer Hawk Koch, and the great-grandfather of actor Cooper Koch and film editor Payton Koch.

== Life and career ==
Koch was born on April 11, 1916 in New York City, to a Jewish family. He attended DeWitt Clinton High School and the Peddie School in Hightstown, New Jersey. He began his film career as an employee at Universal Studios office in New York then made his Hollywood filmmaking debut in 1947 as an assistant director. He worked as a producer for the first time in 1953 and a year later made his directing debut. In 1964, Paramount Pictures appointed him head of film production, a position he held until 1966 when he left to set up his own production company. He had a production pact with Paramount for over 15 years.

Among his numerous television productions, Koch produced the Academy Awards show on eight occasions, from the 44th Academy Awards in 1972 to the 55th Academy Awards in 1983 (except in 1974, 1977, 1979 and 1981). Dedicated to the industry, he served as President of the Academy of Motion Picture Arts and Sciences from 1977 to 1979. In 1990, the Academy honored him with the Jean Hersholt Humanitarian Award at the 62nd Academy Awards and in 1991, he received the Frank Capra Achievement Award from the Directors Guild of America.

Together with actor Telly Savalas, Koch owned the thoroughbred racehorse Telly's Pop, winner of several important California races for juveniles including the Norfolk Stakes and Del Mar Futurity.

Koch suffered from Alzheimer's disease and died in at his home in Beverly Hills, California on February 16, 2001. He had two children from a marriage of 64 years to Ruth Pincus, who died in March 2009. In 2004, his son Hawk Koch was elected to the Board of Governors of the Academy of Motion Picture Arts and Sciences, and in 2013 he became its president, making them the first father and son to serve as presidents of the organization.

== Filmography ==
=== Feature film ===
Year	Title	Director	Producer
1953	War Paint	No	Yes
1954	Beachhead	No	Yes
1954	Shield for Murder	Yes	Yes
1955	Big House, U.S.A.	Yes	Yes
1956	Rebel in Town	No	Yes
1957	Untamed Youth	Yes	No
1957	Bop Girl Goes Calypso	Yes	No
1957	Jungle Heat	Yes	No
1957	The Girl in Black Stockings	Yes	No
1957	Fort Bowie	Yes	No
1958	Violent Road	Yes	No
1958	Frankenstein 1970	Yes	Yes
1958	Born Reckless	Yes	No
1958	Andy Hardy Comes Home	Yes	No
1959	The Last Mile	Yes	No
1962	Sergeants 3	No	Yes
1962	The Manchurian Candidate	No	Yes
1963	Come Blow Your Horn	No	Yes
1964	Robin and the 7 Hoods	No	Yes
1965	None but the Brave	No	Yes
1968	The Odd Couple	No	Yes
1970	On a Clear Day You Can See Forever	No	Yes
1971	A New Leaf	No	Yes
1971	Plaza Suite	No	Yes
1972	Last of the Red Hot Lovers	No	Yes
1973	Badge 373	Yes	No
1975	Jacqueline Susann's Once Is Not Enough	No	Yes
1977	The Other Side of Midnight	No	Yes
1980	Airplane!	No	Yes
1982	Some Kind of Hero	No	Yes
1982	Airplane II: The Sequel	No	Yes
1990	Ghost	No	Yes

=== Television ===
Year	Title	Director	Producer	Notes
1957	Maverick	Yes	No	1 episode
1958	Cheyenne	Yes	No	1 episode
1959	The Untouchables	Yes	No	4 episodes
1959	Hawaiian Eye	Yes	No	2 episodes
1960	The Gun of Zangara	Yes	No	TV movie from The Untouchables
1961	Miami Undercover	Yes	No	38 episodes
1973	Magnavox Presents Frank Sinatra	No	Yes	TV special
1977	Texaco Presents Bob Hope in a Very Special Special: On the Road with Bing	Yes	No	TV special

== Awards and nominations ==
Year	Award	Category	Nominated work	Result
1962	Directors Guild of America Awards	Outstanding Directorial Achievement in Television	The Untouchables (Episode: "The Unhired Assassin")	Nominated
1974	Primetime Emmy Awards	Outstanding Comedy-Variety, Variety or Music Special	Magnavox Presents Frank Sinatra	Nominated
1977	Primetime Emmy Awards	Outstanding Achievement in Coverage of Special Events — Programs	48th Academy Awards	Nominated
1978	Primetime Emmy Awards	Outstanding Achievement in Coverage of Special Events — Programs	50th Academy Awards	Nominated
1980	Primetime Emmy Awards	Outstanding Program Achievement — Special Events	52nd Academy Awards	Nominated
1990	Academy Awards	Jean Hersholt Humanitarian Award	–	Won
1991	Directors Guild of America Awards	Frank Capra Achievement Award	–	Won
1995	Temecula Valley International Film Festival	Lifetime Achievement Award	–	Won

Non-profit organization positions
Preceded by Walter Mirisch	President of Academy of Motion Pictures, Arts and Sciences; 1977-1979	Succeeded by Fay Kanin
