= A Simple Plan (novel) =

1993 thriller novel by Scott Smith

- First edition
- Author: Scott Smith
- Language: English
- Genre: Thriller
- Publisher: Knopf
- Publication date: August 31, 1993
- Publication place: United States
- Media type: Print (Hardcover and Paperback)
- Pages: 335 pp
- ISBN: 0-679-41985-3
- OCLC: 27187407
- Dewey Decimal: 813/.54 20
- LC Class: PS3569.M5379759 S57 1993

A Simple Plan is a 1993 thriller novel by Scott Smith. The New York Times review said the book had "emotional accuracy with an exceptionally skilled plot." A film adaptation, directed by Sam Raimi, was released in 1998; according to the Times review, the novel is so dark that the story was adjusted to soften the ending.

== Plot ==
Three men find an airplane crashed in a rural Northern Ohio forest. The pilot is dead and the cockpit contains a gym bag with $4.4 million in hundred dollar bills. They decide to keep the money, dividing it equally, but their plans go wrong when others come close to discovering their secret, resulting in multiple murders.

== Critical reception ==
In its 1993 review, The New York Times called A Simple Plan a "beautifully controlled and disturbing first novel." The Chicago Tribune described the book as "a tragic journey as compelling, resolute and relentlessly grim as The Treasure of the Sierra Madre."
