= Scott Smith (author) =

American author and screenwriter (born 1965)

Scott B. Smith
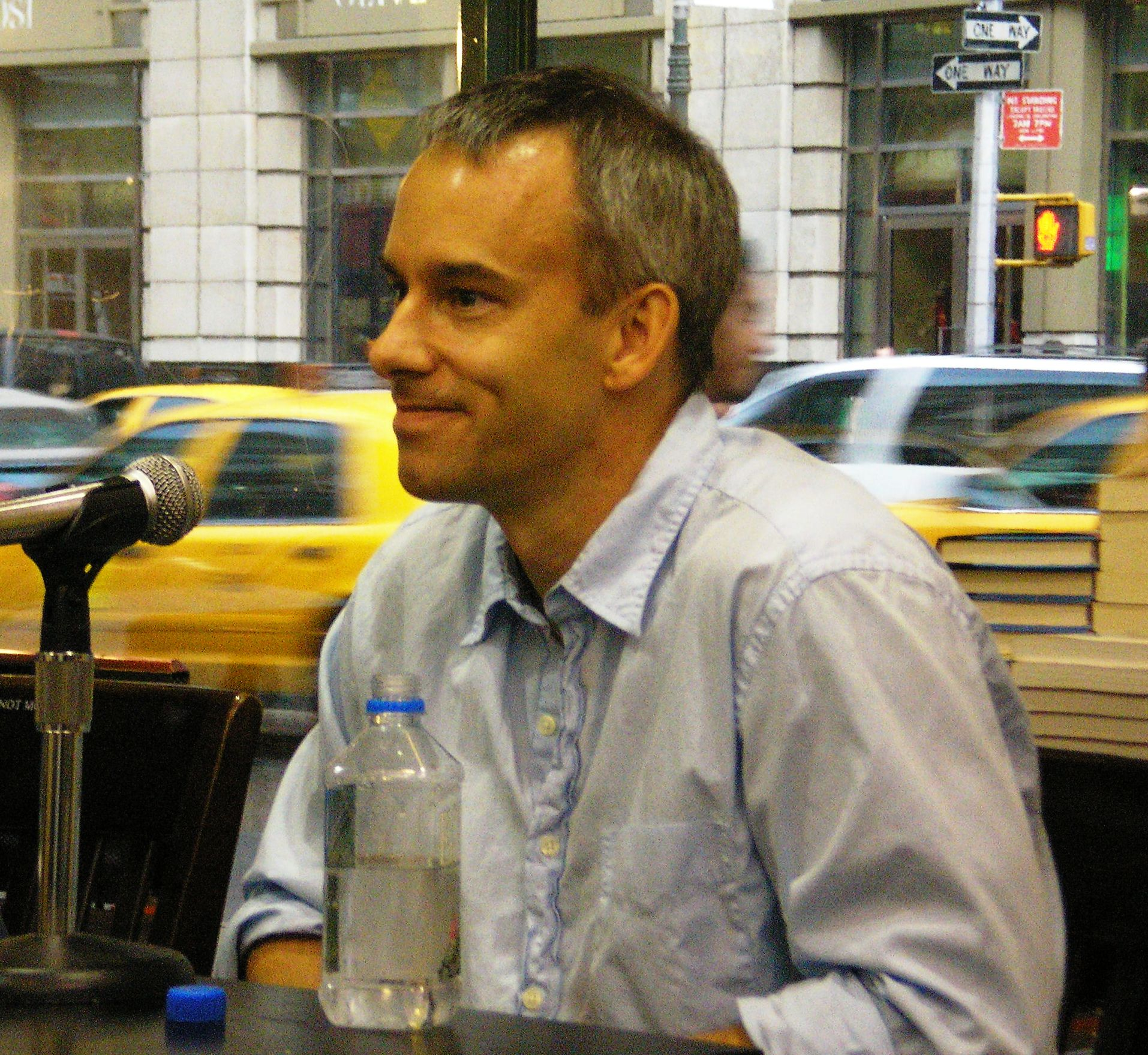
- Smith in 2006
- Born: July 13, 1965 (age 61); Summit, New Jersey, U.S.
- Education: Dartmouth College; Columbia University (MFA)
- Occupations: Author; screenwriter; executive producer
- Writing career
- Language: English
- Genres: Horror, thriller
- Notable works: A Simple Plan (1993), The Ruins (2006)

Scott Bechtel Smith (born July 13, 1965) is an American author and screenwriter. He has written two novels, A Simple Plan (1993) and The Ruins (2006). Both were adapted into films – A Simple Plan (1998) and The Ruins (2008), respectively – based on Smith's own screenplays. He also wrote the screenplays for the films Siberia (2018) and The Burnt Orange Heresy (2019). His screenplay for A Simple Plan earned him a nomination for the Academy Award for Best Adapted Screenplay.

== Early life and education ==
Smith was born in Summit, New Jersey in 1965 and moved to Toledo, Ohio as a child. He is the son of Linda and Doug Smith. He told the Pittsburgh Tribune-Review reviewer Regis Behe that, as a child, he read his father's "castoffs," the novels of Clive Cussler and Jack Higgins. "Growing up, I also read Ray Bradbury and Stephen King," he said. "I just had a sense of how to create these places that aren't real world places, but just with this provisional attachment to the real world. It is very much of your imagination, and I felt very much I could do that." After graduating from Dartmouth College and from Columbia University with a Master of Fine Arts degree in writing, he took up writing full-time.

== Career ==
He has published two novels, A Simple Plan and The Ruins. His screen adaptation of A Simple Plan earned him an Academy Award nomination. The screenplay won a Broadcast Film Critics Association Award and a National Board of Review Award.

His second novel, The Ruins, was also adapted into a film, released on April 4, 2008. Stephen King called it "the best horror novel of the new century." King had also called A Simple Plan "simply the best suspense novel of the year."

In 2016, it was announced that TNT had greenlit a pilot for Civil, a new TV series created by Smith about a second American Civil War following a hotly contested presidential election. A TV series adaptation of William Gibson's The Peripheral was commissioned in 2018 by Amazon, with Smith as writer. Smith created the series, and served as executive producer and showrunner. Vincenzo Natali directed the show's pilot.

== Bibliography ==
=== Novels ===
- A Simple Plan (1993), ISBN 0-312-95271-6
- The Ruins (2006), ISBN 1-4000-4387-5

=== Short stories ===
- "The Egg Man," Open City Magazine, Issue #20 (2005)
- "Up in Old Vermont", originally published in Seize the Night: New Tales of Vampiric Terror (2015) by Gallery Books, edited by Christopher Golden
- "Dogs", originally published in Dark Cities (2017) by Titan Books, edited by Christopher Golden
- "Christmas in Barcelona", originally published in Hark! The Herald Angels Scream (2018) by Anchor Books, edited by Christopher Golden
- "The New Boyfriend", originally published in Ten-Word Tragedies (2019) by PS Publishing, edited by Christopher Golden & Tim Lebbon

=== Translations ===
- Italian by Mario Biondi, "Un piano semplice", Rizzoli, 1993
- Slovak (by Katarína Jusková): Ruiny. - Bratislava: Ikar 2006. ISBN 978-80-551-1369-2
- Spanish by Jaume Subira Ciurana, "Las Ruinas", Ediciones B, Barcelona 2007. ISBN 978-84-666-3349-9
- Swedish by Olov Hyllienmark "Ruinerna"
- Danish by Henrik Enemark Sørensen
- Polish by Jan Kraśko - "Prosty Plan"
- Spanish by Rosa Corgatelli "Un plan simple"

== Filmography ==
Film

- A Simple Plan (1998)
- The Ruins (2008)
- Siberia (2018)
- The Burnt Orange Heresy (2019)

Television

- The Peripheral (2022)
