= Fracture (2007 film) =

2007 film by Gregory Hoblit

- Theatrical release poster
- Directed by: Gregory Hoblit
- Screenplay by: Daniel Pyne; Glenn Gers
- Story by: Daniel Pyne
- Produced by: Charles Weinstock
- Starring: Anthony Hopkins; Ryan Gosling; David Strathairn; Rosamund Pike; Embeth Davidtz; Billy Burke; Cliff Curtis; Fiona Shaw; Bob Gunton
- Cinematography: Kramer Morgenthau
- Edited by: David Rosenbloom
- Music by: Mychael Danna; Jeff Danna
- Production companies: Castle Rock Entertainment; Weinstock Entertainment; M7 Filmproduktion
- Distributed by: New Line Cinema (Worldwide); Warner Bros. Pictures (Germany and Austria)
- Release date: April 20, 2007 (US)
- Running time: 114 minutes
- Countries: United States; Germany
- Language: English
- Box office: $92 million

Fracture is a 2007 legal psychological thriller film directed by Gregory Hoblit and written by Daniel Pyne and Glenn Gers. Starring Anthony Hopkins and Ryan Gosling, it follows a man (Hopkins) who shoots his unfaithful wife and then engages in a battle of wits with a young assistant district attorney (Gosling). The supporting cast includes David Strathairn, Rosamund Pike, Embeth Davidtz, Billy Burke, Cliff Curtis, Fiona Shaw, and Bob Gunton.

Upon its premiere on April 20, 2007, the film received generally positive reviews from critics, who praised its performances (particularly those of Hopkins and Gosling), style, and tension, though some criticized the plot as implausible. It was a box office success, earning $92 million worldwide.

== Plot ==
Theodore "Ted" Crawford, a wealthy Irish aeronautical engineer living in Los Angeles, confirms that his wife, Jennifer, is having an affair with police detective Robert Nunally. Confronting his wife, Crawford shoots her. He calls the police, including Nunally, who enters the house cautiously, negotiating with Crawford for both to put down their guns. Crawford confesses he shot his wife. Recognizing the victim and being subtly goaded by Crawford, Nunally becomes enraged and assaults him. Jennifer, despite her injuries, is not killed, but left in a coma.

Crawford is arrested for attempted murder. He signs a full confession and waives the right to an attorney, even though he will face the rising star deputy district attorney William "Willy" Beachum at trial. Beachum is about to take up a position at the prestigious law firm Wooton Sims and considers the case an open-and-shut matter. He discovers that Crawford's handgun could not have been used in the shooting because it does not match shell casings at the crime scene and, in fact, has not been fired. Yet, he proceeds with the trial on the strength of the signed confession.

At the trial, Crawford informs the court that the arresting officer, Nunally, was having an affair with his wife, assaulted him during his arrest, and was present during his interrogation. Crawford's confession is therefore ruled inadmissible as evidence, being, as the judge puts it, fruit of the poisonous tree. Nunally comes up with a scheme to plant false evidence to implicate Crawford, which Beachum rejects.

With no new evidence to present, Beachum concedes the trial is lost, and Crawford is acquitted. Consequently, Nunally commits suicide outside the court, and Beachum loses his position at Wooton Sims. However, he begins to see his DA job as a means to fight for justice for such people as Jennifer. Crawford himself observes the change, commenting sarcastically that Beachum has "found God". This motivates Beachum to continue searching for evidence, almost obsessively.

Realizing that Crawford plans to dispose of the only eyewitness to the crime, Beachum obtains a court order to keep Jennifer on life support but is unable to prevent the hospital staff from turning off the machines.

A mix-up of cell phones causes Beachum to realize that Nunally and Crawford both used the same type of gun, a .45 caliber Glock 21. Before the crime, Crawford switched his and Nunally's guns in the hotel room where Jennifer and Nunally secretly met. Crawford shot his wife with Nunally's gun, then reloaded it. When the detective arrived on the scene, carrying Crawford's gun, both put down their weapons as a preliminary move in negotiations. When Nunally rushed over to Jennifer, Crawford switched the guns again. Nunally had then unwittingly holstered the murder weapon, allowing the unused gun to be taken as evidence.

Beachum confronts Crawford with his deductions. With Jennifer now dead, the bullet lodged in her head can now be retrieved and matched with Nunally's gun. Crawford brazenly confesses, confident he is protected by the double jeopardy principle. However, Beachum informs Crawford that he will be tried for taking Jennifer off life support, which constitutes murder because of its malice aforethought. The waiting police arrest Crawford. The film ends with a new trial about to begin, Beachum prosecuting, and Crawford surrounded by a team of defense attorneys.

== Cast ==
- Anthony Hopkins as Theodore "Ted" Crawford
- Ryan Gosling as William "Willy" Beachum
- David Strathairn as District Attorney Joe Lobruto
- Rosamund Pike as Nikki Gardner
- Embeth Davidtz as Jennifer Crawford
- Billy Burke as Lt. Rob Nunally
- Cliff Curtis as Detective Flores
- Fiona Shaw as Judge Robinson
- Bob Gunton as Judge Gardner
- Xander Berkeley as Judge Moran
- Alla Korot as Russian Translator
- Tom Virtue as Attorney Apley
- Josh Stamberg as Norman
- Zoe Kazan as Mona

== Production ==
In February 1999, it was reported Castle Rock Entertainment Pitch from Daniel Pyne about a cat and mouse game between a hapless District Attorney and a man who thinks that he has committed the perfect crime with Pyne also set to direct. In November 2005, it was reported New Line Cinema had picked up the film from Castle Rock under the title Fracture with Anthony Hopkins and Ryan Gosling set to star, and Gregory Hoblit set to direct with Glenn Gers having performed a rewrite.

== Reception ==
=== Box office performance ===
Fracture was released on April 20, 2007. It opened in 2443 theaters in the United States and grossed $3.7 million on its opening day and $11 million during its opening weekend, ranking No. 2 with a per theater average of $4508. During its second weekend, it dropped to No. 4 and grossed $6.8 million– $2789 per theater average. During its third weekend, it moved up to No. 3 and made $3.7 million– $1562 per theater average.

Fracture went on to gross $39 million in the United States and Canada, and $52.3 million overseas, for a worldwide total of $92.1 million.

=== Critical response ===
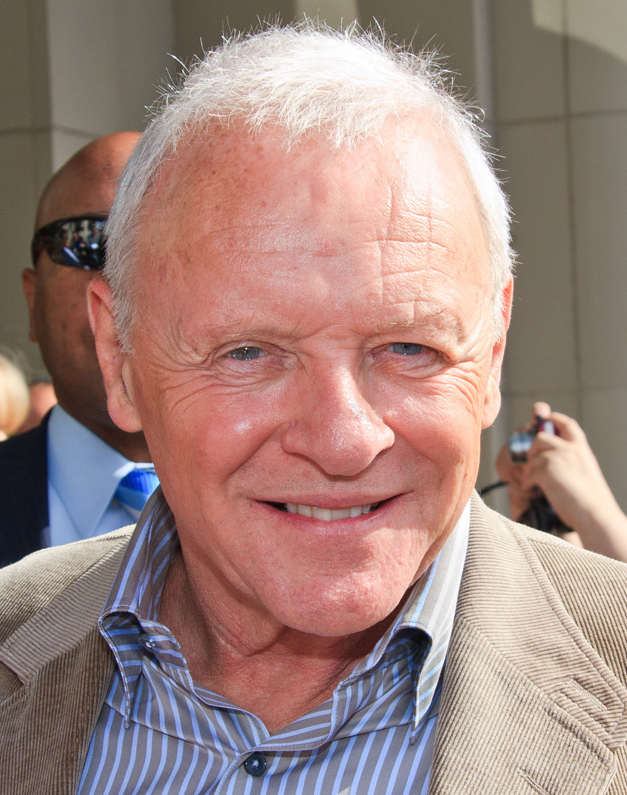
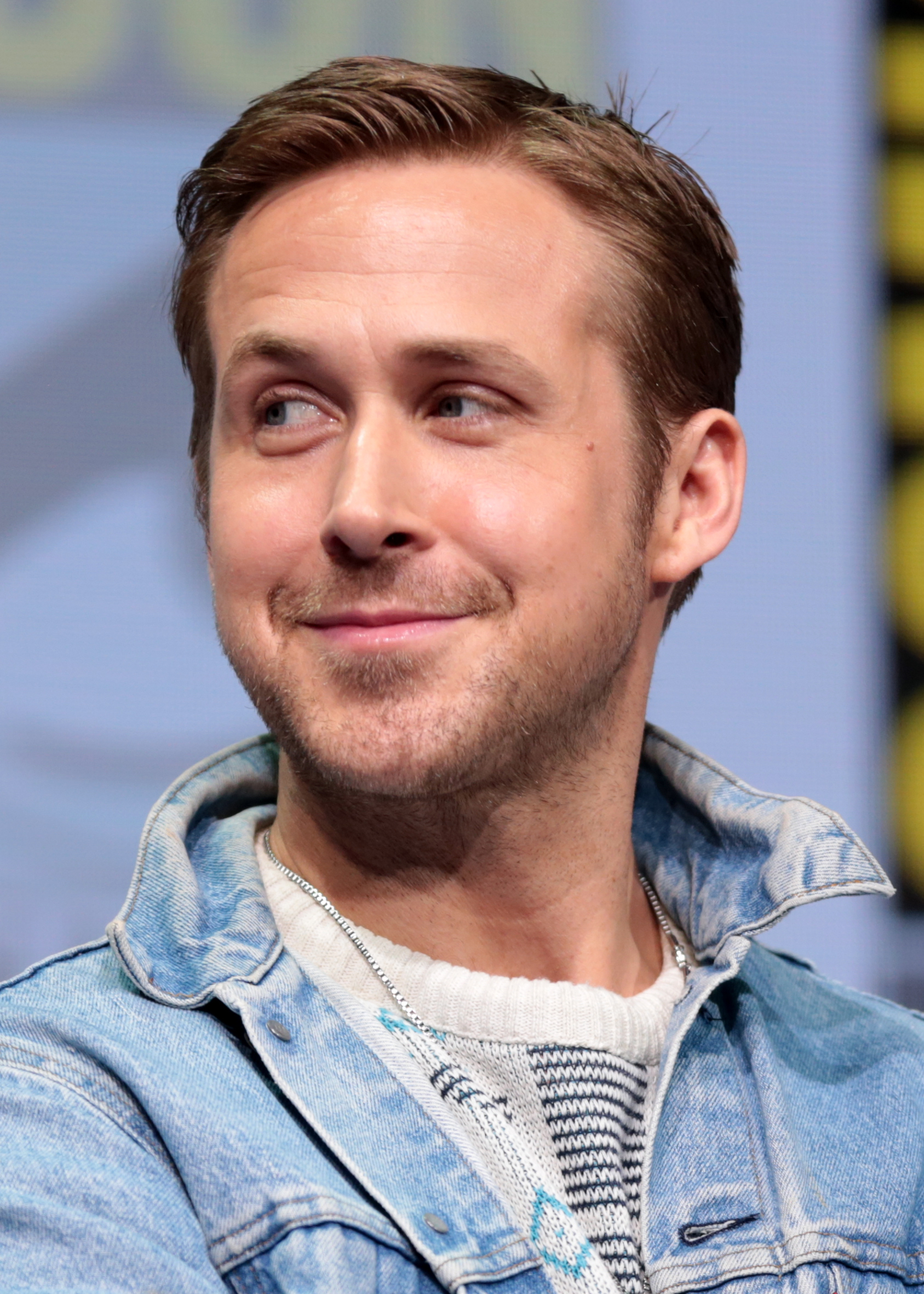
The performances of both Anthony Hopkins and Ryan Gosling were particularly praised by most of the film critics.

Fracture opened in 2007 to positive reviews from critics. Review aggregator Rotten Tomatoes reports that 73% of critics have given the film a positive review, based on 171 reviews, and an average rating of 6.5/10. The website's critics consensus states: "Though Fracture's plot is somewhat implausible, the onscreen face-off between Gosling and Hopkins overshadows any faults." On Metacritic, the film has a weighted average score of 68 out of 100, based on 35 critics, which indicates "generally favorable" reviews. Audiences polled by CinemaScore gave the film an average grade of "A−" on an A+ to F scale.

Peter Rainer of The Christian Science Monitor gave the film a positive review, praising both Hopkins' and Gosling's performances, noting that "although Hopkins obviously has played a variation on this role before, his Ted is more playfully malevolent than Hannibal Lecter ever was". About the film itself, he stated: "The plot's many complications pretty much all add up, which is a rarity these days for a murder mystery. It's possible that audiences don't even care anymore if a film makes sense as long as it's entertaining". Owen Gleiberman of Entertainment Weekly also gave the film a positive review, and like Rainer, he praised the performances of Hopkins and Gosling, noting that "the two actors are terrific". He also stated that "Fracture is working on us, playing us, but that's its pleasure. It makes overwrought manipulation seem more than a basic instinct."

Scott Foundas of The Village Voice gave the film a positive review, praising Gosling's performance, stating: "Gosling is the kind of actor who makes other actors look lazy. He is Brando at the time of Streetcar, or Nicholson in Five Easy Pieces, and altogether one of the more remarkable happenings at the movies today." Claudia Puig of USA Today also gave the film a positive review, praising not only the two leading actors' performances, but also Hoblit's direction, noting that "he also knows how to draw remarkable performances from young actors, with Ed Norton in Primal Fear and Gosling here". She also added about the film that "it's a provocative game that plays out with intelligence and wit." James Berardinelli of ReelViews gave the film three stars out of four, calling the film "gruesomely engaging." William Arnold of Seattle Post-Intelligencer also gave the film a positive review, calling the film "better-than-average", and stated: "It's occasionally quite witty, it's able to tell us a great deal about its characters and their back stories in an economic fashion... its plot swings are surprising and compelling."

Scott Tobias of The A.V. Club gave the film a "B" rating, and also praised Hopkins and Gosling's performances, stating that "not since Lecter has a role been this well suited to Hopkins, whose intelligence and pristine formality as an actor often make him seem alien—or worse, an incorrigible ham. Gosling is equally good in the less showy role of a righteous prosecutor, investing a stock part with as much droll humor and charisma as he can muster." Justin Chang of Variety magazine also gave the film a positive review and stated that the film is "an absorbing legal thriller that can't help but taste like exquisitely reheated leftovers." Philip French of The Guardian wrote that "wily old gander Hopkins running rings around the confident young Gosling is a lot of fun." Manohla Dargis of The New York Times also positively reviewed Hopkins' and Gosling's performances, writing, "Mr. Hopkins and Mr. Gosling navigate the film’s sleekly burnished surfaces and darkly lighted interiors, its procedural twists and courtroom turns without breaking stride or into a sweat."

Ross Bennett of Empire magazine gave the film three stars out of five and stated that "the two leads are on fine form, but the surrounding structure is too familiar from a thousand other films. Still, tense and occasionally twisty stuff." Wesley Morris of The Boston Globe gave the film a mixed review, stating about the film itself and both Hopkins and Gosling: "You needn't actually see Fracture to know that if the charge is acting that winks, these two are guilty." Pete Vonder Haar of Film Threat gave the film two and a half stars out of four, stating, "Fracture may be smarter than the majority of movies out there, but it's not half as clever as it thinks it is." Richard Schickel of Time magazine, like Bennett, Morris and Vonder Haar, gave the film a mixed review, and stated: "It renders passion dispassionate and turns murder into a kind of fashion statement, something we observe without really caring about."

=== Accolades ===
Fracture was nominated for two awards, a Teen Choice Award for Ryan Gosling in the "Choice Movie Actor" category, and a World Soundtrack Award for Mychael Danna in the "Film Composer of the Year" category.

=== Home video ===
The film was released on DVD on August 14, 2007, and on Blu-ray on June 16, 2009.
