= List of awards and nominations received by Thomas Newman =

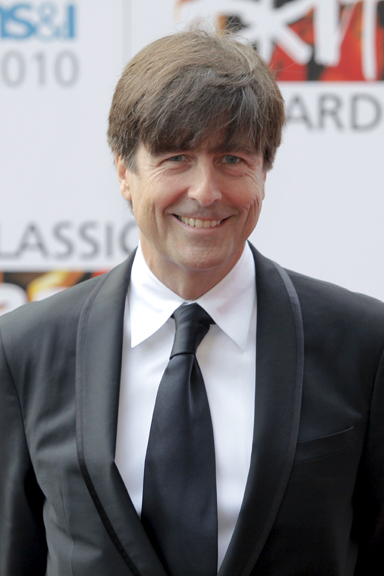
Thomas Newman

This is a list of awards and nominations received by the American film composer Thomas Newman.

As of 2020, Newman has received a total of fifteen Academy Award nominations, however, he has yet to win the award, making him the most nominated living composer to have never won an Oscar, equal to Alex North, who also received 15 unsuccessful nominations. Fourteen of his nominations are in the Best Original Score category, whilst one is for Best Original Song.

He has also received four Golden Globe nominations including two for Best Original Score for 1999's American Beauty and 2019's 1917 and two for Best Original Song, as well as eight Grammy nominations and six wins.

== Major associations ==
=== Academy Awards ===
| Year | Category | Nominated work | Result | Ref. |
|---|---|---|---|---|
| 1995 | Best Original Score | The Shawshank Redemption | Nominated | |
| 1995 | Best Original Score | Little Women | Nominated | |
| 1996 | Best Original Musical or Comedy Score | Unstrung Heroes | Nominated | |
| 2000 | Best Original Score | American Beauty | Nominated | |
| 2003 | Best Original Score | Road to Perdition | Nominated | |
| 2004 | Best Original Score | Finding Nemo | Nominated | |
| 2005 | Best Original Score | Lemony Snicket's A Series of Unfortunate Events | Nominated | |
| 2007 | Best Original Score | The Good German | Nominated | |
| 2009 | Best Original Score | WALL-E | Nominated | |
| 2009 | Best Original Song | "Down to Earth" from WALL-E | Nominated | |
| 2013 | Best Original Score | Skyfall | Nominated | |
| 2014 | Best Original Score | Saving Mr. Banks | Nominated | |
| 2016 | Best Original Score | Bridge of Spies | Nominated | |
| 2017 | Best Original Score | Passengers | Nominated | |
| 2020 | Best Original Score | 1917 | Nominated | |

=== BAFTA Awards ===
| Year | Category | Nominated work | Result | Ref. |
British Academy Film Awards
| 2000 | Best Original Music | American Beauty | Won | |
| 2009 | Best Original Music | WALL-E | Nominated | |
| 2013 | Best Original Music | Skyfall | Won | |
| 2014 | Best Original Music | Saving Mr. Banks | Nominated | |
| 2016 | Best Original Music | Bridge of Spies | Nominated | |
| 2020 | Best Original Music | 1917 | Nominated | |

=== Emmy Awards ===
| Year | Category | Nominated work | Result | Ref. |
Primetime Emmy Awards
| 1991 | Outstanding Main Title Theme Music | Against the Law | Nominated | |
| 2002 | Outstanding Main Title Theme Music | Six Feet Under | Won | |
| 2019 | Outstanding Main Title Theme Music | Castle Rock | Nominated | |
| 2024 | Outstanding Main Title Theme Music | Feud: Capote vs. The Swans | Nominated | |
| 2025 | Outstanding Music Composition for a Limited or Anthology Series, Movie or Special (Original Dramatic Score) | Monsters: The Lyle and Erik Menendez Story (Episode: "Spree") (shared with Julia Newman) | Nominated | |
| 2026 | Outstanding Music Composition for a Limited or Anthology Series, Movie or Special (Original Dramatic Score) | In the Blink of an Eye | Nominated | |

=== Golden Globe Awards ===
| Year | Category | Nominated work | Result | Ref. |
|---|---|---|---|---|
| 2000 | Best Original Score – Motion Picture | American Beauty | Nominated | |
| 2009 | Best Original Song – Motion Picture | "Down to Earth" from WALL-E | Nominated | |
| 2012 | Best Original Song – Motion Picture | "The Living Proof" from The Help | Nominated | |
| 2020 | Best Original Score – Motion Picture | 1917 | Nominated | |

=== Grammy Awards ===
| Year | Category | Nominated work | Result | Ref. |
|---|---|---|---|---|
| 1995 | Best Score Soundtrack for Visual Media | The Shawshank Redemption | Nominated | |
| 1997 | Best Score Soundtrack for Visual Media | Unstrung Heroes | Nominated | |
| 2001 | Best Score Soundtrack for Visual Media | American Beauty | Won | |
| 2003 | Best Instrumental Composition for Title Theme | Six Feet Under | Won | |
| 2003 | Best Instrumental Arrangement for Title Theme | Six Feet Under | Won | |
| 2005 | Best Score Soundtrack for Visual Media | Angels in America | Nominated | |
| 2009 | Best Score Soundtrack for Visual Media | WALL-E | Nominated | |
| 2009 | Best Song Written for Visual Media | "Down to Earth" (Note: (with Peter Gabriel) (from WALL-E) | Won | |
| 2009 | Best Instrumental Arrangement | "Define Dancing" (Note: with Peter Gabriel) (from WALL-E) | Won | |
| 2014 | Best Score Soundtrack for Visual Media | Skyfall | Won | |
| 2015 | Best Score Soundtrack for Visual Media | Saving Mr. Banks | Nominated | |
| 2017 | Best Score Soundtrack for Visual Media | Bridge of Spies | Nominated | |
| 2017 | Best Instrumental Composition for End Title | Bridge of Spies | Nominated | |
| 2021 | Best Score Soundtrack for Visual Media | 1917 | Nominated | |

== Miscellaneous awards ==
| Award | Year | Category | Project | Outcome |
|---|---|---|---|---|
| Annie Award | 2004 | Outstanding Music in an Animated Feature Production | Finding Nemo | Won |
| Classical Brit Award | 2010 | Soundtrack of the Year | Revolutionary Road | Won |
| Saturn Awards | 1999 | Best Film Music | Meet Joe Black | Nominated |
| Saturn Awards | 2000 | Best Film Music | The Green Mile | Nominated |
| Saturn Awards | 2004 | Best Film Music | Finding Nemo | Nominated |
| Saturn Awards | 2017 | Best Film Music | Passengers | Nominated |
| World Soundtrack Awards | 2003 | Best Original Soundtrack of the Year | Road to Perdition | Nominated |
| World Soundtrack Awards | 2005 | Soundtrack Composer of the Year | Lemony Snicket's A Series of Unfortunate Events | Nominated |
| World Soundtrack Awards | 2008 | Best Original Song Written Directly for Film (with Peter Gabriel) for "Down to Earth" | WALL-E | Won |
| World Soundtrack Awards | 2008 | Best Original Score of the Year | WALL-E | Nominated |
