= Monster: The Ed Gein Story =

2025 season of television series

- Promotional release poster
- Showrunner: Ian Brennan
- Starring: Charlie Hunnam; Suzanna Son; Vicky Krieps; Laurie Metcalf; Tom Hollander
- No. of episodes: 8

Release
- Original network: Netflix
- Original release: October 3, 2025

Season chronology
- ← Previous; The Lyle and Erik Menendez Story Next → The Lizzie Borden Story

Monster: The Ed Gein Story is the third season of the American biographical crime drama anthology television series Monster, created by Ian Brennan for Netflix. The season focuses on murderer, graverobber, and suspected serial killer Ed Gein, portrayed by Charlie Hunnam. The cast also includes Suzanna Son, Vicky Krieps, Laurie Metcalf, and Tom Hollander. The season incorporates meta commentary on the cultural obsession with true crime and Gein's influence on Hollywood and pop culture.

It is the third installment in the Monster anthology series, following Monster: The Jeffrey Dahmer Story (2022) and Monsters: The Lyle and Erik Menendez Story (2024). A season based on Ed Gein was announced to be in development on September 14, 2024. It is the first season not helmed by Murphy, with Brennan serving as the sole creator and writer.

Upon its premiere on October 3, 2025, the season received negative reviews and was deemed inferior to its predecessors, with critics panning its meta commentary, subplots, runtime, excessive graphic violence, and factual inaccuracies. While critical responses to Hunnam's performance were divided, he ultimately received nominations for a Primetime Emmy Award, a Golden Globe Award, an Actors Award, and a Critics' Choice Television Award. The season received seven nominations at the 78th Primetime Emmy Awards.

A fourth season, titled Monster: The Lizzie Borden Story, is based on parricide suspect Lizzie Borden and was released on September 17, 2026.

== Premise ==
The series explores the life of murderer and body snatcher Ed Gein through allusions to fictional cultural works inspired by his crimes, such as Psycho (1960), The Texas Chain Saw Massacre (1974), and The Silence of the Lambs (1991).

== Cast and characters ==
=== Main ===
- Charlie Hunnam as Ed Gein, a murderer and body snatcher
- Suzanna Son as Adeline Watkins, a woman romantically involved with Gein
- Vicky Krieps as Ilse Koch, a Nazi war criminal
- Laurie Metcalf as Augusta Gein, Ed Gein's mother
- Tom Hollander as Alfred Hitchcock, an English film director known for directing the horror film Psycho

=== Recurring ===
- Robin Weigert as Enid Watkins
- Charlie Hall as Deputy Frank Worden, Bernice's son
- Tyler Jacob Moore as Sheriff Arthur Schley
- Alanna Darby as Christine Jorgensen, an American actress and the first person to become widely known in the United States for having sex reassignment surgery

=== Guest ===
- Hudson Oz as Henry Gein, Ed Gein's brother
- Nick Carpenter as Daniel Smith
- Olivia Williams as Alma Reville, an English screenwriter and film editor, and Hitchcock's wife
- Joey Pollari as Anthony Perkins, an American actor known for portraying Norman Bates in Psycho
- Mimi Kennedy as Mildred Newman, a psychologist famously known for conducting conversion therapy to Anthony Perkins
- Rondi Reed as Mary Hogan, one of Ed Gein's victims
- Ethan Sandler as Robert Bloch, an American writer known for writing Psycho
- Jackie Kay as Tab Hunter, an American actor and Perkins' boyfriend
- Addison Rae as Evelyn Hartley, an American teenager who mysteriously disappeared in 1953
- Will Brill as Tobe Hooper, an American filmmaker known for directing and co-writing The Texas Chain Saw Massacre (1974)
- Darin Cooper as George Philip Gein, Ed Gein's father
- Lesley Manville as Bernice Worden, a local hardware store owner and Ed Gein's final victim
- Rebecca Tilney as Eleanor Adams
- Christoph Sanders as Randy, a local farmhand
- Elliott Gould as Weegee, a photographer and photojournalist known for his stark black and white street photography in New York City
- Linda Reiter as Nurse Roz Mahoney
- Meighan Gerachis as Nurse Salty Maguire
- Golden Garnick as Ted Levine / Buffalo Bill, an actor who plays the fictional character and main antagonist in The Silence of the Lambs
- Brock Powell as Gunnar Hansen / Leatherface, an actor who plays the fictional character and main antagonist in The Texas Chain Saw Massacre.
- Tobias Jelinek as Richard Speck, an American mass murderer
- Happy Anderson as Jerry Brudos, an American serial killer. Anderson reprises his role from Netflix's Mindhunter.
- Sean Carrigan as Robert Ressler, an FBI special agent who coined the term "serial killer"
- Caleb Ruminer as John E. Douglas, an FBI special agent and criminal profiler

== Episodes ==
No. overall	No. in season	Title	Directed by	Written by	Original release date
20	1	"Mother!"	Max Winkler	Ian Brennan	October 3, 2025
In 1944, Ed Gein lives on an isolated farm in Plainfield, Wisconsin, with his heavily religious mother Augusta, who condemns unmarried women as Jezebels. Despite that, Ed has a girlfriend in town, Adeline Watkins. She shows him photos of Holocaust victims and Ilse Koch, "the Bitch of Buchenwald", with whom Ed becomes obsessed. When his brother announces that he plans to leave with a woman, Ed strikes him down with a log, not realizing at first that his brother is dead, and later lays a fire to cover it up. In grief, his mother suffers a stroke. When they visit a neighbor and she witnesses an unmarried woman chastising the man for beating a dog, Augusta suffers a second stroke, and dies soon afterward. Back home after the funeral, Ed still hears her voice in his head. She orders him to bring her back, which he does by digging up another woman's corpse and bringing it into the house.
21	2	"Sick as Your Secrets"	Max Winkler	Ian Brennan	October 3, 2025
Inspired by Koch who has turned the skin of concentration camp inmates into objects, Ed attempts the same. After a date with Adeline, he takes her home to show her a bowl made of a skull, where she also sees a chair upholstered with skin around a nipple. He introduces her to his "mother", the corpse sitting in a chair turned with the back to them. As she does not answer, Adeline becomes uncomfortable and leaves. Angry at his mother, Ed leaves, taking his rifle with him, to go drinking at a tavern. At first, he compares the owner Mary Hogan to his mother, but after she says she can arrange sexual meetings for him, he shoots her and drags her body away. Later, an employee after discovering the scene tells Sheriff Arthur Schley and Deputy Frank Worden that, when he had left the tavern, he had seen a truck that might have been Ed's. In 1959, film director Alfred Hitchcock and his wife Alma Reville meet Robert Bloch, author of the novel Psycho, who explains that Ed was schizophrenic. Closeted gay actor Anthony Perkins is in a secret relationship with Tab Hunter, when he receives the main role of Norman Bates for the film Psycho. On set, Hitchock leads him to a replica of Ed's house. He implies that he has cast Perkins because he like Ed has a secret that turns into sickness. Perkins meets his psychologist Mildred Newman who suggests conversion therapy, as he expresses disgust at his own desires. At the film's premiere, Hitchcock and his wife sit in the audience to see the reaction. The scene where Norman Bates kills his victim in a shower causes people to get traumatized, scream, and vomit to Hitchcock's delight.
22	3	"The Babysitter"	Max Winkler	Ian Brennan	October 3, 2025
Ed gets questioned by the Sheriff about when he last has seen Mary. After Adeline shows him photos of Christine Jorgensen, a trans woman who has undergone gender-affirming surgery, Ed snatches a ring from a corpse and taking Adeline to the graveyard at night proposes, which she accepts. When she initiates sex, he stops because according to his mother he only should have sex to procreate, and he is not sure about becoming a father. To have him be around children, Adeline introduces him to a family whose babysitter Evelyn Hartley is in a hospital with polio. Alone with the two children, he disturbs them at his farm, showing them the skull bowls and a finger bone and a mask made of a face. After he is fired by the enraged parents, he follows and kidnaps Evelyn. To Adeline, he lies that the babysitting has worked, and she moves in with him. While Evelyn is in his basement tied to a chair, he tries to make "mother"'s corpse beat her with a hammer. In 1964, Perkins ends a relationship with a man because he has started meeting a woman. He only receives role offers similar to Bates and even of Bates again in a sequel. Hitchcock too looks for a new story but the studio only wants films of the new sadistic, exploitative "sex horror" genre. He concludes that he has changed the audience's taste. In 1974, a scene from the film The Texas Chain Saw Massacre depicts the protagonist captured by the villains the same way as Evelyn.
23	4	"Green"	Ian Brennan	Ian Brennan	October 3, 2025
While Ed prepares Evelyn's body, Adeline discovers the corpse in the chair and runs back to her own home. There, she confronts him about the corpse and that he takes her underwear to wear it. He explains the corpse; she finds it macabre but is fascinated. At a hardware store, Ed sees the owner Bernice Worden crying and takes her out to a date. At her home, she lets him wear her underwear and have sex with her, after which she orders him to move in. Back at his home he hallucinates, telling his mother that he moves out and Augusta calling Bernice the "town whore", who has sexual diseases. The next day which is the beginning of hunting season, he fights with Bernice in the store about this and shoots her with a store rifle. When two hunters come to his shed, he chases and kills them with a chainsaw. Later, he shows Adeline in his shed that he has hung up and cut open Bernice's body to make a body suit of her skin. In 1973, inspired by Ed using a chainsaw, Tobe Hooper develops his film The Texas Chainsaw Massacre. On set, he explains the character Leatherface to the cast. He says that Ed wore women, but was not gay because he also had sex with women.
24	5	"Ice"	Ian Brennan	Ian Brennan	October 3, 2025
Adeline begins an affair with a local farmhand, while refusing sex to Ed who wants to start a family. She plans to leave Wisconsin for New York City to pursue a photography career. Pressured by her mother to marry, she attends homemaking classes, hosted by Mrs. Eleanor Adams. Adeline mocks the women's conformity and later appears at Mrs. Adams's funeral dressed in red, laughing. Before leaving town, she photographs Ed's mutilated corpses and encourages him to satisfy his urges on the newly buried Mrs. Adams. In New York, her work is ridiculed by famous photographer Weegee, who does not believe that her photos show human corpses, and she assaults her landlady before fleeing home. Meanwhile, Ed becomes aroused watching a film about Jorgensen and digs up Adams's body. He successfully has sex with the corpse, when he fantasizes her to be Ilse Koch. When Adeline returns, her mother cruelly confesses she once tried to abort her. Ed refuses her advances, telling her she is "too warm", so that she submerges herself in a bathtub filled with ice.
25	6	"Buxom Bird"	Max Winkler	Ian Brennan	October 3, 2025
Sheriff Arthur Schley and his deputy Frank Worden, Bernice's son, who previously had asked his mother to host a Thanksgiving dinner, arrive at her hardware store, discovering bloodstains and a gift box addressed to Ed. At Ed's farmhouse they find the building in disarray, littered with human remains, and a human heart boiling on the stove. While Schley and the other officers photograph the crime scene, Frank searches the barn and finds his mother's mutilated corpse hanging upside down. Meanwhile, Ed arrives at the house in his truck, and Schley immediately confronts him about the horrific crimes. Frank then rushes out of the barn and starts attacking him. Schley and other officers pull Frank off of Ed before they arrest Ed. Questioned by Sheriff Schley, Ed claims difficulties to remember things correctly, denies having killed anyone and calls digging up bodies his unusual hobby. At his own suggestion, he takes a polygraph test which brings no new insight. Meanwhile, Adeline is beleaguered by the press, presenting herself as a casual acquaintance while exploiting the notoriety of the case. At Bernice's funeral, she pretends to be a reporter trying to interview Frank and is forced away by Arthur and she scoffs off. Arthur then invites Frank over, and Frank spends Thanksgiving at Arthur's but breaks down over dinner while Arthur cuts the turkey, seeing a vision of Ed cutting his mother and imagining the turkey as his mother.
26	7	"Ham Radio"	Max Winkler	Ian Brennan	October 3, 2025
In 1958, Frank Worden drinks to cope with Bernice's death and turns the Gein estate into an attraction, planning to auction the property as the only way to obtain compensation money. Days before the sale, Ed's house burns down, leaving only his car, which Adeline sells at auction. Now institutionalized, Ed receives $300 in proceeds and asks Nurse Salty to buy him three ham radios and women's lingerie. He converses over the radio with Ilse Koch, who encourages him to ignore those calling him a monster and denies having done anything beyond following orders. But haunted by visions of a golem, she hangs herself in prison. Speaking with Christine Jorgensen, Ed confesses feelings of confusion about his identity and his creation of a "woman suit", reminiscent to Buffalo Bill in The Silence of the Lambs. Christine rebukes him, explaining his desires are rooted in an extremely eroticized misogyny. Nurse Roz bans Ed from crossdressing, prompting violent hallucinations at night in which he kills her. When she appears alive the next morning, Ed breaks down. His doctor informs him that the radios never worked and that he has been speaking to himself, diagnosing him with schizophrenia. Under Roz's supervision, Ed begins taking medication.
27	8	"The Godfather"	Max Winkler	Ian Brennan	October 3, 2025
In the 1970s, Ted Bundy abducts, sexually assaults and kills his victims, cutting off their heads. FBI special agents Robert Ressler and John E. Douglas interview serial killers like Jerry Brudos for offender profiling and Ed, after many have expressed admiration for him. He theorizes that Bundy seeks his mother in his victims and advises them on the kind of hacksaw Bundy might use. Imprisoned murderer Richard Speck forwards to Ed a letter which Bundy has written to Speck. Ed in turn gives it to the police, ultimately leading to Bundy's capture. After the arrest, Ed imagines meeting all serial killers who were inspired by him or idolize him. In the 1980s, Ed is diagnosed with lung cancer and told he has only months to live. Roz, who has become a friend to him, encourages him to write his own story, saying that many people have distorted his story, but he refuses. Adeline visits Ed one final time, confessing her own instability and intent to harm others; Ed urges her to abandon revenge. He later dies peacefully, imagining a reunion with his mother Augusta, who tells him he has "made a name for himself". Some time later, a group of teenage delinquents vandalize Ed and his mother’s graves. One of the boys sees apparitions of the characters inspired by Ed: Norman Bates, Leatherface, and Buffalo Bill. Ed’s ghost watches as the teenagers leave, before starting a chainsaw and dancing off into the night. In a scene that could variously be interpreted as a flashback or the afterlife, Ed and his mother sit on their front porch, enjoying the sunshine and drinking lemonade. She turns to him and says, "only a mother could love you".

== Production ==
=== Development ===
On September 16, 2024, it was announced that the third season of Monster will focus on murderer and suspected serial killer Ed Gein. On October 4, it was confirmed that the season would be titled The Original Monster, exploring Ed Gein's life as the first "celebrity serial killer" and examining how true crime evolved into a pop culture phenomenon. The season was retitled to Monster: The Ed Gein Story in August 2025.

It is the first season of the Monster anthology series not helmed by Ryan Murphy as a co-creator.

=== Casting ===
On September 16, 2024, it was announced that Charlie Hunnam had been cast to portray Gein. On October 15, it was announced that Laurie Metcalf, Tom Hollander, and Olivia Williams had joined the cast, as Augusta Gein, Alfred Hitchcock and Alma Reville, respectively. In February 2025, it was announced that Suzanna Son had been cast as a series regular in an undisclosed role. The full cast was announced in August 2025.

=== Filming ===
On October 5, 2024, it was reported that principal photography for the season was scheduled to begin on October 31. On November 23, it was reported that filming had begun earlier that month. In February 2025, it was reported that filming was taking place in Chicago.

== Release ==
The season was released on October 3, 2025, on Netflix.

== Reception ==
=== Audience viewership ===
The season debuted at number two on Netflix's global weekly chart, garnering 12.2 million views (or 90.6 million hours viewed) within three days of its release. It reached the number one spot globally in its second week, with 20.7 million views (154.2 million hours viewed), surpassing The Lyle and Erik Menendez Story's second-week record of 19.5 million views. However, The Ed Gein Story dropped to 9.5 million views (70.5 million hours viewed) in its third week, below The Lyle and Erik Menendez Story's third-week figure of 13.1 million views. It earned 2.8 million views (21.2 million hours viewed) in its fourth week and stayed on Netflix's Top 10 most-watched English-language shows globally for five weeks, shorter than the seven-week runs of both The Lyle and Erik Menendez Story and The Jeffrey Dahmer Story.

=== Critical response ===
The review aggregator website Rotten Tomatoes reported a 22% approval rating, based on 41 critic reviews, with an average rating of 3.9/10. Metacritic, which uses a weighted average, gave a score of 28 out of 100, based on 15 critics, indicating "generally unfavorable" reviews.

In her review for Variety, Aramide Tinubu commends the season for its strong production values, highlighting the "absolutely outstanding performances" of the lead actors and the "classic noir film style" portrayal of 1950s Wisconsin. However, she criticizes the series for its campy tone, excessive graphic violence, and overabundance of subplots, which contribute to a lack of cohesive tone and resolution. Tinubu argues that the show prioritizes Ed Gein's pop culture image over a deeper exploration of his abusive mother–son relationship with Augusta, a theme introduced in the first episode but largely abandoned thereafter. She concludes that this focus "makes Ed Gein mythical again, and in turn strips away the texture and grit that was desperately needed to make the series work."

The Hollywood Reporter's Daniel Fienberg criticized the season as a "tired, overstuffed mess" that squanders Charlie Hunnam's and Laurie Metcalf's performances, while failing to meaningfully engage with the series' meta themes on true crime's cultural legacy. Fienberg questioned the show's decision to depict explicit imagery, noting that it caters to audience demand for "monstrosities" while at the same time mocking their consumption of it. He described the season's narrative as chaotic and its themes as contradictory, lacking the cohesive episodes found in its predecessors such as "The Hurt Man" from Monsters: The Lyle and Erik Menendez Story (2024) and "Silenced" from Dahmer – Monster: The Jeffrey Dahmer Story (2022). Fienberg concluded that the season "feels like Ryan Murphy's anthology has finally run out of gas," prioritizing spectacle over substance in a way that "honors neither the victims nor the monster it claims to dissect."

Writing for The Age, Craig Mathieson described the season as "dreadful in enough ways to be repellent rather than mere trash," criticizing the selection of "the wrong monster" in Ed Gein, who "had little personality, zero purpose, and provided no real illumination on his crimes." He called it a "garish, wildly unfocused, and fundamentally dishonest attempt to make eight episodes of prestige horror." Mathieson criticized Hunnam's "one-note performance as a mewling weirdo with a high-pitched voice," and dismissed the production's inauthentic period detail as "alternately grim and glossy." He further derided the series' sprawling subplots involving figures like Alfred Hitchcock (portrayed "as a peeper like Gein") and Ilse Koch, as well as "ludicrous additions" such as a fictional love interest for Gein and "pointless hallucinations" like him "danc[ing] to a record and flirt[ing] with a corpse," culminating in a "late, heinous effort to fictitiously rehabilitate" Gein by having him aid in capturing Ted Bundy, which Mathieson deemed "the last of too many egregious errors.

In Vulture, Roxana Hadadi wrote, "Monster tiptoes very close to delivering a thought-provoking argument about the way we use entertainment to avoid taking responsibility for our collective sins of complacency and cultural narcissism. Alas. Like Gein, Monster doesn't know when to stop." Hadadi opined that the fourth episode would have been a fair place for the season to conclude. She concluded, "In the season's back half, neither its overloading of vile desecrations nor maudlin sentimentality adds anything that Monster hadn't already established…We already know how the tale of Ed Gein ends, with commercialization and infamy. What Monster fails to consider is that it's part of the problem."

Similarly, Brian Tallerico of RogerEbert.com gave the season 1 and ½ stars out of 4, writing it is ambitious for Murphy and Brennan to explore Ed Gein's influence on pop culture icons like Alfred Hitchcock's Psycho and Tobe Hooper's The Texas Chain Saw Massacre to reflect "our current obsession with extreme violence and stories of true crime". He criticized the series for its unfocused execution, prioritizing grotesque shock value over substantive themes, and described it as "connecting dots with crayons" while lacking depth in addressing the impact of violence.

Tallerico also criticized Hunnam's "distracting and unconvincing" performance as a "soft-spoken simpleton" devoid of humanity, along with factual inaccuracies—such as unsubstantiated depictions of Gein's crimes, including a sexual encounter with victim Bernice Worden—and pointless recreations like a graphic Psycho shower scene, questioning, "What is the point of re-creating such a landscape-shifting moment in culture but doing so with a Netflix 2025 degree of 'adults only' shots? Is it a commentary or just provocation?" He concluded that the series "flirts with interesting themes" but is ultimately "content to wear the skin of projects like those without having any sign of a heartbeat," failing as meaningful commentary on pop culture violence.

Drew Burnett Gregory of Autostraddle criticized the "grossly inaccurate" portrayal of Ed Gein as a crossdresser, which she said to be unsupported by historical evidence. She argued that the series’ depiction of Gein wearing women's clothing and idolizing transgender actress Christine Jorgensen perpetuated harmful stereotypes.

=== Accolades ===
Award	Date of ceremony	Category	Nominee(s)	Result	Ref.
Critics' Choice Awards	January 4, 2026	Best Actor in a Limited Series or Movie Made for Television	Charlie Hunnam	Nominated	
Golden Globe Awards	January 11, 2026	Best Performance by a Male Actor in a Limited Series, Anthology Series, or Motion Picture Made for Television	Charlie Hunnam	Nominated	
Make-Up Artists & Hair Stylists Guild Awards	February 14, 2026	Best Period and/or Character Make-Up (Television Series – Limited or Movie for Television)	Corey Castellano and Heather Koontz	Nominated	
Make-Up Artists & Hair Stylists Guild Awards	February 14, 2026	Best Period and/or Character Hair Styling (Television Series – Limited or Movie for Television)	Barry Lee Moe, Erica Adams, George Guzman, Michele Arvizo, and Randy Wilder	Nominated	
Make-Up Artists & Hair Stylists Guild Awards	February 14, 2026	Best Special Make-Up Prosthetics (Television Series – Limited or Movie for Television)	Corey Castellano, Mark Nieman, David Leroy Anderson, and David Snyder	Nominated	
Art Directors Guild Awards	February 28, 2026	Excellence in Production Design for a Television Movie or Limited Series	Matthew Flood Ferguson	Won	
Actor Awards	March 1, 2026	Outstanding Performance by a Male Actor in a Television Movie or Limited Series	Charlie Hunnam	Nominated	
American Society of Cinematographers Awards	March 8, 2026	Outstanding Achievement in Cinematography in Motion Picture, Limited Series, or Pilot Made for Television	Michael Bauman (for "Buxum Bird")	Nominated	
Satellite Awards	March 8, 2026	Best Actor in a Miniseries, Limited Series, or Motion Picture Made for Television	Charlie Hunnam	Nominated	
Critics' Choice Super Awards	August 6, 2026	Best Actor in a Horror Series, Limited Series, or Made-for-TV Movie	Charlie Hunnam	Nominated	
Critics' Choice Super Awards	August 6, 2026	Best Actress in a Horror Series, Limited Series, or Made-for-TV Movie	Laurie Metcalf	Nominated	
Set Decorators Society of America TV Awards	August 9, 2026	Best Achievement in Décor/Design of a Television Movie or Limited Series	Melissa Licht and Matthew Flood	Nominated	
Primetime Creative Arts Emmy Awards	September 5–6, 2026	Outstanding Supporting Actress in a Limited or Anthology Series or Movie	Laurie Metcalf	Nominated	
Primetime Creative Arts Emmy Awards	September 5–6, 2026	Outstanding Cinematography for a Limited or Anthology Series or Movie	Michael Bauman (for "Buxom Bird")	Nominated	
Primetime Creative Arts Emmy Awards	September 5–6, 2026	Outstanding Period Costumes	Joshua J. Marsh, Sharon Sampson, Erin Fabian, Serrita Coleman, and Latrese Wright (for "Mother!")	Nominated	
Primetime Creative Arts Emmy Awards	September 5–6, 2026	Outstanding Period or Fantasy/Sci-Fi Makeup (Non-Prosthetic)	Heather Koontz (for "The Babysitter")	Nominated	
Primetime Creative Arts Emmy Awards	September 5–6, 2026	Outstanding Prosthetic Makeup	Leo Corey Castellano, Mark Nieman, and Joseph Badiali (for "The Godfather")	Nominated	
Primetime Creative Arts Emmy Awards	September 5–6, 2026	Outstanding Sound Mixing for a Limited or Anthology Series or Movie	Jamie Hardt, Christina "Chuyue" Wen, Jose Garcia, Mario M. Coletta, Jamison Rabbe, and Jacob McNaughton (for "Sick as Your Secrets")	Nominated	
MacGuffin Awards	September 12, 2026	One Hour Period Television Series	Cameron Lowande	Nominated	
Primetime Emmy Awards	September 14, 2026	Outstanding Lead Actor in a Limited or Anthology Series or Movie	Charlie Hunnam	Nominated	
