= Monster (American TV series) =

American anthology television series

- Also known as: Monster: The Jeffrey Dahmer Story or Dahmer – Monster: The Jeffrey Dahmer Story (season 1); Monsters: The Lyle and Erik Menendez Story (season 2); Monster: The Ed Gein Story (season 3); Monster: The Lizzie Borden Story (season 4)
- Genre: Biographical; Crime drama; Anthology; Thriller; Horror
- Created by: Ryan Murphy (s. 1–2); Ian Brennan
- Showrunners: Ryan Murphy; Ian Brennan
- Written by: Ian Brennan; Various
- Directed by: Various
- Music by: Nick Cave; Warren Ellis; Thomas Newman; Julia Newman; Mac Quayle; Bryce Dessner
- Country of origin: United States
- Original language: English (Note: With some dialogue in Lao and American Sign Language in the first season, as well as Spanish in the second season, German in the third season, and Hungarian in the fourth season.)
- No. of seasons: 4
- No. of episodes: 35

Production
- Executive producers: Ryan Murphy; Ian Brennan; Janet Mock; Carl Franklin; Alexis Martin Woodall; Eric Kovtun; Evan Peters; Scott Robertson; David McMillan; Louise Shore; Javier Bardem; Charlie Hunnam; Max Winkler; Eric Kovtun; Scott Robertson; Nissa Diederich; Louise Shore
- Producers: Mathew Hart; Todd Kubrak; Reilly Smith; Lou Eyrich; Rashad Robinson; Richard Jenkins; Peggy Tachdjian; Danielle Wang; Bonnie Muñoz
- Production locations: Los Angeles, California; Chicago, Illinois
- Cinematography: Jason McCormick; Baz Idoine; Michael Bauman; Carolina Costa
- Editors: Stephanie Filo; Taylor Joy Mason; Peggy Tachdjian; Franzis Müller; Julia Franklin; Adam Penn
- Running time: 36–65 minutes
- Production companies: Prospect Films; Ryan Murphy Television

Original release
- Network: Netflix
- Release: September 21, 2022 – present

Monster (Note: Prior to its renewal, the series was known as Monster: The Jeffrey Dahmer Story for its first season.) is an American biographical crime drama anthology television series created by Ryan Murphy and Ian Brennan for Netflix. The series dramatizes high-profile homicide cases in American history, with each season focusing on a different killer. Murphy and Brennan both serve as showrunners. Initially conceived as a limited series, the show was later renewed as an anthology after the success of its first season, The Jeffrey Dahmer Story, which premiered on September 21, 2022. It was followed by The Lyle and Erik Menendez Story in 2024, The Ed Gein Story in 2025, and The Lizzie Borden Story in 2026.

The series has received mixed critical reception and generated controversy throughout its first four seasons, particularly over its historical inaccuracies and the ethics of dramatizing true crime. Despite this, it has achieved worldwide commercial success and received numerous wins and nominations at major award ceremonies, including the Primetime Emmy Awards, the Golden Globe Awards, the Actor Awards, the Critics' Choice Awards, and the BAFTA Television Awards.

== Premise ==
The anthology series dramatizes high-profile homicide cases in American history, with each season focusing on a different killer, exploring the crimes, investigations, and impact on victims and communities. The anthology presents events through a dramatized narrative format.

== Cast and characters ==
=== The Jeffrey Dahmer Story ===
- Evan Peters as Jeffrey Dahmer
- Richard Jenkins as Lionel Dahmer
- Molly Ringwald as Shari Dahmer
- Niecy Nash as Glenda Cleveland
- Michael Learned as Catherine Dahmer

=== The Lyle and Erik Menendez Story ===
- Javier Bardem as José Menendez
- Chloë Sevigny as Kitty Menendez
- Cooper Koch as Erik Menendez
- Nicholas Alexander Chavez as Lyle Menendez
- Ari Graynor as Leslie Abramson
- Nathan Lane as Dominick Dunne

=== The Ed Gein Story ===
- Charlie Hunnam as Ed Gein
- Suzanna Son as Adeline Watkins
- Vicky Krieps as Ilse Koch
- Laurie Metcalf as Augusta Gein
- Tom Hollander as Alfred Hitchcock

=== The Lizzie Borden Story ===
- Ella Beatty as Lizzie Borden
- Vicky Krieps as:
  - Bridget Sullivan
  - Elizabeth Báthory
- Charlie Hunnam as Andrew Borden
- Rebecca Hall as Abby Borden

== Episodes ==
Season	Title	Episodes	Originally released
1	The Jeffrey Dahmer Story	10	September 21, 2022
2	The Lyle and Erik Menendez Story	9	September 19, 2024
3	The Ed Gein Story	8	October 3, 2025
4	The Lizzie Borden Story	8	September 17, 2026

=== Season 1: The Jeffrey Dahmer Story (2022) ===
No. overall	No. in season	Title	Directed by	Written by	Original release date
1	1	"Bad Meat"	Carl Franklin	Ryan Murphy & Ian Brennan	September 21, 2022
2	2	"Please Don't Go"	Clement Virgo	Ryan Murphy & Ian Brennan	September 21, 2022
3	3	"Doin' a Dahmer"	Clement Virgo	Ryan Murphy & Ian Brennan	September 21, 2022
4	4	"The Good Boy Box"	Jennifer Lynch	Ryan Murphy & Ian Brennan	September 21, 2022
5	5	"Blood on Their Hands"	Jennifer Lynch	Ian Brennan	September 21, 2022
6	6	"Silenced"	Paris Barclay	David McMillan & Janet Mock	September 21, 2022
7	7	"Cassandra"	Jennifer Lynch	Ian Brennan & Janet Mock & David McMillan	September 21, 2022
8	8	"Lionel"	Gregg Araki	Ian Brennan & David McMillan	September 21, 2022
9	9	"The Bogeyman"	Jennifer Lynch	Ian Brennan & David McMillan & Reilly Smith	September 21, 2022
10	10	"God of Forgiveness, God of Vengeance"	Paris Barclay	Ian Brennan & David McMillan & Reilly Smith & Todd Kubrak	September 21, 2022

=== Season 2: The Lyle and Erik Menendez Story (2024) ===
No. overall	No. in season	Title	Directed by	Written by	Original release date
11	1	"Blame It on the Rain"	Carl Franklin	Ryan Murphy & Ian Brennan	September 19, 2024
12	2	"Spree"	Carl Franklin	Ian Brennan & David McMillan	September 19, 2024
13	3	"Brother, Can You Spare a Dime?"	Paris Barclay	Ian Brennan & David McMillan	September 19, 2024
14	4	"Kill or Be Killed"	Paris Barclay	Ian Brennan & David McMillan	September 19, 2024
15	5	"The Hurt Man"	Michael Uppendahl	Ian Brennan	September 19, 2024
16	6	"Don't Dream It's Over"	Max Winkler	Ryan Murphy & Ian Brennan	September 19, 2024
17	7	"Showtime"	Michael Uppendahl	David McMillan & Reilly Smith & Todd Kubrak	September 19, 2024
18	8	"Seismic Shifts"	Ian Brennan	Ian Brennan	September 19, 2024
19	9	"Hang Men"	Michael Uppendahl	David McMillan & Reilly Smith & Todd Kubrak & Ian Brennan	September 19, 2024

=== Season 3: The Ed Gein Story (2025) ===
No. overall	No. in season	Title	Directed by	Written by	Original release date
20	1	"Mother!"	Max Winkler	Ian Brennan	October 3, 2025
21	2	"Sick as Your Secrets"	Max Winkler	Ian Brennan	October 3, 2025
22	3	"The Babysitter"	Max Winkler	Ian Brennan	October 3, 2025
23	4	"Green"	Ian Brennan	Ian Brennan	October 3, 2025
24	5	"Ice"	Ian Brennan	Ian Brennan	October 3, 2025
25	6	"Buxom Bird"	Max Winkler	Ian Brennan	October 3, 2025
26	7	"Ham Radio"	Max Winkler	Ian Brennan	October 3, 2025
27	8	"The Godfather"	Max Winkler	Ian Brennan	October 3, 2025

=== Season 4: The Lizzie Borden Story (2026) ===
No. overall	No. in season	Title	Directed by	Written by	Original release date
28	1	"Bloodbath"	Max Winkler	Ian Brennan	September 17, 2026
29	2	"Strong Kitty"	Max Winkler	Ian Brennan	September 17, 2026
30	3	"Whack Job!"	Max Winkler	Ian Brennan	September 17, 2026
31	4	"R.I.P (Rest in Pestilence) Abby Borden"	Sarah Adina Smith	Ian Brennan	September 17, 2026
32	5	"41"	Max Winkler	Ian Brennan	September 17, 2026
33	6	"Bed and Breakfast"	Sarah Adina Smith	Ian Brennan	September 17, 2026
34	7	"The Trial of the Century"	Max Winkler	Ian Brennan	September 17, 2026
35	8	"Carnival"	Max Winkler	Ian Brennan	September 17, 2026

== Production ==
=== Development ===
In 2018, co-creator and co-showrunner Ryan Murphy signed a deal with Netflix for $300 million to create original television shows. On October 2, 2020, a limited series focusing on the life of serial killer Jeffrey Dahmer was announced to have been greenlit from Murphy and co-creator Ian Brennan, titled Monster: The Jeffrey Dahmer Story. To prepare for the role, Dahmer actor Evan Peters reportedly "stayed in ... character ... for months."

On November 7, 2022, Netflix announced that the series had been renewed as an anthology series based on famous convicted killers who are "monstrous figures". The series had a two-season order, and was renamed simply to Monster. On May 1, 2023, Netflix announced that the second season would center on the murder case of the Menendez brothers, and be titled Monsters: The Lyle and Erik Menendez Story.

On September 16, 2024, it was announced that the third season of Monster will focus on convicted murderer and suspected serial killer Ed Gein. On October 4, it was confirmed that the season would be titled The Original Monster, exploring Ed Gein's life as the first "celebrity serial killer" and examining how true crime evolved into a pop culture phenomenon. Principal photography reportedly began the next month. The season was announced to be retitled to Monster: The Ed Gein Story in August 2025.

On July 28, 2025, it was announced that the fourth season of Monster will focus on murder suspect Lizzie Borden, who was tried and acquitted of the 1892 axe murders of her father and stepmother.

=== Casting ===
On October 2, 2020, Richard Jenkins was announced to be starring in the first season as Lionel Dahmer. On March 31, 2021, Michael Learned, Peters, Penelope Ann Miller and Niecy Nash were all announced to be joining the series as Catherine Dahmer, Jeffrey Dahmer, Joyce Dahmer and Glenda Cleveland, respectively. Shaun J. Brown and Colin Ford were announced to have been cast in undisclosed roles.

On June 29, 2023, Deadline reported that Cooper Koch and Nicholas Alexander Chavez were cast as Erik and Lyle Menendez, respectively, for the second season. On January 15, 2024, it was announced that Javier Bardem and Chloë Sevigny had joined the cast as José and Kitty, respectively. That same day, Nathan Lane was cast as Dominick Dunne. On February 1, 2024, Ari Graynor joined as Leslie Abramson. Leslie Grossman was added that same month as Judalon Smyth.

On September 16, 2024, it was announced that Charlie Hunnam had been cast as Gein for the third season. Gein had previously been portrayed by Shane Kerwin in the first season. On October 15, it was announced that Laurie Metcalf, Tom Hollander and Olivia Williams had joined the cast, as Augusta Gein, Alfred Hitchcock and Alma Reville respectively. On February 18, 2025, it was announced that Suzanna Son had joined the cast as Adeline Watkins. On July 8, Addison Rae was reported to have been cast as Evelyn Hartley.

On July 28, 2025, it was announced that Ella Beatty had been cast as Borden for the fourth season. Rebecca Hall and Vicky Krieps were also cast as Borden's stepmother Abby Borden and maid Bridget Sullivan, respectively. On September 14, Hunnam confirmed that he is currently in negotiations to star as Lizzie's father Andrew Borden in the season. On September 17, it was announced that Billie Lourd and Jessica Barden joined the series as Lizzie's older sister Emma Borden and Nance O'Neil, respectively. It was also reported that Sarah Paulson was in final talks to play Aileen Wuornos.

=== Filming ===
Principal photography for the first season took place in Los Angeles, California, as well as in San Pedro and Altadena.

Production for the second season was initially set for September 2023, but was postponed due to the SAG-AFTRA and WAG strikes. Principal photography commenced in January 2024 and wrapped in July 2024, also in Los Angeles.

On October 5, 2024, it was reported that principal photography for the third season was scheduled to begin on October 31. On November 23, it was reported that filming had begun earlier that month.

Principal photography for the fourth season began in Los Angeles in September 2025 and wrapped in March 2026.

=== Soundtrack ===
The soundtrack for the first season was composed and performed by Nick Cave and Warren Ellis. The soundtrack album was released the same day as the series. Julia and Thomas Newman composed the soundtrack for the second season. The official soundtrack album was released on various streaming platforms on September 13, 2024, prior to the release of the season.

== Release ==
The first season, Monster: The Jeffrey Dahmer Story, was released on September 21, 2022. The second season, Monsters: The Lyle and Erik Menendez Story, was released on September 19, 2024. The third season, Monster: The Ed Gein Story, was released on October 3, 2025. The fourth season, The Lizzie Borden Story, was released on September 17, 2026.

== Reception ==
=== Audience viewership ===
According to Netflix, the Monster anthology series had accumulated nearly 170 million views across all seasons as of September 22, 2026.

The first season rose to the number one spot on Netflix in the first week of its release for the first season. In the second week of its release, Netflix announced that Dahmer was its ninth most popular English-language TV show of all time, with 56 million households having viewed all 10 episodes. The season remained number-one for weeks and became Netflix's second most-viewed English Netflix series of all time, and the fourth highest across any language with 701.37 million hours viewed in 21 days. In 60 days it became the third Netflix series to pass 1 billion views. Dahmer debuted at number-one on the Nielsen Top 10 streaming chart by garnering more than 3.6 billion minutes of viewing for the week of September 19–25, placing it 10th on the all-time list for single-week viewership. The following week, it jumped to No. 7 on the all-time list with 4.4 billion minutes viewed. The season topped Nielsen's streaming chart for the third consecutive week with 2.3 billion viewing minutes.

Under Netflix's new streaming metrics, the second season debuted at the number-one spot on the platform globally, garnering 12.3 million views (or 97.5 million hours viewed) within just four days of its release. On its second week, it remained the most-watched series on Netflix after earning 19.5 million views (or 153.8 million hours viewed). It received 13.1 million views (or 103.6 million hours viewed) on its third week and 8.7 million views (or 68.6 million hours viewed) on its fourth week. On the Nielsen Streaming Chart, it debuted as the top one streaming content (both for films and television series) with 1.72 billion minutes watched, and had a 40% rise on its second week with 2.4 billion minutes watched, the highest since Bridgerton in June 2024.

The third season debuted at number two on Netflix's global weekly chart, garnering 12.2 million views (or 90.6 million hours viewed) within three days of its release. It reached the number one spot globally in its second week, with 20.7 million views (154.2 million hours viewed), surpassing The Lyle and Erik Menendez Story's second-week record of 19.5 million views. However, The Ed Gein Story dropped to 9.5 million views (70.5 million hours viewed) in its third week, below The Lyle and Erik Menendez Story's third-week figure of 13.1 million views. It earned 2.8 million views (21.2 million hours viewed) in its fourth week and stayed on Netflix's Top 10 most-watched English-language shows globally for five weeks, shorter than the seven-week runs of both The Lyle and Erik Menendez Story and The Jeffrey Dahmer Story.

The Lizzie Borden Story became the third season of the anthology series to debut at number one on Netflix's global weekly chart, with 12.1 million views (or 80.1 million hours viewed) within four days of its release, although it was the lowest debut in the anthology. It garnered 14.5 million views (or 95.9 million hours viewed) in its second week, representing a 20% increase in viewership from the previous week, but remaining below the second-week viewership of its predecessors.

=== Critical response ===
The review aggregator website Rotten Tomatoes reported a 57% approval rating for the first season, with an average rating of 6.3/10, based on 30 critic reviews. The website's critics consensus says: "While Monster is seemingly self-aware of the peril in glorifying Jeffrey Dahmer, creator Ryan Murphy's salacious style nevertheless tilts this horror story into the realm of queasy exploitation." Metacritic, which uses a weighted average, assigned a score of 46 out of 100 based on 9 critics, indicating "mixed or average reviews".

For the second season, Rotten Tomatoes reported a 47% approval rating, with an average rating of 5.0/10, based on 30 critic reviews. The website's consensus says: "Well-acted but off-puttingly sordid, Monsters leaves viewers feeling guilty without enough pleasure to compensate." Metacritic assigned a score of 47 out of 100 based on 12 critics, indicating "mixed or average" reviews. Critics praised the performances (particularly those of Cooper Koch and Javier Bardem) and the one-shot episode "The Hurt Man", but criticized the season's inconsistent tone, runtime, and excessive sexual content, including homoerotic themes and the portrayal of an incestuous relationship between the brothers.

The third season holds a 22% approval rating on Rotten Tomatoes, based on 41 critic reviews. Metacritic assigned a score of 28 out of 100 based on 15 critics, indicating "generally unfavorable" reviews. The season was criticized for its subplots, runtime, graphic violence, and factual inaccuracies, as well as its meta commentary on the cultural obsession with true crime, which critics deemed to be "hypocritical".

Rotten Tomatoes reported a 37% approval rating on the fourth season, based on 30 critic reviews, with an average rating of 5.0/10. Metacritic, which uses a weighted average, gave a score of 47 out of 100, based on 15 critics, indicating "mixed or average" reviews. Critics primarily praised the performances and production design but criticized its historical liberties and fictionalized portrayal of Borden and other historical figures.

=== Accolades ===
Monster has won 16 awards out of its 93 award nominations. The anthology series has garnered 30 Primetime Emmy Award nominations (including Creative Arts nominations), with Niecy Nash of The Jeffrey Dahmer Story winning for Outstanding Supporting Actress in a Limited or Anthology Series or Movie and Peggy Tachdjian of The Lyle and Erik Menendez Story winning for Outstanding Picture Editing for a Limited or Anthology Series or Movie. It has received eight Golden Globe Award nominations, with Evan Peters winning for Best Actor – Miniseries or Television Film for his performance as Jeffrey Dahmer. Peters has also won the Satellite Award for Best Actor – Miniseries or Television Film and the Astra TV Award for Best Actor in a Streaming Limited or Anthology Series or Movie. At the British Academy Television Awards, the first season won Best International Programme.

=== Controversies ===
The series generated public debate regarding the ethics of dramatizing real-life crimes. Some family members of victims expressed concerns about the portrayal of traumatic events and the use of creative liberties. Media outlets including Time covered discussions surrounding the broader cultural impact of true crime adaptations.

On September 23, 2022, Netflix removed the first season's "LGBTQ" tag following backlash on social media. The season also received criticism from the families of Dahmer's victims, accusing Netflix of profiting off their traumatic experiences and "retraumatizing [the families] all over again". Production assistant Kim Alsup alleged racial mistreatment while on set.

Initially, Erik Menendez issued a statement denouncing the second season, claiming, "I believed we had moved beyond the lies and ruinous character portrayals of Lyle, creating a caricature of Lyle rooted in horrible and blatant lies rampant in the show." Menendez called the portrayal of him and Lyle as "disheartening slander". He also called out the series' creator and co-writer Ryan Murphy, stating, "[he] cannot be this naive and inaccurate about the facts of our lives so as to do this without bad intent." However, a few months later, the brothers expressed gratitude for how it brought attention to their case and the childhood trauma they endured. Lyle Menendez stated that the series "opened a lot of people's eyes", and both brothers acknowledged that it helped shift public understanding of their story. Lyle also defined Cooper Koch's performance as "pretty extraordinary".

The second season also received backlash for its incestuous depiction of the Menendez brothers. Viewers have also accused it of sensationalizing the brothers' abuse and turning it into a "fictitious incestuous relationship." Trial expert and journalist Robert Rand, author of The Menendez Murders, labeled the incest allegations as "fantasy" and pointed out that there was no credible evidence to support such claims. He explained that while some rumors circulated during the trial, they were baseless, and the series distorted the brothers' relationship for dramatic effect.

== See also ==
- American Crime Story, a true crime anthology series executive produced by Ryan Murphy for FX.
