= The Hurt Man =

- Monster episode
- Episode no.: Season 2 Episode 5
- Directed by: Michael Uppendahl
- Written by: Ian Brennan
- Cinematography by: Jason McCormick
- Editing by: Franzis Müller
- Original release date: September 19, 2024
- Running time: 34 minutes

Episode chronology
| ← Previous "Kill or Be Killed" | Next → "Don't Dream It's Over" |

"The Hurt Man" is the fifth episode of Monsters: The Lyle and Erik Menendez Story, the second season of the American biographical crime drama anthology television series Monster, created by Ryan Murphy and Ian Brennan for Netflix. Directed by Michael Uppendahl and written by Brennan, the episode was released on Netflix on September 19, 2024.

The season dramatizes the murder case of brothers Lyle and Erik Menendez, convicted of the 1989 murders of their parents in Beverly Hills. A two-hander bottle episode filmed in a single continuous take (or "oner"), "The Hurt Man" stars Cooper Koch as Erik Menendez, who recounts his childhood abuse in a conversation with his attorney, Leslie Abramson (Ari Graynor). This marks Koch as the only cast member to appear in every episode of the season.

The episode received critical acclaim for its acting, direction, writing, and emotional intensity, with some critics regarding it as a standout of the season and one of Murphy's strongest works. The Menendez brothers praised Koch's performance in the episode.

== Plot ==
In a jail interview room, Erik Menendez (Cooper Koch) speaks with his defense attorney, Leslie Abramson (Ari Graynor), about the sexual, physical, and emotional abuse he allegedly suffered from his father, José Menendez. Erik describes the abuse that began in early childhood and continued into his late teens, as well as the complicity of his mother, Kitty Menendez, who he claims enabled it. He also claims that his confusion about his sexuality stems from the abuse he experienced. He refers to himself as "the Hurt Man", a childhood nickname reflecting his sense of permanent brokenness and lack of self-identity.

Leslie, primarily seen from behind, listens compassionately, occasionally asking questions to affirm Erik's lack of blame.

== Production ==
=== Writing and development ===
The episode was written by series co-creator Ian Brennan and directed by Michael Uppendahl. According to co-creator Ryan Murphy, it was not initially planned as a one-shot episode, but during the writing process, he realized that "the most powerful way to do it would be [...] in one shot so that [viewers] could not look away", as his goal was "to give Erik Menendez his day in court, to talk about what had happened to him uninterrupted, with no bias". He stated that the dialogue was based on Erik's documented statements, transcripts, and writings to maintain authenticity.

Three days prior to the 2023 Writers Guild of America strike, Brennan completed the 34-page screenplay in one sitting for three hours. Koch received the screenplay in June that year, nine months before they filmed the episode in March 2024. He stated, "The script became the backbone of my [preparation for the role] because it was the backstory that I didn't have to write for myself, for the character." Brennan shared the full screenplay to Deadline in June 2025.

=== Filming ===
Uppendahl opted minimal rehearsal to preserve authenticity, with Koch and Graynor only rehearsing once on set before filming. Cinematographer Jason McCormick began with a static shot and gradually zoomed in on Koch's face, while Graynor's face remained unseen as she slowly disappeared from the shot. A total of eight takes were filmed over two days; the eighth and final take was selected for the final broadcast. Koch described the process as emotionally draining and "super nerve-wracking," citing that his performance in the first two takes felt dry due to his nervousness around Murphy.

== Reception ==
=== Critical response ===
In his review for Vanity Fair, Richard Lawson praised the episode, calling it “a formal wonder, bold in its simplicity”. He commended Cooper Koch's performance to be "[blazing] with ache and fury, wholly selling a story of how trauma has unmoored one young man from both himself and reality". However, Lawson critiques the season's overall inconsistency, observing that while "The Hurt Man" evokes empathy, subsequent episodes cast doubt on Erik's credibility and portray the brothers more cynically. This tonal shift, according to Lawson, undermines the impact of the episode and makes it disconnected from the rest of the series.

The New Yorker's Inkoo Kang commended "The Hurt Man" as "some of Murphy's most moving and startling work in ages". Aramide Tinubu of Variety and Daniel Feinberg of The Hollywood Reporter similarly praised the episode as a standout, highlighting Brennan's writing and Koch's performance.

The episode was ranked among IndieWire's "32 Best Television Episodes of 2024". Writer Proma Khosla described it as "an impressive confluence of writing, directing, and performance encased within the wider noise of the season," adding that "maybe, if only for one episode, the series serves [Erik Menendez] well."

=== Response from Lyle and Erik Menendez ===
Despite their public criticism of the series, Lyle and Erik Menendez expressed positive reactions to Koch's performance in the episode. Erik, who met Koch during a prison visit facilitated by Kim Kardashian, told the actor he intended to watch the episode despite finding its subject matter difficult. Erik added, "I've heard nothing but great things about [Koch] and about Episode 5, and that [he's] going to win an Emmy. And I hope that [he does]." Lyle similarly told Koch that he was “very moved” and felt Koch captured Erik's presence.
