= Monsters: The Lyle and Erik Menendez Story =

- Promotional release poster
- Showrunners: Ryan Murphy; Ian Brennan
- Starring: Javier Bardem; Chloë Sevigny; Cooper Koch; Nicholas Alexander Chavez; Ari Graynor; Nathan Lane
- No. of episodes: 9

Release
- Original network: Netflix
- Original release: September 19, 2024

Season chronology
- ← Previous; The Jeffrey Dahmer Story Next → The Ed Gein Story

Monsters: The Lyle and Erik Menendez Story is the second season of the American biographical crime drama anthology television series Monster, created by Ryan Murphy and Ian Brennan for Netflix. The season centers on the 1989 parricides of film executive José Menendez (Javier Bardem) and his wife Kitty (Chloë Sevigny) by their sons, Lyle (Nicholas Alexander Chavez) and Erik (Cooper Koch). The Rashomon effect, a narrative technique in which multiple characters recount contradictory versions of the same events, is used to allow viewers to determine which perspective, if any, is accurate.

It is the second installment in the Monster anthology series, following Dahmer – Monster: The Jeffrey Dahmer Story. Having initially ordered the program in 2020 as a limited series, Netflix announced in 2022 that it had been renewed as an anthology series, with two further editions based on the lives of "other monstrous figures who have impacted society". The second season, which focuses on the Menendez brothers, was announced to be in development on May 1, 2023. Following delays caused by the 2023 Hollywood labor disputes, principal photography took place from January to July 2024.

Upon its premiere on September 19, 2024, the season received mixed reviews from critics, who praised the performances (particularly those of Koch and Bardem) and the one-shot episode "The Hurt Man", but criticized its inconsistent tone, pacing, runtime, and explicit sexual content, including nudity and homoerotic themes. It was also criticized by the real Erik Menendez for its alleged factual inaccuracies and portrayal of Lyle Menendez, although Lyle later expressed gratitude for its depiction of child abuse. It further generated controversy for implying an incestuous relationship between the brothers. Despite the controversies, the season achieved global commercial success, debuting as the number-one series on Netflix worldwide, the most-viewed streaming content on the Nielsen Streaming Chart, and the third most-watched Netflix series in the second half of 2024. At the 77th Primetime Emmy Awards, it earned 11 nominations, including Outstanding Limited or Anthology Series and Outstanding Lead Actor in a Limited or Anthology Series or Movie for Koch, and won for Outstanding Picture Editing for a Limited or Anthology Series or Movie. It also received three nominations at the 82nd Golden Globe Awards, including Best Limited or Anthology Series or Television Film.

A third season, titled Monster: The Ed Gein Story, was released on October 3, 2025, starring Charlie Hunnam as murderer and graverobber Ed Gein.

== Synopsis ==
On August 20, 1989, in Beverly Hills, brothers Lyle and Erik Menendez killed their wealthy parents, José and Kitty Menendez. While the prosecution argued they were seeking to inherit their family fortune, the brothers claimed that their actions stemmed out of fear from a lifetime of sexual, physical, and emotional abuse.

== Cast and characters ==
=== Main ===
- Javier Bardem as José Menendez:
  Lyle and Erik's father. Born in Cuba, he was a wealthy and powerful businessman in the entertainment industry, having served as an executive at RCA Records and the CEO of Live Entertainment. In the series, he is portrayed as an ambitious and controlling father who imposes high expectations on his sons. Lyle and Erik allege that they killed José in self-defense after years of sexual, physical, and emotional abuse. This marks the first series regular role for Bardem, who has primarily worked in major films. He described José as "this commanding man [who] really thinks and feels that he's absolutely right all the time, and that has to be obeyed by others". In an interview with TheWrap, Bardem admitted that he was initially unfamiliar with the case but, after "digging in and informing [himself]", was alarmed by the extent of the alleged sexual abuse. Bardem also serves as an executive producer.
- Chloë Sevigny as Mary Louise "Kitty" Menendez:
  Lyle and Erik's mother. In the series, she is portrayed as struggling with mental health issues, including depression, alcoholism, and substance abuse. Lyle and Erik allege that Kitty was complicit in the abuse they suffered at the hands of their father. In describing her character, Sevigny expressed doubt about whether Kitty intentionally ignored José's alleged sexual abuse of the brothers. She reached out to a film director whose wife had been friends with Kitty, stating, "I'm trying to get in touch with her to hear her personal accounts, which I generally don't like to do, but there's so much negative stuff about Kitty that I feel like it could be really beneficial to hear from someone that did know her."
- Cooper Koch as Erik Menendez:
  The younger Menendez brother, who, along with his older brother Lyle, killed their parents in 1989. An 18-year-old tennis prodigy, Erik is portrayed as the more sensitive brother grappling with guilt and emotional trauma. Koch previously auditioned for the role of Erik in the NBC limited series Law & Order True Crime: The Menendez Murders and the Lifetime television film Menendez: Blood Brothers (both 2017). Prior to the season's premiere, Koch spoke with Lyle and Erik by phone and later met with them at Richard J. Donovan Correctional Facility as part of Kim Kardashian's project on prison reform. Discussing his approach to the role, Koch explained, "I just really wanted to do as much research and dig really deep into myself to really portray [Erik] with integrity and just be as authentic as possible to support him, and also to support his family and all the people who stand with him." He has publicly advocated for their release and remains in contact with both brothers.
- Nicholas Alexander Chavez as Lyle Menendez:
  The older Menendez brother, who, along with his younger brother Erik, killed their parents in 1989. A 21-year-old aspiring businessman and Princeton University student, Lyle is portrayed as the more confident and aggressive brother who is protective of Erik. Chavez revealed that he had no prior knowledge about the case before auditioning for the role. In preparation, he said he "had to do an extensive amount of research" and described Lyle as a "compelling and complicated character". Chavez declined to meet Lyle in prison, stating that it was his way of moving on from the character.
- Ari Graynor as Leslie Abramson:
  Erik's lead defense attorney. A notable criminal defense lawyer in Los Angeles, she is known for her tenacious and aggressive courtroom style. Graynor described Abramson as "an extraordinary lawyer, but she was an extraordinary person, and such a spirit, and fierce and loving." She revealed that she did not reach out to Abramson while preparing for the role, knowing that the now-retired attorney "had made it pretty clear that she never wanted to speak about any of her cases".
- Nathan Lane as Dominick Dunne:
  A prominent journalist known for his keen interest in high-profile criminal cases. Dunne was a key voice in shaping public perception of the brothers' story through his article The Nightmare on Elm Drive for Vanity Fair. In the series, he is portrayed as holding resentment toward defense attorneys and murderers following the death of his daughter, Dominique Dunne, and the subsequent acquittal of her ex-boyfriend and killer. Lane described Dunne as "a passionate advocate for victims and [that's] why he's looking out for José and Kitty". He approached Dunne's son, actor and film director Griffin Dunne, who offered his perspective on the trial of John Sweeney for the murder of his sister.

=== Recurring ===
- Dallas Roberts as Jerome Oziel, Erik's therapist to whom Erik confesses the murders.
- Jason Butler Harner as Det. Les Zoeller, a Beverly Hills Police detective assigned to investigate the deaths of José and Kitty.
- Leslie Grossman as Judalon Smyth, Dr. Oziel's mistress who becomes entangled in Lyle and Erik's case.
- Marlene Forte as Marta Cano, José's sister.
- Larry Clarke as Brian Andersen, Kitty's brother.
- Charlie Hall as Craig Cignarelli, Erik's best friend who, along with Erik, co-wrote a screenplay about a kid who kills his wealthy parents for the inheritance.

=== Guest ===
- Jeff Perry as Peter Hoffman, an executive at Live Entertainment and José's business acquaintance.
- Jade Pettyjohn as Jamie Pisarcik, Lyle's girlfriend at the time of the murders.
- Tanner Stine as Perry Berman, Lyle and Erik's friend.
- Enrique Murciano as Carlos Baralt, José's brother-in-law and the executor of the Menendez family's estate.
- Anthony Turpel as Donovan Goodreau, Lyle's friend whose driver's license was used to purchase the shotguns.
- Drew Powell as Det. Tom Linehan, a Beverly Hills Police detective and Det. Zoeller's partner.
- Michael Gladis as Tim Rutten, Abramsons husband who is a journalist for the Los Angeles Times.
- Gil Ozeri as Dr. William Vicary, a therapist who examines Erik for the trials.
- Salvator Xuereb as Robert Shapiro, Erik and Lyle's first criminal defense attorney.
- Brandon Santana as Tony, an inmate at LA County Jail who becomes sexually involved with Erik.
- Tessa Auberjonois as Laurel Oziel, Dr. Jerome Oziel's wife.
- Jess Weixler as Jill Lansing, Lyle's lead defense attorney in the first trial.
- Milana Vayntrub as Pam Bozanich, a prosecutor in the first trial.
- Paul Adelstein as David Conn, a prosecutor in the second trial.
- Patrick Breen as a jury alternate who replaces Leigh in the second trial.
- Vicki Lawrence as Leigh, a juror in the second trial.
- Yvonne Miranda as Lisa Darview, a newscaster delivering the final verdict.

== Episodes ==
No. overall	No. in season	Title	Directed by	Written by	Original release date
11	1	"Blame It on the Rain"	Carl Franklin	Ryan Murphy & Ian Brennan	September 19, 2024
In 1989, Lyle and Erik Menendez are taken into custody by the FBI temporarily following the murder of their parents, José and Kitty Menendez, in their Beverly Hills mansion, which they initially blame on the mob. Haunted by nightmares of his parents dying, Erik visits Dr. Jerome Oziel and confesses that he and his brother were the ones who killed his parents and why they chose to do so: his father, José, was controlling and physically abusive while his mother, Kitty, was suicidal and addicted to drugs. Following the confession, Dr. Oziel calls Lyle into his office while calling his mistress, Judalon, to witness the confession. At the office, Lyle denies that they killed his parents and leaves with Erik.
12	2	"Spree"	Carl Franklin	Ian Brennan & David McMillan	September 19, 2024
After killing their parents, Lyle and Erik spend part of the night outside in order to create an alibi. Upon returning, the brothers call the police to report the murder, but the police suspect something is amiss. Some time later, the brothers begin to spend a lot of money on luxury products, although they think that their father disinherited them and that they must find the will before it is read. After the opening of the safe where they thought the will was, one of the family's house staff discovers it and gives it to Lyle, and they realize that their father left them everything. Two months later, the police send a friend of Erik's to elicit a confession without success. Dr. Oziel continues with the brothers in therapy and offers them to be his business partner. After Oziel throws Judalon out of his house, in a fit of rage, she goes to the police station after learning everything about the Menendez case.
13	3	"Brother, Can You Spare a Dime?"	Paris Barclay	Ian Brennan & David McMillan	September 19, 2024
After Judalon reveals to the police about Dr. Oziel's Menendez case tapes, the police go to Oziel's house to confiscate them, where they hear the brothers' confession. Lyle and Erik are then arrested by the police and sent to jail to await trial. The brothers have a hard time adjusting to their new life in jail, although Erik befriends an inmate. The brothers are in denial of the seriousness of the incident and its possible consequences until their lawyer, Robert Shapiro, reveals to them that they face the death penalty. After hearing the information, Erik considers telling the truth about his parents, but Lyle refuses. The guards discover a plan by Lyle to escape with Erik and transfer him to a different cell. After firing Shapiro, the family hires Leslie Abramson as Erik's lawyer. At the behest of Leslie, Erik tells Dr. William Vicary that he was sexually abused by Lyle, which was what José did to him.
14	4	"Kill or Be Killed"	Paris Barclay	Ian Brennan & David McMillan	September 19, 2024
Leslie visits Lyle to get his side of the story, though he refuses to portray his father as a monster, saying that he wanted the best for him despite being so very harsh on him. As Lyle talks, he mentions that he was losing his hair due to the pressure his father had on him to be the best, and that their father saved the brothers from being arrested for burglary. Eventually, Lyle begins to talk about how his father abused him, going from bad to worse, while his mother did nothing to stop him. To normalize what was happening to him, he began abusing Erik. Lyle managed to get his father to stop abusing him, though he went on to abuse Erik. After this, Lyle confronted his father and told Leslie that José planned to kill them. Dominick Dunne, an enemy of Leslie, argues that the brothers are truly evil and do not deserve forgiveness.
15	5	"The Hurt Man"	Michael Uppendahl	Ian Brennan	September 19, 2024
During Leslie's visit to Erik, Erik tells her how his parents suddenly locked him up and how his father abused him. In his opinion, his father only loved Lyle. When José began to abuse him, he felt that it was the only time in which his father really loved him, although, like his brother Lyle, the abuse began from massages to rape, which according to his father was to make him strong, although for him it was torture. His mother was aware of all this and began checking his penis to see if he had contracted AIDS, since he was secretly having sexual relations with a man because of his experiences with his father. Finally, Erik tells Leslie that he has been a broken man ever since.
16	6	"Don't Dream It's Over"	Max Winkler	Ryan Murphy & Ian Brennan	September 19, 2024
When Fidel Castro seizes power in Cuba, a 16-year-old José is forced to migrate to the United States and leave his privileged life behind. In 1962, he meets Kitty and the two passionately fall in love with each other, defying the disapproval of their families by getting married. José eventually becomes successful, but their idyllic home life decays as their two sons grow to be overindulged and José begins to cheat on Kitty, who copes with it through substance abuse. José's ambitions of running for senator are endangered when Lyle and Erik are arrested for burglary, compelling him to discipline and disinherit them, and fix the relationship with his wife. Despite his efforts, Lyle is suspended from Princeton for plagiarism and José is horrified to learn that Erik might be homosexual. The episode also portrays Kitty being aware of José's sexual abuse towards their sons—despite his homophobia—which he normalized due to it having been common in his family.
17	7	"Showtime"	Michael Uppendahl	David McMillan & Reilly Smith & Todd Kubrak	September 19, 2024
Erik and Lyle prepare for the trial. During the prison visits, Lyle unsuccessfully attempts to convince relatives, friends, and his girlfriend to give false witness about José's abuse, if not gaslighting them. Even Jill has trouble believing their story, but Leslie trains Lyle to deliver an emotional testimony. In July 1993, arriving at the trial, Erik and Lyle are met with a crowd of admirers, some of whom have also been attempting to contact them. Leslie presents the brothers before the jury as sexual abuse survivors that killed their parents in self-defense. Lyle's emotionally charged testimony manipulates the jury, which profoundly disturbs Dominick as it parallels how ten years before, his daughter's murderer was given a much lighter sentence by using a troubled past as an excuse. Dining with friends, Dominick discusses many lines of evidence to make the attendees doubt the brothers' account, and insincerely congratulates Leslie for her effectiveness as an attorney. Meanwhile, Lyle has been calling Norma, a purported admirer to whom he confesses all their plans, while she secretly tapes him.
18	8	"Seismic Shifts"	Ian Brennan	Ian Brennan	September 19, 2024
Just as a wave of earthquakes hits California, Judalon testifies about Dr. Oziel's abuse, favoring the jury's view of the brothers even more. However, when Erik testifies, his problems with the microphone, misacted demeanor, and misremembering where they bought the shotguns—which is interpreted as him lying—damage their credibility. Ultimately, the judge declares a mistrial, which Leslie blames on the male jurors being more naturally punitive until a female juror explains that it was mostly due to her being unlikeable to them. Six months later, the tone of the letters has shifted from admiration to hate. Jill furiously reveals to Lyle that Norma has been recording their calls and intends to publish a book. (Note: The Private Diary of Lyle Menendez: In His Own Words! by Norma Novelli, 1995.) With Lyle publicly exposed as a liar, only Erik is allowed to testify on the second trial. Jill abandons the case as the brothers have no money left, but Leslie keeps working for free out of fondness for the brothers. Still, Erik confronts her about her failure to emotionally manipulate the jury. Meanwhile, O. J. Simpson is put next to Erik's cell, and the two begin talking.
19	9	"Hang Men"	Michael Uppendahl	David McMillan & Reilly Smith & Todd Kubrak & Ian Brennan	September 19, 2024
In 1995, O. J. Simpson is declared not guilty, causing public outcry and adding to the tensions that have risen among Erik, Lyle, and Leslie, with the brothers now resorting to blame each other. The new trial has Mr. Conn as the prosecutor, who despite Leslie's constant objections successfully makes a case of the brothers being guilty based on numerous witnesses of their overindulged behavior and disrespect—rather than vulnerability—toward José and Kitty. He also surmises that the evidence for sexual abuse is very scarce, and considers illogical to confess everything to Dr. Oziel except the abuse. He believes the brothers lied about being abused, with the real motive having been money, based on their greed, materialism, and having spent $700,000 in the weeks after the murders. Finally, he condemns Leslie's history of emotionally manipulating juries for money. The jury finds Lyle and Erik guilty of first-degree murder, sentencing them to life imprisonment without parole in separate prisons. In a flashback to the day the family goes sailing, José encourages Kitty to return to journalism while Lyle and Erik discuss their plan.

== Production ==
=== Development ===
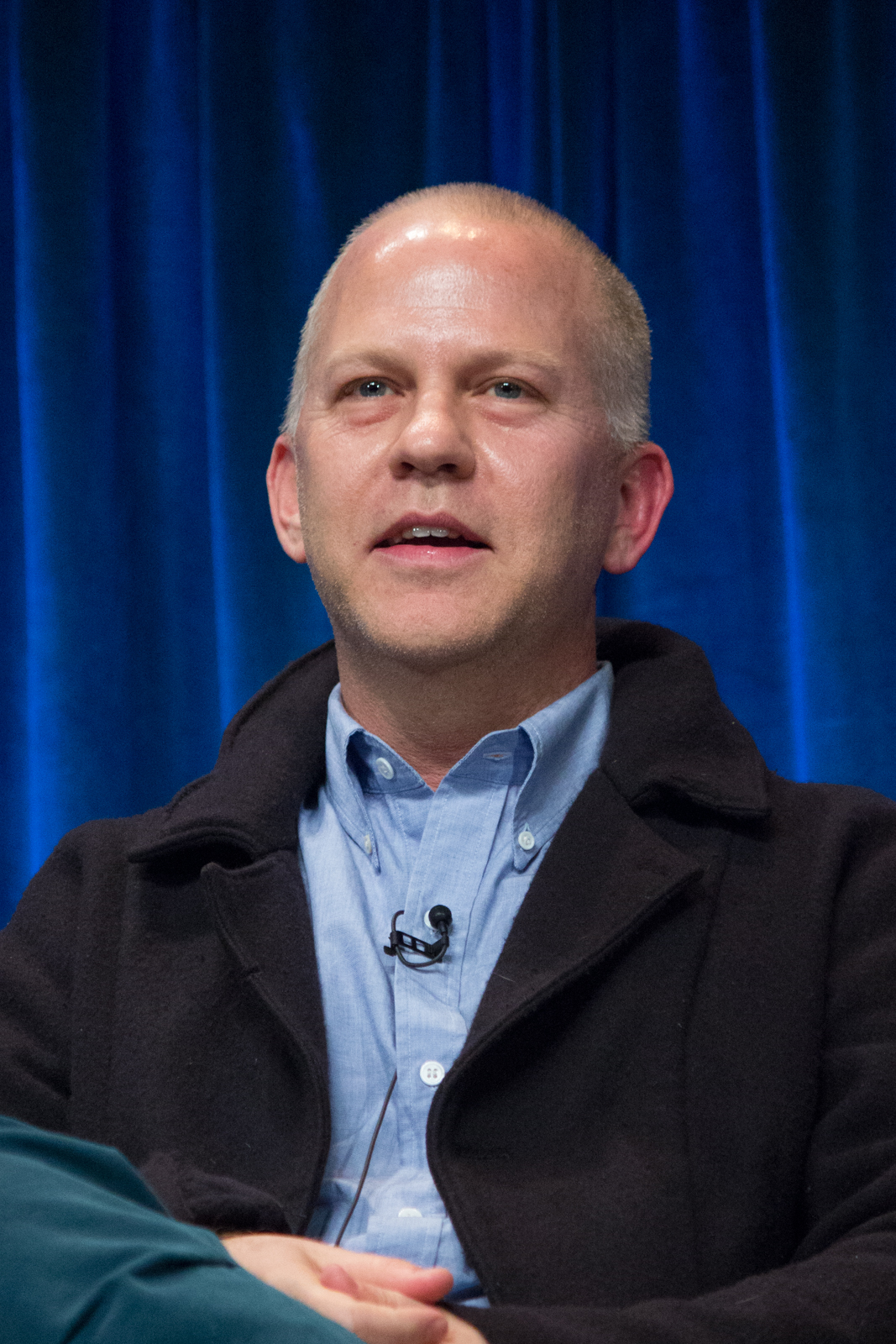
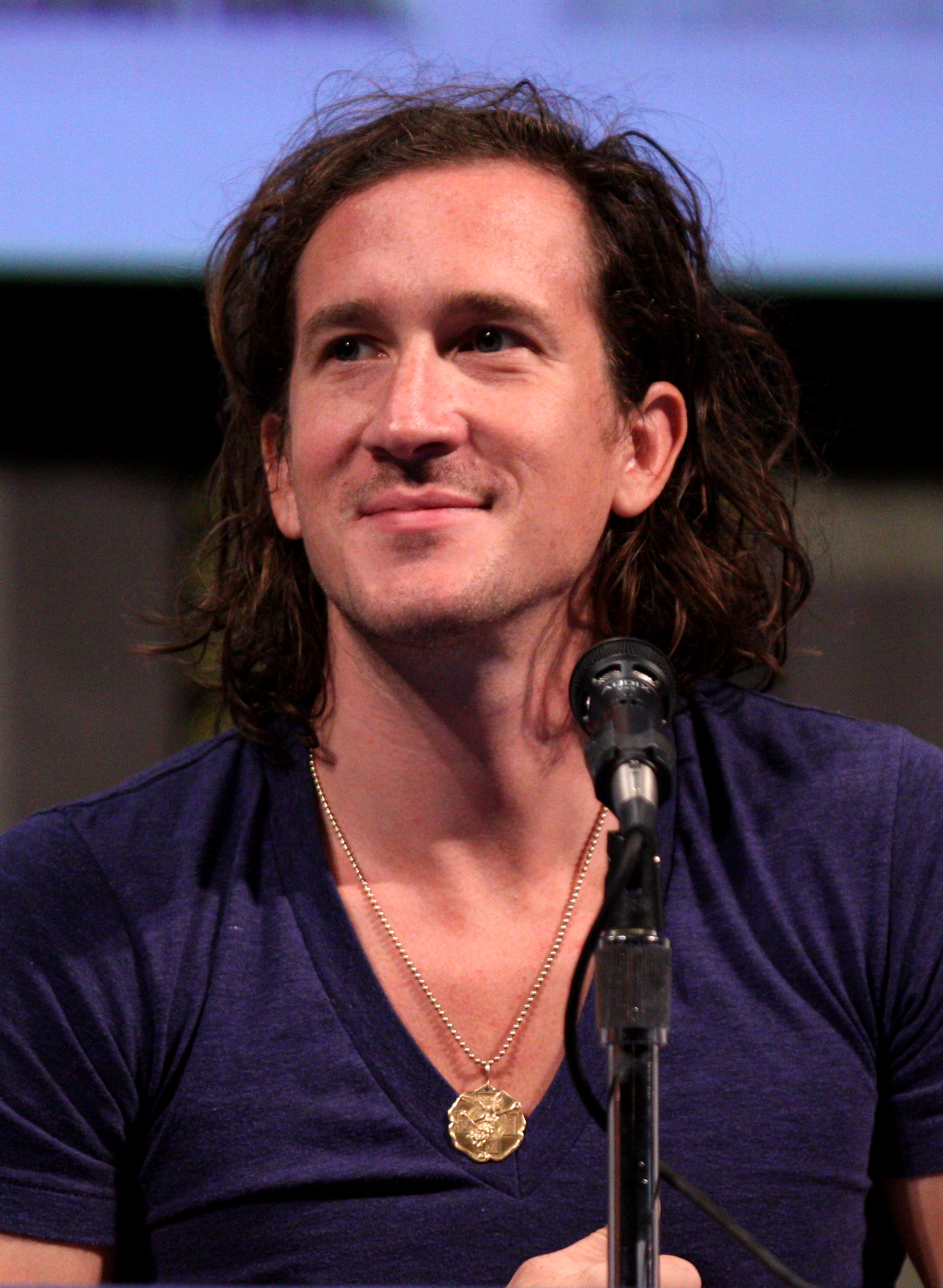
Series co-creators Ryan Murphy (left) and Ian Brennan (right) also served as co-writers; Brennan directed the episode "Seismic Shifts".

Monster was initially ordered as a limited series based on the serial killer Jeffrey Dahmer. On November 7, 2022, Netflix announced that it had been renewed as an anthology series based on famous convicted killers. On May 1, 2023, it was confirmed the second season, titled Monsters, would focus on Lyle and Erik Menendez, brothers convicted of the 1989 murders of their parents in Beverly Hills, California. Creators Ryan Murphy and Ian Brennan revealed that the project was inspired by the popularity of the case on TikTok and Instagram, where true crime content creators have sparked a movement in support of the brothers. Murphy, who had personally followed the trials since moving to Los Angeles in 1989 at the same age as the brothers, noted his initial skepticism toward their abuse allegations but emphasized the series' intent to spark dialogue on male sexual abuse and societal biases at the time. Brennan similarly stated that the topic was relevant due to a modern "vernacular" for discussing trauma and mental health that was absent during the trials.

It is the final season of the anthology to be developed with Murphy as a showrunner, with subsequent seasons being developed solely by Brennan.

=== Writing ===
The season was co-written by Murphy, Brennan, David McMillan, Reilly Smith, and Todd Kubrak.

Through a Rashomon-style narrative structure, the series presents the murders of José and Kitty Menendez and the brothers' allegations of sexual abuse from multiple conflicting perspectives. It alternates between the viewpoints of multiple characters, including the Menendez family, defense attorney Leslie Abramson, and journalist Dominick Dunne, among others. Murphy described the approach as a deliberate choice to avoid a singular "truth," emphasizing ambiguity in the brothers' abuse claims and the parents' behavior. Brennan elaborated on the format's inspiration from Akira Kurosawa's 1950 film Rashomon, noting its utility in true crime storytelling where evidence is contested. He highlighted how the format challenges viewers to question media portrayals of the Menendez case.

The season's fifth episode, titled "The Hurt Man", was written by Brennan and directed by Michael Uppendahl. According to Murphy, it was not initially planned as a one-shot episode, but during the writing process, he realized that "the most powerful way to do it would be [...] in one shot so that [viewers] could not look away", as his goal was "to give Erik Menendez his day in court, to talk about what had happened to him uninterrupted, with no bias". He stated that the dialogue was based on Erik's documented statements, transcripts, and writings to maintain authenticity. Three days prior to the 2023 Writers Guild of America strike, Brennan completed the 34-page screenplay of the episode in one sitting for three hours. Koch received the screenplay in June that year, nine months before they filmed the episode in March 2024. He stated, "The script became the backbone of my [preparation for the role] because it was the backstory that I didn't have to write for myself, for the character." Brennan shared the full screenplay to Deadline in June 2025.

=== Casting ===
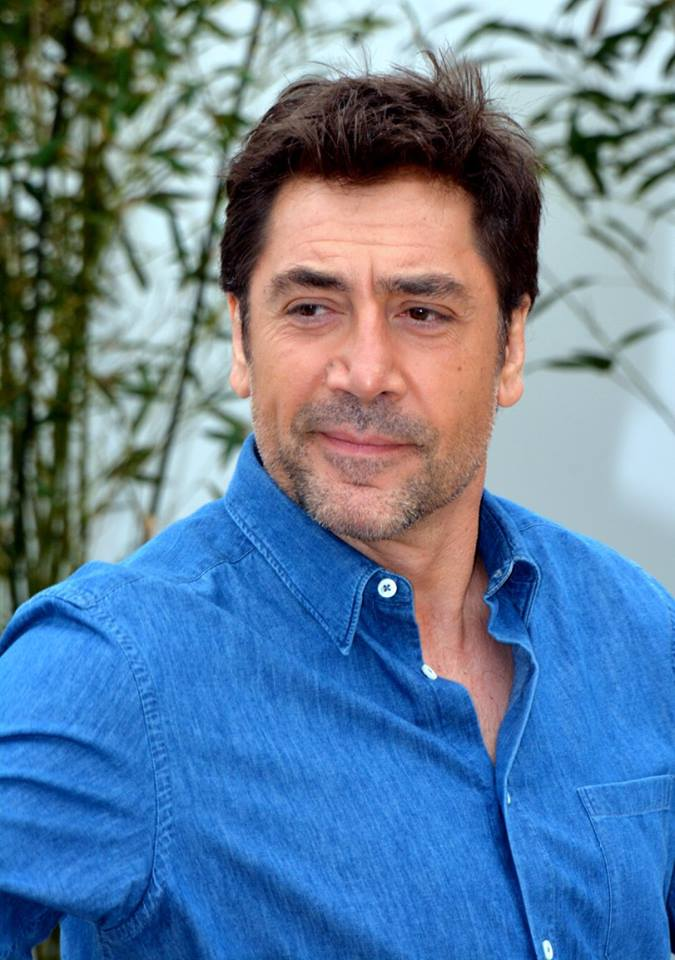
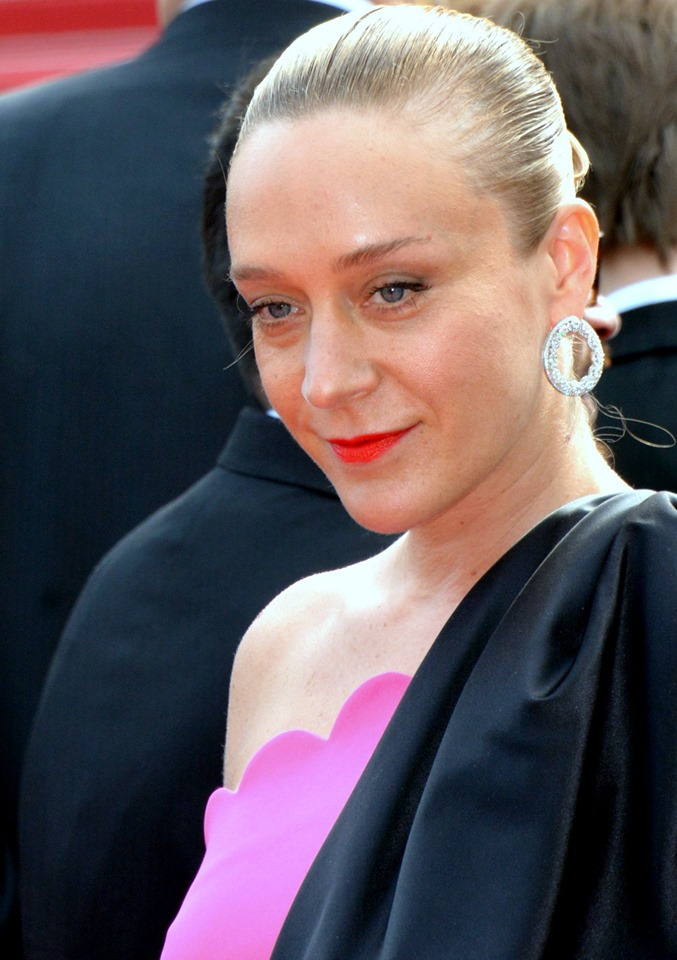
Javier Bardem (left) and Chloë Sevigny (right) portrayed José and Kitty Menendez, respectively.

Casting directors Tiffany Little Canfield and Josh Einsohn conducted an extensive search for the roles of Lyle and Erik Menendez through an open casting call and by reaching out to colleges and theater programs. According to Einsohn, it was essential to find actors capable of portraying both the "sympathetic and monstrous sides" of the characters, given the plot's shifting perspective. Canfield and Einsohn reviewed thousands of auditions during the process. In June 2023, Cooper Koch and Nicholas Alexander Chavez were cast as Erik and Lyle, respectively. Koch previously auditioned for the same role in the NBC limited series Law & Order True Crime: The Menendez Murders and the Lifetime television film Menendez: Blood Brothers (both 2017).

In January 2024, Javier Bardem and Chloë Sevigny joined the cast as José and Kitty Menendez, respectively, with Nathan Lane being cast as journalist Dominick Dunne. All three had previously worked with Murphy: Bardem starred in the 2010 film Eat Pray Love, Sevigny appeared in two seasons of American Horror Story, and Lane portrayed F. Lee Bailey in The People v. O. J. Simpson: American Crime Story (2016). In February, Ari Graynor joined as Erik's defense attorney, Leslie Abramson. Leslie Grossman, who has worked with Murphy in multiple seasons of American Horror Story, was added that same month as Judalon Smyth.

=== Principal photography ===
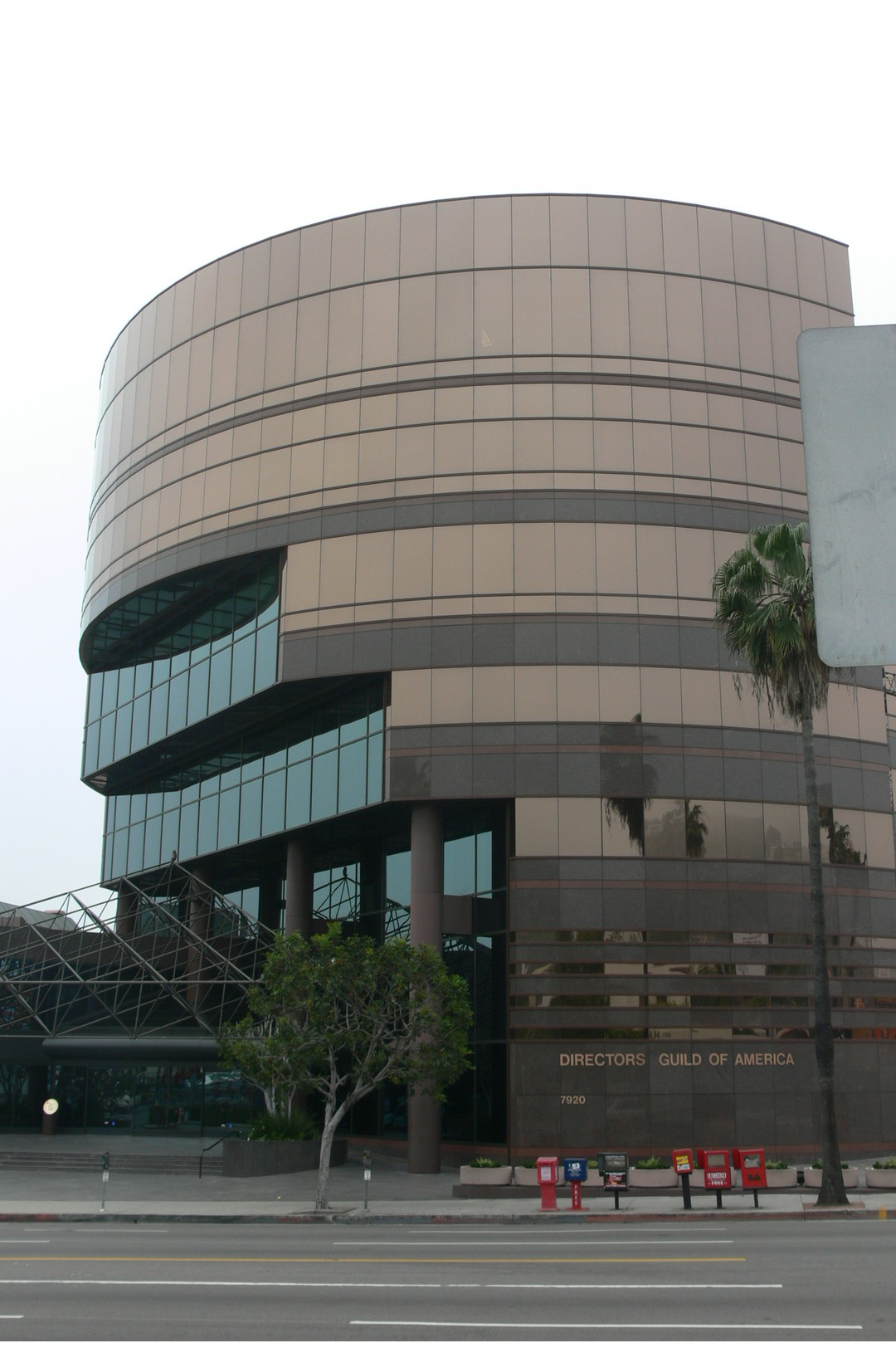
The memorial service scene was filmed at the Directors Guild of America building in Sunset Boulevard, where José and Kitty Menendez's actual memorial service was held in 1989.

Production was initially set for September 2023, but was postponed due to the 2023 Hollywood labor disputes. Principal photography took place from January to July 2024 in Los Angeles. Jason McCormick, a frequent collaborator of Murphy, served as the cinematographer for six out of nine episodes, while Baz Idoine served as the cinematographer for the remaining three. The episodic directors were Michael Uppendahl, Ian Brennan, Carl Franklin, Paris Barclay, and Max Winkler.

To recreate late-1980s Los Angeles, production designer Matthew Flood Ferguson and set decorator Melissa Licth utilized both location shooting and soundstage builds. The interior of the Menendez family home in Beverly Hills was constructed on a soundstage to allow for historical accuracy. Key architectural details from the actual family room where the crime took place were meticulously recreated, including the vaulted beamed ceilings, the specific distance from the French doors to the furniture, and the oversized built-in bookcase. The exterior was a composite of three separate locations: one for the front of the property, a second for the pool and guest house, and a third for the tennis court. Ferguson noted that finding a period-appropriate tennis court was difficult because the United States Tennis Association had changed court colors from green to blue in the years since the murders, eventually leading the production to locate a private court that still featured the original green surface.

Other iconic Los Angeles settings were also featured; the restaurant Spago and the Directors Guild of America building were shot on location, while the interior of Dominick Dunne's Chateau Marmont suite was reconstructed on a soundstage. To ensure accuracy, Ferguson and supervising art director Helen Harwell surveyed an actual suite at the Chateau Marmont to replicate details such as the casement doors and the wrap-around balcony.

For the fifth episode, "The Hurt Man", which was filmed in a single continuous take, Ferguson designed an interview room set with removable walls to accommodate the camera crane's movement. He incorporated an interior casement window on a hinge to serve as a visual element that could also open to allow for specific camera placements during the unbroken shot.

Uppendahl opted minimal rehearsal for "The Hurt Man" to preserve authenticity, with Koch and Graynor only rehearsing once on set before filming. McCormick began with a static shot and gradually zoomed in on Koch's face, while Graynor's face remained unseen as she slowly disappeared from the shot. A total of eight takes were filmed over two days; the eighth and final take was selected for the final broadcast. Koch described the process as emotionally draining and "super nerve-wracking," citing that his performance in the first two takes felt dry because he was nervous around Murphy.

The murder sequence was filmed over three to four days, which Koch described as heavily choreographed and technically demanding. Although the series depicts multiple versions of the killings from differing perspectives, the version shown in the episode "Blame It on the Rain" most closely reflects the crime scene photos and accounts presented during the trials.

At one point during filming, Koch and Chavez visited the former Menendez residence on Elm Drive in Beverly Hills and were allowed to enter the house.

=== Editing ===
According to editor Peggy Tachdjian, the first episode, "Blame It on the Rain", was structured to introduce the Menendez family, depict the murder of José and Kitty Menendez, and portray the aftermath and funeral sequence, while balancing dramatic elements with moments of dark comedy. Tachdjian stated that Murphy sought to depict the severity of the crime early in the season in order to establish it as the central event. As a result, the murder sequence was carefully storyboarded and rehearsed, with production recreating elements of the reported crime scene. Tachdjian's initial edit leaned toward a serious tone, but director Carl Franklin encouraged incorporating elements of dark humor, particularly in the funeral scene featuring the Milli Vanilli song "Girl I'm Gonna Miss You", which was extended in post‑production to emphasize its "awkwardness".

=== Music ===
Monsters: The Lyle and Erik Menendez Story (Soundtrack from the Netflix Series)

Soundtrack album by Thomas Newman, Julia Newman
- Released: September 13, 2024
- Length: 1:12:00
- Language: English
- Label: Netflix Music

Thomas Newman co-composed the original score alongside his daughter, Julia Newman. The official soundtrack album, titled Monsters: The Lyle and Erik Menendez Story (Soundtrack from the Netflix Series), was released by Netflix Music on September 13, 2024, featuring 37 tracks of original music.

Track listing
No.	Title	Length
1.	"North Elm"	1:41
2.	"Hum"	3:27
3.	"Baijiu"	1:47
4.	"Hotel Bel Air"	2:22
5.	"Leslie"	1:35
6.	"Goodbye Dominique"	2:11
7.	"They Didn't Look Real"	3:17
8.	"August 20"	2:29
9.	"I Love You Daddy"	1:26
10.	"Haha"	1:11
11.	"Shotgun Murders"	2:36
12.	"Stop Like You Promised"	1:35
13.	"You Adored Me"	1:35
14.	"Apology Tour"	2:08
15.	"Alfa Romeo"	3:09
16.	"Hangman"	2:24
17.	"Flor"	1:29
18.	"Hey Mafia"	2:08
19.	"Tony"	1:40
20.	"Christmas"	1:09
21.	"Rubik's Cube"	1:06
22.	"Beverly Hills"	0:49
23.	"The Gas Chamber"	1:29
24.	"Judelon Rats"	3:13
25.	"Norma"	1:07
26.	"Ice Cream"	0:48
27.	"Suicide Note"	1:25
28.	"Jerome"	4:14
29.	"White Bronco"	5:04
30.	"The Juice"	1:12
31.	"Skeleton"	1:33
32.	"C. Gessler"	0:57
33.	"Buckshot"	0:46
34.	"Anna"	1:17
35.	"Say You One"	1:12
36.	"Tequila Sunrise"	2:00
37.	"Chum"	1:13
Total length:		1:12:00

The season also features a selection of licensed songs: "Blame It on the Rain", "Girl I'm Gonna Miss You", and "Girl You Know It's True" by Milli Vanilli, as well as "Don't Dream It's Over" by Crowded House, "Dirty Cash (Money Talks)" by The Adventures of Stevie V, "Ice Ice Baby" by Vanilla Ice, "The Power" by Snap!, "Little Lies" by Fleetwood Mac, "Santa Baby" by Eartha Kitt, and "Rockin' Around the Christmas Tree" by Brenda Lee.

== Release ==
The red-carpet premiere was held at Grauman's Egyptian Theatre in Los Angeles on September 17, 2024. All nine episodes were released on Netflix on September 19, 2024.

== Reception ==
=== Audience viewership ===
The season debuted at the number-one spot on Netflix worldwide, garnering 12.3 million views (or 97.5 million hours viewed) within four days of its release. On its second week, it remained the most-watched series on the platform after earning 19.5 million views (or 153.8 million hours viewed). It received 13.1 million views (or 103.6 million hours viewed) on its third week and 8.7 million views (or 68.6 million hours viewed) on its fourth week, demonstrating a modest week-to-week decline and sustained viewer engagement. The season remained in Netflix's global Top 10 chart for seven weeks, matching the record set by Dahmer – Monster: The Jeffrey Dahmer Story. According to Netflix's Engagement Report for the second half of 2024 (July–December), Monsters: The Lyle and Erik Menendez Story ranked as the third most-watched television series and the most-watched limited series on the platform, accumulating 69.7 million views within three months.

On the Nielsen Streaming Chart, it debuted as the top one streaming content (both for films and television series) with 1.72 billion minutes watched, and had a 40% rise on its second week with 2.4 billion minutes watched, the highest since Bridgerton in June 2024.

=== Critical response ===
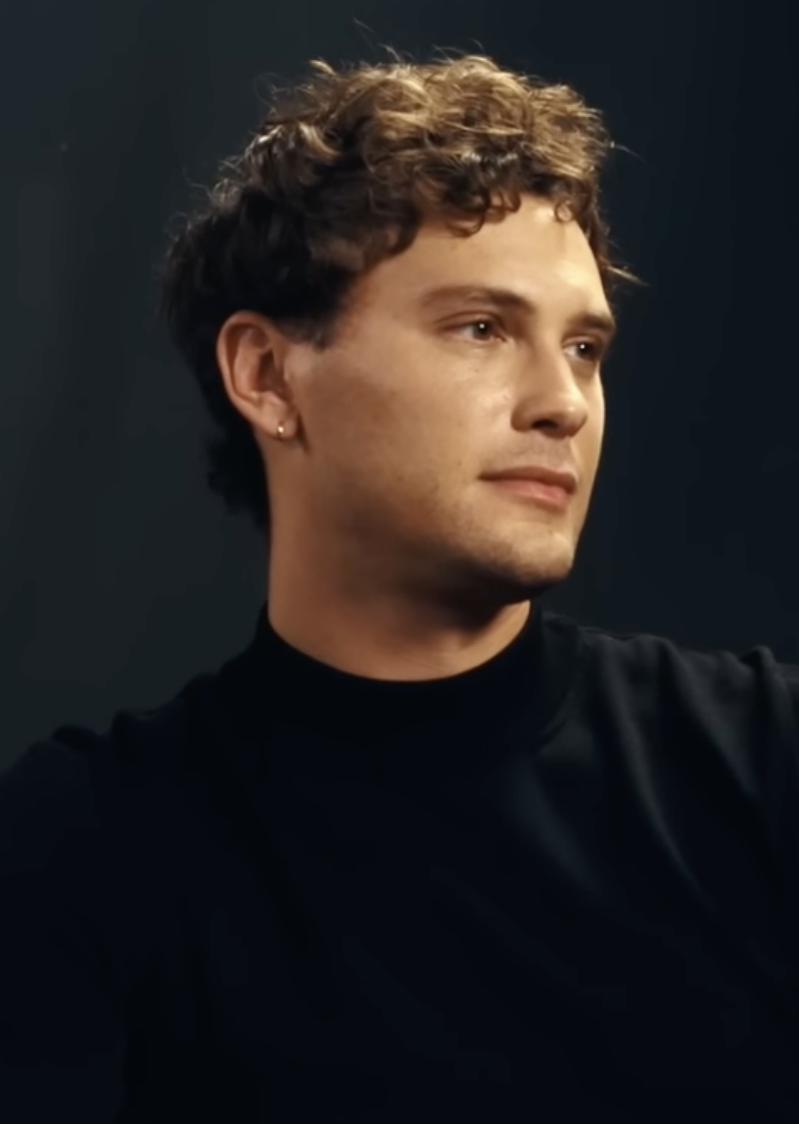
Cooper Koch received critical acclaim for his performance.

On the review aggregator website Rotten Tomatoes, 47% of 30 critics' reviews are positive, with an average rating of 5.0/10. The website's consensus reads: "Well-acted but off-puttingly sordid, Monsters leaves viewers feeling guilty without enough pleasure to compensate." Metacritic, which uses a weighted average, assigned a score of 47 out of 100 based on 12 critics, indicating "mixed or average" reviews.

Critics primarily praised the one-shot episode "The Hurt Man" for its emotional depth and Cooper Koch's performance, but expressed mixed reactions to the season's overall tone and its use of the Rashomon effect, a narrative technique that presents events through conflicting perspectives. In his review for Vanity Fair, Richard Lawson praised "The Hurt Man" as "a formal wonder, bold in its simplicity", and described Koch's performance as an emotionally powerful portrayal of Erik's trauma and detachment from reality. However, Lawson criticized the season's overall inconsistency, arguing that while the episode evokes empathy for Erik, subsequent episodes cast doubt on his credibility and portray the brothers more cynically. This tonal shift, according to Lawson, undermines the impact of the episode and makes it disconnected from the rest of the season. Inkoo Kang of The New Yorker similarly singled out "The Hurt Man" as "some of Murphy's most moving and startling work in ages", while criticizing the remaining episodes for attempting to reconcile the alleged abuse suffered by the brothers with their retaliatory violence.

Aramide Tinubu of Variety praised the first half of the season, highlighting "The Hurt Man" as a standout and commending the cast's performances, but ultimately criticized its excessive length and "futile and bizarre" narrative. Daniel Feinberg of The Hollywood Reporter similarly described the season as "unjustifiably long", but praised "The Hurt Man" for its writing and Koch's performance. He further commended Javier Bardem's performance, calling him "terrifying in a performance that's wildly outsized but offers enough subtlety to position his howling patriarch as both a chilling villain and as a victim himself". The Guardian's Jesse Hassenger likewise criticized the season as overlong and repetitive, arguing that its strong performances could not compensate for its unfocused narrative. He added that Koch's emotional performance contrasts with that of Nicholas Alexander Chavez, whom Hassenger described as "doing a coked-up impression of Tom Cruise". Similarly, The Hindu's Pallavi Keswani criticized the season as "a sensational mess, so occupied with the ornamentation of facts that it loses the plot halfway through". Keswani argued that its fragmented narrative and shifting perspectives make it difficult to distinguish fact from dramatization.

Several critics have also expressed concerns about the season's ethical implications and its sexual content. Kayleigh Donaldson of TheWrap described it as "something giddily salacious rather than a portrait of familial trauma", noting that, despite dealing with sensitive topics such as sexual assault and child abuse, it becomes "hugely misguided" for focusing on "sensuality, with the brothers both forever in Speedos and shot as though the series was a perfume ad". The Express Tribune's Mahnoor Vazir also questioned the exploitation of real-life tragedies for entertainment. While Vazir praised "The Hurt Man" for being "painfully intimate" and "a masterclass in filmmaking", she criticized the season for failing to sustain this tone and for missing an opportunity to explore male sexual abuse more fully. She also condemned its portrayal of an unsubstantiated incestuous relationship between the brothers as "cheap and entirely unnecessary".

=== Controversy ===
The season received widespread criticism for suggesting an incestuous relationship between Lyle and Erik. The Hollywood Reporter's Kevin Dolak cited several scenes as examples, including the brothers briefly kissing while wearing minimal clothing, Lyle behaving possessively toward Erik and dancing intimately with him at a party before putting his thumb in his mouth, and a sequence in which their mother, Kitty, finds them showering together. In the same sequence, Dominick Dunne speculates that the brothers may have killed their parents to prevent Kitty from exposing their alleged affair.

Nicole Vassell of Glamour criticized the portrayal as "a jarring addition to a story that is already tough to stomach", noting that an incestuous relationship between the brothers had not been a significant part of previous accounts of the case. Vassell argued that the storyline risked distracting from the brothers' allegations of sexual abuse and criticized the series for using speculative elements to heighten drama, arguing that such fictionalization was particularly problematic when depicting real people. Some commentators, however, interpreted the scenes as an attempt to depict the effects of prolonged abuse on the brothers' understanding of intimacy, rather than as a literal claim that they had an incestuous relationship.

Trial expert and journalist Robert Rand, author of the 2018 book The Menendez Murders, labeled the incest allegations as "fantasy" and pointed out that there was no credible evidence to support such claims. He explained that while some rumors circulated during the trial, they were baseless, and the series distorted the brothers' relationship for dramatic effect. Rand claimed that Lyle Menendez testified he had never had a sexual relationship with his brother.

In response, Murphy defended the incestuous depiction as an "obligation for storytellers", stating, "What the show is doing is presenting the points of view and theories from so many people who were involved in the case. Dominick Dunne wrote several articles talking about that theory." Vanity Fair subsequently noted that Dunne never suggested such a theory in his reporting for the publication.

When asked about the controversy, Chavez said he preferred to let the project speak for itself, calling it "a question that’s honestly best reserved for Ryan and the creators of the show". Koch, meanwhile, said he "absolutely does not" believe the brothers had an incestuous relationship and that the series was not intended to "make or break that truth".

=== Response from Lyle and Erik Menendez ===
On September 20, 2024, Erik Menendez released a statement through his wife's, Tammi Menendez, X account, stating:

I believed we had moved beyond the lies and ruinous character portrayals of Lyle, creating a caricature of Lyle rooted in horrible and blatant lies rampant in the show. I can only believe they were done so on purpose. It is with a heavy heart that I say, I believe Ryan Murphy cannot be this naive and inaccurate about the facts of our lives so as to do this without bad intent.

It is sad for me to know that Netflix's dishonest portrayal of the tragedies surrounding our crime have taken the painful truths several steps backward – back through time to an era when the prosecution built a narrative on a belief system that males were not sexually abused, and that males experienced rape trauma differently than women. Those awful lies have been disputed and exposed by countless brave victims over the last two decades who have broken through their personal shame and bravely spoken out. So now Murphy shapes his horrible narrative through vile and appalling character portrayals of Lyle and of me and disheartening slander.

Is the truth not enough? Let the truth stand as the truth. How demoralizing to know that one man with power can undermine decades of progress in shedding light on childhood trauma. Violence is never an answer, never a solution, and is always tragic. As such, I hope it is never forgotten that violence against a child creates a hundred horrendous and silent crime scenes darkly shadowed behind glitter and glamor and rarely exposed until tragedy penetrates everyone involved. To all those who have reached out and supported me, thank you from the bottom of my heart.

Addressing Erik's response, Murphy stated that "60 to 65 percent" of the season focused on the abuse allegations and said the subject was handled carefully, with the brothers given an opportunity to present their perspective. He added, "There were four people involved in that—two of them are dead, and two of them are alive with their point of view. But what about the parents? We had an obligation as storytellers to also try and put in their perspective based on our research, which we did." In a different interview, he further explained that the season incorporated the Rashomon effect to "[talk] about countless perspectives, and a perspective is not a lie. A perspective is an opinion." Bardem, Sevigny, Koch, Chavez, and Lane similarly defended that the series does not endorse a single interpretation of the case.

Koch, who has voiced his support for the brothers and their claims of abuse, said of Erik's criticism, "It definitely affected me and it made me feel things. [...] I understand how difficult it would be to have the worst part of your life be televised for millions of people to see. It's so exposing. I understand how he feels and I stand by him." He later stated that he discussed Erik's criticisms with him during their meeting at Richard J. Donovan Correctional Facility. During the visit, Koch also met Lyle and over 30 other inmates as part of a prison reform meeting led by Kim Kardashian. Despite Erik's criticism of the series, he praised Koch's performance, stating, "I've heard nothing but great things about [Koch] and about episode five, and that [he's] going to win an Emmy. And I hope that [he does]."

On February 20, 2025, in an interview with TMZ, Lyle stated that he and Erik are grateful that the series shed light on child abuse. He also praised Koch and Chavez for their performances, calling Koch "pretty extraordinary".

=== Response from other depicted figures ===
On September 25, 2024, Lyle and Erik's relatives issued a statement describing the season as "a phobic, gross, anachronistic, serial episodic nightmare". They added, "Our family has been victimized by this grotesque shockadrama. [...] Perhaps, after all, Monsters is all about Ryan Murphy." Murphy dismissed their response as "faux outrage" and described it as predictable, arguing that the series was "the best thing that's happened to [Lyle and Erik] in 30 years", citing the renewed public interest in their case following the season's commercial success.

Erik's lead defense attorney during the trials, Leslie Abramson, who has since retired, was approached by a paparazzo in October 2024 and asked about the series. She responded, "That piece of shit I heard about? No. I don't watch any of those," referring to the series and other dramatizations of the case.

=== Accolades ===
Award	Date of ceremony	Category	Nominee(s)	Result	Ref.
GQ Men of the Year Awards	December 4, 2024	International Actor of the Year	Cooper Koch	Won	
The Daily Californian's Arts Awards	December 23, 2024	Best Actor in a Drama — Television	Cooper Koch	Won	
Golden Globe Awards	January 5, 2025	Best Limited or Anthology Series or Television Film	Monsters: The Lyle and Erik Menendez Story	Nominated	
Golden Globe Awards	January 5, 2025	Best Actor – Miniseries or Television Film	Cooper Koch	Nominated	
Golden Globe Awards	January 5, 2025	Best Supporting Actor – Series, Miniseries or Television Film	Javier Bardem	Nominated	
Set Decorators Society of America Awards	February 7, 2025	Best Achievement in Décor/Design of a Television Movie or Limited Series	Melissa Licht, Matthew Flood Ferguson	Nominated	
NAACP Image Awards	February 22, 2025	Outstanding Directing in a Drama Series	Carl Franklin	Nominated	
NAACP Image Awards	February 22, 2025	Outstanding Directing in a Drama Series	Paris Barclay	Nominated	
Screen Actors Guild Awards	February 24, 2025	Outstanding Performance by a Male Actor in a Miniseries or Television Movie	Javier Bardem	Nominated	
Actors and Actresses Union Awards	March 10, 2025	Best Actor in an International Production	Javier Bardem	Won	
Queerty Awards	March 11, 2025	Best TV Performance	Cooper Koch	Nominated	
Premios Aura	April 6, 2025	Hispanic Presence in an International Series	Javier Bardem	Won	
BMI Film & TV Awards	May 14, 2025	Streaming Series Award	Thomas Newman, Julia Newman	Won	
Astra TV Awards	June 10, 2025	Best Supporting Actor in a Limited Series or TV Movie	Javier Bardem	Nominated	
Dorian Awards	July 8, 2025	Best TV Performance – Drama	Cooper Koch	Nominated	
Primetime Creative Arts Emmy Awards	September 6, 2025	Outstanding Casting for a Limited or Anthology Series or Movie	Tiffany Little Canfield, John Eihnson, Bernard Tesley	Nominated	
Primetime Creative Arts Emmy Awards	September 6, 2025	Outstanding Music Composition for a Limited or Anthology Series, Movie or Special (Original Dramatic Score)	Thomas Newman, Julia Newman (for "Spree")	Nominated	
Primetime Creative Arts Emmy Awards	September 6, 2025	Outstanding Period Costumes	Stephanie Bradley, Michelle Sandvig, Shannon Campbell (for "Blame It on The Rain")	Nominated	
Primetime Creative Arts Emmy Awards	September 6, 2025	Outstanding Period or Fantasy/Sci-Fi Hairstyling	Karen Bartek, Brittany Madrigal, Elissa Ruminer, Analyn Cruz, Kaity Licina (for "Brother, Can You Spare A Dime?")	Nominated	
Primetime Creative Arts Emmy Awards	September 6, 2025	Outstanding Period or Fantasy/Sci-Fi Makeup (Non-Prosthetic)	Miho Suzuki, Sabrina Wilson, Michael Anthony Ornelaz, Ana Lozano (for "Hang Men")	Nominated	
Primetime Creative Arts Emmy Awards	September 6, 2025	Outstanding Picture Editing for a Limited or Anthology Series or Movie	Peggy Tachdjian (for Blame It on The Rain")	Won	
Primetime Creative Arts Emmy Awards	September 6, 2025	Outstanding Sound Mixing for a Limited or Anthology Series or Movie	Jamie Hardt, Laura Wiest, John Bauman, Mehrnaz Mohabati (for Blame It on The Rain")	Nominated	
Primetime Emmy Awards	September 14, 2025	Outstanding Limited or Anthology Series	Monsters: The Lyle and Erik Menendez Story	Nominated	
Primetime Emmy Awards	September 14, 2025	Outstanding Lead Actor in a Limited or Anthology Series or Movie	Cooper Koch	Nominated	
Primetime Emmy Awards	September 14, 2025	Outstanding Supporting Actress in a Limited or Anthology Series or Movie	Chloë Sevigny (for "Don't Dream It's Over")	Nominated	
Primetime Emmy Awards	September 14, 2025	Outstanding Supporting Actor in a Limited or Anthology Series or Movie	Javier Bardem (for "Don't Dream It's Over")	Nominated	
Online Film & Television Association TV Awards	September 26, 2025	Best Limited or Anthology Series	Monsters: The Lyle and Erik Menendez Story	Nominated	
Online Film & Television Association TV Awards	September 26, 2025	Best Actor in a Motion Picture, Limited or Anthology Series	Cooper Koch	Nominated	
Online Film & Television Association TV Awards	September 26, 2025	Best Supporting Actor in a Motion Picture, Limited or Anthology Series	Javier Bardem	Nominated	
Online Film & Television Association TV Awards	September 26, 2025	Best Supporting Actress in a Motion Picture, Limited or Anthology Series	Chloë Sevigny	Nominated	
Online Film & Television Association TV Awards	September 26, 2025	Best Casting & Ensemble in a Motion Picture, Limited or Anthology Series	Monsters: The Lyle and Erik Menendez Story	Nominated	
Online Film & Television Association TV Awards	September 26, 2025	Best Writing of a Motion Picture or Anthology Series	Monsters: The Lyle and Erik Menendez Story	Nominated	
Online Film & Television Association TV Awards	September 26, 2025	Best Music Composition in a Motion Picture, Limited or Anthology Series	Monsters: The Lyle and Erik Menendez Story	Nominated	
Online Film & Television Association TV Awards	September 26, 2025	Best Picture Editing in a Motion Picture, Limited or Anthology Series	Monsters: The Lyle and Erik Menendez Story	Nominated	
Online Film & Television Association TV Awards	September 26, 2025	Best Makeup — Period and/or Character	Monsters: The Lyle and Erik Menendez Story	Nominated	

== Impact ==
The series is widely credited with reigniting public interest in the Menendez case. Following its premiere, then-Los Angeles County District Attorney George Gascón stated in October 2024 that his office had received "an influx of calls" regarding Lyle and Erik Menendez. He later announced that his office would review a habeas corpus petition submitted in 2023 by attorneys for the brothers. Later that year, he formally recommended that the brothers be resentenced, stating that although they had committed murder, they had "paid their debt to society". In May 2025, the brothers' sentences were reduced from life without parole to 50 years to life, making them eligible for parole due to their ages at the time of the crime. They were denied parole in August of the same year but are set to have their cases reconsidered at a hearing tentatively scheduled for February 2027. Legal experts interviewed by Business Insider noted that while the series did not constitute new evidence, it functioned as a "catalyst" that increased public attention and may have accelerated legal review processes.

Online discussion surrounding the series included the emergence of fan communities centered on the brothers' physical appearance, which prompted questions about the potential for true crime media to encourage phenomena such as hybristophilia. Branding expert Jeetendr Sehdev of Forbes characterized it as part of a recurring pattern in American media involving fascination with notorious criminal figures. Relatedly, media coverage observed a resurgence of interest in 1980s and early 1990s "old money" and preppy fashion styles inspired by the series' costume design, some of which were recreated as Halloween costumes. In October 2024, Saturday Night Live produced a cut-for-time Halloween-themed sketch featuring Michael Longfellow and Marcello Hernandez as Lyle and Erik.

The Menendez family's former residence in Beverly Hills, where the 1989 murders took place, was reported to have experienced an influx of tourists and visitors, including some traveling from outside the United States. Residents in the surrounding area expressed concerns about increased foot traffic, and the Beverly Hills Police Department reportedly received calls regarding trespassing, including incidents where visitors attempted to climb or approach restricted areas of the property in order to recreate photographs of the brothers taken at the residence. A covered barricade and fencing were installed around the property, both to deter trespassing and due to ongoing renovations.

According to Billboard, streaming activity in the United States for Milli Vanilli songs featured on the soundtrack increased significantly following the series' release: "Girl I'm Gonna Miss You" saw an increase of 258% within the first week and entered Billboard's TikTok Top 50 chart at number 37, while "Blame It on the Rain" (which ranked number 35 on the TikTok Top 50) and "Girl You Know It's True" increased by 68% and 32.5%, respectively. Milli Vanilli debuted on the Artist 100 chart at number 88, and their extended play 4 entered the Billboard 200 chart at number 197. "Blame It on the Rain" also ranked at number six on Billboard's Top TV Songs chart, while "Don't Dream It's Over" by Crowded House ranked at number three. In the United Kingdom, UK singles charts reported that two songs from the series' soundtrack re-entered the Top 40: "Don't Dream It's Over", which charted at number 37 and had previously peaked at number 25 in 1987, and "Girl I'm Gonna Miss You", which charted at number 40 and had previously peaked at number 2 in 1989.

== Future ==
At the season's Los Angeles premiere, Murphy announced that the third season of the anthology series would center on murderer and graverobber Ed Gein, to be portrayed by Charlie Hunnam. On October 4, it was confirmed that the season would be titled The Original Monster, exploring Gein's life as the first "celebrity serial killer" and examining how true crime evolved into a pop culture phenomenon. The title was later reworked to Monster: The Ed Gein Story, and the season was released on October 3, 2025. A fourth season centering on parricide suspect Lizzie Borden was released on September 17, 2026.

Murphy expressed his interest in extending the season with "one or two episodes". He stated, "It's been discussed. [...] Everyone has been interested in that. I think everyone wants to see how this story ends because this story is not over." However, he noted that this would depend on whether Koch and Chavez, who portrayed Erik and Lyle, respectively, agreed to reprise their roles. When asked whether he would return, Koch replied, "I don't know, I don't think so. I think we told the story and [...] I think it's good where it is now."

== See also ==
- Law & Order True Crime: The Menendez Murders, a 2017 limited series about Lyle and Erik Menendez that aired on NBC
