= Julia Newman =

American film composer

- Genres: Film score, classical, electronic, ambient
- Occupation: Composer
- Years active: 2019–present

Julia Newman is an American composer best known for her television scores and her collaborations with her father, film composer Thomas Newman, and television showrunner Ryan Murphy.

== Early life and education ==
Newman was born and raised in Los Angeles, one of three children of film composer Thomas Newman and Ann Marie Zirbes. Newman comes from a family of film composers, including her father, Thomas Newman; her grandfather, Alfred Newman; and uncles Randy Newman and David Newman.

Julia Newman was exposed to film composing at an early age, and visited the recording studio named after her grandfather as a child. She received a Bachelor of Fine Arts from the California Institute of the Arts, and a Masters Degree from Screen Scoring program at the USC Thornton School of Music in 2020. While at USC, Newman begin scoring short films, before transitioning to feature films and television work. With her father, Thomas Newman, she composed the score for Feud: Capote vs. The Swans, the first of her collaborations with showrunner Ryan Murphy. Newman again collaborated with her father and Ryan Murphy in Monsters: The Lyle and Erik Menendez Story, which was nominated for the Primetime Emmy Award for Outstanding Music Composition for a Limited or Anthology Series, Movie or Special (Original Dramatic Score).

== Television ==
Year	Title	Director	Notes
2020	Coupled	Emma Sofia Fazzuoli	Web series (6 episodes)
2024	Feud: Capote vs. The Swans	Ryan Murphy	(8 episodes)
2024	Monsters: The Lyle and Erik Menendez Story	Ryan Murphy	(9 episodes) (co-composed with Thomas Newman)
2024	American Horror Stories	Alexis Martin Woodall	(Season 3, Episode 8, "Leprechaun")
2024	Doctor Odyssey	various	(14 episodes)

== Films ==
Year	Title	Director	Notes
2022	Dog	Channing Tatum and Reid Carolin	Electro-Acoustic Programing
2022	At the Gates	Augustus Meleo Bernstein	Composer
2023	Elemental	Peter Sohn	Score coordinator
2024	Freak Bikes (documentary)	Ryan Henry Mekenian	Composer

== Short Films ==
Year	Title	Director	Notes
2019	Van Life	Michael G. Gabel	Composer
2019	Simply Having	Michael Strassner	Composer
2019	The Bicycle Kitchen	Ryan Henry Mekenian	Composer
2020	In Her Corner	Emma Cataldo	Composer
2020	Comet	Kendall Huff	Composer
2020	Spokespeople	Ryan Henry Mekenian	Composer
2021	Disconnected	Daniel Sheahan	Composer
2021	Adaptation	Elisabetta Fox Piantoni	Composer
2022	Sunflower	Elizabeth Tawose	Composer
2022	Lucy	Emma Sofia Fazzuoli	Composer
2023	Muse	Kate Marin Davis	Composer
2023	Woman Meets Girl	Murry Peeters	Composer

== See also ==
- List of Academy Award-winning families
