= Long take =

Film shot lasting much longer than conventional shots

In filmmaking, a long take (also called a continuous take, continuous shot, or oner) is shot with a duration much longer than the conventional editing pace either of the film itself or of films in general. Significant camera movement and elaborate blocking are often elements in long takes, but not necessarily so. The term "long take" should not be confused with the term "long shot", which refers to the use of a long-focus lens and not to the duration of the take. The length of a long take was originally limited to how much film the magazine of a motion picture camera could hold, but the advent of digital video has considerably lengthened the maximum potential length of a take.

== Early examples ==
This continuous shot from The Stranger (1946) lasts over four minutes. By shooting long takes, director Orson Welles could prevent the editor from having footage cut away, thereby exerting control over the final edit.

When filming Rope (1948), Alfred Hitchcock intended for the film to have the effect of one long continuous take, but the camera magazines available could hold not more than 1000 feet of 35 mm film. As a result, each take uses up to a whole roll of film and lasts up to 10 minutes. Many takes end with a dolly shot to a featureless surface (such as the back of a character's jacket), with the following take beginning at the same point by zooming out. The entire film consists of only 11 shots. (Note: For a complete analysis of Hitchcock's hidden and conventional cuts in Rope, see David Bordwell's text in "Poetics of Cinema", 2008.)

Andy Warhol and collaborating avant-garde filmmaker Jonas Mekas shot a 485-minute-long experimental film, Empire (1965), on 10 rolls of film using an Auricon camera via 16 mm film, which allowed longer takes than its 35 mm counterpart. "The camera took a 1,200 ft roll of film that would shoot for roughly 33 minutes."

== Later examples ==
A handful of theatrically released feature films, such as Timecode (2000), Russian Ark (2002), PVC-1 (2007), Victoria (2015) and Boiling Point (2021) are filmed in one single take. Others are composed entirely of a series of long takes, while many more may be well known for one or two specific long takes within otherwise more conventionally edited films. In 2012, the art collective The Hut Project produced The Look of Performance, a digital film shot in a single 360° take lasting 3 hours, 33 minutes and 8 seconds. The film was shot at 50 frames per second, meaning the final exhibited work lasts 7 hours, 6 minutes and 17 seconds.

Another example from television can be seen in the first season of HBO's True Detective. In episode four, "Who Goes There", protagonist Detective Rustin Cohle (portrayed by Matthew McConaughey) is undercover as part of a biker gang who have decided to brazenly rob a drug den located in a dangerous neighborhood. The shot begins with the bikers arriving at the drug den with McConaughey's character reluctantly in tow. The six-minute shot moves in and out of various residences, through several blocks and over a fence, while shots are fired by shouting gangsters, bikers and police as they arrive on the scene. McConaughey at first assists the biker gang, then turns on them to abduct the leader, dragging him along for more than half of the continuous shot. Director Cary Joji Fukunaga commented to The Guardian, "We required the involvement of every single department, like a live theatre show. We had make-up artists hiding in houses so they could dash out and put make-up on [Cohle's hostage] Ginger's head. We panned away for a second to do that. We also had ADs peppered around the neighborhood with extras who had specific things to yell and specific places to run. We had stunt guys coordinating with stunt drivers to pull up at the right time, special-effects guys outside throwing foam bricks and firing live rounds."

The John Wick series of films are known for their long-take fight scenes. This was due to the budgetary constraints of using only a single high-end camera for all the filming, and required close choreography with the various extras involved in the fights, who had to run behind the camera after being among the first fallen attackers to come in again as new attackers.

In 2010, artist engineer Jeff Lieberman co-directed a 4-minute music video with Eric Gunther, featuring the indie band OK Go performing their song "End Love". The video was shot in a continuous take using three cameras, running 18 hours from before sunset to 11 am the following day. The footage was condensed using time-lapse techniques ranging up to 170,000 times speedup, with some brief slow-motion segments also recorded at 1500 frames per second.

== Sequence shot ==
Example of a sequence shot that includes the same helicopter multiple times

A sequence shot is a shot, a long take, that includes a full narrative sequence containing the full scene in its duration, meaning different locations or different time periods. The term is usually used to refer to shots that constitute an entire scene. Such a shot may involve sophisticated camera movement. It is sometimes called by the French term plan-séquence. The use of the sequence shot allows for realistic or dramatically significant background and middle ground activity. Actors range about the set transacting their business while the camera shifts focus from one plane of depth to another and back again. Significant off-frame action is often followed with a moving camera, characteristically through a series of pans within a single continuous shot.

An example of this is the "Copacabana shot" featured in Martin Scorsese's Goodfellas (1990), in which Henry Hill (Ray Liotta) takes his girlfriend to a nightclub passing through the kitchen.

Robert Altman's The Player (1992) opens with an elaborately choreographed eight-minute shot that follows multiple characters in multiple locations, both inside and outside. Among the 17 scenes that comprise the shot, one character refers to the four-minute shot that opens Orson Welles’ Touch of Evil (1958).

Jean-Pierre and Luc Dardenne's Rosetta (1999) ends with a five-minute continuous shot. The Dardenne brothers also shot long sequences for Two Days, One Night (2014), some of them consisting of ten minutes.

== One-shot ==
=== Short film ===
One-shot short films became rare in the 21st century. Notable examples are Mehdi Fard Ghaderi's 2007 Alternation, 2011 Reversing Circles, and 2015 The Story of A Rainy Night. Connection at the End of the World is a 17-minute one-shot from 2025, directed by Sean Slimak.

=== Feature film ===
A "one-shot feature film" (also called "continuous-shot feature film") is a full-length movie filmed in one long take by a single camera, or manufactured to give the impression that it was. Given the extreme difficulty of the exercise and the technical requirements for a long lasting continuous shot, such full feature films have only been possible since the advent of digital movie cameras.

=== Television episodes ===
One-shot episodes became more common in the 2020s and at times overlapped with the bottle episode format, with some filmed as actual continuous takes and others manufactured to create the illusion of an uninterrupted shot. Notable examples include "The Hurt Man" from Monsters: The Lyle and Erik Menendez Story (2024), "The Oner" from The Studio (2025), and all four episodes of Adolescence (2025). "eps3.4_runtime-error.r00" from Mr. Robot (2017) was edited to stitch together multiple long takes into a seamless shot.

== Directors known for long takes ==
- Chantal Akerman
- Robert Altman
- Paul Thomas Anderson
- Wes Anderson
- Theo Angelopoulos
- Michelangelo Antonioni
- John Asher
- Philip Barantini
- Scott Barley
- Kathryn Bigelow
- Juan José Campanella
- John Cassavetes
- Damien Chazelle
- Alfonso Cuarón
- Jean-Pierre and Luc Dardenne
- Brian De Palma
- Lav Diaz
- Carl Theodor Dreyer
- Bruno Dumont
- David Fincher
- Luis García Berlanga
- Bi Gan
- Jean-Luc Godard
- Michael Haneke
- Alfred Hitchcock
- Joanna Hogg
- Hou Hsiao-hsien
- Miklós Jancsó
- Bong Joon-ho
- Mikhail Kalatozov
- Stanley Kubrick
- David Lean
- Sergio Leone
- Steve McQueen
- Sam Mendes
- Tsai Ming-liang
- Kenji Mizoguchi
- Gaspar Noé
- Max Ophüls
- Ruben Östlund
- Yasujirō Ozu
- Otto Preminger
- Jean Renoir
- Jacques Rivette
- Francesco Rosi
- Martin Scorsese
- M. Night Shyamalan
- Alexander Sokurov
- Rodrigo Sorogoyen
- Steven Spielberg
- Andrei Tarkovsky
- Béla Tarr
- Johnnie To
- Rob Tregenza
- Apichatpong Weerasethakul
- Orson Welles
- Joss Whedon
- Joe Wright
- Jia Zhangke

== See also ==
- One-shot film
- One shot (music video)
- Slow cutting
- Slow cinema
- Digital cinematography
- Digital cinema
- List of films shot in digital
- Art film

== Bibliography ==
- A History of Narrative Film by David Cook (ISBN 0-393-97868-0)
