= Ian Brennan (writer) =

American screenwriter, producer, director and actor

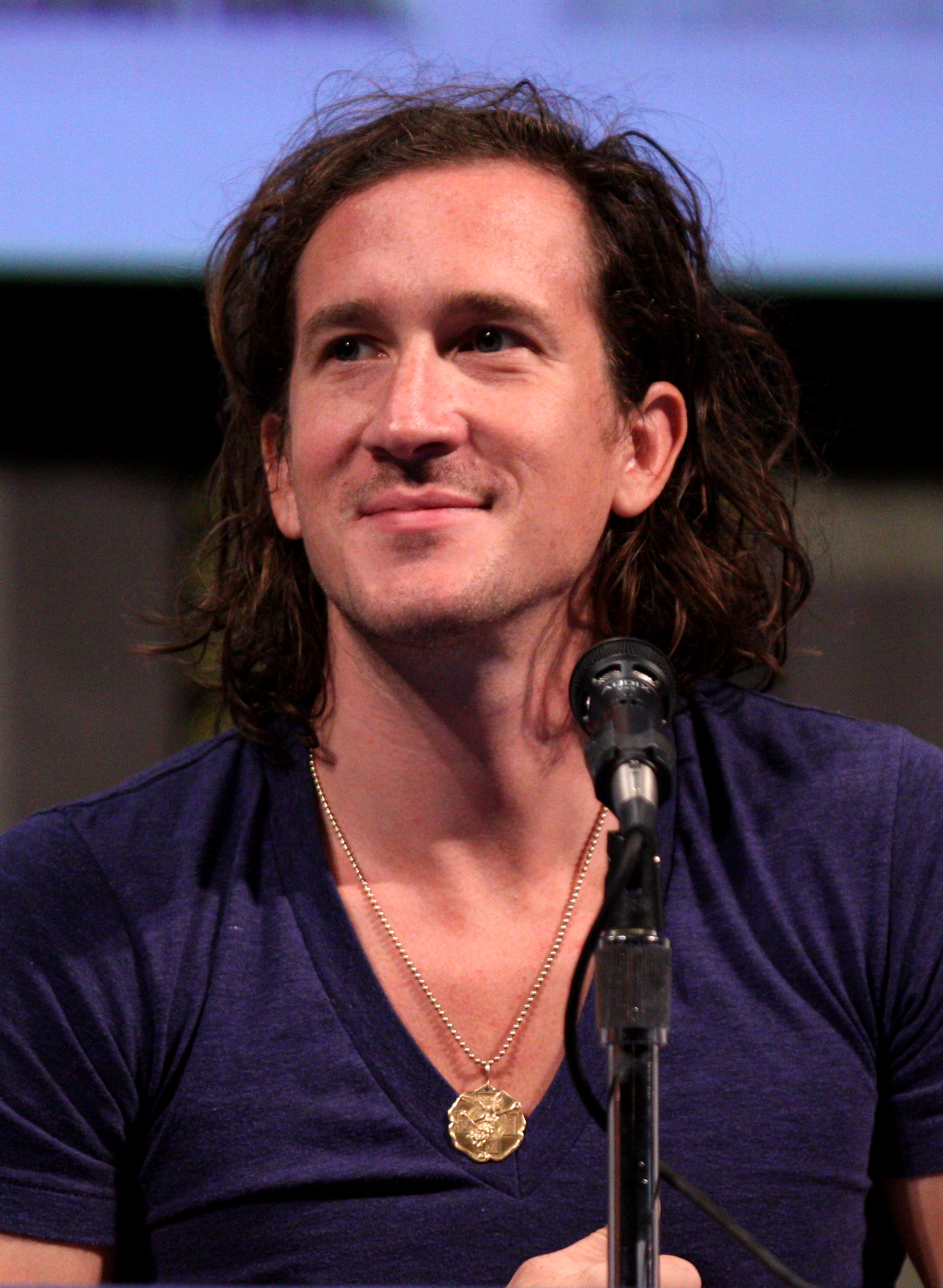
- Brennan in 2011
- Born: April 23, 1978 (age 48); Mount Prospect, Illinois, U.S.
- Education: Loyola University Chicago (BA)
- Occupations: Screenwriter; producer; director; actor
- Spouse: Trilby Glover (m. 2016)
- Children: 2

Ian Brennan (born April 23, 1978) is an American screenwriter, director and actor. He is known for creating the American television shows Glee (2009–2015), Scream Queens (2015–2016), The Politician (2019–2020), and Monster (2022–present).

== Early life ==
Brennan is the son of John and Charman Brennan. He is of Irish and Italian descent and his father was a Paulist priest. Brennan spent four years at Prospect High School in Mount Prospect, Illinois, during the mid-1990s, and was a member of the school show choir, which he did not find particularly enjoyable. He was friends with actress Jennifer Morrison. Brennan aspired to be an actor, and as his high school musical director was also the show choir director, he joined the choir to enhance his chance of being cast in musical productions. Brennan credits his high school theatre director John Marquette for inspiring him to act. The character Will Schuester in Glee is partially based on Marquette. Brennan went on to study theatre at Loyola University Chicago. He graduated in 2000, and acted for a time in Chicago, studying at The Second City Training Center and working with the Steppenwolf and Goodman Theatres, before moving to New York City to continue his acting career. He has performed in off-Broadway plays at the Vineyard, Playwrights Horizons and MCC Theatres. His early writing experience was limited to sketch pieces in high school and college plays he describes as "terrible".

== Career ==
Brennan conceived the idea for Glee based on his own experience as a member of the Prospect High School show choir. He explained: "I find it interesting that there is something in everybody, a longing for something transcendent, particularly in a place like Mt. Prospect, a place that's very suburban and normal and plain. Even in places like that, there's this desire to shine. That's fascinating and very funny to me, especially when people try to accomplish this through show choir – which, to me, is inherently a little ridiculous." Brennan was inspired by these events, and in August 2005, purchased a copy of Screenwriting for Dummies and wrote the first draft of Glee, initially envisioned as a film rather than a television series. He completed the script in 2005, but could not generate interest in the project for several years.

Mike Novick, a television producer and a friend of Brennan's from Los Angeles, was a member of the same gym as writer and producer Ryan Murphy, and gave him a copy of Brennan's script. Murphy had been in a show choir while at college, and as such felt he could relate to the script. Murphy and his Nip/Tuck colleague Brad Falchuk suggested that Glee be adapted to a television show format. The script was entirely re-written, and was picked up by Fox within 15 hours of being received. Murphy and Falchuk became the show's executive producers and showrunners, while Brennan is a co-executive producer and Novick is a producer. Brennan, Falchuk and Murphy wrote all of the show's episodes in the first two seasons, and were nominated for two 2010 Writers Guild of America Awards for Glee, with nominations in the Best Comedy Series and Best New Series categories. Glee concluded after its sixth season, which aired in early 2015.

Brennan, Falchuk and Murphy created Scream Queens, a comedy-horror series set on a college campus and in a hospital, that aired from September 2015 to December 2016, and starred Emma Roberts, Ariana Grande, Lea Michele, Keke Palmer, Abigail Breslin, and Jamie Lee Curtis. In 2022, Brennan and Murphy created the biographical crime series Monster, which was then conceived as a limited series based on the serial killer Jeffrey Dahmer, but later became an anthology series with the announcement of its second season.

== Personal life ==
Brennan lives in both New York City and Los Angeles. He married actress Trilby Glover in September 2016 and the couple have two children, Blaise (born in April 2016) and Juno (born in August 2018).

== Credits ==
=== Film and television ===
Year	Title	Format	Role	Notes
2000	Early Edition	Television series	Valet	Episode "Everybody Goes to Rick's"
2000	Too Much Flesh	Film	Bert	
2002	No Sleep 'til Madison	Film	Dave	
2006	Flourish	Film	Dr. Carter Kaufman	
2006	Growing	Short film	Writer, actor (Jeremy)	
2006	Save the Last Dance 2	Direct-to-DVD film	Franz	
2007	I Think I Love My Wife	Film	Department Store Salesman #1	
2007	Law & Order: Criminal Intent	Television series	Lance Morein	Episode "Renewal"
2007	CSI: NY	Television series	Joe Silver	Episode "Buzzkill"
2008	New Amsterdam	Television series	Chris Duncan	Episode "Keep the Change"
2009	Staten Island	Film	Hippie in Tree	
2009	Infamous	Video game	Voice	
2009–2015	Glee	Television series	Co-creator, writer, narrator, director	
2011	The Glee Project	TV program	Judge	
2014	Cooties	Film	Writer, actor (Vice Principal Simms)	
2015–2016	Scream Queens	Television series	Co-creator, writer, director	
2018	LA to Vegas	Television series	Writer	Episode: "#PilotFight"
2019–2020	The Politician	Television series	Co-creator, writer, director	
2020	Hollywood	Limited series	Co-creator and writer	
2020	Ratched	Television series	Writer	
2021	Halston	Limited series	Writer	
2022–present	Monster	Anthology series	Co-creator, writer, director	
2022–present	The Watcher	Television series	Co-creator and writer	

=== Theatre ===
Year	Title	Role	Theatre
1999	Saturday Night	Gene Gorman	O'Rourke Center for the Performing Arts, Chicago
1999	Finian's Rainbow	Performer	Marriott Theatre, Chicago
2005–2006	The Man in the White Suit	Performer	Martel Theatre, Poughkeepsie, New York and Beckett Theatre New York City
