= Thomas Newman =

American composer and conductor (born 1955)

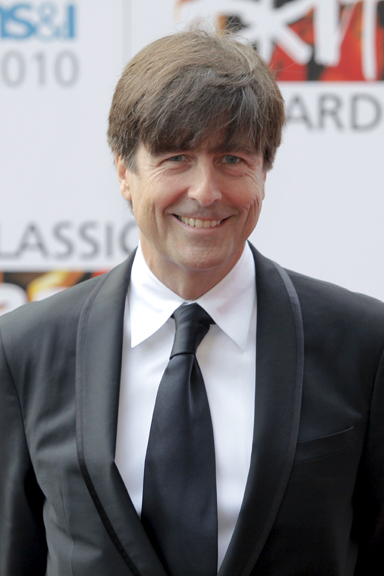
- Newman at 2010 Classic Brit Awards
- Born: Thomas Montgomery Newman; October 20, 1955 (age 70); Los Angeles, California, U.S.
- Occupations: Composer; conductor; orchestrator
- Years active: 1979–present
- Spouse: Ann Marie Zirbes (m. 2001)
- Children: 3, including Julia Newman
- Father: Alfred Newman
- Relatives: David Newman (brother); Maria Newman (sister); Randy Newman (cousin); Joey Newman (cousin); Lionel Newman (uncle); Emil Newman (uncle)

Thomas Montgomery Newman (born October 20, 1955) is an American composer, conductor, and orchestrator. He is best known for his film scores, earning accolades of six Grammy Awards, an Emmy Award, two BAFTA Film Awards, and 15 Academy Award nominations.

In a career that has spanned over four decades, he has scored numerous films including The Player (1992), The Shawshank Redemption (1994), Little Women (1994), Meet Joe Black (1998), American Beauty and The Green Mile (both 1999), Pay It Forward (2000), In the Bedroom (2001), Road to Perdition and White Oleander (both 2002), Finding Nemo (2003) and its sequel Finding Dory (2016), Lemony Snicket's A Series of Unfortunate Events (2004), Cinderella Man (2005), WALL-E (2008), the James Bond films Skyfall (2012) and Spectre (2015), Bridge of Spies (2015), 1917 (2019), and Elemental (2023).

In television, Newman has composed music for the HBO drama series Six Feet Under (2001), the 2003 miniseries Angels in America, as well as the Netflix biographical crime drama Monsters: The Lyle and Erik Menendez Story (2024). In the lattermost, he co-composed with his daughter Julia Newman. He has collaborated with directors such as Robert Altman, Jon Avnet, Martin Brest, Frank Darabont, Todd Field, John Lee Hancock, John Madden, Sam Mendes, Andrew Stanton, and Steven Soderbergh.

== Early life and education ==
Born in Los Angeles, Thomas Montgomery Newman is the youngest son of composer Alfred Newman (1900–1970), who won the Academy Award for Best Original Score nine times, and Martha Louis Montgomery (1920–2005). He is a member of a film-scoring dynasty in Hollywood that includes his father Alfred, older brother David Newman, younger sister Maria Newman, uncles Lionel Newman and Emil Newman, cousin Randy Newman, and his first cousin once removed, Joey Newman. His paternal grandparents were Russian Jewish immigrants, and his mother was from Mississippi.

During their upbringing, Martha Newman took her sons to violin lessons in the San Fernando Valley every weekend.

Newman later studied composition and orchestration for two years at the University of Southern California, before transferring to Yale University, where he graduated with a Bachelor of Arts in 1977 and a Master of Music in 1978. While at Yale, he met composer Stephen Sondheim, who became an early mentor.

== Career ==
=== 1983–1992 ===
At first, Newman was more interested in musical theater than in film composition, working with Sondheim in Broadway plays. Lionel, who succeeded Alfred as music director for 20th Century Fox, gave Thomas his first scoring assignment on a 1979 episode of the series The Paper Chase. In 1983, John Williams, who was a friend of both Alfred and Lionel, invited Newman to work on Return of the Jedi, orchestrating the scene in which Darth Vader dies. Afterward Newman met producer Scott Rudin in New York City and Rudin invited him to compose the score for Reckless (1984). Newman said that he thought "it was a tough job, at first" for requiring him to "develop vocabularies and a sense of procedure", only getting comfortable with writing scores "and not fraudulent in my efforts" after eight years. In 1992, Newman composed the scores for The Player and Scent of a Woman.

=== 1994–1999 ===
In 1994, he received his first Academy Award nominations with the scores for The Shawshank Redemption and Little Women. He also scored The War. In 1996, he scored Unstrung Heroes, receiving yet another Oscar nomination. In 1998, he scored The Horse Whisperer as well as Meet Joe Black. In 1999, Newman composed the score to American Beauty, created using mainly percussion instruments; this was the first of several collaborations with director Sam Mendes. Newman believed the score helped move the film along without disturbing the "moral ambiguity" of the script, saying "It was a real delicate balancing act in terms of what music worked to preserve that.". He received a fourth Oscar nomination for this score, and although he lost again (to John Corigliano for The Red Violin), he did receive a Grammy and a BAFTA.

=== 2000–2011 ===
His critical and commercial success continued in the years to follow, which included scores for films directed by celebrated independent filmmakers such as Steven Soderbergh (Erin Brockovich), and Todd Field (In the Bedroom). He was nominated consecutively for a further three Academy Awards, for Road to Perdition (2002; his second collaboration with Sam Mendes), Finding Nemo (2003), and Lemony Snicket's A Series of Unfortunate Events (2004). However, he lost on each occasion, to Elliot Goldenthal (for Frida), Howard Shore (for The Lord of the Rings: The Return of the King), and Jan A. P. Kaczmarek (for Finding Neverland).

In 2006, he teamed once again with Todd Field for Little Children and Steven Soderbergh for The Good German (and was nominated for latter). At the Oscar ceremony, he appeared in the opening segment by Errol Morris, who jokingly stated that Newman had been nominated for and failed to win an Oscar eight times. Newman replied: "No, I've failed seven but this will be my eighth", and indeed, he again lost, this time to Gustavo Santaolalla for Babel.

His first score since The Good German was for Towelhead. In 2008, he scored the animated film WALL-E, collaborating for the second time with director Andrew Stanton (with the first collaboration being Finding Nemo). The film won the Academy Award for Best Animated Feature (as had Nemo). Newman received two Oscar nominations: one for Best Original Score, and another for Best Original Song for "Down to Earth", which he co-wrote with Peter Gabriel. He was nominated in the Original Score category with two other veteran composers, James Newton Howard and Danny Elfman, both of whom have also been nominated for several Oscars but each time unsuccessfully. Newman lost both the score and song nominations to A. R. Rahman for his work on Slumdog Millionaire. He and Peter Gabriel did however win a Grammy for "Down to Earth".

In 2008, he also scored Revolutionary Road, a further collaboration with Mendes. In 2009, he scored Brothers (the remake of the Susanne Bier film). In 2011, he scored The Help, The Debt, The Iron Lady, and The Adjustment Bureau.

=== 2012–present ===
In 2012, Newman scored The Best Exotic Marigold Hotel, a second collaboration with John Madden after The Debt. He also scored the 23rd James Bond movie Skyfall, released on the film franchise's 50th anniversary. His work on this film earned him his eleventh Oscar nomination and a second BAFTA win. During 2013, he scored Side Effects (working again with director Steven Soderbergh) and Saving Mr. Banks. The latter score was very well received by film music critics, earning Newman BAFTA and Oscar nominations for the second consecutive year, both of which he lost to Steven Price for Gravity.

Newman's 2014 projects included The Judge and Get on Up. In 2015, he scored The Second Best Exotic Marigold Hotel, marking the first time Newman has scored a sequel to a film he also wrote the score for. Also that year, Newman returned to score the 24th James Bond movie Spectre, the sequel to Skyfall and a continuation of his longtime collaboration with Sam Mendes. He also worked with Steven Spielberg for Bridge of Spies, marking Newman's first collaboration with Spielberg and the first Spielberg film not to feature a musical score from his long-time composer John Williams, since the production of The Color Purple in 1985. For his score on Bridge of Spies, Newman garnered additional Oscar and Grammy nominations.

In 2016, Newman scored Passengers, for which he received his 14th Oscar nomination. Three years later, Newman reunited with Sam Mendes for his war film 1917, for which Newman received his 6th BAFTA and 15th Oscar nominations.

Newman likes to vary the instrumentation in his scores, ranging from full orchestra to percussion-only music. He is also fond of incorporating unusual instruments such as the zither, hurdy-gurdy, psaltery and hammered dulcimer, or unexpected sounds, like Aboriginal chants and the chirping of cicadas. The composer declared that he has "an interest in mundane experimentation."

== Awards and nominations ==
Newman has been nominated for fifteen Academy Awards, tying him with fellow composer Alex North for the most nominations without a win. He has also been nominated for four Golden Globes, and has won two BAFTAs, six Grammys and an Emmy Award. Newman was honored with the Richard Kirk award at the 2000 BMI Film and TV Awards. The award is given annually to a composer who has made significant contributions to film and television music. His achievements have contributed to the Newmans being the most nominated Academy Award extended family, with a collective 92 nominations in various music categories.
