= List of horror films of 2026 =

This is a list of horror films that were released in 2026. This list includes films that are classified as horror as well as other subgenres. They are listed in alphabetical order.

== Highest-grossing horror films of 2026 ==
† Indicates films currently in theatrical release in the week commencing 20 November 2026.

Highest-grossing horror films of 2026
Rank	Title	Distributor	Worldwide gross	Ref.
1	Obsession	Focus Features	$524.5 million	
2	Resident Evil	Sony Pictures Releasing	$419.4 million	
3	Backrooms	A24	$400.4 million	
4	Scary Movie	Paramount Pictures	$231.9 million	
5	Scream 7	Paramount Pictures	$213.8 million	
6	Insidious: Out of the Further	Sony Pictures Releasing	$171.7 million	
7	Clayface	Warner Bros. Pictures	$126.2 million	
8	Other Mommy	Universal Pictures	$120.9 million	
9	Send Help	20th Century Studios	$94 million	
10	Lee Cronin's The Mummy	Warner Bros. Pictures	$90.6 million	

=== Box office records ===
- Obsession became Focus Features' highest-grossing domestic release in its history, and is one of the most profitable in history having been produced on a $750,000 budget.
  - The film became the first film since E.T. the Extra-Terrestrial (1982) to see ticket sales increase in its second and third weekends respectively outside of the holiday season.
  - The film surpassed The Blair Witch Project (1999) to become the highest-grossing film festival acquisition of all time.
  - It surpassed Sinners (2025) to become the highest-grossing original Hollywood live-action film of the decade.
  - The film surpassed Enter the Dragon (1973) to become the highest-grossing low-budget film with a production budget under $1 million.
- Backrooms became A24's biggest opening weekend in its history with $118 million globally.
  - Backrooms became A24's highest-grossing film to date, overtaking Marty Supreme (2025).
  - Director Kane Parsons was 20 years old at the time of the film's release, making him the youngest filmmaker to reach number one at the United States box office. The previous record holder, Josh Trank, was 27 years old when his film Chronicle (2012) was released.
- The Scary Movie film series surpassed $1 billion with the release of Scary Movie 6. It became the first parody film franchise to surpass $1 billion.
- The Scream film series became the sixth horror film franchise to surpass $1 billion with the release of Scream 7.
  - Scream 7 became the highest-grossing film in the series, surpassing Scream (1996).
- By November 2026, Clayface had grossed approximately $126.2 million worldwide, surpassing the $77.3 million earned by The Substance (2024) and becoming the highest-grossing body horror film to date, unadjusted for inflation. Its worldwide gross also exceeded the theatrical earnings of Together (2025), which grossed approximately $34.6 million, The Fly (1986), which grossed approximately $60.6 million, and Slither (2006), which grossed approximately $12.9 million.

== Films ==
Horror films released in 2026
Title	Director	Cast	Country	Subgenre	Ref.
28 Years Later: The Bone Temple	Nia DaCosta	Ralph Fiennes, Jack O'Connell, Chi Lewis-Parry, Alfie Williams, Erin Kellyman	United Kingdom; United States	Post-apocalyptic horror	
402 Haunted Korean Hospital	Anggy Umbara	Arbani Yasiz, Saputra Kori, Diandra Agatha, Elang El Gibran, Lea Ciarachel	Indonesia	Found footage Supernatural Horror	
99/66	M. S. Moorthy	Rachitha Mahalakshmi, M. S. Moorthy, P. Sabari, Rohinth Chellappa, Swetha Dorathy	India	Horror thriller	
A Corpse in Kensington	Brian Patrick Butler	Derrick Acosta, Savannah Porter, Alex Chernow, Michael Madsen, Kimberly Weinberger, Sutheshna Mani, Ryan Bollman, Vinny Curran	United States	Psychological horror	
Above & Below	Jesse V. Johnson	Laura Marano, Antonio Banderas, Christina Ochoa, Timothy V. Murphy, Louis Mandylor, Jess Liaudin	United States	Action Horror Thriller	
Act One	Sophia Takal	Ella Beatty, Ari Graynor, Nate Mann, Elizabeth Reaser, Sinclair Daniel, Robert Sean Leonard, Tavi Gevinson	United States	Psychological thriller	
American Dollhouse	John Valley	Richard C. Jones, Hailley Lauren, Danielle Evon Ploeger	United States	Horror thriller	
Ancestral Beasts	Tim Riedel	Morgan Holmstrom, Darla Contois, Gail Maurice, Asivak Koostachin	Canada	Horror	
And Her Body Was Never Found	Polaris Banks	Mor Cohen, Polaris Banks, Grae Drake	United States	Comedy drama horror	
Andhar	Raihan Rafi	Siam Ahmed, Nazifa Tushi, Chanchal Chowdhury, Mostafa Monwar, Farrukh Ahmed Rehan, Afsana Mimi, Gazi Rakayet	Bangladesh	Supernatural horror	
Apocalypse Z: New World	Carles Torrens	Carlos Alcaide, Julia Martínez, Mario Mayo, Mónica López	Spain	Post-apocalyptic Horror	
Attack of the Killer Tomatoes: Organic Intelligence	David Ferino	David Koechner, John Astin, Dan Bakkedahl, Daniel Roebuck, Catherine Corcoran, Paul Bates, Vernee Watson, Eric Roberts	United States	Comedy horror	
Backrooms	Kane Parsons	Chiwetel Ejiofor, Renate Reinsve, Mark Duplass, Finn Bennett, Lukita Maxwell, Avan Jogia	United States	Science fiction horror	
Bad Voodoo	Andrew Adler, Andre Hepburn	John Fiore, Manny Perez, Cristina Moody, Charlie Alejandro, Justin Genna, Alex Joseph Pires	United States	Horror	
Bagworm	Oliver Bernsen	Peter Falls, Michelle Ortiz, Robbie Arnett	United States	Comedy drama horror	
Beware Boiúna	Mike P. Nelson	Kiana Madeira, Logan Marshall-Green, Jessica Rothe	United States	Monster Horror	
Bhooth Bangla	Priyadarshan	Akshay Kumar, Paresh Rawal, Rajpal Yadav , Tabu, Wamiqa Gabbi	India	Comedy horror	
Black Box	Steven Quale	Betsy-Blue English, Georgi S. Georgiev, Georgina Leonidas, Vaughn Johseph, Weronika Rosati, Cel Spellman	United States	Horror Thriller	
Black Zombie	Maya Annik Bedward	Mambo Labelle Déese Botanica, Zandashé Brown, Tananarive Due	Canada	Documentary horror	
Breeder	Alex Goyette	Daniel Doheny, Dot-Marie Jones, Maddie Phillips, Tanaya Beatty	Canada, United States	Horror thriller	
Buddy	Casper Kelly	Cristin Milioti, Topher Grace, Keegan-Michael Key, Michael Shannon, Patton Oswalt	United States	Horror comedy	
Bunker Heights	Drew Fortier	Drew Fortier, Hannah Fierman, Violent J, Vinnie Dombroski, David Ellefson	United States	Horror comedy	
Bury the Devil	Adam O'Brien	Emmanuelle Lussier-Martinez, Jason Cavalier, Dawn Ford	Canada, United States	Horror Thriller	
Cat Cam	Sara Werner	Nug the Cat, Cronin Cullen, Colleen Evanson, Bry Gallagher	United States	Found footage Horror	
Cerita Lila	Bobby Prasetyo	Erwanto Alphadullah, Kiki Fabia, Dennis Kumar	Indonesia	Psychological Horror	
Chum	Jonathan Zuck	Alice Eve, Eric Michael Cole, Jim Klock	United States	Thriller	
Clayface	James Watkins	Tom Rhys Harries, Naomi Ackie, Max Minghella	United States	Body horror	
Cold Storage	Jonny Campbell	Georgina Campbell, Joe Keery, Sosie Bacon, Vanessa Redgrave, Lesley Manville, Liam Neeson	France, United States	Comedy horror	
Colony	Yeon Sang-ho	Jun Ji-hyun, Ji Chang-wook, Koo Kyo-hwan, Shin Hyun-been	South Korea	Action thriller zombie	
Corporate Retreat	Aaron Fisher	Odeya Rush, Zion Moreno, Ashton Sanders, Alan Ruck, Rosanna Arquette	United States	Horror thriller	
Crawlers	Angel Gómez Hernández	Matilda Lutz, Gregg Sulkin, William Miller, Melina Matthews	United States	Horror Thriller	
Crayon Shin-chan the Movie: Spooky! My Yokai Vacation	Masaki Watanabe	Yumiko Kobayashi, Miki Narahashi, Toshiyuki Morikawa, Satomi Kōrogi, Chō	Japan	Animated adventure fantasy comedy horror	
Cursed Meme	Kan Yamamoto	Ikoi Hayase, Mamoru Hagiwara, Sono Hiramatsu	Japan	Supernatural Horror Thriller	
Danur: The Last Chapter	Awi Suryadi	Prilly Latuconsina, Lewis Robert, Dian Nitami, Dito Darmawan, Zee Asadel	Indonesia	Horror	
Dark	Kalyan K. Jegan	Ajay Karthi, Anchana Nethrun	India	Horror	
Dark Hollow	Daniel Byers	June Shreiner, David Garelik, J. Stephen Brantley, Brennon Weese Ian Deighan, Jonathan Spivey, Sean Michael Wilkinson, Sharon Murray	United States	Horror	
Dead Eyes	Richard E. Williams	Ana Thu Nguyen, Mischa Heywood, Stephen Phillips	Australia	Horror	
Deep Water	Renny Harlin	Aaron Eckhart, Ben Kingsley	Australia, United States	Disaster horror	
Demonte Colony 3	R. Ajay Gnanamuthu	Arulnithi, Priya Bhavani Shankar	India	Supernatural horror thriller	
Disclosure Day	Steven Spielberg	Emily Blunt, Josh O'Connor, Colin Firth, Eve Hewson, Colman Domingo	United States	Science fiction mystery	
Do Not Enter	Marc Klasfeld	Jake Manley, Adeline Rudolph, Francesca Reale, Laurence O'Fuarain, Nicholas Hamilton, Javier Botet, Kai Caster, Shane Paul McGhie	United States	Horror thriller	
Don't Come Out	Victoria Linares Villegas	Cecile van Welie, Camila Issa, Gabriela Cortés, Camila Santana, Mariela Guerrero	Dominican Republic	Coming-of-age Drama Horror	
Drag	Raviv Ullman, Greg Yagolnitzer	Lizzy Caplan, Lucy DeVito, John Stamos, Christine Ko	United States	Comedy horror thriller	
DreamQuil	Alex Prager	Elizabeth Banks, John C. Reilly, Sofia Boutella, Juliette Lewis, Kathryn Newton	United States, United Kingdom	Psychological thriller	
Ella Arcangel: Ballad of Tooth and Claw	Mervin Malonzo	Bianca Umali	Philippines	Adult animated urban fantasy supernatural horror	
Evil Dead Burn	Sébastien Vaniček	Souheila Yacoub, Hunter Doohan, Luciane Buchanan, Tandi Wright	United States	Supernatural horror	
Evil Dress	Jacob Santana	Belén Rueda, Vera Centenera	Spain	Supernatural horror	
Faces of Death	Daniel Goldhaber	Barbie Ferreira, Dacre Montgomery, Josie Totah, Charli XCX, Jermaine Fowler, Aaron Holliday	United States	Horror	
Family Movie	Kevin Bacon, Kyra Sedgwick	Nathaniel Woolsey, Kevin Bacon, Sosie Bacon	United States	Comedy horror	
Forbidden Fruits	Meredith Alloway	Lili Reinhart, Lola Tung, Victoria Pedretti, Alexandra Shipp, Emma Chamberlain, Gabrielle Union	United States	Horror	
Fourth Floor	L. R. Sundarapandi	Aari Arujunan, Deepshika, Pavithra	India	Psychological horror thriller	
Freaks Part II	Adam Stein, Zach Lipovsky	Amanda Crew, Lorelei Olivia Mote, Lili Taylor, Reznor Allen, Audrianna Lico, Stephen Tobolowsky	Canada	Science Fiction Horror	
Gabu	Shinsuke Kurimoto	TBA	Japan	Horror thriller	
Gale: Yellow Brick Road	Daniel Alexander	Chloë Crump, Laura Kay Bailey, Hassan Taj	United Kingdom	Dark fantasy	
Ghost Board	Chanathip Wongpoltree	Ongart Jeamcharoenpornkul, Panisara Rikulsurakan, Win Sakulsangprapha, Nattawat Sumploy, Neenara Boonnitipaisit, Pawat Ketsrisakda	Thailand	Horror Thriller	
Ghost in the Cell	Joko Anwar	Abimana Aryasatya, Almanzo Konoralma, Aming Sugandhi	Indonesia	Horror comedy	
Godzilla Minus Zero	Takashi Yamazaki	Ryunosuke Kamiki, Minami Hamabe	Japan	Monster	
Grind	Ed Dougherty, Brea Grant, Chelsea Stardust	Mercedes Mason, Christopher Rodriguez Marquette, Rob Huebel	United States	Science fiction comedy horror	
Grizzly Night	Burke Doeren	Brec Bassinger, Ali Skovbye, Jack Griffo, Charles Esten, Oded Fehr, Joel Johnstone, Josh Zuckerman, Matt Lintz	United States	Survival thriller	
Hallowarrior	Ben Sottak	Milly Shapiro, Ajani Russell, A. J. Bowen, Shannyn Sossamon	United States	Horror Thriller	
Haunted 3D: Ghosts of the Past	Vikram Bhatt, Manish P. Chavan	Mahaakshay Chakraborty, Chetna Pande, Gaurav Bajpai, Hemant Pandey, Shruti Prakash, Praneet Bhatt, Mannveer Choudharry	India	Supernatural horror	
Haunted Heist	Lil Rel Howery	Lil Rel Howery, Tiffany Haddish	United States	Horror Comedy	
Her Private Hell	Nicolas Winding Refn	Sophie Thatcher, Charles Melton, Kristine Froseth, Havana Rose Liu, Diego Calva	United States, Denmark	Horror thriller	
Hive	Felipe Vargas	Xochitl Gomez, Aaron Dominguez, Zenobia Kloppers, Victoria Firsova, Tanya van Graan, Jenny le Roux, Thulani Nzonzo	Canada	Horror thriller	
Hokum	Damian McCarthy	Adam Scott, Peter Coonan, David Willmot	United States	Supernatural horror	
Home Bodies	Casey Walker	Ian Ho, Emma Ho, Ess Hödlmoser	Canada	Science Fiction Horror	
Honey	Karuna Kumar	Naveen Chandra, Divi Vadthya, Divya Pillai	India	Psychological horror thriller	
Hope	Na Hong-jin	Hwang Jung-min, Zo In-sung, Jung Ho-yeon, Alicia Vikander, Michael Fassbender, Taylor Russell, Cameron Britton	South Korea	Science fiction thriller	
House of Ka	Josie Eli Herman	Allison Megroet, Jeffrey Shawn Miller, Yesmeen Mikhail	United States	Horror mystery	
Hungry	James Nunn	Madison Davenport, Tracey Bonner, Joaquim de Almeida, Michel Curiel, Samantha Coughlan, Olivia Bernstone, Jim Meskimen, River Codack	United Kingdom	Survival thriller horror	
Huwag Kang Titingin	Frasco Mortis	Sofia Pablo, Allen Ansay, Marco Masa, Kira Balinger, Michael Sager	Philippines	Horror	
Ice Cream Man	Eli Roth	Ari Millen, Benjamin Byron Davis, Karen Cliche, Dylan Hawco, Sarah Abbott	United States	Horror	
Imposters	Caleb Phillips	Jessica Rothe, Charlie Barnett, Yul Vazquez	United States	Drama horror science fiction	
Infirmary	Nicholas Pineda	Paul Syre Lee, Mark Anthony Williams, Danielle Kennedy, Corinna Wagner-Smith	United States	Found footage Psychological Horror	
Insidious: Out of the Further	Jacob Chase	Brandon Perea, Lin Shaye, Amelia Eve, Maisie Richardson-Sellers, Sam Spruell, Laura Gordon	United States	Supernatural horror	
Iron Lung	Markiplier	Mark Fischbach, Caroline Rose Kaplan, Seán McLoughlin, David Szymanski, Elle LaMont, Troy Baker, Elsie Lovelock, Isaac McKee	United States	Science fiction horror	
Ithaqua	Casey Walker	Luke Hemsworth, Kevin Durand, Michael Pitt, Craig Lauzon, Leenah Robinson	Canada	Horror	
Jambi	George Kora	TBA	India	Apocalyptic horror	
Kabanda	Rehan Chaudhary	Shyam Nair, Tarjanee Bhadla, Brinda Trivedi	India	Supernatural thriller	
Killer Whale	Jo-Anne Brechin	Virginia Gardner, Mel Jarnson, Mitchell Hope	Australia	Comedy horror action	
Kraken	Pål Øie	Sara Khorami, Mikkel Bratt Silset, Ingvild Holthe Bygdnes, Øyvind Brandtzæg, Jenny Evensen	Norway	Monster	
Lee Cronin's The Mummy	Lee Cronin	Jack Reynor, Laia Costa, Verónica Falcón, May Calamawy	United States	Supernatural horror	
Levitating	Wregas Bhanuteja	Angga Yunanda, Maudy Ayunda, Anggun, Bryan Domani, Chicco Kurniawan	Indonesia	Supernatural drama	
Leviticus	Adrian Chiarella	Joe Bird, Stacy Clausen, Mia Wasikowska, Jeremy Blewitt, Ewen Leslie, Davida McKenzie	Australia	Horror	
Lockbox	Daniel Stamm	Carla Gugino, Lou Taylor Pucci, Katharine Isabelle, Aedan Edwards	United States	Supernatural Horror	
Los Vampires	Craig Mitchell	Henry Ian Cusick, Thomas Kretschmann, Daniela Couso, Jorge Diaz, Oscar Nuñez, Jefferson Mays	United States	Horror Thriller	
Monitor	Matt Black, Ryan Polly	Brittany O'Grady, Taz Skylar, Ines Høysæter Asserson	United States	Horror	
Motherwitch	Minos Papas	Margarita Zachariou, Miltos Yerolemou, Danae Katsameni, Jason Hughes, Athos Antoniou, Sifis Katsoulakis, Marina Makris	Cyprus, North Macedonia, United States	Gothic folk horror	
Mum, I'm Alien Pregnant	THUNDERLIPS	Hannah Lynch, Yvette Parsons, Arlo Green, Jackie van Beek	New Zealand	Comedy horror	
Never After Dark	Dave Boyle	Moeka Hoshi, Kurumi Inagaki, Kento Kaku	Japan	Horror	
Nightborn	Hanna Bergholm	Seidi Haarla, Rupert Grint	Finland, Lithuania, France, United Kingdom	Dark fantasy	
Obsession	Curry Barker	Michael Johnston, Inde Navarrette, Cooper Tomlinson, Megan Lawless, Andy Richter	United States	Supernatural horror	
Onslaught	Adam Wingard	Adria Arjona, Dan Stevens, Eric Wareheim, Reginald VelJohnson, Michael Biehn, Alex Pereira, Drew Starkey, Rebecca Hall	United States	Slasher Action	
Other Mommy	Rob Savage	Jessica Chastain, Jay Duplass, Dichen Lachman, Sean Kaufman, Karen Allen	United States	Supernatural horror	
Over Your Dead Body	Jorma Taccone	Samara Weaving, Jason Segel, Timothy Olyphant, Juliette Lewis, Paul Guilfoyle, Keith Jardine	United States	Action horror	
Pacífico	Gonzalo Gutierrez	Natacha Caravia, Luis E. Langlemey, Constanza Cabrera	Argentina, Columbia	Science fiction horror	
Passenger	André Øvredal	Melissa Leo, Lou Llobell, Jacob Scipio	United States	Horror	
Pee Mak	Victor Villanueva	Bea Binene, Wilbert Ross, Vandolph	Philippines	Folk horror Comedy	
Phi Phong: The Blood Demon	Quoc Trung Do	Doan Minh Anh, Diep Bao Ngoc, Nina Padovan	Vietnam	Folk horror	
Pinocchio Unstrung	Rhys Frake-Waterfield	Robert Englund, Richard Brake, Cameron Bell, Jessica Balmer, Jack Art Gray, Peter DeSouza-Feighoney	United Kingdom	Slasher	
Ponderosa	Rob Rice	Jack Dylan Grazer, Alexis Bledel, Bill Camp	United States	Comedy drama horror mystery	
Poon	Adolfo Alix Jr.	Ronaldo Valdez, Gina Pareño, Jaclyn Jose, Janice de Belen, Lotlot de Leon, Ara Mina	Philippines	Horror Drama	
Project Sacrifice	JeroPoint	Callista Arum, Kiesha Alvaro, Karina Suwandhi	Indonesia	Horror	
Psycho Killer	Gavin Polone	Georgina Campbell, James Preston Rogers, Grace Dove, Logan Miller, Malcolm McDowell	United States, Germany	Horror thriller	
Ready or Not 2: Here I Come	Matt Bettinelli-Olpin, Tyler Gillett	Samara Weaving, Kathryn Newton, Sarah Michelle Gellar, Shawn Hatosy, Néstor Carbonell, Kevin Durand, Olivia Cheng, David Cronenberg, Elijah Wood	United States	Comedy horror	
Resident Evil	Zach Cregger	Austin Abrams, Paul Walter Hauser, Zach Cherry, Kali Reis	United States	Zombie Horror	
Return of the Living Dead	Steve Wolsh	Devon Sawa, Casimere Jollette, Kynlee Heiman, Alexander Ward	United States	Zombie	
Return to Silent Hill	Christophe Gans	Jeremy Irvine, Hannah Emily Anderson	United States	Supernatural psychological horror	
River	Joshua Giuliano	Jane Levy, Jessica Rothe, Abigail Esmena	United States	Slasher	
Rock Springs	Vera Miao	Kelly Marie Tran, Benedict Wong, Jimmy O. Yang	United States, Canada	Horror	
Rosario	Roni Benaid	Aubrey Caraan, Lance Carr, Jairus Aquino, Yumi Garcia, Meg Imperial	Philippines	Family Horror	
Rosie: The Saffron Chapter	Vishal Mishra	Arbaaz Khan, Tanishaa, Shivin Narang	India	Horror mystery	
Saccharine	Natalie Erika James	Midori Francis, Madeleine Madden, Danielle Macdonald	Australia	Horror	
Salmokji: Whispering Water	Lee Sang-min	Kim Hye-yoon, Lee Jong-won, Kim Jun-han, Kim Young-sung, Oh Dong-min, Yoon Jae-chan, Jang Da-ah	South Korea	Horror	
Satan – The Dark	Manikandan Ramalingam	Fredrick John, Ayraa	India	Supernatural horror	
Scary Movie	Michael Tiddes	Anna Faris, Regina Hall, Marlon Wayans, Shawn Wayans, Jon Abrahams, Lochlyn Munro, Cheri Oteri, Dave Sheridan, Chris Elliott	United States	Comedy horror	
Scream 7	Kevin Williamson	Neve Campbell, Courteney Cox, Isabel May, Celeste O'Connor, Asa Germann, Mckenna Grace, Sam Rechner, Mason Gooding, Anna Camp	United States	Slasher	
Send Help	Sam Raimi	Rachel McAdams, Dylan O'Brien	United States	Black comedy survival thriller	
Sender	Russell Goldman	Britt Lower, Rhea Seehorn, Jamie Lee Curtis, Anna Baryshnikov, David Dastmalchian, Utkarsh Ambudkar, Mike Mitchell	United States	Psychological thriller	
Sinner Supper Club	Nora Kaye, Daisy Rosario	Nora Kaye, Elise Kibler, Ashil Lee	United States	Horror comedy	
Sister	Jin Sung-moon	Jung Ji-so, Lee Soo-hyuk, Cha Joo-young	South Korea	Crime horror thriller	
Sleep No More	Edwin	Rachel Amanda, Lutesha, Iqbaal Ramadhan	Indonesia	Dark fantasy	
Sleepwalker	Brandon Auman	Hayden Panettiere, Justin Chatwin, Beverly D'Angelo	United States	Thriller	
Soulm8te	Kate Dolan	Lily Sullivan, David Rysdahl, Claudia Doumit	United States	Science fiction horror thriller	
Speed Demon	Jon Keeyes	Katie Cassidy, William H. Macy, John Patrick Jordan, Michael Emery, Sari Arambulo	United States	Supernatural horror thriller	
Spider Island	Christopher Smith	Rose Williams, Tim McInnerny, Avani Gregg, Owen Warner, Andy Nyman	United Kingdom	Comedy horror	
Starsuckers	Butler Brothers	Jacob Stickles, Jersey Anderson, James Alex, Manon Ens-Lapointe, Steven Hobé	Canada	Satarical Horror	
Stuffed	Theo Rhys	Jodie Comer, Harry Melling	United Kingdom, United States	Musical Body Horror Romance	
Strawstalker	George Henry Horton	Branika Scott, George Henry Horton	United States	Found footage horror	
Strung	Malcolm D. Lee	Chloe Bailey, Lynn Whitfield, Lucien Laviscount, Anna Diop, Coco Jones, Romy Woods	United States	Psychological thriller	
Teenage Sex and Death at Camp Miasma	Jane Schoenbrun	Hannah Einbinder, Gillian Anderson, Amanda Fix, Arthur Conti, Eva Victor, Zach Cherry, Sarah Sherman, Patrick Fischler, Dylan Baker, Jasmin Savoy Brown, Quintessa Swindell, Kevin McDonald, Jack Haven	United States	Slasher	
Terrifier 4	Damien Leone	David Howard Thornton, Lauren LaVera, Elliott Fullam	United States	Slasher	
The Convenience Store	Jirô Nagae	Kotona Minami, Takeo Gozu, Tetta Seki, Terunosuke Takezai, Shunsuke Tanaka, Natsuki Kato, Mai Tezuka	Japan	Horror	
The Cure	Nancy Leopardi	Samantha Cochran, David Dastmalchian, Ashley Greene, Sydney Taylor, Tyler Lawrence Gray, Alex Veadov	United States	Science fiction horror	
The Devil's Mouth	Jeff Wadlow	Kathryn Newton, Lana Condor	United States	Survival Horror	
The Dreadful	Natasha Kermani	Sophie Turner, Kit Harington , Marcia Gay Harden , Laurence O'Fuarain, Jonathan Howard	United Kingdom, United States	Gothic horror	
The End of Oak Street	David Robert Mitchell	Anne Hathaway, Ewan McGregor, Maisy Stella, Christian Convery	United States	Science fiction mystery thriller	
The Face of Horror	Anna Biller	Jonah Hauer-King, Kristine Froseth, Ellie Bamber, Leo Suter, Bella Heathcote, Ben Radcliffe	United Kingdom	Art horror	
The Hanged Woman	Miguel Ángel Lamata	Eduardo Noriega, Amaia Salamanca, Cosette Silguero, Norma Ruiz, Anastasia Fauteck, Cristina Gallego, Emilio Buale	Spain	Supernatural Horror	
The Hole, 309 Days to the Bloodiest Tragedy	Hanung Bramantyo	Baskara Mahendra, Carissa Perusset, Khiva Iskak, Anya Zen	Indonesia	Horror thriller	
The Influencer Project	Mike Nybroe	Gemma Karlsen, Eos Karlsson, Chiara King	United States, Denmark	Found footage Horror	
The Last House	Louis Leterrier	Greta Lee, Wagner Moura	United States	Science fiction horror	
The Mortuary Assistant	Jeremiah Kipp	Willa Holland, Paul Sparks	United States	Supernatural horror	
The Night Mother Return Home	Kou Darachan	Seanghuy Heab, Vann Samphors	Cambodia	Horror	
The RajaSaab	Maruthi	Prabhas, Sanjay Dutt, Nidhhi Agerwal, Malavika Mohanan, Riddhi Kumar, Zarina Wahab	India	Fantasy horror comedy	
The Remedy	Alex Kahuam	Timothy Granaderos, London Thor, Doug Jones, Jenny O'Hara, Chris Mulkey	United States	Supernatural Horror	
The Sacrifice	Prime Cruz	Lovi Poe, Timothy Granaderos, Enchong Dee, Max Collins, Lav Diaz, Louie Chapman, Piolo Pascual, Pokwang	Philippines	Psychological horror	
The Shepherd	John Hyams	David Dastmalchian, Georgina Campbell	United States	Horror thriller	
The Strangers – Chapter 3	Renny Harlin	Madelaine Petsch	United States	Slasher	
The Voices of Our Mother	Mark O'Brien	Sheila McCarthy, Georgina Reilly, Mark O'Brien, Carolina Bartczak, Alex Ozerov-Meyer, Shawn Doyle	Canada	Supernatural Horror	
The Waiting Man	Carl Sundström	Noel Salblix, Minna Evås, Marcus Stenberg, Cristian Åsvik	Sweden	Found Footage Horror	
The Whistler	Diego Velasco	Diane Guerrero, Juan Pablo Raba, Indhira Serrano	Venezuela, United States, Colombia	Horror Mystery Thriller	
The Wolf and the Lamb	Michael Schilf	Cassandra Scerbo, Adrianne Palicki, Jaydon Clark, Eric Nelsen, Angus Macfadyen, Q'orianka Kilcher, Zach McGowan, James Landry Hébert, Clint Howard, Sammi Rotibi	United States	Western folk horror	
The Wolf Will Tear Your Immaculate Hands	Nathalie Álvarez Mesén	Alexander Skarsgård, Pernilla August, Bronte Carmichael	Sweden, Belgium, United Kingdom, Iceland	Horror drama	
The Yeti	Gene Gallerano, William Pisciotta	Brittany Allen, Eric Nelsen, Jim Cummings, William Sadler, Corbin Bernsen	United States	Monster	
The Young People	Osgood Perkins	Lola Tung, Nico Parker, Brendan Hines, Tatiana Maslany, Johnny Knoxville, Heather Graham, Nicole Kidman	United States	Horror	
They Will Kill You	Kirill Sokolov	Zazie Beetz, Myha'la, Tom Felton, Heather Graham, Patricia Arquette	United States	Horror	
Thrash	Tommy Wirkola	Phoebe Dynevor, Whitney Peak, Djimon Hounsou	United States	Horror survival	
Twisted	Darren Lynn Bousman	Djimon Hounsou, Lauren LaVera, Mia Healey, Alicia Witt, Neal McDonough	United States	Horror	
Ugly Cry	Emily Robinson	Emily Robinson, Ryan Simpkins, Aaron Dominguez, Robin Tunney	United States	Horror	
Underground	Choi Woo-sik	Shin Hyun-soo, Lee Yu-ji, Go Geon-han	South Korea	Mystery Horror	
Unholy Night	Michael Gabriele	Marc Bendavid, Shailene Garnett, Jacqueline Robbins	Canada	Horror	
V/H/S/Mixtape	Flying Lotus, Tobias Forge, Ernest Dickerson, RZA, David Moreau, Renee Zhan	Gwar, Gustaf Hammarsten, Nour El-Refai, Barbara Crampton, Elie Kaempfen, Christopher Romero, Jihad Brent, Mike Ferguson, Neela Jolene, Erin Griff, TJ Minor	United States	Found footage Horror Anthology	
Vampires of the Velvet Lounge	Adam Sherman	Mena Suvari, Dichen Lachman, Stephen Dorff, Rosa Salazar, Lochlyn Munro, India Eisley, Sarah Dumont, Tyrese Gibson	United States	Comedy horror	
VHS: Viva Horror Stories	Darryl Yap	McCoy de Leon, Ella Cruz, Sarah Lahbati,Sachzna Laparan, Kit Thompson	Philippines	Horror Anthology	
Victorian Psycho	Zachary Wigon	Thomasin McKenzie, Maika Monroe, Jason Isaacs	United States, United Kingdom	Horror thriller	
Vvan - Force of the Forrest	Arunabh Kumar, Deepak Kumar Mishra	Tamannaah Bhatia, Sidharth Malhotra, Shweta Tiwari	India	Folk horror thriller	
Water Park Shark	Anthony C. Ferrante	David Chokachi, Chelsea Gilson, Matthew Dame, Kacie Patricia, Michael Shaun Sandy, Snow Feng, Hector Becerra, Brigdon York	United States	Action Comedy Disaster	
Werwulf	Robert Eggers	Aaron Taylor-Johnson, Lily-Rose Depp, Willem Dafoe, Ralph Ineson	United States	Monster	
Wrath of the Gods	Justin Hardy	Francis Magee, Christiane Schaldemose, Jamie Rhodes, Richard Hughson, Dawn Douglas, Martha Robertson	United Kingdom	Horror	
Yellow Eyes	Jesse Korman	Nena Martins, Michael Kunicki, Jimmy Chung, Brian Rooney	United States	Supernatural Horror	
You Can't Leave	Scott Windhauser	Spencer Boldman, Paola Andino	United States	Horror thriller	
