= Dark Hollow Run =

Dark Hollow Run may refer to:

- Dark Hollow Run (Ohio River tributary), in Hamilton County, Ohio, U.S.
- Dark Hollow Run (Crooked Creek tributary), in Indiana County, Pennsylvania, U.S.
- Dark Hollow Run (Delaware River tributary), in Solebury Township, Bucks County, Pennsylvania, U.S.

== See also ==
- Dark Hollow (disambiguation)
