= Project Dorothy =

- Directed by: George Henry Horton
- Screenplay by: Ryan Scaringe; George Henry Horton
- Story by: Ryan Scaringe
- Produced by: Ryan Scaringe George Henry Horton David Andrew
- Starring: Danielle Harris; Tim DeZarn; Adam Budron; Olivia Scott
- Cinematography: Olesia Saveleva
- Edited by: Marc Sedaka
- Music by: Matthew James
- Production companies: Liberty Atlantic Studios; Kinogo Pictures
- Release date: January 16, 2024
- Country: United States
- Language: English

Project Dorothy is a sci-fi action horror film directed by George Henry Horton starring Danielle Harris and Tim de Zarn. The film was released on January 16, 2024.

== Plot ==
Two robbers, (DeZarn and Budron), take refuge in a remote, lifeless lab. Unbeknownst to them, they have awoken a creature from her deep sleep. It's a rat-race between man and machine as they face off against an advanced 1980's AI (Harris).

== Cast ==
- Danielle Harris as Dorothy
- Tim de Zarn as James
- Adam Budron as Blake
- Emily Rafala as Officer Romano
- Olivia Scott as Dr. Jillian
- George Henry Horton as Officer Janus

== Development ==
Project Dorothy was developed by Kinogo Pictures and Liberty Atlantic Studios, with Horton, Scaringe and Harris producing.

== Production ==
Production took place in Illinois. Post took place in Los Angeles.

== Release ==
Project Dorothy was announced in The Hollywood Reporter as having been acquired for US distribution by Gravitas Ventures on December 13, 2023.

=== Marketing ===
On December 18, 2023, a trailer for the film was released.

=== Reception ===
On review aggregator website Rotten Tomatoes, the film holds a positive score of 80%. Bobby LePire of Film Threat said the film 'makes technology run amok and crime thrillers fresh again by mixing the two'. The New York Times said ‘"Project Dorothy" will not win awards, but at a time when everybody seems to think they have something deep to say about A.I., its retro goofiness has the charm of classic B flicks’.
