= Dark Obsession =

Dark Obsession may refer to:

- Diamond Skulls, also known as Dark Obsession, a British 1989 thriller film
- Dark Obsession (2023 film), a psychological thriller film
