= Dark Hollow =

Dark Hollow may refer to:

- Dark Hollow, Indiana, U.S., a place
- Dark Hollow (novel) by Brian Keene, 2006
- "Dark Hollow" (Once Upon a Time), a TV episode
- "Dark Hollow" (song), by Bill Browning, 1958
- Dark Hollow (film), a 2026 American horror film

== See also ==
- Dark Hollow Run (disambiguation)
