= Iqbal Theba =

Pakistani actor (born 1963)

Iqbal Theba اقبال تھیبا
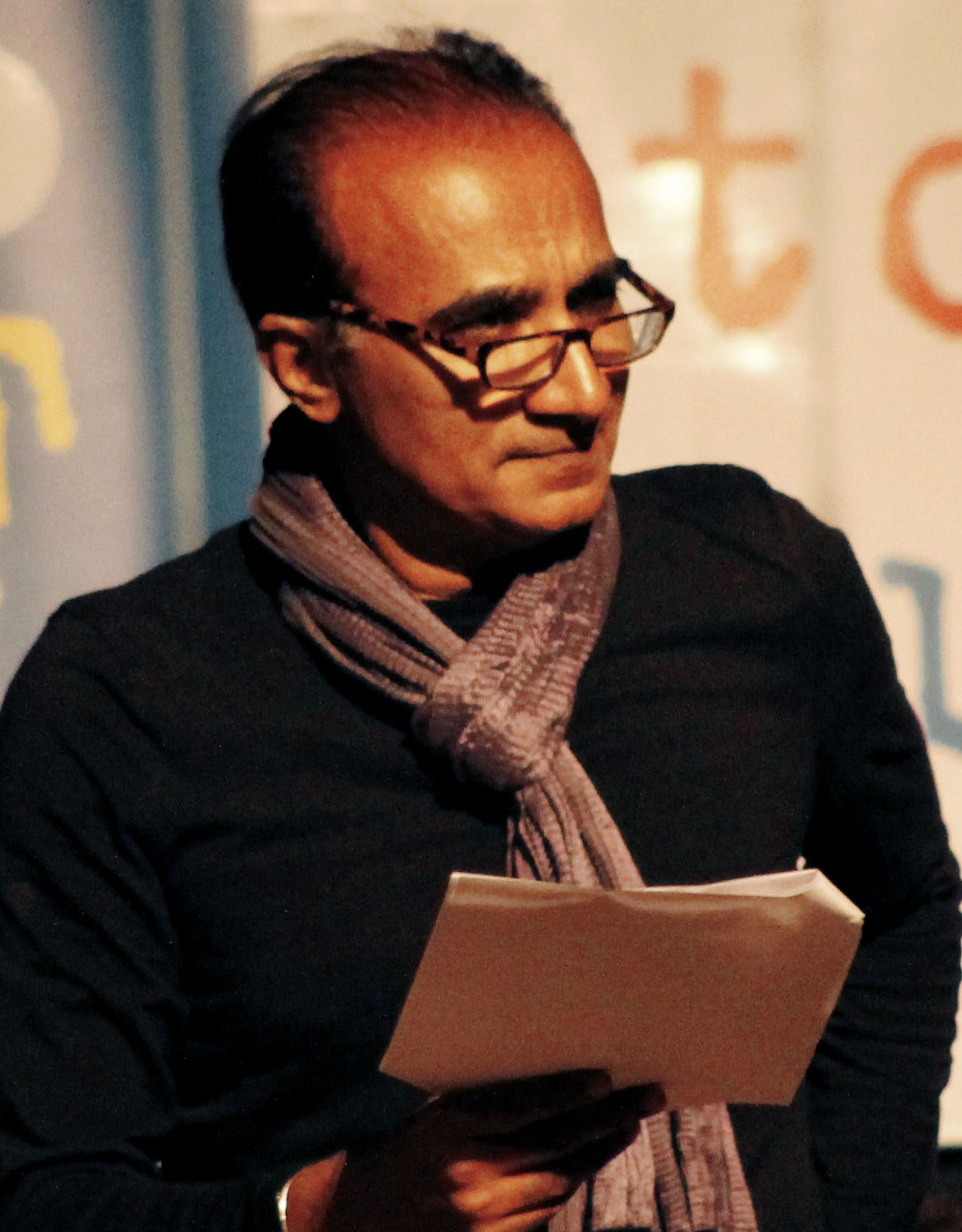
- Theba in 2012
- Born: 20 December 1963 (age 62); Karachi, Pakistan
- Citizenship: United States; Pakistan
- Occupation: Actor
- Years active: 1992–present
- Children: 2

Iqbal Theba (/ˈɪkbɑːl ˈteɪbə/ IK-bahl TAY-bə; born 20 December 1963) is a Pakistani-American actor, best known for his recurring role as Principal Figgins in the show Glee.

== Early life ==
Theba was born in Karachi, Pakistan. According to him, his parents are from Gujrat. He speaks Gujrati and Urdu at home belonging to the Theba tribe. His forefathers are originally from Sindh.

Theba attended the University of Oklahoma for civil engineering in 1981 and has a B.S. After he got his B.S. he went to the Drama School at the University of Oklahoma and studied acting for three years.

== Career ==
Theba experienced an early career break with a role on the NBC television pilot Death and Taxes. While the pilot was not picked up for a series, it led to a recurring role for Theba on The George Carlin Show. Theba also had brief recurring roles on Married... with Children and ER. He had a recurring role in the ABC/CBS comedy sitcom Family Matters. His other credits include appearances on Nip/Tuck, Alias, Two and a Half Men, Bosch, Roseanne, Kitchen Confidential, Chuck, JAG, Arrested Development, Childrens Hospital, The Tick, The West Wing, Friends, Green Book, Sister Sister, Seinfeld, Everybody Loves Raymond, King of the Hill, Weeds, Community, and Transformers: Dark of the Moon. Theba also appeared in an episode of the sitcom Yes, Dear.

In 2009, 2010, and 2013, Theba guest starred in three episodes of NBC's Community as Gobi Nadir, the father of Abed Nadir (played by Danny Pudi). He also guest starred on CBS' NCIS in 2012.

He also was seen on the eighth episode of the eighth season of Hell's Kitchen, attending the 100th dinner service.

In 2017, Theba voiced Slav in season 2 of Voltron: Legendary Defender. Theba played General Umair Zaman, a Pakistani general who stages a military coup, on the HBO comedy series The Brink.

=== Glee (2009–15) ===
Theba's longest-running role has been as Principal Figgins in the Fox television series Glee. Throughout the course of the six seasons, Theba appeared in 58 episodes.

Although Figgins was initially conceived as white, Theba was cast in the role. He said playing Figgins entails finding "the right mix of someone who is an authority figure but who is also very insecure about his own strengths as a person."

In 2012, Theba appeared on the first and ninth episodes of the second season of The Glee Project.

== Personal life ==
He is married and has two children: a son and a daughter. Theba is a Pakistani-American dual national.

== Filmography ==
=== Film ===
Year	Title	Role	Notes
1993	Indecent Proposal	Citizenship Student	
1995	Just Looking	VeeJee	
1996	Driven	Landlord	
1998	Sour Grapes	Dr. Alagappan	
1998	BASEketball	Factory Manager	
2000	Dancing at the Blue Iguana	Clerk	
2001	Guardian	Dr. Tuchman	
2002	Birdseye	Puneet Ristani	
2006	Blind Dating	Mr. Raja	
2009	Frankenhood	Mr. Samuels	
2011	Transformers: Dark of the Moon	UN Secretary General	
2012	Playing for Keeps	Param	
2015	The Escort	Richard	
2016	The Tiger Hunter	General Iqbal	
2017	Lego Scooby-Doo! Blowout Beach Bash	Dr. Najib	Voice, direct-to-video
2017	DriverX	Distinguished Man	
2018	Green Book	Amit	
2019	The Illegal	Babaji	
2020	Useless Humans	Kenneth	
2022	Land of Gold	Gurinder	
2025	Hurricanna	TBA	
2025	Fractured	Dr. Morris	
2026	Super Troopers 3	Dr. Makundan	

=== Television ===
Year	Title	Role	Notes
1993	L.A. Law	Chandra	Episode: "Vindaloo in the Villows"
1994	Living Single	The Pizza Man	Episode: "Five Card Stud"
1994–1995	The George Carlin Show	Various	6 episodes
1994	The Innocent	Doctor #2	Television film
1994	Mad About You	Cabbie	Episode: "The City"
1995	The Computer Wore Tennis Shoes	Sri Lankan	Television film
1995	Seinfeld	Cabbie	Uncredited; Episode: "The Jimmy"
1995–1997	Married... with Children	Iqbal	4 episodes
1995–1997	Family Matters	Zoohair Bhutto	3 episodes
1995	Abandoned and Deceived	The Doctor	Television film
1995	Charlie Grace	Pakistani Clerk	Episode: "Pilot"
1995	Dream On	Rudy the Newsstand Guy	Episodes: "Try Not to Remember" and "Tie Me Sister My Down, Sport"
1996	Sisters	Valentine	Episode: "A Little Snag"
1996	Ned and Stacey	Doctor	Episode: "Gut Feeling"
1996	Can't Hurry Love	Cabbie	Episode: "The Elizabeth Taylor Episode"
1996	Sister, Sister	Dr. Solokian	Episodes: "The Volunteers" and "The Piano Lesson"
1996	Yesterday's Target	Dr. Patel	Television film
1996	The Home Court	Noel	Episode: "Mike Solomon: Unplugged"
1996	Space: Above and Beyond	General Sarij	Episode: "Sugar Dirt"
1996	Homeboys in Outer Space	Habib	Episode: "There's No Space Like Home, or Return of the Jed Eye"
1996	New York Daze	The Cabbie	Episode: "Eric's Book"
1996	The Tomorrow Man	FBI Examiner	Television film
1996	Roseanne	Dr. Bakshi	Episodes: "Hoi Polloi Meets Hoiti Toiti" and "Roseambo"
1997	Ellen	Dalai Rajhavaari	Episode: "Hello, Dalai"
1997	Caroline in the City	Koothrappally the Cabbie	Episode: "Caroline and the Critics"
1997–2001	ER	Dr. Zagerby / Dr. Zogoiby	4 episodes
1997	Total Security	Sangarapillai	Episode: "The Never Bending Story"
1997	Everybody Loves Raymond	Doctor Sundram	Episode: "Golf"
1997	Brooklyn South	Omar Rashmid	Episode: "Love Hurts"
1998	Fired Up	Driver	Episode: "Fire and Nice"
1998	Friends	Joey's Doctor	Episode: "The One Hundredth"
1998	JAG	Johnny Marvel	Episode: "Wedding Bell Blues"
1998	King of the Hill	Dr. Bhudamanjur	Voice, episode: "Next of Shin"
1998	Martial Law	Raj Patel	Episode: "Trackdown"
1999	Malcolm & Eddie	Dr. Halim Sahir	Episode: "Worst Impressions"
1999	Shasta McNasty	Meb	Episode: "Adult Education"
2000	The West Wing	Indian Ambassador	Episode: "Lord John Marbury"
2000	Happily Ever After: Fairy Tales for Every Child	East Indian Driver	Voice, episode: "The Prince and the Pauper"
2000	The Hughleys	Clerk	Episode: "Oh Thank Heaven for Seven-Eleven"
2001	The Huntress	Edouard Barsamian	Episode: "Undercover"
2001	Judging Amy	Mr. Pradip	Episode: "The Last Word"
2001	Yes, Dear	Instructor	Episode: "The Ticket"
2001	The Agency	Dr. Prabhakar	Episode: "Closure"
2001	The Tick	Dry Cleaner	Episode: "The License"
2002	Alias	General Arshad	Episode: "Passage: Part 2"
2003	The Division	Mohammed	Episode: "Hearts & Minds"
2003	Life with Bonnie	Iqbal	Episode: "Boomerang"
2003	The Lyon's Den	Professor	Episode: "The Quantum Theory"
2004	Arrested Development	Nazhgalia	Episode: "Shock and Aww"
2004	Life with Bonnie	Deepak	Episode: "Father and Son: A Table for Two"
2004	JAG	Captain Qamal Samad	Episode: "Trojan Horse"
2004	Dr. Vegas	Mr. Desai	Episode: "Advantage Play"
2004	Joan of Arcadia	East Indian Sunglasses Salesman God	Episode: "Wealth of Nations"
2004	Girlfriends	Dr. Norayan	Episode: "When Hearts Attacks"
2005	Eve	Bob	Episode: "Real Women Have Nerves"
2005	Las Vegas	Parviz Silani	Episode: "Double Down, Triple Threat"
2005–2006	Kitchen Confidential	Iqbal	Episodes: "French Fight" and "Teddy Takes Off"
2005	Just Legal	Dr. Gupta	Episode: "The Limit"
2005	Hot Properties	Fareed	Episode: "Pilot"
2006	The War at Home	Middle-Eastern Man	Episode: "The West Palm Beach Story"
2006	Beyond	Imran Khan	Television film
2007	Weeds	Sanjay's Father	Episode: "Bill Sussman"
2007	Chuck	Peyman Alahi	Episode: "Chuck Versus the Wookiee"
2009	Two and a Half Men	Don	Episode: "I Think You Offended Don"
2009–2010; 2013	Community	Gobi Nadir	3 episodes
2009–2015	Glee	Principal Figgins	58 episodes Screen Actors Guild Award for Outstanding Performance by an Ensemble in a Comedy Series (2010); Nominated – Screen Actors Guild Award for Outstanding Performance by an Ensemble in a Comedy Series (2011); Nominated – Screen Actors Guild Award for Outstanding Performance by an Ensemble in a Comedy Series (2012)
2009	Nip/Tuck	Dr. Vijay Paresh	Episode: "Ricky Wells"
2010	Ghosts/Aliens	Neighbor	Television film
2010	Hell's Kitchen	Himself (Restaurant Patron)	Episode: "9 Chefs Compete: Part 2"
2010	Childrens Hospital	Sultan Abdul Aziz	Episode: "The Sultan's Finger - LIVE"
2012	NCIS	Ramesh Sungupta	Episode: "Housekeeping"
2012	The Glee Project	Principal Figgins	2 episodes; uncredited
2015	The Brink	General Umair Zaman	9 episodes
2016	School of Rock	Alex	Episode: "We Can Be Heroes, Sort Of"
2017	Jeff & Some Aliens	Swami	Voice, episode: "Jeff & Some Jeffs"
2017–2018	Voltron: Legendary Defender	Slav	Voice, 9 episodes
2017	Young & Hungry	Mr. Jain	Episode: "Young & Hold"
2017	Sigmund and the Sea Monsters	Sheriff Bob	Episode: "Dibs"
2018	Season and Renae	Faraz	Television film
2018	America 2.0	Mr. Zanadri	Television miniseries Episode: "Don't Be Scared"
2018	Dream Corp LLC	Patient 75	Episode: "Dust Bunnies"
2019	Bosch	Chemical Ali	Episode: "Salvation Mountain"
2019	The Blacklist	Bhavish Ratna	Episode: "The Hawaladar (No. 162)"
2020	Messiah	Danny Kirmani	4 episodes
2020	Never Have I Ever	Uncle Aaravind	Episode: "...had to be on my best behavior"
2021	Mira, Royal Detective	Detective Gupta	Voice, 3 episodes
2024	Extended Family	Dr. Mullen	Episode: "The Consequences of Sleepovers"
2025	Deli Boys	Baba Dar	

=== Video games ===
Year	Title	Role	Notes
1997	Blade Runner	Moraji	
2012	Medal of Honor: Warfighter	Urdu Fighter	
2017	Uncharted: The Lost Legacy	Additional Voices	
