= Rushi Kota =

Indian American actor

- Born: April 16, 1987 (age 38); Secunderabad, India
- Education: Farmingdale State College (BS); Harvard University (MFA)
- Occupation: Actor
- Years active: 2010–present
- Children: 1

Rushi Kota (born April 16, 1987) is an Indian American actor. He is best known for his role as Prashant in the Netflix show Never Have I Ever and as Dr. Vik Roy in Grey's Anatomy.

== Early life ==
Kota was born in Secunderabad, India. He was raised by his mother in Queens, New York. Initially he wanted to go into automotive engineering, so he doubled majored in Industrial Management Technology and Business Administration at Farmingdale State College.

Due to the Great Recession, he decided to take a different career path. This led him to pursue acting in New York. After two years of acting, he got accepted into Harvard University's MFA program for Acting. This led to an internship in Russia at Stanislavski's Moscow Art Theater School.

== Career ==
Kota has appeared in TV shows such as The Royals, General Hospital, CBS's Extant with Halle Berry, Ryan Murphy's 9-1-1, Freeform's Famous in Love, and Funny or Die's ESL: English is the Second Language.

He has appeared in films like The Divorce Party starring Matilda Lutz and Thomas Cocquerel, Useless Humans, and The One I wrote For You directed by Andrew Lauer and starring Kevin Pollack and Cheyenne Jackson.

He also done some stage work such as Guards At The Taj at the Marin Theater Company, Elaborate Entrance of Chad Deity with the Capital Stage Company, Boston Abolitionist Project, Great Catherine, Blanco Posnet, and Hansel and Gretel at the American Repertory Theater, and Imaginary Invalid at Moscow Art Theatre.

His first major recurring role was in 2017 on Grey's Anatomy as Dr. Vik Roy where he appeared for 16 episodes.

After that, he appeared on shows like iCarly, Ordinary Joe, Never Have I Ever, and CSI: Vegas.

== Personal life ==
Kota is married and has one child. His acting influences are Ryan Reynolds, Idris Elba, and Chadwick Boseman.

== Filmography ==
=== Film ===
Year	Title	Role	Notes	Ref(s)
2010	Afghan Hound	Third Incarnation of Zemar	First Movie Role according to IMDb	
2014	The One I Wrote for Your	Joe Barry		
2017	Super Mehra Bros	AJ Mehra	Lead Role in Movie	
2019	The Divorce Party	Young Executive		
2020	Useless Humans	Louis		
2021	Phobias	Billy McNerny		
2023	Scrambled	Jeff		
2023	Dumb Money	Baiju Bhatt		
2023	Pool	Evan		
2024	The Girl in the Pool	Kevin		

=== Television ===
Year	Title	Role	Notes	Ref(s)
2014	The Royals	Jay D	First Television Role according to IMDb	
2015	General Hospital	Dr. Curtis		
2015	The 101	Jay D		
2015	Extant	Humanich Tech		
2016	Fruitless	Parvesh		
2016	ESL – English as a Second Language	Jeevan	TV Movie	
2016	Terms and Conditions	Dustin		
2017	Famous in Love	Lenny		
2017–2018	Grey's Anatomy	Dr. Vikram Roy		
2018	Grey's Anatomy: The Webisodes	Dr. Vikram Roy		
2019	Arranged	Raj		
2020–2022	Never Have I Ever	Prashant		
2021	iCarly	Luke Tyler		
2021	Ordinary Joe	Sai		
2022	CSI: Vegas	Damien Pak		
2023	The Mindful Adventures of Unicorn Island	Amar		
2025	Chicago Fire	Ambrose Sterling		
