= Davida Williams =

American actress

- Born: Davida Brittany Williams; September 5, 1986 (age 39)
- Occupations: Actress; singer; dancer; photographer; director; producer
- Years active: 1992–present
- Website: Instagram

Davida Brittany Williams (born September 5, 1986) is an American actress, director, and producer. She is best known for her roles as Claire Miller in Lizzie McGuire and Lauren in Raise Your Voice. She is the daughter of the late David Williams and the older sister of Dana Williams.

== Early life ==
Williams grew up in Los Angeles, mostly around the San Fernando Valley. She began auditioning at age 8 and attended Louisville High School, an all girls Catholic high school in Woodland Hills.

Williams went on to briefly attend Mount St. Mary's but dropped out to move to New York City, where she worked as a junior agent at Ford Models. It was during this time she wanted to take a break from acting.

She is of mixed African-American and Italian descent.

== Career ==
Williams was a former member of R&B group TG4

Williams has appeared in a wide variety of television series including The Fresh Prince of Bel-Air, "Hangin' With Mr. Cooper" and Quintuplets. In 2001 she was cast in the Disney Channel original series Lizzie McGuire. She was also the youngest person featured in Kevin Aucoin's makeup book Face Forward alongside Sharon Stone and Christy Turlington. Davida Williams co-starred with Hilary Duff in Lizzie McGuire. They were later reunited for Raise Your Voice. Williams then went on to co-star in the series pilot for Jonas starring The Jonas Brothers.

It was announced in 2008 that Williams would be joining the cast of As the World Turns as Jade Taylor, Williams made her debut on ATWT on December 12, 2008, and continued on the show for about a year thereafter. She then went on to guest star on Revenge on ABC, and 90210, and starred in the film Teenage Bank Heist for Lifetime.

She appeared in the film Dream Girl, starring Margaret Qualley from HBO's The Leftovers and Meredith Hagner of TBS' Search Party. She is also recurring on the series Foursome starring influencer Logan Paul for AwesomenessTV and YouTube Red. In 2017, she could also be seen as a guest star on the CBS series based on the film Training Day, starring Bill Paxton. She will play Kelly Price. She has also guest-starred on Freeform's Baby Daddy as the character Adrienne opposite Tahj Mowry. She has also guest-starred on Disney Channel's Stuck in the Middle. She recurred on the Hulu show CASUAL.

== Filmography ==
=== Film ===
Year	Title	Role	Notes
1993	Younger and Younger	Sonja	
2000	Cry Baby Lane	-	TV movie
2004	Triple Play	Claire	Short
2004	Raise Your Voice	Lauren	
2007	Twisted Fortune	Zoe	
2009	American High School	Trixie	Video
2012	Teenage Bank Heist	Grace Miller	TV movie
2012	Drama Queen	Cheerleader	Short
2014	Locked In	Jessica	Short
2016	This Path	Debra	Short
2016	Dream Girl	Abby	Short
2016	Barrio Tales 2	Gabriella	
2018	Warm Human Magic	Hot Girl	Short
2019	My Daughter's Ransom	Gina	TV movie
2019	Kill The Boyfriend	Ryan	Short
2020	Useless Humans	Jess	
2020	Under My Skin	Dana	
2021	Ultrasound	Stephane	
2021	We Won't Forget	-	Short
2022	Game, Set, Love	Taylor Morrison	TV movie

=== Television ===
Year	Legacy	Role	Notes
1992	Days of Our Lives	-	Episode: "Episode #1.6925"
1993	Hangin' with Mr. Cooper	Sarah	Episode: "Slumber Party"
1993	The Sinbad Show	Sarah	Episode: "It's My Party, I'll Cry If I Want To"
1994	Me and the Boys	Girl	Episode: "Talent Show"
1995	Sweet Justice	-	Episode: "Broken Ties"
1995	Cleghorne!	-	Episode: "The Parent Trap"
1996	The Fresh Prince of Bel-Air	Blue Bird #1	Episode: "I, Bowl Buster"
1996	Sister, Sister	Discovery Scout	Episode: "The Audition"
1997	Cybill	Elizabeth	Episode: "The Wedding"
1997	Star Trek: Deep Space Nine	Lisa	Episode: "Children of Time"
1997	Happily Ever After: Fairy Tales for Every Child	Angela/School Child #1 (voice)	Episode: "Goldilocks and the Three Bears"
2001-03	Lizzie McGuire	Claire Miller	Recurring Cast
2002	The Young and the Restless	Lois	Episode: "Episode #1.7317" & "#1.7323"
2002	Do Over	Suzie	Episode: "Pilot"
2004	The Tracy Morgan Show	Grace	Episode: "Coach Tracy"
2004	Quintuplets	Eliza	Episode: "Date Night"
2007	Nick Cannon Presents: Short Circuitz	Girl	Episode: "Episode #1.4"
2008-09	As the World Turns	Jade Taylor	Regular Cast
2010	90210	Aaliyah	Episode: "They're Playing Her Song"
2012	Revenge	Brenda	Episode: "Justice"
2013	CollegeHumor Originals	Jane	Recurring Cast
2016-17	Foursome	Tipper	Guest: Season 1, Recurring Cast: Season 2
2017	Training Day	Kelly Price	Episode: "Bad Day at Aqua Mesa"
2017	Baby Daddy	Adrienne	Episode: "The Sonny-Moon"
2017	Stuck in the Middle	Kelly	Episode: "Stuck in a Good Deed"
2017	Casual	Lana	Recurring Cast: Season 3
2017	That's the Gag	Davida	Episode: "Keke Creates Her Own Destiny"
2020	Bite-Size Halloween	-	Episode: "Retreat"
2021	B Positive	Nina	Episode: "Inflammatory Response"
2023	Quantum Leap	Leslie Drobis	Episode: "The Friendly Skies"
2025	The Irrational	John F. Showalter	Episode: "The Lost Souls"
