= The Copenhagen Test =

American television series

- Promotional poster
- Genre: Science fiction; Action; Spy thriller
- Created by: Thomas Brandon
- Showrunners: Thomas Brandon; Jennifer Yale
- Starring: Simu Liu; Melissa Barrera; Sinclair Daniel; Brian d'Arcy James; Mark O'Brien; Kathleen Chalfant
- Composer: Nathan Micay
- Country of origin: United States
- Original language: English
- No. of seasons: 1
- No. of episodes: 8

Production
- Executive producers: James Wan; Simu Liu; Jennifer Yale; Thomas Brandon; Jet Wilkinson; Mark Winemaker; Michael Clear; Rob Hackett
- Cinematography: Celiana Cárdenas; Luc Montpellier
- Running time: 47–56 minutes
- Production companies: Atomic Monster; Bully Pile Productions; Universal Content Productions

Original release
- Network: Peacock
- Release: December 27, 2025

The Copenhagen Test is an American science fiction spy thriller television series created by Thomas Brandon for Peacock. It stars Simu Liu and Melissa Barrera, with Liu and James Wan also serving as executive producers. The series premiered on December 27, 2025. In April 2026, the series was canceled after one season.

== Premise ==
In the near future, an intelligence agent's brain is hacked, allowing the hackers access to everything he sees and hears. He must prove his allegiance and uncover the perpetrators.

== Cast and characters ==
=== Main ===
- Simu Liu as Alexander Hale, a Chinese-American military veteran and intelligence agent at the Orphanage
- Melissa Barrera as Michelle Cyr, a French-Canadian field agent at the Orphanage
- Sinclair Daniel as Samantha Parker, an intelligence analyst at the Orphanage
- Brian d'Arcy James as Peter Moira, the Director of Operations at the Orphanage
- Mark O'Brien as Edmund Cobb, an Orphanage analyst
- Kathleen Chalfant as Patricia St. George, the Orphanage's mysterious Director

=== Recurring ===
- Adina Porter as Marlowe, the Director of Intelligence at the Orphanage
- Sara Amini as Ellie, an Orphanage analyst working under Parker
- Marnie McPhail as Frances, an Orphanage analyst
- Hannah Cruz as Dr. Rachel Kasperian, Alexander's ex-fiancée
- Saul Rubinek as Victor Simonek, Alexander's mentor and uncle figure
- Adam Godley as Frederick Schiff, Cobb's mentor
- Anthony Jhade as Remy, an Orphanage field agent
- Oscar Hsu as Preston Hale, Alexander's father
- Lauren Tom as Helen Hale, Alexander's mother

== Episodes ==
No.	Title	Directed by	Written by	Original release date
1	"Copenhagen"	Jet Wilkinson	Thomas Brandon	December 27, 2025
During a mission in Belarus, U.S. Special Forces sniper Alexander Hale reluctantly chooses to save a Belarusian boy over an American woman. Three years later, Hale works as an analyst for The Orphanage, a clandestine oversight agency monitoring the rest of the intelligence community. He remains haunted, struggling with anxiety and migraines. After an operation in North Korea fails, Hale suspects he is being investigated as a mole by the elite “Upstairs” division. His mentor Victor Simonek warns the agency's cautious nature means they won't offer him due process, even if he is innocent. Hale deduces Belarus was an orchestrated DoD loyalty assessment called a Copenhagen Test. He also suspects an enemy is monitoring him via a nanite biohacking implant codenamed Cassandra, causing the migraines. Both are confirmed by Orphanage executives Marlowe and Moira in a Faraday cage, who enlist him to partake in Operation Claymore, a ruse to expose the enemy and discover what intel is compromised.
2	"Glass House"	Jet Wilkinson	Thomas Brandon	December 27, 2025
A month prior, the Orphanage discovers Hale is biohacked. Moira recruits predictive analyst Samantha Parker and operative Michelle into Claymore. Marlowe discovers Michelle played the American woman during the Copenhagen Test, and Parker criticises her for not declaring it beforehand. Hale works out the nanites entered his system via anxiety medication from his ex-fiance Dr. Rachel Kasperian, and tells Moira. He and Michelle pretend to go on a date to draw out enemy observers. Multiple operatives enter, aiming to scan Hale to ensure the Cassandra signal hasn't been altered. He and Michelle draw them into a no signal area and capture them. All three are revealed to be corrupt American intelligence agents identified by the hack, blackmailed to work for a mysterious man with a walking cane. Orphanage analyst Cobb meets with his mentor Schiff, a friend of Simonek, who uses a cane.
3	"False Flag"	Kevin Tancharoen	Jamie Chan	December 27, 2025
4	"Obsidian"	Kevin Tancharoen	Adam Benic	December 27, 2025
5	"Looking Glass"	Vincenzo Natali	Marilyn Fu	December 27, 2025
6	"Allegiance"	Vincenzo Natali	Hannah Rosner	December 27, 2025
7	"Not the World of Men"	Nima Nourizadeh	Jennifer Yale & Monica Buccini	December 27, 2025
8	"The Orphanage"	Nima Nourizadeh	Thomas Brandon	December 27, 2025
Going back 11 months, Rachel meets with the Kavich representative to get the drugs for Alex. The rep breaks the illusion of their overt transaction and speaks plainly as to why he's in the game, but Rachel shuts him down and says she believes in the cause and is a willing participant. Cutting to 1 week ago, when St. George meets with Alex in the cube, you now hear what they talk about, namely that the Copenhagen test is flawed in that everyone considers the mission in a binary, not being free to consider a 3rd option. She mentions that she trusts his conscience to do the right thing. In present-time, Samantha starts to piece together everything that Alex did in his last moments, feeling like she's missing a critical piece. When Michelle gets back to the Orphanage and mentions that she told Alex about the Orphanage bugging his apartment as a ruse to regain his trust, Samantha suddenly understands that Alex was intentionally leaving breadcrumbs as to what the plan is without tipping off Schiff. Moira watches with Samantha when Hale sees the face of "St. George" for the first time, and notices that he breathes a sign of relief when he realizes she's not her and that the message was received. Cutting to present day, Alex is still seizing on the ground when the mysterious newcomer picks up his adrenaline shot and stabs it into his neck, revealing that he's actually Cobb, and that he has been following Alex at a distance and is there to help. They fight off another hit squad and drive toward the restaurant to rescue Alex's parents at Victor's restaurant. While the hit team opens the door to the restaurant, it's revealed that Michelle was assigned there to help by the Orphanage and starts the counterattack. When she's overwhelmed, she hides behind the bar with Victor, who reveals that the restaurant is full of gun caches which enables them to make progress against waves of enemies. As they get pinned down, Alex arrives and, alongside Michelle, dispatch the remaining assassins as the Orphanage team arrives to secure and clean up the scene. Alex succumbs to the symbiosis with the nanites and wakes up with Francis inside the cube, where it's revealed that the new version of Cassandra is survivable after symbiosis. Schiff leads the Orphanage to shut down the receiving stations, and Moira gives Alex a way to control the hack. Multiple parties piece together that Schiff actually isn't the mastermind behind the hack, but only a beneficiary of it. Alex shares a drink with Cobb, who reveals that he pieced things together by watching Victor, leading Alex to confront him. Victor reveals that with the technology stabilized, they've actually implemented the hack on 6 individuals, including another knowing agent watching Michelle.

== Production ==
=== Development ===
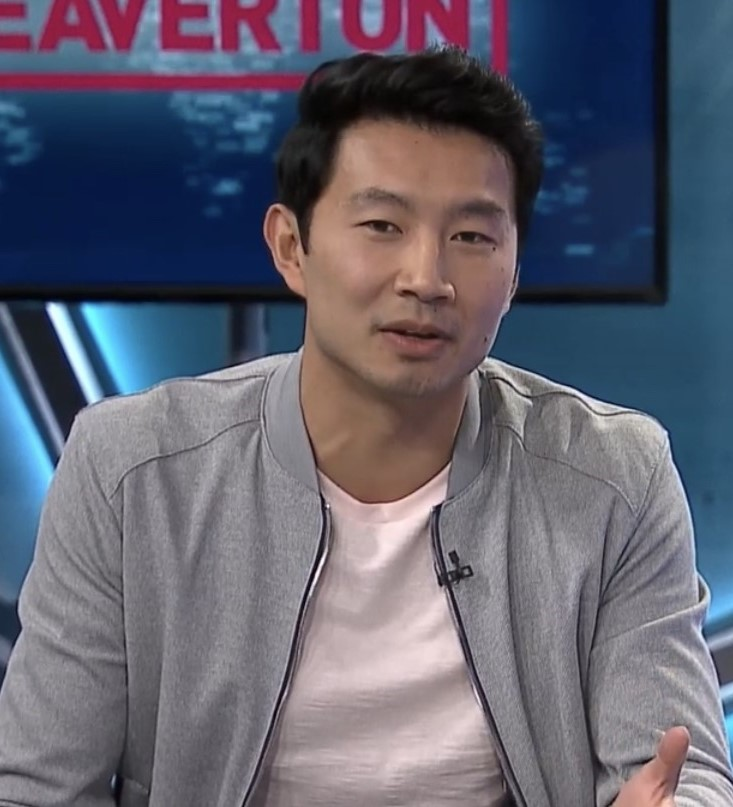
Liu (left) leads the series as Alexander Hale

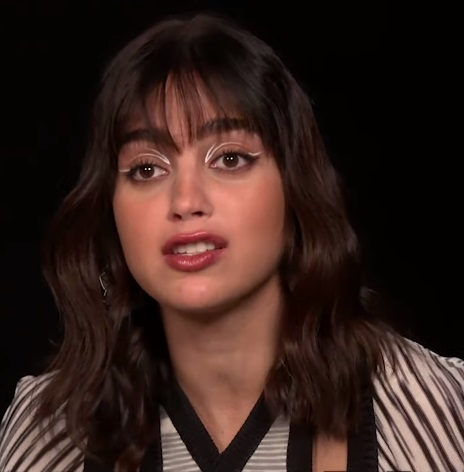
while Barrera (right) co-leads as Michelle Cyr

The espionage techno-thriller series was picked up by Peacock in February 2024. Thomas Brandon serves as creator, writer and executive producer for the series alongside co-showrunner and executive producer Jennifer Yale. James Wan, Michael Clear and Rob Hackett are executive producers for Atomic Monster, with Simu Liu also an executive producer. Mark Winemaker and Jet Wilkinson serves as executive producer, with Wilkinson directing the first two episodes.

The cast is led by Simu Liu and Melissa Barrera and includes Sinclair Daniel, Brian d'Arcy James, Mark O'Brien and Kathleen Chalfant as series regulars. In October 2024, the title of the series was initially revealed as Copenhagen. In November, Sara Amini joined the cast in a major recurring role as Ellie. Saul Rubinek was revealed as part of the cast the next month.

On April 15, 2026, Peacock canceled the series after one season.

=== Filming ===
Principal photography began on October 21, 2024, in Toronto, and wrapped on March 11, 2025.

== Release ==
The Copenhagen Test premiered on December 27, 2025, on Peacock, with all eight episodes released at once. It premiered in the UK on Channel 4 in April, 2026.

== Reception ==
=== Audience viewership ===
According to Variety, The Copenhagen Test scored 1.1 billion streams in the weeks between December 27, 2025 and January 1, 2026, making it the third most viewed show in America at the time, surpassing Netflix's Emily in Paris, HBO Max's The Pitt, and Amazon Prime's Fallout. It fell behind only Stranger Things and Landman in streaming viewership. The Copenhagen Test also reached the number one spot on Peacock's top ten TV show list, and was deemed a "Streaming Success" mere days after its release. The Copenhagen Test debuted at slot number 10 on the Nielsen Top Ten and drawing in the highest concentration of Black viewers (20%) and the highest concentration of Asian viewers (12%) across all top 10 titles.

=== Critical response ===
On the review aggregator website Rotten Tomatoes, the series holds an approval rating of 71% based on 24 reviews. The website's critics consensus reads, "After a slow start, The Copenhagen Test solidly sprints into thrilling spy-fare territory with engaging performances from Simu Liu and Melissa Barrera." Metacritic, which uses a weighted average, gave it a score of 61 out of 100 based on 8 critics, indicating "generally favorable" reviews.

Ron Seoul-Oh of Pop Culture News gave the show a 3/5, saying, "Through seven and a half of the eight-episode first season, The Copenhagen Test is fast, exciting and intriguing. The binge drop on Peacock will be welcomed by viewers eager to click through to the next episode after each previous one ends. The finale however is where the pacing falters."

Joel Keller of Decider praised the show for "[feeling] mostly like a solid conspiracy drama with a little bit of sci fi mixed in." He also praised the performances, with Liu and Barrera singled out for their chemistry, and named Saul Rubinek the "sleeper star" of the show.

Rating the show 8/10, Jeff Ewing of Collider wrote, "The Copenhagen Test is an engaging, entertaining spy thriller with a sci-fi edge. Liu serves as a strong lead for the series, boasting strong action chops and great chemistry with Barrera. [...] The Copenhagen Test is a thrilling series that seeds just enough of a sci-fi element throughout for something truly fresh in the spy genre.

Saloni Gajjar of The A.V. Club rated the show a C+, complimenting the performances of main cast members such as Melissa Barrera, "who kicks ass as Michelle and seamlessly plays the layered woman well," and Sinclair Daniel, for a "breakout" performance. However, she criticized the show for including too many plot twists to maintain their shock value, writing "[...] for a show that wants to be a wild ride, it can get borderline boring at times."
