= Apples Never Fall =

- Genre: Mystery; Drama
- Based on: Apples Never Fall by Liane Moriarty
- Developed by: Melanie Marnich
- Directed by: Chris Sweeney; Dawn Shadforth
- Starring: Annette Bening; Sam Neill; Jake Lacy; Conor Merrigan Turner; Essie Randles; Georgia Flood; Jeanine Serralles; Dylan Thuraisingham; Alison Brie
- Music by: Marco Beltrami; Miles Hankins
- Countries of origin: United States; United Kingdom; Australia
- Original languages: English; Italian
- No. of episodes: 7

Production
- Executive producers: Albert Page; Jillian Share; Joe Hortua; Annette Bening; Liane Moriarty; Chris Sweeney; Gregory Jacobs; Melanie Marnich; David Heyman
- Producers: Ra'uf Glasgow; Wade Savage; Gina Gonzalez
- Cinematography: Robert Humphreys; Laurie Rose
- Editors: Jeff Israel; Jacquelyn Le; Philip Fowler; Nona Khodai; Matthew James Barbato
- Running time: 46–66 minutes
- Production companies: Matchbox Pictures; Call Me Mel Productions Inc.; Universal Content Productions; Universal International Studios; Heyday Television

Original release
- Network: Peacock
- Release: March 14, 2024

Apples Never Fall is a mystery drama television miniseries developed by Melanie Marnich and based on Liane Moriarty's novel of the same name. It premiered on Peacock on March 14, 2024. It is the also the first Liane Moriarty novel-based series that does not involve Nicole Kidman in either production nor the cast.

== Premise ==
Two tennis coaches, Stan and Joy, sell their school and are ready to enjoy retired life. But when matriarch Joy Delaney suddenly goes missing, her husband Stan appears as a possible suspect, because they had an altercation before her disappearance. Their four children are forced to revisit the image of the perfect couple they had of their parents and family secrets surface.

== Cast ==
=== Main ===
- Annette Bening as Joy Delaney, the matriarch and Stan's wife. Her disappearance is the main mystery
- Sam Neill as Stan Delaney, the patriarch and Joy's husband. After Joy disappears, he becomes the main suspect
- Jake Lacy as Troy Delaney, Joy and Stan's wealthy older son and venture capitalist
- Conor Merrigan Turner as Logan Delaney, Joy and Stan's younger son who almost became a pro tennis player, but now manages a marina
- Essie Randles as Brooke Delaney, Joy and Stan's youngest child and physical therapist
- Georgia Flood as Savannah, a woman who shows up at Joy and Stan's doorstep one night
- Jeanine Serralles as Elena Camacho, a detective looking into Joy's disappearance
- Dylan Thuraisingham as Ethan Remy, Elena's partner who's investigating Joy's disappearance
- Alison Brie as Amy Delaney, Joy and Stan's oldest child and spiritual life coach

=== Recurring ===
- Katrina Lenk as Lucia Fortino, Monty's wife who's having an affair with Troy
- Nate Mann as Simon Barrington, Amy's 24-year-old landlord and roommate
- Ana Maria Belo as Caro Azinovic, Joy and Stan's neighbor who is also Joy's friend
- Giles Matthey as Harry Haddad, a tennis star who Stan used to coach
- Paula Andrea Placido as Gina Solis, Brooke's fiancée
- Pooja Shah as Indira Chaundry, Logan's girlfriend
- Madeleine Jones as Claire Delaney, Troy's ex-wife
- Timm Sharp as Monty Fortino, Troy's boss and Lucia's husband

== Episodes ==
No.	Title	Directed by	Teleplay by	Original release date
1	"The Delaneys"	Chris Sweeney	Melanie Marnich	March 14, 2024
2	"Logan"	Chris Sweeney	Lijah Barasz	March 14, 2024
3	"Amy"	Dawn Shadforth	Kimi Howl Lee	March 14, 2024
4	"Brooke"	Dawn Shadforth	Gianna Sobol	March 14, 2024
5	"Troy"	Dawn Shadforth	Joe Hortua	March 14, 2024
6	"Stan"	Chris Sweeney	Aaron Fullerton	March 14, 2024
7	"Joy"	Chris Sweeney	Melanie Marnich & Lijah Barasz	March 14, 2024

== Production ==
David Heyman won the rights to the novel in March 2021 to develop it for television. In February 2022, Peacock gave it a straight to series order. In February 2023, Annette Bening, Sam Neill, Alison Brie and Jake Lacy were cast to star. In March, Georgia Flood, Conor Merrigan Turner, Essie Randles, Jeanine Serralles and Dylan Thuraisingham were added to the cast. Katrina Lenk, Timm Sharp and Nate Mann were among six cast in recurring roles in June.

Filming began in Queensland, Australia and London, England in March 2023, before it was suspended in July due to the 2023 SAG-AFTRA strike.

== Reception ==
The review aggregator website Rotten Tomatoes reported a 46% approval rating with an average rating of 5.9/10, based on 39 critic reviews. The website's critics consensus reads, "There's the seed of a strong series in Apples Never Fall thanks to its outstanding cast and intriguing hook, but those promising elements can't quite polish up a rote story." Metacritic assigned a score of 54 out of 100 based on 21 critics, indicating "mixed or average reviews".

Karina Adelgaard of Heaven of Horror gave Apples Never Fall a 4 out of 5. Matt Roush of TV Insider gave the series a 2.5 out of 5.
