= Pee Mak (2026 film) =

2026 adaptation film of Victor Villanueva

- Theatrical release poster
- Directed by: Victor Villanueva
- Screenplay by: Roni Benaid; Alpha Habon
- Story by: Nontra Kumwong; Ter Chantavit Dhanasevi; Banjong Pisanthanakun
- Based on: Pee Mak by Banjong Pisanthanakun
- Produced by: Vincent Del Rosario III; Veronique Del Rosario-Corpus; Valerie S. Del Rosario
- Starring: Bea Binene; Wilbert Ross
- Cinematography: Steven Evangelio; Pao Orendain
- Edited by: Aaron Alegre
- Music by: Paulo Almaden
- Production company: Studio Viva
- Distributed by: Viva Films
- Release date: October 14, 2026
- Running time: 115 minutes
- Country: Philippines
- Language: Filipino
- Box office: ₱120 million

Pee Mak is a 2026 Philippine folk horror romantic comedy Philippine adaptation of the 2013 Thai film Pee Mak written by Roni Benaid and Alpha Habon and directed by Victor Villanueva. The film stars Bea Binene and Wilbert Ross.

== Cast ==
- Bea Binene as Pee Nang
- Wilbert Ross as Phil Mark "Mak"
- Vandolph as Teryo
- Jairus Aquino as Ayong
- TJ Valderrama as Poknat
- Gian Bernardino as Bunak
- Candy Pangilinan
- Janno Gibbs
- Jerome Ponce
- Ram Tolentino as Bangkero

== Production ==
In March 2025, Vincent Del Rosario announced the remake of the Thai hit film Pee Mak with the working title Mak Mak.

In April 2026, Viva Films officially announced that Wilbert Ross and Bea Binene will be the leading stars.

== Release ==
Pee Mak was released in theaters in the Philippines on October 14, 2026, under Viva Films.

== Reception ==
=== Box office ===
The film was released on October 14, 2026, and as of November 8, 2026 the film has grossed ₱100 million (US$1.25 million) at the Philippine box office.

=== Critical response ===
Nazamel Tabares of Pelikula Mania gave the film 3.5 out of 5 stars and wrote that the movie "honors the 2013 Thai blockbuster" but "infuses distinct Pinoy wit into every corner."
