= Paula Andrea Placido =

American actress

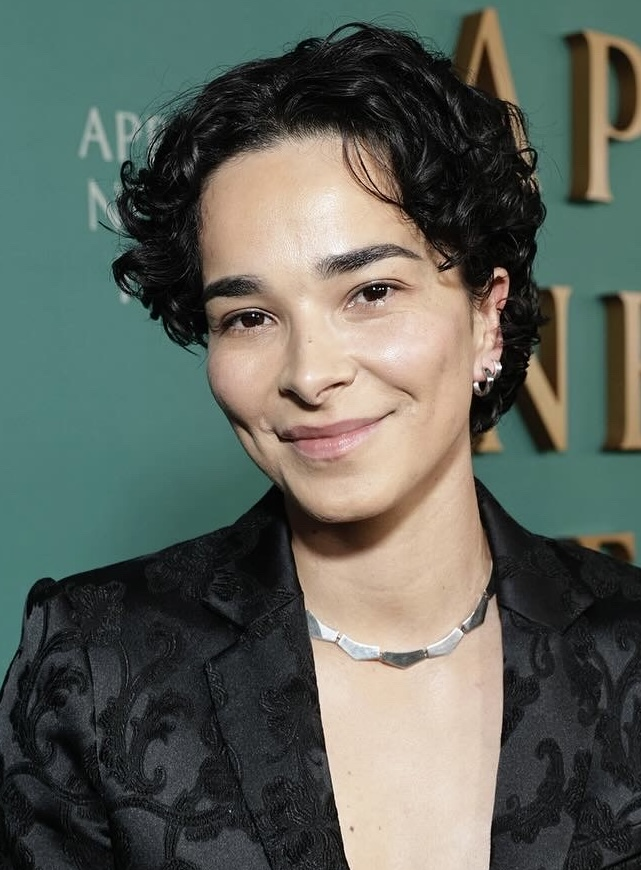
- Born: Paula Andrea Placido Marin; San Francisco de Macoris, Dominican Republic
- Occupation: Actor

Paula Andrea Placido is an American actress. She was born in the Dominican Republic to an Italian-Argentine father and Colombian mother of indigenous descent. Her TV breakout role came as Calista, recurring on the final season of Showtime’s Shameless. Her most notable work is recurring roles in Showtime’s The L Word: Generation Q as Roxy, Charlie in Apple TV’s Sugar and Gina Solis in Peacock’s Apples Never Fall.

== Career ==
Placido started out working on commercials. Her first major commercial booking was Smirnoff’ s 75th anniversary “Everybody Mule” directed by Ricky Saiz. She worked on more than 30 commercials for Brands such as Apple’s Air Pod Max Pro “Journey into sound” commercial with Cinematographer Linus Sandgren and Chevrolet’s Equinox directed by Lance Acord.

She had her first TV breakout role came as Calista, recurring on the finale season of Showtime’s Shameless. Guest Starring on HBO Max’s HACKS series as Ava’s Tenant Rian. Fox’s The Resident where she played a MMA champion and Own’s All Rise alongside Lindsay Mendez. She’s appeared in Never Have I Ever, Star Trek: Picard, and The Shrink Next Door.

Her most notable work is recurring as Roxy on Showtime’s The L Word: Generation Q as Roxy, Gina Solis on Peacock’s Apples Never Fall series based on the book by Liane Moriarty and Apple TV’s Sugar series starring Colin Farrell in the recurring role of Charlie.

She made her major motion picture debut as Quinn in Lionsgate’s Borderlands.
