= George Henry Horton =

British filmmaker (born 1993)

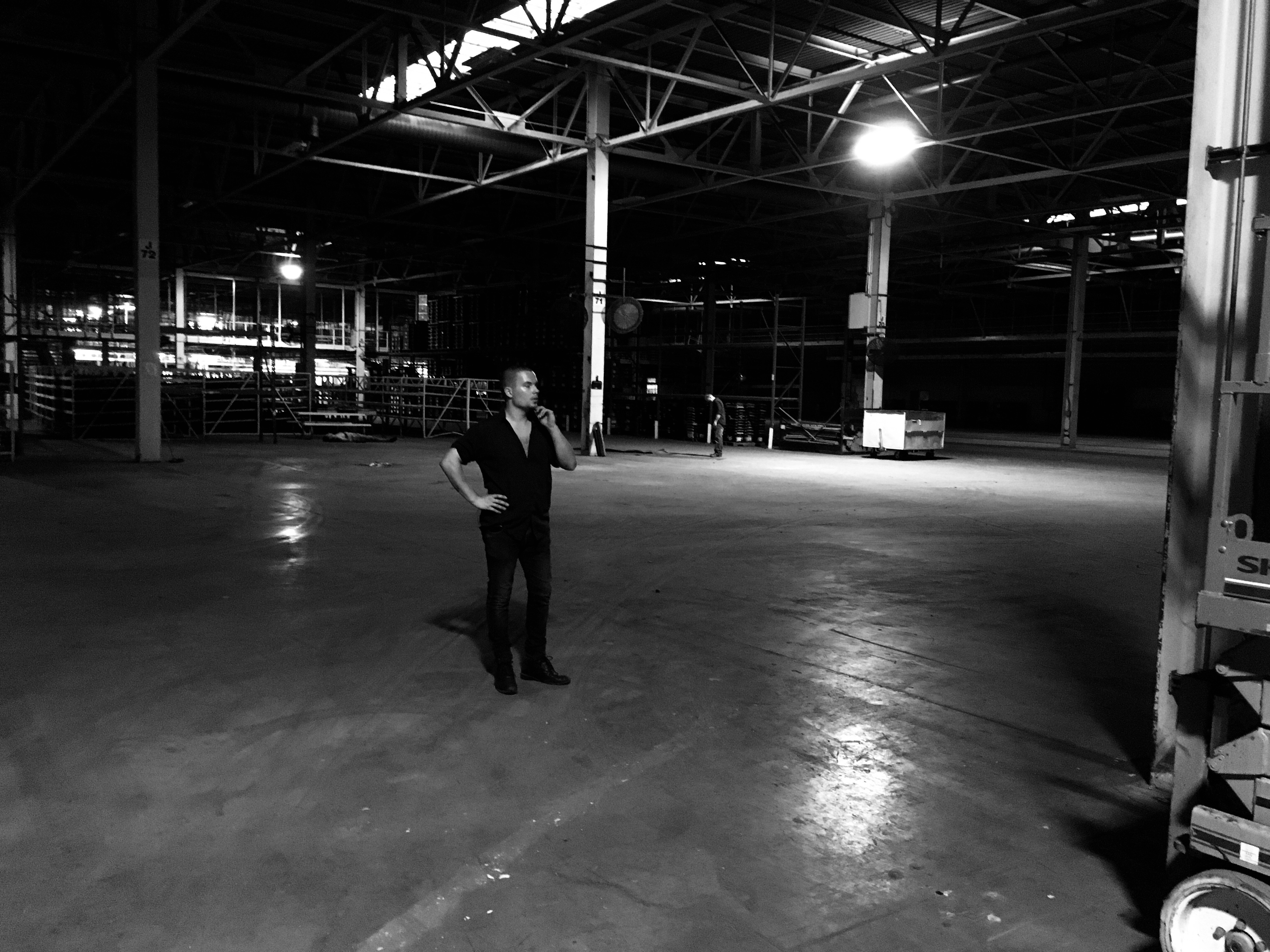
- Horton on the set of Project Dorothy
- Born: 3 July 1993 (age 33); Sevenoaks, Kent, United Kingdom
- Education: American Film Institute; King's College London
- Occupations: Director, producer, writer
- Years active: 2013–

George Henry Horton (born 3 July 1993) is a British filmmaker and actor, best known for his work in horror, science fiction and thriller films, including through his production label Dark Atlantic. He wrote and directed the psychological thriller Dark Obsession, starring Mena Suvari and Danielle Harris, and the science-fiction horror film Project Dorothy, starring Tim DeZarn. Horton was also a member of the YouTube comedy channel JesterLads, which received international media coverage.

== Personal life ==
Horton lives in Los Angeles. He is an alumnus of the American Film Institute Conservatory.

== Filmography ==
Short film

Year	Title	Writer	Producer	Notes
2017	Dreadspace	Yes	Yes	
2019	Waiting Game	No	Yes	

Feature film

Year	Title	Director	Writer	Producer	Notes
2021	The Other Side of the Ring	No	No	Yes	
2022	The Secret Cup	No	No	Yes	
2023	Dark Obsession	Yes	Yes	Yes	
2024	Project Dorothy	Yes	Yes	Yes	
2024	For The Taking	No	No	Yes	
2026	Wait Til Dawn	No	No	Yes	
2026	Dark Hollow	No	No	Yes	
2026	The Dreadful	No	No	Yes	
2026	Strawstalker	Yes	Yes	Yes	
TBD	Erie	No	No	Yes	premiering at Beyond Fest
TBD	Demonetize	No	No	Yes	
TBD	Send A Scare	No	No	Yes	
TBD	The Punishing	No	No	Yes	

Associate producer

- Ice Cream in the Cupboard (2020)
- Useless Humans (2021)

Acting roles

Year	Title	Role
2013	Rude Tube	Jedi
2013	Today	Jedi
2013	Good Morning America	Jedi
2014	Crowd Control	Jedi
2020	Useless Humans	Officer McQuade
2023	Dark Obsession	Art Narrator
2024	Project Dorothy	Officer Neilson
2026	Strawstalker	Henry
