= Useless Humans =

2020 American independent film

- Film poster
- Directed by: Stephen Ohl
- Written by: Stephen Ohl; George Caine; Kevin Hamedani; Travis Betz; Ryan Scaringe
- Produced by: Ryan Scaringe; Jon Bloch
- Starring: Josh Zuckerman; Davida Williams; Luke Youngblood; Rushi Kota; Edy Ganem; Maya Kazan; Joey Kern; Iqbal Theba; Tim DeZarn; Kevin Michael Martin
- Cinematography: Scott Summers
- Edited by: Brian Denny
- Music by: Matthew James
- Production company: Kinogo Pictures
- Distributed by: Quiver Digital
- Release date: July 14, 2020
- Country: United States
- Language: English

Useless Humans is a 2020 American independent sci-fi horror comedy film directed by Stephen Ohl and starring Josh Zuckerman, Davida Williams, Luke Youngblood, Rushi Kota, Edy Ganem, Maya Kazan, Joey Kern, Iqbal Theba, Tim DeZarn and Kevin Michael Martin.

== Plot ==
Brian (Josh Zuckerman) and his three degenerate friends (Davida Williams, Luke Youngblood, Rushi Kota) must save the world when a ruthless monstrous alien crashes his 30th birthday party.

== Cast ==
- Josh Zuckerman as Brian
- Davida Williams as Jess
- Luke Youngblood as Alex
- Rushi Kota as Louis
- Edy Ganem as Chum
- Maya Kazan as Wendy
- Joey Kern as Zachary
- Iqbal Theba as Kenneth
- Tim DeZarn as Tim DeZarn
- Kevin Michael Martin as Kevin Michael Martin

== Reception ==
The film has received mixed reviews, holding a 40% approval rating on Rotten Tomatoes based on 10 reviews with an average score of 5.4/10. Alex Saveliev of Film Threat said the film "is not devoid of merit, but neither is it good enough to recommend". Russ Simmons of KKFI opined that "it's goofy midnight movie fodder that never quite delivers the laughs it had hoped for".

On the other hand, Amanda Mazzillo of Film Inquiry gave a positive review, concluding that the "very aspect of Useless Humans aims to affectionately recall films of the past while maintaining a perfectly modern tone with its comedy, twists, and characters".
