= Monster: The Lizzie Borden Story =

- Promotional release poster
- Showrunner: Ian Brennan
- Starring: Ella Beatty; Vicky Krieps; Charlie Hunnam; Rebecca Hall
- No. of episodes: 8

Release
- Original network: Netflix
- Original release: September 17, 2026

Season chronology
- ← Previous; The Ed Gein Story

Monster: The Lizzie Borden Story is the fourth season of the American crime drama television series Monster, created by Ian Brennan for Netflix. The season centers on murder suspect Lizzie Borden (Ella Beatty) who was tried and acquitted of the 1892 axe murders of her father and stepmother in Fall River, Massachusetts. It also stars Vicky Krieps, Charlie Hunnam, and Rebecca Hall, alongside Jessica Barden, Joey Pollari, Billie Lourd, and Sarah Paulson in recurring roles.

It is the fourth installment in the Monster anthology series, following The Jeffrey Dahmer Story (2022), The Lyle and Erik Menendez Story (2024), and The Ed Gein Story (2025). The season is the first in the anthology to center on a female protagonist, a person who was never convicted of the crimes they were accused of, and a story not primarily set in the 20th century. Brennan, who also served as the writer of all eight episodes, said that the season's focus on Borden provided an opportunity to explore themes of sexism and gender inequality.

Upon its premiere on September 17, 2026, the season received mixed to negative reviews from critics, who praised the performances and production design but criticized its historical liberties and fictionalized portrayals of Borden and other historical figures.

== Premise ==
On August 4, 1892, the Borden spouses, Andrew and Abby, are found hacked to death with a hatchet in their home in Fall River, Massachusetts. Their daughter/stepdaughter, Lizzie, became the prime suspect in the murders.

== Cast and characters ==
=== Main ===
- Ella Beatty as Lizzie Borden
- Vicky Krieps as
  - Bridget "Maggie" Sullivan, the Borden family's housemaid and Lizzie's lover
  - Elizabeth Báthory, an alleged serial killer accused of killing and torturing girls and women from 1590 to 1610.
- Charlie Hunnam as Andrew Borden, Emma's and Lizzie's father
- Rebecca Hall as Abby Borden, Andrew's second wife and Emma's and Lizzie's stepmother

=== Recurring ===
- Jessica Barden as Nance O'Neil, a stage actress who formed a close friendship with Lizzie
- Joey Pollari as John Morse, Emma's and Lizzie's maternal uncle
- Linda Reiter as Bertha Manchester
- Billie Lourd as Emma Borden, Lizzie's older sister
- Sarah Paulson as Aileen Wuornos, a serial killer who committed seven murders between 1989 and 1990
- Scarlett DeMeo as Sarah Anthony Borden, Lizzie's and Emma's mother.

=== Guest ===
- Oliver Spenceman as Stephen
- Ari Graynor as Michele Gillen

== Episodes ==
No. overall	No. in season	Title	Directed by	Written by	Original release date
28	1	"Bloodbath"	Max Winkler	Ian Brennan	September 17, 2026
Lizzie Borden lives with her father Andrew, her stepmother Abby, and her older sister Emma in Fall River, Massachusetts. Lizzie is unhappy under Abby's controlling behavior and the restrictive expectations placed upon her. The household hires a new Irish maid, Bridget Sullivan, whom Abby insists on calling Maggie, after the previous maid. Lizzie becomes fascinated by Maggie's uninhibited personality, and the two quickly form a close relationship. Maggie tells Lizzie the story of Elizabeth Báthory and encourages her to question the life she has been forced to accept. Their attraction grows as Maggie introduces Lizzie to experiences outside her sheltered upbringing. Lizzie eventually brings Maggie to the dovecote, where the two bathe together in a tub filled with cherries and become intimate.
29	2	"Strong Kitty"	Max Winkler	Ian Brennan	September 17, 2026
Lizzie and Maggie continue their secret relationship. Maggie reveals that Andrew has been having sex with her and discovers that she is pregnant. She confronts Andrew and demands money to end the pregnancy. Lizzie's resentment toward her father and stepmother intensifies, and she and Maggie begin considering ways to escape the Borden household. Abby later discovers Lizzie's beloved doves and kills them. Enraged by their deaths and her treatment by her family, Lizzie decides that Andrew and Abby must die. They attempt to poison Andrew and Abby by serving them spoiled oysters, causing both to become violently ill but survive.
30	3	"Whack Job!"	Max Winkler	Ian Brennan	September 17, 2026
Andrew's brother-in-law John Morse arrives at the Borden home and pressures Andrew for financial assistance. Meanwhile, Maggie is subjected to a brutal punishment, prompting Lizzie and Maggie to reconsider their plan for killing Andrew and Abby. Seeking to determine whether they are capable of murder, they target Bertha Manchester. Maggie initially participates but hesitates when the time comes to kill her. Lizzie takes over and murders Bertha herself. A Portuguese laborer is subsequently arrested for the crime, allowing Lizzie and Maggie to escape suspicion. Having successfully killed someone without being caught, Lizzie prepares to carry out the murders of her father and stepmother.
31	4	"R.I.P (Rest in Pestilence) Abby Borden"	Sarah Adina Smith	Ian Brennan	September 17, 2026
In 1988, Aileen Wuornos is introduced during an encounter with a man before the story returns to Fall River in 1892. Abby grows increasingly dissatisfied with her marriage and considers how she might change her circumstances. Lizzie and Maggie finalize their plan to murder the Bordens. On the morning of August 4, Lizzie confronts Abby upstairs and attacks her with a hatchet, repeatedly striking her until she is dead. Abby's body is left in the upstairs guest room while Lizzie and Maggie prepare for Andrew's return home.
32	5	"41"	Max Winkler	Ian Brennan	September 17, 2026
Andrew reflects on his past and his deteriorating marriage to Abby while remaining unaware that she has been murdered. After spending the previous night drinking and engaging in debauchery, Andrew returns home on August 4. Abby's body remains upstairs as Andrew settles onto the sitting-room sofa. Maggie begins the attack on Andrew, after which Lizzie takes over and repeatedly strikes her father with the hatchet, killing him. With both Andrew and Abby dead, Lizzie and Maggie begin preparing to conceal their involvement in the murders.
33	6	"Bed and Breakfast"	Sarah Adina Smith	Ian Brennan	September 17, 2026
Following Andrew's murder, Lizzie and Maggie hurriedly clean the house and remove evidence connecting them to the killings. Lizzie burns incriminating clothing while the women arrange the scene and construct an account of Lizzie's whereabouts. The bodies of Andrew and Abby are subsequently discovered, and police begin questioning Lizzie about the events surrounding their deaths. Lizzie provides inconsistent answers about where she was and what she was doing, increasing investigators' suspicions. In the future, Aileen Wuornos visits the Borden house after it has been converted into a bed and breakfast and expresses her fascination with Lizzie and the murders.
34	7	"The Trial of the Century"	Max Winkler	Ian Brennan	September 17, 2026
Lizzie is imprisoned while awaiting trial for the murders of Andrew and Abby. Her case attracts widespread public attention as prosecutors attempt to establish that she killed her parents. Lizzie's contradictory statements become a central part of the case against her. Actress Nance O'Neill befriends Lizzie and coaches her on how to present herself before the jury. Emma testifies in defense of her sister and recounts seeing a mysterious pale man, creating an alternative possibility for the killings. With no eyewitness to the murders and insufficient physical evidence connecting Lizzie to the weapon, the prosecution struggles to prove its case. The jury finds Lizzie not guilty, and she is released. Following her acquittal, Lizzie announces plans to use her newfound freedom and inheritance to establish an animal sanctuary and briefly sees Maggie outside the court.
35	8	"Carnival"	Max Winkler	Ian Brennan	September 17, 2026
Following her acquittal, Lizzie attempts to build a new life with the wealth she inherited from Andrew. Despite her freedom, her association with the murders follows her, leaving her increasingly isolated. Her relationship with Emma deteriorates, and Lizzie struggles to find meaning in the life she had fought to obtain. She eventually reunites with Maggie and seeks her forgiveness. The two reconcile and resume their relationship, becoming involved in the women's suffrage movement and eventually living openly together. In the future, Aileen Wuornos is arrested, tried and convicted of murder. Her imprisonment ultimately leads to her execution, while Lizzie lives out the remainder of her life as a free woman. The stories of Lizzie and Aileen converge in a surreal final sequence following their deaths.

== Production ==
The season was first announced to be in development on July 8, 2025. Ella Beatty was cast as Lizzie Borden later that month, alongside Rebecca Hall and Vicky Krieps, while Charlie Hunnam joined the cast in September. Principal photography began in Los Angeles in September 2025 and wrapped in March 2026.

According to creator Ian Brennan, the season explores misogyny, gender roles, and societal expectations placed on women in the Victorian era. It also examines class and sexuality themes through the relationship between Borden and Bridget Sullivan.

== Release ==
The season was released globally on Netflix, on September 17, 2026.

== Reception ==
=== Audience viewership ===
The Lizzie Borden Story became the third season of the anthology series to debut at number one on Netflix's global weekly chart, with 12.1 million views (or 80.1 million hours viewed) within four days of its release, although it was the lowest debut in the anthology. It garnered 14.5 million views (or 95.9 million hours viewed) in its second week, representing a 20% increase in viewership from the previous week, but still remaining below the second-week viewership of its predecessors.

=== Critical response ===
The review aggregator website Rotten Tomatoes reported a 38% approval rating, based on 29 critic reviews, with an average rating of 5.0/10. The website's consensus reads: "Ella Beatty, Sarah Paulson, and Rebecca Hall remain trapped in an ill-fitted, uninspiring new rendition of Monster that doesn't bother to give The Lizzie Borden Story anything interesting to say." Metacritic, which uses a weighted average, gave a score of 47 out of 100, based on 15 critics, indicating "mixed or average" reviews.

In her review for The Guardian, Lucy Mangan gave the series 2 out of 5 stars, criticizing its focus on menstruation, sexuality and graphic violence while arguing that it failed to explore Lizzie Borden, the social conditions of the period and the circumstances surrounding her acquittal. She praised the performances, particularly Rebecca Hall's portrayal of Abby Borden. Henri Enoh Tchato of Critical Registrar gave the series 2.5 out of 5, praising the performances and production design, but criticizing its reliance on invented drama and sensationalism. In a similar review, Kaiya Shunyata of RogerEbert.com praised the series' performances, production design and its stories involving Elizabeth Báthory and Aileen Wuornos, but criticized its portrayal of Lizzie Borden and its fictionalized treatment of the historical case. However, Matthew Creith of TheWrap described the series as a highly stylized mixture of gothic horror, sexual melodrama and dark comedy, while criticizing the series for its historical liberties and its inclusion of Aileen Wuornos.
