= Bury the Devil =

- Theatrical release poster
- Directed by: Adam O'Brien
- Written by: John Petrizzi; Brad Hodson
- Story by: Adam O'Brien
- Produced by: Philip Kalin-Hajdu; Benoit Beaulieu; Adam O'Brien
- Starring: Emmanuelle Lussier-Martinez; Dawn Ford; Bill Rowat
- Production companies: Sequence Film LLC; Delirium Pictures
- Distributed by: Brainstorm Media
- Release dates: March 6, 2026 (FrightFest); August 21, 2026
- Running time: 84 minutes
- Countries: United States; Canada
- Language: English

Bury the Devil (stylized in all caps) is a 2026 supernatural horror thriller film directed by Adam O'Brien from a screenplay by John Petrizzi and Brad Hodson, based on an original story by O'Brien. Shot in a style mimicking a continuous, unbroken single take, the film stars Emmanuelle Lussier-Martinez, Dawn Ford, and Bill Rowat. It was released in select theaters and on digital streaming services by Brainstorm Media on August 21, 2026.

== Plot ==
Bury the Devil follows Julia, a hospice nurse who is assigned to care for Evelyn, an elderly woman with dementia who lives alone in an isolated lakeside house. Julia arrives during a storm and initially believes Evelyn’s unusual behavior is related to her illness. Evelyn frequently becomes confused and mistakes Julia for her deceased daughter, Sarah.

As the night progresses, Evelyn begins displaying increasingly disturbing behavior. Julia discovers strange symbols, occult objects and evidence suggesting that something more than dementia may be affecting Evelyn. Evelyn also recites passages concerning the transfer of souls, causing Julia to question what is happening inside the house.

Evelyn’s estranged husband, Randall, arrives unexpectedly. He warns Julia that Evelyn is dangerous and reveals that their daughter Sarah died under mysterious circumstances. Randall and Evelyn’s past appears to involve occult practices connected to Sarah’s death. Julia becomes suspicious of Randall’s intentions and forces him to leave.

Randall later returns with several men to restrain Evelyn. During the confrontation, Evelyn becomes violently possessed by a supernatural entity, killing one of the men. Julia is left trapped inside the house as the situation deteriorates. She discovers further evidence concerning Sarah’s death and learns that Evelyn and Randall had attempted to communicate with supernatural forces following their daughter’s death.

Randall eventually explains that an ivory figurine is connected to the entity possessing Evelyn. He believes the object must be destroyed or buried to prevent the entity from continuing to exist. A priest, Father Thierry, is brought to the house to perform an exorcism, but the attempt fails. The entity attacks the group, killing several people and leaving Julia to confront it alone.

The entity begins exploiting Julia’s grief over her own mother’s death, taking on familiar voices and memories in an attempt to manipulate her. Julia eventually recognizes the deception and tries to reach Evelyn, who is still trapped beneath the possession. She encourages Evelyn to confront her guilt over Sarah’s death.

Julia manages to weaken the entity, allowing Evelyn to briefly regain control. Evelyn then reveals that the entity cannot simply be expelled and must be destroyed while inhabiting a living host. Believing there is no other way to stop it, Evelyn covers Julia with gasoline and sets her on fire.

The supernatural entity continues speaking through Julia as the house catches fire. Evelyn watches as the building burns, apparently sacrificing Julia in an attempt to destroy the entity permanently. The film ends with the lakeside house consumed by flames, leaving the ultimate fate of the entity uncertain.

== Cast ==
- Emmanuelle Lussier-Martinez as Julia
- Dawn Ford as Evelyn
- Bill Rowat as Randall
- Jason Cavalier
- Skyler Clark

== Production ==
Director Adam O'Brien conceived the project as a real-time thriller relying on a simulated continuous single-take camera setup to heighten the claustrophobic atmosphere. Principal photography took place in Canada and the United States, produced by Sequence Film and Delirium Pictures.

== Release ==
Bury the Devil was premiered at FrightFest on March 6, 2026. The film was acquired by Brainstorm Media for distribution. The film debuted in select North American theaters and VOD streaming platforms on August 21, 2026.

== Reception ==
On the review aggregator website Rotten Tomatoes, 67% of 12 critics' reviews are positive, with an average rating of 7.10/10.

Matt Goddard of FilmHounds gave the film a positive review and 3 out of 5 stars and he wrote: Bury the Devil can’t help but evoke some effective one-shot haunted house tales.

Joel Harley of Starburst was impressed and gave the film a positive feedback and 4 out of 5 star rating and he said: The first in a planned trilogy, Bury the Devil does a great job of setting up its fascinating mythology, cleverly teasing the planned prequel and sequel films.

Matthew Jackson of Bloody Disgusting also gave the film positive review and a 3 out of 5 rating, he wrote: The story’s not quite all the way there, and the camera work sometimes devolves into the needlessly frenetic, but this is still a remarkably tense, brutal piece of work that goes for the throat and, despite loosening its grip now and then, never lets go.

Bee Delores of Macabre Daily gave the film a perfect 5 out of 5 rating and wrote: From the strong ensemble cast to the eeriness of quiet, background scares and poignant thematic elements, the 2026 indie film operates to enflame every sense in the viewer’s body and leave them drained and gasping for air.

Anton Bitel of SciFiNow also gave the film a positive review and he said: The one-shot format is certainly a technical marvel, but it also allows us, along with Julia, to get lost in an echoing, ambiguous hell house primed for destruction.
