= Strawstalker =

- Promotional release poster
- Directed by: George Henry Horton
- Screenplay by: George Henry Horton
- Produced by: George Henry Horton; Ryan Scaringe; Derek Matarangas; Aspen Miller
- Starring: Branika Scott; George Henry Horton
- Cinematography: Derek Matarangas
- Edited by: Rommel Villa
- Music by: Matthew James
- Production company: Dark Atlantic
- Distributed by: Indie Rights
- Release date: May 4, 2026
- Country: United States
- Language: English

Strawstalker is an American found footage horror film directed by George Henry Horton. Announced on April 9 by Bloody Disgusting, the film follows content creators who encounter a supernatural scarecrow.

== Plot ==
The film centers on an aspiring starlet couple whose lives are disrupted when a “supernatural scarecrow” appears in their home after they move to make it big in Los Angeles. The presence becomes increasingly aggressive, turning their online activity into a real-time horror experience.

== Cast ==
- Branika Scott
- George Henry Horton

== Production ==
Strawstalker is described as a “tongue-in-cheek found footage horror” and a “killer scarecrow flick” that explores a lighter side of the genre, inspired by the history of the San Fernando Valley as once being farmland. Horton said: 'Not that long ago, it was all farmland. Now it's this strange mix of suburbia, aspiration, and performance. You can't help but wonder what the land remembers... and what it might say about us now'.

The film was shot in various locations across Los Angeles, but primarily in the San Fernando Valley.

== Release ==
Strawstalker was announced for release in spring 2026 by Indie Rights. It was released on VOD on May 4th. Film Threat called it 'Supremely sinister... A great movie that shows the found footage format is back with a vengeance', whist B-Sides & Badlands called it 'Deliciously campy... Horton understands what makes horror work in the digital age'.
