= Phi Phong: The Blood Demon =

- Theatrical release poster
- Directed by: Quoc Trung Do
- Starring: Doan Minh Anh; Diep Bao Ngoc; Nutthacha Nina Jessica Padovan; Kieu Minh Tuan
- Cinematography: Fa Chau Tran
- Music by: Nguyen Hoang Anh; Khuat Duy Minh
- Production companies: BlueBell Studios; Mockingbird Pictures
- Distributed by: CJ HK Entertainment; Golden Screen Cinemas; Infinity Group; M Pictures; M Studio; MVP M-Pictures Film Distribution; Mockingbird Pictures; Movie Cloud; PT Omega Film; Sil-Metropole Organisation
- Release date: April 24, 2026
- Country: Vietnam
- Language: Vietnamese
- Box office: $5.09 million (₫134.1 billion)

Phi Phong: The Blood Demon (Vietnamese: Phi Phông: Quỷ Máu Rừng Thiêng) is a 2026 Vietnamese supernatural horror film directed by Do Quoc Trung. The film is inspired by folklore from Vietnam’s northern highlands about the Phi Phong, a bloodthirsty entity said to live among humans by day while feeding on their blood and life force at night.

== Cast ==
- Doan Minh Anh as Mon
- Diep Bao Ngoc as Lua
- Kieu Minh Tuan as Còn
- Nutthacha Nina Jessica Padovan

== Production ==
The film was directed by Do Quoc Trung and produced by Bluebells Studios and Mockingbird Pictures. Producers described it as a "large-scale horror production that blends regional mythology with visceral cinematic terror" and one of the most ambitious Vietnamese horror films to date. CEO Trang Doan stated the intention was to elevate Vietnamese horror cinema to the global stage by embracing the "terrifying mythology of our region."

== Release ==
Phi Phong: The Blood Demon was released in Vietnam on April 24, 2026, to coincide with the Reunification Day holiday period. Preview screenings ran April 16-19, with strong early reactions leading to an extension through April 23.

International rollout began in May 2026, with Indonesia on May 13 via PT Omega, and Malaysia, Brunei (Golden Screen Cinemas) and Hong Kong (Sil-Metropole Organisation) on May 14. Theatrical releases in North America via Mockingbird Pictures, Taiwan (MovieCloud), Cambodia and Laos (M Pictures) were scheduled for summer 2026.

=== International distribution ===
Ahead of its Vietnam release, the film sold to more than ten territories. The legend of the Phi Phong is regarded as one of the northern highland region’s most chilling supernatural tales, and producers believe its "dark mystique will resonate strongly with international audiences who are increasingly drawn to Southeast Asian horror."

== Reception ==
=== Box office ===
The film became the fastest Vietnamese horror film to reach the VND100bn ($3.8m) milestone, doing so in less than a week before its official opening day. As of April 27, 2026, it had grossed $5.09m (VND134bn), making it Vietnam’s second biggest local film of 2026 to date, behind Tran Thanh’s Bunny!! with ∼$17.1m. It earned $2.63m (VND69.44bn) during preview screenings alone.

=== Critical response ===
Local audiences praised the film for its "gripping narrative, striking visuals, unexpected twists and layered themes beneath its eerie atmosphere," according to Mockingbird Pictures executive producer Phong Duong.
