= Dark Hollow Run (Crooked Creek tributary) =

Location
- Country: United States
- State: Pennsylvania
- County: Indiana County

Physical characteristics
- Source
  - location: Indiana County, Pennsylvania, United States
  - coordinates: 40°42′34″N 79°13′0″W
- Mouth
  - location: Indiana County, Pennsylvania, United States
  - coordinates: 40°39′32″N 79°15′19″W
  - elevation: 1,001 ft (305 m)

Dark Hollow Run (the United States)
Dark Hollow Run (Pennsylvania)

Dark Hollow Run is a tributary of Crooked Creek in Indiana County, Pennsylvania.
