= Dark Obsession (2023 film) =

2023 American independent film

- Directed by: George Henry Horton
- Written by: Blaine Morris; George Henry Horton
- Produced by: George Henry Horton; Blaine Morris; Matt Simonelli; Alyssa Fritz; Danielle Harris; Mena Suvari
- Starring: Blaine Morris; Mena Suvari; Danielle Harris; Adriana Barraza; Lucy Werner; Lenny Amoia; Anwar Wolf
- Cinematography: Luis Jordan Lorenzo
- Edited by: Rommel Villa; Marc Sedaka
- Music by: Becca Schack
- Production companies: Giant Nugget Productions; Liberty Atlantic Studios
- Distributed by: Alarm Pictures
- Release date: August 28, 2023 (United Kingdom)
- Country: United States
- Language: English

Dark Obsession (also known as Anne, With Love), is a 2023 psychological thriller film directed by George Henry Horton and starring Blaine Morris, Danielle Harris and Mena Suvari.

== Plot ==
The story follows Anne, a painter who struggles with inner issues after being forced into a life of solitude when her husband leaves.

== Cast ==
- Blaine Morris as Anne
- Mena Suvari as Maya
- Danielle Harris as Charlotte
- Adriana Barraza as Camilla
- Leonard Amoia as Henry
- Anwar Wolf as Mr. Biltmore
- Lucy Werner as Maggie
- Hunter Brown as Max
- Rocky Perez as Daisy
- Jaime Gallagher as Valerie Ashmore
- Kathleen Kinmont as Elizabeth
- Luke Barnett as Clark

== Production ==
Production took place in Los Angeles and Florida.

== Reception ==
On review aggregator website Rotten Tomatoes, the film holds generally favorable reviews. Martin Unsworth of Starburst Magazine commented that 'Dark Obsession is a great example of a low-budget thriller that builds to a powerful punch', whilst Alan Ng of Film Threat asserted that 'there’s fun and freedom that shines in this indie thriller'. Screenrant wrote: 'making artful use of its singular location to amplify the tension and claustrophobia surrounding the lead character, the movie is a haunting and compelling affair'.
