= Act One (2026 film) =

2026 American film by Sophia Takal

- Directed by: Sophia Takal
- Written by: Sophia Takal
- Produced by: Allison Rose Carter; Julie Christeas; Jon Read; Stephanie Roush; Sophia Takal; Julie Waters
- Starring: Ella Beatty; Ari Graynor; Nate Mann; Elizabeth Reaser; Sinclair Daniel; Robert Sean Leonard; Tavi Gevinson
- Cinematography: Robert Leitzell
- Edited by: Zach Clark; Matthew L. Weiss
- Music by: Jonathan Goldsmith
- Production companies: Tandem Pictures; Savage Rose Films; Watermark Media
- Distributed by: Oscilloscope Laboratories
- Release date: June 10, 2026 (Tribeca Festival)
- Running time: 104 minutes
- Country: United States
- Language: English

Act One is a 2026 American psychological thriller film written, produced and directed by Sophia Takal. It stars Ella Beatty, Ari Graynor, Nate Mann, Elizabeth Reaser, Sinclair Daniel, Robert Sean Leonard and Tavi Gevinson.

The film premiered at the Tribeca Festival on June 10, 2026.

== Cast ==
- Ella Beatty as Hannah
- Ari Graynor as Melanie Saunders
- Nate Mann as Henry
- Elizabeth Reaser as Julie
- Sinclair Daniel as Aggie
- Tavi Gevinson as Gracie Thomas
- Robert Sean Leonard as Tim

== Production ==
Principal photography began in July 2024 on a psychological thriller film written, produced, and directed by Sophia Takal and concluded the following month. In April 2026, the film was selected to be screened at the Tribeca Festival.

== Release ==
Act One premiered at the Tribeca Festival on June 10, 2026. In October 2026, Oscilloscope Laboratories acquired distribution rights to the film.

== Reception ==
On the review aggregator website Rotten Tomatoes, 100% of 14 critics' reviews are positive.
