= Dark Hollow Run (Ohio River tributary) =

Location
- Country: United States
- State: Ohio
- County: Hamilton County

Physical characteristics
- Source
  - location: Hamilton County, Ohio, United States
  - coordinates: 39°7′15″N 84°48′27″W
- Mouth
  - location: Hamilton County, Ohio, United States
  - coordinates: 39°6′48″N 84°47′48″W
  - elevation: 466 ft (142 m)

Dark Hollow Run (the United States)
Dark Hollow Run (Ohio)

Dark Hollow Run is a tributary of the Ohio River in Hamilton County, Ohio.
