= Ella Beatty =

American actress (born 2000)

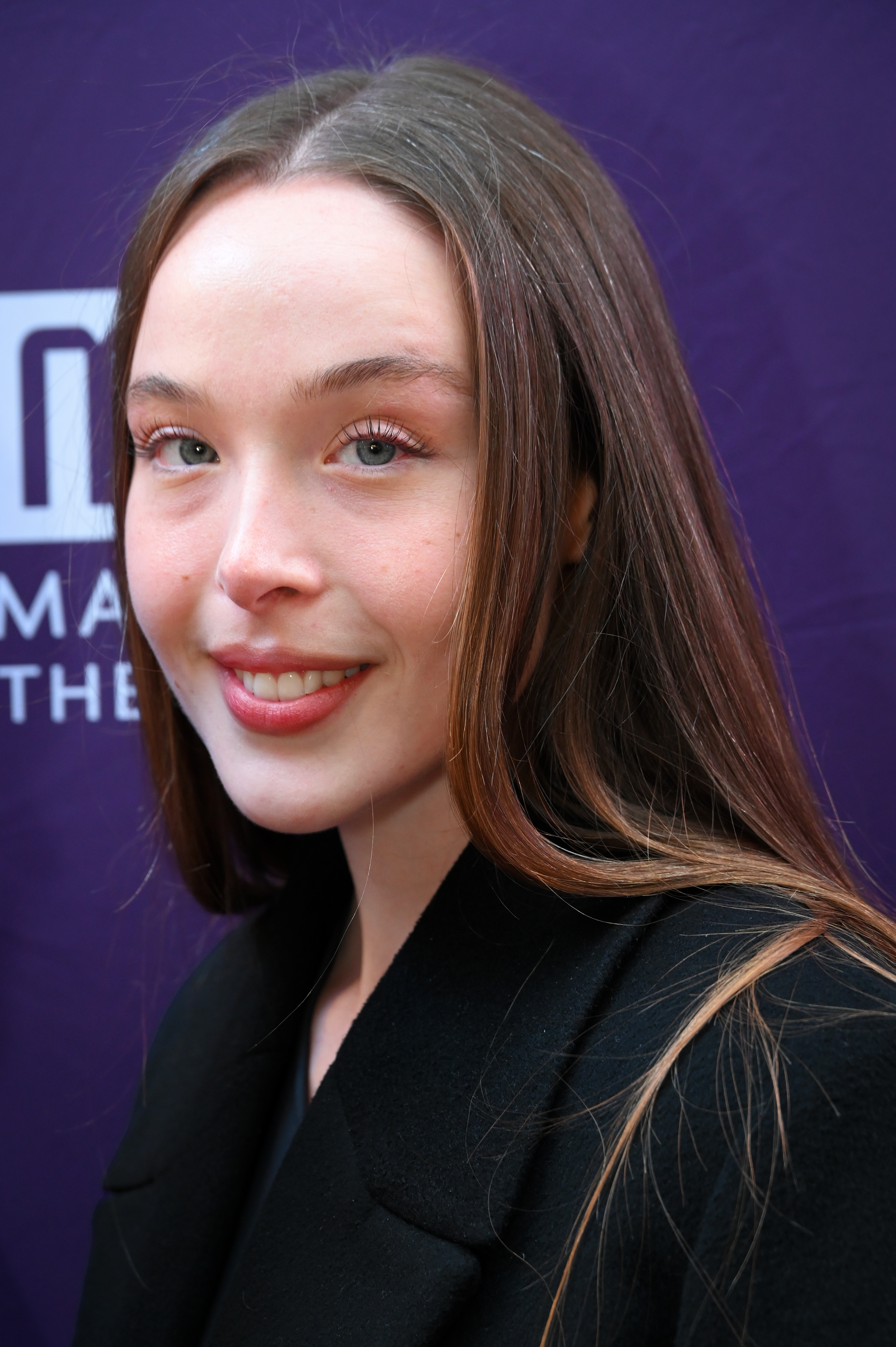
- Beatty in 2026
- Born: April 8, 2000 (age 26); Los Angeles, California, U.S.
- Education: Juilliard School (BFA)
- Occupation: Actress
- Parents: Warren Beatty (father); Annette Bening (mother)
- Relatives: Shirley MacLaine (paternal aunt); Sachi Parker (cousin)

Ella Beatty (born April 8, 2000) is an American actress. An alumna of the Juilliard School, she is best known for her breakthrough role as the titular character in Monster: The Lizzie Borden Story (2026). She has also starred in the films If I Had Legs I'd Kick You (2025) and Act One (2026).

== Early life and education ==
Beatty was born on April 8, 2000, in Los Angeles, California, to actors Annette Bening and Warren Beatty; she is the youngest of the pair's four children. In 2022, she graduated from the Juilliard School, where she studied drama.

== Career ==
Beatty made her screen debut in 2024 with a recurring role as Kerry O'Shea, the surrogate daughter of Truman Capote in the Ryan Murphy anthology series Feud: Capote vs. The Swans for FX on Hulu. That same year, she replaced Elle Fanning as River Rayner in the Branden Jacobs-Jenkins play Appropriate, in her Broadway debut. The following year she returned to theater playing a flirtatious maid, Regina Engstrand in the Lincoln Center Theater production of Henrik Ibsen's Ghosts (2025) at Mitzi E. Newhouse Theater off-Broadway.

In 2025, Beatty made her film debut in the A24 drama film If I Had Legs I'd Kick You, directed by Mary Bronstein, which had its premiere at the Sundance Film Festival. The following year she played the lead role of Lizzie Borden in Ryan Murphy's Monster: The Lizzie Borden Story.

== Acting credits ==
Key
†	Denotes films that have not yet been released

=== Film ===
Year	Title	Role	Notes	Ref.
2025	If I Had Legs I'd Kick You	Kate	Feature film debut	
2026	Act One	Hannah		
TBA	The Bell Jar †	Joan	Post-production	

=== Television ===
Year	Title	Role	Notes	Ref.
2024	Feud: Capote vs. The Swans	Kerry O'Shea	4 episodes	
2026	Monster: The Lizzie Borden Story	Lizzie Borden	Lead role	

=== Theatre ===
Year	Title	Role	Playwright	Venue	Ref.
2024	Appropriate	River Rayner	Branden Jacobs-Jenkins	Belasco Theatre, Broadway debut	
2025	Ghosts	Regina Engstrand	Henrik Ibsen	Mitzi E. Newhouse Theater, Off-Broadway	
2025–2026	Sexual Misconduct of the Middle Classes	Annie	Hannah Moscovitch	Minetta Lane Theatre, Off-Broadway	
