= Sinclair Daniel =

American actress

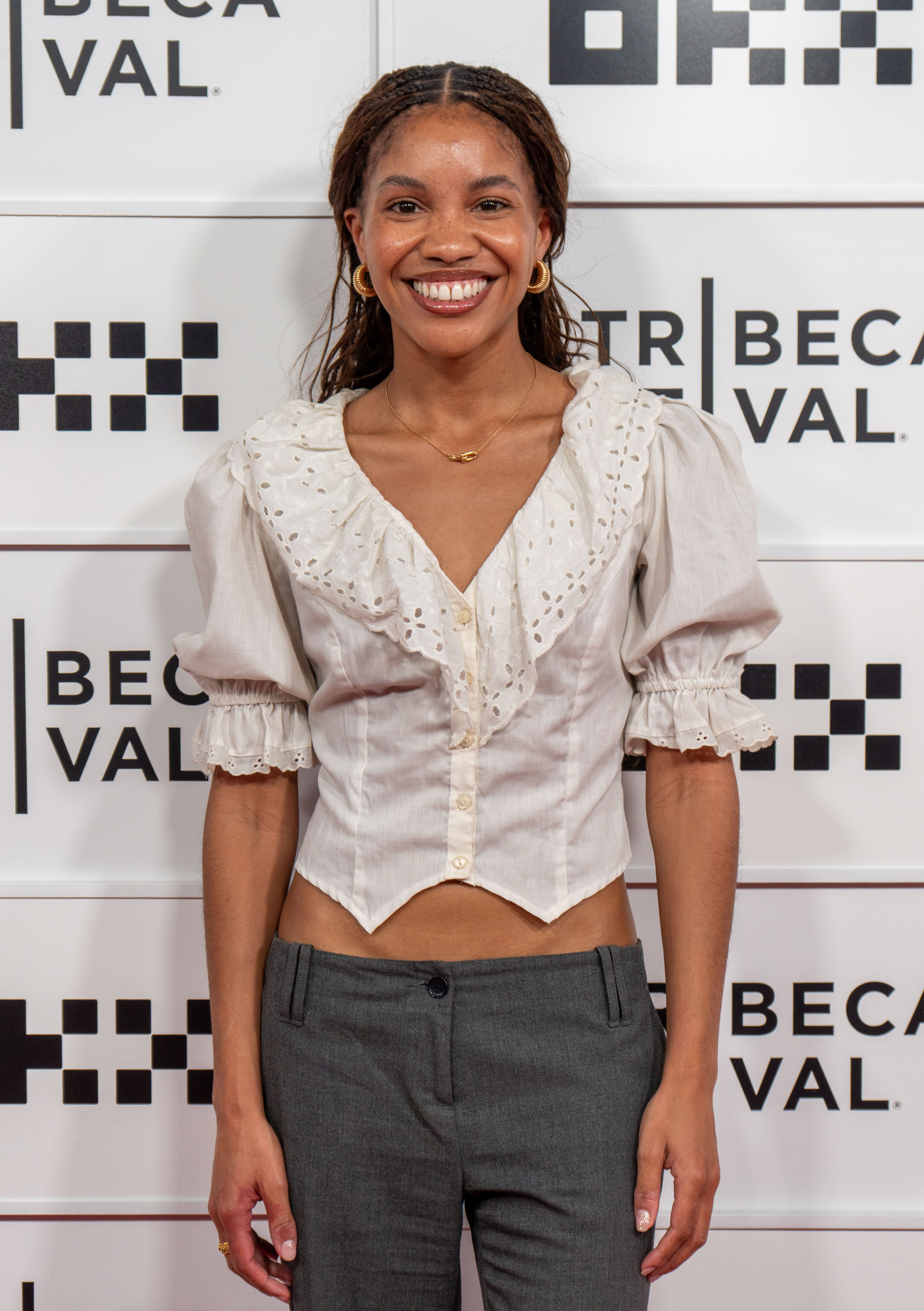
- Sinclair Daniel in 2026
- Born: April 5, 1997 (age 29); New York City, New York, U.S.
- Occupation: Actress
- Years active: 2019–present

Sinclair Daniel is an American actress. She is best known for playing Nella in The Other Black Girl and Chris Winslow in the fifth installment of the Insidious series, Insidious: The Red Door.

== Early life ==
Daniel was born in New York City on April 5, 1997, to an African American family. She attended La Salle High School in Pasadena and graduated with a bachelor of fine arts degree from New York University Tisch School of the Arts.

== Career ==
Daniel began her acting career in 2019 but the start of it was disrupted by COVID. Daniel's first main role came when she played the lead character Nella in the horror series The Other Black Girl.

She played Dalton's college friend Chris in Insidious: The Red Door. Daniel was labeled by Blumhouse Productions as a new scream queen.

Daniel appeared in the James Wan produced series The Copenhagen Test, alongside Melissa Barrera and Simu Liu.

== Filmography ==
=== Film ===
Year	Title	Role	Notes
2019	Cannabitches	Merc	Short
2019	Teresa	Woman	Short
2021	I Love Ana	Mars	Short
2021	One December Night	Brooke	
2022	The Homiesexuals: a social media tragedy	Courtney	Short
2022	Noir	The Kid	
2023	Insidious: The Red Door	Chris Winslow	
2023	The Savior, the Sick, & the Golden One	Nella Rogers	Short
2023	Three Ways Out	Alyssa	Short
2024	The Geechee Witch: A Boo Hag Story	Naledi	
2025	Flashlight	Julia	Short
2026	Act One	Aggie	

=== Television ===
Year	Title	Role	Notes
2019	Madam Secretary	Mia Costello	Episode; Accountability
2021	The Good Fight	Ms Farrow	Episode; And the Fight Had a Détente...
2021	Bull	Clara Williams	Episode: "Snowed In"
2023	The Other Black Girl	Nella Rogers	10 episodes
2025	The Copenhagen Test	Parker	8 episodes
