= Nate Mann =

American actor (born 1996)

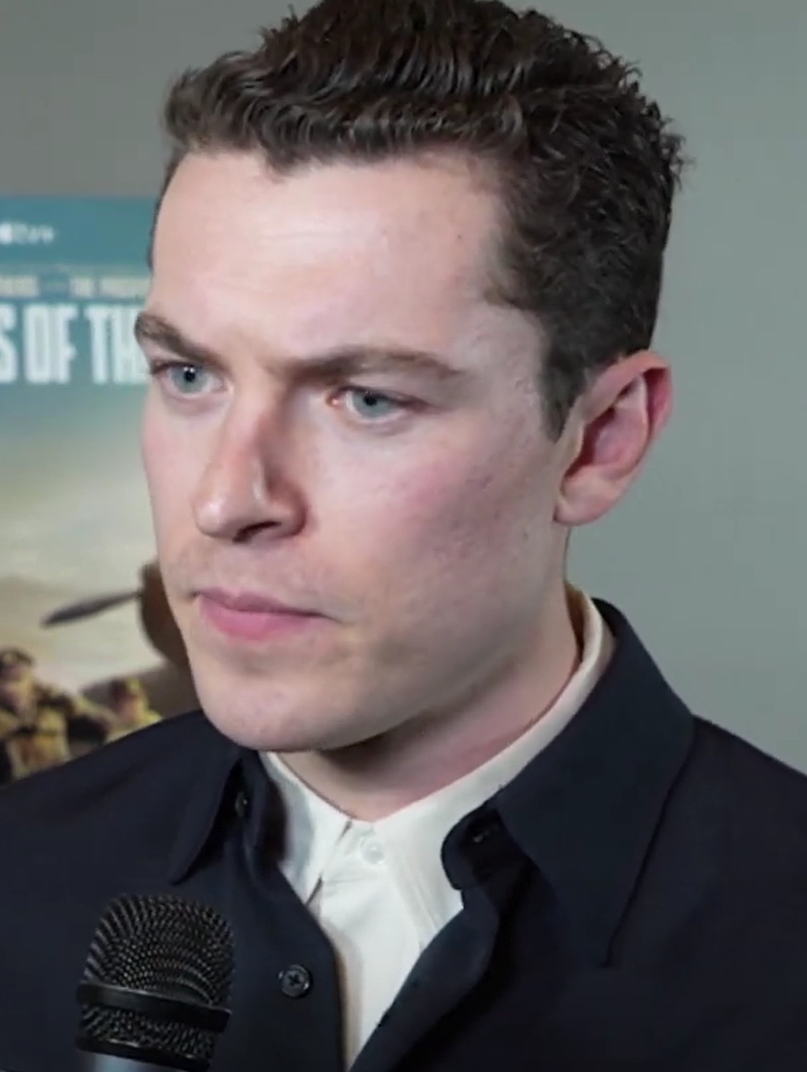
- Nate Mann in 2024
- Born: October 1, 1996 (age 30)
- Occupation: Actor
- Years active: 2019–present
- Known for: Masters of the Air

Nate Mann (born October 1, 1996) is an American actor.

Mann attended Germantown Academy, graduating in 2015. He first studied acting at Walnut Street Theatre, and then at the Juilliard School, earning a Bachelor of Fine Arts degree in 2019.

Mann made his stage debut in an Off-Broadway production of Little Women, directed by Kate Hamill.

In 2021, Mann was cast to star in the Apple TV+ miniseries Masters of the Air, and also appears in the Paul Thomas Anderson film Licorice Pizza. In June 2023, he joined the cast of the miniseries Apples Never Fall in a recurring role.

In September 2024, it was announced Mann was cast as Philip Randall in The Up and Comer, a thriller based on the novel by Howard Roughan.

== Personal life ==
Mann grew up in Rydal, Pennsylvania. He is Jewish on his father's side.

== Filmography ==
=== Film ===
Year	Title	Role	Notes
2021	Licorice Pizza	Brian	
2023	Ex-Husbands	Otto	
2026	Act One	Henry	

=== Television ===
Year	Title	Role	Notes
2020	Ray Donovan	Young Ray Donovan	3 episodes
2022	Evil	Henry Trezza	1 episode
2024	Masters of the Air	Major Robert "Rosie" Rosenthal	Miniseries, 6 episodes
2024	Apples Never Fall	Simon Barrington	Miniseries, 6 episodes
2026	Honey †	Kurt Fischer	Upcoming series

=== Stage ===
Year	Title	Role	Theatre
2019	Little Women	Laurie Laurence	Primary Stages
2020	A Soldier's Play	Lieutenant Byrd	American Airlines Theatre
2026	Birthright	Emerson	MCC Theater, Off-Broadway
