= Dark Hollow (film) =

- Theatrical release poster
- Directed by: Daniel Byers
- Screenplay by: Daniel Byers
- Produced by: Daniel Byers; Zachary Ludescher; Justin Herman; George Henry Horton; Ryan Scaringe; Jonathan Bloch; Will Pinke
- Starring: June Shreiner; David Garelik; J. Stephen Brantley; Brennon Weese; Ian Deighan; Jonathan Spivey; Sean Michael Wilkinson; Sharon Murray
- Edited by: Jacob Serlen
- Music by: Jordan Dykstra
- Production companies: Dark Tower Films; Dark Atlantic; Dakoit Pictures; Storm and Sand; Kinogo Pictures
- Distributed by: Brainstorm Media
- Release date: September 4, 2026
- Country: United States
- Language: English

Dark Hollow is a 2026 American horror film written and directed by Daniel Byers. Starring June Shreiner and David Garelik, the film follows a young mother who confronts a creature that emerges from an Appalachian coal mine and threatens her family. The film was released in select theaters and on video on demand on September 4, 2026, by Brainstorm Media.

== Premise ==
When a nightmarish creature emerges from the depths of an Appalachian coal mine, a young mother sets out to hunt it down in order to protect her home and family.

== Cast ==
- June Shreiner as KC Scarbro
- David Garelik as Jesse
- J. Stephen Brantley as Bo Brown
- Brennon Weese as Cricket
- Ian Deighan as Chase
- Jonathan Spivey as Lawson
- Sean Michael Wilkinson as Eli
- Sharon Murray as Meemaw

== Release ==
Dark Hollow was released in select theaters and on video on demand on September 4, 2026, with Brainstorm Media handling distribution.

The film's official trailer was released in August 2026 and received coverage from several horror publications. Rue Morgue premiered an exclusive trailer, describing the film as an Appalachian monster story. Dread Central characterized the film as an "old-school monster movie" and noted its apparent use of a practical creature suit. Bloody Disgusting also covered the film's trailer and release.
