= Tim de Zarn =

American actor

Tim DeZarn
- Born: Timothy Joseph DeZarn; July 11, 1952 (age 74); Cincinnati, Ohio, U.S.
- Occupation: Actor
- Years active: 1985–present
- Children: 2

Timothy Joseph DeZarn (born July 11, 1952, in Cincinnati, Ohio) is an American actor who has appeared in film and television. Alternately credited as deZarn, he is often cast in supporting roles in the horror, crime, and science fiction genres.

DeZarn's motion picture credits include Spider-Man (playing Mary Jane Watson's father), Fight Club, Live Free or Die Hard, The Cabin in the Woods, Untraceable, and Demon Knight.

DeZarn has appeared in several American television series, including Dr. Quinn, Medicine Woman, CSI, NYPD Blue, the various Star Trek TV franchises, Prime Suspect, Mad Men, The Forgotten, Lost, Criminal Minds, Weeds, Prison Break, Deadwood, The Shield, Cold Case, Quantum Leap, 7th Heaven, and Sons of Anarchy.

== Early life ==
Tim DeZarn was born on July 11, 1952. DeZarn went to Archbishop McNicholas High School, a Catholic school in Anderson Township, Ohio. He did not pursue a professional acting career until he was 25 years old.

== Career ==
His first broadcast role was on the TV series The Equalizer in 1986. His first film role was in the 1989 action comedy Three Fugitives.

DeZarn made several appearances as Army Sergeant Dixon on the television series Dr. Quinn, Medicine Woman. He played the recurring character George Putnam in season two of NYPD Blue. He appeared in five episodes of Deadwood on HBO. DeZarn appeared in Sons of Anarchy as Nate Meineke, the leader of a local state militia and terrorist group. He appeared in sci-fi horror film Project Dorothy (directed by George Henry Horton) in 2019.

== Personal life ==
DeZarn lives in Los Angeles with his wife and daughter. His 18-year-old son Travis was killed in an auto accident in 2007.

== Filmography ==
=== Film ===
Tim de Zarn film credits
Year	Title	Role	Notes
1989	Three Fugitives	First Officer	
1991	Ricochet	Skinhead	
1991	The Killing Mind	Gordon Atherton	
1992	Rage and Honor	Eddie 'Fast Eddie'	
1992	South Central	'Buddha'	
1995	Demon Knight	Homer	
1996	Scene of the Crime	Mackey	
1999	Fight Club	Inspector Bird	
2002	Spider-Man	Philip Watson	
2006	The Texas Chainsaw Massacre: The Beginning	Slaughterhouse Owner	
2007	Live Free or Die Hard	Police Sergeant	
2008	Untraceable	Herbert Miller	
2012	The Cabin in the Woods	Mordecai, The Harbinger	
2013	Halfway to Hell	Cliff	
2017	Christmas Eve	Barrett Hill	
2018	The Ballad of Buster Scruggs	Mean-Eyed Card Player	
2019	Project Dorothy	James	
2019	Acts of Desperation	Maynard	Best Ensemble Cast, Special Award of Distinction - Culver City Film Fest; Best Ensemble - Grove Film Festival
2021	Wrong Turn	Nate Roades	

=== Television ===
Tim de Zarn television credits
Year	Title	Role	Air date	Notes
1986	The Equalizer	Stoller	1986-10-08	"Prelude" (S2.E1)
1991	Quantum Leap	Stan	1991-05-08	"Heart of a Champion — July 23, 1955" (S3.E20)
1993	Dr. Quinn, Medicine Woman	Sergeant Dixon	1993-03-13	"The Prisoner" (S1.E11)
1993	Star Trek: The Next Generation	Satler	1993-03-29	"Starship Mine" (S6.E18)
1995	Star Trek: Voyager	Haliz	1995-09-04	"Initiations" (S2.E2)
1995	NYPD Blue	George Putnam	1995-01-10; 1995-01-17; 1995-02-28	3 episodes "In the Butt, Bob" (S2.E10) "Vishy-Vashy-Vinny" (S2.E11) "Bombs Away" (S2.E15)
1996	Seinfeld	Salesman	1996-02-15	"The Shower Head" (S7.E16)
1996	Pacific Blue	Willoughby	1996-05-11	"The Phoenix" (S1.E11)
1997	Beyond Belief: Fact or Fiction	Raymond Michael Edmondson		"The Electric Chair" (S1.E1b)
1997	Gun		1997-05-03	"Columbus Day" (S1.E1)
1997	Alien Nation: The Udara Legacy	Leonard Guini	1997-07-29	TV movie
1998	Star Trek: Deep Space Nine	Halb Daier	1998-04-01	"Wrongs Darker than Death or Night" (S6.E17)
2000	CSI: Crime Scene Investigation	Red Carlton	2000-10-13	"Cool Change" (S1.E2)
2001	Star Trek: Voyager	Yediq	2001-01-21	"Repentance" (S7.E13)
2004–2006	Deadwood	Soldier / Deserter Prospector		4 episodes "Sold Under Sin" (S1.E12) "Tell Your God to Ready for Blood" (S3.E1) "I Am Not the Fine Man You Take Me For" (S3.E2) "Full Faith and Credit"(S3.E4) "Amateur Night" (S3.E9)
2006	Prison Break	Salty Vet	2006-11-27	"The Killing Box" (S2.E13)
2007	Monk	Max Barton	2007-09-07	"Mr. Monk and the Wrong Man" (S6.E8)
2008	Sons of Anarchy	Nate Meineke	2008-10-08	"AK-51" (S1.E6)
2009	Lost	Trevor	2009-04-15	"Some Like It Hoth" (S5.E13)
2010	Mad Men	Jim Anderson, Life Cereal executive	2010-08-29	"Waldorf Stories" (S4.E6)
2012	Justified	Detective Dempsey	2012-03-06	"Watching the Detectives" (S3.E8)
2012	Agent Carter	George	2015-01-27	"The Blitzkrieg Button" (S1.E4)
2020	Better Call Saul	Mr. Harkness	2020-03-09	"Namaste" (S5.E4)
