= Victor Villanueva (director) =

Filipino director

- Born: Philippines
- Occupation: Director
- Years active: 2010–present
- Notable work: Patay na si Hesus; I Am Not Big Bird

Victor Kaiba Villanueva is a Filipino director best known for his comedic films. His notable works include Patay na si Hesus (2016), which was featured in the inaugural Pista ng Pelikulang Pilipino, and I Am Not Big Bird (2024). Villanueva also gained recognition for directing the youth-oriented mini-series Beach Bros (2022).

Villanueva's accolades include a special mention at the Cinemanila International Film Festival, a NETPAC Award for Best Short Film at the QCinema International Film Festival, and the Special Jury Prize at the 1st Pista ng Pelikulang Pilipino.

== Early life ==
Victor Kaiba Villanueva was born in Davao and raised in Cebu. He studied Fine Arts Advertising at the University of San Carlos-Talamban Campus, where he took video editing courses. This sparked his passion for film, leading him to co-produce Jerrold Tarog’s debut feature, Confessional, before moving to Manila.

== Filmography ==
=== Film ===
Year	Title	Director	Writer	Producer	Notes
2011	My Paranormal Romance	Yes	No	No	Also visual effects (graphics) and poster design
2011	Saranghae My Tutor	Yes	No	Yes	
2012	Abot Kamay	Yes	No	No	Short film
2014	Ang Nanay ni Justin Bieber	Yes	Yes	No	Short film
2017	Patay na si Hesus	Yes	No	No	Also storyboard artist and poster designer
2018	Kusina Kings	Yes	Yes	No	Story and screenplay
2019	Lucid	Yes	No	No	Also bit role
2022	Boy Bastos	Yes	Story	No	Guest role (Layno's boyfriend)
2023	Kidnap for Romance	Yes	No	No	
2024	I Am Not Big Bird	Yes	No	No	

=== Television ===
Year	Title	Role	Notes	Ref.
2018	Doors	Director, Second Unit Director	Episode 5 (Director), Episode 10 (SUD)	
2019	Touch Screen	Director	Episode 1: "Inday vs Vixee"	
2019	Jhon En Martian	Director		
2022	Regal Studio Presents	Director	Season 3, Episode 5: My Third Wish	
2022	Beach Bros	Director	TV miniseries	
2022	Ang Babae sa Likod ng Facemask	Director		
2023	Ang Lalaki sa Likod ng Profile	Director and writer		
2025	Golden Scenery of Tomorrow	Director	Web series	

== Accolades ==
Awards and nominations received by Victor Villanueva
Awards and Nominations
Organization	Year	Nominated Work	Category	Result	Ref.
Cinemanila International Film Festival	2011	Saranghae My Tutor	Best Short Film	Nominated	
Cinemanila International Film Festival	2011	Saranghae My Tutor	Best Short Film - Special Mention	Won	
Cinema One Originals Digital Film Festival	2011	My Paranormal Romance	Best Picture	Nominated	
Cinema One Originals Digital Film Festival	2011	My Paranormal Romance	Special Mention	Won	
Cinema One Originals Digital Film Festival	2019	Lucid	Best Picture	Nominated	
Cinema One Originals Digital Film Festival	2019	Lucid	Best Director	Nominated	
Pista ng Pelikulang Pilipino	2017	Patay na si Hesus	Main Section Special Jury Prize	Won	
PMPC Star Awards for Movies	2017	Patay na si Hesus	Indie Movie Director of the Year	Nominated	
QCinema International Film Festival	2014	Ang Nanay ni Justin Bieber	Audience Choice Award	Won	
QCinema International Film Festival	2014	Ang Nanay ni Justin Bieber	Best Short Film NETPAC Award	Won	
QCinema International Film Festival	2016	Patay na si Hesus	Best Picture - Circle Competition Pylon Award	Nominated	
QCinema International Film Festival	2016	Patay na si Hesus	Circle Competition Audience Choice Award	Won	
Young Critics Circle	2011	Ang Damgo ni Eleuteria	Best Achievement in Cinematography and Visual Design (shared with Christian Linaban, Kaloy Uypuanco, and Syrel Lopez)	Nominated	
