= Scream Queens season 1 =

Scream Queens
- Season 1
- Promotional poster and home media cover art
- Starring: Emma Roberts; Skyler Samuels; Lea Michele; Glen Powell; Diego Boneta; Abigail Breslin; Keke Palmer; Oliver Hudson; Nasim Pedrad; Lucien Laviscount; Billie Lourd; Jamie Lee Curtis
- No. of episodes: 13

Release
- Original network: Fox
- Original release: September 22 – December 8, 2015

Season chronology
- Next → Season 2

The first season of the black comedy slasher television series Scream Queens originally aired on Fox in the United States. It premiered on September 22, 2015 and concluded on December 8, 2015. The season consists of 13 episodes.

The first season takes place at the fictional college campus of Wallace University. One of the sororities, Kappa Kappa Tau, becomes plagued by a serial killer, who uses the university's Red Devil mascot as a disguise.

The season stars Emma Roberts, Skyler Samuels, Lea Michele, Glen Powell, Diego Boneta, Abigail Breslin, Keke Palmer, Oliver Hudson, Nasim Pedrad, Lucien Laviscount, Billie Lourd, and Jamie Lee Curtis.

== Cast ==
=== Main ===
- Emma Roberts as Chanel Oberlin
- Skyler Samuels as Grace Gardner
- Lea Michele as Hester Ulrich / Hester Doyle / Chanel #6 / Red Devil #3
- Glen Powell as Chad Radwell
- Diego Boneta as Pete Martinez / Red Devil #4
- Abigail Breslin as Libby Puttney / Chanel #5
- Keke Palmer as Zayday Williams
- Oliver Hudson as Weston "Wes" Gardner
- Nasim Pedrad as Gigi Caldwell / Jess Meyer / Red Devil #1
- Lucien Laviscount as Earl Grey
- Billie Lourd as Sadie Swenson / Chanel #3
- Jamie Lee Curtis as Dean Cathy Munsch

=== Special guest stars ===
- Niecy Nash as Denise Hemphill
- Ariana Grande as Sonya Herfmann / Chanel #2
- Nick Jonas as Boone Clemens / Red Devil #2
- Chad Michael Murray as Brad Radwell

=== Recurring ===
- Breezy Eslin as Jennifer
- Jeanna Han as Sam
- Aaron Rhodes as Roger
- Austin Rhodes as Dodger
- Evan Paley as Caulfield Mount Herman
- Anna Grace Barlow as Bethany Stevens / Mary Mulligan
- Grace Phipps as Mandy Greenwell
- Jim Klock as Detective Chisolm
- Jan Hoag as Ms. Agatha Bean

=== Guest ===
- McKaley Miller as Sophia Doyle
- Chelsea Ricketts as Amy Meyer
- Anna Margaret Collins as Coco Cohen
- Brianne Howey as Melanie Dorkus
- Whitney Meyer as Tiffany DeSalle / Deaf Taylor Swift
- Julia Duffy as Bunny Radwell
- Patrick Schwarzenegger as Thad Radwell
- Rachele Brooke Smith as Muffy St. Pierre-Radwell
- Faith Prince as Kristy Swenson
- Gary Grubbs as Mr. Swenson
- LB Brown as Freddy Swenson
- Wallace Langham as Mr. Putney
- Lara Grice as Mrs. Putney
- Jean Louisa Kelly as Delight Ulrich
- Steven Culp as Clark Ulrich

== Episodes ==
No. overall	No. in season	Title	Directed by	Written by	Original release date	Prod. code	US viewers (millions)
1	1	"Pilot"	Ryan Murphy	Ryan Murphy & Brad Falchuk & Ian Brennan	September 22, 2015	1AYD01	4.04
In 1995, at a Kappa Kappa Tau sorority party, a pledge (Sophia Doyle) dies after giving birth in a bathtub. In present day, Grace Gardner attends Wallace University and plans to join Kappa Kappa Tau to honor her mother, who was once a member. Dean Cathy Munsch attempts to shut down KKT, threatening to revoke the charter, due to president Chanel Oberlin's rude behavior and suspected assault on her predecessor, Melanie Dorkus. Kappa is forced to accept anyone who wishes to join; this lowers Chanel's popularity and her boyfriend, Chad Radwell, ends their relationship. Ms. Bean, Kappa's housemaid, is killed via deep fryer; her body is hidden in the house's storage freezer. Grace joins forces with Pete Martinez, an investigative reporter, to take down Chanel and restore KKT's reputation. Ms. Bean's body disappears and Chanel realizes something strange is going on. Chanel #2 decides to leave Wallace but is stabbed to death by a serial killer known as The Red Devil, who also beheads a pledge with a lawnmower.
2	2	"Hell Week"	Brad Falchuk	Ryan Murphy & Brad Falchuk & Ian Brennan	September 22, 2015	1AYD02	4.04
The pledges are encouraged to move into the Kappa house by Gigi, who assigns them a security guard, Denise Hemphill. Concerned with Grace's safety, her father, Wes Gardner, transfers to Wallace University, where he rejects Munsch's advances and builds a rapport with Gigi. Meanwhile, Grace and Pete develop a relationship, and Grace finds a secret room where the leaders of Kappa hide their greatest secrets, and learns that in 1995 a pledge bled to death due to the sisters' neglect after giving birth to a child, which then disappeared, and that Munsch supposedly covered up the incident. Grace finds the Red Devil costume in Pete's closet and becomes convinced he's both the killer and the child of the pledge that died 20 years prior. The Red Devil fatally stabs Denise's partner Shondell, slashes the throat of Boone, and leaves a threatening message to the Kappa sisters. Later at the campus morgue, the Red Devil rendezvous with Boone, who faked his death.
3	3	"Chainsaw"	Ian Brennan	Ian Brennan	September 29, 2015	1AYD03	3.46
Keen to boost her dwindling popularity, Chanel gives Hester a makeover and inducts her into the sorority as Chanel #6. Chanel #3 grows close to Sam and tells her a family secret: Charles Manson is her father. Grace, Zayday, and Denise discover bloodstains in Chanel #2's bedroom and believe she has been murdered, but learn that she is still posting pictures to her Instagram. The trio visit Chanel #2's parents in Bel Air, who divulge that Chanel #2, whose name is Sonya, was dating Chad. Denise is convinced that there are two Red Devils, Zayday being one of them, while Grace believes Chad is responsible. The Red Devil is goaded into fighting The Dickie Dollar Scholars, who are convinced that Boone's 'suicide' was actually murder. However, confronted by two chainsaw-wielding Red Devils, the scholars are outplayed, resulting in Caulfield losing both his arms. Dean Munsch and Gigi decide to move into the Kappa house temporarily to protect the girls. Irritated by Dean Munsch's white noise machine, Gigi decides to sleep downstairs, where she is confronted by a chainsaw-wielding Red Devil. Aided by Wes, Gigi manages to evade the attack.
4	4	"Haunted House"	Bradley Buecker	Brad Falchuk	October 6, 2015	1AYD04	2.97
Zayday announces her candidacy for Kappa president and decides to campaign by throwing a charity haunted house at an abandoned shack on Shady Lane. Denise, still adamant Zayday is the murderer, refuses to allow her to throw the party, but later backs off when Zayday reveals that she knows Denise is a former Kappa reject, and thus a possible suspect. Grace and Pete speak to the sole survivor of the 'bathtub incident' of 1995, Mandy Greenwell. She tells them that after the baby's mother died, Dean Munsch took care of the situation, enlisting Mandy and her friends to bury the corpse, and taking the baby to an unknown location. Mandy also reveals that the baby was a girl. As punishment for talking, The Red Devil fatally stabs Mandy. Hester starts seducing Chad, and the pair head to the Shady Lane shack to have sex, but find the dead bodies of Ms Bean, Chanel #2, Shondell, Coney, and Mandy. Grace investigates the case of 'The Hag of Shady Lane', the former resident of the abandoned shack, learning that she was taking care of the bath tub baby in 1995. It is then revealed that the hag is Gigi.
5	5	"Pumpkin Patch"	Brad Falchuk	Brad Falchuk	October 13, 2015	1AYD05	2.39
Chanel's plan to throw a pumpkin patch party to gain popularity and undermine Zayday's presidential campaign is thwarted when Dean Munsch closes the university campus and institutes a curfew on Halloween night. Hester begins wreaking havoc with the sorority, getting Chanel arrested for Ms Bean's murder and claiming that Chanel #5 went to the police. After her brief stint in prison, Chanel throws the pumpkin patch party anyway, and forces Chanel #5 to light all of the pumpkins with her boyfriends, Roger and Dodger. When lighting the pumpkins, they are attacked by The Red Devil, who manages to disembowel Dodger. Meanwhile, Zayday manages to escape The Red Devil by stabbing him in the hand with a fork. Grace, Pete, Wes, Gigi, and Denise also find The Red Devil's secret lair, where Gigi manages to taser The Red Devil, however they escape down a laundry chute before their identity is revealed. Back at the house, Chanel tries to call the presidential election early due to Zayday and Grace's absences, however they both return and the sorority casts their votes. Later that night, Gigi has a rendezvous with The Red Devil and is revealed to be the one in charge.
6	6	"Seven Minutes in Hell"	Michael Uppendahl	Ryan Murphy	October 20, 2015	1AYD06	2.59
After a tie in the presidential vote, Chanel opts to cede her presidency to Zayday in an attempt to survive. For her first act as new sorority president, Zayday decides to throw a Kappa slumber party in the house, however the sisters soon discover that the house's doors and windows have all been locked from the outside. Chanel summons Chad and the rest of the Dickie Dollar Scholars to rescue her, only for Caulfield to be slaughtered with an axe by The Red Devil outside the house. The girls then play a game of Truth Or Dare to try to determine who the killer is, which ends with Sam revealing that Chanel #3's father is Charles Manson. Angered but confused by her feelings for Sam, Chanel #3 orders her to take a nap in the bloody Kappa bathtub, where Sam is asphyxiated by The Red Devil. Soon after, Roger is murdered with a nailgun, and Chad discovers a series of secret passageways underneath the house. Chanel and Zayday venture down, and are confronted by The Red Devil, and escape after Chanel knocks him unconscious.
7	7	"Beware of Young Girls"	Barbara Brown	Ryan Murphy	November 3, 2015	1AYD07	2.44
The members of Kappa Kappa Tau and the Dickie Dollar Scholars attend Chanel #2's memorial service, where Chanel delivers a scathing eulogy. Chanels #3, #5, and #6 bring a ouija board to Kappa so that Chanel and Chanel #2 can bury the hatchet. During the seance, Chanel #2 claims that Chanel is the killer, terrifying the minions into plotting Chanel's murder. However, during a fever dream, Chanel is visited by Chanel #2 who warns her of the impending murder plot in an attempt to get herself promoted out of Hell. Chanel forgives her minions and recruits them to help her prove that Grace and Zayday are the killers. Meanwhile, Gigi tries to manipulate Grace into investigating a former Kappa member named Feather McCarthy, who ran away with Professor Munsch, Cathy's ex-husband, who is then murdered and dismembered in his home. Cathy is arrested and later strikes up a quid pro quo deal with Grace and Pete that they agree to and they soon discover DNA evidence proving that Feather killed Professor Munsch. Detective Chisholm becomes convinced that Feather is also responsible for The Red Devil killings and has her locked in the institution. It is revealed that Dean Munsch killed her ex-husband and framed Feather for it.
8	8	"Mommie Dearest"	Michael Uppendahl	Ian Brennan	November 10, 2015	1AYD08	2.51
Munsch reneges on her deal with Grace, refusing to say anything about the bathtub baby. At home, she is attacked in her shower by two Red Devils and an unknown third perpetrator in a Justice Scalia mask, but she evades them. Munsch reluctantly tells Grace that Sophia Doyle was the girl who died after giving birth, but Grace is still convinced that she is the bathtub baby. Grace and Pete attempt to figure out who Sophia Doyle was, returning to the mental asylum and discovering Gigi was taking care of two children at the asylum twenty years ago. The Red Devil kills Jennifer and melts wax over her corpse, prompting the immediate closure of the university indefinitely. Meanwhile, the minions employ Denise to prove that Zayday and Grace are the killers, and Chanel recruits two Scotland Yard detectives to look into the pair as well. Grace returns to the Kappa house, where Chanel tells her all about her mother, Mary Mulligan; a violent drug dealer who repeatedly drove drunk with Grace in the car. Grace confronts her father, warning him to stay away from her, claiming that she is her mother's daughter. Boone works out at a local gym while wearing a disguise and speaks on the phone to an unknown person about Gigi's ridiculous Justice Scalia mask and decides that Gigi needs to be taken out.
9	9	"Ghost Stories"	Michael Uppendahl	Ryan Murphy	November 17, 2015	1AYD09	2.37
Chanel informs the minions that Chad has invited her to Thanksgiving at his family's compound, infuriating Hester, who fakes a pregnancy to goad Chad into admitting that he has been having sex with Hester behind Chanel's back. Meanwhile, Boone returns to campus in order to kill Gigi and seduce Zayday, with whom he is in love. After realizing that Boone was her Red Devil captor, Zayday rebuffs him due to her loving Earl. In a fit of jealous rage, Boone stabs Earl on the Kappa lawn. Denise realizes that the girls are terrified that they will be the next victim, and so tells them a variety of ghost stories to calm their nerves. Chanel #5 flees the house in her car, only to avoid the attacks of a Red Devil and returns to the house. Grace continues her investigation into the bathtub incident, and learns from Dean Munsch that Sophia gave birth to two children – a boy and a girl – and that Boone is the male child. Boone summons Gigi so that he can kill her but the other Red Devil kills Boone instead. Chad decides that the honourable thing to do is to invite the mother of his child to Thanksgiving. The minions trick Hester into revealing that her pregnancy was a fake ploy and Chanel pushes Hester down the Kappa staircase.
10	10	"Thanksgiving"	Michael Lehmann	Brad Falchuk	November 24, 2015	1AYD10	1.98
Chanel confides in Chad that she murdered Hester, but when she goes to show Chad the body, it has disappeared. Chanel #3 attends her family Thanksgiving, but quickly departs and returns to the Kappa house to find Grace, Zayday, and Dean Munsch preparing dinner. Grace allows Wes to join them, and when Chanel #5 also returns to the house, Dean Munsch suggests that the survivors posit their Red Devil killer theories. Gigi and the remaining Red Devil also spend Thanksgiving together, while Chad and Chanel's Thanksgiving with the Radwells is halted by the arrival of Hester. Dean Munsch and Chanel #3 believe that each other is the killer, while Wes admits that he believes it is Grace. Pete arrives at the Kappa Thanksgiving, and reveals that Wes is the biological father of Boone, and likely the father of the remaining Red Devil. After being humiliated and bullied by the Radwells, Chanel and Hester return to the Kappa house, with Chad in tow, just in time for dinner. All of the survivors sit down to dinner, but are horrified to find Gigi's severed head on the platter instead of the turkey.
11	11	"Black Friday"	Barbara Brown	Ian Brennan	December 1, 2015	1AYD11	2.40
The Chanels go shopping on Black Friday, but The Red Devil attacks and manages to maim Chanel. Wes, Pete, and Grace go to the police to report Gigi's death and find that the entire police department has been fired due to wasting resources, and that Denise has been appointed the new Chief of Police. Chad reveals to Pete that Boone left most of his possessions to him, despite the fact that they barely knew each other. Pete admits that Boone was his source for a story about the negative effects of the Greek system. Recovering from her injury, Chanel decides that the only appropriate course of action is to murder Dean Munsch who is assumed by everyone to be the killer. Munsch survives both an attempted poisoning and thirty minutes in a cryogenic stall. Pete enlists Wes to help investigate Gigi's past, and discover that her birth name was Jess Meyer, the sister of Amy, who committed suicide after her role in the bathtub incident. Pete decides to flee the campus and Grace intervenes, telling him she wants to have sex with him, but he protests saying that he doesn't want Grace to lose her virginity to a murderer.
12	12	"Dorkus"	Bradley Buecker	Ryan Murphy & Brad Falchuk & Ian Brennan	December 8, 2015	1AYD12	2.53
Pete admits to Grace that he was part of the Red Devil scheme, claiming responsibility for the murders of Roger, Chanel, Boone, and the attempted murder of Chanel. Grace is disgusted and tries to leave, but Pete piques her interest with the identity of the remaining Red Devil; he is fatally stabbed before he can talk. The public turns on Chanel after an email goes viral. A pizza delivery guy is forced to impersonate the Red Devil, with a dynamite vest strapped to his chest which explodes in the Kappa house. Chanel considers suicide, but Zayday convinces her to reform herself. She begins by visiting Melanie Dorkus' house for a fake apology; Hester robs Chanel's closet and Chanel #5 leaves for a Tinder date. Chanel attempts to stab Melanie with scissors, convinced she is the killer, before Grace and Zayday proclaim that Hester is the Red Devil. Grace, Zayday, Chanel, and Chanel #3 return to Kappa, finding Chanel #5 in the bathroom, and Hester with a stiletto heel jammed into her eye socket. As Hester is being taken to the hospital she claims Chanel #5 attacked her.
13	13	"The Final Girl(s)"	Brad Falchuk	Ryan Murphy & Brad Falchuk & Ian Brennan	December 8, 2015	1AYD13	2.53
In 2016, Kappa Kappa Tau has been rebuilt thanks to the efforts of president Zayday, vice-president Grace, and treasurer Hester. Dean Munsch is now a best-selling feminist author and is in a serious relationship with Wes. Chad sets up a foundation honoring his dead friends and ends his short-lived relationship with Denise. Hester reveals that she was the Red Devil and the biological daughter of Sophia Doyle and got away with all of her crimes. Having grown up in the asylum with Gigi and Boone, Hester soon became obsessed with exacting revenge on the people who took away her mother, and faked her scoliosis to distract people from her plans. When Munsch realizes that Hester is the murderer, she agrees to not talk after being blackmailed into turning her in for the coverup of Sofia and for murdering her husband, Steven. Back in December 2015, Hester survives the stiletto stabbing, having inflicted it on herself, manages to convince Denise that the three Chanels are all killers, and they are arrested. During their trial, Chanel, Chanel #3, and Chanel #5 are found innocent of all charges but the jury changes the verdict after Chanel insults the jury and they are sentenced to life in the mental asylum. But the Chanels are having a fun time in the asylum. One night, Chanel is awoken in the middle of the night by a knife-wielding Red Devil.

== Casting ==
"It's Mean Girls meets Friday the 13th. I think it's laugh-out-loud funny, it's edge-of-your-seat scary and everyone is wearing Chanel. What other reasons do you need [to watch]?"

— Lead actress Emma Roberts on the series

In December 2014, it was reported that Emma Roberts and Jamie Lee Curtis would be featured as series regulars. In January 2015, Lea Michele, Keke Palmer, and Abigail Breslin joined the series' main cast, as well as actress/singer Ariana Grande in a recurring capacity. Later that month, The Hollywood Reporter confirmed that Nick Jonas would recur throughout the first season. In February 2015, newcomer Billie Lourd and Skyler Samuels joined the series' main cast. Later in the month, Niecy Nash joined the recurring cast as Denise, a kick-butt security guard, as well as British actor Lucien Laviscount, Diego Boneta and Glen Powell being confirmed as regulars. In March, Nasim Pedrad was cast as a regular. On March 13, 2015, previously cast Joe Manganiello was forced to depart the series, due to publicity obligations for his film Magic Mike XXL. Oliver Hudson was hired as his replacement. On June 24, 2015, it was announced that Charisma Carpenter and Roger Bart would portray Chanel #2's (Ariana Grande) parents. In August 2015, Philip Casnoff was cast as Cathy's (Jamie Lee Curtis) husband. In September 2015, series co-creator Ryan Murphy announced, through his Twitter feed, that Patrick Schwarzenegger had joined the cast. He portrayed Chad Radwell's (Glen Powell) younger brother, Thad. His older brother, Brad, was portrayed by Chad Michael Murray, while Alan Thicke and Julia Duffy were cast as their parents Mr. and Mrs. Radwell: all appearing in the "Thanksgiving episode".

== Reception ==
=== Critical response ===
The first season of Scream Queens received mixed to positive reviews from critics. The review aggregator Rotten Tomatoes gave the first season a 68% of approval with an average rating of 6.35/10, based on 148 reviews. The site's critical consensus reads: "Too tasteless for mainstream viewers and too silly for horror enthusiasts, Scream Queens fails to satisfy." On Metacritic, the season was given a score of 59 out of 100, based on 33 critics, indicating "mixed or average" reviews.

IGN reviewer Terri Schwartz gave a very positive review of the two-hour premiere, giving it a 9.7 out of 10 and saying "Ryan Murphy has worked his TV magic again with a killer start to Scream Queens. From the acting to the costuming to the writing, everything about this concept and execution works. Scream Queens is as funny and self-aware as it needs to be to not bore audiences, but also offers up enough mystery and intrigue to keep even the biggest skeptic entertained." The Telegraph also gave a positive review, awarding the show four stars out of five. They commented that the show pummels "the viewer into submission with sheer, rictus-grinning relentlessness" and praised it for being "shiny, gory and whip-smart."

Robert Rorke of The New York Post panned the series, later putting it on his list of 10 worst TV shows of 2015 and criticized Roberts' performance, saying that she "can't act".

=== Ratings ===
No.	Episode	Air date	Rating/share (18–49)	Viewers (millions)	DVR (18–49)	DVR viewers (millions)	Total (18–49)	Total viewers (millions)
1	"Pilot"	September 22, 2015	1.7/5	4.04	1.4	3.02	3.1	7.06
2	"Hell Week"	September 22, 2015	1.7/5	4.04	1.4	3.02	3.1	7.06
3	"Chainsaw"	September 29, 2015	1.4/5	3.46	1.3	2.51	2.7	5.98
4	"Haunted House"	October 6, 2015	1.2/4	2.97	0.9	1.93	2.1	4.89
5	"Pumpkin Patch"	October 13, 2015	1.0/3	2.39	0.8	1.77	1.8	4.16
6	"Seven Minutes in Hell"	October 20, 2015	1.0/3	2.59	0.7	1.57	1.7	4.16
7	"Beware of Young Girls"	November 3, 2015	1.0/3	2.44	0.8	1.67	1.8	4.11
8	"Mommie Dearest"	November 10, 2015	0.9/3	2.51	0.8	1.67	1.7	4.18
9	"Ghost Stories"	November 17, 2015	0.9/3	2.37	0.8	1.69	1.7	4.06
10	"Thanksgiving"	November 24, 2015	0.8/3	1.98	1.0	1.97	1.8	3.95
11	"Black Friday"	December 1, 2015	0.9/3	2.40	0.8	1.57	1.7	3.96
12	"Dorkus"	December 8, 2015	0.9/3	2.53	0.7	1.39	1.6	3.92
13	"The Final Girl(s)"	December 8, 2015	0.9/3	2.53	0.7	1.39	1.6	3.92

== Home media ==
Scream Queens – The Complete First Season
Set Details		Special Features
13 Episodes; 4 Disc Set; English 5.1 Dolby Digital; Subtitles: English SDH, Spanish, French; Runtime: 570 Minutes		Rush Kappa; Between 2 Queens; Style Queens
Release Dates
Region 1	Region 2	Region 4
December 6, 2016	September 26, 2016	December 16, 2016
