= Haunted House (Scream Queens) =

- Scream Queens episode
- Episode no.: Season 1 Episode 4
- Directed by: Bradley Buecker
- Written by: Brad Falchuk
- Production code: 1AYD04
- Original air date: October 6, 2015
- Running time: 44 minutes

Guest appearances
- Ariana Grande as Chanel #2/Sonya Herfmann; Niecy Nash as Denise Hemphill; Jan Hoag as Ms. Agatha Bean; Breezy Eslin as Jennifer "Candle Vlogger"; Chelsea Ricketts as Amy; Anna Grace Barlow as Bethany; Grace Phipps as Mandy; McKaley Miller as Sophia; Jennifer Aspen as Older Mandy Greenwell; Jeanna Han as Sam "Predatory Lez"; Anna Margaret as Coco; Jim Clock as Detective Chisolm; Deneen Tyler as Shondell Washington

Episode chronology
← Previous "Chainsaw"	Next → "Pumpkin Patch"

"Haunted House" is the fourth episode of the horror black comedy series Scream Queens. It was first aired on October 6, 2015, on Fox. The episode was directed by Bradley Buecker and was written by Brad Falchuk. In this episode, as Halloween approaches, Zayday (Keke Palmer) makes a stunning announcement and in response, Chanel (Emma Roberts) concocts a devious plan. Pete (Diego Boneta) and Grace (Skyler Samuels) visit a mysterious woman connected to Kappa's past. And as Hester (Lea Michele) starts to grow closer to Chad (Glen Powell), Dean Munsch (Jamie Lee Curtis) struggles to keep Wallace University open after the whole murder spree by the Red Devil.

The episode was watched by 2.97 million viewers and received mixed reviews from critics.

== Plot ==
The episode opens with Chanel (Emma Roberts) talking about "Chanel-o-ween", where she gives her Instagram followers presents in celebration of Halloween. Some footage shows the girls receiving their present with their reactions being filmed. Some of the presents include a box filled with blood, a box of moths and apples with razors inside of them.

Detective Chisolm (Jim Clock) is interviewing Dean Cathy Munsch (Jamie Lee Curtis), asking if she saw the Red Devil enter the house. Wes (Oliver Hudson) and Gigi (Nasim Pedrad) argue that she's the killer. Denise (Niecy Nash) rushes into the house and tells everyone about the attempted murder of Caulfield (Evan Paley) and says when they get fingerprints from the chainsaw that they'll find them to be Zayday (Keke Palmer)'s. Meanwhile, Grace (Skyler Samuels) and Pete (Diego Boneta) drive to a trailer which is owned by Mandy who tells them what happened 20 years ago. In a flashback to 1995, Mandy and her sorority sisters are forced to wear hoods while Cathy drives to a location to bury Sophia (McKaley Miller)'s body. Cathy tells them to leave the university immediately and never contact each other again. Then they throw her body in the hole. Back in the present, Mandy says one of the sisters killed herself, another was institutionalized and another made it into FOX News. She then reveals that the bathtub baby is a girl, much to Grace's confusion as she believed the Red Devil was Chad Radwell (Glen Powell). Later that night, Mandy is watching a horror movie when someone knocks on her door, she grabs a baseball bat and opens the door to find no one there. Soon she hears knocking from outside all around the caravan. She turns on the light and while looking in the mirror she sees the Red Devil pull out a knife behind her as she is heard screaming.

At the coffee shop, Earl (Lucien Laviscount) tells Zayday that he heard that she was running for president and gives her advice. Later on in Kappa house, Zayday announces she's running for Kappa president against Chanel, which angers her and makes her vow vendetta. In her closet, Chanel, Chanel #5 (Abigail Breslin) and Chanel #3 (Billie Lourd) decide to have their own Pumpkin Patch to undermine Zayday's candidacy. During lunchtime at the university's cafeteria, Chanel and her minions are handing out flyers for their Pumpkin Patch and they run into a guy named Tommy (who is wearing a shirt with a Psi Theta Gamma fraternity) and his friends who make disrespectful remarks toward the ladies. Hester / Chanel #6 (Lea Michele) kicks Tommy in his groin area, leading the Chanels to beat them all up.

The next morning, in Wes's class, the class is watching another horror movie and afterwards Grace appears and confronts him about the bathtub baby and asking if her mom was Sophia. Before leaving, she says if she finds out he's the killer, she'll never speak to him again. When leaving the building, she receives a text from Pete to meet him at 53 Shady Lane. When she arrives, Pete scares her and soon Earl and Zayday scare him. When Grace asks what they're doing there, Zayday says she's having the haunted house charity for her presidential campaign there. Denise appears, startling them and says the house is haunted and she and Pete tell them the story of 'The Hag of Shady Lane', the former resident of the abandoned house, who took care of the bathtub baby in 1995. Still assuming Zayday is the killer, Denise refuses to allow Zayday to throw the party, but later backs off when Zayday reveals that she knows Denise was a former Kappa reject, and thus a possible suspect.

At night, Chad is about to masturbate to a tombstone in a graveyard when Hester appears. They both talk about their passion for death and soon Hester seduces him. He asks for them to have sex on a grave and she says it's not scary enough and says he might be lucky if he gets a text saying which scary location they should meet at. The next evening, Hester and Chad meet at the Shady Home to have sex, until Hester finds Ms. Bean (Jan Hoag)'s body, which they think at first is a wax replica. That is until Hester pokes the leg and they soon realize that it's her real body and start screaming and running and end up running into the bodies of Shondell (Deneen Tyler), Coney the university's latest mascot, Chanel #2 (Ariana Grande) and Mandy. Chad and Hester alert everyone about the bodies in the haunted house, but that only encourages them to go, which results in Zayday's haunted house being a success. At the Shady home, Zayday is suddenly kidnapped by the Red Devil. In the end, it is revealed that 'The Hag of Shady Lane' is Gigi.

== Production ==
At the day the series premiered on Fox, series creator Ryan Murphy revealed that there would be a three-part Halloween episodes, with this episode being the first one. On October 2, 2015, around a week before the episode aired, the video of Emma Roberts as Chanel Oberlin introducing Chanel-o-ween; that she's giving her Instagram fans presents in celebration of Halloween, visiting them, and the fans reactions, was released to promote the series as the Halloween approach. The video was inspired and a loose parody of Taylor Swift's 2014 Christmas themed video "Taylor Swift's Gift Giving of 2014". The video was used as this episode's opening sequence. Returning recurring character in this episode including special guest stars Ariana Grande and Niecy Nash as Chanel #2 / Sonya Herfmann, the deceased minion of Chanel Oberlin, and Denise Hemphill, the odd security guard. Other recurring guest stars includes Jan Hoag as Ms. Bean, Breezy Eslin as Jennifer "Candle Vlogger", Jeanna Han as Sam "Predatory Lez", Jim Clock as Detective Chisolm, and the characters from the 1995 flashbacks; Sophia (McKaley Miller), Amy (Chelsea Ricketts), Coco (Anna Margaret), Bethany (Anna Grace Barlow), and Mandy (Grace Phipps). Jennifer Aspen made a guest appearance as the older Mandy Greenwell, whom Grace and Pete visits to search the information of the bathtub baby.

== Reception ==
=== Ratings ===
Haunted House was watched live by 2.97 million U.S. viewers and got a 1.2 rating/4 share in the adult 18-49 demographic.

=== Critical reception ===
Haunted House received mixed review from critics. LaToya Ferguson from The A.V. Club gave the episode a D+ and cited "With [the previous episode], it looked like the show would slowly improve as the season went on. So watching Haunted House is like watching the erasure of that improvement, simply by being an even bigger mess than the show started with in the pilot". IGN's Terri Schwartz gave the episode an 8.4 out 10, saying that "Scream Queens might have gotten heavy-handed with the exposition in its fourth episode, but it still delivered some exciting twists and remains a joy to watch".

Patrick Sproull from Den of Geek said that "Scream Queens remains engrossing television and Haunted House greatly improves things by spicing up the core mystery. [The episode] was moreish and had me itching for the next instalment more than ever before. Caralynn Lippo from TV Fanatic gave the episode 3.75/5.0 stars and said that Haunted House "was a bit of an uneven hour but had its share of laugh-out-loud moments and memorable performances", and praised the performances of Keke Palmer and Glen Powell.
