= Pumpkin Patch (Scream Queens) =

- Scream Queens episode
- Episode no.: Season 1 Episode 5
- Directed by: Brad Falchuk
- Written by: Brad Falchuk
- Production code: 1AYD05
- Original air date: October 13, 2015
- Running time: 43 minutes

Guest appearances
- Niecy Nash as Denise Hemphill; Breezy Eslin as Jennifer "Candle Vlogger"; Jeanna Han as Sam "Predatory Lez"; Jim Clock as Detective Chisolm; Roy Huang as Cliff Woo; Mikki Val as Millie; Jency Griffin as Eva; Kenneth Kynt Bryan as Maria; Evan Paley as Caulfield; Aaron Rhodes as Roger; Austin Rhodes as Dodger

Episode chronology
← Previous "Haunted House"	Next → "Seven Minutes in Hell"

"Pumpkin Patch" is the fifth episode of the horror black comedy series Scream Queens. It first aired on October 13, 2015 on Fox. The episode was both directed and written by Brad Falchuk. In this episode, Dean Munsch (Jamie Lee Curtis) makes an announcement that affects the campus, and mostly, Chanel (Emma Roberts)'s plan to throw a pumpkin patch party in support of her Kappa presidential campaign. Grace (Skyler Samuels) and Pete (Diego Boneta) lead a search for Zayday (Keke Palmer), who was kidnapped by the Red Devil.

The episode was watched by 2.97 million viewers and received mixed to positive reviews from critics.

== Plot ==
Dean Munsch closes the university campus and institutes a curfew on Halloween night, automatically cancelling Chanel's pumpkin patch party. Chanel decides to break the rules and changes her party to November 1. Hester/Chanel #6 convinces Chanel #5 to destroy Chanel.

In class, Chanel is arrested for the murder of Ms. Bean. She is bailed out by Chanel #3 and Sam "Predatory Lesbian". As punishment for the setup, Chanel forces #5 to light all of the Jack-o'-lanterns in the pumpkin patch on Halloween night, knowing that the Red Devil will be out there. With no choice, she lights all the pumpkins with her boyfriends. The Red Devil appears with hedge shears behind #5 when she's lighting a pumpkin, and all of them run into the maze.

Zayday is revealed to be held hostage in a hole under the Red Devil's lair and is rescued by Gigi, who tases The Red Devil.

Back at Kappa house, Zayday tells the Kappas that The Red Devil let her out of the hole, gave her roses and presented her with her favorite food before she stabbed the Red Devil in the hand with a fork and escaped. Later that night, Gigi meets with the Red Devil, and reprimands him for the sloppiness of the Zayday incident, and giving him instructions for the next murder.

== Production ==
At the day the series premiered on Fox, series creator Ryan Murphy revealed that there would be a three-part Halloween episodes. This is the second Halloween episode. Special guest star Niecy Nash returns as Denise Hemphill, the odd security guard. Returning recurring characters including Kappa pledges Jennifer "Candle Vlogger" (Breezy Eslin) and Sam "Predatory Lez" (Jeanna Han), Detective Chisolm (Jim Clock), and Dickie Dollar Scholars fraternity members Caulfield (Evan Paley), and twins Roger (Aaron Rhodes) and Dodger (Austin Rhodes).

Back on September 2, 2015, Entertainment Weekly exclusively released an opening credits sequence for Scream Queens. Murphy also released the video on his YouTube channel. It features all the main cast members names, with Roberts, Skyler Samuels, Lea Michele, Glen Powell, Diego Boneta, Abigail Breslin, Keke Palmer, and Billie Lourd, along with the series' main villain, the Red Devil, appearing in the video. It features them screaming and attacked by the Red Devil in a homage to 80s horror flicks. An original song, "You Belong To Me" is performed by singer Heather Heywood, which was written by show composer Mac Quayle, Heywood and executive producer Alexis Martin Woodall. The title sequence has so far only appeared in this episode, though it is trimmed down to under a minute due to time constraints.

== Reception ==
=== Ratings ===
Pumpkin Patch was watched live by 2.39 million U.S and got a 1.0/3 rating/share in the adult 18-49 demographic

=== Critical reception ===
Pumpkin Patch received generally positive reviews from critics. IGN's Amber Dowling gave the episode 9.0 out of 10, saying "The second Halloween installment of Scream Queens wasn’t as spooky or gruesome as last week’s “Haunted House,” but it served to move the plot along via Chanel’s arrest and Gigi’s big reveal." Genevieve Valentine from The A.V. Club gave the episode a C+ and cited "The show cribs from the best; in this episode, it spends quite a bit of time on The Shining and Silence of the Lambs. But both of those became iconic because of their careful craftsmanship and deliberate pacing, neither of which carries over The episode’s big reveal—that Gigi is in league with the Red Devil—means nothing. I expect; Scream Queens isn’t interested in creating a horror story if it can manufacture some water-cooler camp instead."
