= Tavi Gevinson =

American writer (born 1996)

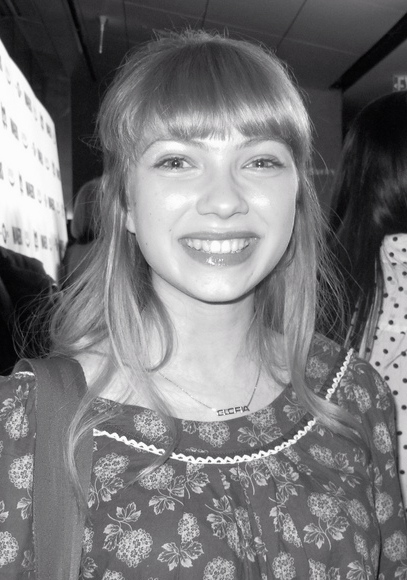
- Gevinson in 2013
- Born: April 21, 1996 (age 30); Chicago, Illinois, U.S.
- Education: Oak Park and River Forest High School
- Occupations: Writer; magazine editor; actress
- Website: RookieMag.com; TheStyleRookie.com

Tavi Gevinson (born April 21, 1996) is an American actress, writer, and magazine editor. At age twelve, she came to public attention for her fashion blog Style Rookie. By 15, she had shifted her focus to pop culture and feminist discussion. Gevinson began acting in 2013, and later starred in the HBO Max series Gossip Girl (2021–2023).

Gevinson was the founder and editor-in-chief of the online magazine Rookie, aimed primarily at teenage girls.

== Early life ==
Gevinson was born in Chicago, Illinois, and raised in the suburban town of Oak Park, Illinois. Her father, Steve Gevinson, is a high school English teacher. Her mother, Berit Engen, is a weaver and part-time Hebrew instructor who grew up in Oslo, Norway. Gevinson's father was born to an Orthodox Jewish family; her mother, who was raised Lutheran, converted to Judaism in 2001. Gevinson and her two older sisters were raised in the Jewish faith; she had a Bat Mitzvah ceremony. Gevinson attended Oak Park and River Forest High School and graduated in 2014.

== Career ==
=== 2008–2011: Style Rookie ===
Gevinson started a fashion blog, Style Rookie, in 2008. The blog, featuring photos of the 11-year-old in distinctive outfits and her commentary on the latest fashion trends, began drawing nearly 30,000 readers each day. Her father "wasn't terribly interested" in her new hobby until she asked for his permission to be interviewed by The New York Times for an article about young bloggers.

Because of the blog's success, Gevinson was invited to attend New York Fashion Week and Paris Fashion Week. She made overseas fashion-related trips to Tokyo and Antwerp, funded by Pop magazine, and was commissioned to write articles for Harper's Bazaar and Barneys. She styled a shoot for BlackBook magazine, acted as a muse and model for Rodarte's clothing line at Target stores, and partnered with Borders&Frontiers to design and sell her own T-shirt. In 2010, she spoke at a marketing conference in New York and at Idea City, a Canadian version of the TED conference.

There was a backlash to Gevinson's early success in the fashion industry. New York magazine questioned whether it was possible for Gevinson to write her blog without "some help from a mom or older sister". Sarah Mower of The Daily Telegraph, while conceding that Gevinson had a "truly independent, original voice", criticized her father for taking her out of school "to go to haute couture shows ... It's hard to imagine a kid being able to come back down to reality." A Grazia fashion editor complained on Twitter that a large bow Gevinson wore had blocked her view of a runway during New York Fashion Week. Anne Slowey of Elle felt her success was "gimmicky" and commented, "She's been thirteen for, like, the last four years." Gevinson later remarked: "A lot of people on the Internet have a problem with a young person doing well. I felt like there were people who were [at fashion week] because of their name, their money or their family, and I didn't have any of those things." She said in 2012 of her attendance at Fashion Week that

I was at the absolute height of my awkward phase when I went to Fashion Week. It's supposed to be this place with the most beautiful people in the world, and I was this incredibly tiny, gray-haired - what's the word? - gnome. That was the time in my life when I was most photographed, and I'm not embarrassed by that; I think it's hilarious that in the middle of these rooms full of tall, skinny people in black was this tiny weird person. ... with a giant bow. I think it's awesome that it made a lot of people angry. I felt pleased with that because I spent all my time trying to prove that fashion wasn't just frivolous and could have personal or public meaning, and here you had a bunch of people somehow making a giant bow into a metaphor for the death of fashion journalism.

=== 2011–present: Rookie, acting roles, etc. ===
In early 2011, Gevinson decided to stop writing primarily about fashion: "Lately I've been looking to other places for a creative outlet and for inspiration ... Now I'm more intrigued by mixing fashion with the other stuff I've been enjoying." Her personal style also became less outlandish: "Before, dressing up was my outlet, and now I'm pursuing other creative things that take up a lot of time and energy, so in the morning I usually want to put on something simple and comfortable."

In the fall of 2011, at the age of 15, Gevinson founded Rookie magazine. The site was originally conceived of as a joint venture with Jane Pratt, but Gevinson ultimately decided to maintain sole ownership. Ira Glass acted as a mentor figure to Gevinson. The website focused on issues impacting teenage girls and was written mainly by teenage girls. It also featured guest contributors. A one-off print edition of the magazine, Rookie Yearbook One, was published by Drawn & Quarterly in 2012. In 2012, Gevinson spoke at TEDxTeen, with a focus on representation of women in popular culture, and at The Economist's World in 2012 Festival. She is also a contributing editor at Garage magazine. In November 2018, Gevinson announced that she was shutting down Rookie due to its no longer being financially sustainable.

Gevinson first acted in a short film, First Bass, in 2008, but became more visible in 2012. That year, she voiced a character in the animated short film Cadavar, which was directed by First Bass's Jonah Ansell and co-starred Kathy Bates and Christopher Lloyd. In the film, she sang renditions of both Neil Young and Pet Shop Boys songs. Also in 2012, Gevinson filmed a role in Enough Said by director Nicole Holofcener. Gevinson is interviewed on screen in the 2013 documentary film The Punk Singer, talking about riot grrrl punk icon Kathleen Hanna. In 2014 and 2015, she starred in This Is Our Youth in Chicago and at the Cort Theatre on Broadway. In 2015, she made a guest appearance as Feather McCarthy on "Beware of Young Girls", the seventh episode of the American comedy horror television series Scream Queens. She played Mary Warren in Ivo van Hove's 2016 production of The Crucible at the Walter Kerr Theatre. Later that year, she played Anya in The Cherry Orchard at the American Airlines Theatre.

On the MSNBC chat show So Popular!, host Janet Mock dubbed Gevinson the "Queen of the Millennials". She then made a guest appearance on The Nightly Show with Larry Wilmore on a panel critiquing Sean Penn's Rolling Stone interview with El Chapo.

In 2016, Gevinson recorded a duet with Hunx and His Punx frontman Seth Bogart, singing on "Barely 21" from Bogart's self-titled debut solo album.

== Acting credits ==
=== Film ===
Year	Title	Role
2013	Enough Said	Chloe
2016	Goldbricks in Bloom	Calvin's ex
2017	Person to Person	Wendy
2023	Shortcomings	Autumn
2024	Boys Go to Jupiter	Glarba (voice)
2026	Act One	TBA

=== Television ===
Year	Title	Role	Notes
2012	Project Runway All Stars	self-judge	Episode: "Made in the USA Today"
2012-13	Late Night with Jimmy Fallon	self-guest	4 episodes
2013	The Colbert Report	self-guest	Episode: "Tavi Gevinson"
2014	Katie	self-guest	Episode: "Medical Mysteries"
2014	Parenthood	Lauren	Episode: "The Pontiac"
2014	The Simpsons	Jenny (voice)	Episode: "What to Expect When Bart's Expecting"
2015	Scream Queens	Feather McCarthy	Episode: "Beware of Young Girls"
2016	The Nightly Show with Larry Wilmore	self-panelist	Episode: "Sean Penn's El Chapo Interview"
2017	Neo Yokio	Helena St. Tessero (voice)	Main role; 6 episodes
2020	The Twilight Zone	Maggie	Episode: "The Human Face"
2021–2023	Gossip Girl	Kate Keller	Main role; 24 episodes
2023	American Horror Story: Delicate	Cora	4 episodes

=== Theater ===
Year	Title	Role	Venue	Notes
2009	Les Misérables	Gavroche	Circle Theatre	
2014–2015	This Is Our Youth	Jessica	Steppenwolf Theatre	Chicago revival
2014–2015	This Is Our Youth	Jessica	Cort Theatre	Broadway transfer
2016	The Crucible	Mary Warren	Walter Kerr Theatre	Broadway
2016	The Cherry Orchard	Anya	American Airlines Theatre	Broadway
2017–2019	Moscow Moscow Moscow Moscow Moscow Moscow	Irina	Williamstown Theatre Festival: 2017	
2017–2019	Moscow Moscow Moscow Moscow Moscow Moscow	Irina	MCC Theater: 2019	Off-Broadway transfer
2018	The Member of the Wedding	Frankie Addams	Williamstown Theatre Festival	
2018	Days of Rage	Peggy	Second Stage Theater	Off-Broadway
2020	Assassins	Lynette "Squeaky" Fromme	Classic Stage Company	Off-Broadway
2024	Pre-existing Condition	"A"	OHenry productions	Off-off-Broadway

== Politics ==
During the 2012 US presidential campaign, Gevinson supported Barack Obama, and appeared in a public service announcement for women's rights, mouthing the words to Lesley Gore's "You Don't Own Me". She organized a get-well-soon-card drive for Malala Yousafzai, the fourteen-year-old Pakistani girl whose campaigning for education rights led to her shooting in October 2012.
