= Seven Minutes in Hell =

- Scream Queens episode
- Episode no.: Season 1 Episode 6
- Directed by: Michael Uppendahl
- Written by: Ryan Murphy
- Production code: 1AYD06
- Original air date: October 20, 2015
- Running time: 42 minutes

Guest appearances
- Breezy Eslin as Jennifer "Candle Vlogger"; Jeanna Han as Sam "Predatory Lez"; Jim Clock as Detective Chisolm; Evan Paley as Caulfield; Aaron Rhodes as Roger

Episode chronology
← Previous "Pumpkin Patch"	Next → "Beware of Young Girls"

"Seven Minutes in Hell" is the sixth episode of the horror black comedy series Scream Queens. It first aired on October 20, 2015, on Fox. The episode directed by Michael Uppendahl and written by Ryan Murphy. In this episode, Chanel (Emma Roberts) makes a surprising decision: to protect herself from the Red Devil by leaving Zayday in position of power and win the election as president of Kappa Kappa Tau. When the Kappa girls hold a slumber party, it costs the life of some people and a shocking discovery is made. The episode title refers to the game Seven Minutes in Heaven, one of the ones played by the Kappa Kappa Tau sisters and Dickie Dollar Scholars brothers in this episode as part of the slumber party.

The episode was watched by 2.59 million viewers and received mostly positive reviews from critics. After this episode, there was a week hiatus due to the 2015 World Series.

== Plot ==
The Chanels and the pledges vote for their new president between Chanel (Emma Roberts) and Zayday (Keke Palmer). It comes to a tie. Zayday suggests they both be co-presidents, which makes Chanel angry. When Chanel #3 (Billie Lourd) and Chanel #5 (Abigail Breslin) try to comfort her in her closet, Chanel tells them how it was part of her plan and opts to cede her presidency to Zayday as she thought by not being the leader she won't be the Red Devil's target. In her room, Zayday and Grace (Skyler Samuels) suggest they throw a slumber party and play 'Truth or Dare' to find out who the killer is. At the part, the sisters play "Spin the Bottle" and Hester (Lea Michele) and Jennifer "Candle Vlogger" kiss. Chanel #3 spins twice so she can kiss Sam "Predatory Lez." Afterwards, Chanel #3 tells Sam why she always wears earmuffs. A boy was obsessed with her ears and sent her an email threatening to cut them off if he ever saw them again so she hides them with earmuffs. Jennifer and Sam tell the sisters that all the doors and windows are locked. Chanel thinks someone might have hacked into the security system. The lights suddenly go out and the sisters scream.

Chanel calls Chad, who, along with his Dickie Dollar Scholars brothers are on their way to Kappa House to do a panty raid. She calls him with her satellite phone as the phone lines are down and he confesses about sleeping with Dean Munsch (Jamie Lee Curtis) and Denise (Niecy Nash). When the frat brothers arrive with a ladder, Chad breaks the window and climbs in. When he sees the Red Devil, he shouts at his brothers to climb up. Earl (Lucien Laviscount) and Roger (Aaron Rhodes) manage to, but Caulfield is murdered. The Kappa sisters and Dickie Dollar brothers decide to play "Truth or Dare" to determine who the killer is. The game ends up with Sam revealing that Chanel #3's father is Charles Manson. Angered but confused by her feelings for Sam, Chanel #3 dares her to go down into the basement and take a nap in the bloody Kappa bathtub. Sam is visited by the Red Devil there. She asks them to take off their mask before she is killed, which they do off-screen. She says "I knew it was you" before the Red Devil murders her.

The group decides to play "Seven Minutes in Heaven" and Chanel picks Chad. She asks Chad to promise not to sleep with anyone else and be in a monogamous relationship with her and Chad promises. Chanel #5 and Roger go next. The rest of the group finds Hester, who discovered Sam's body. Some sisters accuse Hester of being the killer as she was the first to find her. In Chanel's closet, Chanel #5 and Roger are together when Roger is also killed by the Red Devil, which Chanel #5 witnesses. The group see Roger's body and claim Chanel #5 as the killer. Chad lets everyone know there are two killers. Chanel claims Pete (Diego Boneta) as the killer as he hasn't been seen yet. Chad finds a trap door under one of the Chanel's shelves. The group suggests that's how the killer got in. Chanel and Zayday go explore it but the Red Devil appears and chases them, with both of them narrowly escaping after Chanel saves Zayday.

The next day, Grace talks to Detective Chisolm about how the murders all appear related to Kappa, except Coney's. While the detective talks about having uniformed officers protecting the house, Wes tells Grace they're leaving, but she refuses, claiming that her sisters need her. In the bathroom, Chanel #3 and Chanel #5 make a pact to outlive Chanel. Chanel gives the sisters pink nun chucks and declares that they won't lose any more sisters. The girls start dancing while the Red Devil watches through the window.

== Production ==
At the day the series premiered on Fox, series creator Ryan Murphy revealed that there would be a three-part Halloween episodes. This is the third and last special Halloween episode. Returning recurring characters include Kappa pledges Jennifer "Candle Vlogger" (Breezy Eslin) and Sam "Predatory Lez" (Jeanna Han), Detective Chisolm (Jim Clock), and Dickie Dollar Scholars fraternity members Caulfield (Evan Paley), and twins Roger (Aaron Rhodes) and Dodger (Austin Rhodes).

== Reception ==
=== Ratings ===
Seven Minutes in Hell was watched live by 2.59 million U.S. and got a 1.0/3 rating/share in the adult 18-49 demographic, up from the previous episode.

=== Critical reception ===
Seven Minutes in Hell received generally positive reviews from critics. LaToya Ferguson of The A.V. Club give the episode a B+, citing "After weeks of pointing out Scream Queens’ aggressively mean-spirited nature and confused tone, this week's episode, “Seven Minutes In Hell,” finally feels like a strong piece of course correction for the show." IGN's Terri Schwartz give the episode 7.8 out of 10, stating it as "one of the series' weaker installments, though it did have several gems like Zayday's (Keke Palmer) pronouncement that, as co-KKT president, "the biggest change I'd like to implement is for everyone to stop being killed by a serial killer," and the Dickie Dollar Scholars' intervention with Chad for having sex with too many old people." Patrick Sproull from Den of Geek says "Scream Queens' halfway point ended on a thrilling note. We've got a long way to go before the finale but the journey from here on out certainly looks like an exciting one."
