= Chainsaw (Scream Queens) =

- Scream Queens episode
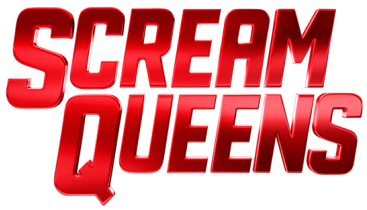
- Episode no.: Season 1 Episode 3
- Directed by: Ian Brennan
- Written by: Ian Brennan
- Production code: 1AYD03
- Original air date: September 29, 2015
- Running time: 43 minutes

Guest appearances
- Niecy Nash as Denise Hemphill; Roger Bart as Dr. Herfmann; Charisma Carpenter as Mrs. Herfmann; Breezy Eslin as Jennifer "Candle Vlogger"; Jeanna Han as Sam "Predatory Lez"; Evan Paley as Caulfield; Aaron Rhodes as Roger; Austin Rhodes as Dodger

Episode chronology
← Previous "Hell Week"	Next → "Haunted House"

"Chainsaw" is the third episode of the horror black comedy series Scream Queens. It premiered on September 29, 2015, on Fox. The episode was both directed and written by Ian Brennan. In this episode, the Red Devil continues the terror on campus using a chainsaw. Chanel (Emma Roberts) finds a new project in Hester (Lea Michele), and Dean Munsch (Jamie Lee Curtis) appoints a new Wallace University mascot while trying to separate Gigi (Nasim Pedrad) and Wes (Oliver Hudson)'s budding relationship as Chad (Glen Powell) and Earl Grey (Lucien Laviscount) lead their fraternity on a witch hunt for the Red Devil.

The episode was watched by 3.46 million viewers and received mixed to positive reviews from critics, most of them citing it as an improvement from the two previous episodes.

== Plot ==
Due to Chanel #2's mysterious absence, Zayday and Grace visit her parents in Bel Air, California to find out what happened. It is revealed that her real name is Sonya, she had a drinking problem, and she used to date Chad Radwell. They tell Zayday, Grace, and Denise to find her and tell her not to go home ever again.

At a candle-light vigil held for Boone, Dean Cathy Munsch introduces a new university mascot, Coney. Coney is later decapitated by the Red Devil, in his dorm room.

Chanel, realizing she can make outcast pledge Hester popular, decides to give her a makeover and making Hester her new minion, Chanel #6.

Chad and Earl Grey encourage The Dickie Dollar Scholars fraternity to organize a witch hunt, to avenge Boone's "death". The frat brothers start their witch hunt and the Red Devil appears with a chainsaw on one side and another person in a Red Devil costume appears on the other. The frat brothers fight the Devils, which results in Chad being knocked out and Caulfield losing both arms.

While Gigi is sleeping on the couch downstairs, the Red Devil appears and chases her with the chainsaw. Wes hears her screaming and runs to help her. Gigi then flips one of the couches and knocks the Red Devil over. Wes and Gigi then look over the flipped couch to only see the chainsaw running with no Red Devil. Cathy appears and Wes accuses her of being the killer.

== Production ==
Niecy Nash returns as special guest star portraying Denise Hemphill, the odd security guard. Returning recurring characters in this episode include Kappa pledges Jennifer "Candle Vlogger" (Breezy Eslin), Sam "Predatory Lez" (Jeanna Han), and Dickie Dollar Scholars fraternity members Caulfield (Evan Paley), and twins Roger and Dodger (Aaron and Austin Rhodes). Before the series started, back on June 24, 2015, it was announced that Charisma Carpenter and Roger Bart had been cast in a guest role as Chanel #2 (Ariana Grande)'s parents. They made their guest appearance in this episode, as Dr. and Mrs. Herfmann, the wealthy parents of Chanel #2, whose name was revealed to be Sonya in this episode.

== Reception ==
=== Ratings ===
Chainsaw was watched live by 3.46 million U.S. viewers and got a 1.4 rating/5 share in the adult 18-49 demographic.

=== Critical reception ===
"Chainsaw" received mixed to positive review from critics, most of them citing that it was an improvement over the first two episodes. LaToya Ferguson from The A.V. Club gave the episode a "B−" and stated that there were "moments in the episode that really worked and created a sense of anticipation that was truly missing in those first two episodes." TV.com's Lily Sparks said that she "enjoyed the third episode maybe three times more than the premiere." Dr. Zaius from Geeks of the Doom cited "I wish they would tone down the silliness, and lean towards the darker side a bit. [...] I enjoyed this week’s show – the show takes nothing seriously, and at times it works very well."

In a much more positive review, Terri Schwartz from IGN said "the FOX series runs the risk of over-complicating itself. Still, the humor remains biting and hilarious and the cast delivers committed, clever performances, and Scream Queens remains a joy to watch." Caralynn Lippo, from TV Fanatic, gave the episode 4 out of 5 stars, citing that Chainsaw "somehow managed to up the campy quotient that was already prevalent in the series premiere."
