= Black Friday (Scream Queens) =

- Scream Queens episode
- Episode no.: Season 1 Episode 11
- Directed by: Barbara Brown
- Written by: Ian Brennan
- Production code: 1AYD11
- Original air date: December 1, 2015
- Running time: 43 minutes

Guest appearances
- Niecy Nash as Denise Hemphill; Jim Clock as Detective Chisolm; Evan Paley as Caulfield Mount Herman; Aaron Rhodes as Roger; Austin Rhodes as Dodger

Episode chronology
| ← Previous "Thanksgiving" | Next → "Dorkus" |

"Black Friday" is the eleventh episode of the horror black comedy series Scream Queens. It premiered on December 1, 2015 on Fox. The episode was directed by Bradley Buecker and written by Ryan Murphy, Brad Falchuk, and Ian Brennan. In this episode, The Red Devils attempt to crash The Chanels' shopping spree in celebration of their favorite holiday, Black Friday. As the Kappa Kappa Tau girls conclude that Dean Munsch (Jamie Lee Curtis) is the Devil, they make several attempts to kill her. Meanwhile, someone else confesses to being the murderer.

The episode was watched by 2.40 million viewers and received positive reviews from critics.

== Plot ==
After a Black Friday encounter with The Red Devil, Grace and Chanel have the idea to poison Dean Munsch using apple cider spiked with blowfish venom. The attempt fails. Pete talks Grace into quitting the mission. Chanel then kicks Grace out of the sorority.

Wes and Pete research information about Gigi and find out her birth name was Jess Meyer, and that she is the sister of Amy Meyer, the girl from the 1995 flashback who holds Sophia's baby. It is also revealed that Amy committed suicide due to the stress of the event and Gigi then took care of the baby after Amy's suicide.

Meanwhile, Pete admits that Boone was his source for a story about the negative effects of the College Greek system. It is revealed that Pete unsuccessfully attempted to pledge The Dickie Dollar Scholars, but got rejected by Chad and deemed the worst pledge ever, explaining Pete's hatred to the College Greek system. In response to Boone's friendship, Chad decides to offer Pete membership. Pete refuses.

The girls decide to freeze Dean Munsch to death using a cryotherapy chamber. When Chanel opens the door, Dean Munsch is shown covered in ice, still alive. Chanel comes up with one last idea to drown her. The Dean gets suspicious and puts Chanel on risk.

== Reception ==
=== Ratings ===
"Black Friday" was watched live by 2.41 million U.S. viewers and got a 0.9/3 rating/share in the 18-49 adult demographic

=== Critical reception ===
"Black Friday" received positive reviews from critics. LaToya Ferguson from The A.V. Club gave the episode a B, citing "But “Black Friday” is also probably the last bit of “fun” these characters will have before the finale, so it’s at least a good thing that this is a very funny episode and, for the first time all season, no one is the weak link." Sarene Leeds from The Wall Street Journal stated that "I didn’t think it was possible for “Scream Queens” to stretch itself any thinner in its debut season, but congratulations, Ryan Murphy, you’ve done it again." Patrick Sproull of the Den of Geek said "Black Friday tried to deliver some solid development and teasing in the B-plot alongside the fluffy main action." IGN's Amber Dowling gave the episode 8.0 out of 10, stating "The series continued to cleverly play with common horror tropes. By the closing moments it was Jamie Lee Curtis who stood out most, however, killing it in a way that only she can."
