= Ghost Stories (Scream Queens) =

- Scream Queens episode
- Episode no.: Season 1 Episode 9
- Directed by: Michael Uppendahl
- Written by: Ryan Murphy
- Production code: 1AYD09
- Original air date: November 17, 2015
- Running time: 43 minutes

Guest appearances
- Nick Jonas as Boone Clemens; Niecy Nash as Denise Hemphill; Jim Clock as Detective Chisolm

Episode chronology
← Previous "Mommie Dearest"	Next → "Thanksgiving"

"Ghost Stories" is the ninth episode of the horror black comedy series Scream Queens. It first aired on November 17, 2015 on Fox. The episode was directed by Michael Uppendahl and written by Ryan Murphy. The episode focuses on Denise (Niecy Nash)'s attempt to calm The Chanels down by telling them ghost stories and urban legends, which start to become true. The episode also features the return of special guest star Nick Jonas as Boone Clemens, whose activities while being absent are revealed in this episode.

The episode was viewed by 2.37 million viewers during its premiere and received generally positive reviews from critics.

== Plot ==
Boone Clemens runs into Chanel #3, who mistakes him for a ghost. Chanel #3 goes back to Kappa House and informs the other Chanels of her encounter with Boone. To take their minds off the incident, Denise tells the girls a story about a killer who drags women in toilets and a killer who kills people while they use the bathroom. Boone pays a visit to Chad, who also thinks he's a ghost. He borrows a 'date shirt' from Chad, saying that the only way for him to be 'among the living' would be to have sex with Zayday.

Denise goes to use the bathroom and is attacked by the Red Devil, as described in her story. Denise asks the rest of the girls for a ghost story to calm her down. Hester tells her a story about a girl being pursued by a killer while driving alone in her car.

Chanel #5 decides to drive home, where she is pursued by the Red Devil. In a parallel to the events in Hester's story, a trucker driving behind her honks his horn to scare off the Red Devil. The Red Devil fatally stabs the trucker with a machete.

Zayday and Earl Grey are passionately kissing on Zayday's bed until Earl goes to get a condom. Boone climbs through her bedroom window, trying to seduce Zayday, who realizes Boone is one of the Red Devils. Before he can make it back to Zayday's room, Earl is fatally stabbed by Boone, who is revealed as the Red Devil.

Boone tells Gigi that he has had had enough following her instructions. He is intent on murdering her with the help of the other Red Devil, but the other Red Devil stabs him in the chest.

Hester says that she will still have Chad get her pregnant. Angered, Chanel pushes Hester down the stairs, breaking her neck.

== Production ==
Nick Jonas and Niecy Nash return as special guest stars, playing Boone Clemens, the former member of the Dickie Dollar Scholars who faked his death and the ally of the Red Devil, and Denise Hemphill, the kick-butt but odd security guard.

== Reception ==
=== Ratings ===
Ghost Stories was watched live by 2.37 million U.S. viewers and got a 0.9 rating/3 share in the adult 18-49 demographic.

=== Critical reception ===
Ghost Stories receive generally positive review from critics. Terri Schwartz from IGN gave the episode 8.0 out of 10, stated "Though Scream Queens still feels like it can't move the plot forward quickly without giving away the killer, "Ghost Stories" provided some fun new details without being completely focused on the murder mystery." LaToya Ferguson from The A.V. club gave the episode B, noting "it’s easy to assume that Ryan Murphy (who penned this episode) doesn’t know what lampshading is; this episode’s so meta that if he did know, Kappa Kappa Tau would likely have gotten a home décor delivery by the beginning of Act Three."
