= Scream Queens (2015 TV series) =

2015 TV series

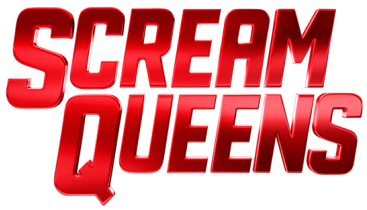
- Genre: Comedy horror; Dark comedy; Satire; Slasher
- Created by: Ryan Murphy; Brad Falchuk; Ian Brennan
- Starring: Emma Roberts; Skyler Samuels; Lea Michele; Glen Powell; Diego Boneta; Abigail Breslin; Keke Palmer; Oliver Hudson; Nasim Pedrad; Lucien Laviscount; Billie Lourd; Jamie Lee Curtis; Kirstie Alley; Taylor Lautner; James Earl III; John Stamos
- Theme music composer: Mac Quayle; Heather Heywood; Alexis Martin Woodall
- Opening theme: "You Belong to Me" by Heather Heywood
- Composer: Mac Quayle
- Country of origin: United States
- Original language: English
- No. of seasons: 2
- No. of episodes: 23

Production
- Executive producers: Ian Brennan; Brad Falchuk; Ryan Murphy; Alexis Martin Woodall; Dante Di Loreto
- Producers: Barry M. Berg; Robert M. Williams Jr.
- Production locations: New Orleans, Louisiana (season 1); Los Angeles, California (season 2)
- Cinematography: Michael Goi; Joaquin Sedillo
- Editors: John Petaja; Andrew Groves; Ishai Setton; Adam Penn
- Running time: 42–44 minutes
- Production companies: Prospect Films; Brad Falchuk Teley-vision; Ryan Murphy Productions; 20th Century Fox Television

Original release
- Network: Fox
- Release: September 22, 2015 – December 20, 2016

Scream Queens is an American satirical dark comedy slasher television series that aired on Fox from September 22, 2015, to December 20, 2016. The series was created by Ryan Murphy, Brad Falchuk, and Ian Brennan and produced by Murphy, Falchuk, Brennan, and Alexis Martin Woodall, and by 20th Century Fox Television, Ryan Murphy Productions, Brad Falchuk Teley-vision, and Prospect Films.

The first season stars an ensemble cast consisting of Emma Roberts, Ariana Grande, Skyler Samuels, Lea Michele, Glen Powell, Diego Boneta, Abigail Breslin, Keke Palmer, Oliver Hudson, Nasim Pedrad, Lucien Laviscount, Billie Lourd, and Jamie Lee Curtis, with Niecy Nash, and Nick Jonas in supporting roles. It takes place at the fictional Wallace University, and was filmed at Tulane University in New Orleans, Louisiana. It follows sorority Kappa Kappa Tau (KKT) which is targeted by a serial killer using the university's Red Devil mascot as a disguise.

On January 15, 2016, Fox renewed the series for a second season, which premiered on September 20, 2016. Roberts, Michele, Powell, Breslin, Palmer, Hudson, Lourd, Nash, and Curtis reprised their roles from the first season, while John Stamos, Taylor Lautner, James Earl III, and Kirstie Alley were added to the cast. Instead of a university, the second season was set in a hospital, and was filmed and produced in Los Angeles, California.

The show was canceled on May 15, 2017, after two seasons. In May 2020, Murphy stated that he was working on a third season of the series.

== Plot ==
The first season focuses on the Kappa Kappa Tau sorority at Wallace University, led by Chanel Oberlin (Emma Roberts) and her fellow Chanels #2 (Ariana Grande), #3 (Billie Lourd), and #5 (Abigail Breslin), that are threatened by Dean Cathy Munsch (Jamie Lee Curtis). Events reignite a 20-year-old murder mystery, with the reemergence of the serial killer dressed as the Red Devil mascot, who begins targeting the sorority members.

The second season shows Cathy Munsch having opened a hospital after leaving the university business. She has taken an acquitted Chanel, Libby (Chanel #5), and Sadie (Chanel #3) under her wing after the real Red Devil killer came clean. While handling different medical cases, Cathy and the Chanels end up encountering a new serial killer called the Green Meanie.

== Cast and characters ==
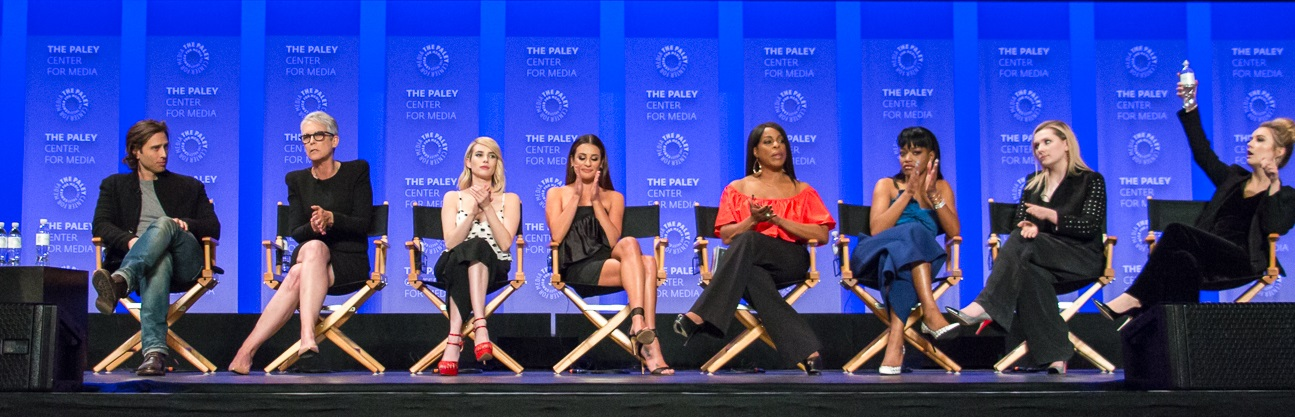
Scream Queens cast at 2016 Paleyfest. L–R : Brad Falchuk, Jamie Lee Curtis, Emma Roberts, Lea Michele, Niecy Nash, Keke Palmer, Abigail Breslin, Billie Lourd

=== Main ===
- Emma Roberts as Chanel Oberlin, the wealthy and snobbish President of the Kappa Kappa Tau sorority.
- Skyler Samuels as Grace Gardner (season 1), incoming Wallace University student who pledges to join KKT as her late mother was formerly a member.
- Lea Michele as Hester Ulrich/Chanel #6, a socially awkward Kappa pledge.
- Glen Powell as Chad Radwell (season 1; recurring season 2), the wealthy and arrogant on-and-off boyfriend of Chanel and President of the Dickie Dollar Scholars fraternity.
- Diego Boneta as Pete Martinez (season 1), love interest of Grace who detests Kappa Kappa Tau.
- Abigail Breslin as Libby Putney/Chanel #5, member of Kappa Kappa Tau who is often berated by Chanel.
- Keke Palmer as Zayday Williams, friend of Grace who pledges Kappa alongside her.
- Oliver Hudson as Weston "Wes" Gardner (season 1; guest season 2), the overprotective father of Grace.
- Nasim Pedrad as Gigi Caldwell/Jess Meyer (season 1), lawyer and President of the national chapter of Kappa Kappa Tau.
- Lucien Laviscount as Earl Grey (season 1), member of the Dickie Dollar Scholars.
- Billie Lourd as Sadie Swenson/Chanel #3, member of Kappa Kappa Tau
- Jamie Lee Curtis as Dean Cathy Munsch, Dean of Students at Wallace University.
- Kirstie Alley as Nurse Ingrid Hoffel (née Bean; season 2)
- Taylor Lautner as Dr. Cassidy Cascade (season 2)
- James Earl III as Chamberlain Jackson (season 2)
- John Stamos as Dr. Brock Holt (season 2)

=== Selected recurring ===
==== Season one ====
- Niecy Nash as Denise Hemphill, safety officer at Wallace University.
- Ariana Grande as Sonya Herfmann/Chanel #2, member of Kappa Kappa Tau.
- Nick Jonas as Boone Clemens, the homosexual friend of Chad and member of the Dickie Dollar Scholars.
- Breezy Eslin as Jennifer, Kappa pledge and candle vlogger.
- Jeanna Han as Sam, Kappa pledge and lesbian love interest of Chanel #3.
- Anna Grace Barlow, Grace Phipps, and Anna Margaret appear as Bethany Stevens (later known as Mary Mulligan), Mandy Greenwell, and Coco Cohen, respectively, former members of Kappa Kappa Tau.
- Jan Hoag as Ms. Agatha Bean, Kappa Kappa Tau maid.
- McKaley Miller as Sophia Doyle, former Kappa Kappa Tau member who died after giving birth at a Kappa party.
- Brianne Howey as Melanie Dorkus, former president of Kappa Kappa Tau who was burned with hydrochloric acid.

==== Season two ====
- Riley Schmidt as Red Devil/Green Meanie
- Trilby Glover as Jane Hollis
- Jerry O'Connell as Dr. Mike
- Laura Bell Bundy as Nurse Thomas
- Andy Erikson as Marguerite Honeywell/Chanel #7
- Kevin Bigley as Randal

== Episodes ==
Season	Episodes	Originally released	
Season	Episodes	First released	Last released
1	13	September 22, 2015	December 8, 2015
2	10	September 20, 2016	December 20, 2016

=== Season 1 (2015) ===
No. overall	No. in season	Title	Directed by	Written by	Original release date	Prod. code	US viewers (millions)
1	1	"Pilot"	Ryan Murphy	Ryan Murphy & Brad Falchuk & Ian Brennan	September 22, 2015	1AYD01	4.04
2	2	"Hell Week"	Brad Falchuk	Ryan Murphy & Brad Falchuk & Ian Brennan	September 22, 2015	1AYD02	4.04
3	3	"Chainsaw"	Ian Brennan	Ian Brennan	September 29, 2015	1AYD03	3.46
4	4	"Haunted House"	Bradley Buecker	Brad Falchuk	October 6, 2015	1AYD04	2.97
5	5	"Pumpkin Patch"	Brad Falchuk	Brad Falchuk	October 13, 2015	1AYD05	2.39
6	6	"Seven Minutes in Hell"	Michael Uppendahl	Ryan Murphy	October 20, 2015	1AYD06	2.59
7	7	"Beware of Young Girls"	Barbara Brown	Ryan Murphy	November 3, 2015	1AYD07	2.44
8	8	"Mommie Dearest"	Michael Uppendahl	Ian Brennan	November 10, 2015	1AYD08	2.51
9	9	"Ghost Stories"	Michael Uppendahl	Ryan Murphy	November 17, 2015	1AYD09	2.37
10	10	"Thanksgiving"	Michael Lehmann	Brad Falchuk	November 24, 2015	1AYD10	1.98
11	11	"Black Friday"	Barbara Brown	Ian Brennan	December 1, 2015	1AYD11	2.40
12	12	"Dorkus"	Bradley Buecker	Ryan Murphy & Brad Falchuk & Ian Brennan	December 8, 2015	1AYD12	2.53
13	13	"The Final Girl(s)"	Brad Falchuk	Ryan Murphy & Brad Falchuk & Ian Brennan	December 8, 2015	1AYD13	2.53

=== Season 2 (2016) ===
No. overall	No. in season	Title	Directed by	Written by	Original release date	Prod. code	US viewers (millions)
14	1	"Scream Again"	Brad Falchuk	Ryan Murphy & Brad Falchuk & Ian Brennan	September 20, 2016	2AYD01	2.17
15	2	"Warts and All"	Bradley Buecker	Brad Falchuk	September 27, 2016	2AYD02	1.70
16	3	"Handidates"	Barbara Brown	Ian Brennan	October 11, 2016	2AYD03	1.59
17	4	"Halloween Blues"	Loni Peristere	Brad Falchuk	October 18, 2016	2AYD04	1.43
18	5	"Chanel Pour Homme-icide"	Barbara Brown	Ian Brennan	November 15, 2016	2AYD05	1.42
19	6	"Blood Drive"	Mary Wigmore	Brad Falchuk	November 22, 2016	2AYD06	1.15
20	7	"The Hand"	Barbara Brown	Ian Brennan	November 29, 2016	2AYD07	1.33
21	8	"Rapunzel, Rapunzel"	Jamie Lee Curtis	Brad Falchuk	December 6, 2016	2AYD08	1.18
22	9	"Lovin the D"	Maggie Kiley	Ian Brennan	December 13, 2016	2AYD09	1.13
23	10	"Drain the Swamp"	Ian Brennan	Brad Falchuk & Ian Brennan	December 20, 2016	2AYD10	1.37

== Production ==
=== Development ===
Brad and Ian and I, all three of us, were always obsessed with the '80s/early '90s slasher genre that was always about young people and always about coming of age. So we loved that and we decided to sort of be inspired by that idea. That was sort of the impetus of it.

— Co-creator Ryan Murphy on the inception of the series.

On October 20, 2014, Fox Broadcasting Company announced that it had ordered a 15-episode season of Scream Queens (including a second season in the original contract), created by Ryan Murphy, Brad Falchuk and Ian Brennan who also co-created Glee, which was later reduced to 13 episodes. The series will be executive produced by Murphy, Falchuk, Brennan, and Dante Di Loreto. The series premiered in September 2015. Murphy has stated that every episode a cast member will be killed off, saying, "It's very much like Ten Little Indians. There's a real tune-in factor because it's like, Who's going to be picked off this week? And also who is the killer? Every episode, you get clues as to who the killer is going to be and then all of these clues accumulate." The series will not be completely anthological in nature with Murphy stating, "Whoever survives—and there will be people who will survive—they will go on next season to a new location and a new terror. Unlike [Murphy and Falchuk's other like series] American Horror Story, which completely reboots, this has some of the continuity in that some of the characters and some of the relationships continue into a new world." The first season's killer will not be revealed until the final episode. Murphy has announced that the second season will feature three Halloween episodes.

Falchuk shared insight on the decision making of who the killer(s) would be, saying, "We decided right at the beginning. We talked through what is it — Who is the killer? What is it? — so we would always know going forward. In that process, we've had moments where we're like, 'What if instead of this person, it's this person?' Then we talk it through, and we've always come back to our original plan." Further elaborating on the nature of a whodunit narrative Falchuk stated, "We're very careful to have somebody go through the script all the time and try to understand who was attacked, when they were attacked, why they were attacked, and if it's possible that we are eliminating anyone as a suspect by doing this. The answer always has to be no, because we know how fans are. They make big charts about who the killer is, and then someone figures it out. I think there's great fun in the whodunnit, but it's also, somebody's going to figure it out. By the end of episode one, somebody's going to figure it out, because that's what people do. I don't think it'll take anything away from anything."

Falchuk talked at length about the decision-making processes as to who will die in each episode, "It's harder casting and directing actors you know you're going to have to kill off. Once you get on the set and you're working with them, they're sometimes so great that it's challenging." The creator continued, "...when we got to know the actress who played Deaf Taylor Swift, she was so funny that we got together and said, 'Is there a way we can not kill her and maybe kill someone else?' And it's like no, we love everybody, and it also sort of fit with the story, so we had to go forward with it." Speaking to the tricky horror/comedy nature of the show, Falchuk stated, "The way you find the balance is understanding that, when you're missing some ingredients, certain ingredients are super strong, and the flavor is so strong that if you use too much, it ruins the whole soup. Horror is something that is a really strong flavor, so just little drops of it is the best recipe." The series is a commentary on "youth culture and college culture", with characters like Dean Munsch and Wes Gardner providing the adult commentary. "He's connected in a way that it's harder for him to be objective about, because his daughter, Grace, is there. Then you have the dean, and she lives having seen this culture develop over the course of her years as an educator, and she's reacting to it."

In September 2015, it was revealed that scream queen Heather Langenkamp is behind the special effects for the series.

=== Casting ===
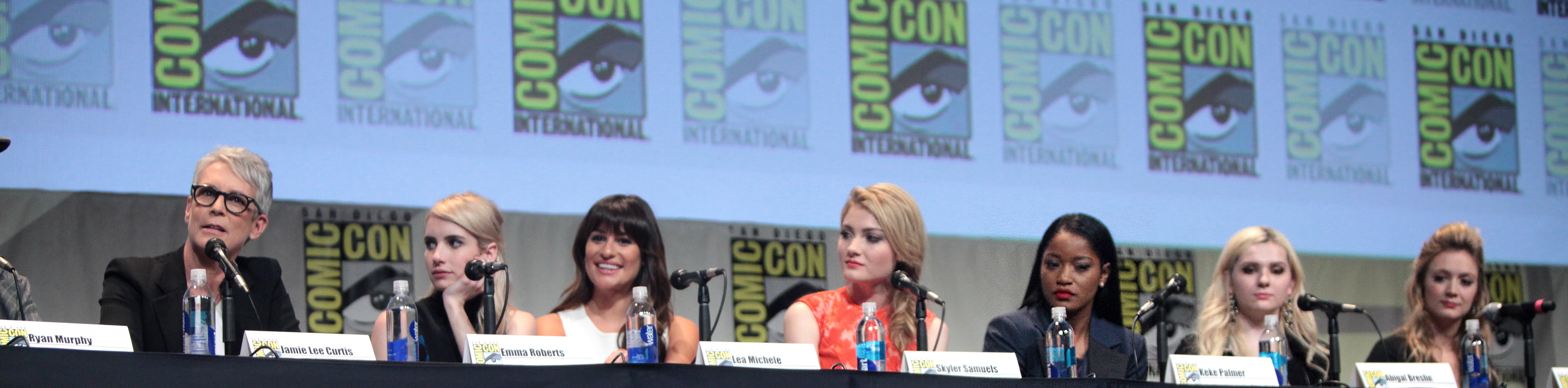
Scream Queens cast at 2015 San Diego Comic-Con. L–R: Jamie Lee Curtis, Emma Roberts, Lea Michele, Skyler Samuels, Keke Palmer, Abigail Breslin, Billie Lourd

It's Mean Girls meets Friday the 13th. I think it's laugh-out-loud funny, it's edge-of-your-seat scary and everyone is wearing Chanel. What other reasons do you need [to watch]?

— Lead actress Emma Roberts on the series

In December 2014, it was reported that Emma Roberts and Jamie Lee Curtis would be featured as series regulars. In January 2015, Lea Michele, Joe Manganiello, Keke Palmer, and Abigail Breslin joined the series' main cast, as well as actress/singer Ariana Grande in a recurring capacity. Later that month, The Hollywood Reporter confirmed that Nick Jonas would recur throughout the first season. In February 2015, newcomer Billie Lourd and Skyler Samuels joined the series' main cast. Later in the month, Niecy Nash joined the recurring cast as Denise, and British actor Lucien Laviscount, Diego Boneta and Glen Powell were confirmed as regulars.

In March 2015, Nasim Pedrad was cast as a series regular. On March 13, previously cast Manganiello was forced to depart the series, due to publicity obligations for his film Magic Mike XXL. Oliver Hudson was hired as his replacement. On June 24, it was announced that Charisma Carpenter and Roger Bart would portray Chanel #2's (Grande) parents. In August 2015, Philip Casnoff was cast as Cathy's (Curtis) husband. In September 2015, Murphy announced, through his Twitter feed, that Patrick Schwarzenegger had joined the cast. He will portray Chad's (Powell) younger brother, Thad. Chad's older brother, Brad, will be played by Chad Michael Murray; while Alan Thicke and Julia Duffy have been cast as Mr. and Mrs. Radwell.

John Stamos, Taylor Lautner, and Colton Haynes joined the second season. On July 28, 2016, it was announced that Jerry O'Connell and Laura Bell Bundy will have recurring roles.

=== Filming ===
Ryan and Brad and Ian are geniuses, and they get it right. They get it right as a duo, and they get it right as a trio. So I trust Ryan with my life – literally, my career, my life, whatever the f— [sic] he wants me to do. You want me to wear a neck brace and talk about how I love having sex with dead bodies? I'm all yours.

— Co-star Lea Michele on working with the series' creators.

The series began principal photography on March 12, 2015, in New Orleans, Louisiana. Exterior campus scenes were shot at Tulane University. The show completed filming of the pilot episode in April 2015, with filming for the remaining first season installments commencing in early June 2015. Murphy, Brennan, and Falchuk were said to be the first season's sole directors; however, this was later proven not to be the case.

Curtis filmed an intricate homage to her mother's, Janet Leigh, classic shower scene in Psycho. Falchuk spoke about being hesitant to include the scene, "I thought, 'Can I do this? Do I need to ask her?' So then I wrote it and then got a text from her very quickly after she read the script. Her text was, 'We need to do this shot-for-shot.' Then, typical Jamie Lee, she started sending me all the websites and Tumblrs that have each shot laid out and storyboarded." Curtis bought out a greeting card company that had the image of her mother screaming, and placed one near the monitor. She viewed the Psycho scene several times between takes, matching the smallest details, such as which hand reaches for the bar of soap, and twitches of the eye. "It's a big deal and I don't take it lightly," Falchuk concluded, "...that she went for it like that was very moving for me."

The second season saw production move from New Orleans, Louisiana, to Los Angeles, California; after scoring a significant tax credit. Principal photography commenced in July 2016.

==== Main title sequence ====
The title sequence for the series was designed by Kyle Cooper and features Roberts, Michele, Samuels, Palmer, Boneta, Powell, Breslin, and Lourd in an homage to 80's horror flicks. An original song, "You Belong to Me" is performed by singer Heather Heywood, which was written by show composer Mac Quayle, Heywood, and executive producer Alexis Martin Woodall. The title sequence only appeared in the fifth episode "Pumpkin Patch", though it was trimmed down to under a minute due to time constraints.

=== Marketing ===
On February 13, 2015, Fox released the first teaser trailer for the series on YouTube. Another teaser followed on March 13, featuring Roberts, and another aired during the first-season finale of Empire, featuring Palmer. On April 9, 2015, another teaser was released featuring Roberts, and once again on April 27. Later that month, Entertainment Weekly released a series of exclusive posters. Exclusive poster art was found at Six Flags locations throughout the summer. On May 19, 2015, the first full-length trailer was released. On July 1, 2015, cast portraits were released.

== Broadcast ==
The series had its world premiere at the 2015 Comic-Con in July. In late August, free screenings of the pilot along with two other new Fox pilots were held in select cities. In the United States, it premiered on Fox on September 22, 2015. In Canada, Scream Queens airs simultaneously with the U.S. on Citytv.

On October 26, 2015, the series premiered E4 in the United Kingdom and Ireland. After the season two hiatus, the show moved to a late night timeslot, airing Thursdays at Midnight. In Australia, the series debuted on Ten on September 23, 2015, before moving to its sister channel, Eleven, with episode two on the same day.

Following the acquisition of 21st Century Fox by Disney, Scream Queens was made available internationally on Disney+ under the dedicated streaming hub Star on February 23, 2021. In the United States, the series is available on Hulu.

On June 1, 2022, it was made available on the CW Seed following a licensing deal with Disney.

== Reception ==
=== Critical response ===
Scream Queens received mixed reviews from critics in its first season. On review aggregator Rotten Tomatoes, the first season has a 68% approval rating based on 148 reviews, with an average rating of 6.3/10. The site's critical consensus reads, "Too tasteless for mainstream viewers and too silly for horror enthusiasts, Scream Queens fails to satisfy." On Metacritic, the season was given a score of 59 out of 100, based on 33 critics, indicating "mixed or average reviews". IGN reviewer Terri Schwartz gave a very positive review of the two-episode premiere, giving it a 9.7 out of 10, stating "Ryan Murphy has worked his TV magic again with a killer start to Scream Queens. From the acting to the costuming to the writing, everything about this concept and execution works [and] offers up enough mystery and intrigue to keep even the biggest skeptic entertained." Ed Power of The Telegraph also gave the premiere a positive review, awarding it four out of five stars. Brian Lowry of Variety, remarked in his review of the finale, "Murphy's real genius stems from an ability to promote his shows through concept and casting, the tradeoff being that those qualities have a bad habit of trumping execution", earlier noting "The big reveal in the finale wasn't particularly revealing, mostly because the narrative had been such a madcap mess in the preceding weeks that any suspense had dissipated long ago."

The second season received more positive reviews from critics. Rotten Tomatoes reported an 86% approval rating based on seven reviews with an average rating of 7.1/10, and provided no critical consensus. The average Nielsen viewership ratings for the second season were roughly half of that of the first season, including a 48% decrease in live viewership and a 51.2% decrease in "live + 7-day DVR" viewership. Orly Greenberg, from the Observer, gave a mixed review of the second-season premiere, complimenting the casting of John Stamos as a positive addition but noted problems in the overall execution, stating "season two feels just slightly stronger than the previous semi–disaster of a season last year ... Its tone is scattered [and] its acting is inconsistent at best." In her review of the finale, she stated "This season finale resolved nothing, mostly because there was nothing to resolve. This was honestly and truly the most anti-climactic season closer I've ever seen ... neither mysterious nor intriguing. Instead it was vaguely just ... present." Brian Moylan of Vulture remarked in his finale review that "nothing about this season made sense. [Scream Queens] at its best [is] a campy treat that doesn't need logic because it has smarts, sass, and plenty of bitchiness to keep everything humming. This season lacked all of that. It seemed like a lame retread of an idea that ran out of steam 15 episodes ago." He gave the finale two out of five stars.

=== Ratings ===
Viewership and ratings per season of Scream Queens
Season	Timeslot (ET)	Episodes	First aired		Last aired		TV season	Viewership rank	Avg. viewers (millions)	18–49 rank	Avg. 18–49 rating
Season	Timeslot (ET)	Episodes	Date	Viewers (millions)	Date	Viewers (millions)	TV season	Viewership rank	Avg. viewers (millions)	18–49 rank	Avg. 18–49 rating
1	Tuesday 9:00 p.m.	13	September 22, 2015	4.04	December 8, 2015	2.53	2015–16	103	4.72	47	2.0
2	Tuesday 9:00 p.m.	10	September 20, 2016	2.17	December 20, 2016	1.37	2016–17	145	2.28	115	1.0

== Recognition and accolades ==
=== Fashion ===
The show has often been noted for its distinctive fashions. With the direction of Murphy who "wanted the girls to look like candy" and a fundamental pastel theme, costume designer Lou Eyrich sought inspiration from Clueless (1995), Mean Girls (2004), and Heathers (1989), 2015 Spring and Fall trend reports, and enlisted the help of Moschino creative director Jeremy Scott. Early in its September 2015 airing, Vogue regarded the series as "Fall TV's Most Stylist Show", while Teen Vogue regarded Emma Roberts' character Chanel Oberlin as "one of the most stylish TV characters ever."

In September 2016, the show's fashions were included in an exhibit at the Fashion Institute of Design and Merchandising Museum's 10th Annual Outstanding Art of Television Costume Design.

=== Awards and nominations ===
Year	Award	Category	Recipient(s)	Result	Ref.
2015	Critics' Choice Television Awards	Most Exciting New Series	Scream Queens	Won	
2016	Dorian Awards	Campy TV Show of the Year	Scream Queens	Nominated	
2016	People's Choice Awards	Favorite New TV Comedy	Scream Queens	Won	
2016	People's Choice Awards	Favorite Actress in a New TV Series	Emma Roberts	Nominated	
2016	People's Choice Awards	Favorite Actress in a New TV Series	Lea Michele	Nominated	
2016	People's Choice Awards	Favorite Actress in a New TV Series	Jamie Lee Curtis	Nominated	
2016	Golden Globe Awards	Best Actress – TV Series Musical or Comedy	Jamie Lee Curtis	Nominated	
2016	Satellite Awards	Best Actress – TV Series Musical or Comedy	Jamie Lee Curtis	Nominated	
2016	Fangoria Chainsaw Awards	Best TV Supporting Actress	Jamie Lee Curtis	Nominated	
2016	Make-Up Artists & Hair Stylists Guild Awards	TV Mini-Series (MOW) – Best Contemporary Make-Up	Eryn Krueger Mekash, Kelley Mitchell, Melissa Buell	Won	
2016	Teen Choice Awards	Choice TV Show: Comedy	Scream Queens	Nominated	
2016	Teen Choice Awards	Choice TV Actress: Comedy	Emma Roberts	Nominated	
2016	Teen Choice Awards	Choice TV Actress: Comedy	Lea Michele	Nominated	
2016	Teen Choice Awards	Choice TV: Villain	Lea Michele	Nominated	
2017	Make-Up Artists & Hair Stylists Guild Awards	Television and New Media Series – Best Contemporary Hair Styling	Crystal Cook, Anna Quinn, Ai Nakata	Nominated	
2017	Teen Choice Awards	Choice TV Actress: Comedy	Emma Roberts	Nominated	
2017	Teen Choice Awards	Choice Scene Stealer	Taylor Lautner	Nominated	

== Future ==
Following the show's cancellation in 2017, fans have been waiting for a continuation of the series in some form. Scream Queens also developed a big cult following worldwide due to its availability on Hulu and Disney+.

In February 2020, series co-creator Ryan Murphy, reveal he contacted series' stars Emma Roberts, Lea Michele and Billie Lourd to discuss an idea for a third season of the show, he wrote on Instagram "Emma, Billie, Lea and I have mused on it, but question: should it be a six episode limited? A catch up movie? Who should I bring back? Would love your thoughts. So many questions...." In May 2020, he reveal he was working on a new season for the show.

In August 2022, series' star, Emma Roberts, spoke about the third season of the show, saying "now's the time" to revive the show; she said "I mean, look, I want a Scream Queens Season 3 and I think now's the time. I don't actually know who's in charge of the yes or no to that, but yes, we should make that happen." In July 2025, cast member, Lea Michele, who portrayed Hester Ulrich/Chanel #6 on the show, also expressed her interest in a third season, "Emma and I tell [Ryan Murphy] all the time... We want to do it so badly. I think it would be so fun. Yeah, I'm in," Michele said.

In August 2025, during an interview with The Hollywood Reporter, series co-creator Ian Brennan, shared his plans and ideas for a potential third season, he declared "What we were going to do in the second season, which I would probably do in a third, would be to set it at a camp. Scream Queens would be set at a Friday the 13th camp."

In October 2025, Roberts and fellow guest star, Ariana Grande were cast in the thirteenth season of the FX's show, American Horror Story; however, Grande dropped out of the series in July 2026 due to her Eternal Sunshine tour commitments. In September 2026, at the '13' premiere, Murphy revealed he was planning to do a crossover between both shows during the season, with Grande reprising her role as Chanel #2; the plans for the crossover went down when Grande exited the project, he stated "It was funny because at one point I was going to have the Scream Queens come on to this season, but Ariana was touring and I couldn’t make it work." He also said he hadn't "given up" on reviving the show, stating "Emma [Roberts] and I were talking about that yesterday. You know, they want me to do it. I don’t know." "Emma really wants to do it. I know Billie wants to do it. Lea wants to do it. Ariana wants to do it and Glen [Powell], my favorite of all time."

== See also ==
- American Crime Story, a true crime anthology produced by Falchuk and Murphy which airs on Fox sister channel FX
- American Horror Story, a horror anthology produced by Falchuk and Murphy which airs on Fox sister channel FX
- Feud, a dramatic period anthology produced by Falchuk and Murphy which airs on Fox sister channel FX
