= Mommie Dearest (Scream Queens) =

- Scream Queens episode
- Episode no.: Season 1 Episode 8
- Directed by: Michael Uppendahl
- Written by: Ian Brennan
- Production code: 1AYD08
- Original air date: November 10, 2015
- Running time: 43 minutes

Guest appearances
- Nick Jonas as Boone Clemens; Niecy Nash as Denise Hemphill; Breezy Eslin as Jennifer "Candle Vlogger"; Anna Grace Barlow as Bethany Stevens/Mary Mulligan; Dan Hildebrand as Detective Baxter; Daniel Donahue as Detective Chiselhurst

Episode chronology
← Previous "Beware of Young Girls"	Next → "Ghost Stories"

"Mommie Dearest" is the eighth episode of the horror black comedy series Scream Queens. It first aired on November 10, 2015, on Fox. The episode was directed by Michael Uppendahl and written by Ian Brennan. The episode was watched by 2.51 million viewers and received positive reviews from critics.

== Plot ==
Grace and Cathy Munsch discuss the baby in the bathtub incident. Grace is angry that Munsch will not offer up any information and the discussion ends with Grace storming out of Cathy's office. After being attacked by two Red Devils, Cathy is more willing to talk. She hands Grace a file containing the name of the girl who died in the tub. Upon studying the file, Grace realizes that, contrary to what she believed, she was not the bathtub baby.

Back at Kappa house, The Chanels gather evidence to prove that Zayday and Grace are the killers.

Jennifer is murdered by the Red Devil while hosting her web show. The Chanels and Denise find her body is posed in the dinner table, covered in melted wax and surrounded by candles. Jennifer's murder leads Cathy to close the university indefinitely, and a candle light vigil is held for Jennifer.

It is revealed that Grace's mother was Bethany Stevens, the ruthless Kappa president in 1995 who refused to help Sophia.

The episode ends with Boone on the phone with the Red Devil. Boone states that Gigi is the only thing standing in their way and he plans to get rid of her.

== Production ==
For this episode, Jamie Lee Curtis recreated the infamous shower scene featuring her mother, Janet Leigh from the 1960 film Psycho. Special guest stars returning in this episode include Nick Jonas as Boone Clemens, who faked his death and has been absent since the end of the second episode, Hell Week, and Niecy Nash as Denise Hemphill, the kick-butt but strange security guard. The other recurring characters are Jennifer "Candle Vlogger" (Breezy Eslin), Bethany Stevens (Anna Grace Barlow), who is revealed to be Grace Gardner's mother who changed her name to Mary Mulligan after the events of 1995 flashback incident, Dan Hildebrand as Detective Baxter, and Daniel Donahue as Detective Chiselhurst, the latter two are the British detectives hired by Chanel to prove Zayday and Grace are the killers.

== Reception ==
=== Ratings ===
Mommie Dearest was watched live by 2.51 million U.S. viewers and got a 0.9 rating/3 share in the adult 18-49 demographic.

=== Critical reception ===
This episode received positive reviews from critics. Terri Schwartz from IGN gave Mommie Dearest a 7.0 citing that "Unless there's some big plot turn coming up, this week's episode highlighted how the relatively simple plot isn't enough to sustain this whole series. But overall "Mommie Dearest" was one of the show's weaker installments." Meryl Gottlieb from The Post Athens gave the episode a positive review; "“Mommie Dearest” was definitely one of the best episodes of the season. Scream Queens still needs to work on finding the best balance between characters. It's either heavily saturated with someone or that character isn't featured at all." The A.V. Club's LaToya Ferguson gave the episode C−. She said that "If you’re at home, trying to solve the mystery, then this episode is a necessary one. It’s nothing much overall, but certainly gets the job done better than last week’s return."
