= Anna Margaret =

American singer-songwriter and actress

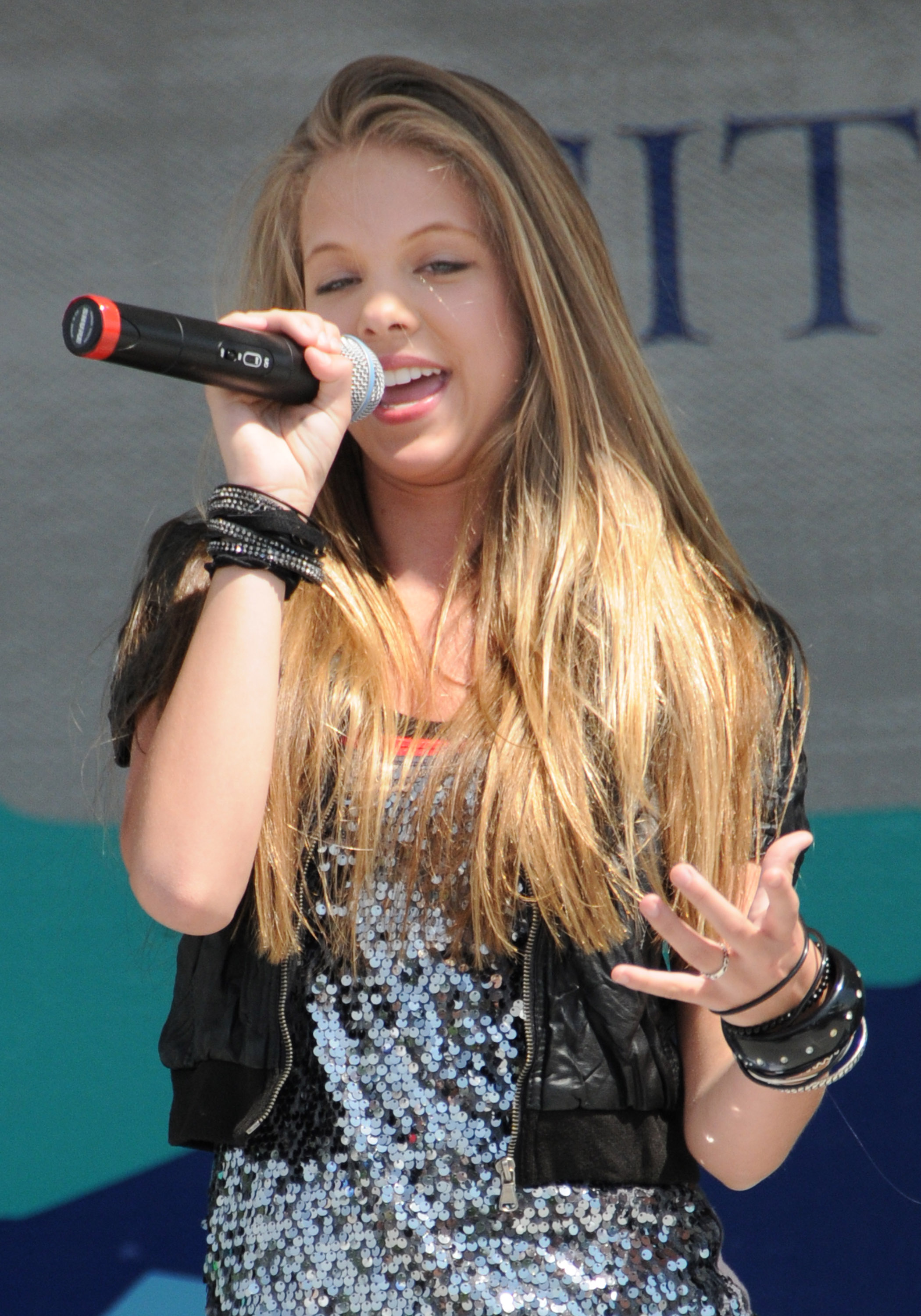
- Margaret in 2010

Background information
- Born: Anna Margaret Collins; June 12, 1996 (age 30); Lecompte, Louisiana, U.S.
- Genres: Pop
- Occupations: Singer-songwriter, actress
- Instrument: Vocals
- Years active: 2008–present
- Labels: Walt Disney, Hollywood

Anna Margaret Ray (born June 12, 1996; née Collins) is an American singer-songwriter and actress. She is best known for her work on the soundtrack of the Disney Channel Original Movie, Starstruck.

== Early life ==
Anna Margaret Collins was born in Lecompte, Louisiana but moved to, and was raised in, Alexandria, Louisiana. Her family consists of mother Amy Collins, father, sister Ellie, and brother, Grant. Since she was six years old, she has performed at talent shows and taken vocal lessons. Her family drove on weekends to New Orleans for auditions and acting classes, hoping she would land a part that would include singing. She also transferred from attending private school to being home-schooled and attended Alexandria Senior High in Alexandria, Louisiana.

== Discography ==
=== Singles ===
Year	Title	Album
2009	Let It Snow	All Wrapped Up Vol. 2
2010	Something About The Sunshine	Starstruck
2010	New Boyfriend	Starstruck
2010	Girl Thing	Den Brother
2011	I Wanna Go	Summer Nightastic
2011	Speechless	Non-album single
2011	All Electric (With Nevermind)	Shake It Up: Break It Down

== Music videos ==
Year	Title	Album
2010	"Something About the Sunshine"	Starstruck
2010	"Girl Thing"	Den Brother
2010	"Speechless"	Non-album single

== Filmography ==
Television
Year	Title	Role	Notes
2008	B.T.K.	Sarah	as Anna Margaret Collins
2010	Be Good to Eddie Lee	Christie	Television short
2012	Brother White	Emma	as Anna Margaret Collins
2014	When the Game Stands Tall	Laurie	as Anna Margaret Collins
2015	Scream Queens	Coco Cohen	as Anna Margaret; Episodes: "Pilot", "Hell Week", "Haunted House"
2015	Instant Mom	Emily	Episodes: "Instant Prom" and "Bag Lady"
2017	Speech & Debate	Casey Thronburn	
2017	Rock, Paper, Scissors/Rock Paper Dead	Zoe Palmer	
2018	Cut Off	Charlene	
