= Jan Hoag =

American film and television actress (born 1948)

- Born: September 19, 1948 (age 78); Portland, Oregon, U.S.
- Education: Oregon State University
- Occupation: Actress

Janet A. Hoag (born September 19, 1948) is an American film and television actress. Her first major feature film role was in Brian Yuzna's slasher film The Dentist (1996). She later had minor supporting roles in the films Christmas with the Kranks (2004), Wild (2014) and Steven Spielberg's The Fabelmans (2022).

Hoag has appeared as a guest star in numerous television series, including recurring roles on 8 Simple Rules (2004), Scream Queens (2015), and Big Shot (2021).

== Early life ==
Hoag was born September 19, 1948, in Portland, Oregon. She graduated from Holy Child Academy in Portland and later attended Oregon State University, graduating with a degree in business.

She later worked in managerial positions for the Portland-based department store Meier and Frank before taking a sales management position in Southern California. Hoag was inspired to act after attending theatre productions in Los Angeles. She abandoned her sales career and enrolled at the Lee Strasberg Institute to study acting.

== Career ==
Since the beginning of the 1990s, Hoag has appeared in several television series, including Murder, She Wrote, Step by Step, Married... with Children, Melrose Place, Murphy Brown, Providence, Judging Amy, The Norm Show, Buffy the Vampire Slayer, 8 Simple Rules, Sunset Beach, Desperate Housewives, Gilmore Girls, Boston Legal, Mad Men, Coop & Cami Ask the World and others, although always playing minor characters. She guest starred on Glee in the episode "I Kissed a Girl", and in The Big Bang Theory in the season 6 episode "The Re-Entry Minimization". Hoag had a recurring character as Agatha Bean on the first season of Scream Queens.

She has also appeared in some feature films, including The Dentist (1996), Progeny (1998), Raising Flagg, and Wild (2014). Subsequent film roles include in Karyn Kusama's thriller Destroyer (2018). In 2022, she had a minor supporting role in Steven Spielberg's The Fabelmans.

== Filmography ==
=== Film ===
Year	Title	Role	Notes
1991	My Heroes Have Always Been Cowboys	Nurse	
1996	The Dentist	Candy	
1998	Progeny	Nurse Ida	
2000	The Extreme Adventures of Super Dave	Super Fan	
2000	Disney's The Kid	Newsstand Tourist	
2000	In the Light of the Moon	Judy Anderson	
2002	Role of a Lifetime	Chick's Receptionist	
2004	Christmas with the Kranks	Choir Director	
2005	Dating Games People Play	Saphron Jenkins	
2006	Raising Flagg	Judge Walters	
2007	Evan Almighty	Neighbor	
2010	Faster	Receptionist	
2014	Small Time	Woman Buying Truck	
2014	Wild	Annette	
2018	Destroyer	Toby's Mother	
2019	The Laundromat	Funeral Woman	Uncredited
2019	3 from Hell	Guard Betty Lou	
2022	The Fabelmans	Nona	
TBA	They Follow †	TBA	Post-production

=== Television ===
Year	Title	Role	Notes
1990	Murder, She Wrote	Book Lover	Episode: "The Great Twain Robbery"
1991	Columbo	Woman	Episode: "Caution: Murder Can Be Hazardous to Your Health"
1991	Who's the Boss?	Jan	Episode: "A Well-Kept Housekeeper"
1991	Silk Stalkings	Kim	Episode: "Men Seeking Women"
1991	Baby Talk	Santa's Visitor	Episode: "Away in a Manger"
1992	The Price She Paid	Mrs. Jacobs	Television film
1992	A Message from Holly	Mistress	Television film
1993	Step by Step	Fan #2	Episode: "The Un-Natural"
1994	Armed and Innocent	Sandy	Television film
1994	Dave's World	Dave	Episode: "The Funeral"
1994	Married... with Children	Checker #1	Episode: "Assault and Batteries"
1994	Roseanne & Tom: Behind the Scenes	Geraldine	Television film
1995	The Courtyard	Medical Examiner	Television film
1995	Melrose Place	Nurse Kelly	3 episodes
1997	Murphy Brown	Assistant	Episode: "When One Door Closes..."
1997	The Visitor	Nurse	Episode: "Reunion"
1998	Sunset Beach	Doreen	Episode #1.319
1998	The Christmas Wish	Mrs. Baker	Television film
1999	G vs E	Cheryl	Episode: "Airplane"
1999	Silk Hope	Pig Farmer	Television film
1999, 2001	The Norm Show	Margaret Barrow	2 episodes
2000	Providence	Apartment Agent	Episode: "The Apartment"
2000	L.A. 7	Mrs. Buddy	Episode: "Fall Out"
2000	The Last Dance	Zeena	Television film
2000	Judging Amy	Alison Schaeffer	Episode: "Waterworld"
2001	Any Day Now	Daisy	Episode: "The Contest"
2001	The Ellen Show	Francine	Episode: "Muskrat Love"
2002	Buffy the Vampire Slayer	Cousin Carol	Episode: "Hell's Bells"
2004	8 Simple Rules	Secretary	2 episodes
2004	Desperate Housewives	Beefy Middle-Aged Woman	Episode: "Ah, But Underneath"
2005	Eyes	Tracy Williams	Episode: "Trial"
2005	Medium	Middle Aged Woman	Episode: "Judge, Jury and Executioner"
2006	Malcolm in the Middle	Receptionist	Episode: "Stevie in the Hospital"
2006	Gilmore Girls	Nurse	Episode: "Super Cool Party People"
2006	Without a Trace	Ms. Ford	Episode: "Requiem"
2006	Boston Legal	Jane Baker	Episode: "Fine Young Cannibal"
2007	The News	Stage Manager	Television film
2008	Nip/Tuck	Margot	Episode: "Kyle Ainge"
2008	Mad Men	Edith Schilling	Episode: "The Benefactor"
2009	Saving Grace	Molly	Episode: "We're Already Here"
2009	Brothers	Mrs. Murphy	Episode: "Mom at Bar/Train Buddy"
2009	Criminal Minds	Betts	Episode: "Retaliation"
2011	The Middle	Nurse Fahler	Episode: "Back to Summer"
2011	Glee	Roberta	Episode: "I Kissed a Girl"
2012	The Big Bang Theory	Lillian	Episode: "The Re-Entry Minimization"
2014	Shameless	Sister Ann Halloran	Episode: "Iron City"
2015	Scream Queens	Ms. Agatha Bean	3 episodes
2016	The Young Pope	Rose	2 episodes
2019	Baskets	Nurse	Episode: "Common Room Wake"
2020	Coop & Cami Ask the World	Bidder	Episode: "Would You Wrather Trash a Friend?"
2021–2022	Big Shot	Carol	2 episodes
2023	How I Met Your Father	Phyllis	Episode: "Rewardshment"
2023	Grey's Anatomy	Natalie	Episode: "Cowgirls Don't Cry"
2023	Young Sheldon	Gwen	Episode: "A New Weather Girl and a Stay-at-Home Coddler"
