= Skyler Samuels =

American actress (born 1994)

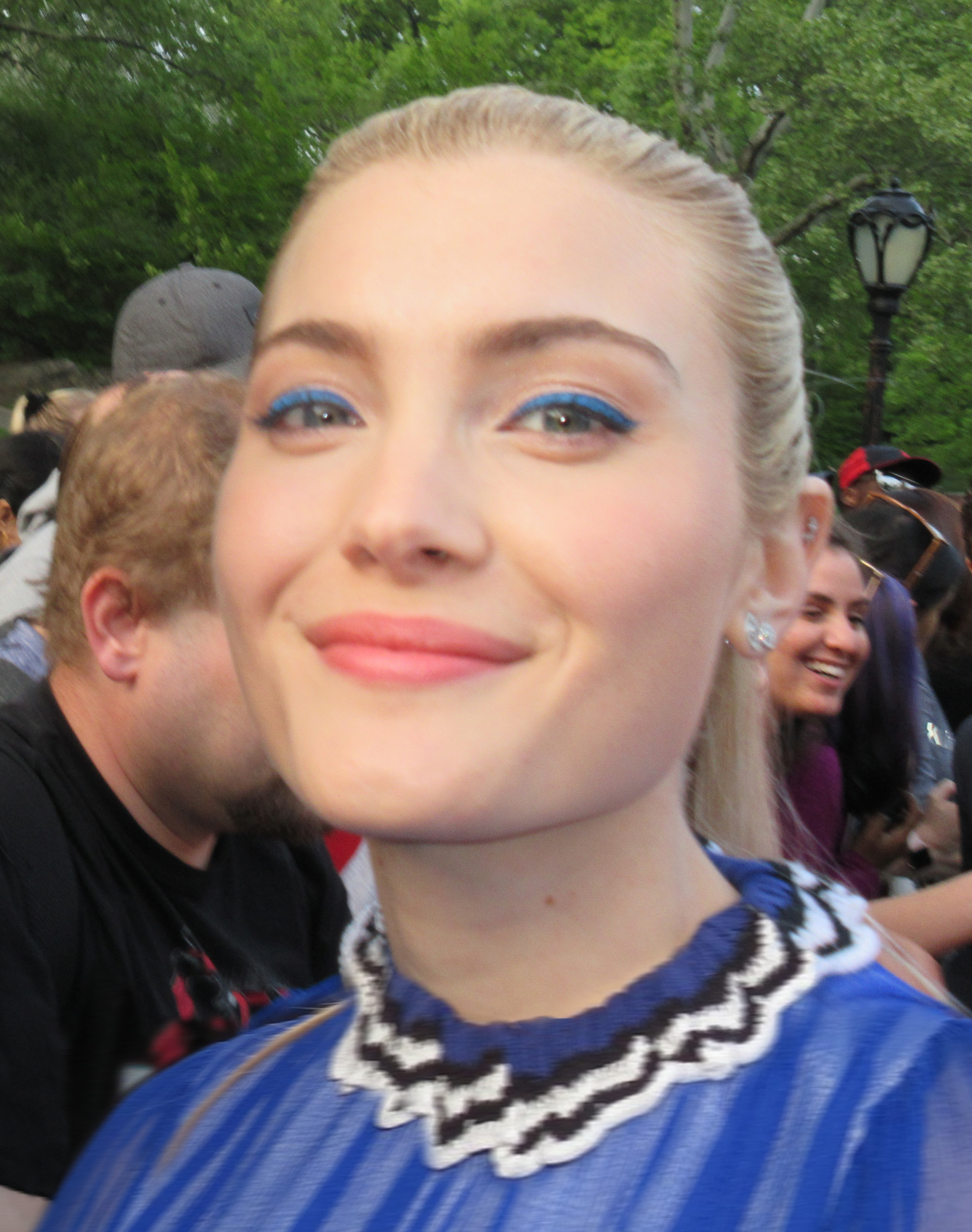
- Samuels in 2018
- Born: April 14, 1994 (age 32); Los Angeles, California, U.S.
- Education: Stanford University
- Occupation: Actress
- Years active: 2004–present
- Television: The Gates; The Nine Lives of Chloe King; Scream Queens; The Gifted
- Spouse: Lucas Till (m. 2024)
- Children: 2

Skyler Samuels (born April 14, 1994) is an American actress, known for her roles in the television series Wizards of Waverly Place, The Gates, The Nine Lives of Chloe King, Scream Queens and The Gifted.

== Early life ==
Samuels was born in Los Angeles, the daughter of Kathy, a producer for unscripted series, and Scott, a U.S. marshal. She has three brothers and a sister.

== Career ==
Samuels held a recurring role as Gertrude "Gigi" Hollingsworth in Wizards of Waverly Place on Disney Channel. She also played the child celebrity Ashley Blake on the Drake & Josh episode "Little Diva". She then appeared in the films The Stepfather (2009) and Furry Vengeance (2010). She also starred in the ABC series The Gates as Andie Bates and the ABC Family series The Nine Lives of Chloe King, in which she played Chloe.

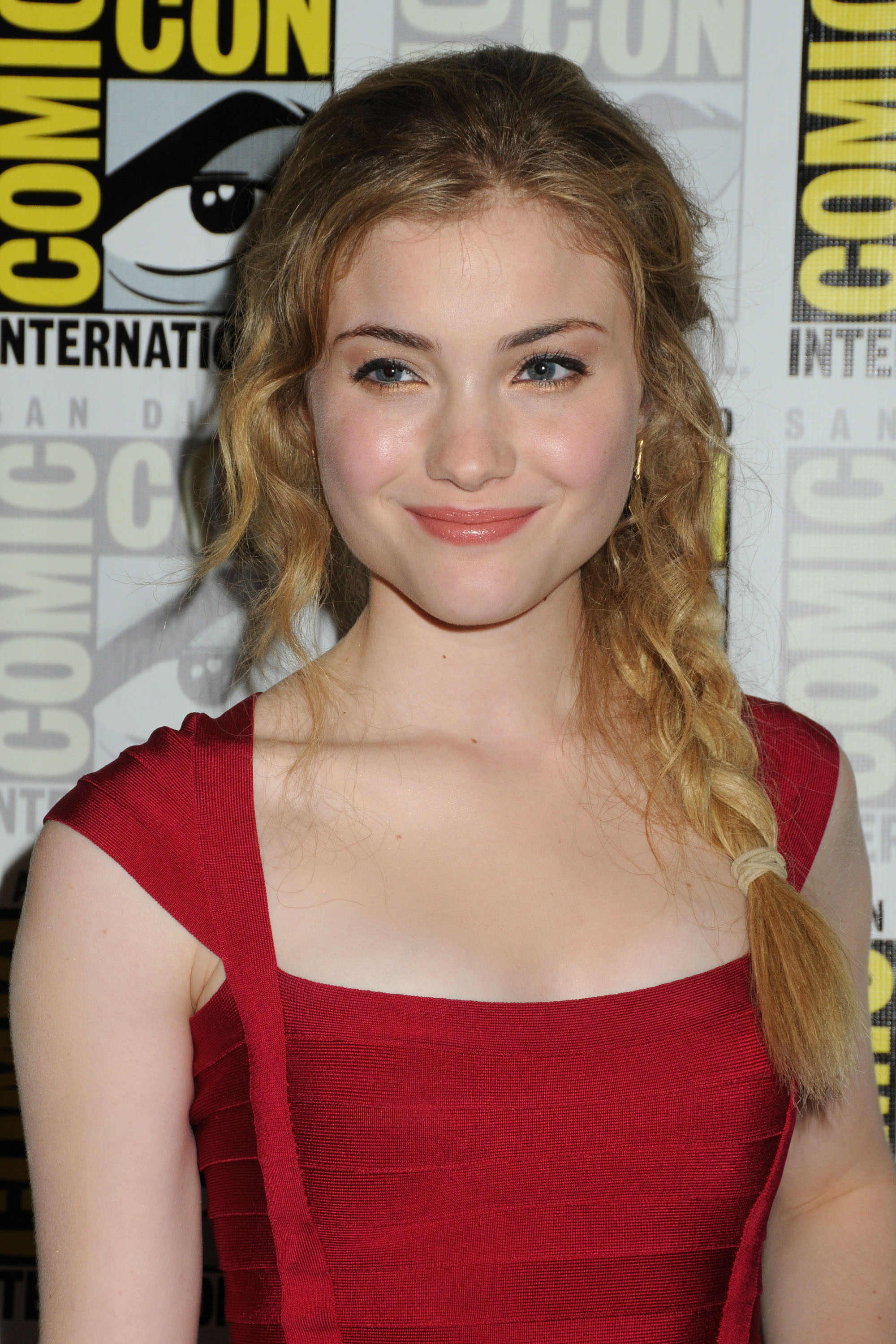
Samuels at the 2011 San Diego Comic-Con

Samuels next appeared in the recurring role of Bonnie Lipton in the fourth season of the FX horror series American Horror Story. She co-starred with Mae Whitman and Bella Thorne in the high school comedy film The DUFF (2015). She played a leading role in season one of the Fox horror comedy series Scream Queens. (2017). Samuels appears in a recurring role as the three Frost sisters (the Stepford Cuckoos) in the X-Men-based Fox television series The Gifted.

Samuels appeared in Meg 2: The Trench as Jess.

== Personal life ==
Samuels studied marketing and intellectual property at Stanford University. Taking off a quarter to film Scream Queens, she returned to school in January 2016 and graduated in June 2016. She was a member of the Kappa Alpha Theta sorority.

Around 2017-2018, Samuels began dating actor Lucas Till. In March 2024, Samuels said that they had married and were then residing in Till's hometown of Atlanta, Georgia. In May 2024, Samuels announced that they had welcomed their first child earlier that year. In December 2025, Samuels announced that they are expecting their second child.

== Filmography ==
Key
†	Denotes works that have not yet been released

=== Film ===
Year	Title	Role	Notes
2005	Junior Pilot	Mary Jo	Video
2005	The Adventures of Big Handsome Guy and His Little Friend	Young Super Hot Girl	Short film
2005	A Host of Trouble	Maureen	Short film
2009	The Stepfather	Beth Harding	
2010	Furry Vengeance	Amber	
2014	Helicopter Mom	Carrie	
2015	The DUFF	Jess Harris	
2016	The Last Virgin in LA	Courtney	Short film
2018	Public Disturbance	Kasey	
2018	Sharon 1.2.3.	Sharon #3	
2018	Spare Room	Lillian	
2021	Masquerade	Woman	
2021	For Every Good Invention	Mary	Short film
2023	Meg 2: The Trench	Jess	

=== Television ===
Year	Title	Role	Notes
2004	Drake & Josh	Ashley Blake	Episode: "Little Diva"
2005	The Suite Life of Zack & Cody	Brianna	Episode: "The Fairest of Them All"
2005	That's So Raven	Chrissy Collins	Episode: "Goin' Hollywood"
2006	Love, Inc.	Maureen	Episode: "Arrested Development"
2007–2008	Wizards of Waverly Place	Gigi Hollingsworth	3 episodes
2009	Bless This Mess	Libby	Television film
2010	The Gates	Andie Bates	Main role
2011	The Nine Lives of Chloe King	Chloe King	Lead role
2013	Bloodline	Bird Benson	Television film
2014	American Horror Story: Freak Show	Bonnie Lipton	4 episodes
2015	Scream Queens	Grace Gardner	Main role (season 1)
2017–2019	The Gifted	The Frost sisters (Esme, Sophie and Phoebe)	Main role (season 2); recurring role (season 1)
2021	The Rookie	Charlotte Luster	Episode: "True Crime"
2021	Showmance	Casey	Main role
2021	Switched Before Birth	Olivia Crawford	Television film
2022	The Gabby Petito Story	Gabby Petito	Television film; also executive producer
2023	Aurora Teagarden Mysteries: Something New	Aurora Teagarden	Television film
2024	My Dreams of You	Grace	Television film
2024	Aurora Teagarden Mysteries: A Lesson in Murder	Aurora Teagarden	Television film
2024	Aurora Teagarden Mysteries: Death at the Diner	Aurora Teagarden	Television film

== Awards ==
Year	Award	Category	Work	Result
2011	Teen Choice Award	Choice Breakout Show	The Nine Lives of Chloe King	Nominated
2011	Teen Choice Award	Choice Breakout Star	—	Nominated
2018	Napa Valley Film Festival	Audience Award	Spare Room	Won
2019	Mammoth Film Festival	Acting	N/A	Won
