= Glen Powell =

American actor (born 1988)

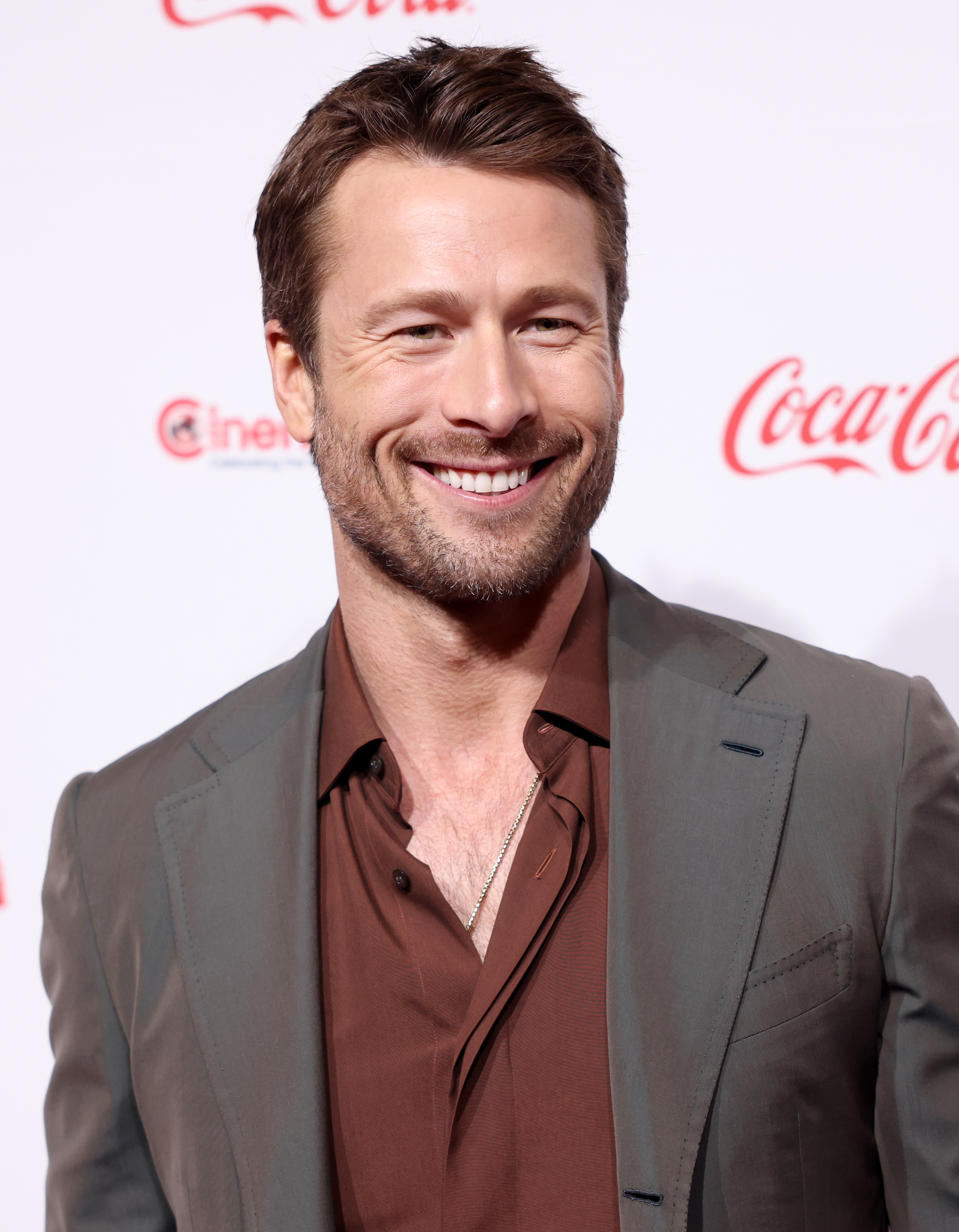
- Powell in 2025
- Born: Glen Thomas Powell Jr. October 21, 1988 (age 38); Austin, Texas, U.S.
- Occupations: Actor; writer; producer
- Years active: 2003–present
- Awards: Full list

Glen Thomas Powell Jr. (born October 21, 1988) is an American actor, writer, and producer. He began his career with small roles on television and in films including Spy Kids 3-D: Game Over (2003) and Fast Food Nation (2006). Powell acted in the action film The Expendables 3 (2014), the comedy-horror series Scream Queens (2015–2016), the teen comedy Everybody Wants Some!! (2016), the historical romance The Guernsey Literary and Potato Peel Pie Society (2018) and the romantic comedy Set It Up (2018). He also portrayed astronaut John Glenn in Hidden Figures (2016), which earned him an Actor Award, and aviator Tom Hudner in Devotion (2022).

Powell became widely known with his role in the action film Top Gun: Maverick (2022) and the romantic comedy Anyone but You (2023). He went on to star in the dark comedy Hit Man (2023), which he also co-wrote and produced, the disaster film Twisters (2024), the action film The Running Man (2025), and co-created, produced and starred in the comedy series Chad Powers (2025–present). For Hit Man and Chad Powers, he earned consecutive nominations at the Golden Globes.

== Early life and education ==
Glen Thomas Powell Jr. was born on October 21, 1988 in Austin, Texas to Glen Powell Sr., an executive coach, and Cyndy, a homemaker; he has two sisters. Powell attended Canyon Vista Middle School before he graduated from Westwood High School in Austin, Texas in 2007, where he played football and lacrosse. He attended the University of Texas at Austin (UT) for one year, calling it "the greatest year of [his] entire life", but dropped out and did not finish his degree. He initially expected to complete the requirements in spring 2024, then pushed to spring 2025, but since his schedule limited his time commitments, he put off his goal to spring 2027. As of November 2025, he was enrolled in UT's Radio-Television-Film program, taking classes over Zoom. As of 2025, Powell remains enrolled at the University of Texas at Austin as a Radio-Television-Film student in the Moody College of Communication and is expected to graduate in May 2027. He has also returned to campus for events, including screenings and promotional appearances for projects such as Chad Powers.

As a Radio-Television-Film student, Powell also participated in the University of Texas at Austin’s Semester in Los Angeles (UTLA) program, where he spent time living and working in Los Angeles while completing coursework and internships in the entertainment industry.

== Career ==
=== 2003–2017: Early work and breakthrough ===
Powell's acting career began while working with Antonio Banderas and Sylvester Stallone in Spy Kids 3-D: Game Over. In 2005, Powell had a small role as a paperboy in The Wendell Baker Story. Speaking about working on that project, Powell shared in 2026: "I remember getting the call to be in that movie and practicing in our cul-de-sac with my mom growing up throwing papers just over and over and over. Hundreds of rolled up papers. And the feeling of confidence when you step on set knowing that you are going to throw a paper better then anyone else... discipline is the key to my happiness... if I've invested in (the role) properly then I get to just turn off my head and enjoy the ride." In 2007, before his first year of college, Powell landed a role in The Great Debaters, directed by and starring Denzel Washington. Washington introduced him to agent Ed Limato, who encouraged Powell to move to Los Angeles. After moving to the city, Powell stayed with a friend of the family and he later described struggling during this period to get roles, including failed auditions for Friday Night Lights, Cowboys & Aliens, and The Longest Ride. However, he saw some success with small credits in television series, including Into the West, Jack & Bobby, CSI: Miami, NCIS, Without a Trace, Rizzoli & Isles and The Lying Game. He also had minor parts in The Dark Knight Rises and Stuck in Love. Powell stated that he auditioned multiple times for the role in The Dark Knight Rises and that Christopher Nolan taking a chance on him was a validation as "nothing was going on" in his life at the time.

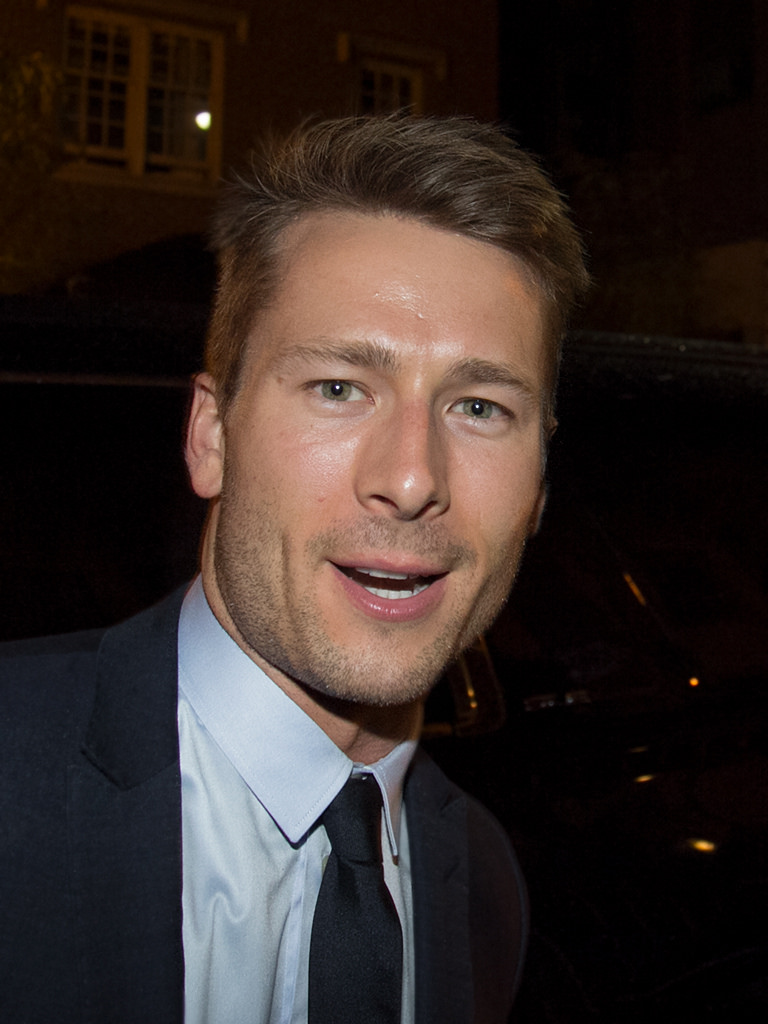
Powell at the 2016 Toronto International Film Festival

Powell began receiving larger roles in feature films around 2014. He played a hacker in The Expendables 3, an action movie that starred several well-known stars and that reunited Powell with Sylvester Stallone and Antonio Banderas. Powell later recounted asking Stallone for advice while filming on how to succeed in Hollywood. Powell next took minor roles in the comedies Sex Ed and Ride Along 2. During this period, he also had a main role in the first season of the television show Scream Queens and a recurring role in the second season.

In March 2016, he co-starred as Finnegan in Everybody Wants Some!!, Richard Linklater's spiritual sequel to Dazed & Confused, which was filmed in Austin, Texas and released by Paramount. The film was noted for being one of the first movies to really showcase Powell, with Linklater stating: "I needed someone with some charisma who was going to be smart, who was also believable as a college athlete... (He appeared) like this Beat character—he was even reading The Subterraneans, I think." Later that year, Powell played astronaut John Glenn in the biographical drama Hidden Figures. In 2017, he had a minor role as Sergeant Dylan Chutsky in the Netflix film Sand Castle. He then had a supporting role in The Guernsey Literary and Potato Peel Pie Society (2018).

=== 2018–present: Top Gun: Maverick and expansion ===
In 2018, Powell starred opposite Zoey Deutch in the romantic comedy Set It Up. The movie was released on Netflix. Powell reflected in an interview with The Hollywood Reporter that he started getting more calls from contacts in the film industry after the movie's release, and Jake Greenburg of The Guardian commented that it was the "first movie wise enough to let [Powell] take up real space". Later that year, Powell joined the cast of Top Gun: Maverick. He had initially auditioned for the role of Bradley "Rooster" Bradshaw, but the part went to Miles Teller. Powell's audition impressed producers, who offered him the role of Jake "Hangman" Seresin instead but Powell was reluctant to take the role because he viewed the character as underdeveloped. A call from Tom Cruise, the star of the film, convinced Powell to accept the part, with Cruise offering him greater control over the character. The film was delayed multiple times due to the COVID-19 pandemic, but it turned into a "breakout role" for Powell upon its release in May 2022.

Powell next worked as a voice actor in the animated film Apollo 10 1/2: A Space Age Childhood, which premiered in March 2022 in his second collaboration with Linklater. He then played naval officer Tom Hudner in the biographical war film, Devotion. The film, which Powell executive produced, received positive reviews when released in November 2022, but it was a box-office bomb.

In 2023, he co-starred opposite Sydney Sweeney in the romantic comedy Anyone but You, which emerged as a sleeper hit, grossing $220 million worldwide. Around its release in December 2023, the film generated buzz because of speculation about a potential off-screen romance between Powell and Sweeney, although the two stars later admitted that the appearance of a real-life relationship was part of a marketing strategy. Powell remarked to The New York Times: "That's people wanting what's on the screen off the screen and sometimes you just have to lean into it a bit". He later indicated that the press tour was designed as "its own sense of entertainment". The film's success propelled Powell's career to stardom with Scott Mendelson writing: "It's a lower-budgeted, adult-skewing rom-com that relishes – rather than represses their star charisma and sex appeal ... It's a star vehicle harkening back to when thespians, not IP or marquee characters, were franchises." In the immediate aftermath, Powell was offered and signed on for a slew of star-vehicles including Chad Powers, The Running Man, How To Make A Killing, The Great Beyond, and The Comeback King; while also turning down projects like Jurassic World: Rebirth with Powell reasoning: "I'm not doing that movie because I read the script and I immediately was like, my presence in this movie doesn't help it ... It's about choosing where you're going to make an audience happy and where you're going to make yourself happy."

In 2024, Powell produced and co-wrote the script of the romantic black comedy Hit Man with director Richard Linklater. Several critics praised Powell's performance in it as an undercover police contractor posing as a hitman. Alissa Wilkinson of The New York Times called it a "genuine star-clinching turn" for Powell, while Sophie Butcher of Empire wrote that he "announces himself as a movie star and a filmmaking force to be reckoned with". After premiering at the 2023 Venice International Film Festival, Hit Man was released on Netflix in June 2024. His performance in Hit Man earned him a nomination for the Golden Globe Award for Best Actor in a Motion Picture – Musical or Comedy. In the following month, he starred in the disaster film Twisters, a standalone sequel to the 1996 film Twister, playing a YouTube storm chaser. IndieWire's David Ehrlich commended him for "churning pure charisma" in his part. The film was a critical and box office success.

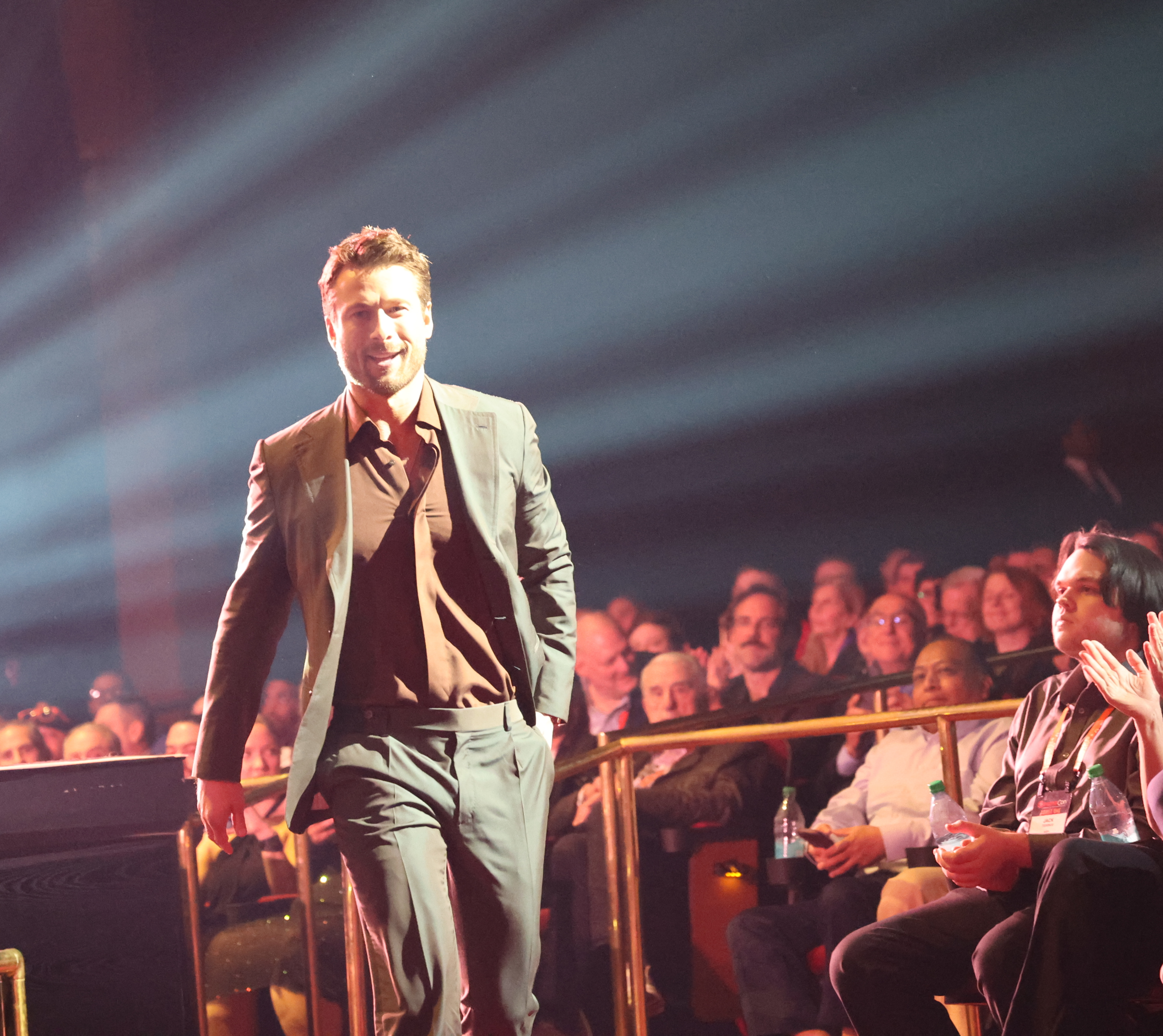
Powell at the 2025 CinemaCon

In 2025, Powell starred as Russ Holiday in the comedy series Chad Powers, which he helped to create and produce. The show follows Holiday's attempt to stage a comeback in football by disguising himself with a fake identity. Stuart Heritage of The Guardian called Powell's role one of the "most magnetic and magical performances in memory", while Daniel Fienberg of The Hollywood Reporter didn't care for the show but thought positively of Powell: "A major piece of this hypothetical renegade ethos is seeing how far Glen Powell's abundant natural charm can be pushed in having him play two characters who are completely unlikable in different ways? Both Russ and Chad are inconsistently written, but Powell is fully committed to all of their inconsistencies. The thing he's most consistent with is his general athleticism." The first season was successful, and was renewed for a second season. He then starred as the titular character in the remake of Stephen King's thriller novel The Running Man, directed by Edgar Wright and released in November 2025. The film received mixed reviews and bombed at the box office.

In 2026, Powell starred in the black comedy thriller How to Make a Killing. On Powell's performance, Owen Gleiberman of Variety, wrote: "He carries the audience with his energized sense of play. He's sleek enough to cruise through a movie like…well, Tom Cruise, and part of it is that he shares Cruise's projection of quick-fire intelligence. Powell, as Becket, is always thinking, deciding, calculating, and the actor lets that all show through." Powell also voiced Fox McCloud in The Super Mario Galaxy Movie. Glenn Garner of Deadline Hollywood wrote that Powell "shined" in the film adding that Powell, "provides a fun addition to the onscreen franchise as the voice of Fox McCloud, a furry animated manifestation of his own rising action star."

==== Upcoming ====
In 2027, he will co-star opposite Cristin Milioti in a romantic-comedy film The Comeback King directed by Judd Apatow about a country-western star in free-fall. Powell co-wrote and produces the film via his production company Barnstorm. Powell chose to drop out of Monsanto, which he was attached to star in, in order to make The Comeback King. He will then star in J. J. Abrams' fantasy film The Great Beyond opposite Jenna Ortega, Emma Mackey and Samuel L. Jackson.

== Barnstorm ==
In January 2025, Powell announced the formation of his production company, Barnstorm, with a film first-look deal at Universal Pictures, and Dan Cohen (of 21 Laps) as Powell's producing partner. March 2026, it was announced that Lionsgate acquired a crocodile feature film spec script entitled, The Death Roll, for Barnstorm to produce.

== Personal life ==
Powell is a licensed pilot. His Top Gun: Maverick co-star Tom Cruise paid for him to attend flight school.

Powell has declared himself to be a superfan of the Texas Longhorns. In 2024, he relocated from Los Angeles back to his hometown of Austin, Texas.

As of early 2026, Powell is dating actress/model Michelle Randolph.

== Filmography ==
Key
†	Denotes films that have not yet been released

=== Film ===
Year	Title	Role	Notes	Ref.
2003	Spy Kids 3-D: Game Over	Long-Fingered Boy		
2005	The Wendell Baker Story	Paper Boy Travis		
2006	Fast Food Nation	Steve		
2007	The Great Debaters	Preston Whittington		
2009	Jumping Off Bridges	Eric Turner		
2009	The Hottest State	John Jaegerman		
2012	J.A.W.	Aiden		
2012	The Dark Knight Rises	Trader #1		
2012	Stuck in Love	Good Looking Frat Guy		
2013	Best Friends Forever	Nick		
2013	Red Wing	Francis Riley		
2014	The Expendables 3	Thorn		
2014	Sex Ed	JT		
2015	Wind Walkers	Sonny Childe		
2016	Misconduct	Doug Fields		
2016	Ride Along 2	Troy		
2016	Everybody Wants Some!!	Walt "Finn" Finnegan		
2016	Hidden Figures	John Glenn		
2017	Sand Castle	Sergeant Dylan Chutsky		
2018	The Bad Guys	Whit		
2018	The Guernsey Literary and Potato Peel Pie Society	Mark Reynolds		
2018	Set It Up	Charlie Young		
2022	Apollo 10½: A Space Age Childhood	Bostick		
2022	Top Gun: Maverick	Lieutenant Jake "Hangman" Seresin		
2022	Devotion	Tom Hudner	Also executive producer	
2023	Hit Man	Gary Johnson	Also writer and producer	
2023	Anyone but You	Ben		
2024	The Blue Angels	Producer	Documentary film	
2024	Twisters	Tyler Owens		
2025	The Running Man	Ben Richards		
2026	How to Make a Killing	Becket Redfellow	Also executive producer	
2026	The Super Mario Galaxy Movie	Fox McCloud	Voice role	
2027	The Comeback King †	Aubrey King	Post-production; also co-writer and producer	
2027	The Great Beyond †	TBA	Post-production	

=== Television ===
Year	Title	Role	Notes	Ref.
2003	Endurance	Himself / Contestant	Episode: "Drop-Out"	
2004	Jack & Bobby	Rich Wolf	Episode: "Pilot"	
2005	Into the West	Jackson Wheeler	Episode: "Hell on Wheels"	
2008	Without a Trace	Brett Farnsworth	Episode: "True/False"	
2009	CSI: Miami	Logan Crawford	Episode: "Head Case"	
2011	Rizzoli & Isles	Graham Randall	Episode: "Remember Me"	
2012	The Lying Game	Gavin Turner	Episode: "No Country for Young Love"	
2012	NCIS	Evan Westcott	Episodes: "Shell Shock: Parts 1 & 2"	
2015–2016	Scream Queens	Chad Radwell	Main role (season 1), Recurring role (season 2); 16 episodes	
2017	All Hail King Julien	Trent	Voice role; 3 episodes	
2020–2022	Jurassic World Camp Cretaceous	Dave	Voice role; 14 episodes (seasons 1-2, 5)	
2020	Robot Chicken	Various	Voice role; Episode: "Ghandi Mulholland in: Plastic Doesn't Get Cancer"	
2023	Rick and Morty	Kwyatt	Voice role; Episode: "Wet Kuat Amortican Summer"	
2024	Family Guy	Patrick McCloskey	Voice role; Episode: "Peter, Peter, Pumpkin Cheater"	
2024–2025	Saturday Night Live	Himself / various	1 episode as host, 1 episode as guest	
2025–present	Chad Powers	Russ Holliday / Chad Powers	Main role; 12 episodes (also co-creator, writer and executive producer)	

=== Audio ===
Year	Title	Role	Notes	Ref.
2021	10 Days	Danny Miles	10 episodes	
2024	The Best Man's Ghostwriter	Nate	10 episodes	

== Awards and nominations ==
Year	Award	Category	Work	Result	Ref.
2017	Screen Actors Guild Awards	Outstanding Performance by a Cast in a Motion Picture (Note: Shared with the cast of Hidden Figures.)	Hidden Figures	Won	
2017	Palm Springs International Film Festival	Ensemble Performance Award	Hidden Figures	Honored	
2023	Austin Film Critics Association	Special Honorary Award	Top Gun: Maverick / Apollo 10-1/2 / Devotion	Honored	
2023	Online Film & Television Association	Best Breakthrough Performance: Male	Top Gun: Maverick	Nominated	
2024	People's Choice Awards	The Comedy Movie Star of the Year	Anyone but You	Nominated	
2024	Astra Midseason Movie Awards	Best Actor	Hit Man	Won	
2024	Astra Midseason Movie Awards	Best Screenplay (Note: Shared with Richard Linklater.)	Hit Man	Runner-up	
2024	Astra Film Awards	Best Actor	Hit Man	Nominated	
2024	Astra Film Awards	Best Adapted Screenplay	Hit Man	Nominated	
2025	Golden Globe Awards	Best Actor in a Motion Picture – Musical or Comedy	Hit Man	Nominated	
2025	Satellite Awards	Best Actor in a Motion Picture – Comedy or Musical	Hit Man	Nominated	
2025	Writers Guild of America Awards	Best Adapted Screenplay	Hit Man	Nominated	
2025	CinemaCon	Star of the Year	—N/a	Honored	
2026	Golden Globe Awards	Best Actor in a Television Series – Musical or Comedy	Chad Powers	Nominated	
2026	Satellite Awards	Best Actor – Television Series Musical or Comedy	Chad Powers	Nominated	
