= List of awards and nominations received by Sean Penn =

Sean Penn awards and nominations
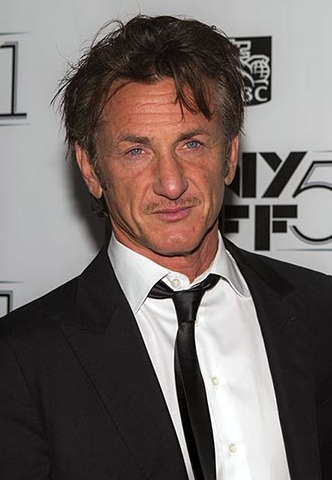
- Penn at the New York Film Festival in 2013
Awards and nominations
Award	Wins	Nominations
Academy Awards	3	6
Actor Awards	2	8
BAFTA Awards	1	4
Critics' Choice Awards	3	7
Emmy Awards	0	1
Golden Globes	1	6
Grammy Awards	0	1

Totals (Note: Certain award groups do not simply award one winner. They acknowledge several different recipients, have runners-up, and have third place. Since this is a specific recognition and is different from losing an award, runner-up mentions are considered wins in this award tally. For simplification and to avoid errors, each award in this list has been presumed to have had a prior nomination.)
- Wins: 17
- Nominations: 44

Sean Penn is an American actor, director and producer. He has earned acclaim for his intense broody roles in dramatic films. Over his career he has received numerous accolades including three Academy Awards, a BAFTA Award, three Critics' Choice Awards, a Golden Globe Award, and two Screen Actors Guild Awards as well as nominations for an Emmy Award and a Grammy Award. In 2015, he received an Honorary César.

Penn's early roles include the teen comedy Fast Times at Ridgemont High (1982), the crime drama Bad Boys (1983), and the war drama Casualties of War (1989). He earned the Venice International Film Festival's Volpi Cup for Best Actor for his role in Hurlyburly (1989). He played a sleazy lawyer in the Brian de Palma crime drama Carlito's Way (1993), which earned him a nomination for the Golden Globe Award for Best Supporting Actor – Motion Picture. He gained widespread acclaim for his portrayal of a killer on death row in the Tim Robbins crime drama Dead Man Walking (1995) earning him the Silver Bear for Best Actor as well as nominations for the Academy Award for Best Actor, the Golden Globe Award for Best Actor in a Motion Picture – Drama, and the Screen Actors Guild Award for Outstanding Actor in a Leading Role.

For his role in the Nick Cassavettes romantic drama She's So Lovely (1997) he won the Cannes Film Festival Award for Best Actor. He earned further Academy Award for Best Actor nominations for his performances as a jazz guitarist in Woody Allen's romance Sweet and Lowdown (1999), and a mentally challenged man in Jessie Nelson's drama I Am Sam (2001). He won his second Volpi Cup for Best Actor for his role in the Alejandro González Iñárritu crime thriller 21 Grams (2003). That same year, he played a grieving father in the Clint Eastwood drama Mystic River (2003) for which he won the Academy Awards for Best Actor and the Golden Globe Award for Best Actor in a Motion Picture – Drama as well as nominations for the BAFTA Award for Best Actor in a Leading Role and the Screen Actors Guild Award for Outstanding Actor in a Leading Role.

Penn directed the adventure drama Into the Wild (2007) for which he was nominated for the Critics' Choice Movie Award for Best Director and the Directors Guild of America Award for Outstanding Directing – Feature Film. The following year, he portrayed gay rights activist Harvey Milk in the Gus Van Sant political drama Milk (2008), for which he received his second Academy Award for Best Actor as well as the Critics' Choice Movie Award for Best Actor and Screen Actors Guild Award for Outstanding Actor in a Leading Role with nominations for the BAFTA Award for Best Actor in a Leading Role, the Golden Globe Award for Best Actor in a Motion Picture – Drama, and the Independent Spirit Award for Best Male Lead.

In 2026, Penn won the Academy Award for Best Supporting Actor and the BAFTA Award for Best Supporting Actor for his performance in One Battle After Another (2025), and also won the Actor Award for Outstanding Performance by a Male Actor in a Supporting Role.

== Major associations ==
=== Academy Awards ===
Year	Category	Nominated work	Result	Ref.
1996	Best Actor	Dead Man Walking	Nominated	
2000	Best Actor	Sweet and Lowdown	Nominated	
2002	Best Actor	I Am Sam	Nominated	
2004	Best Actor	Mystic River	Won	
2009	Best Actor	Milk	Won	
2026	Best Supporting Actor	One Battle After Another	Won	

=== Actor Awards ===
Year	Category	Nominated work	Result	Ref.
1996	Outstanding Male Actor in a Leading Role	Dead Man Walking	Nominated	
2002	Outstanding Male Actor in a Leading Role	I Am Sam	Nominated	
2004	Outstanding Cast in a Motion Picture	Mystic River	Nominated	
2004	Outstanding Male Actor in a Leading Role	Mystic River	Nominated	
2009	Outstanding Cast in a Motion Picture	Milk	Nominated	
2009	Outstanding Male Actor in a Leading Role	Milk	Won	
2026	Outstanding Cast in a Motion Picture	One Battle After Another	Nominated	
2026	Outstanding Male Actor in a Supporting Role	One Battle After Another	Won	

=== BAFTA Awards ===
Year	Category	Nominated work	Result	Ref.
2004	Best Actor in a Leading Role	Mystic River	Nominated	
2004	Best Actor in a Leading Role	21 Grams	Nominated	
2009	Best Actor in a Leading Role	Milk	Nominated	
2026	Best Actor in a Supporting Role	One Battle After Another	Won	

=== Critics' Choice Awards ===
Year	Category	Nominated work	Result	Ref.
Critics' Choice Movie Awards
2002	Best Actor	I Am Sam	Nominated	
2004	Best Actor	Mystic River	Won	
2008	Best Director	Into the Wild	Nominated	
2008	Best Writer	Into the Wild	Nominated	
2009	Best Actor	Milk	Won	
2009	Best Acting Ensemble	Milk	Won	
2026	Best Supporting Actor	One Battle After Another	Nominated	

=== Emmy Awards ===
Year	Category	Nominated work	Result	Ref.
News & Documentary Emmy Awards
2024	Outstanding Politics and Government Documentary	Superpower	Nominated	

=== Golden Globe Awards ===
Year	Category	Nominated work	Result	Ref.
1994	Best Supporting Actor – Motion Picture	Carlito's Way	Nominated	
1996	Best Actor in a Motion Picture – Drama	Dead Man Walking	Nominated	
2000	Best Actor in a Motion Picture – Musical or Comedy	Sweet and Lowdown	Nominated	
2004	Best Actor in a Motion Picture – Drama	Mystic River	Won	
2009	Best Actor in a Motion Picture – Drama	Milk	Nominated	
2026	Best Supporting Actor – Motion Picture	One Battle After Another	Nominated	

=== Grammy Awards ===
Year	Category	Nominated work	Result	Ref.
2006	Best Spoken Word Album	Bob Dylan: Chronicles	Nominated	

== Other awards and nominations ==
Organizations	Year	Category	Work	Result	Ref.
Berlin International Film Festival	1995	Silver Bear for Best Actor	Dead Man Walking	Won	
Berlin International Film Festival	2022	Berlinale Documentary Award	Superpower	Nominated	
Cannes Film Festival	1997	Best Actor	She's So Lovely	Won	
Cannes Film Festival	2001	Palme d'Or	The Pledge	Nominated	
Cannes Film Festival	2016	Palme d'Or	The Last Face	Nominated	
Cannes Film Festival	2021	Palme d'Or	Flag Day	Nominated	
César Awards	2003	Best European Union Film	September 11	Nominated	
César Awards	2009	Best Foreign Film	Into the Wild	Nominated	
César Awards	2015	Honorary César		Honored	
Directors Guild of America Awards	2007	Outstanding Directing – Feature Film	Into the Wild	Nominated	
Independent Spirit Awards	1995	Best Male Lead	Dead Man Walking	Won	
Independent Spirit Awards	1998	Best Male Lead	Hurlyburly	Nominated	
Independent Spirit Awards	2003	Special Distinction Award	21 Grams	Won	
Independent Spirit Awards	2008	Best Male Lead	Milk	Nominated	
Venice International Film Festival	1995	Golden Lion	The Crossing Guard	Nominated	
Venice International Film Festival	1998	Volpi Cup for Best Actor	Hurlyburly	Won	
Venice International Film Festival	2002	UNESCO Award	September 11	Won	
Venice International Film Festival	2003	Volpi Cup for Best Actor	21 Grams	Won	

== Honorary awards ==
Organizations	Year	Award	Result	Ref.
BAFTA\LA Britannia Award	2008	Stanley Kubrick Excellence in Film Award	Honored	
César Awards	2015	Honorary César	Honored	
Critics' Choice Awards	2011	Joel Siegel Award	Honored	
Hollywood Film Awards	2011	Humanitarian Award	Honored	
Producers Guild of America Award	2011	Stanley Kramer Award	Honored	
San Francisco International Film Festival	1999	Peter J. Owens Award	Honored	
San Sebastian International Film Festival	2003	Donostia Lifetime Achievement Award	Honored	
Television Academy	2022	Bob Hope Humanitarian Award	Honored	
Zurich Film Festival	2011	Golden Icon Award	Honored	

== See also ==
- Sean Penn filmography
