= Fernando Cerimedo =

Argentine publicist (born 1981)

- Born: May 1, 1981 (age 45); Mar del Plata, Argentina
- Occupations: Political consultant, publicist
- Known for: Political campaigning in Latin America

Fernando Gabriel Cerimedo (born 1 May 1981) is an Argentine political consultant and publicist. He is a co-founder of the right-wing digital outlet La Derecha Diario and has worked in political communication in several Latin American countries. He became particularly known for his involvement with supporters of former Brazilian president Jair Bolsonaro and Argentine president Javier Milei, and was involved in political campaigns for center-right to far-right political figures.

In 2024, Brazil's Federal Police included Cerimedo among 37 people named in its investigation into an alleged attempt to overturn the result of the 2022 Brazilian general election. He was not subsequently charged by the Prosecutor General's Office. In August 2026, Cerimedo was arrested in Bolivia following the shooting of his former partner, political analyst Nadia Beller. He was placed in pre-trial detention while prosecutors investigated allegations including attempted femicide and illicit enrichment. Cerimedo has denied involvement in the shooting.

== Career ==
Cerimedo was born in Mar del Plata, Argentina. He has stated that he studied law before moving to the United States and Puerto Rico and has made several claims about his education and early career, including studying at Harvard University and working in political campaigns in the United States. Investigations by Chequeado and Agência Pública reported that some of these claims could not be independently verified or were disputed by the institutions and individuals involved.

After returning to Argentina, Cerimedo worked in advertising, including at McCann. He later established Numen, a digital marketing and political communication company, and in 2018 helped establish La Derecha Diario. Cerimedo became involved in Brazilian politics through Eduardo Bolsonaro and has said that he participated in the final stages of Jair Bolsonaro's successful 2018 presidential campaign. He subsequently worked in digital political campaigning elsewhere in Latin America. During Argentina's 2023 presidential election, Cerimedo participated in the political communication operation surrounding Javier Milei's campaign. In Bolivia, he later advised Rodrigo Paz during or following the 2025 Bolivian general election. Paz's government subsequently described Cerimedo as a cooperating adviser who did not hold a formal government position or receive a state salary.

Cerimedo has also been linked in media reports to political campaigning surrounding Chile's constitutional referendums, the 2025 Honduran general election, and the 2026 Peruvian general election although the extent of his involvement in some of these campaigns has been disputed. Following Bolsonaro's defeat by Luiz Inácio Lula da Silva in the 2022 presidential election, Cerimedo promoted claims questioning the reliability of Brazil's electronic voting machines. In a livestream on 4 November 2022, he presented claims alleging irregularities between different models of voting machines. Brazilian electoral authorities and fact-checking organizations rejected the claims as false.

The Superior Electoral Court subsequently ordered the suspension of social-media accounts associated with La Derecha Diario Brasil. Cerimedo maintained that he had not explicitly claimed that electoral fraud had occurred and said that the issues he raised should be investigated. In November 2024, the Federal Police named Cerimedo among 37 people in its investigation into an alleged plot to prevent Lula from assuming office. He was the only foreign national among those named. The Prosecutor General's Office later declined to charge him, and he was therefore not tried before the Supreme Federal Court.

== Legal proceedings in Bolivia ==
On 18 August 2026, Bolivian police arrested Cerimedo at Viru Viru International Airport in connection with an armed attack on his former partner, Nadia Beller, who was hospitalized after being shot. Prosecutors accused Cerimedo of attempted femicide and domestic violence. He denied responsibility for the attack. On 21 August, a court ordered Cerimedo held in pre-trial detention for 180 days at Palmasola while the case was investigated. Bolivian prosecutors subsequently opened separate investigations concerning alleged illicit enrichment and alleged links to drug trafficking. As of August 2026, these proceedings remained ongoing and had not resulted in convictions.

== See also ==
- Arrest of Roger Mariaca
