= Sean Penn filmography =

Performances by American actor

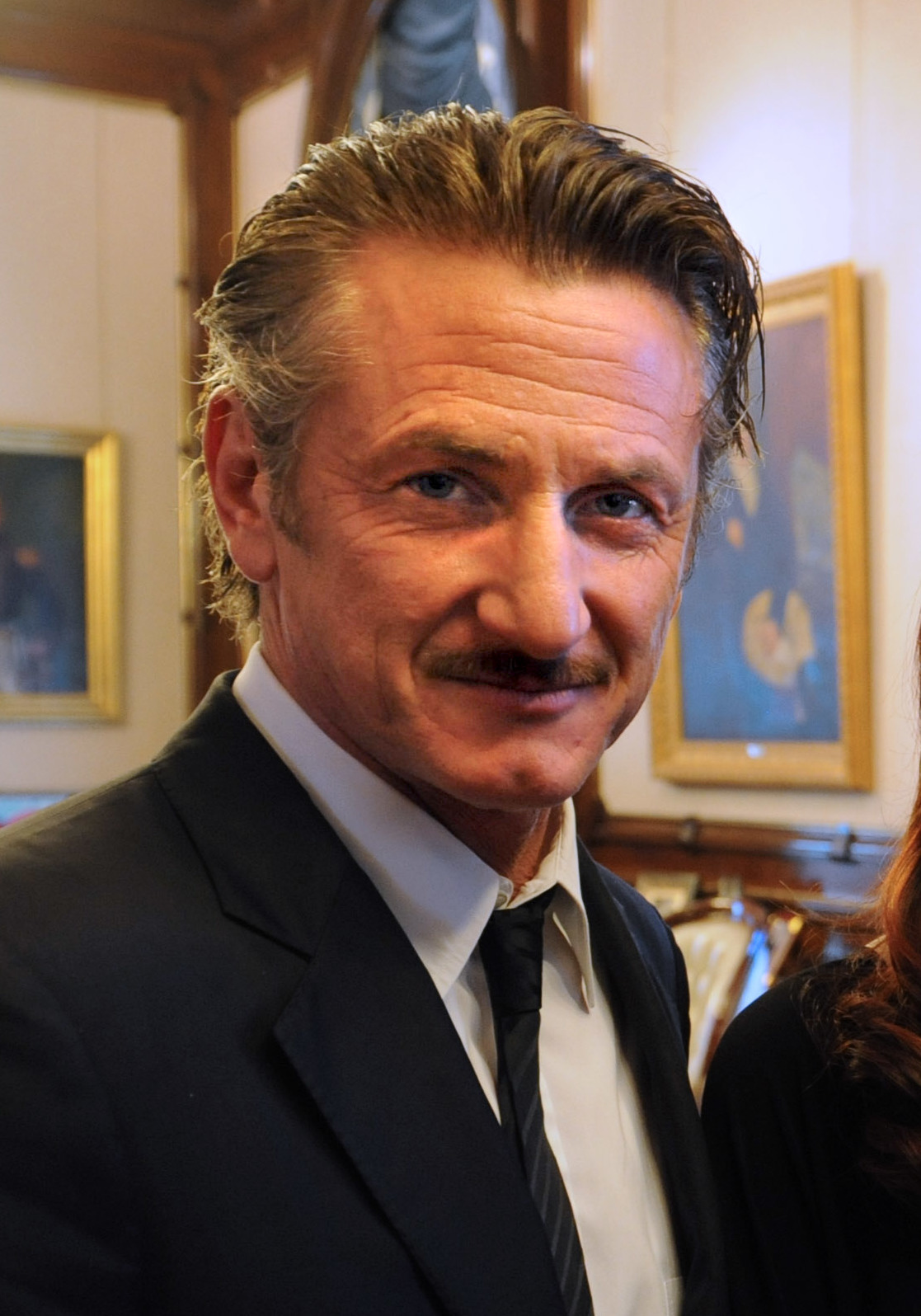
Sean Penn in 2012

The following is a complete list of the filmography of Sean Penn.

== Acting credits ==
=== Films ===
Year	Title	Role	Notes	Ref.
1981	Taps	Cadet Captain Alex Dwyer		
1982	The Beaver Kid 2	Larry "Groovin' Larry"	Short film	
1982	Fast Times at Ridgemont High	Jeff Spicoli		
1983	Bad Boys	Michael "Mick" O'Brien		
1983	Risky Business	Unknown	Uncredited cameo	
1983	Summerspell	Buddy		
1984	Crackers	Dillard		
1984	Racing with the Moon	Henry "Hopper" Nash		
1985	The Falcon and the Snowman	Andrew Daulton Lee		
1986	At Close Range	Brad Whitewood Jr.		
1986	Shanghai Surprise	Glendon Wasey		
1987	Dear America: Letters Home from Vietnam	Narrator	Documentary	
1988	Colors	Officer Danny "Pac-Man" McGavin		
1988	Judgment in Berlin	Guenther X		
1989	Casualties of War	Sergeant Tony Meserve		
1989	We're No Angels	Jim		
1990	State of Grace	Detective Terry Noonan		
1990	Cool Blue	Phil "The Plumber"	Uncredited	
1991	Schneeweißrosenrot	Himself	Documentary	
1992	Cruise Control	Jeffrey	Short film	
1993	Carlito's Way	David Kleinfeld		
1993	The Last Party	Himself	Documentary	
1995	Dead Man Walking	Matthew Poncelet		
1997	Loved	Michael	also producer	
1997	She's So Lovely	Eddie Quinn		
1997	U Turn	Bobby Cooper		
1997	The Game	Conrad Van Orton		
1997	Hugo Pool	Strange Hitchhiker		
1998	Hurlyburly	Eddie		
1998	The Thin Red Line	1st Sergeant Welsh		
1999	Being John Malkovich	Himself	Uncredited cameo	
1999	Sweet and Lowdown	Emmet Ray		
2000	Up at the Villa	Rowley Flint		
2000	Before Night Falls	Cuco Sánchez		
2000	The Weight of Water	Thomas Janes		
2000	A Constant Forge	Himself	Documentary	
2001	I Am Sam	Samuel John "Sam" Dawson		
2001	Dogtown and Z-Boys	Narrator	Documentary	
2001	See How They Run	Himself	Documentary	
2003	Pauly Shore Is Dead	Himself	Cameo	
2003	It's All About Love	Marciello		
2003	Mystic River	Jimmy Markum		
2003	21 Grams	Paul Rivers		
2004	The Assassination of Richard Nixon	Samuel J. Bicke		
2005	The Interpreter	Secret Service Agent Tobin Keller		
2006	All the King's Men	Willie Stark		
2007	Persepolis	Marjane's Father	Voice; English dub	
2007	War Made Easy	Narrator	Documentary	
2008	What Just Happened	Himself		
2008	Milk	Harvey Milk		
2008	Witch Hunt	Narrator	Documentary; also executive producer	
2009	The People Speak	Himself	Documentary	
2009	Crossing Over	Chris Farrell	Scenes deleted	
2010	I'm Still Here	Himself	Mockumentary	
2010	Fair Game	Joseph C. Wilson		
2011	The Tree of Life	Adult Jack		
2011	This Must Be the Place	Cheyenne		
2012	Americans	Commie	Short film	
2013	Gangster Squad	Mickey Cohen		
2013	The Secret Life of Walter Mitty	Sean O'Connell		
2015	The Gunman	Jim Terrier		
2016	The Angry Birds Movie	Terence	Voice	
2016	Sound of Sun	Man	Short film	
2019	The Professor and the Madman	William Chester Minor		
2021	Flag Day	John Vogel		
2021	Licorice Pizza	Jack Holden		
2023	Asphalt City	Gene Rutkovsky		
2023	Daddio	Clark		
2023	Gonzo Girl			
2025	Animals in War			
2025	One Battle After Another	Col. Steven J. Lockjaw		
TBA	Snake Island †		Upcoming Doug Liman film	

=== Television ===
Year	Title	Role	Notes	Ref.
1974	Little House on the Prairie	Kid	Episode: "The Voice of Tinker Jones"	
1979	Barnaby Jones	Sam	Episode: "School of Terror"	
1981	The Killing of Randy Webster	Don Fremont	Television film	
1987	Saturday Night Live	Himself (host)	Episode: "Sean Penn/LL Cool J"	
1997	Ellen	Himself	Uncredited; Episode: "Emma"	
1998	The Larry Sanders Show	Himself	Episode: "Flip"	
2001	Friends	Eric	2 episodes	
2003	MTV Icon	Himself	Episode: "Metallica"	
2004	Viva La Bam	Himself	Episode: "Fort Knoxville"	
2004	Two and a Half Men	Himself	Episode: "Back Off, Mary Poppins"	
2016	Family Guy	Himself (voice)	Episode: "Hot Shots"	
2018	The First	Tom Haggerty	8 episodes	
2020	Curb Your Enthusiasm	Himself	Episode: "The Spite Store"	
2022	Gaslit	John Mitchell	8 episodes	
2023	C*A*U*G*H*T	Himself	6 episodes	
2025	aka Charlie Sheen	Himself	Documentary	

=== Theatre ===
Year	Title	Role	Venue	Ref.
1981	Heartland	James	Century Theater, Broadway	
1983	Slab Boys	George "Spanky" Farrell	Playhouse Theatre, Broadway	
2000	The Late Henry Moss	Ray Moss	Magic Theatre, San Francisco	

=== Music videos ===
Year	Title	Artist	Role	Ref.
2014	"Run"	Jay-Z and Beyoncé	Himself (cameo)	
2023	"Use Me"	Diplo, Dove Cameron and Sturgill Simpson	Johnny Blue Skies	

== Directing credits ==
=== Film ===
Year	Title	Director	Writer	Producer	Notes
1991	The Indian Runner	Yes	Yes	No	
1995	The Crossing Guard	Yes	Yes	Yes	
2001	The Pledge	Yes	No	Yes	
2002	11'09"01 September 11	Yes	Yes	No	Segment: "United States of America"
2007	Into the Wild	Yes	Yes	Yes	
2012	Americans	No	Story	No	Short
2015	The Gunman	No	Yes	Yes	
2016	The Last Face	Yes	No	No	
2021	Flag Day	Yes	No	No	
2023	Superpower	Yes	No	Yes	Documentary
2023	Asphalt City	No	No	Yes	
TBA	The Gun on Second Street †	No	No	Executive	Filming

=== Music videos ===
Year	Song	Artist
1992	"North Dakota"	Lyle Lovett
1993	"Dance with the One That Brought You"	Shania Twain
1996	"You Were Meant for Me (Juan Patino Radio Mix)"	Jewel
2000	"Highway Patrolman"	Bruce Springsteen
2002	"The Barry Williams Show"	Peter Gabriel
2016	"I Forgive It All" (with Samuel Bayer)	Mudcrutch
