= Sibongile Mlambo =

Zimbabwean actress

- Born: Sibongile Mlambo; Zimbabwe
- Education: Southern Methodist University
- Occupations: Model; Actress
- Years active: 1997–present

Sibongile Mlambo is a Zimbabwean-South African actress known for starring in Netflix's Lost in Space, the Starz historical adventure television series Black Sails, and Power Book III: Raising Kanan. Her film credits include Honey 3 and The Last Face. She is also best known for her role as Tamora Monroe on the MTV television series Teen Wolf, as Donna on the Freeform television series Siren, and voicing Melusi in the Ubisoft multiplayer game Tom Clancy's Rainbow Six Siege.

== Early life and education ==
Mlambo has a twin brother who is a filmmaker and an older sister who is also an actress. She was born and raised in Zimbabwe and pursued her tertiary education in the United States. Mlambo has lived in Los Angeles, Texas, New York, Spain, and South Africa.

She studied French and Spanish at Southern Methodist University and has a dance background.

== Career ==
=== Modeling ===
Mlambo began modeling in her late teens, appearing in advertising campaigns for brands including Nivea across Africa. Her modeling career also took her to Europe. In 2007, she was named second princess in the Miss Zim-USA pageant.

=== Acting ===
Mlambo made an early screen appearance in the 1997 film Kini and Adams. She later appeared in television productions including Strike Back, Mad Dogs, and Homeland.

From 2014 to 2017, she portrayed Eme in the Starz historical adventure series Black Sails.

In 2016, she starred as one of the leads, Ishani in Honey 3:Dare to Dance alongside Cassie Ventura and Kenny Wormald from Footloose. She also appeared in the movie The Last Face as Assatu, and portrayed Chadwick Boseman's sister, Bianca, in the feature film Message From The King.

In 2017, Mlambo played Tamora Monroe in the sixth and final season of MTV's supernatural drama Teen Wolf. She subsequently portrayed Donna in Freeform's fantasy drama Siren and Angela Goddard in Netflix's science fiction series Lost in Space.

In 2021, Mlambo guest-starred in the "Painkiller" episode of Black Lightning as Maya Odell. She also guest starred as a younger version of Aissa Joachim, who is Dembe Zuma's love interest in flashback scenes on The Blacklist.

Her other television appearances include MacGyver, Lovecraft Country, and CW's Roswell, New Mexico from 2021 to 2022, where she played Anatsa.

In 2023, Mlambo appeared as Clara in the Netflix limited series Florida Man and guest-starred as a younger Aissa Joachim in the NBC crime drama The Blacklist.

In 2025-2026, she starred as Imani Okoye in Power Book III: Raising Kanan.

== Filmography ==
=== Film ===
Year	Title	Role	Notes
1997	Kini and Adams	Bongi	Drama
2012	Half Good Killer	Aida	Short film
2013	Felix	Dancer	as Sibo Mlambo
2015	Back to School Mom	Beth	
2015	Ladygrey	Estelle	
2015	While You Weren't Looking	Female student	
2016	Message From The King	Bianca	
2016	Detour	MGM Receptionist	
2016	Honey 3: Dare to Dance	Ishani	Direct-to-video
2016	The Last Face	Assatu	Adventure / Romance / War / Drama
2017	New Haven	Astou Niang Diallo	Short film
2017	Mbomvu	Woman in White	Short film
2018	Under the Silver Lake	Blonde Roommate	Psychological Thriller
2019	Shadow Wolves	Zora	
2019	Afrika is a Country	Blue Woman	Short film
TBA	Take Back the Night	The Reporter	Post-production

=== Television ===
Year	Title	Role	Notes
2009	America's Got Talent	Herself	Contestant
2012	Beaver Falls	Cheerleader	Episode: #2.4
2012	Strike Back	Hostess	Episode: "Vengeance, Part 3"
2013	Mad Dogs	Detective	Episode: #3.1
2014–2017	Black Sails	Eme	Recurring role; 10 episodes
2014	Homeland	Jackie Marr	Episode: "Shalwar Kameez"
2015	Jamillah and Aladdin	Washerwoman	as Sibo Mlambo
2017	Teen Wolf	Tamora Monroe	Recurring role; 9 episodes
2018–2020	Siren	Donna	Main role; Season 1 (10 episodes); Guest role; Seasons 2–3 (3 episodes)
2018–2019	Lost in Space	Angela Goddard	Recurring role (season 1); Main role (season 2)
2018	MacGyver	Nasha	Recurring role; 3 episodes
2019	Dark/Web	Amy	Main role; 8 episodes
2020	God Friended Me	Lulu	Episode: "The Princess and the Hacker"
2020	Lovecraft Country	Tamara	2 episodes
2021	Black Lightning	Maya Odell	Episode: "Painkiller"
2021–2022	Roswell, New Mexico	Anatsa	Recurring role; 10 episodes
2023	The Blacklist	Aissa Joachim	Episode: "Dr Michael Abani (no198)
2023	Florida Man	Clara	Recurring role

== Awards and nominations ==
Year	Award Ceremony	Prize	Result	Refs.
2016	Zimbabwe International Women's Awards	Actress of the Year	Nominated	
