= Honey 3: Dare to Dance =

- DVD cover
- Directed by: Bille Woodruff
- Written by: Catherine Cyran
- Produced by: Mike Elliott
- Starring: Cassie Ventura; Kenny Wormald; Dena Kaplan; Sibongile Mlambo; Bobby Lockwood; Clayton Evertson; Terry Sauls
- Cinematography: Michael Cleary
- Edited by: Eric Potter
- Music by: Mark Kilian
- Production companies: Capital Arts Entertainment; Marc Platt Productions; Universal 1440 Entertainment; Universal Pictures
- Distributed by: Universal Studios Home Entertainment
- Release date: September 6, 2016
- Running time: 97 minutes
- Country: United States
- Language: English

Honey 3: Dare to Dance is a 2016 American dance film directed by Bille Woodruff and starring Cassie Ventura and Kenny Wormald. It is the third installment in the Honey film series. The film was released on Netflix and DVD and Blu-ray on September 6, 2016. Filming for Honey 3 took place in Cape Town, South Africa.

The story revolves around a dancer named Melea Martin (Cassie Ventura), who wants to put on a contemporary hip hop dance production of Romeo and Juliet to honor her mother, with boyfriend Erik Wildwood (Kenny Wormald), but her dreams of presenting the play through her prestigious school are crushed when she's kicked out for failure to pay her tuition. Searching for a way to use her talents and inspire the community around her, she rents a failing theater in order to present the dance show, but conflicts between cast members threaten to bring the whole performance to a halt.

The film, which is the second sequel to 2003's Honey, has a tenuous link to its predecessors, with no recurring cast members, and the only canonical reference to the original film is that the main character Melea comes from Honey Daniels' dance studio. It was followed by another straight-to-video sequel Honey: Rise Up and Dance (2018).

== Plot ==
At a prestigious South African school, American dance student Melea Martin (Cassie Ventura) plans a thesis presentation based on a modern-day hip-hop adaptation of Romeo and Juliet with her love interest Erik Wildwood (Kenny Wormald) to honor her late mother's memory. However, Melea's dreams are dashed when she's unable to pay tuition and is forced to leave.

Determined to fulfill her destiny, she decides to rent a failing theater and persuade the community to support her artistic and unique vision, including childhood friend Nadine (Dena Kaplan) and classmate Laser (Bobby Lockwood). She meets a rival during a club dance battle, Ishani Mfeke (Sibo Mlambo), who is reeling from the loss of her brother and has a hardened exterior. However, when Malea asks her to choreograph the production together, the two form an unlikely partnership.

When adrenaline-filled rehearsals cause dance crew rivals and egos to get in the way, everything falls apart much like Shakespeare's Capulets and Montagues. Amid romantic love triangles and personal conflicts, Melea dares to dream and risks it all to put on a performance the Cape Town community won't forget.

== Cast ==
- Cassie Ventura as Melea Martin
- Kenny Wormald as Erik Wildwood
- Dena Kaplan as Nadine
- Sibongile Mlambo as Ishani Mfeke
- Bobby Lockwood as Laser
- Clayton Evertson as Taj Mfeka
- Terry Sauls as Taariq
- Ambrose Uren as Dajon Bell
- Stephen Jubber as Eduardo Diego
- Adrian Galley as Mr Sammy Wright
- Peter Butler as Uncle Simon
- Brandon Peterson as Mike
- Sivuyile Ngesi as DJ Zubair Khumalo
- Adam Cope as Christian (R&J Stage Hand)
- Ashlynn Cloete as Crystal
- Jason Meyer as Zam

== Production ==
On November 14, 2015, it was announced Sibo Mlambo had been cast with a lead role in Universal's sequel Honey 3, which would be set in South Africa, with a likely debut on DVD in the United States. Mlambo was set to play the character of Ishani, a "street-tough Cape Town local who never backs down from a fight – or a dance battle. [...] Still reeling from the loss of her brother, Ishani has a hardened exterior and doesn't take too kindly to an outsider named Malea." Bille Woodruff was returning to direct Honey 3 after directing the first two films.

Later that month, Cassie Ventura was revealed to be playing the starring role of Malea. The film was described "filled with performances, a romantic love triangle and cultural clashes", and confirmed to release in 2016 from Universal 1440 Entertainment, the original content production arm of Universal Pictures Home Entertainment. Filming through December 20, 2015, it was also set to star Kenny Wormald, Dena Kaplan, Clayton Evertson, Bobby Lockwood, Peter Butler and Adrian Galley, from a script penned by Catherine Cyran and film production by Mike Elliott. Woodruff talked about the film's concept saying the crew "consider[ed] people being more interested in dance in a mainstream way because of TV shows. Shooting in South Africa made sense with the idea of taking the franchise to a different place in the world and exploring the different dances", continuing, "[Exploring the] differences and similarities. Dance is a universal language. Plus there is a huge fan community in Cape Town which opened our eyes to a dance community throughout the world."

== Release ==
The film was made available for streaming on Netflix on September 6, 2016, and released on DVD and Blu-ray on the same day in the United States.

Special features

- Feature Commentary with Director Bille Woodruff
- Battle Dakota Club
- South African Backdrop
- Behind the Dance: The Making of Honey 3
- Extended Dance Sequences
- Deleted Scenes

== Music ==
A soundtrack album to the film was released on September 2, 2016, by Back Lot Music. It features songs from Major Lazer featuring Ariana Grande, Jason Derulo, Dawin, Vicetone, The Very Best, Incredible Bongo Band, Carly Rose, among others, and includes an original track by the lead actress Cassie. South African composer Mark Kilian, the film's original score creator, also contributed with six tracks.

Honey 3: Dare to Dance (Original Motion Picture Soundtrack)
No.	Title	Performer(s)	Length
1.	"End of Time"	Hopp and Nelson Beato	3:23
2.	"Joint (No Sleep)"	Cassie	2:53
3.	"Apache (Grandmaster Flash Remix)"	Incredible Bongo Band	7:29
4.	"Dessert"	Dawin	3:31
5.	"Tonight"	SAM B	1:44
6.	"Forever"	J-Five	3:40
7.	"All My Love (Remix)" (featuring Ariana Grande)	Major Lazer	3:49
8.	"Sweka"	The Very Best	4:09
9.	"Take Me Slow"	Carly Rose	3:29
10.	"Closer"	JMR	3:45
11.	"Sad Song"	Cindy Alma	3:54
12.	"Catch Me"	Vicetone	3:54
13.	"Want to Want Me"	Jason Derulo	3:27
14.	"Oceans"	Evrywhr and SAM B	3:02
15.	"Lahla"	Busiswa, DJ Buckz and Uhuru	3:20
16.	"Production in Jeopardy"	Mark Kilian	3:47
17.	"Taj Loves Ishani"	Mark Kilian	1:51
18.	"Change the Ending"	Mark Kilian	1:04
19.	"It's Showtime"	Mark Kilian	1:40
20.	"A Charitable Gesture"	Mark Kilian	2:02
21.	"Honey 3: Dare to Dance Suite"	Mark Kilian	2:14
Total length:			1:08:07

== Home video reception ==
Honey 3: Dare to Dance earned $234,546 from domestic DVD sales and $36,226 from Blu-ray sales, bringing its total earnings from domestic home video sales to $270,772.
