= The Cloth =

2013 film

- Directed by: Justin Price
- Written by: Justin Price
- Based on: The Cloth by Justin Price
- Starring: Danny Trejo; Eric Roberts; Rachele Brooke Smith
- Cinematography: Khu, Justin Price
- Music by: Bart Samolis
- Production companies: Eminence Productions, Cloth Film
- Distributed by: Uncork'd Entertainment
- Release date: July 3, 2013
- Running time: 90 minutes
- Country: United States
- Language: English

The Cloth is a 2013 American horror/thriller film that was written and directed by Justin Price, who based it upon his book of the same title. The film stars Danny Trejo, Eric Roberts, Rachele Brooke Smith, Kyler Williett, and Steven Brand. Filming took place in 2011 and was in post production as of early 2012.

The Cloth was released directly to video on July 2.

== Plot ==
"The Cloth" of the title, on which the story centers, is a secret organization which the Roman Catholic Church forms to counteract the rising number of cases of demonic possessions across the country. The story follows a young man (Kyler Willett) who, though he is godless, is recruited into The Cloth to prepare a new generation with the tools needed to stop the rise of Beezlebub, the ultimate evil. The Cloth has found, much to the dismay of its members, that devout believers lack the capability for providing such tools, and thus that it needs an agent who refuses to believe in a god or gods to provide it with them.

== Cast ==
- Kyler Willett as Jason
- Danny Trejo as Father Connely
- Eric Roberts as Father Tollman
- Rachele Brooke Smith as Julia
- Justin Price as Kasdeya
- Robert Miano as Lewis
- Lassiter Holmes as Father Diekmen
- Cameron White as Helix
- Steven Brand as Father Johnson
- Perla Rodríguez as Laurel

== Reception ==
HorrorNews.net gave a mostly negative review for The Cloth, writing: " Definitely had some impressive visuals and a good script but are undermined by weak acting and an unoriginal story in this lively but unsatisfying tale of priests and demons."
