= Rachele Brooke Smith =

American actress and dancer (born 1987)

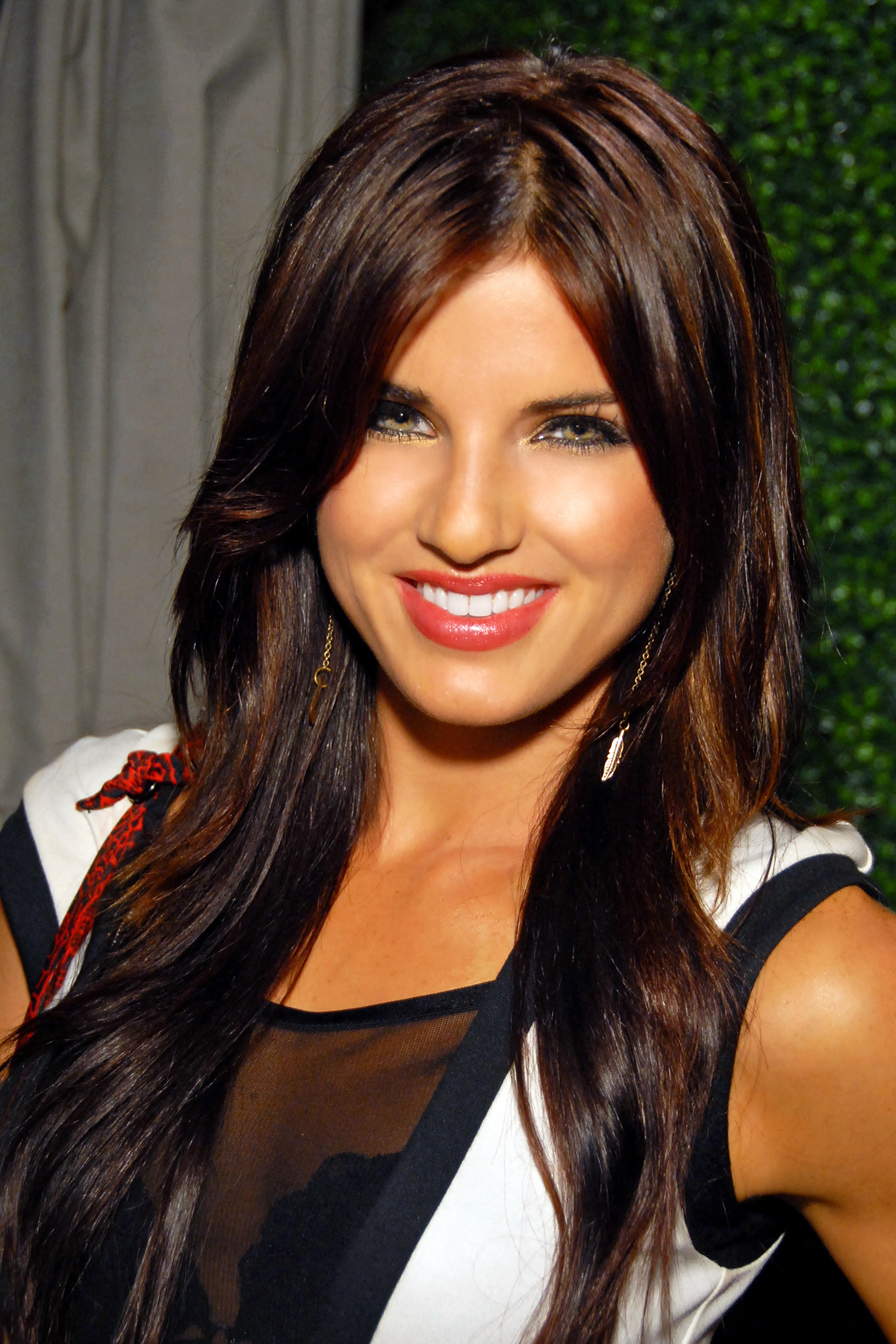
- Smith in 2011
- Born: November 7, 1987 (age 38); Arizona, United States
- Occupations: Actress, dancer
- Years active: 2008–present

Rachele Brooke Smith (born November 7, 1987) is an American actress and dancer. She has starred in several films including Center Stage: Turn It Up, Bring It On: Fight to the Finish, Atomic Shark, and Legend of the White Dragon.

== Personal life ==
Rachele Brooke Smith is an American actress, dancer, producer and motivational speaker, best known for combining her strong dance background with her work in film and television. She made her acting breakthrough as Kate Parker in Center Stage: Turn It Up (2008), a particularly meaningful role because the original Center Stage had inspired her to pursue acting and dance. She went on to star as Avery Whitbourne in Bring It On: Fight to the Finish and has appeared in films including Burlesque, 17 Again, Iron Man 2, The Nice Guys, Cold Moon and Atomic Shark, as well as television shows such as Glee, Scream Queens, How I Met Your Mother and Two and a Half Men. Beyond acting, Smith has also worked as a producer and inspirational speaker, with much of her work focusing on resilience, confidence and personal growth. Smith was married to Emilio Palafox on June 25, 2022.

== Filmography ==
=== Film ===
Year	Title	Role	Notes
2008	Center Stage: Turn It Up	Kate Parker	
2009	Attack at Zombie High!	Amber	Short film
2009	Fired Up!	Tiger Dancer	
2009	17 Again	Hammer Dancer	
2009	Bring It On: Fight to the Finish	Avery Whitbourne	Direct-to-video
2009	Alvin and the Chipmunks: The Squeakquel	Chipette Dancer	
2010	Iron Man 2	Ironette Dancer	
2010	Burlesque	Dancer	
2012	Beach Bar: The Movie	Sara West	
2013	Pop Star	Sienna Montez	
2013	The Cloth	Julia	
2014	A Place in the Heart	Sharon Donahue	Originally titled A Matter of Time
2016	Help! My Gumshoe's an Idiot	Krista	
2016	The Nice Guys	Party Girl #1	
2016	Altered Reality	Aja	
2016	Chalk It Up	Angelina	
2016	Cold Moon	Belinda Hale	
2019	Psycho Stripper	Taryn Belle	
2019	My Sister's Deadly Secret	Jill	
2020	The Last Exorcist	Jo	
2022	Alien Country	Melanie	
2022	Dangerous Methods	Lacy Johnson	
2022	Space Wars: Quest for the Deepstar	Nina	
2026	Legend of the White Dragon	Iris Maine	

=== Television ===
Year	Title	Role	Notes
2010	Glee	Dancer	Episode: "Britney/Brittany"
2010	How I Met Your Mother	Lady in Red	Episode: "Blitzgiving"
2011	Entourage	Vince's Ex	Episode: "Second to Last"
2012	Trend This!	Guest	Episode: "The Makeover"
2013	Anger Management	Chelsea	Episode: "Charlie and Lacey Shack Up"
2015	Scream Queens	Muffy St. Pierre-Radwell	Episode: "Thanksgiving"
2016	Center Stage: On Pointe	Kate Parker	Television film
2016	Atomic Shark	Gina Delamo	Television film
2017	Wisdom of the Crowd	Nicole	Episode: "Clear History"
2018	Nightmare Shark	Gina Delamo	Television film

=== Web ===
Year	Title	Role	Notes
2011	Talent	Waitress	Episode: "A Brand New Harper"
2014	Project: Phoenix	Britt	4 episodes

=== Music videos ===
Year	Title	Artist
2013	"Salud" (featuring Reek Rude, Sensato and Wilmer Valderrama)	Sky Blu
