= Sean Penn =

American actor and filmmaker (born 1960)

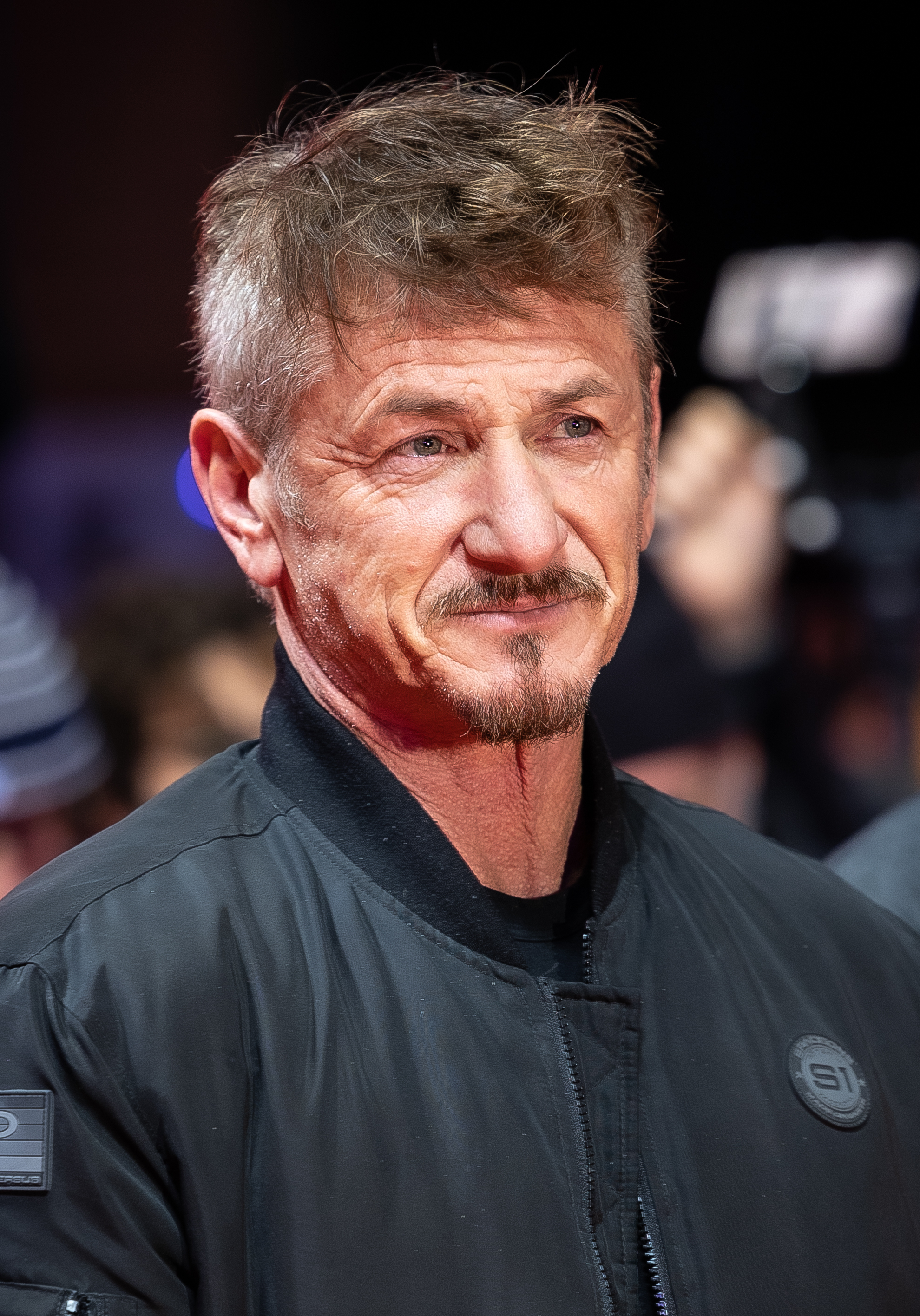
- Penn in 2023
- Born: Sean Justin Penn; August 17, 1960 (age 66); Santa Monica, California, U.S.
- Occupations: Actor; film director; producer; screenwriter
- Years active: 1974–present
- Works: Full list
- Spouses: Madonna (m. 1985; div. 1989) Robin Wright (m. 1996; div. 2010) Leila George (m. 2020; div. 2022)
- Children: Dylan Penn; Hopper Penn
- Parents: Leo Penn; Eileen Ryan
- Relatives: Chris Penn (brother); Michael Penn (brother)
- Awards: Full list

Sean Justin Penn (born August 17, 1960) is an American actor and filmmaker. He is known for his intense leading man roles in film. His accolades include three Academy Awards, a BAFTA Award, and a Golden Globe Award, in addition to nominations for an Emmy Award and a Grammy Award. He received the Honorary César in 2015 and the Bob Hope Humanitarian Award in 2022.

Penn made his feature film debut in the drama Taps (1981), before taking roles in Fast Times at Ridgemont High (1982), Bad Boys (1983), and At Close Range (1986). He has won three Academy Awards, Best Actor twice for playing a grieving father in Mystic River (2003) and the gay rights activist Harvey Milk in Milk (2008), and Best Supporting Actor for playing corrupt military officer Steven J. Lockjaw in One Battle After Another (2025). He was also Oscar-nominated for Dead Man Walking (1995), Sweet and Lowdown (1999), and I Am Sam (2001). He also acted in Casualties of War (1989), State of Grace (1990), Carlito's Way (1993), The Game (1997), The Thin Red Line (1998), Hurlyburly (1998), 21 Grams (2003), Fair Game (2010), The Tree of Life (2011), Licorice Pizza (2021), and Daddio (2023).

Penn made his directorial film debut with the crime drama The Indian Runner (1991), followed by The Crossing Guard (1995), The Pledge (2001), and Into the Wild (2007). On stage, he acted in the Broadway plays Heartland (1981) and Slab Boys (1983). On television, he portrayed an astronaut in the Hulu drama series The First (2018) and John N. Mitchell in the Starz political thriller miniseries Gaslit (2022).

Penn has also engaged in political and social activism, including his criticism of the George W. Bush administration, his contact with the presidents of Cuba and Venezuela, his humanitarian work in the aftermath of Hurricane Katrina in 2005 and the 2010 Haiti earthquake, and his support for Ukraine president Volodymyr Zelenskyy amidst the Russian-Ukrainian war.

== Early life ==
Sean Justin Penn was born on August 17, 1960, in Santa Monica, California, to actor and director Leo Penn and actress Eileen Ryan (née Annucci). His older brother is musician Michael Penn. His younger brother, actor Chris Penn, died in 2006. His father was Jewish, the son of emigrants from Merkinė in Lithuania, and his mother was a Catholic of Irish and Italian descent.

Penn was raised in a secular home in Malibu, California, and attended Malibu Park Junior High School and Santa Monica High School. He began making short films with some of his childhood friends including actors Emilio Estevez and Charlie Sheen, who lived near his home.

== Career ==
=== 1974–1989: Early work and breakthrough ===
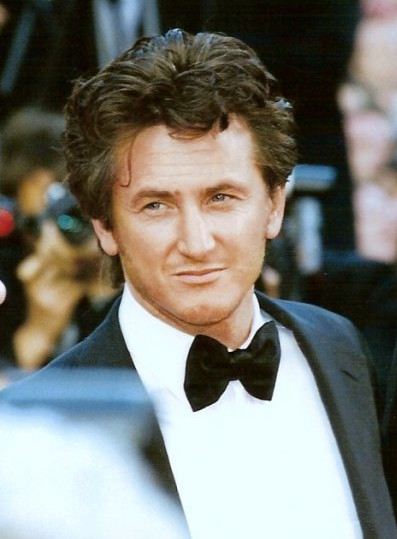
Penn at the 1997 Cannes Film Festival

Penn appeared in a 1974 episode of the Little House on the Prairie television series as an extra when his father, Leo, directed some of the episodes. Penn launched his film career with the action-drama Taps (1981), where he played a military high school cadet. That same year he made his Broadway debut in the Kevin Heelan play Heartland at the Century Theatre. A year later, he appeared in the hit comedy Fast Times at Ridgemont High (1982), in the role of surfer-stoner Jeff Spicoli; his character helped popularize the word "dude" in popular culture. Next, Penn appeared as Mick O'Brien, a troubled youth, in the drama Bad Boys (1983). The role earned Penn favorable reviews and jump-started his career as a serious actor. He returned to Broadway that same year acting in the John Byrne play Slab Boys acting alongside Kevin Bacon, Val Kilmer, Jackie Earl Haley, and Madeleine Potter at the Playhouse Theatre.

Penn played Andrew Daulton Lee in the film The Falcon and the Snowman (1985), which closely followed an actual criminal case. Lee was a former drug dealer, convicted of espionage for the Soviet Union and originally sentenced to life in prison, but was paroled in 1998. Penn later hired Lee as his personal assistant, partly because he wanted to reward Lee for allowing him to play Lee in the film; Penn was also a firm believer in rehabilitation and thought Lee should be successfully reintegrated into society, since he was a free man again. Penn starred in the drama At Close Range (1986) which received critical acclaim. He stopped acting for a few years in the early 1990s, having been dissatisfied with the industry, and focused on making his directing debut.

=== 1990–1999: Leading man roles and stardom ===
In 1990, Penn portrayed Detective Terry Noonan in the neo-noir State of Grace opposite Ed Harris and Gary Oldman. The following year, Penn made his directorial debut with The Indian Runner (1991), a crime drama film based on Bruce Springsteen's song "Highway Patrolman", from the 1982 album Nebraska. Janet Maslin of The New York Times wrote, "Flirting constantly with the dangers of pure self-indulgence, Mr. Penn still manages to keep the improvisatory quality of this painful family drama from becoming overwhelming. For all its hazy excesses, the film seldom loses sight of its story's raw essence." He also directed music videos, such as Shania Twain's "Dance with the One That Brought You" (1993), Lyle Lovett's "North Dakota" (1993). After a brief hiatus from acting, he returned to star in the Brian De Palma crime drama Carlito's Way (1993) acting opposite Al Pacino. Film critic Leonard Klady of Variety wrote of his performance, "Penn reminds viewers of what they've been missing in his performance as Carlito's ambitious, amoral lawyer. Without stooping to caricature, he effortlessly captures what is most heinous in the profession." Penn was nominated for the Golden Globe Award for Best Supporting Actor – Motion Picture.

He also directed the indie thriller The Crossing Guard (1995) starring Jack Nicholson. Janet Maslin of The New York Times wrote, "Penn is a slugger of a film maker, whether pummeling his audience with the obvious or hammering home the heartfelt and true. His second feature...has the same brute force that made his Indian Runner such a gripping oddity, bearing the distinctive stamp of Mr. Penn's raw, searching style". That same year he acting alongside Susan Sarandon starring in the Tim Robbins directed crime drama playing a racist murderer on death row in Dead Man Walking (1995). Critic Roger Ebert wrote "Penn proves again that he is the most powerful actor of his generation". For his performance he received a nomination for the Academy Award for Best Actor.

The following year he acted in the Nick Cassavetes-directed romantic drama She's So Lovely (1997) opposite his then-wife Robin Wright Penn. Lisa Schwarzbaum of Entertainment Weekly compared the film to the works of John Cassavetes and wrote that Penn's performance "is so full of heart and talent". Penn won the Cannes Film Festival Award for Best Actor. That same year he acted in the Oliver Stone directed neo-noir crime drama U Turn, and David Fincher's mystery thriller The Game.

In 1997, he starred in the independent drama Hurlyburly based on the 1984 play of the same name by David Rabe. Peter Bradshaw of The Guardian wrote, "Sean Penn ends up dominating the film, sweating anxiety and rage from every pore. His charisma and screen presence are undeniable". For his performance he won the Volpi Cup for Best Actor at the Venice International Film Festival. That same year he had a leading role in the Terrence Malick epic about the World War II battle for Guadalcanal in The Thin Red Line (1998) based on the 1962 novel of the same name by James Jones. The following year he portrayed an egotisitcal jazz guitarist in the Woody Allen film Sweet and Lowdown (1999). Roger Ebert described Penn's performances as "master classes in the art of character development". For his performance he was nominated for his second Academy Award for Best Actor.

=== 2000–2011: Established actor and acclaim ===
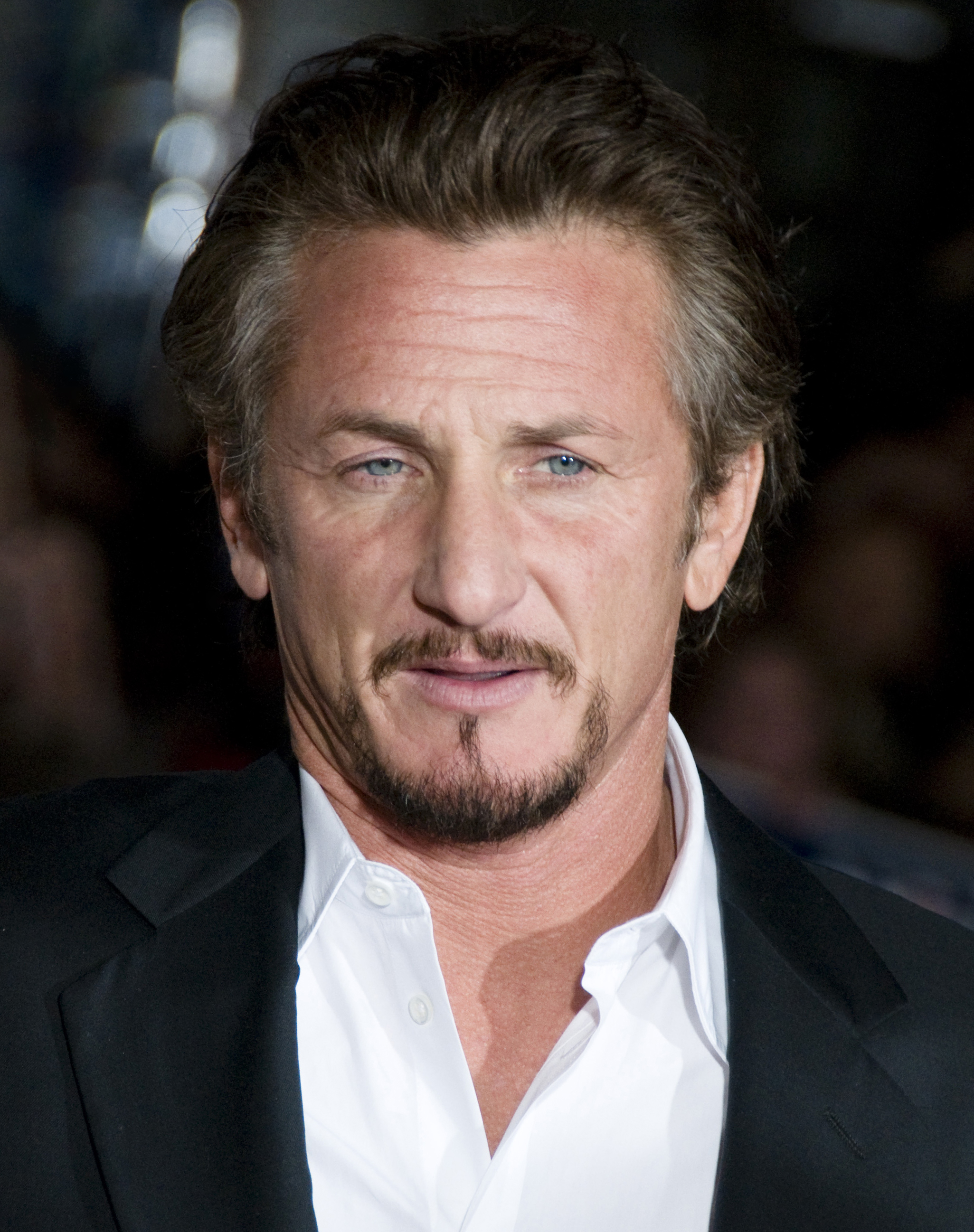
Penn in 2008

In 2000, Penn acted in Julian Schnabel's drama Before Night Falls opposite Javier Bardem and Kathryn Bigelow's thriller The Weight of Water with Elizabeth Hurley. The following year he guest starred on the NBC sitcom Friends portraying Eric, a man who was engaged to Phoebe Buffay's sister Ursula, both of whom are played by Lisa Kudrow. He appeared in two episodes in the eighth season. That same year he portrayed a mentally handicapped father in the family drama I am Sam (2001). His performance led him to his third nomination for the Academy Award for Best Actor.

In 2003, he starred in the Clint Eastwood directed Boston crime drama Mystic River portraying a grieving father looking for his daughter. Penn acted alongside Tim Robbins, Laura Linney, Marcia Gay Harden, and Kevin Bacon. Film critic Todd McCarthy of Variety wrote, "[The] Casting is immaculate. Penn is in top form as the reformed hood whose basic instincts overtake him." Penn received widespread acclaim for his performance earning numerous accolades including the Academy Award, Critics' Choice Movie Award, and Golden Globe Award for Best Actor as well as nominations for the BAFTA Award and Screen Actors Guild Award. That same year he acted in Alejandro González Iñárritu's psychological thriller 21 Grams opposite Naomi Watts and Benicio del Toro. For his performance he was nominated for the BAFTA Award for Best Actor at the 57th British Academy Film Awards.

In 2004, Penn played Samuel Bicke, a character based on Samuel Byck, who in 1974 attempted and failed to assassinate President Richard Nixon, in The Assassination of Richard Nixon (2004). The same year, he was invited to join the Academy of Motion Picture Arts and Sciences. Next, Penn portrayed governor Willie Stark (based on Huey Long) in All the King's Men (2006), an adaptation of Robert Penn Warren's 1946 novel. The film was a critical and commercial failure, named by a 2010 Forbes article as the biggest flop in the last five years. During this time he directed the mystery film The Pledge (2001) and Peter Gabriel's "The Barry Williams Show" (2002). Penn gained acclaim for directing the biographical drama survival film Into the Wild (2007). Owen Gleiberman of Entertainment Weekly praised wrote, "Penn has written and directed with magnificent precision and imaginative grace". For his direction he was nominated for the Directors Guild of America Award for Outstanding Directing – Feature Film.

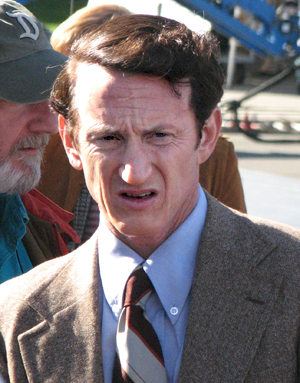
Penn portraying Harvey Milk during filming of Milk in March 2008

In November 2008, Penn earned positive reviews for his portrayal of real-life politician and gay rights activist and icon Harvey Milk in the Gus Van Sant directed biographical drama film Milk (2008). Kirk Honeycutt for The Hollywood Reporter wrote, "Penn is one of those actors in complete control of his entire instrument. He uses voice, body movements, line readings and something indefinable within his own psyche to transmigrate into another person's body and mind". For his performance he was nominated for Best Actor by the British Academy Film Awards, the Golden Globe Awards, and the Independent Spirit Awards. Penn won his second Academy Award for Best Actor and the Screen Actors Guild Award for Outstanding Performance by a Male Actor in a Leading Role.

In Fair Game (2010), Penn starred as Joseph C. Wilson, whose wife, Valerie Plame (Naomi Watts), was outed as a CIA agent by Bush advisor Scooter Libby in retaliation for an article Wilson wrote debunking Bush's claim that Iraq was building a nuclear bomb as a rationale for invading the country. The film is based upon Plame's 2007 memoir Fair Game: My Life as a Spy, My Betrayal by the White House. Penn reunited with Terrence Malick drama The Tree of Life (2011), which won the Palme d'Or at the 2011 Cannes Film Festival. That same year he starred in the Paolo Sorrentino directed comedy-drama This Must Be the Place (2011) opposite Frances McDormand. In the film Penn plays Cheyenne, a former rock star. The film received positive reviews with Todd McCarthy of The Hollywood Reporter wrote that "Penn dominates the film, of course, although it's a performance that slithers between the genuine and the stunt-like".

=== 2012–present: Focus on directing and television roles ===
In 2015, Penn starred in The Gunman, a French-American action thriller based on the novel The Prone Gunman, by Jean-Patrick Manchette. Jasmine Trinca, Idris Elba, Ray Winstone, Mark Rylance, and fellow Oscar-winner Javier Bardem appear in supporting roles. In The Gunman, Penn played Jim Terrier, a sniper on a mercenary assassination team who kills the minister of mines of the Congo. During this time Penn directed the drama film The Last Face (2016) starring Charlize Theron and Javier Bardem and the crime/drama film Flag Day (2021) with Dylan Penn and Josh Brolin. In March 2018, Atria Books published Penn's novel Bob Honey Who Just Do Stuff. After the book's release, Penn went on a highly publicized press tour. He claimed that he no longer had "a generic interest in making films", and being a writer will "dominate my creative energies for the foreseeable future".

In 2018 Penn starred in his first leading role in a television series portraying Tom Hagerty, an astronaut chosen to be one of the first people to visit Mars in the Hulu science fiction drama series The First created by Beau Willimon. Daniel Fienberg of The Hollywood Reporter wrote of his performance, "You can quickly see why Penn gravitated toward this as his series debut. His physical transformation and high-intensity confrontations...are showy, but the slowly unfolding role also lets him play quiet moments, and even light ones" adding, "It's funny that I'm always surprised by how game Penn is to be a goofball. The guy who starred in Fast Times at Ridgemont High is still in there somewhere." The series received positive reviews but on January 18, 2019, Hulu canceled the series after one season. In 2020 Penn played himself in a cameo role in the Curb Your Enthusiasm season 10 episode "The Spite Store".

In 2021, Penn portrayed Jack Holden, an actor based on William Holden, in the Paul Thomas Anderson directed coming of age comedy-drama Licorice Pizza. Penn returned to television starring in the Starz political thriller limited series Gaslit (2022) portraying John N. Mitchell opposite Julia Roberts as Martha Mitchell. The role required transformational prosthetics. Ben Travers of IndieWire wrote of his performance, "Penn manages to bring life to his makeup-constructed character" adding "Even his manner of speech, spitting curse words while clenching his wooden pipe, befits the boil of a man that John Mitchell becomes". For his performance he was nominated for the Hollywood Critics Association Award for Best Actor in a Limited or Anthology Series.

In 2023 Penn directed his first documentary film, Superpower, profiling the president of Ukraine Volodymyr Zelenskyy which premiered at the Berlin International Film Festival. The film follows Penn as he travels to Ukraine to meet with Zelenskyy, the soldiers and observe firsthand how the Russo-Ukrainian war is being waged. Penn starred as a cab driver in Christy Hall's directorial debut Daddio (2023) acting opposite Dakota Johnson. Film critic Todd McCarthy of Deadline Hollywood wrote, "Sean Penn is at his absolute best here in a tremendously engaging performance as a salty working-class guy with an endless supply of opinions and ways of drawing out his passengers".

In 2025, he appeared on the Netflix late-night talk show Everybody's Live with John Mulaney alongside Adam Sandler. Penn and Sandler give Mulaney advice for the physical fight he would later have with three 14-year olds on the show. The same year, he reunited with Paul Thomas Anderson, starring in his film One Battle After Another as the main antagonist and won a British Academy Film Award, an Actor Award and an Academy Award, while also receiving nominations for a Golden Globe and a Critics’ Choice for his performance. Penn also appeared in the Ukrainian anthology film War Through the Eyes of Animals, portraying a sound producer at the start of the 2022 Russian invasion of Ukraine in the act "The Eagle"; he offered to be in the movie for just $1 since the Screen Actors Guild forbids its members from working for free.

== Personal life ==
=== Marriages and relationships ===
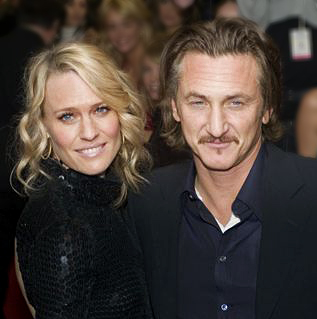
Penn with then-wife Robin Wright in September 2006; the two were married from 1996 to 2010.

Penn was engaged to actress Elizabeth McGovern, his co-star in Racing with the Moon (1984). He also dated Demi Moore and Susan Sarandon.

Penn met singer-songwriter Madonna on set of her "Material Girl" music video in January 1985. On August 16, 1985, they married on Madonna's 27th birthday; Penn turned 25 the next day. The two starred in the panned Shanghai Surprise (1986), directed by Jim Goddard, and Madonna dedicated her third studio album True Blue (1986) to Penn, referring to him in the liner notes as "the coolest guy in the universe". Their marriage was marred by Penn's violent outbursts against the press. Madonna filed for divorce in December 1987, but withdrew the papers two weeks later. In January 1989, Madonna filed for divorce again and reportedly withdrew an assault complaint against Penn following an incident at their Malibu, California, home during the New Year weekend. Penn was alleged to have struck Madonna on multiple occasions during their marriage in the book Madonna Unauthorized. Madonna denied the allegations stating they were "completely outrageous, malicious, reckless, and false" in 2015.

In 1989, Penn began dating actress Robin Wright, and their first child, a daughter named Dylan Frances, was born April 13, 1991. Their second child, son Hopper Jack, was born August 6, 1993. Penn and Wright separated in 1995, during which time he developed a relationship with Jewel, after he spotted her performing on Late Night with Conan O'Brien. He invited her to compose a song for his film The Crossing Guard (1995) and followed her on tour. Penn reconciled with Wright and they married on April 27, 1996.

The couple filed for divorce in December 2007 but reconciled several months later, requesting a court dismissal of their divorce case. In April 2009, Penn filed for legal separation, only to withdraw the case once again when the couple reconciled in May. On August 12, 2009, Wright filed for divorce again. The couple's divorce was finalized on July 22, 2010; the couple reached a private agreement on child and spousal support, division of assets, and custody of Hopper, who was almost 17 at the time.

In December 2013, Penn began dating South African actress Charlize Theron. Their relationship ended in June 2015. Despite reports that they were engaged, Theron stated that they were never engaged. Theron starred in Penn's film The Last Face (2016), which they filmed while still a couple.

In 2016, Penn began a relationship with Australian-American actress Leila George, daughter of actors Vincent D'Onofrio and Greta Scacchi. They married on July 30, 2020. George filed for divorce on October 15, 2021. Their divorce was finalized on April 22, 2022. In June 2023, Penn began a relationship with Ukrainian Olga Korotyayeva. Although typically private about relationships, Penn confirmed he was again single during a June 2024 interview.

=== Legal issues ===
In October 1985, Penn pled no contest to charges that he assaulted two journalists when they tried to photograph him and Madonna in Nashville in June 1985. He was fined $50 on each of two misdemeanor charges of assault and battery. In January 1986, Penn was charged for allegedly assaulting Leonel Borralho, Macau correspondent for the Hong Kong Standard newspaper, after he photographed Madonna and Penn as they arrived at their hotel room. In June 1986, Penn was charged with misdemeanor battery for assaulting songwriter David Wolinski at Helena's nightclub in Los Angeles. Wolinski said Penn accused him of trying to kiss Madonna. Penn pled not guilty to the charge.

In April 1987, Penn violated probation and was arrested for punching a film extra, Jeffrey Klein, on set of the movie Colors. Penn was sentenced to 60 days in jail for this assault and reckless driving in June 1987, of which he served 33 days. According to Penn himself, he was incarcerated in the same jail holding Richard Ramirez, a serial killer awaiting trial. Ramirez wrote to Penn, to which Penn wrote back saying he had no kinship for his fellow inmate and hopes Ramirez receives capital punishment via the gas chamber. In May 2010, Penn pleaded no contest to a misdemeanor charge stemming from an altercation with photographer Frank Mateljan in October 2009. He was sentenced to perform 300 hours of community service and undergo 36 hours of anger management counseling.

In an interview published September 16, 2015, director and showrunner Lee Daniels responded to criticism about Terrence Howard's continued career in light of his domestic violence issues by referencing Penn's rumored history of domestic violence, saying: "[Terrence] ain't done nothing different than Marlon Brando or Sean Penn, and all of a sudden he's some f—in' demon." In response, Penn launched a $10 million defamation suit against Daniels, alleging that he had never been arrested for or charged with domestic violence. Penn dropped the lawsuit in May 2016 after Daniels retracted his statement and apologized.

== Political views and activism ==
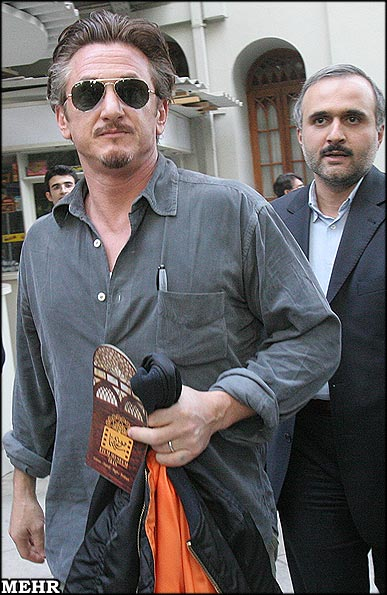
Penn in Tehran in June 2005

Penn has been outspoken in supporting numerous political and social causes. On December 13–16, 2002, he visited Iraq to protest against the Bush administration's apparent plans for a military strike on Iraq. On June 10, 2005, Penn visited Iran, where, acting as a journalist on an assignment for the San Francisco Chronicle, he attended a Friday prayer at Tehran University.

In response to the 2004 satirical film Team America: World Police, in which a caricatured puppet of Penn claims Baathist Iraq was a utopia with "rainbow skies" and "rivers made of chocolate" before the US military and the Coalition of the Willing invaded and removed Saddam Hussein from power in 2003, Penn sent an angry letter to its creators Trey Parker and Matt Stone, inviting them to tour Iraq with him and ending with the statement, "fuck you".

On January 7, 2006, Penn joined author and media critic Norman Solomon and activist Cindy Sheehan as a special guest at their "Out of Iraq Forum" in Sacramento, California for the Progressive Democrats of America, an event organized to support and promote the anti-Iraq War movement. On December 18, 2006, Penn received the Christopher Reeve First Amendment Award from the Creative Coalition for his commitment to free speech.

In August 2008, Penn attended one of Ralph Nader's "Open the Debates" super rallies, protesting against the exclusion of Nader and other third-party candidates. In October 2008, Penn visited Cuba, where he met with and interviewed then Cuban president Raúl Castro.

In 2021, Penn denounced cancel culture, describing it as "ludicrous".

=== George W. Bush administration ===
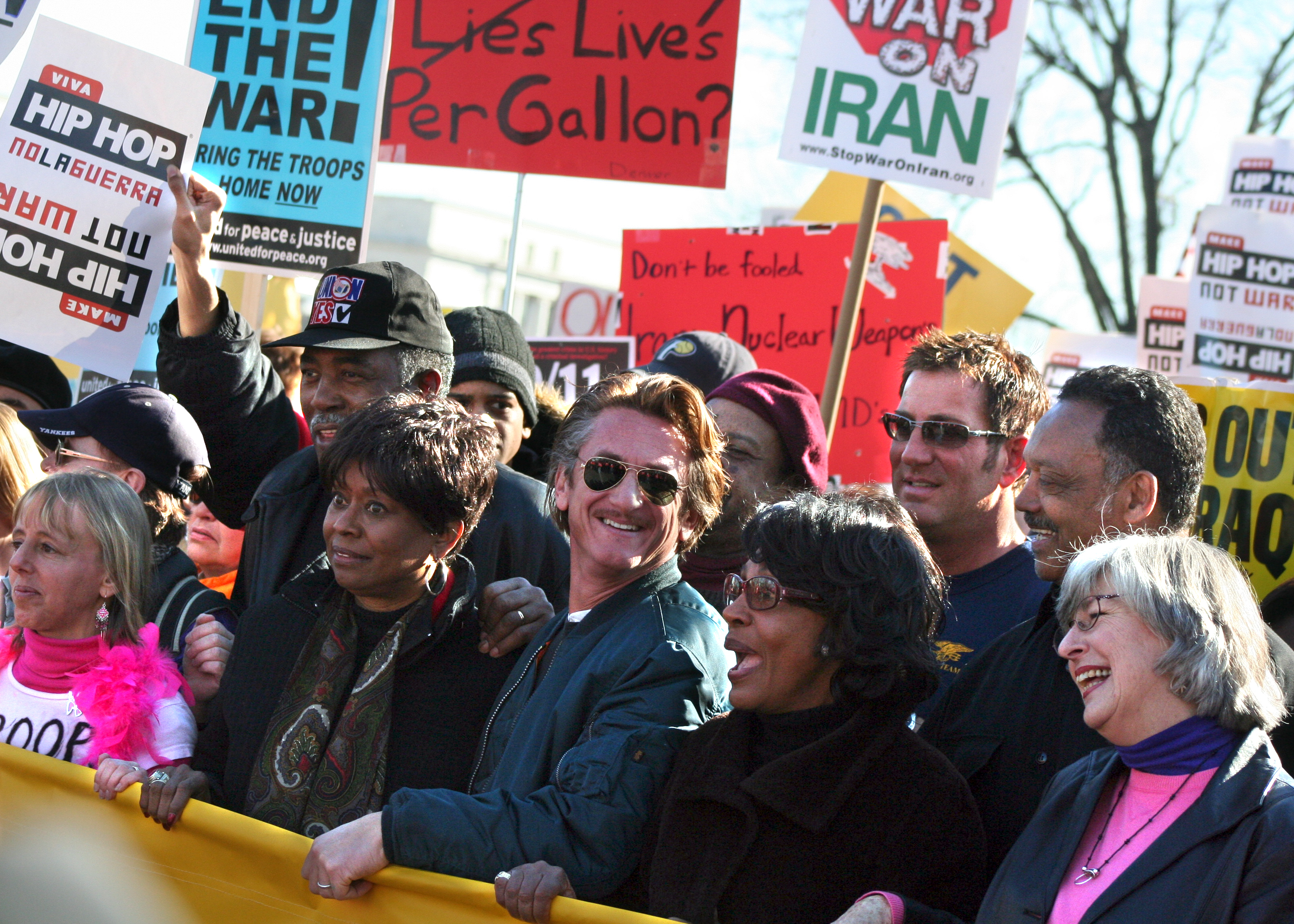
Penn at the anti-Iraq War rally in Washington, D.C., in January 2007

On October 18, 2002, Penn placed a $56,000 advertisement in The Washington Post, publicly asking then President George W. Bush to end military hostilities in Iraq and elsewhere. The advertisement was written as an open letter and referred to the planned attack on Iraq and the war on terror.

In the letter, Penn also criticized the Bush administration for its "deconstruction of civil liberties" and its "simplistic and inflammatory view of good and evil." Penn visited Iraq briefly in December 2002. The criticism drew praise from Penn's ex-wife Madonna, who said, "Sean is one of the few. Good for him. Most celebrities are keeping their heads down. Nobody wants to be unpopular. But then Americans, by and large, are pretty ignorant of what's going on in the world."

The Post advertisement was cited as a primary reason for the development of his relationship with Venezuelan president Hugo Chávez. In one of his televised speeches, Chávez used and read aloud an open letter Penn wrote to Bush. The letter condemned the Iraq War, called for Bush to be impeached, and also called then US Vice President Dick Cheney and US Secretary of State Condoleezza Rice "villainously and criminally obscene people."

On April 19, 2007, Penn appeared on The Colbert Report and had a "Meta-Free-Phor-All" versus Stephen Colbert that was judged by Robert Pinsky following Penn's criticisms of Bush. In the appearance, Penn said, "We cower as you point your fingers telling us to support our troops. You and the smarmy pundits in your pocket– those who bathe in the moisture of your soiled and blood-soaked underwear–can take that noise and shove it." He won the contest with 10,000,000 points to Colbert's 1.

On December 7, 2007, Penn said he supported Ohio Congressman Dennis J. Kucinich in the 2008 US presidential election, and again criticized Bush's handling of the Iraq War. Penn questioned whether Bush's daughters, Jenna and Barbara, supported the war in Iraq.

=== Natural disasters ===
In September 2005, Penn traveled to New Orleans, to aid Hurricane Katrina victims. He was physically involved in rescuing people, although there was criticism that his involvement was a PR stunt as he hired a photographer to come along with his entourage. Penn denied such accusations in an article he wrote for HuffPost. Director Spike Lee interviewed Penn for Lee's documentary about Hurricane Katrina, When the Levees Broke: A Requiem in Four Acts (2006).

After the 2010 Haiti earthquake, Penn founded the J/P Haitian Relief Organization, which operated a 55,000 person tent camp. Prior to founding the organization, Penn acknowledged he had never visited Haiti and did not speak French or Creole. When asked about critics who questioned his experience on Haiti, he said he hopes they "die screaming of rectal cancer".

On January 31, 2012, due largely to his visibility as an on-the-ground advocate for rescue and aid efforts in the aftermath, Penn was designated by then Haitian president Michel Martelly as Ambassador-at-Large for Haiti, the first time a non-Haitian citizen has held the position in the country's history. Also in 2012, at the 12th World Summit of Nobel Peace Laureates, Penn was recognized with the Peace Summit Award.

=== Gender and sexual orientation ===
On February 22, 2009, Penn received the Academy Award for Best Actor for the film Milk. In his acceptance speech, he said: "I think that it is a good time for those who voted for the ban against gay marriage to sit and reflect and anticipate their great shame and the shame in their grandchildren's eyes if they continue that way of support. We've got to have equal rights for everyone!" In 2022, Penn expressed his position on masculinity, saying, "I am in the club that believes that men in American culture have become wildly feminised...I don't think that [in order] to be fair to women, we should become them." He later told The Independent that "I think that men have, in my view, become quite feminised...There are a lot of, I think, cowardly genes that lead to people surrendering their jeans and putting on a skirt."

=== International affairs ===
Penn gained significant attention in Pakistan media when he visited Karachi and Badin in 2012. On March 23, 2012, accompanied by US Consul General William J. Martin, Penn visited flood-stricken villages in Karim Bux Jamali, Dargah Shah Gurio, and Peero Lashari in the Badin District, where he distributed blankets, quilts, kitchen items, and other goods to flood survivors.

On March 24, 2012, during his visit to Pakistan, Penn visited Bilquis Edhi Female Child Home and met Pakistani humanitarian worker Abdul Sattar Edhi and his wife Bilquis Edhi and laid floral wreaths at the shrine of Abdullah Shah Ghazi in honor of him.

Penn played a role in securing the release of American entrepreneur Jacob Ostreicher from a Bolivian prison in 2013, and was credited by Ostreicher for having personally nursed him back to health at Penn's home after his release.

Penn is the founder of the nonprofit organization Community Organized Relief Effort (CORE), which distributed aid in Haiti following the country's 2010 earthquake and Hurricane Matthew and administered free COVID-19 diagnostic tests in the US during the COVID-19 pandemic.

In October 2021, the National Labor Relations Board filed a complaint that Penn and CORE violated US federal labor law, contending that Penn "impliedly threatened" his employees with reprisals after they complained about working conditions, which allegedly included 18-hour work days.

==== Syria ====
In February 2012, during the Syrian civil war, Penn stood beside Venezuelan president Hugo Chávez as Venezuela supported the government of Syria, led by Bashar al-Assad.

==== Venezuela ====
Penn and Chávez maintained a friendship. In March 2010, Penn called for the imprisonment of journalists who referred to Venezuelan President Hugo Chávez as a dictator. Penn's was criticized by conservative and libertarian media sources, including National Review and Reason. When Chávez died in 2013, Penn said: "Venezuela and its revolution will endure under the proven leadership of Vice President Nicolás Maduro. Today the United States lost a friend it never knew it had. And poor people around the world lost a champion. I lost a friend I was blessed to have." Penn's friendship with Chávez and his praise for Cuban dictator Raúl Castro have been criticized by human rights activist Thor Halvorssen and media, including The New York Times, the Los Angeles Times, The New Criterion, and The Advocate, each of which alleged that Castro and Chávez's strong anti-LGBT stances clashed with Penn's support for LGBT groups. Actress María Conchita Alonso, who co-starred with Penn in Colors, also issued an "Open Letter to Sean Penn", attacking his views on Chávez. In December 2011, Alonso and Penn began verbally fighting at an airport, during which Penn called her "a pig" and Alonso called Penn a communist.

==== Mexico ====
On January 9, 2016, a day after Mexican officials announced the capture of fugitive Sinaloa Cartel boss Joaquín "El Chapo" Guzmán in a militarized raid, Rolling Stone reported that Penn and actress Kate del Castillo had conducted a secret interview with El Chapo prior to his arrest. Del Castillo was contacted by Guzmán's lawyer, who was then under CISEN surveillance, to discuss producing a biographical film about Guzmán, and communication between the two increased following Guzmán's escape from a Mexican prison in July 2015. The deal for the interview was brokered by del Castillo.

According to text messages released between Penn and del Castillo, El Chapo did not know who Sean Penn was. CISEN released photographs of del Castillo at the meetings with Guzmán's lawyers and of Penn and del Castillo arriving in Mexico. The interview was criticized by the White House, which called it "maddening". Mexican authorities said they sought to question Penn over the interview, which had not been approved by either the American or Mexican government. Penn and del Castillo's meeting with Guzmán was investigated by the attorney general of Mexico. Del Castillo acknowledged that she never resumed communication with Penn after the release of the Rolling Stone article. In October 2025, Del Castillo harshly criticized Penn, calling him "scum" and accusing him of using her as "bait" during their 2015 meeting with Guzmán. Penn had never told her that he had planned to write the article despite her central role in arranging the meeting.

==== Armenia ====
In October 2020, Penn tweeted support for Armenia in the Nagorno-Karabakh war between Armenia and Azerbaijan. He also criticized Turkey's involvement in the conflict and close Turkey–United States ties and simultaneously endorsed Joe Biden in the 2020 US presidential election. Penn said, "Armenians are being slaughtered by Trump pal Erdogan with weapons WE provided. THIS is NOT America! Biden for America's new birth!".

==== Ukraine ====
In 2022, Penn visited Ukraine to film a documentary about the Russian invasion of that country. Penn attended press briefings in Kyiv, met with officials and spoke to journalists and military personnel about the Russian invasion. On February 25, 2022, Penn said, "If we allow it [Ukraine] to fight alone, our soul as America is lost."

Penn also praised the response from the Ukrainian government and its citizens. As Penn and his team prepared to leave Ukraine, they abandoned their car and walked with their luggage for miles to the Polish border. Russia is sanctioning Penn over his Ukraine support.

In Kyiv in November 2022, Penn lent an Oscar statuette to President Zelenskyy, saying, "This is for you. It's just a symbolic silly thing...When you win, bring it back to Malibu." Zelenskyy, in turn, awarded Penn the Ukrainian Order of Merit.

In March 2026, he visited Ukraine for the fifth time, choosing to be there instead of attending the Academy Awards ceremony, where he had been named a winner for his role in One Battle After Another. During his stay, he received a symbolic Oscar-like metal statuette, crafted from the material of a railway car that had been damaged during shelling in Ukraine.

==== Falkland Islands ====
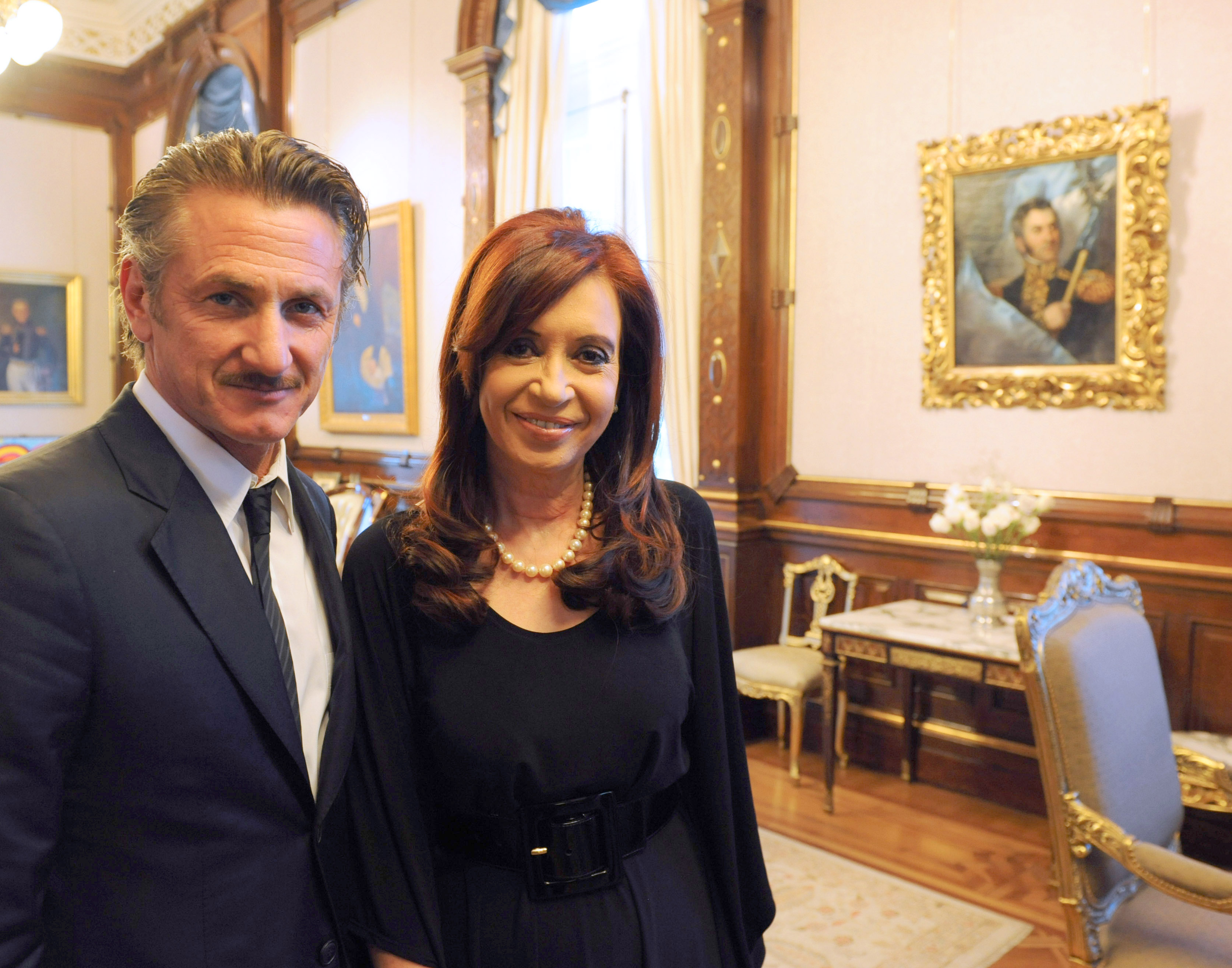
Penn and President of Argentina Cristina Fernández de Kirchner during Penn's visit to Argentina in February 2012

In February 2012, Penn met with the president of Argentina, Cristina Fernández de Kirchner, in Buenos Aires, where he commented on the long-running dispute between Argentina and the United Kingdom over the Falkland Islands, saying: "I know I came in a very sensitive moment in terms of diplomacy between Argentina and the UK over the Falkland Islands. And I hope that diplomats can establish true dialogue in order to solve the conflict as the world today cannot tolerate ridiculous demonstrations of colonialism. The way of dialogue is the only way to achieve a better solution for both nations."

The comments were taken as support of Argentina's claim to the islands and evoked reactions in British media, including a satirical article in The Daily Telegraph requesting that Penn "return his Malibu estate to the Mexicans".

In February 2012, Penn's comments on the Falklands dispute were criticized by Falklands War veteran and political activist Simon Weston, who said, "Sean Penn does not know what he is talking about and, frankly, he should shut up. His [Penn's] views are irrelevant and it only serves to fuel the fire of the Argentinians and get them more pumped up." British Conservative MP Patrick Mercer called Penn's statement on the Falklands "moronic". Lauren Collins wrote in The New Yorker, "As of today, Sean Penn is the new Karl Lagerfeld—the man upon whom, having disrespected something dear to the United Kingdom, the British papers most gleefully pile contempt".

Penn later claimed his comments were misrepresented in British press and that his criticism of "colonialism" was a reference to the deployment of Prince William as an air-sea rescue pilot, describing it as a "message of pre-emptive intimidation". He claimed that the Prince's posting meant "the automatic deployment of warships", and stated: "My oh my, aren't people sensitive to the word 'colonialism', particularly those who implement colonialism."

In an op-ed written in The Guardian, Penn wrote that "the legalisation of Argentinian immigration to the Malvinas/Falkland Islands is one that it seems might have been addressed, but for the speculative discovery of booming offshore oil in the surrounding seas this past year" and that it was "irresponsible journalism" to suggest "that I had taken a specific position against those currently residing in the Malvinas/Falkland Islands, that they should either be deported or absorbed into Argentine rule. I neither said, nor insinuated that".

== Acting credits and accolades ==
Penn has appeared in over 50 films and won several awards during his career as an actor and director, including two Academy Awards for Best Actor for Mystic River in 2003 and Milk in 2008, and was nominated three more times in the same category for Dead Man Walking (1995), Sweet and Lowdown (1999), and I Am Sam (2001). He won the Academy Award for Best Supporting Actor for his performance in One Battle After Another (2025), making him one of only four male actors in history, along with Walter Brennan, Jack Nicholson, and Daniel Day-Lewis, to receive an Academy Award for best performance three times. He also received a Directors Guild of America nomination for directing Into the Wild (2007). In 2015, Penn received the Honorary César for lifetime achievement.

== Published works ==
- Bob Honey Who Just Do Stuff (Atria Books, 2018)
- Bob Honey Sings Jimmy Crack Corn (Rare Bird Books, 2019)

== See also ==
- List of actors with two or more Academy Awards in acting categories
- List of agnostics
