= Center Stage: On Pointe =

- Poster
- Based on: Characters by Carol Heikkinen
- Written by: Nisha Ganatra
- Directed by: Director X
- Starring: Nicole Muñoz; Kenny Wormald; Chloé Lukasiak; Peter Gallagher
- Music by: Patric Caird
- Country of origin: Canada
- Original language: English

Production
- Executive producers: Laurence Mark; Nisha Ganatra
- Producers: Greg Malcolm; Vicki Sotheran
- Cinematography: Pieter Stathis
- Editor: Charles Robichaud
- Running time: 92 minutes
- Production companies: Destination Films; Sodona Films

Original release
- Network: Lifetime
- Release: June 25, 2016

Center Stage: On Pointe is a 2016 teen drama television film, directed by Director X and choreographed by Monica Proenca. The film stars Nicole Muñoz, Barton Cowperthwaite, Maude Green, Chloe Lukasiak, Kenny Wormald and Peter Gallagher. It premiered on Lifetime on June 25, 2016.

The official DVD was released September 6, 2016. It is the third installment in the Center Stage film series, following the 2000 film Center Stage and its sequel, Center Stage: Turn It Up.

== Plot ==
To solve its financial problems, the American Ballet Company (ABC), headed by Jonathan Reeves (Peter Gallagher), seeks to expand its repertoire from ballet to add the more popular contemporary dance. Tommy (Kenny Wormald), Charlie (Sascha Radetsky), and Cooper (Ethan Stiefel) start a competitive camp to recruit new dancers for ABC.

Bella Parker (Nicole Muñoz) has always been in the shadow of her sister Kate (Rachele Brooke Smith), a famous ballet dancer. She changes her last name (Miller) to avoid comparisons and, to her surprise, she is chosen for the camp. Bella has trouble fitting in, and the instructor, Lorenza (Sarah-Jane Redmond), a ballet snob, is brutally critical of Bella's dancing. When she is partnered with quiet Damon (Barton Cowperthwite), however, she gains confidence, as the two open up to each other.

Rumors surface about one of the dancers, Allegra (Maude Green), and the dancers take sides. Bella strives to remain focused as the day of final audition arrives. When Allegra loses her partner, Bella generously lends her Damon; but in a surprise twist, Bella joins the two on stage, and all three are accepted to ABC.

== Cast ==
- Nicole Muñoz as Bella Parker
- Barton Cowperthwaite as Damon
- Maude Green as Allegra
- Peter Gallagher as Jonathan Reeves
- Sarah-Jane Redmond as Lorenza
- Kenny Wormald as Tommy Anderson
- Sascha Radetsky as Charlie Sims
- Ethan Stiefel as Cooper Nielsen
- Rachele Brooke Smith as Kate Parker
- Chloe Lukasiak as Gwen Murphy
- Kyle Toy as Ivan
- Thomas L. Colford as Richard
- Kyal Legend as Candie
- Lanie McAuley as Wendy
- Kane Nelson as Sam
- Tara Wilson as Yoga Instructor

== Production ==
The film was shot in Vancouver, British Columbia, Canada. Principal photography started and finished in November 2015.

== Reception ==
Variety critic Sonia Saraiya found Center Stage: On Pointe wholly inferior to the original Center Stage, complimenting only the direction of Director X noting "...though it is frustrating that the film feels like 15-odd low-budget music videos strung together, the dance in those segments, and the way it's filmed, are some of the best parts of the movie." Cara Kelly of USA Today agreed that, like Center Stage: On Pointe's strength "is still there: the nicely choreographed and heartfelt dance scenes performed by real dancers."

The A.V. Club's Danette Chavez was more mixed in her review, giving the film a C+, and remarking that "Muñoz is a charming lead" but noting that "On Pointe gets too ambitious..." with the film's message. Keith Uhlich of The Hollywood Reporter was the most negative in his assessment of the film, criticizing all of the dance sequences in the film as "poorly staged and often inexplicably photographed in slow-motion", and surmising that, "By the time the climactic, Rihanna-scored musical number arrives, your attention will have long since waltzed off."
