= Bolivian prosecutorial extortion ring =

A cluster of officials in the Bolivian Ministries of Government and the Presidency and prosecutor's offices are alleged to have constituted an extortion ring that demanded cash from individuals facing prosecution, including American investor Jacob Ostreicher. The ring has been the subject of official investigation since November 2012. Its central figures are allegedly Fernando Rivera Tardío and Dennis Efraín Rodas, both lawyers for the Bolivian Minister of Government; Boris Villegas Rocabado, former Director of the Interior Regime another division of the Ministry of Government; and Jose Manuel Antezana Pinaya, an official in the Ministry of the Presidency. Members of the network approached indicted, and usually imprisoned persons, offering to resolve their cases in exchange for payments from $5,000 to $100,000. The Associated Press has described the affair as "the biggest scandal to face the country's judicial system." As of 5 December 2012, the Ministry of Government reported that it had nine proven denunciations of corruption against the ring. By December 26, at least thirty denunciations had been received.

Twelve people including prosecutors, government officials, and the judge who originally had Jacob Ostreicher imprisoned have been arrested in what authorities say was an extortion ring.

- Gustavo Dagner Cespedes Rosales Arrested on 11/27/2012 – Minister of Government’s Representative in Santa Cruz.
- Fernando Rivera Tardio - Arrested on 11/28/2012 – One of the ringleaders of “The Red” - Attended most of Jacob’ Ostreicher's hearings and threatened judges openly with arrest if they were to release Jacob. Fernando Rivera was the judicial counsel for the Minister of Government.
- Denis Efrain Rodas Limachi – Arrested 11/29/2012 – worked with Fernando Rivera Tardio.
- Jose Manuel Antezana Pinaya – Arrested on 11/26/2012 – worked in the office of the “Ministry of Presidency”.
- Roberto Isabelino Gomez Cervero : Arrested 12/3/2012 – Former District Attorney of Santa Cruz Bolivia.
- Miguel Alberto Gutierrez Soliz : Arrested 12/3/2012 – Lawyer for DIRCABI (Gov’t Division in charge of confiscated goods).
- Mosies Aguilera Lopez : Arrested 12/11/2012 – Administrator of DIRCABI (Gov’t Division in charge of confiscated goods).
- Janet Velarde Luna : Arrested on 12/8/2012 – Lead Prosecutor in Jacob’s case (until a few months ago. She requested a transfer to another division).
- Roberto Acha Arandia : Arrested on 12/20/2012 – Prosecutor in tandem with Janet Velarde Luna (was removed several months ago after a DUI).
- Cori Balcaza De Acha : Arrested on 12/20/2012 – Wife of Roberto Acha implicated in extortion.
- Boris Villegas Rocabado : Arrested 12/11/12 – Head of Internal Affairs.
- Ramiro Ordonez Lopez – Arrested.
- Franklin Pedraza Suarez – Under House Arrest – Employee of DIRCABI.
- Ariel Rocha – Arrest warrant issued 12/19/2012 Fled the country.
