= Monica Proenca =

Brazilian dance choreographer

- Born: July 6, 1972 (age 52); Rio de Janeiro, Brazil
- Occupation(s): Choreographer, dancer
- Years active: 2001–present

Monica Proenca is a dance choreographer. She was born in Rio de Janeiro, Brazil, and graduated from the San Francisco School of the Arts. As a professional dancer Proenca has worked with classical and contemporary choreographers. She has taught and choreographed in Spain, US, Germany, Japan, Brazil and Canada. Her choreography has been performed and awarded in more than 15 countries. She was a nominee for the 4th Annual Inspirational Latin American Awards for Arts and Culture (2015).

Proenca choreographed the film Center Stage: On Pointe, produced by Sony Pictures. Proenca currently lives in Vancouver, Canada and continues to choreograph, produce, dance and coach.
