= Jacob Ostreicher =

American businessman and investor (born 1959)

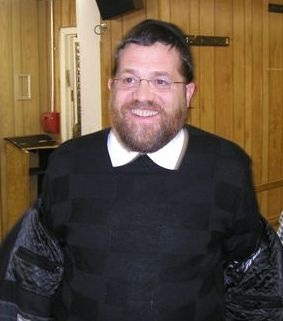
- Jacob Ostreicher in Santa Cruz, Palmasola Prison
- Born: February 7, 1959 (age 67); Brooklyn, New York
- Occupations: Businessman, investor
- Parent(s): David Ostreicher; Violet Ostreicher

Jacob Ostreicher (born February 7, 1959) is an American businessman and investor. In June 2011, he was arrested in Santa Cruz, Bolivia, while overseeing a rice growing agricultural venture that he had invested in, and was jailed for 18 months on suspicion of money laundering, though he was never formally charged. Ostreicher maintained his innocence and stated that the allegations by the Bolivian government were "the scam of the century". His family and friends initiated a public effort to plea for his release, and actor-activist Sean Penn visited Ostreicher in Bolivia and pledged to work for his release.

On December 18, 2012, Ostreicher was released from prison on $14,000 bail and placed under house arrest. Bolivian officials were later arrested for what authorities state was an extortion ring. On December 16, 2013, Ostreicher arrived in the United States after 30 months in Bolivia. It was unclear how he managed to flee the country.

== Background ==
=== Personal life ===
Ostreicher was born in Brooklyn, New York, in 1959 to David and Violet Ostreicher, both Orthodox Jews. He has 2 children and 7 grandchildren.

=== Bolivian investment and arrest ===
A group of investors, including Ostreicher and Geneva lawyer Andre Zolty, invested at least $25 million in a rice farming project in Bolivia in 2008. Zolty stated that the idea originally came from Claudia Liliana Rodriguez who he had worked with in Geneva. The investors became concerned with irregularities and suspected that Rodriguez was cheating them. Ostreicher was dispatched to Bolivia to handle the situation, and pursued criminal charges against Rodriguez. The investors also state that Rodriguez became involved in a romantic and financial relationship with a drug trafficker by the name of Maximiliano Dorado.

Dorado was arrested in 2010, and was imprisoned in Brazil.

On June 4, 2011, after an initial investigation, Ostreicher was arrested for suspicion of money laundering and criminal organization. The prosecutors also claimed that one of the investors, Andre Zolty, was under investigation in Switzerland, however, the Swiss authorities have denied this. Rodriguez has also been arrested. Ostreicher was imprisoned at Palmasola prison.

Ostreicher was brought before a judge who after several hearings ordered for him to be released on September 23, 2011. However the judge reversed his decision a week later. A month later the judge was promoted and a new judge was assigned to the case. Following several postponements, the second judge recused himself from the case; no other judge had yet to be assigned.

A marriage certificate showing Ostreicher was married in Bolivia was entered into evidence during the September 23 hearing. Ostreicher denied that he was married to a Bolivian.

Ostreicher was visited by actor Sean Penn on October 31, 2012.

Bolivian law allows for imprisonment without charge for 18 months during the investigative phase. Since Ostreicher was arrested in early June 2011, the 18-month mark occurred in early December 2012.

Ostreicher appeared in a hearing on Tuesday, December 11, and the judge ordered that the case be sent back to the lower court. Actor Penn was present at the hearing. On December 18, Ostreicher was released from prison on $14,000 bail and was placed under house arrest.

== Government extortion ring ==
Fifteen people, including prosecutors, government officials, and the judge who originally had Ostreicher imprisoned, were arrested in what authorities say was an extortion ring. They include:

- Gustavo Dagner Cespedes Rosales - arrested on 11/27/2012. Minister of Government's Representative in Santa Cruz.
- Fernando Rivera Tardio - arrested on 11/28/2012. Judicial Counsel for the Minister of Government. One of the ring leaders of "The Red". Attended most of Jacob Ostreicher's hearings and threatened judges openly with arrest if they were to release Jacob.
- Denis Efrain Rodas Limachi – arrested on 11/29/2012. Worked together with Fernando Rivera Tardio.
- Jose Manuel Antezana Pinaya – arrested on 11/26/2012. Worked in the office of the Ministry of Presidency.
- Roberto Isabelino Gomez Cervero - arrested on 12/3/2012. Former District Attorney of Santa Cruz Bolivia.
- Miguel Alberto Gutierrez Soliz - arrested on 12/3/2012. Lawyer for DIRCABI (Government Division in charge of confiscated goods).
- Mosies Aguilera Lopez - arrested on 12/11/2012. Administrator of DIRCABI.
- Janet Velarde Luna - arrested on 12/8/2012. Lead Prosecutor in Ostreicher case until she requested transfer to another division in 2013.
- Roberto Acha Arandia - arrested on 12/20/2012. Prosecutor in tandem with Janet Velarde Luna (was removed in 2013 after a DUI).
- Cori Balcaza De Acha - arrested on 12/20/2012. Wife of Roberto Acha, implicated in extortion.
- Boris Villegas Rocabado - arrested on 12/11/12. Head of Internal Affairs.
- Ramiro Ordonez Lopez – arrested.
- Franklin Pedraza Suarez – under house arrest. Employee of DIRCABI.
- Ariel Rocha – arrest warrant issued on 12/19/2012. Fled the country.

== Public campaigns ==
=== Rally ===
A rally was held for Ostreicher in front of the Bolivian Mission in New York City on May 3, 2012. The rally was arranged by Brooklyn Assemblyman Dov Hikind.

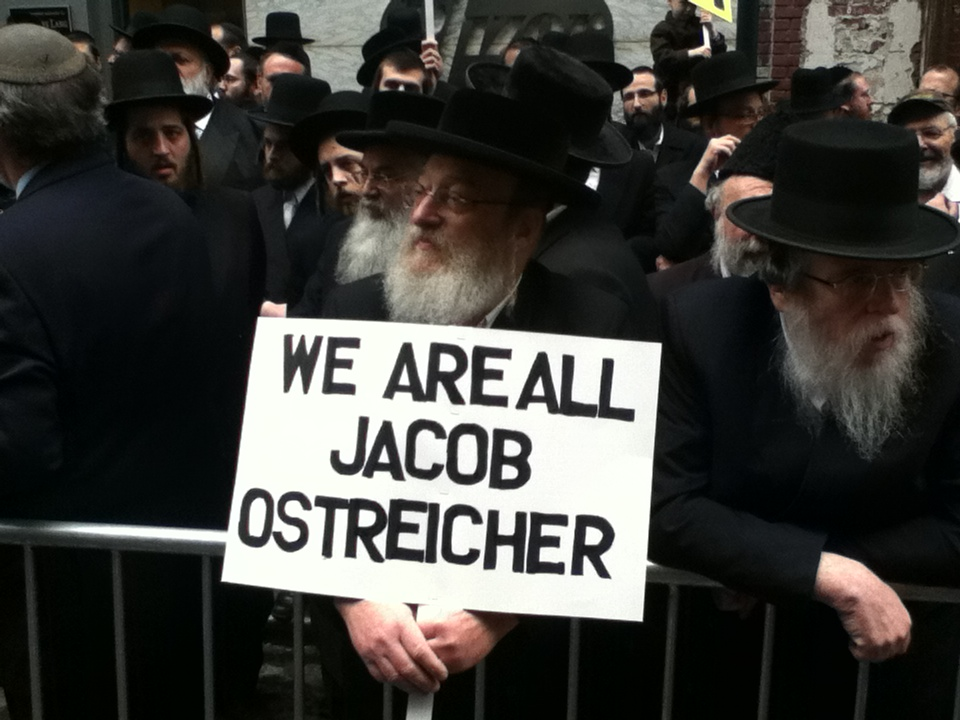
Man holding a sign at a rally in NYC

=== White House petition ===
On May 3, 2012, supporters of Ostreicher initiated an online petition on the White House We the People website requesting the Obama Administration to assist in the effort to free Jacob. As of December 2, 2019, 35,958 people signed the petition. A total of 25,000 signatures were needed by June 2, 2012, in order to submit the petition to the White House; this requirement was met.

=== Congressional hearings ===
Representative Chris Smith (R-NJ) held a hearing in the Congress on June 6, 2012, to investigate the role that the United States Department of State has played in helping free Jacob from Bolivia.

Hearings were also held on August 1, 2012, and May 20, 2013.

== Return to United States ==
On December 16, 2013, Ostreicher arrived in the US after 30 months in Bolivia. He was reported to be in an undisclosed location with Sean Penn and receiving medical attention. It was unclear how he had fled the country.

In May 2014 Ostreicher revealed that after his release, Penn had personally nursed him back to mental and physical health at the latter's home.

== Sources ==
- Bajak, Frank (24 August 2011). "US businessman invests in Bolivia, ends up jailed". Associated Press/Failed Messiah.
- Guillén, Guider Arancibia (1 August 2011). "Canciller pide ayuda internacional para combatir el narcotráfico en el país". El Deber. Archived from the original on October 15, 2012.
- Te interesa esta noticia. "Bolivia: 10 meses preso sin cargos".
- Penn, Sean (20 December 2012). "Breached Piñatas". The Huffington Post.
