= Thanksgiving (Scream Queens) =

- Scream Queens episode
- Episode no.: Season 1 Episode 10
- Directed by: Michael Lehmann
- Written by: Brad Falchuk
- Production code: 1AYD10
- Original air date: November 24, 2015
- Running time: 44 minutes

Guest appearances
- Chad Michael Murray as Brad Radwell; Alan Thicke as Tad Radwell; Julia Duffy as Bunny Radwell; Patrick Schwarzenegger as Thad Radwell; Gary Grubbs as Mr. Swenson; Faith Prince as Kristy Swenson; LB Brown as Freddy Swenson; Rachele Brooke Smith as Muffy St. Pierre-Radwell

Episode chronology
← Previous "Ghost Stories"	Next → "Black Friday"

"Thanksgiving" is the tenth episode of the horror black comedy series Scream Queens. It premiered on November 24, 2015 on Fox. The episode was directed by Michael Lehmann and written by Brad Falchuk. The episode features special guest star Chad Michael Murray as Brad Radwell, the older brother of Chad Radwell (Glen Powell). The rest of the Radwell family are played by guest stars Alan Thicke, Julia Duffy, Patrick Schwarzenegger, and Rachele Brooke Smith. As this is the Thanksgiving special episode, the episode centers around the main characters' activities during Thanksgiving.

The episode was watched by 1.98 million viewers and received positive reviews from critics.

== Plot ==
Chad takes Chanel to spend Thanksgiving with his family. Hester arrives unexpectedly. Chad tells his family that Hester is his "sober coach," claiming that he has a drinking problem. A fight ensues. After enduring shabby treatment from the Radwell family, Chanel apologizes for trying to kill Hester and then proceeds to tell off each of the Radwells, ending with Chad, and telling him she never wants to talk to him again.

Gigi spends Thanksgiving with Red Devil in their hotel room.

Chanel #3 goes to spend Thanksgiving with her adopted family, but is so disgusted by how arrogant and insane they are that she goes back to campus, where she spends the holiday with Dean Cathy Munsch and fellow students. As Chanel goes to uncover the turkey, it is revealed that instead of holding the turkey, the platter is holding Gigi's head.

== Production ==
On September 11, 2015, Ryan Murphy announced that Patrick Schwarzenegger is joining the cast of Scream Queens. He portrayed Thad Radwell, the younger brother of Glen Powell's character Chad Radwell. On, Chad Michael Murray was cast as Brad Radwell, the older brother of Chad. Alan Thicke and Julia Duffy were cast as The Radwells' parents. They all made their guest appearance in this episode. Gary Grubbs and Faith Prince also guest starred in this episode as Chanel #3 (Billie Lourd)'s adoptive parents, Mr. and Mrs. Swenson. Rachele Brooke Smith appears as Muffy St. Pierre-Radwell, the wife of Chad Michael Murray's character Brad.

== Reception ==
=== Ratings ===
"Thanksgiving" was watched live by 1.98 million U.S. viewers and received a 0.8/3 rating/share in the adult 18-49 demographic.

=== Reception ===
"Thanksgiving" received positive reviews from critics. LaToya Ferguson of The A.V. Club gave the episode an A−, citing "Again—and I can’t stress this enough—the episode is fun. Humor is apart [sic] of that, but it’s really an enjoyable episode to watch from top to bottom." IGN's Terri Schwartz gave the episode 8.5 out of 10 and said, "Scream Queens was losing me for a while, but the twist that Wes is the father of the bathtub girl's twins genuinely surprised me, and added a fun new, personal layer to the Red Devil Killer(s) mystery. Add that to a fun game of who-dunn-it and the introduction of the absolutely hatable Radwells and this was a great return to form for the FOX series."
