= The Living (film) =

- Film poster
- Directed by: Jack Bryan
- Written by: Jack Bryan
- Produced by: Jack Bryan; Laura DuBois; John Snyder
- Starring: Fran Kranz; Jocelin Donahue; Kenny Wormald; Chris Mulkey; Joelle Carter
- Cinematography: Aleksandar Kosutic
- Edited by: Frank Reynolds
- Music by: Matthew de Luca; Neil de Luca
- Production company: Shooting Films
- Distributed by: Monterey Media
- Release date: July 2014 (MFF)
- Running time: 91 minutes
- Country: United States
- Language: English
- Budget: $500,000
- Box office: $5,514 (US)

The Living is a 2014 American drama film written and directed by Jack Bryan and starring Fran Kranz, Jocelin Donahue, Kenny Wormald, Chris Mulkey, and Joelle Carter. It follows a man named Teddy (Kranz) who beats his wife Molly (Donahue) in a drunken rage. After learning of what happened, her brother Gordon (Wormald) hires an ex-con (Mulkey) to murder Teddy. The film premiered at the 2014 Manhattan Film Festival.

== Plot ==
Teddy wakes up from a night of binge drinking. His wedding band is missing, and his fist is bloodied. When he cannot find his wife, Molly, he visits his mother-in-law's house. There, Molly's mother, Angela, and her brother, Gordon, explain that she wants nothing to do with him, as he beat her severely while drunk. Teddy protests that he does not remember the incident and calls out an apology to Molly. Angela and Gordon warn him off; to their consternation, Molly leaves with Teddy, though she warns him that it is not a reconciliation. She is only returning to the house, not to their relationship. At the same time, Angela berates Gordon for not sticking up more for his sister.

At a bar, Gordon tells a friend that he wants Teddy dead. His friend suggests a friend-of-a-friend, an ex-convict, may be willing to take the job cheap. Gordon does not answer, and instead suggests they return to work. There, at a supermarket, he runs into Teddy and Molly, who did not realize he had exchanged shifts. After apologizing for his behavior, Teddy gives Gordon the opportunity to throw a punch at him. Gordon awkwardly declines and once again tells his friend how he wishes Teddy were dead. His friend offers to get the ex-con's number, and Gordon noncommittally agrees. At their house, Angela again berates Gordon for not being assertive enough to ask for better pay.

At their house, Molly insists that Teddy move out, though she agrees to give him a chance to make amends in the form of a dinner date the following day. She chooses a local restaurant, and they run into several of their friends, who are too embarrassed to comment on her battered appearance. When Gordon receives the ex-con's phone number from his friend, he learns that the man, Howard, lives in Mississippi. Howard insists that Gordon drive from Pennsylvania to his house to discuss the matter. When Gordon arrives, Howard forces him to strip naked to prove he is not wired and accepts the job.

As they drive back, Gordon becomes increasingly worried about Howard's violent temperament and begins to have second thoughts. At a roadside diner, Howard murders two people and tells Gordon that he will take his money one way or the other, but it's too late to back out of paying him. After taunting Gordon with threats to murder him, Howard expounds on his philosophy: he sees his actions as affecting the survivors more than his victims, as the living are the ones who must deal with the grief of loss. Meanwhile, Teddy and Molly slowly reconcile, and Molly allows him to move back into their house.

Gordon returns to Pennsylvania in time to join Teddy, Molly, and Angela for dinner. The gathering is a disaster; after a cold reception, Angela demands that Teddy leave. When Molly defends him, she and her mother tell each other off. Teddy and Molly return to their house, where they have sex, and Molly presents Teddy with his missing wedding band. As Teddy gratefully accepts it, he asks if she minds if he has a beer. Molly agrees that it is harmless, and as he drinks it, they hear a knock at the door. Howard shoots Teddy dead and walks away. Stunned, Molly runs after him and attacks him. After warning her, Howard shoots her dead, too.

After attending his sister's funeral, Gordon returns to Mississippi and confronts Howard with his mother's shotgun. Though Howard warns him that murder will change him, Gordon says that he is already living with the consequences of his actions. As Howard makes a final request, Gordon shoots and kills him.

== Cast ==
- Fran Kranz as Teddy
- Jocelin Donahue as Molly
- Kenny Wormald as Gordon
- Chris Mulkey as Howard
- Joelle Carter as Angela

== Production ==
Shooting took place at Berks and Schuylkill counties in Pennsylvania in April 2013 and lasted 25 days. The film was originally to be set in Montana and Texas, but Bryan was impressed with the locations in another low budget film shot by a friend who is a native of Schuylkill.

== Release ==
The Living premiered at the Manhattan Film Festival in July 2014. In April 2015, Montery Media gave it a limited release in the United States, where it grossed $5,514 in four theaters.

== Reception ==
Rotten Tomatoes, a review aggregator, reports that 50% of eight surveyed critics gave the film a positive review; the average rating is 5.7/10. Frank Scheck of The Hollywood Reporter wrote, "Veteran character actor Chris Mulkey makes a compelling villain in this twisty tale of revenge." Andy Webster of The New York Times wrote that the film fails to live up to its potential and treats the subject of domestic violence superficially. Katie Walsh of the Los Angeles Times wrote, "What could have been a taut and tense thriller is ankled by the inert characters, clunky screenplay and nonexistent back story." Brent Simon of Paste called it "a ridiculous misfire" that lacks nuance.
