= Center Stage: Turn It Up =

2008 American TV film

- Promotional poster
- Based on: Characters by Carol Heikkinen
- Written by: Karen Bloch Morse
- Directed by: Steven Jacobson
- Starring: Rachele Brooke Smith; Kenny Wormald; Sarah Jayne Jensen; Nicole Muñoz; Christopher Russell; Ethan Stiefel; Peter Gallagher
- Music by: Laura Karpman
- Country of origin: United States
- Original language: English

Production
- Executive producers: Greg Malcolm; Vicki Sotheran; David Blackman
- Producer: Laurence Mark
- Cinematography: Dino Parks
- Editor: Ian Slater
- Running time: 95 minutes
- Production companies: Stage 6 Films; Laurence Mark Productions

Original release
- Network: Oxygen
- Release: November 1, 2008

Center Stage: Turn It Up is a 2008 dance drama film and a sequel to Center Stage (2000). The film was directed by Steven Jacobson and written by Karen Bloch Morse. The film debuted on Oxygen on November 1, 2008.

It stars Rachele Brooke Smith as Kate Parker and Kenny Wormald as Tommy Anderson, and also features Sarah Jayne Jensen as Suzanne Von Stroh, with Peter Gallagher and Ethan Stiefel returning from the first film as Jonathan Reeves and Cooper Nielson, respectively.

The film was followed by a sequel Center Stage: On Pointe (2016).

== Plot ==
Kate Parker is saying goodbye to her friends in Detroit, Michigan and her little sister Bella because she is leaving home to go to an audition for the greatest dance school in America, the American Ballet Academy. Kate doesn't make it and instead of her Suzanne Von Stroh is chosen, because of an argument between the director of the school, Jonathan and one of the teachers, Cooper Nielson, who has returned to ABA after his ballet company lost its funding. A young dancer, Tommy Anderson, is stunned by Kate and is sure that she passed and got into the academy, but soon he discovers that she was rejected, and he is paired up with Suzanne instead. Kate, homeless in New York City, goes to a club called The Foundry where she finds Tommy and impresses both him and the owner of the club, Sal, who is Tommy's best friend, with her dance moves and energy. She is given a job at the club and sleeps in the upstairs office. Because she needs to find an apartment she agrees to help Tommy with his dance if he pays her.

Soon they start the classes, she finds an apartment, Tommy becomes a great student and is given the opportunity to dance with Suzanne for the famous choreographer Monica Straus. Meanwhile, Tommy and Kate begin to have feelings for each other and become a couple. They break up after Kate sees Tommy dance with Suzanne, for a gala, and at the end of the dance Suzanne kisses him. The next day Tommy finds Bella waiting for her at ABA and takes her to Kate. She then confesses to her sister that she was not accepted into the school. Kate decides to give up on dancing and go home to Detroit with Bella.

The next morning while waiting for the bus, Bella shows Kate a leaflet Tommy gave her, advertising an audition for "The Glass Slipper", a Broadway ballet version of Cinderella that Monica Strauss is casting. Kate decides to give her dancing dream one last shot. Kate gets into a final audition with two other girls, Suzanne being one of them, and three boys, including Tommy. Monica Strauss asks Tommy to dance with Suzanne, but he rejects her and offers the dance to Kate instead. Tommy receives the part of Prince and Kate of Cinderella.

== Cast ==
- Rachele Brooke Smith as Kate Parker
- Kenny Wormald as Tommy Anderson
- Sarah Jayne Jensen as Suzanne Von Stroh
- Nicole Muñoz as Bella Parker
- Christopher Russell as Sal
- Peter Gallagher as Jonathan Reeves
- Ethan Stiefel as Cooper Nielson
- Christian Vincent as Harris
- Daniela Dib as Allison
- Crystal Lowe as Lexi
- Lucia Walters as Monica Strauss
- Harry Shum Jr. as Club Dancer

== Production ==
The film was shot in Vancouver, BC, Canada.

== Release ==
Center Stage: Turn It Up was first broadcast in the United States on November 1, 2008, on the Oxygen Network. The DVD was released in January 2009 by Sony Pictures Home Entertainment.

== Reception ==
Rotten Tomatoes reports that 60% of 5 critics gave the film a positive review; the average rating is 4.9/10. Common Sense Media gave the film a three out of five stars, saying, "Entertaining dance-focused romance has some mature themes."

== Soundtrack ==
- Raising the Barre – Medusa
- Balloon – Sara Haze
- Give It All I've Got – Bekki Friesen
- Turn Around – Soul P
- Burnin' – Ms. Triniti
- I Ain't Goin' Nowhere – Soul P
- Num Num – The DNC
- You Should Be Gone – Christelle Radomsky
- Loosen Up – Golden ft. Sophia Shorai
- Mista Ambarosia – The Spectaculars
- Don't Sweat – Ms. Triniti
- Street Ballet – Medusa
- Paper Plane – Lucy Schwartz
- A Part in That Show – Chris Joss
- Act Like You Want It – X5 ft. Mr. Fang
- Inside Outside – Miss Eighty 6
- Swing Baby Swing – The DNC
- Nobody Hot as Me – KU
- Rainmaker – Sara Haze
- Ten Things to Prove – Amali Ward
- You Belong – The Skies Of America
- 24 – Jem
