= Kenny Wormald =

American actor

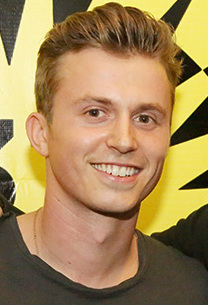
- Wormald in March 2014
- Education: Stoughton High School
- Occupations: Dancer, actor, choreographer, producer
- Spouse: Daniela DeSilva (2014-2015) Lauren Bennett (?-2026, her death)
- Children: 1

Kenny Wormald is an American dancer, reality television star and actor. He played Ren McCormack in the 2011 remake of 1984's Footloose. Wormald was a regular on the MTV reality television series Dancelife in 2007.

== Early life ==
Wormald is the son of Melanie and Edgar K. Wormald. He grew up in Stoughton, Massachusetts, where he graduated from Stoughton High School in 2002. He has two brothers, Lee and Dylan. He moved to Los Angeles right after his high school graduation.

== Acting career ==
In January 2004, Wormald starred as a dancer in the movie You Got Served. In April 2008, Wormald was confirmed to make his Acting debut in the Oxygen cable network made-for-television film Center Stage: Turn It Up as the male lead. The film, a sequel to Center Stage, premiered in November that same year.

In June 2010, Paramount Pictures announced Wormald was cast as the protagonist in the planned remake of the dance drama film Footloose (1984). Both Zac Efron and Chace Crawford were attached to play the role of Ren McCormack but both dropped out. Filming took place in September that same year on a $24 million budget with Julianne Hough and Dennis Quaid confirmed to star. The film Footloose was released on October 14, 2011 to generally positive reviews from critics with Wormald's performance receiving mixed reviews. The film went on to gross over $62 million worldwide.

In 2012, Wormald starred in mock reality webseries Massholes. In 2013, Wormald had main role as Topher in the movie Kid Cannabis. He also played the role of Pete in the movie Cavemen. In 2014, Wormald starred as Gordan in the movie The Living. Wormald had a role as Vito Tortano in the film By The Gun, directed by James Mottern. He also played the role of Ray in the movie Lap Dance.

In 2015, Wormald starred in the short film Instagram: A Caption Story, which was released on YouTube on February 3, 2015. Also that year, Wormald played the role of Dennis Wilson in the indie movie Love & Mercy. He also starred as Chris in the horror film The Girl in the Photographs. He appeared in the music video for Mike Stud's song After Hours, which Wormald also directed.

In 2016, Wormald reprised his role as Tommy Anderson in Center Stage: On Pointe, which premiered on June 25, 2016 on Lifetime. He guest starred as Derek in Fear the Walking Dead. He starred as Erik Wildwood in the direct to video dance film Honey 3: Dare to Dance alongside Cassie Ventura. In 2017, Wormald played the role of Junior Burnside in the indie horror film Happy Hunting. He also played the role of Travis in the indie drama film High Low Forty.

== Dance career ==
He began dancing at the age of six, after his mother saw him dancing to a New Kids on the Block video. At age 13, he won the Master Dance of New England and was named the Junior Mr. Dance of New England. A year later, at age 14, he was named Teen Dancer of Boston.

At age 15, he was named Teen Mr. Dance of New England. In 1996, Wormald was selected to dance for President Bill Clinton at the White House as part of the annual Easter celebration. In 2002, he won the gold medal at the World Dance Championships in Riesa, Germany for a tap dance routine he performed.

Wormald has appeared in music videos for Madonna, Mariah Carey, Chris Brown, Christina Aguilera, Nelly Furtado, BoA and JoJo. Wormald has been a back-up dancer for both Justin Timberlake and The Pussycat Dolls tours.

In December 2006, Wormald was announced to have joined the MTV Jennifer Lopez-produced dance-oriented reality television series Dancelife which follows a group of aspiring dancers trying to make it in Hollywood.

== Personal life ==
In 2019, a daughter was born to Wormald and Lauren Bennett. Bennett, by then married to Wormald, died in 2026.

== Tours ==
- Justin Timberlake – FutureSex/LoveShow (2007)
- The Pussycat Dolls – Doll Domination Tour (2009)

== Filmography ==
Year	Film	Role	Notes
2004	You Got Served	Dancer	Uncredited
2006	Clerks II	Dancer	Uncredited
2006	Jackass Number Two	Dancer	Uncredited
2007	Dancelife	Self	2 episodes
2008	Center Stage: Turn It Up	Tommy Anderson	
2011	Footloose	Ren MacCormack	
2012–2013	Massholes	Self	22 episodes
2013	Cavemen	Pete	
2014	Kid Cannabis	Topher	
2014	The Living	Gordan	
2014	Lap Dance	Ray	
2014	By the Gun	Vito Tortano	
2015	Instagram: A Caption Story	Stuart	Short film
2015	Love & Mercy	Dennis Wilson	Also choreographer
2015	The Girl in the Photographs	Chris	
2016	Center Stage: On Pointe	Tommy Anderson	Television film
2016	Honey 3: Dare to Dance	Erik Wildwood	
2016	Fear the Walking Dead	Derek	4 episodes
2017	Happy Hunting	Junior Burnside	
2017	High Low Forty	Travis	
2022	Gasoline Alley	Dennis Bourke	
