= Palmasola =

Maximum security prison in Santa Cruz, Bolivia

Coordinates: 17°52′26″S 63°10′57″W

Centro de Rehabilitación Santa Cruz "Palmasola" is a maximum security prison in Santa Cruz, Bolivia. It is Bolivia's largest prison and holds about 8,600 prisoners. Like many prisons in Latin America, guards exhibit minimal control over what happens within the prison, leading it to being described as a "prison town". Guards instead concentrate only on securing the perimeter of the facility. According to former inmates, almost anything can be obtained in the prison, and businesses operate inside the prison to supply weapons and drugs. Prisoners of Palmasola have created an organization called the Disciplina Interna to oversee some affairs.

Under Bolivian law, children under the age of six may live in a prison with their parent. As such, Palmasola is home to a number of children. The United Nations has criticized the policy. Four out of five prisoners in Palmasola are awaiting trial. On May 11, 2012, ABC News – Nightline featured a story about American businessman Jacob Ostreicher who was held in Palmasola for 11 months without a trial.

Pope Francis visited the prison on July 10, 2015 during his papal visit to Ecuador, Bolivia, and Paraguay .

== 2013 riot ==
At approximately 6 am on August 23, 2013, a riot broke out at Palmasola when a gang living in cell block B broke a hole in the wall that separated it from cell block A, the home of a rival gang. They then used machetes, small knives, and sticks to attack their rivals, and ignited a number of propane tanks to use as flame throwers or bombs. The riot reportedly started as a battle over leadership and control of the "Chonchocorito" sector of the prison. Thirty-one people died in the riot, most of whom were burnt to death. Among the dead was an 18-month-old who was living at the prison. A further 37 inmates were seriously injured with burns over 60–90% of their bodies, and 256 were evacuated.

This was the deadliest prison riot in Bolivian history. In the aftermath of the riot, the archbishop of Santa Cruz, the local Ombudsman, and members of the National Convergence political party issued calls for reform within the prison and judicial system.

== See also ==
- San Pedro prison, also in Bolivia
