= The Last Face =

- Theatrical release poster
- Directed by: Sean Penn
- Written by: Erin Dignam
- Produced by: Bill Gerber; Matt Palmieri; Bill Pohlad
- Starring: Charlize Theron; Javier Bardem; Adèle Exarchopoulos; Jean Reno
- Cinematography: Barry Ackroyd
- Edited by: Jay Cassidy
- Music by: Hans Zimmer
- Production companies: FilmHaven Entertainment; Gerber Pictures; Matt Palmieri Productions; River Road Entertainment
- Distributed by: Saban Films (North America); Lionsgate (International)
- Release dates: May 20, 2016 (Cannes); June 29, 2017 (United States)
- Running time: 132 minutes
- Country: United States
- Language: English
- Box office: $1.2 million

The Last Face is a 2016 American drama film directed by Sean Penn and written by Erin Dignam. The film stars Charlize Theron, Javier Bardem, Adèle Exarchopoulos, and Jean Reno. It was selected to compete for the Palme d'Or at the 2016 Cannes Film Festival, debuting to generally poor reviews. The film was released on DirecTV on June 29, 2017, before being released by Saban Films on video on demand and in theaters on July 28, 2017.

== Plot ==
Wren Petersen is a physician and activist working in West Africa with the organization Doctors of the World that her late father started many years ago. She is happy to lead the organization, but frequently finds herself negatively comparing herself to her father's achievements. In 2003, Wren meets Miguel, a handsome surgeon who has also devoted himself to treating people from impoverished and war-torn sections of the world. The two fall in love but Wren soon discovers that Miguel has had a prior sexual relationship with her cousin, which contributes to the decay of their relationship.

== Cast ==
- Charlize Theron as Wren Petersen
- Javier Bardem as Miguel Leon
- Adèle Exarchopoulos as Ellen
- Jean Reno as Dr. Love
- Jared Harris as Dr. John Farber
- Sibongile Mlambo as Assatu
- Merritt Wever as Marlee

== Production ==
On April 10, 2014, it was announced Sean Penn would direct the film, with Charlize Theron and Javier Bardem set to star in the film. Principal photography began on August 1, 2014, in Cape Town.

== Release ==
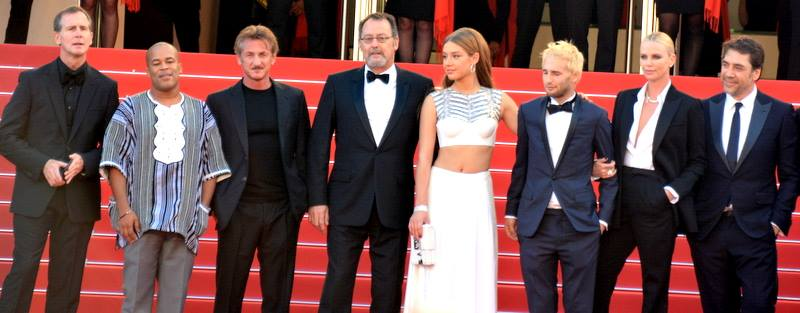
Director, producer, and stars at the Cannes Film Festival.

The film premiered at the 2016 Cannes Film Festival on May 20, 2016. On September 8, 2016, Saban Capital Group, through its Saban Films division, acquired the U.S distribution rights to the film. The film was released on DirecTV on June 29, 2017, before being released on video on demand and in theaters on July 28, 2017, by Saban Films.

== Reception ==
The reception for The Last Face at Cannes was very negative and The Sydney Morning Herald reported that the film was booed during its screening. The film holds a rating of 8% on Rotten Tomatoes, based on 49 reviews, with an average rating of 3/10. The site's critics' consensus reads: "The Last Face's noble intentions are nowhere near enough to carry a fundamentally misguided story that arguably demeans the demographic it wants to defend." On Metacritic, the film has a weighted average score of 16 out of 100, based on 20 critics, indicating "overwhelming dislike".

The Hollywood Reporter panned the film, writing "A backdrop of Third World atrocity, suffering and merciless human-rights violations serves as the canvas for a faux-profound Hollywood love story in Sean Penn's stunningly self-important but numbingly empty cocktail of romance and insulting refugee porn, The Last Face." The Guardian and The Telegraph were equally dismissive, with The Guardian commenting that "Charlize Theron and Javier Bardem give career worst performances as doctors falling in love in west Africa while black characters are relegated to the background".

== See also ==
- White savior narrative in film
