= Hurlyburly (film) =

- Film poster
- Directed by: Anthony Drazan
- Written by: David Rabe
- Produced by: Anthony Drazan; Richard N. Gladstein; Carl Colpaert
- Starring: Sean Penn; Kevin Spacey; Robin Wright Penn; Chazz Palminteri; Garry Shandling; Anna Paquin; Meg Ryan
- Cinematography: Gu Changwei
- Edited by: Dylan Tichenor
- Music by: Steve Lindsey; David Baerwald
- Production company: FilmColony
- Distributed by: Fine Line Features
- Release date: December 25, 1998
- Running time: 122 minutes
- Country: United States
- Language: English
- Budget: $4 million
- Box office: $1.8 million

Hurlyburly is a 1998 independent comedy-drama film directed by Anthony Drazan and based on the 1984 play of the same name by David Rabe, who adapted it for the screenplay. The film is about the intersecting lives of several Hollywood players and wannabes. Rabe condensed the action of his play—over 3 hours long—into two hours and updated the setting from the mid-1980s to the late 1990s.

== Plot ==
Eddie, a cocaine-addicted womanizing casting director, lives in the Hollywood Hills, where his friend Mickey has come to stay with him temporarily after a fallout with his wife. Along with their buddies, Artie and out-of-work actor Phil, Eddie and Mickey live a life of decadence and immorality. Eddie is in love with Darlene, but she is also seeing the married Mickey. Eddie comes to question his lifestyle and purpose, while Mickey is content with his situation. Through a haze of drugs and booze, the four friends inch closer to rock bottom.

== Cast ==
- Sean Penn as Eddie
- Kevin Spacey as Mickey
- Robin Wright as Darlene
- Chazz Palminteri as Phil
- Garry Shandling as Artie
- Anna Paquin as Donna
- Meg Ryan as Bonnie
- Gianna Ranaudo as Susie

== Production ==
Anthony Drazan and David Rabe said some unnamed famous actors they approached to star in the film turned them down due to the depiction of drug use. The low-budget production was able to secure financing through the sale of foreign distribution rights, in addition to the actors working for minimal salaries.

Filming took place in the Hollywood Hills from December 1997 to January 1998.

== Reception ==
=== Box office ===
Opening in 16 theaters, the film grossed $164,826 in its opening weekend; the widest release the film ever got was in 84 theaters. As the film only had a budget of $4 million, this was considered a "strong" opening for a limited release. The film grossed a total of $1,798,862.

=== Critical reception ===
Hurlyburly has a 57% approval rating on Rotten Tomatoes based on 37 reviews with an average rating of 5.7/10. The website's consensus reads: "Though Hurlyburly offers a showcase of powerhouse performances from its leads, it's held back by a meandering narrative and verbose explorations of cynicism."

Roger Ebert gave the film 3/4 stars and said Penn gives "a remarkable performance." Stephen Holden of The New York Times said, "In evoking the casual cruelty of contemporary life in a certain time and place, this screen adaptation of David Rabe's play is a misanthropic triumph." In a negative review, Edward Guthmann of the San Francisco Chronicle called the film "a misbegotten mess." Guthmann argued, "Instead of keeping the rude spirit that drove the play, Drazan takes the material too seriously and tries to refashion it as an allegory for our demoralized times -- even though, 14 years later, its observations, cultural idioms and druggie characters are all dated."

The film also attracted criticism for its depiction of women. The character of Donna (played by Anna Paquin, then 15 years old) is given as a "gift" to Eddie and Mickey from Artie. Another character, Bonnie, is treated as an object to be gifted to Phil.

=== Awards and nominations ===
At the 1998 Venice Film Festival, Penn's performance won him the Volpi Cup and Drazan was nominated for the Golden Lion. Penn was also nominated for Best Male Lead at the Independent Spirit Awards.

== Promotion ==
Sean Penn and Garry Shandling gave the film a plug during the final episode of The Larry Sanders Show. Penn, who plays himself, is on the fictitious late-night talk show to publicize Hurlyburly. "Off camera" he confidentially tells Sanders—played by Shandling, one of Penn's co-stars in the film—that Garry Shandling was an insecure, awful actor always trying to get into his wife Robin Wright Penn's trailer.
