= List of Scream Queens characters =

The following is a list of characters from Fox's black comedy slasher television series, Scream Queens, which aired from September 2015 to December 2016. Created by Ryan Murphy, Brad Falchuk, and Ian Brennan, and produced by 20th Century Fox Television and Ryan Murphy Productions, the series features an ensemble cast including Emma Roberts, Lea Michele, Jamie Lee Curtis, and others.

The first season focuses on the Kappa Kappa Tau sorority at Wallace University, led by Chanel Oberlin (Emma Roberts), as it is targeted by a serial killer who dresses in the Red Devil mascot uniform as a disguise. The second season focuses on the murder spree committed by another serial killer using a Green Meanie costume at the C.U.R.E. institute, a new hospital where Chanel and other characters work. The show blends humor with horror. It was filmed at Tulane University in New Orleans, Louisiana.

== Overview ==
Credited as main cast
Credited in more than two episodes
Credited in up to two episodes
Character does not appear in season

Portrayer	Character	Season	
Portrayer	Character	1	2
Main cast
Emma Roberts	Chanel Oberlin	Main	
Skyler Samuels	Grace Gardner	Main	
Lea Michele	Hester Ulrich / Chanel #6	Main	
Glen Powell	Chad Radwell	Main	Recurring
Diego Boneta	Pete Martinez	Main	
Abigail Breslin	Libby Putney / Chanel #5	Main	
Keke Palmer	Zayday Williams	Main	
Oliver Hudson	Wes Gardner	Main	Recurring
Nasim Pedrad	Gigi Caldwell	Main	
Lucien Laviscount	Earl Grey	Main	
Billie Lourd	Sadie Swenson / Chanel #3	Main	
Jamie Lee Curtis	Dean Cathy Munsch	Main	
Kirstie Alley	Ingrid Hoffel		Main
Taylor Lautner	Dr. Cassidy Cascade		Main
James Earl	Chamberlain Jackson		Main
John Stamos	Dr. Brock Holt		Main
Recurring cast
Niecy Nash^{1}	Denise Hemphill	Recurring	
Breezy Eslin	Jennifer	Recurring	
Jeanna Han	Sam	Recurring	
Ariana Grande^{1}	Sonya Herfmann / Chanel #2	Recurring	
Jim Klock	Detective Chisholm	Recurring	
Nick Jonas^{1}	Boone Clemens	Recurring	
Evan Paley	Caulfield Mount Herman	Recurring	
Aaron Rhodes	Roger	Recurring	
Austin Rhodes	Dodger	Recurring	
Jan Hoag	Ms Agatha Bean	Recurring	
Anna Grace Barlow	Bethany Stevens / Mary Mulligan	Recurring	
McKaley Miller	Sophia Doyle	Recurring	
Grace Phipps	Mandy Greenwell	Recurring	
Jennifer Aspen^{2}	Mandy Greenwell	Guest	
Anna Margaret Collins	Coco Cohen	Recurring	
Chelsea Ricketts	Amy Meyer	Recurring	
Trilby Glover	Jane Hollis		Recurring
Jerry O'Connell	Dr. Mike		Recurring
Laura Bell Bundy	Nurse Thomas		Recurring
Andrea Erikson Stein	Marguerite Honeywell / Chanel #7		Recurring
Riley McKenna Weinstein	Daria Janssen / Chanel #8		Recurring
Dahlya Glick	Andrea / Chanel #10		Recurring
Guest cast
Brianne Howey	Melanie Dorkus	Guest	
Jeremy Batiste	Bill Hollis		Guest
Cathy Marks	Midge / Chanel #11		Guest
Pablo Castelblanco	Tristan St. Pierre / Chanel Pour Homme		Guest
Cecily Strong	Catherine Hobart		Guest
Colton Haynes^{1}	Tyler		Guest
Kevin Bigley	Randal		Guest
Cheri Oteri	Sheila Baumgartner		Guest
Brian Baumgartner	Richard		Guest
Alec Mapa	Lynn Johnstone		Guest
Ivar Brogger	Mitch Mitchum		Guest
Mary Birdsong	Penelope Hotchkiss		Guest
Moira O'Neill	Addison / Chanel #9		Guest
Brooke Shields	Dr. Scarlett Lovin		Guest

Notes

- ^1 Niecy Nash, Ariana Grande, Nick Jonas, and Colton Haynes are credited as Special Guest Stars in their respective seasons.
- ^2 Jennifer Aspen portrays Mandy as an adult in one episode.

== Main characters ==
=== Chanel Oberlin ===
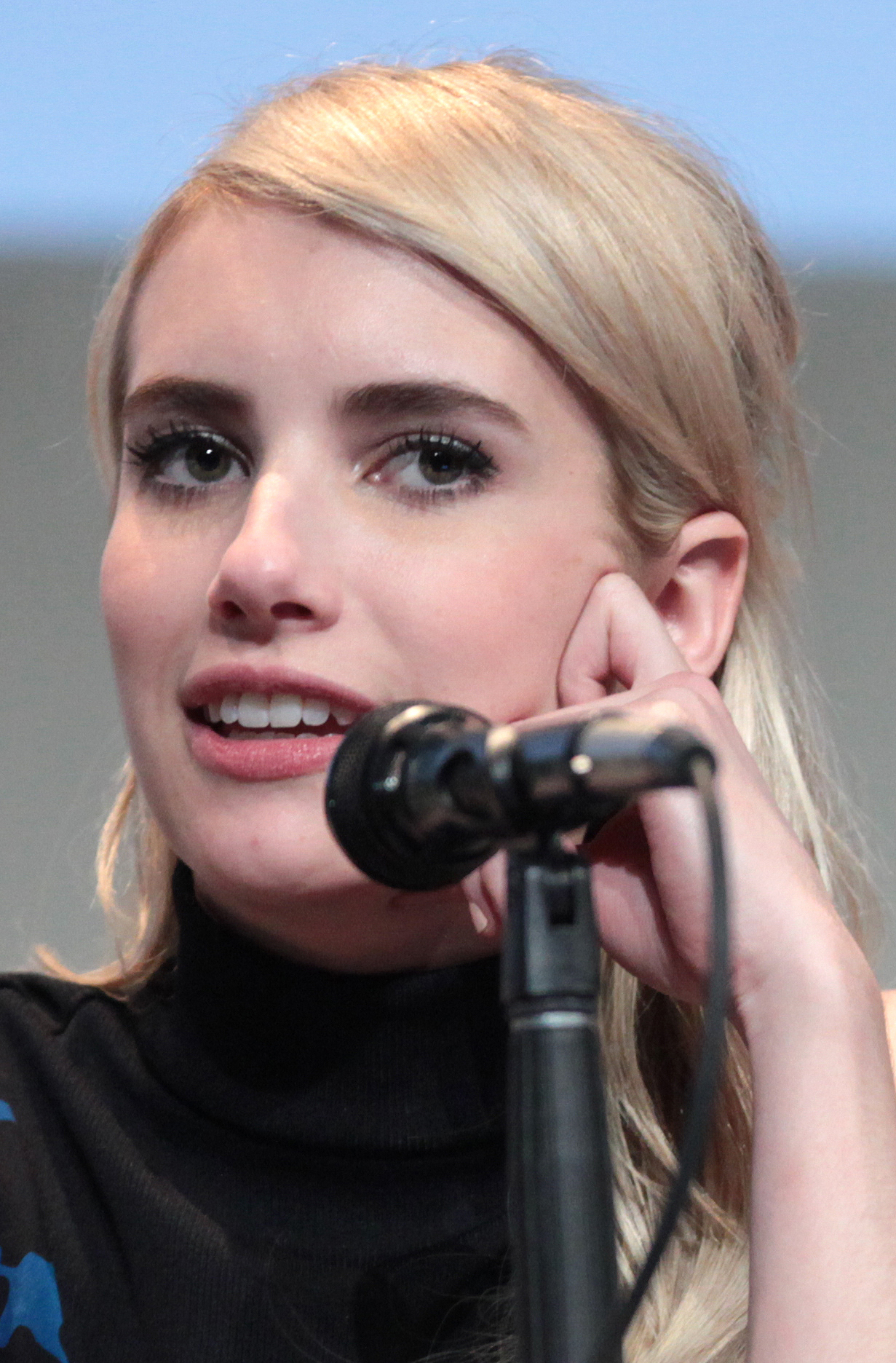
Chanel Oberlin is portrayed by Emma Roberts.

==== Season One ====
Chanel Oberlin (Emma Roberts) is an egotistical and sociopathic president of Kappa Kappa Tau at Wallace University. She is suspected of burning her predecessor, Melanie Dorkus, after filling her spray tan tank with hydrochloric acid in retribution for her abuse. Her cruel attitude and entitled personality, coupled with decades of shady activities within the sorority, lead the Dean, Cathy Munsch, to revoke the charter. However, Gigi intervenes, and Chanel is horrified when she is forced to accept anyone who wishes to join Kappa, causing all the other sisters and potential pledges, aside from her minions known as the Chanels, to leave.

She is the on-and-off girlfriend of Chad Radwell, the head of the Dickie Dollar Scholars fraternity. She harbors hatred toward Chanel #5 and often insults her. She also becomes suspicious of Hester, who had undergone a major makeover to become Chanel #6. She was sent to prison after Chanel #5, under the control of Hester, turned her in for the incident involving Ms. Bean, who was unintentionally murdered by Chanel in a prank gone wrong.

She harbors anger towards Grace and Zayday after the latter runs for the presidency of Kappa Kappa Tau. The two are forced to become co-presidents after the votes tie. Chanel then reveals that she deliberately wanted Zayday to become president to save herself from becoming a target of the Red Devil. She and the Chanels plan to expose Grace and Zayday, as she believes they are working with the Red Devil. Meanwhile, the other Chanels plan to murder Chanel out of fear that she is the killer, which she reluctantly forgives them for.

During her quest to prove that Grace is one of the killers, she uncovers information about the true identity of Grace's mother and cruelly reveals it to her. However, she later apologizes and admits that she has an abusive mother herself.

In "Black Friday", Chanel and her Chanels have an encounter with the Red Devil while shopping during the Black Friday sale. When Chanel is cornered by the Red Devil, Chanel is maimed with an arrow before Denise Hemphill arrives, revealing that she is now the head of the police. After recovering, Chanel assumes that Dean Munsch is the Red Devil and plans with the Chanels and Zayday (and initially Grace, before being persuaded otherwise by Pete) to do away with her. However, all of her attempts are unfounded, including her last effort to drown her, which is foiled. When she writes a long and cruel missive to the other Chanels because of their failure to help her in her last attempt to kill the Dean, the media takes hold of the said letter which ruins her reputation. She contemplates suicide but was convinced by Zayday to keep fighting, thus inspiring her to bounce back. Part of this is faking an apology to Melanie and attempting to kill her, as Chanel thought that Melanie was the Red Devil, before Grace reveals the Red Devil is Hester.

In "The Final Girl(s)," Chanel and the other Chanels are arrested upon Hester claiming they were behind the Red Devil killings and are sent away to Palmer Asylum. While incarcerated, Chanel rises to become asylum president. With a release from the constant pressures of society, she and the other two Chanels find happiness in their new home and even expressed not wanting to leave at all.

==== Season Two ====
In Season Two, Chanel, #3, and #5 leave the asylum after Hester confesses to her crimes due to misunderstanding how double jeopardy works. Chanel graduates from community college, becoming a phlebotomist to rehabilitate her image, as the Chanels were previously hated by the public. Disowned by her wealthy parents, she lives in a rundown apartment with #3 and #5. Cathy Munsch offers Chanel a job at the C.U.R.E Institute Hospital, where she becomes a medical student and dates Dr. Brock Holt. Chanel takes over Dr. Scarlett's show, "Lovin The D," rebranding it to "Lovin The C," with #3 as her executive producer. In the final scene, Chanel discovers an old Kappa Kappa Tau ring and encounters the Red Devil in her car, prompting a scream.

==== Reception ====
Roberts' performance has been met with positive reviews from critics. IGN stated, "Two Murphy alums, Emma Roberts and Lea Michele, continued to prove that they're great at delivering his dialogue. Roberts in particular was a standout for me, and I relished every bitchy, whiny Chanel line she would give us." The Hollywood Reporter said, of Roberts' performance, "The Scream Queens creators revel in writing mean girls, and Roberts gives gung-ho commitment to spewing the worst of Chanel's eviscerating insults — Chanel's a solipsist, so we're not supposed to quibble at how floridly racist and misogynistic she sounds — while pausing to give just enough beats of underlying humanity." Her performance has also been praised by her fellow cast members, with Jamie Lee Curtis stating "with her delivery. It's a great kind of performance, to then breed the rest of all of us into sync."

=== Denise Hemphill ===
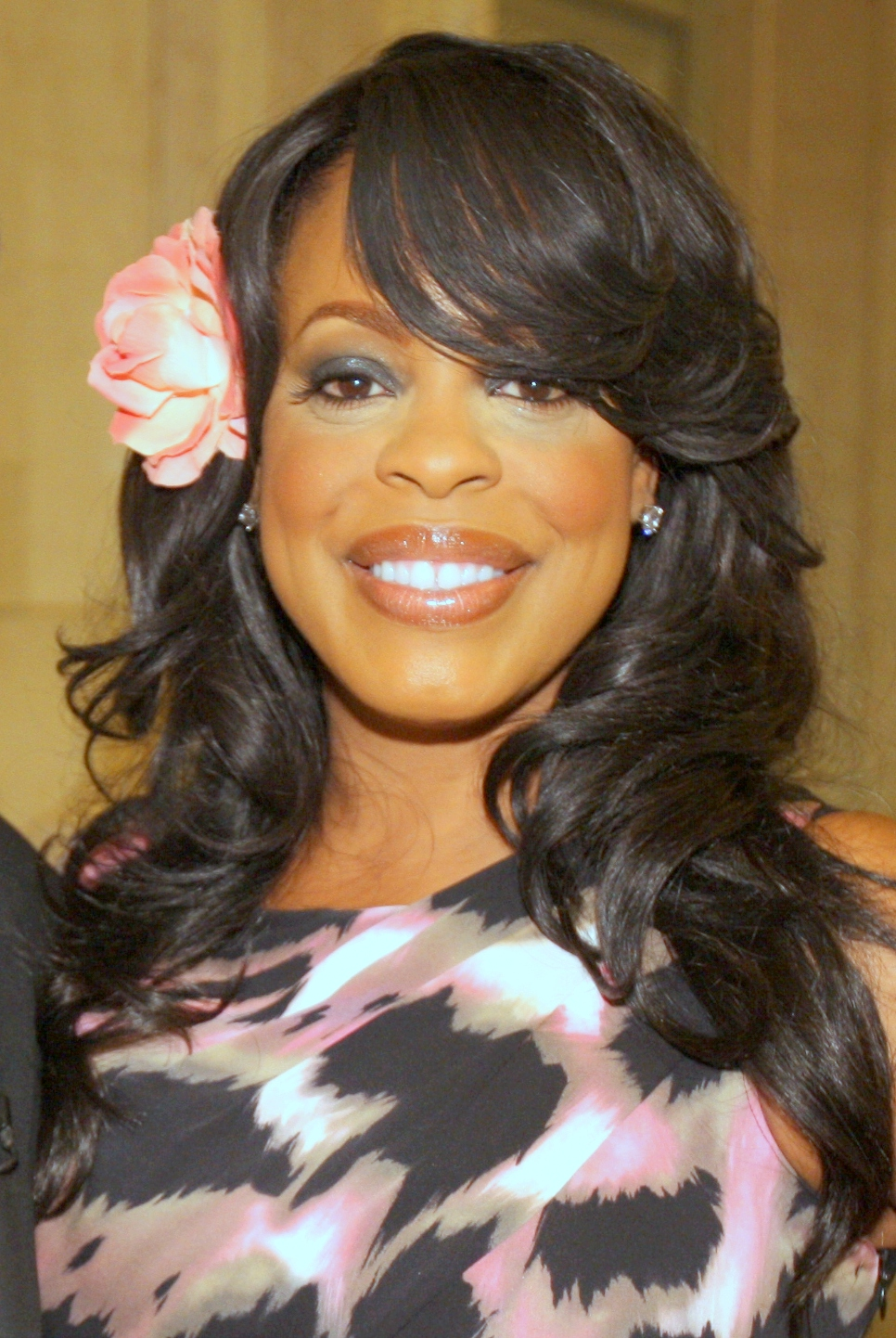
Denise Hemphill is portrayed by Niecy Nash.

Denise Hemphill (Niecy Nash) is Kappa Kappa Tau's new security guard, hired by Gigi. She is very dedicated to her job, though is somewhat incompetent. Her good friend Shondell is murdered by the Red Devil and Denise vows to find out their identity, believing that it is Zayday. Revealed in "Black Friday", when most (or all) of the police force was fired, she became the new police chief. She and two other officers corner the Red Devil who injured Chanel, she told Chanel about her promotion unintentionally allowing the Red Devil to kill one of the officers and escape.

In season two, Denise played a part in exposing Hester's confession when she played the tape at Chanels' retrial. When the Green Meanie killer starts killing the patients at the hospital Dean Munsch hires Denise to catch the killer, she also lets them visit Hester to try to find out who the killer is which she knows so they move Hester into the hospital. After Chad's death she lets Hester free to go to the Halloween party only so after she will reveal who the killer is but Hester escapes and after finding Chanel #5 stabbed, the Green Meanie throws punch on her and then electrocutes her with a defibrillator, incapacitating her, later her body would be sent into a cryogenic chamber after Dean Munsch reveals Denise still has a slight heartbeat and hopes to bring her back to life. In the finale, Nurse Hoffel turns off her machine to use the power to plant the bombs in the hospital and Denise wakes up just in time to defuse the bomb to save everyone and helps chases Nurse Hoffel into the swamp where they all agree to leave her to die in quicksand.

=== Grace Gardner ===
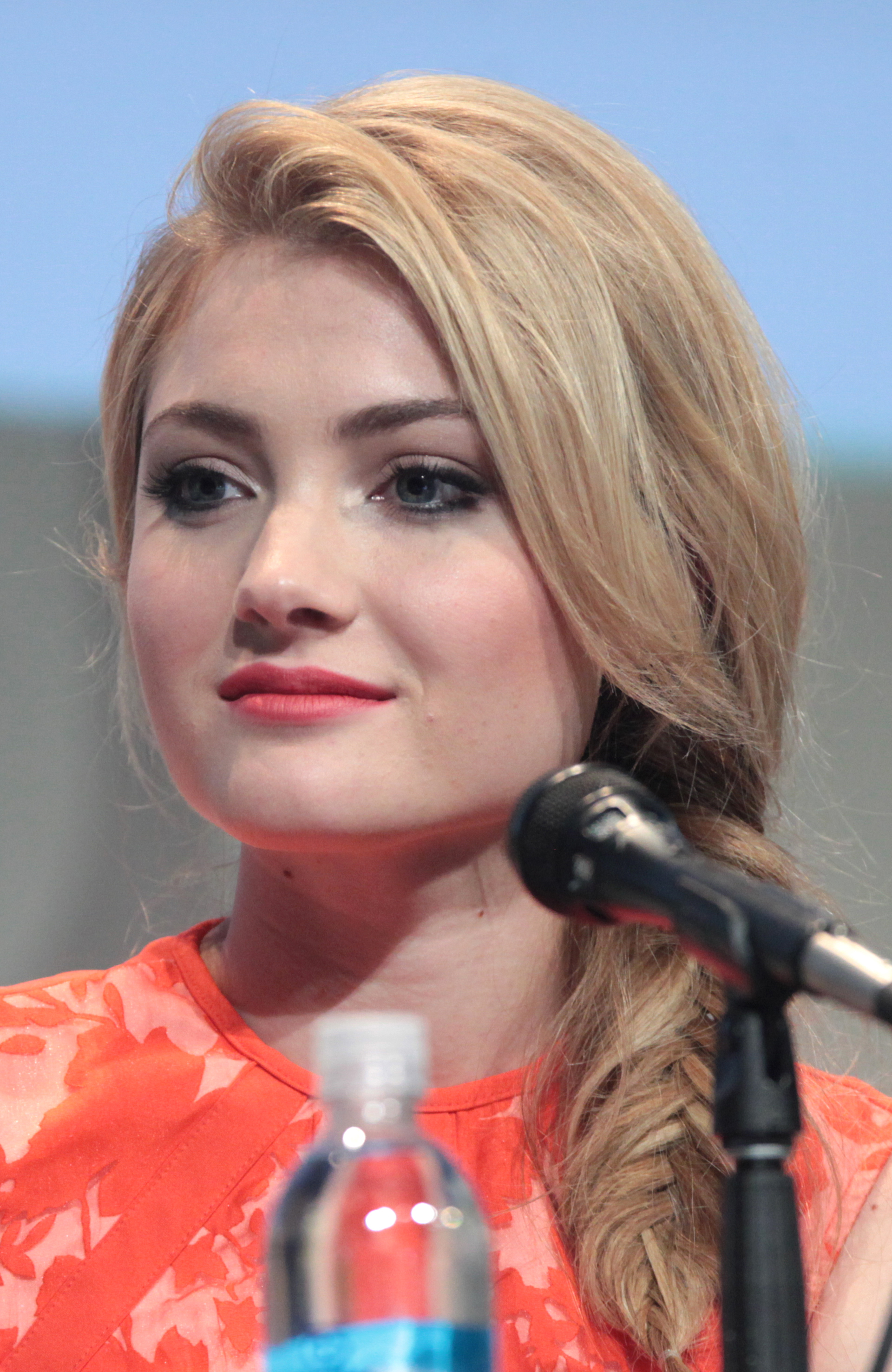
Grace Gardner is portrayed by Skyler Samuels.

Grace Gardner (Skyler Samuels) is the Kappa Kappa Tau vice president, formerly pledge, who is also legacy as her late mother Bethany Stevens was the KKT President back in 1995 and refused to help Sophia Doyle, who gave birth in a bathtub during a KKT party. She is horrified by Chanel's behaviour and the current reputation of the sorority and plans to restore Kappa to the way it used to be. She does so by working with Pete, a coffee shop barista who is a secretive investigative journalist. As well as restoring the reputation of KKT, they also are curious about revealing the Red Devil serial killer. She becomes best friends with Zayday Williams, who is also a pledge of Kappa. During Halloween, she supports Zayday's presidency and her charity haunted house she puts together, but when Zayday is kidnapped by the Red Devil, she and Pete go on a search party to find her, and after discovering the Red Devil's evil lair she notices Zayday has disappeared. She then finds Zayday back in Kappa Kappa Tau and is overjoyed when she becomes co-president of Kappa House. She displays a secret hatred toward her father's relationship with Gigi Caldwell. During her investigation, she is horrified to discover that, besides being responsible for the bathtub incident, her mother was a violent drug dealer and alcoholic, and that her father had lied to her about who her mother was. During a Thanksgiving dinner held inside the house, her father accuses her of being the killer. She is shocked, yet he reveals she was snooping around the house when Melanie Dorkus was viciously disfigured and was found by her father meeting Pete dressed in a Red Devil costume. After discovering that Wes is the father of the bathtub babies and she is the half-sister of Boone and the Red Devil, she forgives him and the two decide to catch or kill her siblings to protect each other. In the first-season finale, Grace confronts Pete as he reveals he is one of the Red Devils and killed Boone and Roger and Dodger before he exclaims that the final Red Devil is a KKT pledge causing Grace and Zayday to investigate. In the fast forward to 2016, Grace and Zayday, with Hester, now run Kappa House and have regained the honour of KKT by allowing any girl to join and host fun competitions and games instead of hazing the pledges.

Skyler Samuels did not reprise the role in the second season since she returned to Stanford University to finish her degree, which was halted when she was shooting the first season. Her character's absence was not addressed at first, but near the end of the season("Rapunzel, Rapunzel") it was revealed by Wes that after the Wallace University murders, Grace tried to have a normal life again and put on an act around her father that everything was okay. But because of the horrible trauma of the Red Devil killings and the Kappa hazing she experienced, she was said to have been driven to insanity and she ended up in a mental institution in Stanford.

=== Hester Ulrich ===
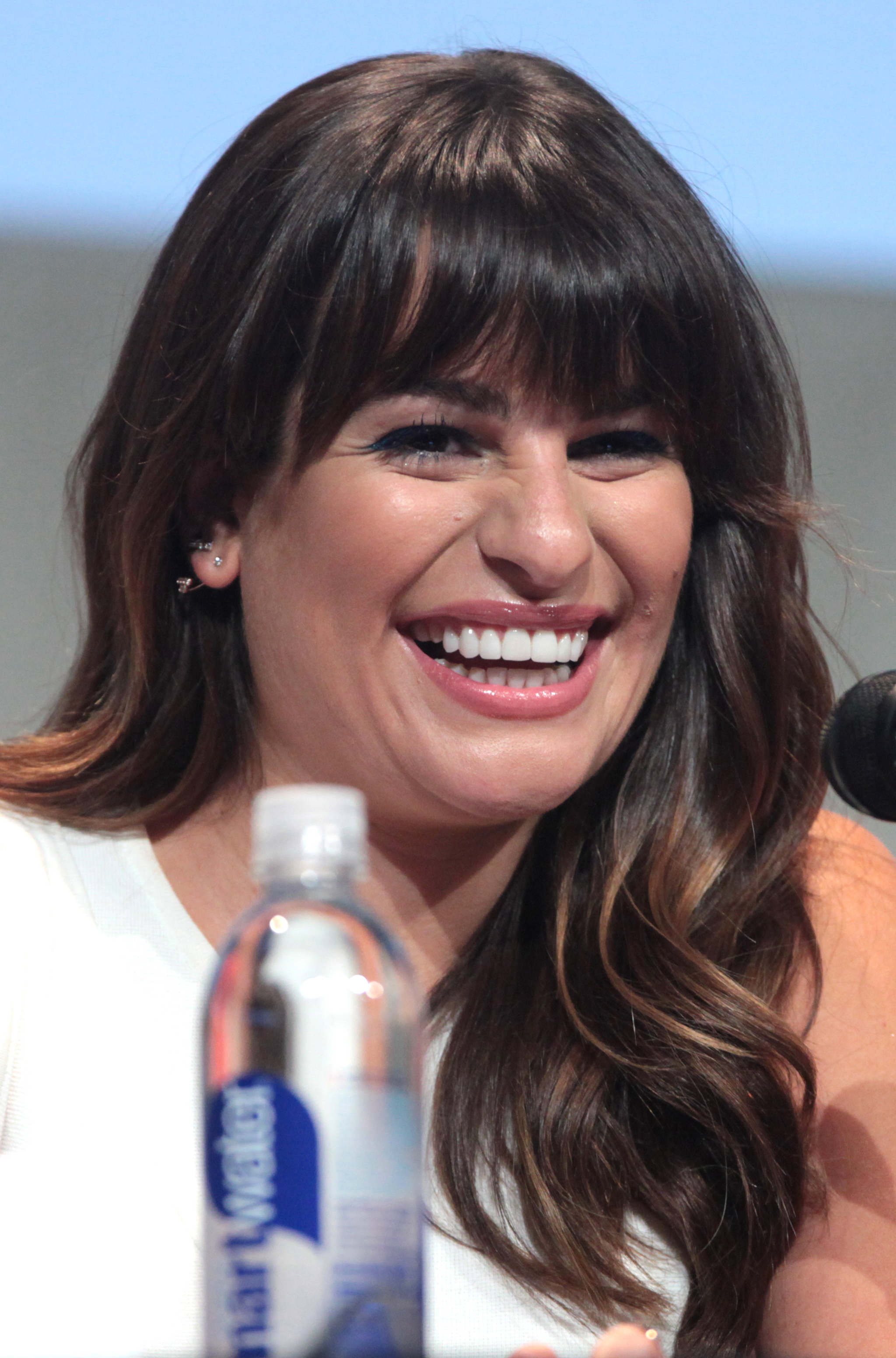
Hester Ulrich, otherwise known as "Neckbrace" or "Chanel #6", is portrayed by Lea Michele.

Hester Ulrich, also known as Chanel #6 (Lea Michele), is the main antagonist of the first season. She was born in 1995 as Hester Doyle, the daughter of Kappa pledge Sophia, who died from blood loss after giving birth in the bathtub because of the neglect of the president and her minions. She and Boone were raised in the mental asylum by a depressed Gigi who grieved for 3 years over her sister Amy's suicide but improved and taught the children how to be serial killers so that they can conduct their 20-year long plan for revenge against Kappa Kappa Tau. She stole an asylum patient's neck brace for her disguise. She got into Wallace University by Cathy Munsch, who accepted her fake background high school information. She refers to herself as the brains of the operation and Boone as the muscle and both poured hydrochloric acid in Melanie Dorkus's tanning spray hoping it would drive Chanel over the edge to be a scapegoat by vilifying her and she turned on the deep fryer machine that burnt Ms Bean's face off. In the pilot episode, she is nicknamed "Neckbrace" by Chanel Oberlin and witnesses the death of Ms Bean and Tiffany "Deaf Taylor Swift". She has an obsession with death, which is shown when she gives several ways to dispose of Chanel #2's body. In "Chainsaw" she snoops around Chanel's closet before being caught by the President, who completely transforms her into Chanel #6 and removes the neck brace, horrifying #5. Hester's plan comes to light when she announces her pregnancy to Chanel, who is furious once she learns it was fake and that Chad will still get her pregnant anyway. Chanel snaps and pushes Hester, causing her to slip and fall down the Kappa staircase, breaking her neck, supposedly killing her, but she returns alive at the Radwell's Thanksgiving dinner where she is insulted by his family causing her and Chanel to make amends with one another after Chanel stands up to Chad and his family and both leave. She takes part in the Black Friday doorbuster but is trapped alongside the other Chanels. She, #3 and #5 escape while Chanel is shot in the chest. Hester joins the plan to kill Dean Munsch. In "The Final Girl(s)" she stabs herself with a high heel in the eye and blames it on Chanel #5, causing her to wear an eyepatch. She frames the Chanels for the Red Devil murders.

In 2016, she is the treasurer of Kappa House and while polishing a memorial for the kids who were killed, Cathy confronts Hester about her being the killer and threatens to turn her in to the police. Hester threatens Cathy in return with the cover-up of Sophia Doyle back in 1995 and the murder of her ex-husband. The Dean back out with her plan and continued with their happy lives.

In season two, Hester later confesses her crimes and is incarcerated while the Chanels are acquitted at their retrial. It is not known how the police found out that it was Hester. The Chanels, Munch, and Hemphill visit Hester at the federal asylum, to get clues about the murders at the hospital and points out about knowing who the killer is. However, she wants a transfer to the hospital and gets discontinued beauty products in exchange for the information. When another patient is killed by the Green Meanie, Denise transfers her to the hospital, but Hester refuses to tell them who the killer is. Hester wants to attend the Halloween party at the hospital, but Cathy and Denise refuse. However, after the Green Meanie attacks Denise, she lets Hester out on Halloween to go to the party, but Hester escapes and tries to kill Chanel by dressing up as Ivanka Trump.

Following Denise's death, Hester is reinstated into the Chanels. After the Season 2 finale, Hester steals all of Dean Munch's money and buys Blood Island with Dr Brock as they both live. They plan to kill tourists who crash their boats onto the island.

=== Chad Radwell ===
Chad Radwell (Glen Powell) was an egotistical, idiotic, sexually engaged and shallow president of the Dickie Dollar Scholars fraternity and the on and off boyfriend of Chanel Oberlin. He is a necrophiliac and shares this with Chanel, who feels differently about the matter. However, he eventually finds a relationship with Hester, who has a mutual feeling on the matter. Eventually, he returns to Chanel and makes a vow to be monogamous to her. He has also had affairs and relationships with Dean Munsch, Denise Hemphill, Chanel #2, Chanel #3, and Chanel #5. He becomes angry at the police for doing nothing, as they refuse to believe there is a serial killer on the loose, following the supposed murder of his best friend, Boone Clemmens. He initially wants to stop the Red Devil but becomes too cowardly to do so after most of his frat brothers are killed. On "Thanksgiving" he takes Chanel to meet his family at the Hamptons, but they are revealed to be incredibly arrogant, cruel, and very outspoken about not accepting her, which he does not realize. In the first-season finale, he opens up a charity in memory of his deceased frat brothers and begins a love affair with Denise which ends briefly, after she leaves for a police operation in Quantico.

Chad makes his return in the second season and it is revealed that it was him who snuck into the asylum with the Red Devil costume on, at the ending of season one, to jokingly scare Chanel. He came to the hospital to get Chanel back since he found out about her and the Chanels being innocent. He begins to clash with Brock to see who Chanel wants the most. He then proposes to Chanel who accepts his offer, but as Chanel walks down the aisle she notices blood dripping from the ceiling and Chad's dead body falls from above.

=== Pete Martinez ===
Pete Martinez (Diego Boneta) was the ambitious school newspaper writer and one of the Red Devil killers. He refers to himself as an "investigative reporter" and often spies on Kappa House and Chanel who had previously got a restraining order against him. He is introduced in the pilot episode working at the school coffee shop where he feuds with Chanel over her complex Pumpkin Spice Latte order and later meets Grace who takes a liking towards her and after she announces her pledging Kappa Kappa Tau, he warns her not to join but she does anyway. She turns to him after witnessing Ms Bean's death and suggests working together to restore Kappa's honour while studying the identity of the 1995 bathtub babies. In "Black Friday" he confesses to being a murderer to a horrified Grace who wants to take the relationship to the next level. In "Dorkus" it is revealed that he caught Boone undressing from the Red Devil costume and he manipulated Pete into joining him to kill the Kappa girls. He also reveals that had shot Roger in the head with a nail gun during the Kappa slumber party and that he joined forces with Boone to take down Gigi but ended up stabbing Boone in the chest, killing him. He also confesses to killing Dodger and injuring Chanel at the mall by shooting a crossbow through Chanel, who thought that the Devil was Dean Munsch. He also explains that he got the DNA of all the Chanels and knows who the female killer is. While finishing his sentence, he is stabbed through the chest by Hester in the Red Devil outfit before he can reveal the baby's identity and dies.

=== Chanel #5 ===
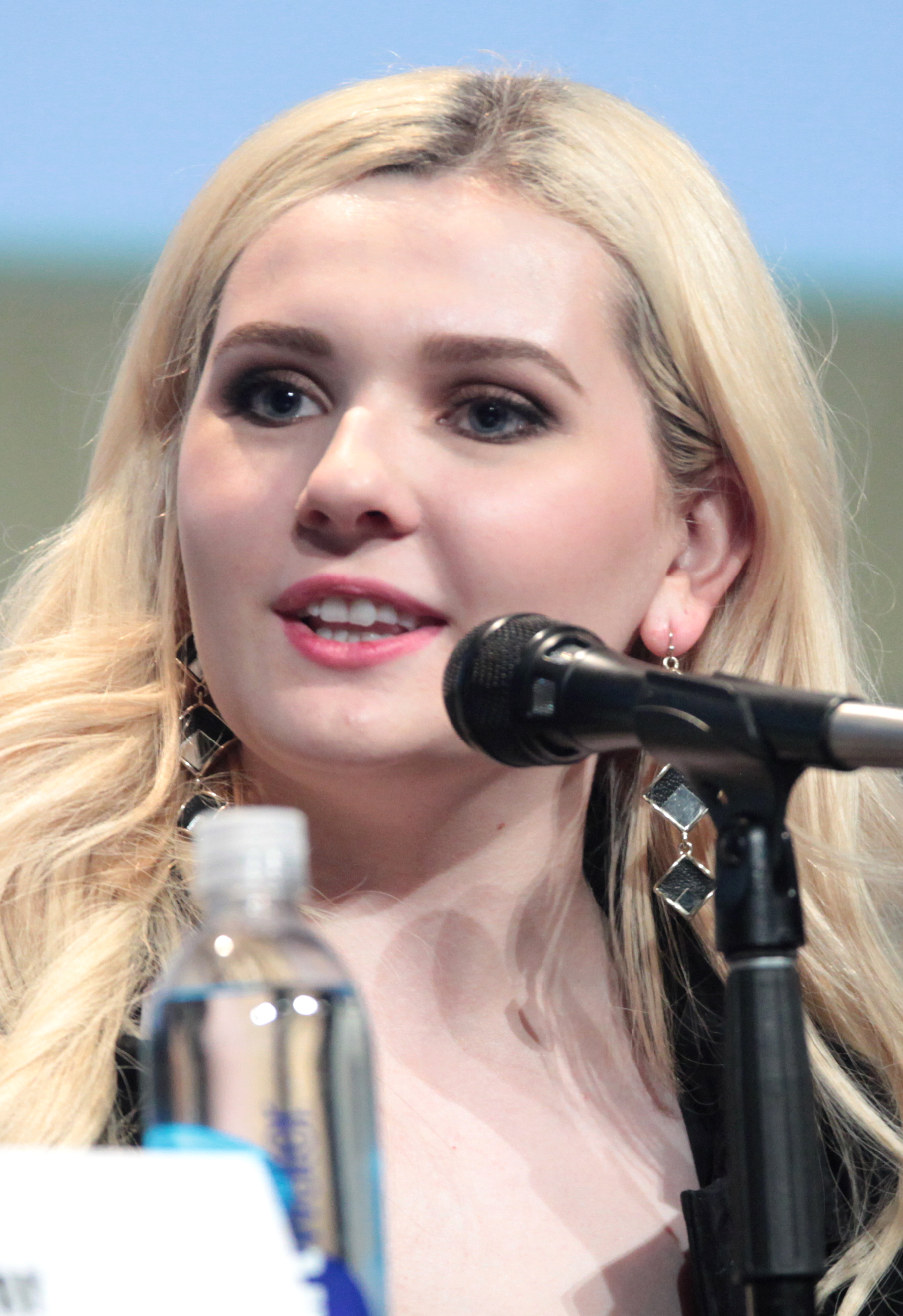
Libby Putney, better known as "Chanel #5", is portrayed by Abigail Breslin.

Libby Putney (Abigail Breslin), better known as Chanel #5 and the right-hand woman to Chanel Oberlin. She seems to be Chanel #3's closest friend in season one and then later Zayday Williams's closest friend in season 2. She is emotionally unstable and easily traumatized especially when her boyfriends Roger and Dodger are killed which she witnesses and the blow up of the pizza delivery guy dressed up as the Red Devil in "Dorkus". She is the subject of Chanel's insults and often threatens to leave the sorority but never follows through. During Halloween, Chanel #5 and Hester develop a plan to destroy Chanel and do so by turning her in to the police for the murder of Ms Bean but Hester defends herself and the Chanels by giving false information that Chanel #5 turned her leader in even though it was Chanel #6. She is confronted by Chanel who threatens to kill her and sends her and her boyfriends out on Halloween night to light all the jack o lanterns for the pumpkin patch party. However, Chanel #5, Roger and Dodger are chased by the Red Devil into the Shining replica maze where Dodger is murdered and the two escape alive. Later, at the Kappa slumber party, she makes out with Roger who is shot through the head with a nail gun, devastating Chanel #5. It is revealed that she, Chanel #3 and Hester were planning to kill Chanel after a Ouija board reading by Chanel #2 that Chanel was the murderer.

In "The Final Girl(s)", she and the other Chanels are arrested for the Red Devil killings by Hester (who is the Red Devil herself and the bathtub baby). Instead of being sent to prison, Chanel, Chanel #3 and Chanel #5 are sent to the Palmer Asylum (where Gigi raised Hester and Boone to be serial killers). It is revealed that Chanel #5 was given medications by the asylum doctors that transformed her so much that she became Chanel's best friend.

After Hester confesses to her crimes, the Chanels are acquitted. After graduating from Elmwood Community College with a degree in communications, Chanel #5 becomes a dental assistant where she lives in a run-down apartment with Chanel and Chanel #3 after the three of them have been disowned by their wealthy parents. It is revealed that since they were freed from the asylum, she is off her meds that Chanel goes back into hating her again, in a much worse treatment. This time Chanel #3 joining forces with Chanel in running the hate on Chanel #5. The three of them are approached by Cathy Munsch to work at C.U.R.E. Institute Hospital. They accept the offer. She bonds and has a crush on a patient named Tyler, whose death made her traumatized and emotional again. Later, she was almost killed by the Green Meanie, but was able to survive. At the end of the second season, Chanel #5 and Zayday both stay at the C.U.R.E Institute and become doctors.

=== Zayday Williams ===
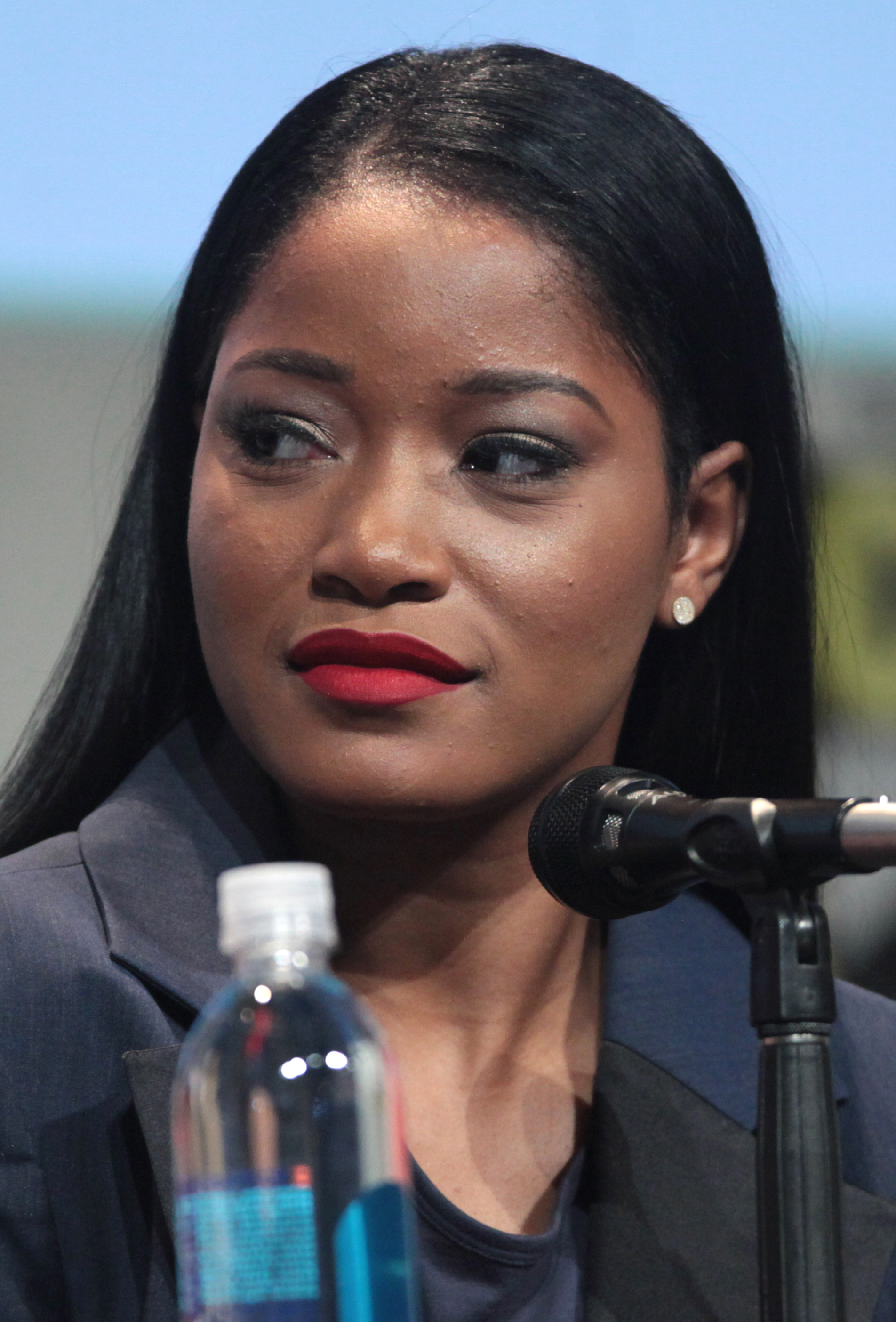
Zayday Williams is portrayed by Keke Palmer.

Zayday Williams (Keke Palmer) is the Kappa Kappa Tau president, formerly pledge, and Grace's best friend. Zayday has a genius IQ and got a scholarship to attend Wallace University. With Grace's support, she announces that she is going to run for president of Kappa Kappa Tau, and shortly after, ends up being kidnapped by the Red Devil, whom she believes is in love with her. Despite this, Denise remains hellbent on the fact that Zayday is the Red Devil after finding incriminating evidence such as a chainsaw under her bed, and tweets regarding murder. After a tied election orchestrated by Chanel, Zayday and Chanel become co-presidents of Kappa. She was in a relationship with a Dickie Dollar Scholars member Earl Grey before he was murdered by Boone, as one of the Red Devils who is revealed to be the one who kidnapped her. Zayday, with the help of Grace, discovered that he faked his death and was one of the killers. She was convinced by Grace to join forces with the Chanels to murder Dean Munsch, as she believes that the Dean is the red Devil. However, at the end Grace back off while Zayday sticks with the plan with the Chanels. She is appointed as the new Kappa Kappa Tau president after the Chanels got arrested, with Grace as her vice president and Hester as the treasurer.

In the second season, it is revealed that Zayday graduated from college early and was looking to go to medical school. Dean Munch offers her a job as a medical student at the C.U.R.E. Institute Hospital, which she accepts. When Zayday gets closer to who the Green Meanie killer is, she is taken hostage by Jane Hollis who is the mother of Cassidy and the one who has planned the killings at the C.U.R.E. Institute. After Cassidy refuses to kill for her anymore, Jane visits Zayday in the hole she has her in and she manages to convince her to change her mind about shutting down the hospital. After the deaths of Jane, Cassidy and Nurse Hoffel, Zayday and Chanel #5 stay at the C.U.R.E. Institute and become doctors.

=== Wes Gardner ===
Weston "Wes" Gardner (Oliver Hudson) was Grace's widowed father, who becomes a professor at Wallace University after the murders on campus. He began a relationship with Gigi Caldwell and eventually became engaged to her until her death. He married Bethany Stevens after the 1995 incident where a set of twin babies were born in a bathtub. Wes is later revealed to be the father of the bathtub babies, Hester and Boone. In the first season finale, "The Final Girl(s)", Wes is in a serious relationship with Dean Munsch for a while until she broke up with him and he was later diagnosed with a disease that causes him to eat his hair. He visits C.U.R.E hoping to win Cathy back. However, it is revealed that he is the third and final Green Meanie killer. He reveals to Chamberlain that he blames Cathy and the Chanels for ruining both his and Grace's life before he stabs him to death. He takes credit for the deaths of Sheila, Chad, Chamberlain, the attack on Chanel #5 and Denise, and the poisoning of the Halloween party. He also kills Chanel #7 and Scarlett Lovin. After teaming up with Hester, Cassidy and Nurse Hoffel in a plan to kill the Chanels, he convinces Cassidy to help kill Nurse Hoffel who is in charge of killing Chanel but they both turn on him and he is forced to jump into a tub of cooking oil and burns to death.

=== Gigi Caldwell ===
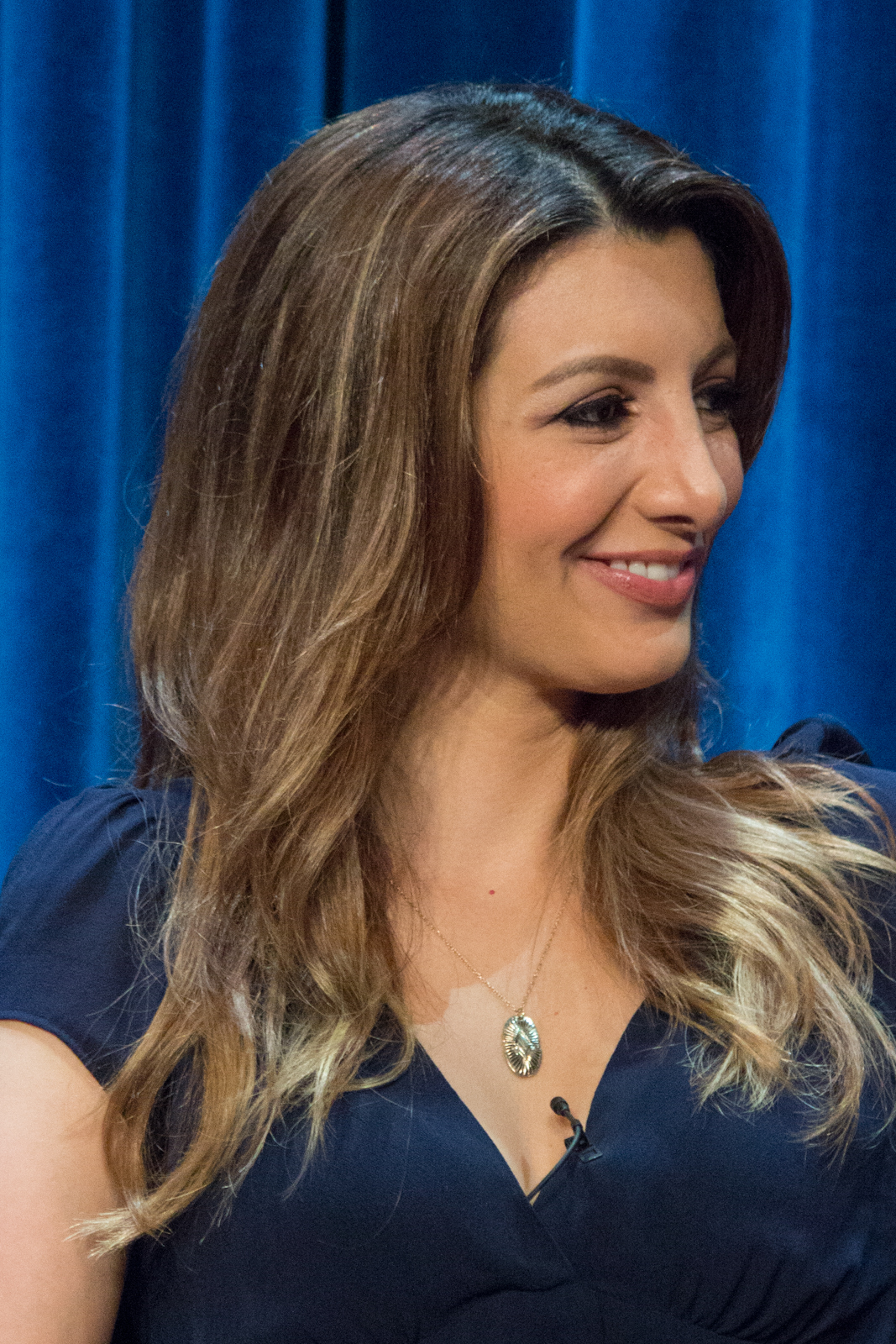
Gigi Caldwell is portrayed by Nasim Pedrad.

Gigi Caldwell, born Jess Meyer (Nasim Pedrad), was Kappa Kappa Tau's national president and the foster mother of Hester Ulrich and Boone Clemens, the bathtub babies she raised in the Palmer Asylum. Her name was originally Jess Meyer, the sister of Amy who took care of the babies but she killed herself leading to Jess taking care of them. Towards the end of 1995, she had a mental breakdown about her sister's suicide and she was sent to Palmer Asylum and grieved for three years but managed to improve and taught Hester and Boone how to be serial killers so they could conduct their revenge plan against Kappa House. Jess changed her name to Gigi Caldwell and begun a relationship with Wes Gardner. Despite her craziness, she cares about the girls especially Grace after she tasers the Red Devil in "Pumpkin Patch" who she had a secret meeting with at the end of an episode. She witnessed Pete stabbing Boone in the chest dressed as the Red Devil after she was confronted by her foster son and threatened to be killed. She died in "Thanksgiving" after the Devil (Hester) decapitates her and serves her head on the turkey platter in Kappa Kappa Tau. Her identity is revealed in the episode "Black Friday".

=== Earl Grey ===
Earl Grey (Lucien Laviscount) was a British member of the Dickie Dollar Scholars, who seemed to have a crush on Zayday and supported her presidency. He continued his relationship with Zayday, and as he was preparing to have sex with her, he was soon murdered by Boone out of jealousy, who was the second Red Devil.

=== Chanel #3 ===
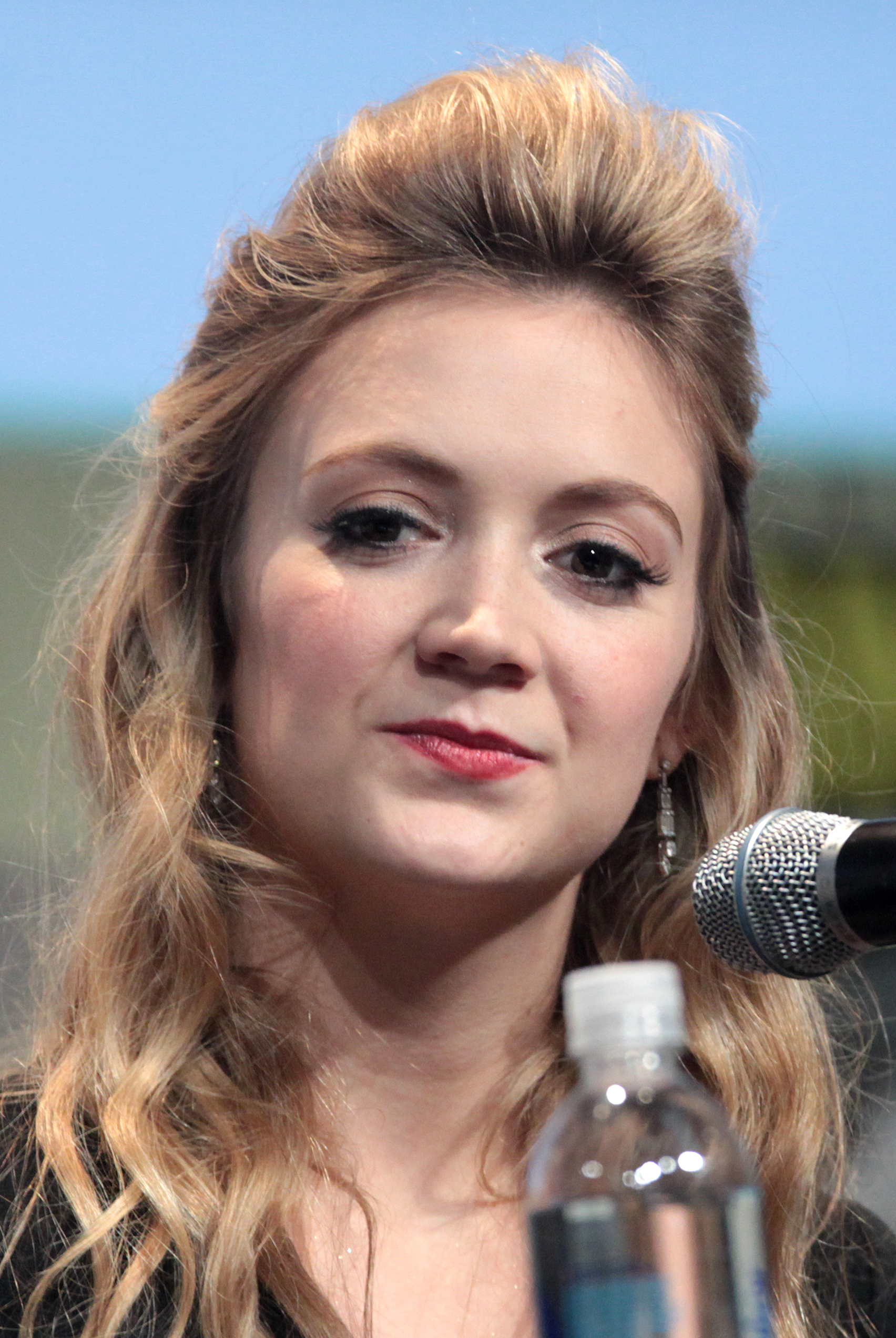
Sadie Swenson, better known as "Chanel #3", is portrayed by Billie Lourd.

Sadie Swenson (Billie Lourd) is Chanel #3 and the former second-in-command of the Chanels and one of Chanel Oberlin's minions. She is a member of Kappa Kappa Tau, and seems to be Chanel's closest friend. She reveals to Sam that she is the illegitimate daughter of infamous serial killer Charles Manson. Additionally, she reveals to Sam that her last name is Swenson and that her step-father is a billionaire. After becoming close to Sam, she begins to have confused feelings about her and tries to figure them out, but realizes that she is not a lesbian but is instead "in love with love". In "Seven Minutes in Hell," it is revealed that Chanel #3 consistently wears earmuffs because a former boyfriend became obsessed with her ears. After he was removed from Wallace, her ex-boyfriend vowed that if he ever saw her ears again, he would cut them off, causing her to develop a phobia of her ears being seen by him.

In "The Final Girl(s)", Chanel and the Chanels are framed for the Red Devil murder by Hester and are arrested. When condemned to the asylum, Chanel #3 continues to demonstrate her pansexuality and begins a relationship with one of the female nurses, mentioning that she is ready to show her ears.

After Hester confessed to her crimes, Chanel #3, Chanel, and Chanel #5 are acquitted. After graduating from Elmwood Community College, Chanel #3 works as a janitor at a sperm bank and lives in a run-down apartment with Chanel and Chanel #5 after the three of them were disowned by their wealthy parents. They are approached by Cathy Munsch to work at the C.U.R.E. Institute Hospital. The three of them accept the offer. While working at the hospital, Chanel #3 starts to fall for Dr. Cassidy and finds out that he's the Green Meanie killer but she keeps it a secret because she wants him to stop killing people. When she and him confront his mother Cassidy chooses his mother over Chanel #3. He still refuses to kill her and eventually stops killing people to be with her but when Nurse Hoffel tries to escape and throws a machete at Chanel #3, Cassidy jumps in front of her and dies. After Cassidy's death, Chanel #3 becomes an executive producer for Chanel's new show Lovin The C.

=== Dean Cathy Munsch ===
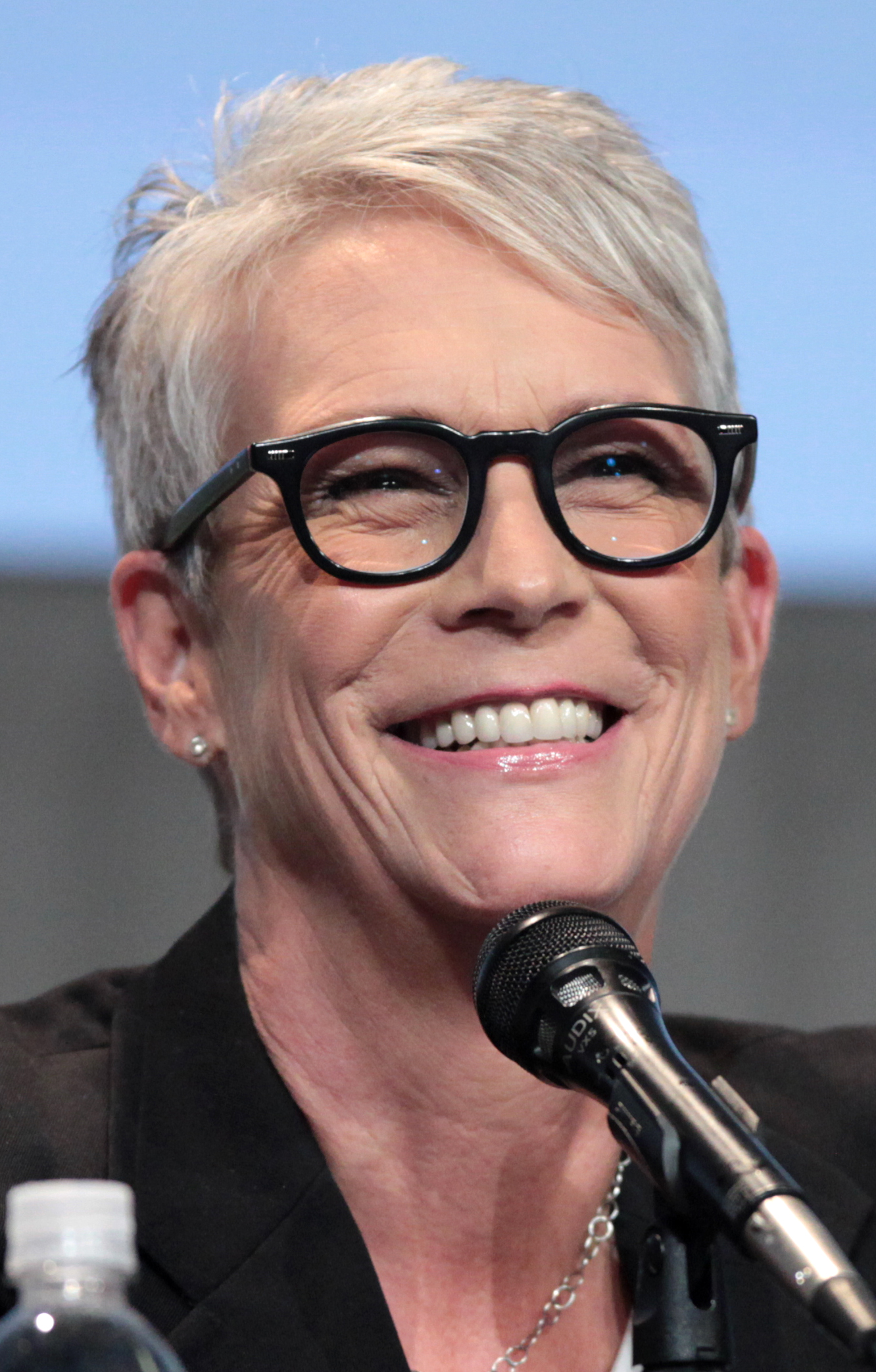
Cathy Munsch is portrayed by Jamie Lee Curtis.

Cathy Munsch (Jamie Lee Curtis) is the seductive and manipulative dean of Wallace University, who hates Kappa Kappa Tau and Chanel Oberlin causing her to threaten to revoke its charter. She covered the bathtub baby incident at Kappa House in 1995 by driving Bethany, Mandy and Coco in the middle of nowhere and burying Sophia Doyle's body before telling the girls to leave school immediately. It is revealed that she knew the bathtub babies's identity which she confessed to Hester (who was the female baby and the Red Devil) and threatens to turn her in to the police.

She despises Gigi Caldwell who has a relationship with Wes but after Gigi's death, Cathy falls in love with Wes. She also hates Feather McCarthy, a former student who had an affair with Cathy's husband causing Cathy to go insane and kicked her husband out the house and often dressed up in Feather's clothes and terrorised her, managing to kick Feather out of Kappa House. Cathy later killed and dismembered her ex-husband but put the blame on Feather who was sent to an asylum for life.

In 2016, Cathy confronts Hester about her being the killer and threatens to turn her in to the police while Hester also threatens to turn Cathy in to the police for the cover up of Sophia Doyle back in 1995 and the murder of her ex-husband. They both part ways and she continues to live a happy life with the horrors of last fall behind Wallace University and Hester herself.

In the second season, Cathy has left the University and has started the C.U.R.E. Institute Hospital. She recruits Zayday, Chanel, Chanel #5, and Chanel #3 to work for her. Not long after that, the patients at the C.U.R.E. Institute Hospital are killed by the Green Meanie. The real reason she opened the hospital was because she claims to have suffering from a disease, which Zayday diagnoses as Kuru, which is caused by cannibalism. Her publicist had mistakenly booked her flight to Papua New Guinea and a stranger invited her to a funeral and ate a deceased man's brain, without realizing it. Zayday indicates that she has about a year to live, and decides to keep it a secret. Cathy's illness becomes more serious and she will die within a month. Dr. Brock asks for her hand in marriage in order for him and Hester to steal her money. However, Chanel #5 checks her tests and does not believe she has Kuru. They perform a surgery to test if she has Kuru, which concludes that she does not. All of her symptoms were caused by extreme dehydration resulting from never drinking water, only scotch. She finds out that the brain she had eaten in Papua New Guinea was lamb, not human. After the deaths of Jane Hollis, Cassidy and Nurse Hoffel, Cathy's money gets stolen by Hester and Dr. Brock, but she ends up selling the hospital for a huge profit and becomes a sex therapist for women over 50.

=== Ingrid Hoffel ===
Ingrid Marie Bean Hoffel (Kirstie Alley) is the main antagonist of the second season. Ingrid is the C.U.R.E. Institute's Head of Administration, who has a hatred towards the Chanels. She also targets other members of the staff, listening in on Munsch's conversation and later blackmailing her with it after Munsch attempts to fire her. It is then later revealed that she is the sister of Ms Agatha Bean, whom the Chanels murdered in the previous season, and that she took her position at the C.U.R.E Institute to seek revenge out on the Chanels for murdering her sister. She confronts the Green Meanie and discovers that he is Cassidy Cascade. She then offers to become the brains of the operation, with him as her muscle, and she becomes the Green Meanie, along with him. After becoming the Green Meanie, Ingrid kills Chanel #9, Chanel #10 and Slade Hornborn. She tries to push forward her revenge against the Chanels by making them work the night shift, while she and Cassidy show up as the Green Meanies. However, Wes also shows up and the plan fails. Hester decides that they need to have a Green Meanie summit and Ingrid admits whom she killed. They then must decide who gets to murder the Chanels and the consensus is for Ingrid, much to Wes's anger. He attempts to betray Hoffel, recruiting Cassidy to help, but Ingrid and Cassidy decide to turn on him instead and attempt to murder him, but he ends up committing suicide instead, leaving Ingrid and Cassidy to finish the job. After Cassidy leaves the operation, Ingrid becomes the sole Green Meanie and devises a plan to blow the hospital up using a fertilizer bomb. She locks the staff in the basement and holds them at gunpoint, explaining her motives and identity. She then shoots Jane and leaves. However, Denise Hemphill manages to defuse the bomb and they all chase Ingrid outside. She throws a machete into Cassidy and kills him and then runs off while being chased by everyone into the swamp. She falls into the quicksand and everyone decide to leave her to drown despite her plea to be rescued. Dean Munsch briefly tries to help her by handing a stick but when the stick fell off the dean did not bother doing anything further, leaving her drowning.

=== Dr. Cassidy Cascade ===
Dr. Cassidy Cascade (Taylor Lautner) was a doctor who suffers from a strange medical condition, which makes his body temperature low. He becomes involved with Chanel #3, and tells her that he believes that he died from choking on his own vomit after a party, and that he became a doctor to help him discover why he is still on Earth. In "Chanel Pour Homme-Icide," it is revealed that he is the baby of Bill and Jane Hollis. He is revealed to be the Green Meanie in "Blood Drive" and is confronted by Ingrid Hoffel, who offers to become the brains of the operation with him as the muscle. He accepts and gives her a Green Meanie costume, forming their alliance. However, after dating Chanel #3 he has a change of heart and tries not to kill anymore to be with her but in the Season 2 finale when everyone chases Nurse Hoffel into the swamp she throws a machete at Chanel #3 but Cassidy jumps in front of her and dies in her arms.

=== Chamberlain Jackson ===
Chamberlain Jackson (James Earl) was a main character in the second season. He was considered to be the cheer-up for the incurable patients. He and Zayday teamed up to unmask the Green Meanie killer. He confronts Wes Gardner who stabs him to death after he confesses to being the killer.

=== Dr. Brock Holt ===
Dr. Brock Holt (John Stamos) is the brilliant but secretive head surgeon in the C.U.R.E Institute. He was the first recipient of a hand transplant, which tends to move on its own.

He lost his original hand after the power at his house went off while washing dishes during a Super Bowl party. Shortly after washing the dishes, his ring slipped off of his finger and fell inside the garbage disposal, while his friend was flipping switches. When the power came back on, the garbage disposal was turned on, slicing Brock's hand off. His hand belonged to a squash player who murdered all of his opponents when they lost.

He starts a relationship with Chanel Oberlin which starts a rivalry between him and Chad Radwell, her ex-boyfriend. After Chad's death, he starts to have feelings for both Dean Munch and Chanel but afterwards his hand starts to make him do crazy things to get him to start killing but with the help of Cathy and Chanel he is able to keep it under control. In the Season 2 finale he and Hester plan to steal all of Dean Munch's money by having Brock marry her so when she dies he and Hester will run away together but after Cathy finds out she does not have Kuru she will live. After the deaths of Jane Hollis, Cassidy, and Nurse Hoffel, Hester steals all of Cathy's money and runs away with Brock and they both buy Blood Island which they plan to kill tourists who crash their boats.

== Recurring characters ==
=== Chanel #2 ===
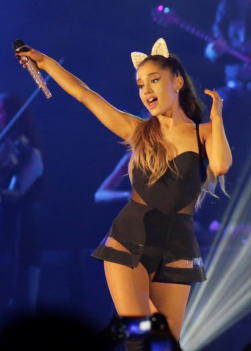
Chanel #2 is portrayed by Ariana Grande.

Sonya Herfmann (Ariana Grande), better known as Chanel #2, was one of Chanel Oberlin's minions before her death. She was involved in a relationship with Chad Radwell, unknown to Chanel until episode "Beware of Young Girls", and had a drinking problem. She is worried about the death of Ms Bean and decides to leave and go home. While she is packing in her room, the Red Devil begins texting her and eventually stabs her in the shoulder and back. Her body is discovered and hidden in the meat locker by the other Chanels, but is later taken by the Red Devil. Chanel #2's corpse is found in the Haunted House and taken in by the police. Chanel #2's parents are joyful over the news and go on vacation, leaving Chanel #2's funeral and cremation up to Chanel.

After giving a scathing eulogy at her open-casket funeral, Chanel uses a Ouija board along with the other Chanels to communicate with Chanel #2, successfully. She tells them that Chad is cheating and the killer is Chanel. Later, Chanel has a dream of Chanel #2 visiting her as a ghost and tells her that she is burning in Hell and needs to make up with Chanel so she can make it to Heaven. She does so and says that she only said those things because of her anger. She also informs Chanel of the Chanels' plan to kill her.

=== Boone Clemens ===
Boone Clemens (Nick Jonas) was a member of the Dicky Dollar Scholars and Hester's twin brother. One of the babies in the bathtub, his mother Sophia Doyle gave birth to him and his sister in 1995, but bled to death due to the neglect of her sorority sisters. He and his sister Hester were raised in an asylum by their aunt/foster mother, Gigi (known as Jess Meyer during that time). He was raised solely to enact revenge on Kappa Kappa Tau for his mother's death. Boone went undercover at Wallace University as a gay student one year before his sister arrived, and managed to join the Dickie Dollar Scholars despite never actually having enrolled in the school. While working out, he encountered the Red Devil who seemingly slit his throat. However, in "Ghost Stories" he is revealed to have faked his death, disguising himself as Joaquin Phoenix to avoid detection. He later arrives at Gigi's hotel room, confronting her with plans to kill her, but he is stopped when the Red Devil (Pete) appears and stabs him in the chest. In his role as the Red Devil, he has killed Tiffany "Deaf Taylor Swift", Chanel #2, Jennifer, Caulfield, Earl, Coney, Mandy, Sam, Dodger, Shondell and the Truck Driver who warned Chanel #5 that the killer was in the back of her car. He also worked with Hester to pour hydrochloric acid into Melanie Dorkus's spray tan.

=== Jennifer ===
Jennifer (Breezy Eslin) was a candle vlogger who pledges Kappa Kappa Tau. She is obsessed with candles and has a large ant farm, which she describes as an ant family. She works with Hester/Chanel #6 in a plot against Chanel. In "Mommie Dearest" while hosting her YouTube web show, she is stabbed through the skull by the Red Devil and dies while the camera is recording. She is found by the Chanels and Denise, her corpse covered with wax. Her death causes Dean Munsch to close down the campus and the students host a candlelight memorial.

=== Sam ===
Sam (Jeanna Han) was a lesbian Kappa Kappa Tau pledge. She is nicknamed "Predatory Lez" by Chanel and in the third episode "Chainsaw" she befriends Chanel #3 who spills a family secret to Sam that her real father is actually murderer Charles Manson, and also how her step-father is a billionaire. She is killed in the Kappa slumber party after revealing Chanel #3's biological father, Charles Manson, who all accuse her of being the Red Devil. In anger, Chanel #3 dares Sam to take a nap in the bloody bathtub in the basement. While there, she is knocked over the head by Boone in the Red Devil costume who kills her by suffocating her after Sam finds out his identity.

=== Agatha Bean ===
Ms Agatha Bean (Jan Hoag) was Kappa Kappa Tau's maid, whom was involved in the cover up of the death 20 years ago. She is constantly bullied by Chanel. Chanel's minions report that in Ms Bean's room there is a hate collage of her. Chanel becomes enraged and pushes Ms Beans head into the unused fryer, which burns her face off. Chanel then blackmails all of the pledges to not say a word and they all take her body to the meat locker. When Chad and Hester go to the house on Shady Lane, they find the bodies of the murder victims (including Ms Bean), and Hester puts her finger through Ms Beans leg. It is revealed in the second season, that her sister is Ingrid Marie Hoffel who has been planning revenge against the Chanels for Agatha's death.

=== Roger and Dodger ===
Roger and Dodger (Aaron and Austin Rhodes) were twin members of the Dickie Dollar Scholars. They are friends with Chad Radwell and involved in a relationship with Chanel #5. Although they maintained a threeway relationship with her, they ultimately made Chanel #5 choose one of them when they are trapped in Chanel's maze. She went on with Roger. Dodger is murdered by the Red Devil in the maze, while Roger escapes with Chanel #5. In the following episode, he admits to #5 that he is happy that his twin died so he did not have to share everything anymore, only to be killed by being shot several times with a nail gun by the Red Devil.

=== Caulfield ===
Caulfield Mount Herman (Evan Paley) was a member of the Dickie Dollar Scholars. He is friends with Chad and fiercely loyal to him. He attempts to help out Chad during a Red Devil attack and gets his arms sawed off. Caulfield survives the attack, only to later have his head chopped off by the Red Devil.

=== Detective Chisolm ===
Detective Chisolm (Jim Klock) is the detective hired, by Dean Munsch, to investigate to the Kappa Kappa Tau murders occurring at Wallace University. He was sexually manipulated by Dean Munch to deny the fact that there was a serial killer on the loose and refused to do a full-scale investigation, but was eventually fired by Munsch due to his incompetence as a detective.

=== Sophia Doyle ===
Sophia Doyle (McKaley Miller) was a member of Kappa Kappa Tau in 1995. She was a normal sorority student alongside her friends Bethany, Amy, Coco and Mandy. In 1995, she got impregnated by Wes Gardner with twins who she gave birth to at a party. She died of blood loss due to the neglect of her sisters who refused to help them. Fearful of the consequences, her sisters and Dean Munsch cover up her death and her children. Her son Boone Clemens and her daughter Hester Ulrich are raised at a mental institution and later become the Red Devil killer 20 years later.

=== Bethany Stevens ===
Bethany Stevens, born Mary Mulligan (Anna Grace Barlow), was the mean-spirited KKT President back in 1995 and Grace's mother. She is classified as the ringleader of the incident at Kappa House in 1995, as she forced her friends, Coco and Mandy, to leave Sophia Doyle to die after giving birth in the bathtub. It is revealed that she hooked up with Wes Gardner and almost nine months later, had Grace and changed her name to Mary Mulligan. She was arrested for shoplifting, arson, driving while intoxicated and drugs, causing Wes to sue for custody of Grace and he won. Mary then died a year later in a drunk driving car accident.

=== Mandy Greenwell ===
Mandy Greenwell (Grace Phipps as young Mandy, Jennifer Aspen as adult Mandy) was a member of Kappa Kappa Tau in 1995. After the incident at the Kappa House in 1995, Mandy goes into hiding until she is tracked down by Grace and Pete. After answering questions for them, Mandy is murdered by the Red Devil.

=== Coco Cohen ===
Coco Cohen (Anna Margaret Collins) was a member of Kappa Kappa Tau in 1995 and one of Bethany Stevens's friends. It was implied that she became an anchor at Fox News, therefore making her the only 1995 Kappa girl alive and well after Mandy's death.

=== Amy Meyer ===
Amy Meyer (Chelsea Ricketts) was a member of Kappa Kappa Tau in 1995. Amy helps Sophia after she gives birth in the bathtub and stays with her while the other sisters go and dance. It is later revealed that she is actually Gigi's sister, and killed herself after taking the babies.

=== Shondell Washington ===
Shondell Washington (Deneen Tyler) was one of the security guards hired by Gigi to protect the KKT Sorority, and Denise's best friend. She is killed by the Red Devil after falling asleep in the security car when Denise went to check on the Kappas. It is because of her death that Denise hates the Red Devil and wants to see the killer put to justice. Shondell's body was first found by Chad and Hester and later found by Grace, Pete, Zayday, and Earl during the Halloween party, along with the other bodies, which people thought were props.

=== Melanie Dorkus ===
Melanie Dorkus (Brianne Howey) was once a student at Wallace University and the previous president of Kappa Kappa Tau. Melanie had a group of minions, which Chanel Oberlin was a part of, and was preparing for her minions to spray tan her one day. Chanel messed up Melanie's dry cleaning order and she got angry. She started to tell Chanel how she could never be president of Kappa because of her looks and sensitivity and ordered Chanel to leave. Her minions began using the spray tan machine and it suddenly begins burning and tearing her skin, mainly the stomach area. It is revealed that the Red Devil poured hydrochloric acid in the tanning machine unbeknownst to anyone. Chanel then goes to Melanie's house (in the episode Dorkus) with #3 to 'apologize', when actually she accuses Melanie of being the killer (although Hester framed her) and attacks her with a pair of scissors. Grace tells Chanel that Hester is the real killer and Chanel says 'So sorry...' to Melanie. During the time at Melanie's house, Chanel and #3 compare Melanie to deformed monsters (like Jason Voorhees and Freddy Krueger).

=== Tiffany de Salle ===
Tiffany de Salle (Whitney Meyer) Tiffany was a Kappa Kappa Tau pledge. She is introduced by Chanel with the nickname, "Deaf Taylor Swift" due to her hearing disabilities along with her love for Taylor Swift. Tiffany, along with the other new pledges, later witnesses Chanel's accidental murder of Ms Bean and screams in horror at the scene. Blackmailed by the promise of handsome boyfriends and a trip to Cancun from Chanel, she agrees to lie to the police if Grace ever decided to call the police about the deadly incident and later helps hide Ms Bean's body in a freezer. After "Hell Week" starts for the new pledges, Tiffany, along with the other new pledges, is seen buried in the ground with only her head showing by Chanel #3 and Chanel #5. The Red Devil later appears with a lawnmower and drives towards the girls. Since she is deaf, Tiffany doesn't notice that the rest of the girls are screaming (she thinks they are singing a Taylor Swift song) until it is too late, and she ends up getting her head mowed off by the Red Devil.

=== Feather McCarthy ===
Feather McCarthy (Tavi Gevinson) is an ex-member of Kappa Kappa Tau, who stole Dean Cathy Munsch's husband and was targeted by Cathy until she found Professor Munsch's severed head in a fish tank where she was arrested for and taken to the mental asylum, but Cathy had killed him and blamed the death on Feather in revenge.

=== Nurse Thomas ===
Nurse Thomas (Laura Bell Bundy) was a nurse at the hospital formerly known as Our Lady of Perpetual Suffering. She was involved in the death of Bill Hollis back in 1985 when she and Dr. Mike sedated and dumped his body in the toxic swamp so they wouldn't have to miss the festivities. Afterwards, she started a relationship with Dr. Mike and both made an appearance at the Halloween party in 1986 where she was murdered by the Green Meanie after witnessing her boyfriend's death and tried to warn everyone but ended up having a knife thrown into her back, killing her before the Green Meanie went on a massacre. Her death and the massacre was orchestrated by Jane Hollis.

=== Andrea ===
Andrea (Dahlya Glick), better known as Chanel #10, was hired by Cathy Munsch to work at the C.U.R.E Institute as a Nurse and Chanel. As the Green Meanie attacks grew, Chanel, #3 and #5 decided they needed new Chanels for the Green Meanie to target instead of them. They hire three new Chanels and Cathy gets the idea to recruit three more, one being Andrea, who is assigned #10. Chanel #10 was born with extra intestines, which is how she was discovered by Cathy. Nurse Ingrid Hoffel, one of the Green Meanies, decides to annoy Dr. Brock Holt enough to make him kill Chanel. She decides to do so by helping to be sure he has to perform a surgery that he is very nervous about. Nurse Hoffel discovers that they need a heart for the surgery and suits up in her Green Meanie costume. Chanel #10 is working late shift and talking to her mom, when Nurse Hoffel comes up behind her and chokes her with her headphones. She is declared braindead and they pull her plug, using her heart for the surgery, as she is a donor. Later, Ingrid takes credit for the murder at the Green Meanie summit.

=== Addison ===
Addison (Moira O'Neill), better known as Chanel #9, was a medical student at the C.U.R.E. Institute. She was hired by Cathy to act as one of the Chanels. She is insanely scared of needles and thus refuses to donate her blood during the blood drive. Chanel convinces her and straps her down to prepare to draw her blood. Chanel leaves the room for a moment and the Green Meanie comes in to kill her. Nurse Ingrid Hoffel interrupts him and he reveals himself as Cassidy Cascade. Ingrid offers him a partnership and he accepts and together they kill Chanel #9, draining her of her blood. Ingrid and Cassidy later take credit for her murder during the Green Meanie summit.

== Antagonists ==
=== Red Devil ===
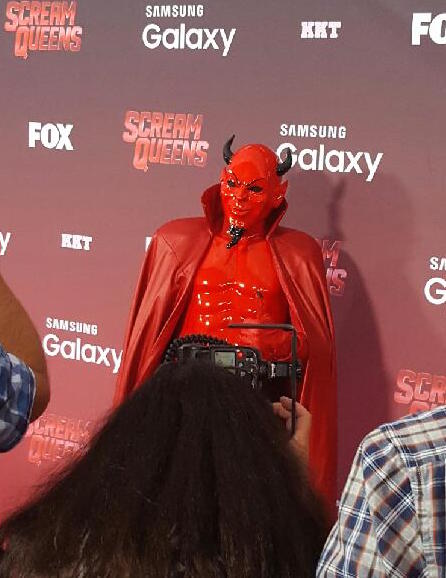
Riley Schmidt as the Red Devil at the LA Premiere of Scream Queens.

The Red Devil (stunt performed by Riley Schmidt and Olga Wilhelmine) is the main antagonist of Season 1.

The Red Devil was the mascot of Wallace University until it was changed due to its association with the killings on campus. The Devils are both the children of the deceased Sophia Doyle: her son Boone Clemens and her daughter Hester Ulrich (as well as Pete Martinez (who would assist)) who were both raised by Gigi Caldwell/Jess Meyer in a mental asylum after the shocking suicide of their former guardian Amy. Throughout their time at the institution, the two were taught about murder and orchestrated a 20 year long killing plan against Kappa House. To not be suspected, the two went under disguises: Hester as a girl with severe scoliosis and had to wear a neck brace whilst Boone pretended to be gay and never enrolled at the school whilst his sister managed to get herself in due to her "neck deformity" and managed to find the costume who they stole of a mascot who was stabbed to death by Gigi. It is revealed that Hester mostly orchestrated the murders and Boone executed the killings.

On March 25, 2014, Hester and Boone (under the Red Devil costume) broke into Kappa and put hydrochloric acid in Melanie Dorkus' tanning spray which resulted in her being disfigured and the incident being blamed on Chanel Oberlin who rose to power as president and would later be framed by Hester alongside her minions for the Red Devil murders once the plan was complete and throughout the events, carefully put together evidence to frame them successfully. The killer first makes an appearance when The Red Devil (Boone) appears and kills Chanel #2 before going off to kill Tiffany, Shondell, Coney, Mandy, Dodger, Caulfield, Sam, Jennifer, Earl Grey and a random truck driver, kidnapping Zayday and recruiting Pete (who joined to find out about Hester's identity and killed Roger and a mall cop) to help him kill Gigi who constantly pressured Hester to get rid of her brother due to the sloppy kidnapping incident. However, Boone was fatally stabbed by Pete (who wanted to finish the murder spree) and died.

After her brother's murder, Hester started to don the costume and decapitated Gigi, stabbed Pete and forced a pizza delivery man to blow up Kappa which resulted in his death. It is also revealed that Hester turned on the fryer that resulted in Ms Bean's death. Her identity was revealed to Zayday and Grace who confronted her however she was found with a stiletto in her eye and blamed #5 before later defending herself by hiring a married couple to say that they are her real parents, even her real parents (Sophia Doyle and Wes Gardner) weren't on her record. The Chanels were successfully arrested for the murders and sent to the same asylum that Hester and Boone grew up. Hester, now as the only survivor of the Red Devil team, ends her plan for revenge and the Red Devil conspiracy in January 2016. At the asylum, Chanel is awoken by a knife wielding Red Devil who was revealed to be her ex-boyfriend Chad Radwell who dresses as the Devil to scare Chanel inside the hospital. After the Green Meanie killers are killed and everyone's lives return to normal and Chanel is leaving her TV show studio a Red Devil is seen waiting in the backseat of her car.

=== Green Meanie ===
The Green Meanie (stunt performed by Riley Schmidt) is the main antagonist of Season 2. The costume consists of green clothing and a monstrous horned mask. The Green Meanie is historically described by some kids in an old legend to be a swamp monster that resided in the toxic swamp near the C.U.R.E. Institute Hospital.

The Green Meanie killer wears the costume worn by Dr. Mike on the night of October 31, 1985 where he and Nurse Thomas dumped a patient's body in the toxic swamp so they could not miss out on the Halloween party that was occurring upstairs. However, the patient's wife, Jane, orchestrated a Halloween massacre which occurred a year later, in 1986. She sent her brother (who later died in a car accident years later) to the hospital to kill everyone, including Dr. Mike and Nurse Thomas.

30 years later, the Green Meanie sneaks into the C.U.R.E. Institute Hospital and mostly kills people during the graveyard shift. The killer murders Catherine Hobart by decapitating her and then kills Tyler by burning his eyes with a laser (which was intended to be used to get rid of his warts) and slitting his throat during the surgery. He also attacks Cathy Munsch. However, she manages to defeat the killer and before she can take off the mask, the Green Meanie is scared away by the presence of Chanel #3 and Cassidy Cascade. The Green Meanie also kills Chad's friend Randal by slashing his chest and killing him (off-screen) and later the new cured patient Sheila by decapitating her with a machete and also injuries Chamberlain but does not hurt Zayday at all. Then not long after kills Chad Radwell by slashing his throat and hiding his body at the church which later falls down in front of Chanel at their wedding. Afterwards the Green Meanie later attacks Denise, however she is able to beat the killer and tries to shoot him but the killer escapes and later the Green Meanie stabs Chanel #5 in the back and when Denise comes to help the killer throws punch on her and electrocutes her with a defibrillator which kills her.

The Green Meanie is revealed to be Cassidy Cascade, who is the baby of Bill and Jane Hollis. Nurse Ingrid Hoffel, who is actually the sister of Agatha Bean, discovers this and confronts Cassidy about his role as the Green Meanie and offers to become the brains of the operation, while he is the muscle. He accepts and they kill Chanel #9 together. In the ending, he gives her a Green Meanie costume of her own and they stroll down the hall together in costume. However, he reveals that there is another Green Meanie, who is unrelated to Cassidy and Ingrid's killings. The third killer is revealed to be Wes Gardner who is plotting revenge on the Chanels after Grace was sent to a mental institution due to the trauma of the Red Devil killings and the Kappa hazing she experienced while at Wallace University. He began killing after Cassidy did, believing that his murders would just be blamed on the others.

The three killers attack the Chanels at the hospital at night and fail to kill them but finally meet one another. Hester then arranges a Green Meanie summit, where they admit who killed who and arrange who will kill who next. Cassidy admits to killing Catherine Hobart, Tyler, Randal, The Halloween patients, Chanel Pour Homme, Chanel #11, and Chanel #9. Ingrid admits to killing Chanel #9, Chanel #10, and Slade Hornborn. Wes admits to killing Sheila Baumgartner, Chad Radwell, attacking Denise and Chanel #5, poisoning the Halloween party, and killing Chamberlain. Hoffel is granted the opportunity to kill Chanel and Cassidy gets Chanel #3, while Wes is giving everyone else on the list. However, Hoffel and Cassidy decide to betray Wes and he ends up frying in the Hydrotherapy tub filled with oil.

After he and Ingrid attempt to kill Chanel and Chanel #3, Cassidy decides to no longer kill and gives the Green Meanie identity fully to Ingrid. After a talk with Chanel #8, Ingrid devises a plan to blow up the hospital using a fertilizer bomb. Jane offers her assistance to Ingrid after disowning Cassidy, but Ingrid refuses. Nurse Hoffel gets the staff members down to the basement where her bomb is and locks them up, holding them at gunpoint. She reveals her true identity as Ms Bean's sister and the Green Meanie but is interrupted by Jane and Zayday. Jane attempts to convince her to reform like she did but Ingrid instead shoots Jane and leaves them there to die until Denise (who was revealed to have survived the electrocution) shows up and defuses the bomb. They all band together and chase Ingrid outside, where she throws a machete (which was intended for Chanel #3) into Cassidy, killing him. She runs off into the swamp but ends up falling into quicksand before she can escape. They all vote to leave her there, but Cathy decides to come back for her. She tries to pull her out, but fails and Ingrid drowns. It is at this point that the Green Meanies have all been killed and the team is now disbanded.
