= Chanel Oberlin =

Fictional character from the Fox series Scream Queens

- Scream Queens character
- Emma Roberts as Chanel Oberlin
- First appearance: "Pilot" (2015)
- Last appearance: "Drain the Swamp" (2016)
- Created by: Ryan Murphy; Brad Falchuk; Ian Brennan
- Portrayed by: Emma Roberts

In-universe information
- Gender: Female
- Titles: Chanel #1; Kappa President
- Occupation: TV Doctor; Medical student; Phlebotomist; KKT President (formerly)
- Family: "Daddy" Oberlin (father); Happy Oberlin (mother); Harvard Oberlin (brother); Muffet Oberlin (sister); Ichabod Oberlin (great-great-great-great grandfather)
- Significant others: Chad Radwell (ex-fiancé; deceased); Dr. Brock Holt (ex-boyfriend)
- Nationality: American

Chanel Oberlin is a fictional character from the Fox comedy horror series Scream Queens. The character is portrayed by actress Emma Roberts and has appeared in the series since its pilot episode. She is introduced as the rich and self-centered president of Kappa Kappa Tau sorority at Wallace University during the first season, where it was targeted by a serial killer in a red devil costume. In the second season, she is enlisted as a medical nurse by Dean Cathy Munsch in the C.U.R.E. Institute, where again, serial killings occur. Chanel was developed by Ryan Murphy and was created specifically for Roberts. The character, along with Roberts' portrayal has been acclaimed by critics and has become popular in the internet with quotations made by Roberts as Chanel.

== Storylines ==
=== Season one ===
Chanel is the incredibly egotistical, uncaring, self-centered, sociopathic president of Kappa Kappa Tau at Wallace University, and the leader of a popular clique she named after herself, The Chanels, which consists of Chanel #2 (Ariana Grande), Chanel #3 (Billie Lourd), and Chanel #5 (Abigail Breslin), the latter whom she harbors a huge hatred towards and often is the subject of her insults. She is also the on and off girlfriend of Chad Radwell (Glen Powell), the equally self-centered head of the Dickie Dollar Scholars. She is suspected to have viciously burned her predecessor, Melanie Dorkus (Brianne Howey), after filling her spray tan tank with hydrochloric acid in retribution for her abuse towards her. Her bullying activities in the sorority causes the university's dean, Dean Cathy Munsch (Jamie Lee Curtis), to revoke the sorority's charter. However, the Kappa Kappa Tau's national president, Gigi Caldwell (Nasim Pedrad) intercedes, but not before she and Dean Munsch make a deal. Chanel is horrified when it was revealed by Munsch that she has to accept anyone who wishes to join Kappa which allows outcast students to pledge. She and her minions try to scare the new pledges away with a prank gone wrong when she unintentionally burnt Ms. Bean (Jan Hoag), the housemaid's face. When Chanel #2 and Tiffany "Deaf Taylor Swift" was killed by the Red Devil, Gigi hired Denise Hemphill to protect Kappa's house. Later on, she decided to give Hester Ulrich (Lea Michele) a makeover, nicknaming her Chanel #6, but later she became suspicious of her because of her hypocrite and backstabbing personality. She has intense anger towards Grace and Zayday after the latter decides to run for the president of Kappa Kappa Tau. The two were forced to become co-presidents after the votes are tied; Chanel then reveals that she deliberately wanted Zayday to become president to save herself from becoming a target of the Red Devil. She forces The Chanels to try their best to expose Grace and Zayday as she believes that they are working with the Red Devil—all the while, the other Chanels plan to murder Chanel out of fear that she was the killer, which she reluctantly forgives them for. During her quest to prove that Grace is one of the killers, she unearths information about the true identity of Grace's mother and cruelly reveals it to her, but later apologizes and admits that she has an abusive mother herself. During Thanksgiving, she joined Chad's family's Thanksgiving in which she and Hester became the subject of the Radwells' insults. She and Hester make up and stand against the Radwells and leave, later joined by Chad himself. After previously suspecting Grace and Zayday, Chanel moves to suspect Dean Munsch and convince the Chanels and Zayday to kill Dean Munsch, which backfires. Near the finale, Chanel fakes an apology to Melanie Dorkus, only to reveal her intention to kill her because she thought Melanie is the killer. As the season come to an end, the Chanels are framed by Hester, revealed to be the Red Devil, and got disowned by their own families. They are sentenced to life in the asylum, where they unexpectedly find happiness. She became best friends with #5 after the latter received some medications and Chanel also got voted as the "house president". One night, before going to bed, she is visited by a knife-wielding Red Devil, leaving her screaming.

=== Season two ===
In season two, it is revealed that Chanel, #3, and #5 managed to leave the asylum after Hester confessed to her crimes and graduated from community college with a communications degree. She then became a phlebotomist and believed that it could rehabilitate her image as she and the Chanels were hated by the public even though they were acquitted of the accusations. Cathy Munsch offers Chanel a job as a medical student at the C.U.R.E Institute Hospital, which she accepts. Chanel becomes attracted to Dr. Brock Holt (John Stamos) and also assists him on cases. Chanel has reverted to hating Chanel #5 who had stopped taking her medication and also becomes the enemy of Nurse Ingrid Marie Hoffel (Kirstie Alley) who believes that she is not good enough to be a doctor. It is later revealed that the real reason Nurse Hoffel harbors intense hatred towards the Chanels so much is that Ms. Bean from season one is her sister, and Hoffel blames Chanel for her death. Chad Radwell goes to the C.U.R.E. institute to win Chanel back, revealing the first season's ending where a Red Devil popped up at the asylum was actually Chad trying to scare Chanel. Chad competes with Dr. Brock for Chanel's affection and wins when she accepts his proposal. However, before they can get married, Chad is murdered by the Green Meanie, leaving Chanel devastated. Not long after, Chanel moves on with Brock and strikes up a relationship with him. Chanel gets to meet her idol, Dr. Scarlett Lovin (Brooke Shields) whom she substitutes during her live show due to her untimely death. At the end of season 2, Chanel got enraged when Dr. Brock proposes to the dying Dean Munsch. Later, she, Dean Munsch (who is revealed not to be dying much to her relief), and the Chanels are taken hostage by Nurse Hoffel, who reveals all to Chanel. They are freed by Denise, and along with Zayday, they all chase Nurse Hoffel, who eventually slips into quicksand to her death. The aftermath shows Chanel taking over Dr. Scarlett's show "Lovin the D," and changing it to "Lovin the C" with Chanel #3 as her executive producer. In the finale scene, Chanel gets into her car and finds an old Kappa Kappa Tau ring and sees the Red Devil in the backseat of her car and screams. As of now with the series cancelled, her ultimate fate is unknown.

== Development ==
=== Casting and creation ===
Emma Roberts and Jamie Lee Curtis were the first actresses cast for the series as leads. Chanel was written specifically for Roberts. After she starred as Madison Montgomery in the third season of Ryan Murphy's American Horror Story, he was interested to cast her in another "bitchy" role. The inspiration behind Chanel's character was the 2013 infamous email rant written by a sorority sister at the University of Maryland about sorority sisters' interactions with a local fraternity.

=== Characterization ===
Chanel is vain, selfish, self-centered, and spoiled. She has blonde hair and hazel eyes. Her everyday clothes are very high fashion attires, and she follows a trendy and upscale fashion, being in cahoots with the likes of Karl Lagerfeld. She is always impeccably dressed, regardless of the places she may be in. She mostly dresses in (but not limited to) pink. While being violent and a bully, Chanel at least isn't fake, regularly displaying her nastiness to anyone, regardless of rank or position, and she torments everyone in the sorority, including (and especially) her own minions'. She usually says the first thing that pops up in her mind and has a knack for acrid and horrible zingers and one-liners. She likes to insult people and does whatever she wants. As a queen bee, she walks with a lot of confidence and is always the center of attention wherever she goes. Whenever anyone goes against her, she will go full length to crash their confidence. She is also very spoiled, as she regularly implies that everything should go her way and she is able to do so with her massive wealth. Every time her plans fail or do not go the way she planned, she panics and often finds it easier to blame it on anyone else, particularly one of her minions she hated the most, Chanel #5. At times, Chanel reluctantly shows a not-so-sincere caring side, mostly if she has a personal agenda to fulfill.

== Reception ==
Roberts's performance has been met with positive reviews from critics. IGN stated, "Two Murphy alums, Emma Roberts and Lea Michele, continued to prove that they're great at delivering his dialogue. Roberts in particular was a standout for me, and I relished every bitchy, whiny Chanel line she would give us." The Hollywood Reporter said, of Roberts' performance, "The Scream Queens creators revel in writing mean girls, and Roberts gives gung-ho commitment to spewing the worst of Chanel's eviscerating insults—Chanel's a solipsist, so we're not supposed to quibble at how floridly racist and misogynistic she sounds—while pausing to give just enough beats of underlying humanity." Her performance has also been praised by her fellow cast members, with Jamie Lee Curtis stating "with her delivery. It's a great kind of performance, to then breed the rest of all of us into sync."
