= Scream Queens season 2 =

Scream Queens
- Season 2
- Promotional poster
- Starring: Emma Roberts; Kirstie Alley; Taylor Lautner; Lea Michele; Abigail Breslin; Keke Palmer; Billie Lourd; James Earl; John Stamos; Jamie Lee Curtis
- No. of episodes: 10

Release
- Original network: Fox
- Original release: September 20 – December 20, 2016

Season chronology
- ← Previous; Season 1

The second season of the black comedy slasher television series Scream Queens aired on Fox. Fox renewed the series for a second season on January 15, 2016. It premiered on September 20, 2016, and concluded on December 20, 2016. The season consists of 10 episodes.

Emma Roberts, Abigail Breslin, Billie Lourd, Lea Michele, Keke Palmer, Niecy Nash, Glen Powell, Oliver Hudson and Jamie Lee Curtis reprise their roles from the previous season. John Stamos, Taylor Lautner, James Earl and Kirstie Alley were added to the main cast. Unlike the first season, which took place in a sorority house, the second season takes place in a hospital.

On May 15, 2017, Fox announced the cancellation of the series, making this the final season of the show.

== Plot ==
After the events at Wallace University, Dean Cathy Munsch becomes a global icon and purchases the C.U.R.E. Institute in order to reform America's health care system and to cure incurable diseases. Hester confesses her crimes, leading to the Chanels' release from prison. However, the Chanels remain hated in the nation. Cathy then casts two doctors — Dr. Cassidy Cascade and Dr. Brock Holt — to fulfill the mission of the hospital, and installs Zayday Williams and the Chanels as medical students. Meanwhile, flashbacks to 1985 show the hospital's dark past, as a new serial killer surfaces: the Green Meanie.

== Cast and characters ==
=== Main ===
- Emma Roberts as Chanel Oberlin
- Kirstie Alley as Nurse Ingrid M. Hoffel (née Bean) / The Green Meanie #4
- Taylor Lautner as Dr. Cassidy Cascade / The Green Meanie #2
- Lea Michele as Hester Ulrich / Chanel #6
- Abigail Breslin as Libby Putney / Chanel #5
- Keke Palmer as Zayday Williams
- Billie Lourd as Sadie Swenson / Chanel #3
- James Earl as Chamberlain Jackson
- John Stamos as Dr. Brock Holt
- Jamie Lee Curtis as Dr. Cathy Munsch

=== Special guest stars ===
- Niecy Nash as Denise Hemphill
- Colton Haynes as Tyler
- Brooke Shields as Dr. Scarlett Lovin

=== Recurring ===
- Glen Powell as Chad Radwell
- Oliver Hudson as Weston "Wes" Gardner / The Green Meanie #3
- Trilby Glover as Jane Hollis / The Green Meanie #1
- Jerry O'Connell as Dr. Mike
- Laura Bell Bundy as Nurse Thomas
- Andy Erikson as Marguerite Honeywell / Chanel #7
- Riley McKenna Weinstein as Daria Janssen / Chanel #8
- Dahlya Glick as Andrea / Chanel #10

=== Guest ===
- Jeremy Batiste as Bill Hollis
- Cecily Strong as Catherine Hobart
- Kevin Bigley as Randal
- Brian Baumgartner as Richard
- Cheri Oteri as Sheila Baumgartner
- Alec Mapa as Lynn Johnstone
- Ivar Brogger as Mitch Mitchum
- Mary Birdsong as Penelope Hotchkiss
- Pablo Castelblanco as Tristan St. Pierre / Chanel Pour Homme
- Moira O'Neill as Addison / Chanel #9
- Cathy Marks as Midge / Chanel #11
- Amy Okuda as Anna Plaisance
- Ray Fega as Slade Hornborn
- Bill Oberst Jr. as Clark

== Episodes ==
No. overall	No. in season	Title	Directed by	Written by	Original release date	Prod. code	US viewers (millions)
14	1	"Scream Again"	Brad Falchuk	Ryan Murphy & Brad Falchuk & Ian Brennan	September 20, 2016	2AYD01	2.17
In 1985, a pregnant woman interrupts a Halloween party in need of help for her husband and is directed to Dr. Mike, who tells her that he'll help her husband; then, Dr. Mike injects the woman's husband with an anesthetic and dumps the body in a swamp outside the hospital instead while she waits. In 2016, Cathy Munsch purchases a hospital and hires Dr. Brock Holt and Dr. Cassidy Cascade, as well as Zayday Williams, now a first year medical student. Cathy also hires the Chanels who had been released from the asylum and have spent nearly two years living poor and pathetic lives, after Hester confesses about the murders and are working in the medical industry. The hospital's first patient is Catherine Hobart who is diagnosed with werewolf syndrome. Zayday suggests a lobotomy, but Brock and Chanel suggest changing her diet, which causes her to completely lose her hair. Catherine and #5 each take a bath, but accidentally trap themselves in the tubs. A new serial killer, known as the "Green Meanie", appears and decapitates Catherine with a machete before turning toward #5.
15	2	"Warts and All"	Bradley Buecker	Brad Falchuk	September 27, 2016	2AYD02	1.70
After the local police dismiss Catherine's murder, Zayday and Chamberlain become convinced that Munsch is responsible and begin digging into the past of the hospital, discovering that on Halloween 1986, the Green Meanie slaughtered every single person inside. A man named Tyler, suffering from Neurofibromatosis (a collection of tumours all over his body), comes to the hospital for help. Munsch admits to Zayday and Chamberlain that she opened the hospital to find a cure for her own undiagnosable disease, and is later attacked by the Green Meanie, who escapes. Spooked, Munsch calls in Special Agent Denise Hemphill to solve the case. Denise takes Munsch and the Chanels to the maximum-security institution where Hester is incarcerated, where they learn that Hester knows the details of the Green Meanie and the hospital's past. Tyler prepares to undergo surgery on his tumors, but is intercepted by the Green Meanie, who kills him.
16	3	"Handidates"	Barbara Brown	Ian Brennan	October 11, 2016	2AYD03	1.59
Chad tells Dean Munsch about Brock's hand, who allows him to start searching for a replacement hand. Munsch, the Chanels, Zayday and Denise visit an old hospital employee and learn about the woman and baby. They realise that Brock can't be the killer, so they stop the surgery. Chad proposes to Chanel, as Denise and Zayday transfer Hester to the hospital to find out who the killer is. Cascade reveals to Chanel #3 that he "died" years ago and was somehow "brought back to life". The Green Meanie kills the two new patients and attacks Chamberlain, but leaves Zayday. At the altar, Chanel waits for Chad, who falls through the roof and is shown to be murdered.
17	4	"Halloween Blues"	Loni Peristere	Brad Falchuk	October 18, 2016	2AYD04	1.43
After the loss of Chad, Denise and Dean Munsch decide to seek the advice of Hester, who suggests that the C.U.R.E. Institute throw a Halloween party to lure the Green Meanie. Hester asks to attend the party but Munsch and Denise refuse. After Denise is attacked, she agrees to let Hester out for a 24 hour period in exchange for the identity of the Green Meanie. However, Hester disguises herself in an Ivanka Trump costume and escapes. As the faculty plans their trap on the Green Meanie, a dozen new patients arrive after being poisoned while bobbing for apples. Zayday realizes that the poisoning was a distraction while Denise discovers an injured #5, who was stabbed by the Green Meanie earlier, as Hester helped. Before she can help her, the Green Meanie returns and seemingly electrocutes Denise to death before leaving #5 to die.
18	5	"Chanel Pour Homme-icide"	Barbara Brown	Ian Brennan	November 15, 2016	2AYD05	1.42
Discovering Denise out cold and #5 injured, Dean Munsch and Zayday dispose of Denise's body in the freezer before finding the patients and some staff murdered. Chanel and #3 recruit five new Chanels, including a gay male named Tristan to use as bait for the Green Meanie, as well as Hester who returns to her previous role as #6 by giving them information about the killer. Cathy fires Nurse Hoffel, who blackmails her into getting her job back. Cassidy, Brock and #3 help a patient whose accents change however they are diagnosed with her syndrome but manage to help her. Zayday and #5 meet Jane, the pregnant woman in 1985, but are unsuccessful and unable to find information. Using Hester's idea, the Chanels send out #8 as bait however Tristan is consequently murdered whilst searching for a necklace. However, the new recruits encounter the Green Meanie who stabs and kills #11. It is revealed that Jane's son is actually Cassidy.
19	6	"Blood Drive"	Mary Wigmore	Brad Falchuk	November 22, 2016	2AYD06	1.15
The hospital run a blood drive competition, which Chanel is determined to win by collecting samples from the other Chanels. Munsch starts a false rumor that Chanel has been diagnosed with sexually-transmitted diseases, which causes Holt to reconsider his relationship with her. While giving blood, Chanel #9 is killed by the Green Meanie by having all her blood drained. The Green Meanie is confronted by Hoffel and reveals himself as Cassidy Cascade. Hoffel joins forces with Cassidy, becoming the third Green Meanie and the brains of the operation. Chanel wins the competition with all the blood from #9.
20	7	"The Hand"	Barbara Brown	Ian Brennan	November 29, 2016	2AYD07	1.33
In an effort to secure positive press for the hospital, Dean Munsch pitches a risky surgery to Dr. Holt, whose hand begins expressing more of a wild and dangerous personality than ever before. Chanel #3 forces Cassidy to undergo a psych test to find the root of his condition with surprising results, and Nurse Hoffel sets a devious plan in motion. Meanwhile, Chanel #10 and Slade Hornborn, a reporter covering Dr. Holt's surgery, are murdered by the Green Meanie.
21	8	"Rapunzel, Rapunzel"	Jamie Lee Curtis	Brad Falchuk	December 6, 2016	2AYD08	1.18
Wes Gardner shows up at the hospital, hoping to win back Cathy. Zayday and Chamberlain try to trap the Green Meanie, but Zayday is drugged and captured. Chanel and Brock have sex; however, Brock says 'Cathy' during intercourse, angering Chanel. Chamberlain discovers that Wes is the third and final Green Meanie. Wes reveals that Grace blames the Chanels for his daughter's mental incarceration. Wes then stabs and kills Chamberlain.
22	9	"Lovin the D"	Maggie Kiley	Ian Brennan	December 13, 2016	2AYD09	1.13
While working the graveyard shift at the hospital, the Chanels are attacked by a trio of Green Meanies. The killers hold a summit, where they all confess to their murders and debate who gets to kill the remaining Chanels. Hoffel is selected. Meanwhile, Scarlet Lovin, a famous television personality, orders a live surgery featuring Brock and the Chanels. Scarlet dies after drinking poisoned coffee meant for Chanel. Chanel #7 is strangled by the Green Meanie. Wes is confronted by Cassidy and Hoffel for trying to kill Chanel by himself. Wes kills himself by falling into hot oil.
23	10	"Drain the Swamp"	Ian Brennan	Brad Falchuk & Ian Brennan	December 20, 2016	2AYD10	1.37
Cassidy tries to kill Chanel #3, but cannot bring himself to do so. Cassidy then tells Hoffel that he's out. Hoffel finds Chanel #8, who tells her the swamp water is highly flammable, which gives Hoffel the idea to make a fertilizer bomb. Zayday convinces Jane that she is not a bad mother and killing people is not the answer. Hoffel traps everyone in the basement and reveals that Chanel killed her sister: Ms. Bean. Jane and Zayday come to reason with Hoffel, who fatally shoots Jane. Denise defuses the bomb. Everyone chases Hoffel, who kills Cassidy in the process. Hoffel falls into some quicksand and begins sinking to her death. In the epilogue, Chanel narrates and reveals what happened to everybody after the murders.

== Casting ==
In June 2016, John Stamos, Taylor Lautner and James Earl joined the cast of the series, portraying doctors and an employee at the hospital, respectively.

In July 2016, Colton Haynes and Cecily Strong were announced to guest star in the season. That same month, Jerry O'Connell and Laura Bell Bundy were announced to have recurring roles. In August 2016, it was announced Cheri Oteri would also guest star. In September 2016, Kirstie Alley was cast in the series. In November 2016, Brooke Shields was announced to guest star in the series.

== Reception ==
=== Critical response ===
The second season of Scream Queens has received positive reviews, with critics labelling it a big improvement over the previous season. The review aggregator website Rotten Tomatoes reported an 86% approval rating with an average rating of 7.10/10 based on 7 reviews.

=== Ratings ===
Viewership and ratings per episode of Scream Queens season 2
No.	Title	Air date	Rating/share (18–49)	Viewers (millions)	DVR (18–49)	DVR viewers (millions)	Total (18–49)	Total viewers (millions)
1	"Scream Again"	September 20, 2016	1.0/3	2.17	0.7	1.47	1.7	3.64
2	"Warts and All"	September 27, 2016	0.7/3	1.70	0.7	1.20	1.4	2.90
3	"Handidates"	October 11, 2016	0.7/2	1.59	—N/a	0.99	—N/a	2.58
4	"Halloween Blues"	October 18, 2016	0.6/2	1.43	0.5	0.96	1.1	2.39
5	"Chanel Pour Homme-icide"	November 15, 2016	0.6/2	1.42	0.4	—N/a	1.0	—N/a
6	"Blood Drive"	November 22, 2016	0.5/2	1.15	0.3	0.57	0.8	1.72
7	"The Hand"	November 29, 2016	0.5/2	1.33	0.3	0.66	0.8	1.93
8	"Rapunzel, Rapunzel"	December 6, 2016	0.5/2	1.18	0.3	—N/a	0.8	—N/a
9	"Lovin the D"	December 13, 2016	0.5/2	1.13	0.3	0.61	0.8	1.74
10	"Drain the Swamp"	December 20, 2016	0.5/2	1.37	0.4	0.75	0.9	2.12

== Home media ==
Scream Queens – The Complete Second Season
Set Details		Special Features
10 Episodes; 5 Disc Set; English 5.1 Dolby Digital; Japanese 5.1 Dolby Digital; Subtitles: English, Japanese; Runtime: 444 Minutes		Pitch Episode 1; This Is Us Episode 1; Empire Episode 1; Minority Report Episode 1; Damien Episode 1
Release Dates
Region 1	Region 2	Region 4
—N/a	February 28, 2018	—N/a
