= Hester Ulrich =

Fictional character from the Fox series Scream Queens

- Scream Queens character
- Lea Michele as Hester Ulrich
- First appearance: "Pilot" (2015)
- Last appearance: "Drain the Swamp" (2016)
- Created by: Ryan Murphy; Brad Falchuk; Ian Brennan
- Portrayed by: Lea Michele
- Birth name: Hester Doyle
- Born: October 1995 (age 30)

In-universe information
- Alias: Red Devil; Chanel #6
- Nickname: Neckbrace
- Gender: Female
- Occupation: Red Devil; KKT Treasurer (formerly); Medical student Green Meanie accomplice
- Family: Wes Gardner (father); Sophia Doyle (mother); Boone Clemens (twin brother); Grace Gardner (half-sister); Gigi Caldwell (foster mother)
- Nationality: American

Hester Ulrich (née Doyle) is a fictional character in the horror-comedy television series Scream Queens, portrayed by Lea Michele. Hester is introduced as a pledge of the popular Kappa Kappa Tau sorority at Wallace University. She faked suffering from scoliosis and is accepted as a pledge due to Dean Cathy Munch's new rule that everyone who would like to join the university's fraternities and sororities is welcome to. She was the main antagonist of season one.

== Casting ==
It was announced on January 17, 2015, that Lea Michele had been cast as a series regular for an unspecified role, later revealed to be Hester. Ryan Murphy revealed that he cast Michele specifically for the role of Hester, so that she could play the murderer, a drastic change from her character in Glee. During her scenes as the Red Devil, Hester was portrayed by stuntman Riley Schmidt. A female actress, Olga Wilhelmine Munding, was hired for later episodes, specifically for Hester's scenes in the costume.

== Characterization ==
Hester has olive-colored skin, messy, dirty brown hair and brown eyes. Hester's style is described as pretty nerdy. She wears cat t-shirts, floral skirts and a bad nylon tracksuit jacket from the '80s. Hester also wears a neck brace because of her scoliosis. Chanel calls her "Neckbrace" because of this. As Chanel #6, Hester wears Chanel's white and pastel glamour dresses, fur coats and sparkly high platforms.

Hester is crazy, two-faced, and is incredibly different from the other girls in Kappa Kappa Tau. She has a serious obsession with death, dead bodies and, strangely, gets sexually attracted to them. She always has the idea of death flowing into her mind. Hester is a massive Chanel wannabe, and will do anything to please and protect Chanel, and is loyal towards her. At the same time, she wants to take everything from Chanel, and become the true leader of Kappa house. She wants to actually become Chanel #1 and will do anything to steal Chanel's boyfriend, Chad Radwell, so much so that she lies about being pregnant with his baby. Hester likes to take her life to the extreme and experiment, but deep down she is actually pretty afraid and human, like when she and Chad find Ms. Bean's body in the Haunted House, thinking it was a wax figure. Unlike her twin brother, Boone, Hester is very open about her psychotic, death-obsessed personality, and is calm and comfortable when someone points it out. This allows Hester to slip past and fool everyone into thinking she is not the Red Devil.

== Storylines ==
=== Background ===
Hester Ulrich was born in October 1995 as Hester Doyle, the daughter of Kappa pledge Sophia Doyle, who died from blood loss after giving birth in the bathtub due to the neglect of the sorority president and her minions. She and her twin, Boone, were raised in a mental asylum by a depressed Gigi Caldwell, who grieved for 3 years over her sister Amy's suicide. Gigi managed to improve enough to teach the children how to be serial killers, so that they can conduct their 20-year-long plan for revenge against Kappa Kappa Tau. Hester stole an asylum patient's neck brace (and presumably killed them) for her disguise, and her brother pretended to be gay. After being released, she managed to get into Wallace University; Dean Cathy Munsch accepted her fake high school information and gave her a disability permit for her severe scoliosis, which she pretended to have. Hester refers to herself as the brains of the operation and Boone as the muscle. It is later revealed that their biological father is Wes Gardner, the father of Hester's KKT sister Grace Gardner.

=== Season 1 ===
In the pilot episode, she is nicknamed "Neckbrace" by Chanel Oberlin, and witnesses the death of Ms. Bean and fellow Kappa pledge Tiffany DeSalle. She has an obsession with death which is shown when she gives several ways to dispose of Chanel #2's body, all which are disgusting and insane. In "Chainsaw", she snoops around Chanel's closet before being caught. Chanel then completely transforms her into Chanel #6 and removes the neck brace, horrifying #5. Hester's evil plan comes to light when she announces her pregnancy to Chanel, who is furious once she learns that it was fake and that Chad will still get her pregnant anyway. She stops it by pushing Hester down the Kappa staircase, breaking her neck and supposedly killing her. Hester returns alive, however, at the Radwell's Thanksgiving dinner, where she is insulted by his family. This causes Hester and Chanel to make amends with one another after Chanel stands up to Chad and his family. She also witnesses Gigi's severed head on a platter. She participates in the Black Friday doorbuster but is trapped alongside the other Chanels. She, #3 and #5 escape, while Chanel is shot in the chest by the Red Devil's crossbow. Hester later joins the plan to kill Dean Munsch but the group fails to do so.

In "Dorkus", Pete decides to tell Grace everything and reveals that he discovered the identity of the female bathtub baby. He reveals that it is one of her sisters and is about to tell her, before Hester as the Red Devil breaks out of the closet and kills him. Grace and Zayday later go through all of their sisters' profiles and discover that Hester's is faked and she took classes that could help her become the Red Devil. They return home to confront her but she has stabbed herself in the eye and puts the blame on Chanel #5. Earlier that day, Hester killed a pizza delivery guy to point the finger towards Melanie Dorkus.

In "The Final Girl(s)", Hester confesses her crimes in a narration and then proceeds to frame the Chanels for the murder. In 2016, she is the treasurer of Kappa Kappa Tau and while polishing a memorial for the kids who were killed, Cathy confronts Hester about her being the killer and threatens to turn her into the police. Hester retaliates by threatening to turn Cathy to the police for the cover up of Sophia Doyle's death back in 1995, and the murder of her ex-husband. The two agree to keep the other's secret and part ways.

=== Season 2 ===
Hester later confessed to her crimes to Special Agent Denise Hemphill, believing that she couldn't be touched because of double jeopardy, and is incarcerated while the Chanels are acquitted at their retrial. It is unknown why the police or Hemphill began to suspect Hester for the crimes.

The Chanels, Munsch, and Hemphill later visit Hester at the federal asylum to get clues about the murders at the hospital. Hester brags about knowing who the killer is. However, she wants to transfer to the hospital and get discontinued beauty products in exchange for being let out of her cage. At the hospital's Halloween party, she disguises herself as Ivanka Trump and attempts to murder Chanel. She then works with the Green Meanie. She goes up to stab Chanel #5, before the Green Meanie comes up and does it himself, as Hester watches and he proceeds to let her leave untouched. Afterwards, she once again offers her services to Chanel; she eventually disappears after the murder of one of the Chanels, which she seems to have previously known about or anticipated. After the three Green Meanies reveal themselves as Dr. Cascade, Nurse Hoffel, and her father Wes Gardner, Hester calls a Green Meanie summit to determine who killed who and who will kill who next. Meanwhile, Dr. Brock Holt confides in her over his urges to kill, as she was a Red Devil. She convinces him to become a killer, and after the Green Meanies are all defeated, the two of them take Dean Munsch's money and flee to Blood Island to kill tourists in the style of a hunting game.

== Reception ==
=== Critical response ===
Michele's performance has been met with positive reviews. Entertainment Tonight critic Leanne Aguilera wrote, "Michele – who barely says more than six words in the entire first hour! – is an undeniable scene stealer as the overly-knowledgeable Kappa pledge who doesn't let Chanel's intensity stifle her enthusiasm to support her sisters." Terri Schwartz of IGN identified Michele as a standout performer from the first two episodes of the series. The New York Times critic Mike Hale stated, "Best of all is Lea Michele of Glee, who plays an affirmative-action pledge who's locked into a neck brace and can make you laugh simply by darting her eyes helplessly around her limited field of vision." Kristin Dos Santos of E! wrote, "As Hester, the neck-braced KKT pledge who doesn't utter a single line really in the pilot, Lea kills it, doing more with a few facial expressions that many actresses do in a few seasons."

=== Accolades ===
Ceremony	Year	Category	Outcome	Ref
People's Choice Awards	2016	Favorite Actress In A New TV Series	Nominated	
Teen Choice Awards	2016	Choice TV Actress: Comedy	Nominated	
Teen Choice Awards	2016	Choice TV: Villain	Nominated	
