= Scream Again (Scream Queens) =

- Scream Queens episode
- Episode no.: Season 2 Episode 1
- Directed by: Brad Falchuk
- Written by: Ryan Murphy & Brad Falchuk & Ian Brennan
- Production code: 2AYD01
- Original air date: September 20, 2016
- Running time: 42 minutes

Guest appearances
- Niecy Nash as Special Agent Denise Hemphill; Jerry O'Connell as Dr. Mike; Cecily Strong as Catherine Hobart; Laura Bell Bundy as Nurse Thomas; Jeremy Batiste as Bill Hollis; Trilby Glover as Jane

Episode chronology
← Previous "The Final Girl(s)"	Next → "Warts and All"
- Scream Queens (season 2)

"Scream Again" is the season premiere and the fourteenth episode of the horror black comedy series Scream Queens, which premiered on Fox on September 20, 2016. It was directed by Brad Falchuk and written by Falchuk and his co-creators, Ryan Murphy and Ian Brennan. The episode was watched by 2.17 million viewers and received mixed to positive reviews from critics.

The episode revolves around Cathy Munsch's recent acquisition, the C.U.R.E. Hospital, which she bought in order to cure the incurable and to reorganize the U.S. health system, while flashbacks shows a connection with the hospital from 1985. Zayday Williams and the Chanels are cast as medical students by Cathy, while a new serial killer surfaces.

== Plot ==
In 1985, a pregnant woman interrupts a Halloween party in need of help for her husband and is directed to Dr. Mike, who tells her that he'll help her husband; then, Dr. Mike injects the woman's husband with an anesthetic and dumps the body in a swamp outside the hospital instead while she waits.

In 2016, Cathy Munsch purchases a hospital and hires Dr. Brock Holt and Dr. Cassidy Cascade, as well as Zayday Williams, now a first year medical student. Cathy also hires the Chanels who had been released from the asylum and have spent nearly two years living poor and pathetic lives, after Hester confesses about the murders and are working in the medical industry. The hospital's first patient is Catherine Hobart who is diagnosed with werewolf syndrome. Zayday suggests a lobotomy, but Brock and Chanel suggest changing her diet, which causes her to completely lose her hair. Catherine and #5 each take a bath, but accidentally trap themselves in the tubs. A new serial killer, known as the "Green Meanie", appears and decapitates Catherine with a machete before turning toward #5.

== Production ==
"Scream Again" was directed by series' co-creator Brad Falchuk and written by Falchuk alongside also co-creators Ryan Murphy and Ian Brennan. On January 15, 2016, Fox renewed the series for a second season, to be set in a hospital. In June 2016, John Stamos, Taylor Lautner and James Earl joined the cast of the series, portraying doctors and an employee at the hospital, respectively. In July, Jerry O'Connell and Laura Bell Bundy were announced to have recurring roles as Dr. Mike and Nurse Thomas, respectively. In September 2016, Kirstie Alley was cast in the series, playing Ingrid Hoffel.

== Reception ==
=== Ratings ===
"Scream Again" premiered in the U.S. on September 20, 2016, on Fox, to a viewership of 2.17 million viewers, and received a 1.0 rating in the 18–49 demographic, according to Nielsen Media Research.

=== Critical response ===
Terri Schwartz of IGN wrote a mixed review for the episode, stating: "Scream Queens goes off the deep end with no life preserver in sight for Season 2, losing any tenuous grips on reality for the sake of turning its central characters into even bigger caricatures than they were in Season 1. While some of the stalwarts work -- particularly Curtis' Munsch and Roberts' Chanel #1 -- the show still has a way to go before it fully finds its voice." TVFanatic writer Caralynn Lippo affirmed "[the episode] was a fun start to the new season. It managed to successfully reintroduce all of our favorite characters after a two year time jump, while still laying the groundwork for what seems like a fun new setting and killer mystery."
