= Dorkus =

- Scream Queens episode
- Episode no.: Season 1 Episode 12
- Directed by: Bradley Buecker
- Written by: Ryan Murphy; Brad Falchuk; Ian Brennan
- Production code: 1AYD12
- Original air date: December 8, 2015
- Running time: 43 minutes

Guest appearances
- Brianne Howey as Melanie Dorkus; Michael Siberry as Melanie Dorkus' butler; Deneen Tyler as Shondell Washington; Aaron Rhodes as Roger (archive footage); Nick Jonas as Boone Clemens (archive footage, uncredited)

Episode chronology
← Previous "Black Friday"	Next → "The Final Girl(s)"

"Dorkus" is the twelfth and penultimate episode of the first season of the black comedy slasher television series Scream Queens. It premiered on December 8, 2015 on Fox and was shown back-to-back with the season's final episode, "The Final Girl(s)". The episode was directed by Bradley Buecker and written by Ryan Murphy, Brad Falchuk, and Ian Brennan. The episode follows Chanel's life spiraling downhill, as well as Grace getting information about the identity of the last "Red Devil" killer.

The episode was watched by 2.53 million viewers and received mixed to positive reviews from critics.

== Plot ==
The episode opens with Pete (Diego Boneta) confessing to Grace (Skyler Samuels) that he has been helping the Red Devils commit murder. He'd crossed paths with them during the events of Hell Week, as he had been outside of the sorority house the night that Denise's (Niecy Nash) friend Shondell (Deneen Tyler) was murdered, and had agreed to help them in exchange for his own life. Pete tries to justify himself by claiming that this helped him accomplish his task of bringing down the Greek system at the college and that Grace herself had even expressed some thoughts to this extent. This horrifies Grace and just as she's about to leave Pete tells her that he's discovered the identity of the remaining Red Devil, who is one of the Chanels. However, before he can tell her the specific person he is murdered by the remaining, unknown Red Devil, leaving Grace to fight the final devil and trying to unmask them. However, she fails and is knocked out by the remaining Red Devil.

Meanwhile, many students have returned to campus to jeer Chanel (Emma Roberts), after she sent out a scathing e-mail rant to the other sorority members, calling them multiple expletives and insulting them for not showing up to help murder Dean Cathy Munsch (Jamie Lee Curtis). As the remaining murderer is one of the Chanels, she forwards the e-mail to the entire campus, causing it to go viral across the country. As she feels her reputation is ruined, in a fit of despair, she tries to kill herself using a mail ordered snake, only for it to end up being a harmless garter snake. Zayday discovers Chanel and tries to convince her that this isn't the end and that she can still change. As Chanel begins to thank Zayday for her advice, the two are attacked by a pizza delivery guy in a Red Devil costume. They manage to fight him off. They take him downstairs, where the rest of the Chanels arrive. Hester (Lea Michele) claims that she saw a girl with burned skin carrying a shovel, but this was dismissed immediately by Chanel to focus on the pizza delivery man. The man claims that he was forced to attack them by an unknown woman and that he has dynamite strapped to his body. Upon realizing the bomb, the girls run away and hide from the man as it goes off, killing him.

The death briefly traumatized Chanel #5/Libby Putney (Abigail Breslin). Choosing not to dwell on the man's murder, Chanel decides to apologize to as many people as possible, the first of whom will be Melanie Dorkus (Brianne Howey), the former KKT president that got her skin burned by the tan spray in Pilot. While at her house, Chanel #5 part ways to go on a date. However, rather than going there to apologize, Chanel is actually there to murder Melanie, as she suspects her of being the remaining killer, due to Hester's previous report. During this time, Hester starts to rob Chanel's closet. On the other hand, to know who the killer is, Grace and Zayday decide to break into Munsch's house so they can use her computer to access the personal files of the Chanels, using Grace's father, Wes (Oliver Hudson), to distract Munsch, by having sex with her. Unexpectedly, Wes falls for Cathy. Grace and Zayday find out that one of the Chanels' files has obviously false information such as listing "Sweet Valley High" as her former high school. With this knowledge in mind they rush to Melanie's house and narrowly prevent Chanel from killing her when Grace reveals Hester is the killer. Grace, Zayday, Chanel and Chanel #3 return to the sorority house, where they find Chanel #5 who claims that she has been stood up on a date. They discover a conscious Hester lying on the ground with a red stiletto in her eye, pointing towards Chanel #5 and accusing her of being the Red Devil.

== Reception ==
=== Ratings ===
Dorkus, along with the next episode The Final Girl(s) as the special two-hour season finale, was watched by live by 2.53 million U.S. viewers and got a 0.9/3 rating/share in the 18-49 adult demographic.

=== Critical reception ===
The two-hour finale episode received generally mixed to positive reviews from critics and audiences. Terri Schwartz from IGN gave the episode a rating of 8.5, with the consensus "Scream Queens went heavy on plot in 'Dorkus,' but that didn't stop it from delivering some hilarious sequences." The A.V. Club's LaToya Ferguson rated the episode along with "The Final Girl(s)" and gave it a C rating, criticizing it for drawing out the reveal and for putting too much focus on the least interesting characters.
