= Billie Lourd =

American actress (born 1992)

- Lourd at the 2026 New York Film Festival
- Born: Billie Catherine Lourd; July 17, 1992 (age 34); Los Angeles, California, U.S.
- Education: New York University (B.A.)
- Occupation: Actress
- Years active: 2015–present
- Spouse: Austen Rydell (m. 2022)
- Children: 2
- Parents: Bryan Lourd (father); Carrie Fisher (mother)
- Relatives: Eddie Fisher (grandfather); Debbie Reynolds (grandmother); Todd Fisher (uncle); Joely Fisher (half-aunt); Tricia Leigh Fisher (half-aunt); Mark Rydell (grandfather-in-law); Joanne Linville (grandmother-in-law)

Billie Catherine Lourd (born July 17, 1992) is an American actress, best known for starring as Chanel #3 in the Fox horror comedy series Scream Queens (2015–2016) and for her roles in the FX horror anthology series American Horror Story (2017–present). She also appears as Lieutenant Connix in the Star Wars sequel trilogy (2015–2019). Lourd is the only child of actress Carrie Fisher.

== Early life ==
Billie Catherine Lourd was born July 17, 1992, in Los Angeles, California, the only child of actress Carrie Fisher and talent agent Bryan Lourd. Lourd is also the only grandchild of actress Debbie Reynolds and singer Eddie Fisher, and the niece of Todd Fisher, Joely Fisher, and Tricia Leigh Fisher, all of whom have worked in show business. She has a sister, Ava, from her father's marriage to Bruce Bozzi, whom her father legally adopted. From her mother's side, she is of Russian-Jewish and Scots-Irish/English descent. Her godmother is actress Meryl Streep. Writer Bruce Wagner is Lourd's godfather.

Lourd was raised in Los Angeles, and was a childhood neighbor and close friend of Frances Bean Cobain, daughter of Kurt Cobain and Courtney Love. Lourd attended high school at Harvard-Westlake School in Los Angeles. In 2008, she was a debutante at Le Bal des débutantes at the Hôtel de Crillon in Paris. She was dressed by Chanel for the occasion.

She graduated with a self-designed degree in "Art and Business as Religion" from New York University Gallatin School of Individualized Study, in 2014.

== Career ==
=== 2015–2019: Early roles ===
Lourd played the role of Lieutenant Connix in the 2015 Star Wars sequel film The Force Awakens. On The Ellen DeGeneres Show in 2017, she said that she auditioned for the lead role of Rey, which ultimately went to Daisy Ridley. Lourd also appeared in the second installment, Star Wars: The Last Jedi (2017), and the third, Star Wars: The Rise of Skywalker (2019). Lourd also played her mother's character for a brief flashback in the film in which her face was digitally replaced by Fisher's likeness, using imagery from Return of the Jedi.

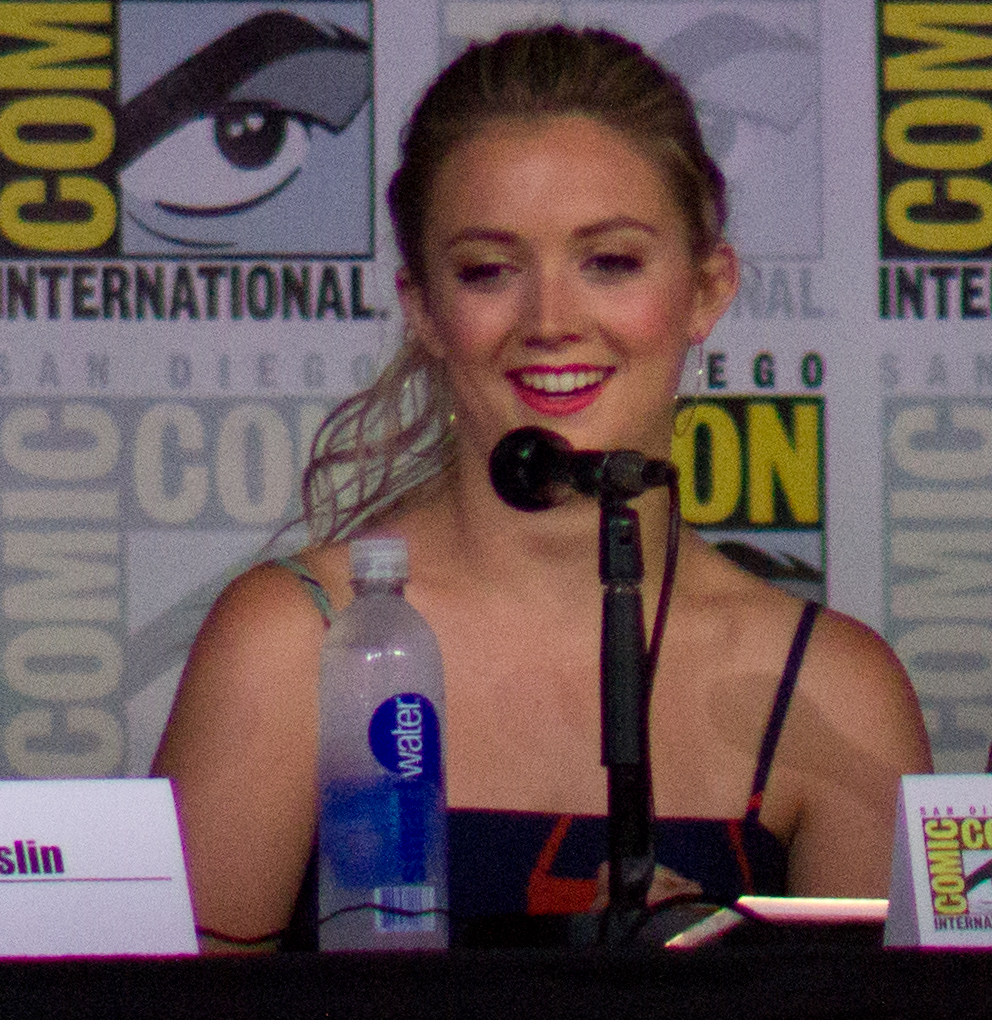
Lourd at the 2016 San Diego Comic-Con

In February 2015, Lourd was cast in the Fox horror-comedy series Scream Queens. Lourd's character, a rich and disaffected sorority girl known as Chanel #3, wears earmuffs as an homage to Fisher's iconic "cinnamon buns" hairstyle from the original Star Wars film. In December 2015, Lourd spoke about her initial meeting with Scream Queens creator Ryan Murphy:

I thought he wanted me to audition, and so I was just very relaxed and casual about the news. I didn't think he wanted to hire me, I knew that's not how things worked. The next day, they told me, you know that offer you didn't sound too excited about? It's an offer, not an audition. I flipped out. I didn't know how he was doing this! The next week I was in New Orleans.

In December 2015, Lourd had joined the cast of the American biographical crime-drama film Billionaire Boys Club, in the role of Rosanna, love interest of Kyle Biltmore. The film was released on July 17, 2018. Its release was put off due to claims of sexual harassment committed by actor Kevin Spacey, who stars in the film. In 2016, Lourd returned to Scream Queens for its second season. She joined the cast of American Horror Story in the role of Winter Anderson for the series' seventh season. She also portrayed Linda Kasabian, a former member of the Manson Family cult. She returned to American Horror Story for its eighth season, Apocalypse, playing Mallory, a powerful witch.

=== 2019–present: Continued success ===
In 2019, Lourd played Gigi in Booksmart, a high school comedy film directed by Olivia Wilde. Lourd also returned to American Horror Story for its ninth season, 1984, portraying an aerobics enthusiast punk rocker Montana Duke. Murphy stated that her work in 1984 impressed him so much that he decided to write Lourd her own miniseries. She appeared in the ninth episode of the eleventh and final season of the NBC sitcom Will & Grace as Fiona, the granddaughter of the character that her real-life grandmother, Debbie Reynolds, portrayed during the show's original run. In December 2019, Lourd appeared in a holiday-themed television commercial for Old Navy.

In 2021, Lourd returned to American Horror Story for the tenth season of the series as Lark Feldman, a mysterious tattoo artist and dentist. The following year, she starred in the romantic comedy Ticket to Paradise alongside Julia Roberts and George Clooney. She also returned to American Horror Story for its eleventh season as Hannah Wells, a biologist studying a viral strain in New York City. She later starred as Audrey in the transatlantic comedy And Mrs directed by Daniel Reisinger. Lourd also had a recurring role in the twelfth season of American Horror Story and reprised the roles of Winter Anderson and Mallory in the thirteenth season of the series. In September 2026, Lourd starred as Emma Borden in Monster: The Lizzie Borden Story.

== Personal life ==
Lourd began dating actor Austen Rydell in early 2016. During a brief split from Rydell, she dated actor and Scream Queens co-star Taylor Lautner from December 2016 to July 2017. Later in 2017, Lourd and Rydell reconciled. They became engaged in June 2020 and were married in March 2022. They have two children: a son, born in September 2020, and a daughter, born in December 2022.

Through her marriage to Rydell, Lourd is the daughter-in-law of actor Christopher Rydell, and the granddaughter-in-law of director Mark Rydell and actress Joanne Linville.

== Filmography ==
Key
†	Denotes films that have not yet been released

=== Film ===
Year	Title	Role	Notes
2015	Star Wars: The Force Awakens	Lieutenant Kaydel Ko Connix	
2017	Star Wars: The Last Jedi	Lieutenant Kaydel Ko Connix	
2018	Billionaire Boys Club	Rosanna Ricci	
2019	Booksmart	Gigi	
2019	Star Wars: The Rise of Skywalker	Lieutenant Kaydel Ko Connix	
2019	Star Wars: The Rise of Skywalker	Young Princess Leia Organa	CGI of Carrie Fisher
2022	Ticket to Paradise	Wren Butler	
2024	And Mrs	Audrey	
2024	The Last Showgirl	Hannah Gardner	
2025	Smurfs	Worry Smurf	Voice
2025	Adulthood	Grace Briscoe	
2025	A Very Jonas Christmas Movie	Cassidy	
2026	Love Language	Tilda	
2026	That Friend	Penny	
2026	Artificial †	Helen Toner	Post–production

=== Television ===
Year	Title	Role	Notes
2015–2016	Scream Queens	Sadie Swenson / Chanel #3	Main role, 23 episodes
2017	American Horror Story: Cult	Winter Anderson	Main role, 10 episodes
2017	American Horror Story: Cult	Linda Kasabian	Episode: "Charles (Manson) in Charge"
2018	American Horror Story: Apocalypse	Mallory	Main role, 8 episodes
2019	American Horror Story: 1984	Montana Duke	Main role, 9 episodes
2020	Will & Grace	Fiona Adler	Episode: "Bi-plane"
2021	American Horror Stories	Liv Whitley	Episode: "BA'AL"
2021	American Horror Story: Double Feature	Leslie "Lark" Feldman	Main role, 2 episodes
2022	American Horror Story: NYC	Dr. Hannah Wells	Main role, 7 episodes
2023	Strange Planet	Loud Teen (voice)	Guest role, 2 episodes
2023–2024	American Horror Story: Delicate	Ashley	Recurring role, 3 episodes
2025	Mid-Century Modern	Becca Frank	Episode: "Turbulence"
2026	Monster: The Lizzie Borden Story	Emma Borden	Recurring role, 3 episodes
2026	American Horror Story: 13	Winter Anderson	Main role, 8 episodes
2026	American Horror Story: 13	Mallory	Main role, 8 episodes

=== Producer ===
Year	Title	Notes
2022	Wildflower	
2025	Late Fame	Executive producer

== Awards and nominations ==
Award	Year	Category	Work	Result	Ref.
Los Angeles Online Film Critics Society	2019	Best Supporting Actress	Booksmart	Won	
San Sebastián International Film Festival	2024	Special Jury Prize	The Last Showgirl	Won	(Note: Shared with Kiernan Shipka, Pamela Anderson, Brenda Song, Dave Bautista and Jamie Lee Curtis)

== See also ==
Notes
