= The Final Girl(s) =

- Scream Queens episode
- Episode no.: Season 1 Episode 13
- Directed by: Brad Falchuk
- Written by: Ryan Murphy; Brad Falchuk; Ian Brennan
- Production code: 1AYD13
- Original air date: December 8, 2015
- Running time: 42 minutes

Guest appearances
- Nick Jonas as Boone Clemens (voice only); Niecy Nash as Denise Hemphill; Whitney Meyer as Tiffany DeSalle / "Deaf Taylor Swift"; Wallace Langham as Mr. Putney; Jean Louisa Kelly as Delight Ulrich; Steven Culp as Clark Ulrich; Skylar Gasper as 5-year-old Hester; Beau Hart as 5-year-old Boone; Lara Grice as Mrs. Putney; Jeanna Han as Sam / "Predatory Lez"

Episode chronology
← Previous "Dorkus"	Next → "Scream Again"

"The Final Girl(s)" is the thirteenth and final episode of the first season of the black comedy slasher television series Scream Queens. It premiered on December 8, 2015 on Fox along with the previous episode, "Dorkus", as the two-hour season finale. It was directed by Brad Falchuk, and written by Falchuk, Ryan Murphy and Ian Brennan. The episode focuses on the last remaining "Red Devil" killer, and how the revelation impacts the characters' fates.

The episode was watched by 2.53 million viewers and received mixed to positive reviews from critics, although the killer's identity was heavily criticized.

== Plot ==
=== January 2016 ===
One month after the Red Devil murders, Kappa Kappa Tau has been rebuilt to focus on feminism and acceptance of different women. The house is now run by Zayday, Grace, and Hester. Hester narrates recent events. She was the second Red Devil and the other bathtub baby. After Amy's suicide by drug overdose, Amy's inconsolable sister Gigi was committed and raised Hester and Boone at Palmer Asylum. Planning revenge against Kappa, Gigi taught them to be serial killers. Hester stole an asylum patient's neck brace and falsified her high school records to attend Wallace inconspicuously. She, Gigi, and Boone murdered the Red Devil mascot for his costume. Hester and Boone put hydrochloric acid in Melanie Dorkus's tank, and Hester activated the fryer to kill Ms. Bean. Hester is happy to have her biological father Wes and half-sister Grace in her life, even though only Hester knows of their connection. She framed the Chanels for the murders.

=== December 2015 ===
The month before, doctors easily remove the shoe from Hester's eye, as she inserted it herself to minimize injury. Grace and Zayday suspect her, but she claims to have falsified her records due to embarrassment at having been homeschooled. She presents actors who claim to be the biological parents who raised her, making it impossible for her to be the bathtub baby. She accuses all three Chanels of being the murderers. Chanel #5's parents arrive and claim Gigi gave her to them to raise; they dislike her so much, they eagerly accepted Hester's suggestion to disown her. Hester presents real evidence that Chanel #3 corresponded with her biological father, Charles Manson, who advised her to murder her friends, as well as fake evidence that #3 has a split personality who became #5's accomplice. Finally, Hester claims Chanel Oberlin joined the plot in order to purge Kappa of undesirable pledges. A disguised Hester appears in security footage supposedly showing Chanel buying murder weapons. Denise and deputized male strippers arrest the Chanels.

=== May 2016 ===
By the end of spring semester, the characters have moved on with their lives. Chad and Denise date, but Denise breaks Chad's heart by leaving him to undertake FBI training at Quantico. Chad starts a charity memorializing the deceased Dickie Dollar Scholars. Dean Munsch becomes a bestselling author and media sensation with her ghostwritten book, "New New Feminism." She confronts Hester over her true identity and role in the murders, but Hester forces a stalemate with her knowledge that Munsch concealed Sophia Doyle's death and murdered her own ex-husband. Wes agrees to give Grace space and leaves for a vacation with Munsch. The Chanels are sentenced to a mental asylum, where they all find fulfilment; Sadie (#3) embraces her lesbianism by dating a nurse, a medicated Libby (#5) is tolerable and becomes Chanel's best friend, and Chanel is happier away from the influence of social media and boys. Chanel is voted "house president," but wakes in bed one night and screams at the sight of the Red Devil holding a knife above her.

== Production ==
FOX originally ordered 15 episodes for the series' first season. They later changed it to 13 episodes, likely as a result of lower than expected ratings. Prior to the series' premiere, Murphy teases that only 4 of the main cast would survive. At the end of the season, only about three main characters died, and the rest of them survived.

== Reception ==
=== Ratings ===
"The Final Girl(s)", along with the previous episode "Dorkus" as the special two-hour season finale, was watched by a total of 2.53 million U.S. viewers and got a 0.9/3 rating/share in the 18-49 adult demographic.

=== Critical reception ===
The two-hour finale received mixed reviews from critics and audiences alike, with criticism aimed mostly towards the reveal of the final "Red Devil" killer. The A.V. Club's LaToya Ferguson rated the episode along with "Dorkus" and gave it a C rating, criticizing it for drawing out the reveal and for putting too much focus on the least interesting characters.
