= Tyler Shields =

American photographer, screenwriter, director and inline skater

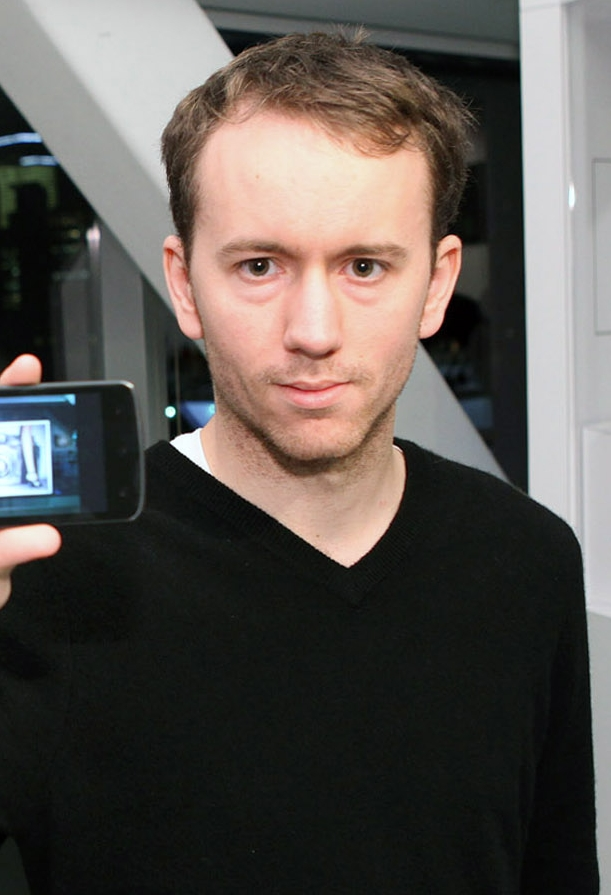
- Shields in December 2011
- Born: April 29, 1982 (age 44); Jacksonville, Florida, U.S.
- Occupations: Photographer; screenwriter; director; inline skater
- Website: www.tylershields.com

Tyler Shields (born April 29, 1982) is an American photographer, screenwriter, director, and former professional inline skater. Shields is known for his provocative photography involving violence and danger.

Shields gained additional notoriety in June 2017 for a photo of comedian Kathy Griffin holding a prop that looked like Donald Trump's severed head.

== Life and career ==
Shields was born in Jacksonville, Florida.

=== Inline skating ===
Shields competed professionally as a vert inline skater. He participated in the 1999 and 2000 X Games and toured with Tony Hawk in 2003.

=== Photography ===
Shields credits Fraser Kee Scott of A Gallery with discovering him, stating, "I have a lot of friends that are Scientologists ... Fraser [Kee Scott], the guy who runs that gallery, he found me back in the MySpace days. He is a very, very fucking smart guy and he has a great eye for things. He worked at my last gallery and to my knowledge he wasn't promoting Scientology to anybody, he was trying to sell art."

In August 2009, Shields participated in a photoshoot with The Vampire Diaries cast members Nina Dobrev, Candice Accola, Kayla Ewell and Sara Canning at Rumble Road Bridge, Smarr, Georgia. The group was arrested and charged with disorderly conduct after reports from the public sighted some of the members hanging off the bridge.

Shields has exhibited several series of photographs. In January 2016, Vanity Fair featured some of Shields' photographs of Colton Haynes and Emily Bett. Shields' series "Historical Fiction" [2015] featured a black man hanging a KKK member. The series covered events such as the deaths of James Dean, John F. Kennedy, Martin Luther King Jr., and Marilyn Monroe; the first men on the moon; and the break-up of The Beatles. In his 2014 series Provocateur, he had an alligator biting a crocodile bag. Another photograph from this series, Three Witches, was included as part of the Sotheby's auction in London. His photograph "Bunny" was featured in the Phillip's London auction.

Some observers, including Henry Leutwyler, art critic Paddy Johnson, and writer/photographer Jamie Lee Curtis Taete, have said that Tyler Shields takes other artists' concepts and passes them off as his own.

Tyler Shields has written two books of photography. His first photography book, The Dirty Side of Glamour, was released in November 2013 and published by Harper Collins' subsidiary Dey Street Books. His second book, Provocateur, was published in January 2017.

Shields' work often involves images of violence and danger. He collected blood from 20 celebrities to make a piece of art for his Life Is Not a Fairytale exhibit in Los Angeles and also photographed Lindsay Lohan as a vampire for that exhibit. In 2010, Shields photographed Lohan in studio portraits brandishing a gun. Shields was criticized for a photoshoot with Glee star Heather Morris with a bruised eye as making light of abusive treatment of women. His oeuvre has been criticized as copying other photographers' work. In 2017, Shields' photograph of Kathy Griffin holding a "bloody head resembling" U.S. President Donald Trump's face caused an uproar, causing both Donald Trump Jr. and Chelsea Clinton to denounce the act. Griffin later criticized Shields for refusing to grant her the photograph's copyright, as well as the comparatively minor amount of public criticism experienced by Shields compared to herself, which Griffin attributed to sexism.

In 2010, Shields was brought on as a co-founder and photography editor by The Printed Blog.

=== Filmmaking ===
On December 15, 2014, Shields' script The Wild Ones was featured in the Black List, an annual list of the most well-liked unproduced screenplays. Shields directed the 2015 action thriller film Final Girl, which starred Abigail Breslin.

On April 14, 2025, Shields released at Lincoln Square Chapter 51, reported to be the first film to use all major motion picture film format in existence.

== Filmography ==
- Final Girl (2015)
- Chapter 51 (2025)
