= Papa's Goods =

- Sons of Anarchy episode
- Episode no.: Season 7 Episode 13
- Directed by: Kurt Sutter
- Written by: Kurt Sutter
- Cinematography by: Paul Maibaum
- Editing by: Paul Fontaine
- Original air date: December 9, 2014
- Running time: 71 minutes

Guest appearances
- CCH Pounder as Tyne Patterson (special guest star); Annabeth Gish as Althea Jarry (special guest star); Peter Weller as Charles Barosky (special guest star); Michael Ornstein as Chuck Marstein; Winter Ave Zoli as Lyla Winston; Emilio Rivera as Marcus Alvarez; Michael Beach as T.O. Cross; Billy Brown as August Marks; Rusty Coones as Rane Quinn; Mo McRae as Tyler; Jacob Vargas as Allesandro Montez; Olivia Burnette as Homeless Woman; Ivo Nandi as Oscar El Oso Ramos; Bob McCracken as Brendan Roarke; Walton Goggins as Venus Van Dam (special guest star); Michael Chiklis as Milo (special guest star); Scott Anderson as Connor Malone; Jason Barry as Declan

Episode chronology
← Previous "Red Rose"	Next → —

"Papa's Goods" is the thirteenth and final episode of the seventh season of Sons of Anarchy. Written and directed by series creator Kurt Sutter, it first aired on December 9, 2014 in the United States on FX and served as the series finale.

== Plot ==
Jax is excommunicated from the M.C. by choice after killing abel and ties up loose ends by killing August Marks and Charles Barosky. Chibs then becomes President of SAMCRO and the club votes for Jax to meet "Mr. Mayhem" (execution), but allows him to leave by staging an escape. Jax leads law enforcement on a massive chase on his father’s bike on the interstate. Closing his eyes with a smile, and bracing himself for death, Jax collides with a semi-truck head on, dying in the exact same way and place as his father did before him.

== Reception ==
The review aggregator website Rotten Tomatoes reports an 88% approval rating with an average rating of 8.90/10, based on 17 reviews. The site's critical consensus reads: "A long, winding, and turbulent journey, similar to Sons of Anarchy itself, 'Papa's Goods' is a fitting end to Sutter's uncompromising vision of Jax and the SAMCRO gang." In a review by Diana Steenbergen for IGN, the series finale received a 9.5|10 rating; stating "Sons of Anarchy went out on a high note, managing to tie up the loose ends of the story in typically bloody fashion, while also delivering an emotionally charged goodbye to the characters. Jax attained a measure of redemption as he paid for his actions in a way that left his family – both his kids and the members of SAMCRO – with hope for a better life in the future. What more could you ask for?" Dalton Ross of Entertainment Weekly said of the episode: "The finale was a fitting and unpredictable final chapter to a season in which creator Kurt Sutter dared us to continue rooting for the main protagonist, even as that protagonist did terrible things."

Christine Orlando of TV Fanatic said about the conclusion of the series: "When I finally saw an episode, I wouldn't dare miss another. At times horrifying, often gut wrenching but always entertaining, Sons of Anarchy will be missed." Meanwhile Leigh Kolb of Vulture said; "'Papa's Goods' -- at almost two hours -- is a powerful end to seven seasons of revenge, lust, mayhem, glimmers of humor, and, perhaps most important, humanity".
