= Heart of Champions =

- Theatrical release poster
- Directed by: Michael Mailer
- Written by: Vojin Gjaja
- Produced by: Michael Shannon; Byron Wetzel; Lucas Jarach; Frank Buchs; Robert Ogden Barnum
- Starring: Michael Shannon; Alexander Ludwig; Charles Melton; David James Elliott; Ash Santos
- Cinematography: Edd Lukas
- Music by: Julian Scherle
- Production company: Construction Film
- Distributed by: Vertical Entertainment
- Release date: October 29, 2021
- Country: United States
- Language: English
- Budget: $6.4 million
- Box office: $37,000

Heart of Champions (also known as Pressure Point in Australia and the United Kingdom, and Swing in Germany, also its working title) is a 2021 American sports drama film directed by Michael Mailer, from a screenplay by Vojin Gjaja. It stars Michael Shannon, Alexander Ludwig, Charles Melton, David James Elliott and Ash Santos.

The film was released on October 29, 2021 by Vertical Entertainment. The film follows the rowing team of a fictional Ivy League university as they aim to win the national championship under the tutelage of a new coach, a Vietnam veteran.

== Cast ==
- Michael Shannon as Jack Murphy
- Alexander Ludwig as Alex Singleton
- Charles Melton as Chris Davenport
- David James Elliott as Mr. Singleton
- Ash Santos as Nisha
- Alex MacNicoll as John Kimball
- Michael Tacconi as Ted Taylor
- Andrew Creer as M.J. Carter
- David Cade as Jeff Lance
- Anton Hedayat as Tom Diverlinksi
- Jon Lemmon as Jake Pimczech
- Spencer Squire as Ben Anders
- Devin Woodson as Yates Sanchez
- Thomas Kasp as Logan
- Lilly Krug as Sara
- Caroline Cole as Lili
- Lance E. Nichols as Jack Harris

== Production ==
In May 2019, it was announced Michael Shannon had joined the cast of the film, with Howard Deutch directing from a screenplay by Vojin Gjaja, Shannon will also serve as a producer on the film. In October 2019, Alexander Ludwig and Charles Melton joined the cast of the film, with Michael Mailer replacing Deutch as director. In November 2019, David James Elliott joined the cast of the film.

Principal photography began in Louisiana on November 2, 2019, and concluded on December 3, 2019. Louisiana State University served as a main set for the film.

== Release ==
The film was released in select theatres on October 29, 2021 under a deal with Vertical Entertainment. It also became available on VOD services on November 19, 2021.

== Critical reception ==
On the review aggregator website Rotten Tomatoes, 29% of 17 critics' reviews are positive, with an average rating of 4.70/10.
