= Chapter 51 =

2025 film by Tyler Shields

- Theatrical release poster
- Directed by: Tyler Shields
- Written by: Tyler Shields
- Produced by: Tyler Shields; Giovanni Ribisi; Todd Mandel
- Starring: Colman Domingo; Abigail Breslin; Emily Alyn Lind; Charlotte Lawrence; Connor Paolo
- Cinematography: Tyler Shields
- Music by: Neuman Jody Mannas
- Production company: Artists For Artists
- Distributed by: Cineverse
- Release dates: April 14, 2025 (New York City); June 23, 2026 (United States)
- Running time: 97 minutes
- Country: United States
- Language: English

Chapter 51 is a 2025 American comedy thriller film written, directed, produced, and with cinematography by Tyler Shields. The film stars Colman Domingo, Abigail Breslin, Emily Alyn Lind, Charlotte Lawrence, and Connor Paolo. The film is set around the production of a film within a film titled Dissident and follows former FBI agent Thomas Scott as he investigates the "Hollywood Killer", who has murdered three actresses which were playing the same role.

Chapter 51 is notable for its use of a wide range of film gauges, film formats, film stocks, aspect ratios, and cinematographic systems to give its more than 20 depicted fictional films distinct visual identities. These included 8 mm film, 16 mm film, spherical and anamorphic format 35 mm film, VistaVision, Technirama, 65 mm film, Ultra Panavision 70, and IMAX 70 mm, as well as for the first time in cinema history, IMAX cameras equipped with prototype anamorphic lenses developed in collaboration with Panavision.

Chapter 51 premiered in New York City on April 14, 2025, before receiving a limited theatrical and digital release in the United States on June 23, 2026. The film received mixed reviews from critics, with commentary particularly noting its meta-fictional structure, ensemble cast, and experimental cinematography.

== Premise ==
The film centers on the production of Dissident, a $500 million high-profile film during which three actresses are murdered by an unidentified serial killer known as the "Hollywood Killer". As the killings disrupt the production and suspicion falls on those involved with the film, the murders become the subject of an unresolved investigation. Years later, former FBI agent Thomas Scott reexamines footage from the production and interviews those connected to the case in an attempt to identify the killer.

== Cast ==
- Tyler Shields as Thomas Scott, a former FBI agent who reopens the Hollywood Killer case.
- Colman Domingo as Christopher Demy
- Abigail Breslin as Ava Bergman
- Emily Alyn Lind as Effy Mankiewicz
- Charlotte Lawrence as Greata Daniels
- Connor Paolo as Christopher Pace

== Production ==
The film was executive produced by Kenan Thompson through his independent studio Artists for Artists, which supported Shields in developing and testing the film's visual approach. Giovanni Ribisi and Todd Mandel produced Chapter 51 alongside Shields, while John Ryan Jr., and Tyler Transki were among its executive producers. The film was produced by Artists For Artists and acquired for North American distribution by Cineverse.

Made with a small film crew, for the cinematography of Chapter 51, director Tyler Shields shot using multiple different film formats, film gauges, and camera systems to distinguish the film's more than 20 fictional film productions, including 8 mm film, 16 mm film, 35 mm film, VistaVision, Ultra Panavision 70, and IMAX 70mm film, in order to give each film a distinct visual style. In creating a new format, a prototype anamorphic format IMAX lens system was developed for the production following discussions between Shields and Panavision lens designer Dan Sasaki, which stretched the IMAX 70mm films native aspect ratio from 1.44:1 to 1.90:1. Sequences were also filmed using anamorphic lenses on VistaVision cameras, making Chapter 51 the first film to use the Technirama process since the 1960s. Shot on Kodak film, the film was additionally filmed using a variety of different film stocks, including contemporary stock, Vision2 200T, vintage film from the 1970s, and recanned unused film from The Matrix (1999). Sequences depicting silent films were photographed with a hand-cranked camera, while sequences based on large-format films of the 1950s and 1960s used Ultra Panavision cameras and lenses associated with films including Ben-Hur (1959) and Lawrence of Arabia (1962), as well as lenses previously used by director Stanley Kubrick. Overall, 140 sets of camera lenses were acquired for the production, only 40 of which were not used. The various formats were combined during editing producing variations in image texture, colour response and aspect ratios. Shields edited the film using Da Vinci Resolve and also created the films color grading, while Neuman Mannas served as the musical composer in his feature debut.

== Release ==
Chapter 51 premiered in New York City on April 14, 2025. The film was released for a theatrical limited release as well as digitally for video on demand on June 23, 2026.

It was screened in 'Òrbita' Section on 8 October 2026 at the 59th Sitges Film Festival.

== Reception ==
On review aggregation website Rotten Tomatoes, Chapter 51 has a rating of 64% based on 14 critics' reviews.
