= Peel (2019 film) =

2019 British comedy-drama film

- Film poster
- Directed by: Rafael Monserrate
- Written by: Lee Karaim; Troy Hall
- Produced by: David Hillary; Rafael Monserrate; Jeffrey Thal
- Starring: Emile Hirsch; Jack Kesy; Shiloh Fernandez; Jacob Vargas; Garrett Clayton
- Cinematography: Michael Alden Lloyd
- Edited by: Sharyn L. Ross
- Music by: Kathryn Kluge; Kim Allen Kluge
- Production companies: Head Gear Films; Living the Dream Films; Metrol Technology
- Distributed by: Sony Pictures Worldwide Acquisitions
- Release date: 7 February 2019 (Santa Barbara International Film Festival)
- Running time: 101 minutes
- Country: United Kingdom
- Language: English

Peel is a 2019 British comedy-drama film co-produced and directed by Rafael Monserrate and starred by Emile Hirsch. The movie was first shown on 7 February 2019 at the Santa Barbara International Film Festival.

== Plot ==
When his overprotective mother dies, 30-year-old Peel Munter is left to fend for himself for the first time in his life. The good-hearted but profoundly unworldly Peel now has to learn to navigate the outside world and takes in a colorful bunch of housemates to help pay the mortgage. With their help, he even embarks on a quest to reconnect with his long-lost brothers, eventually finding closure for the sense of loss he has carried since childhood.

== Cast ==
- Emile Hirsch as Peel Munter
- Jack Kesy as Roy, Peel's first housemate
- Shiloh Fernandez as Sam, Peel's brother
- Jacob Vargas as Chuck, the 2nd housemate
- Garrett Clayton as Chad, the 3rd housemate
- Amy Brenneman as Lucille, Peel's mother
- Troy Hall as Will, Peel's older brother
- Yaya DaCosta as Sarah, Will's wife
- Angelina Joo as Chun Ja, Peel's friend
- Hana Hwang as Jooeun, Chun Ja's cousin

== Reception ==
Noel Murray from the LA Times wrote: "The problem is that "Peel" is so persistently twee that when it tries to introduce heavier themes - involving the lasting damage family and friends thoughtlessly inflict on each other - the general sense of unreality gets in the way." Roger Moore from the website "Movie Nation" gave the movie only 1.5 stars out of 4, stating: "Hirsch is a gifted comic actor and could have made a lot more out of this unworldly guy who draws and snorkels obsessively and gets his hair cut about as often as Johnny Depp. And no, a few sweet moments in the final act don't paper over the emptiness that precedes them. "Peel" is just as its title suggests, a movie that's all surface peel and no substance."
