= Alexander Ludwig =

Canadian actor (born 1992)

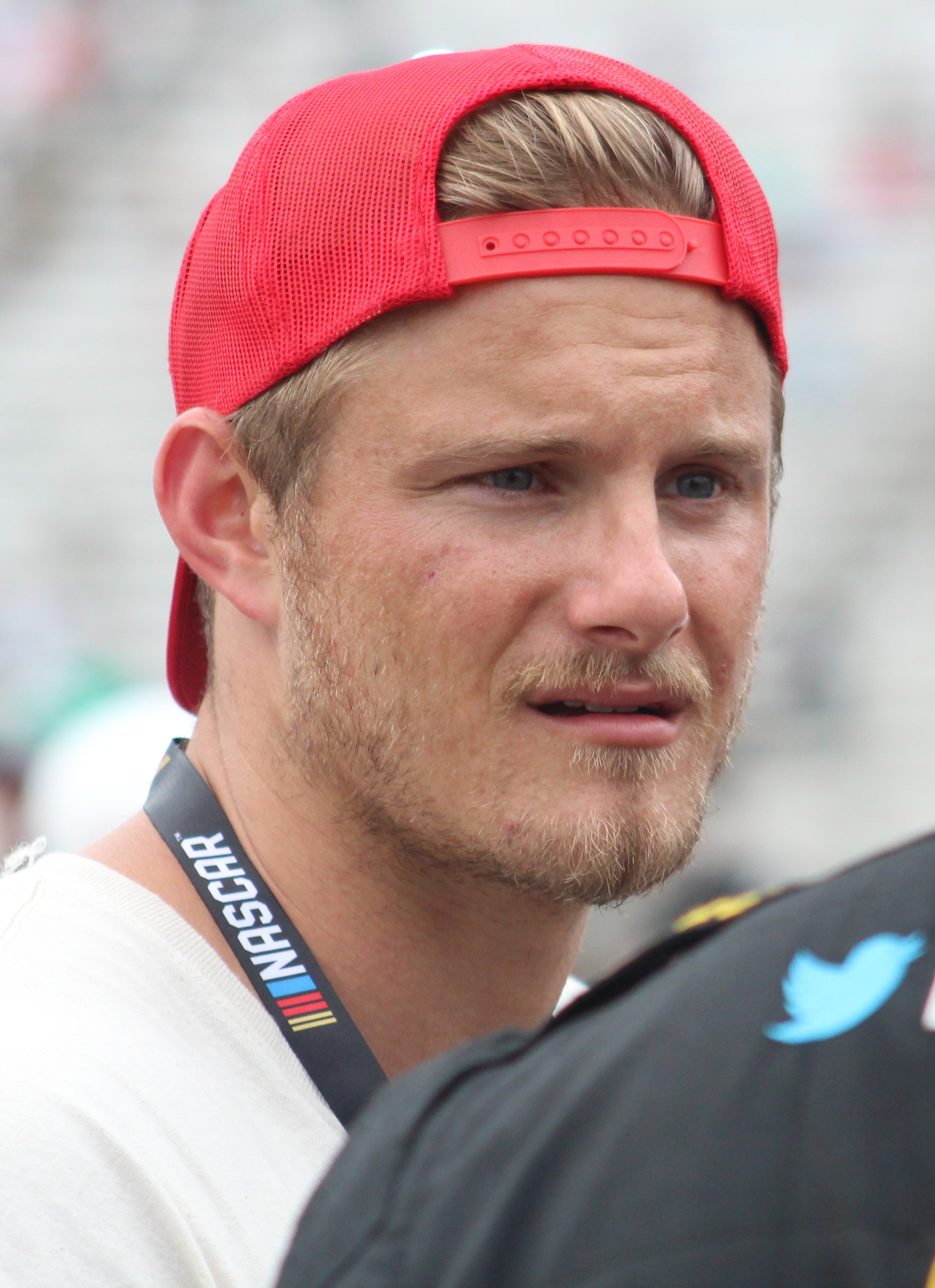
- Ludwig in 2021
- Born: Alexander Richard Ludwig; May 7, 1992 (age 34); Vancouver, British Columbia, Canada
- Education: University of Southern California (dropped out)
- Occupations: Actor; singer-songwriter
- Years active: 2000–present
- Height: 6 ft 2 in (1.88 m)
- Spouse: Lauren Dear (m. 2020)
- Children: 2

Alexander Richard Ludwig (born May 7, 1992) is a Canadian actor and country musician. He first began his career as a child, and then received recognition as a teenager for starring in the films The Seeker: The Dark Is Rising (2007), Race to Witch Mountain (2009) and he is also known for starring as Cato in The Hunger Games (2012).

He is also known for his supporting roles as Shane Patton in Lone Survivor (2013), Christopher "Chris" Ryan in When the Game Stands Tall (2014), Jameson in Final Girl (2015), Dorn in Bad Boys for Life (2020), Alex Singleton in Heart of Champions (2021), Sgt. Declan O'Brady in Guy Ritchie's The Covenant (2023), Bad Boys: Ride or Die (2024) and Rome Archer in Marked Men: Rule + Shaw (2025). He starred as legendary Viking Björn Ironside in the History Channel series Vikings (2014–2020) and had a lead role in the Starz drama series Heels (2021–2023). As a musician, Ludwig released his debut album Highway 99 via BBR Music Group on August 26, 2022.

== Early life ==
Alexander Richard Ludwig was born in Vancouver, British Columbia, Canada, to Sharlene (née Martin), a former actress, and Harald Horst Ludwig, a businessman and former co-chair of Lionsgate Entertainment. He has three younger siblings. Ludwig was drawn to the profession, saying in an interview, "I have a big imagination. I love performing."

Despite his mother's early career as an actress, Ludwig had to convince his parents to support his desire to pursue acting as a child. His parents believed that child actors "can get sucked into a life that isn't reality." They prioritized education, and so he attended regular school while pursuing his acting dreams. "It was definitely challenging to juggle school while filming," he reflected in the same interview. "My school wasn't used to it, and I wasn't used to it. It was the most amazing experience, but it was really hard." Ludwig studied at the University of Southern California (but left before graduating), where he was in the Phi Kappa Psi fraternity.

== Career ==
Ludwig began his career at the age of nine when he featured in a Harry Potter toy commercial, a job that enabled him to sign on with an agent and obtain more commercial work. Later he was cast in movies such as Air Bud: World Pup (2000), MXP: Most Extreme Primate (2003), Scary Godmother: The Revenge of Jimmy (2005), Eve and the Fire Horse (2005), The Sandlot: Heading Home (2007).

In addition to cinema, Ludwig has also worked in television. He has performed in movies made for television, such as A Little Thing Called Murder (2006), and television series such as The Dead Zone. Ludwig obtained his leading role in The Seeker: The Dark Is Rising (2007) after a "gruelling audition process." By his count, he had 16 auditions before being cast. Ludwig was in Grown Ups 2 with Adam Sandler.

Ludwig's next lead role came in the part of Seth – one half of a teenage, alien brother-sister duo – in the film production of Race to Witch Mountain (2009), also starring Dwayne Johnson. Seth is the part originated by Ike Eisenmann in the 1975 original, Escape to Witch Mountain. The film opened at number one at the box office the weekend that it premiered, with receipts estimated at $25 million. Despite his early casting success with The Seeker, Ludwig indicated in an interview that it was his intention to attend university. In another interview, the actor said that the most challenging thing about filming The Seeker was trying "to juggle school while filming." He stated: "My school wasn't used to it, and I wasn't used to it. It was the most amazing experience, but it was really hard."

In the movie adaptation of The Hunger Games, Ludwig played Cato, the fierce male tribute from District 2, the primary threat to the protagonists' lives during the 74th Hunger Games. The film was released worldwide on March 23, 2012. Ludwig won the award for Best Fight on 2012 MTV Movie Awards along with Jennifer Lawrence and Josh Hutcherson, as well as the award for Best Villain at the 2012 Teen Choice Awards. Ludwig released his first single "Liv It Up (Teenage Wasteland)" on March 1, 2012.

In 2013, he co-starred in the films Lone Survivor and Grown Ups 2. In 2014, he became a part of the main cast of the popular TV series Vikings, playing the character of Björn Ironside, the son of Ragnar Lothbrok and Lagertha. In 2015, he had the male lead in both the horror films Final Girl and The Final Girls, which are unrelated to each other. He played the pacifist hacker Dorn in 2020's Bad Boys for Life, and also appeared in The Band Perry's music video for "Gentle on My Mind" alongside Teen Wolf actress Shelley Hennig.

Ludwig signed with the country music label BBR Music Group/BMG in May 2021. His self-titled EP was released on May 21, 2021. On August 18, 2022, it was announced that Ludwig would appear in Nicki Minaj's music video for her single Super Freaky Girl. On August 26, 2022, Ludwig released his debut album Highway 99.

== Personal life ==
Ludwig was a competitive freestyle skier, and has participated in skydiving. In February 2019, Ludwig disclosed issues he experienced with depression, anxiety, alcoholism, and substance abuse starting at the age of 14.

In 2020, he married Lauren Dear. After suffering three miscarriages, Dear gave birth to their first child, a daughter, on April 27, 2023. They had a second child, a son, on June 12, 2024.

== Filmography ==
=== Film ===
Year	Title	Role	Notes
2000	Air Bud: World Pup	Actor	Uncredited
2004	MXP: Most Xtreme Primate	Child	Direct-to-video
2005	Scary Godmother: The Revenge of Jimmy	Jimmy	Voice
2005	Eve and the Fire Horse	Kevin	Uncredited
2006	A Little Thing Called Murder	Young Kenny Kimes	
2007	The Sandlot: Heading Home	E.J. Needman	Direct-to-video
2007	The Seeker: The Dark Is Rising	Will Stanton	
2009	Race to Witch Mountain	Seth	
2012	The Hunger Games	Cato	
2013	Grown Ups 2	Braden Higgins	
2013	Lone Survivor	PO2 Shane Patton	
2014	When the Game Stands Tall	Chris Ryan	
2015	Final Girl	Jameson	
2015	The Final Girls	Chris Briggs	
2015	Blackway	Nate	
2019	Midway	Lieutenant Roy Pearce	
2019	Recon	Marson	
2020	Bad Boys for Life	Dorn	
2020	Operation Christmas Drop	Captain Andrew Jantz	
2021	Night Teeth	Rocko	
2021	Heart of Champions	Alex Singleton	
2021	National Champions	Emmett Sunday	
2023	Guy Ritchie's The Covenant	Sgt. Declan O'Brady	
2024	Bad Boys: Ride or Die	Dorn	
2025	Marked Men: Rule + Shaw	Rome Archer	
2026	Unabomber	Leo Driver	
2026	Killing Castro	TBA	
TBA	Shiver †	TBA	Post-production
TBA	Night Comes †	TBA	Post-production
TBA	What the Fuck Is My Password †	TBA	Post-production
TBA	Hal †	Hal Donaldson	In production

=== Television ===
Year	Title	Role	Notes
2014–2021	Vikings	Björn Ironside	Main role (seasons 2–6)
2017	Swerve	Dr. Delucchi	Main role; 6 episodes
2021–2023	Heels	Ace Spade	Main role; 16 episodes
2024	Earth Abides	Isherwood "Ish" Williams	Main role; 6 episodes
TBA	The White Lotus †	TBA	Main role (season 4)

=== Music videos ===
Year	Song	Role	Artist
2014	"Gentle on My Mind"	Guy/Traveler	The Band Perry
2022	"Super Freaky Girl"	Ken	Nicki Minaj

== Discography ==
=== Studio albums ===
Title	Details
Highway 99	Release date: August 26, 2022; Label: BBR Music Group

=== Extended plays ===
Title	Details
Alexander Ludwig	Release date: May 21, 2021; Label: BBR Music Group

=== Singles ===
Year	Single	Peak chart positions	Album
Year	Single	CAN Country	Album
2022	"Let Me Be Your Whiskey"	38	Highway 99

== Awards and nominations ==
Year	Award	Category	Work	Result
2012	MTV Movie Awards	Best Fight (with Jennifer Lawrence and Josh Hutcherson)	The Hunger Games	Won
2012	Teen Choice Awards	Choice Movie: Villain	The Hunger Games	Won
2012	Teen Choice Awards	Choice Movie: Fight (with Jennifer Lawrence and Josh Hutcherson)	The Hunger Games	Nominated
2014	Razzie Awards	Worst Screen Combo (with cast)	Grown Ups 2	Nominated
2015	Golden Maple Awards	Best Actor in a TV series broadcast in the U.S	Vikings	Nominated
