= Sons of Anarchy season 7 =

Sons of Anarchy
- Season 7
- Region 1 DVD cover
- Starring: Charlie Hunnam; Katey Sagal; Mark Boone Junior; Dayton Callie; Kim Coates; Drea de Matteo; Tommy Flanagan; David LaBrava; Niko Nicotera; Theo Rossi; Jimmy Smits
- No. of episodes: 13

Release
- Original network: FX
- Original release: September 9 – December 9, 2014

Season chronology
- ← Previous; Season 6

The seventh and final season of the American television drama series Sons of Anarchy premiered on September 9, 2014, and concluded on December 9, 2014, after 13 episodes aired on cable network FX. Created by Kurt Sutter, it is about the lives of a close-knit outlaw motorcycle club operating in Charming, a fictional town in California's Central Valley. The show centers on protagonist Jackson "Jax" Teller (Charlie Hunnam), the President of the club, who begins questioning the club and himself after reading his father’s (the founder of SOA, who was murdered many years before) journal.

Sons of Anarchy is the story of the Teller-Morrow family of Charming, California, as well as other members of the Sons of Anarchy Motorcycle Club, Redwood Original (SAMCRO), their families, various Charming townspeople, allied and rival gangs, associates, and law agencies that undermine or support SAMCRO's legal and illegal enterprises.

== Plot ==
Jax struggles with his recent loss and turns himself into the authorities. While in jail, Jax makes decisions that radically alter the direction of the club and uses it to exact revenge for the death of his wife. Another member's death fuels the hate and lies created by Gemma and Juice, who are on the run and hiding from the club. After Jax learns the truth, he works to make things right with all parties involved. The series ends with Jax making the ultimate sacrifice to complete his part of the story of SAMCRO and fulfill his father's vision.

== Cast and characters ==
Sons of Anarchy is the story of the Teller-Morrow family of Charming, California, as well as the other members of Sons of Anarchy Motorcycle Club, Redwood Original (SAMCRO), their families, various Charming townspeople, allied and rival gangs, associates, and law agencies that undermine or support SAMCRO's legal and illegal enterprises.

=== Main cast ===
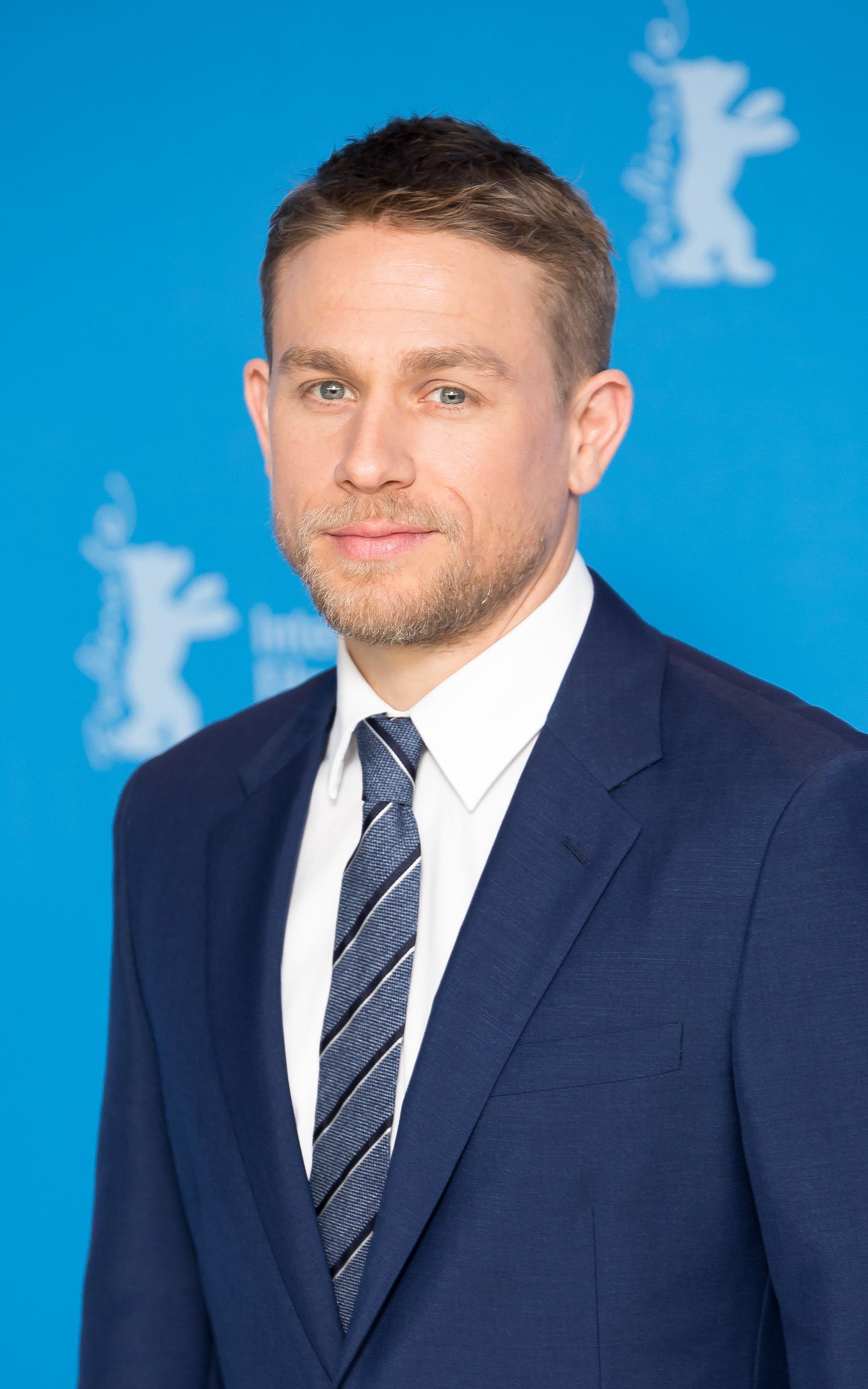
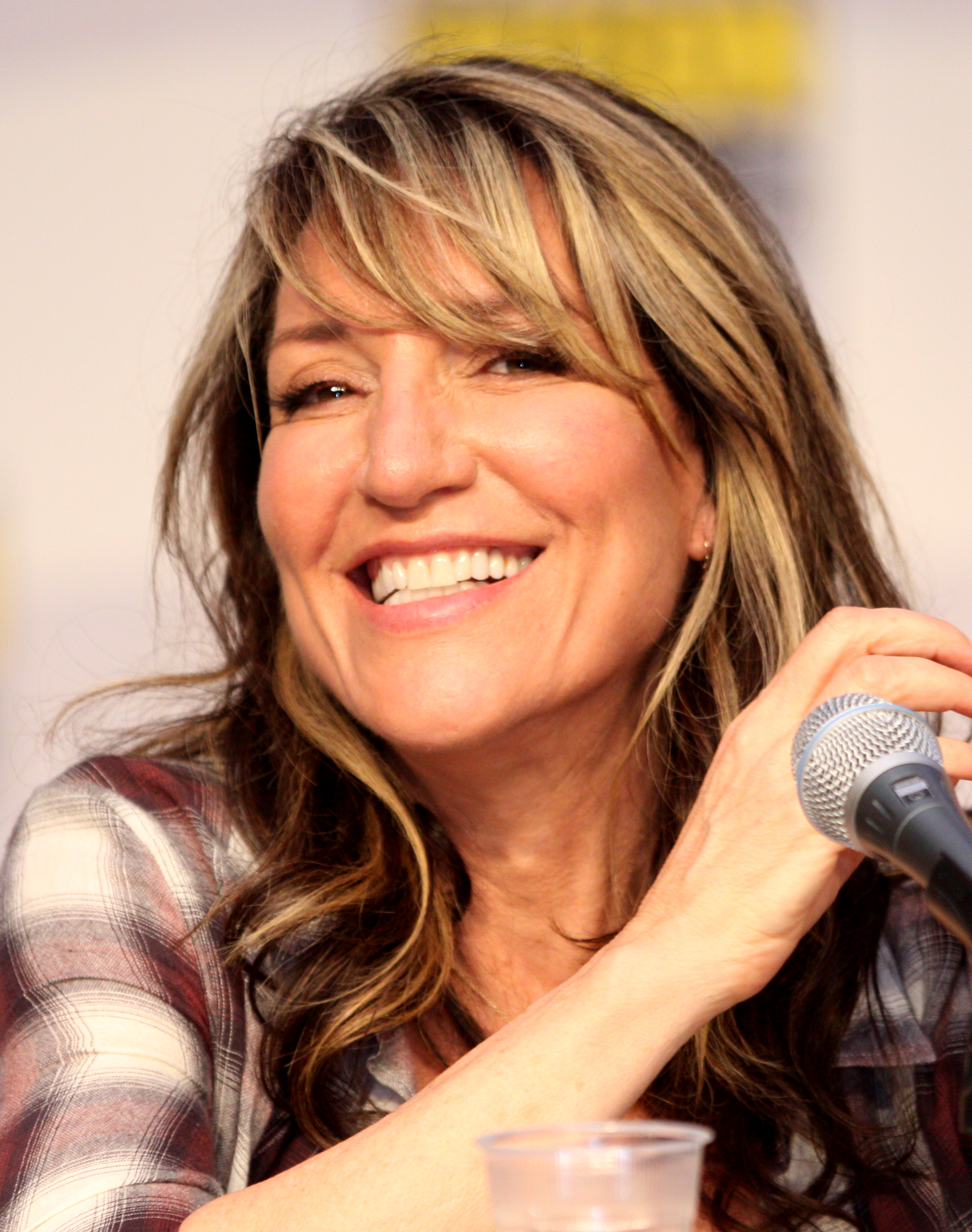
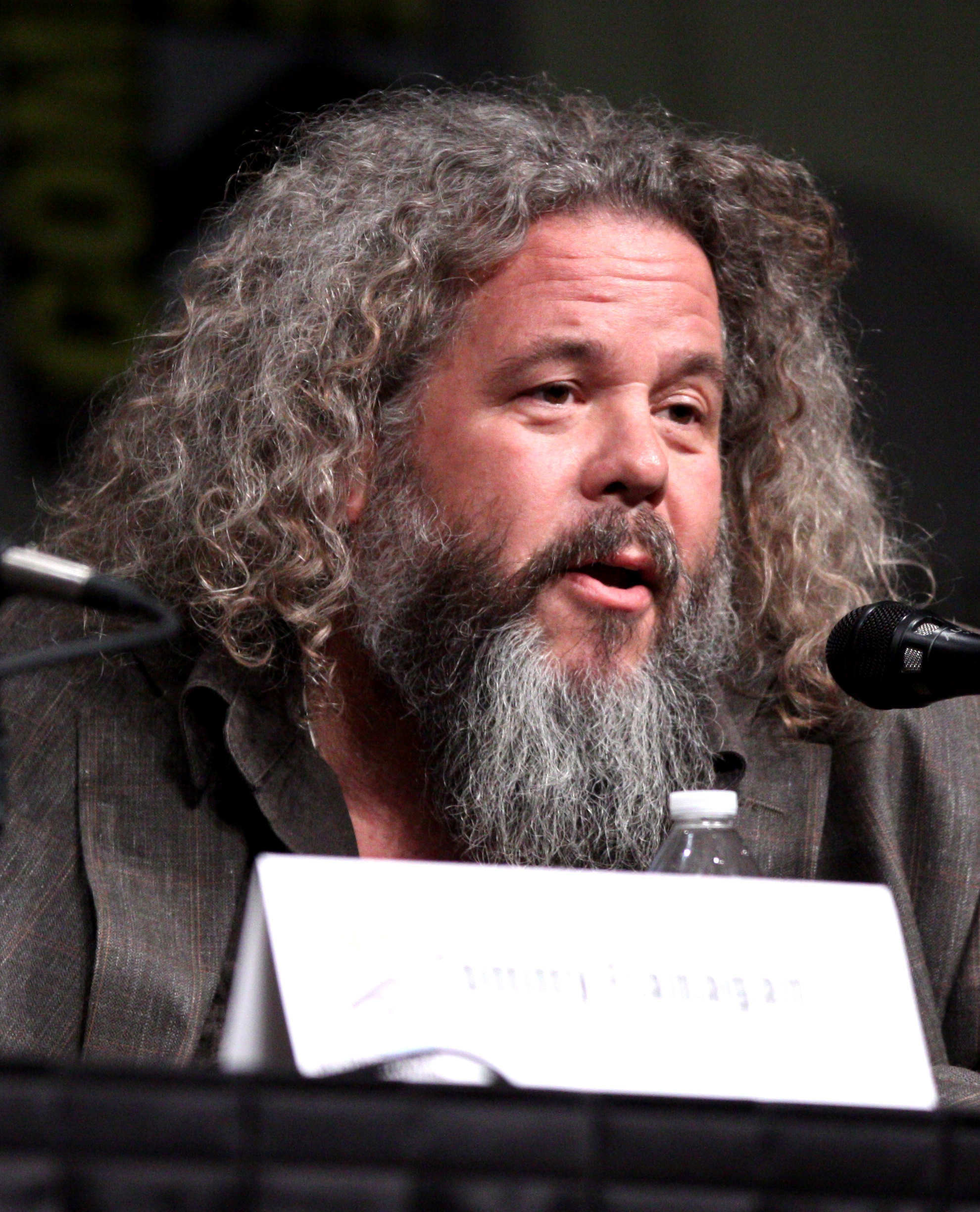
Charlie Hunnam (Jax Teller), Katey Sagal (Gemma Teller Morrow), and Mark Boone Junior (Bobby Munson)
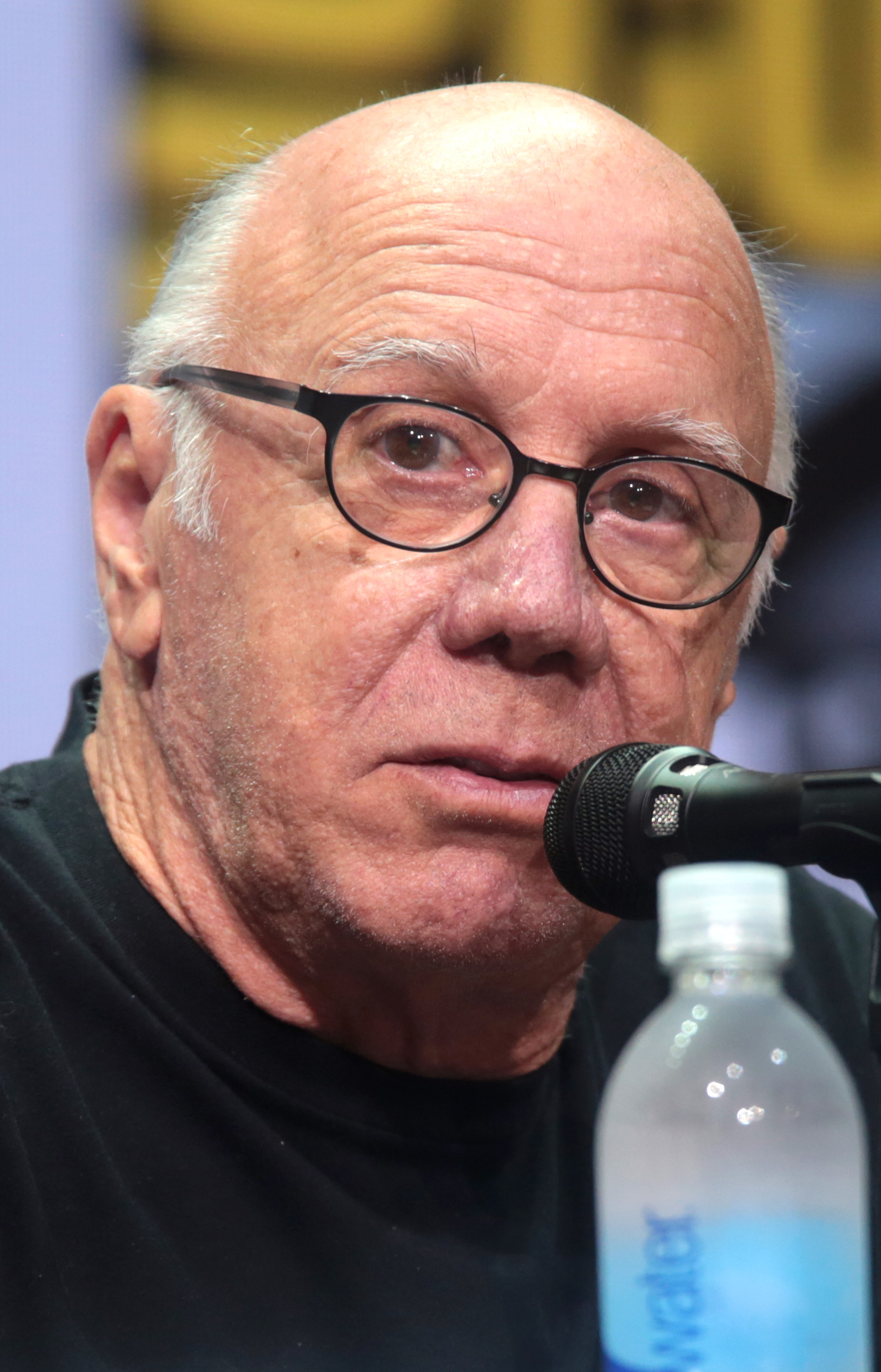
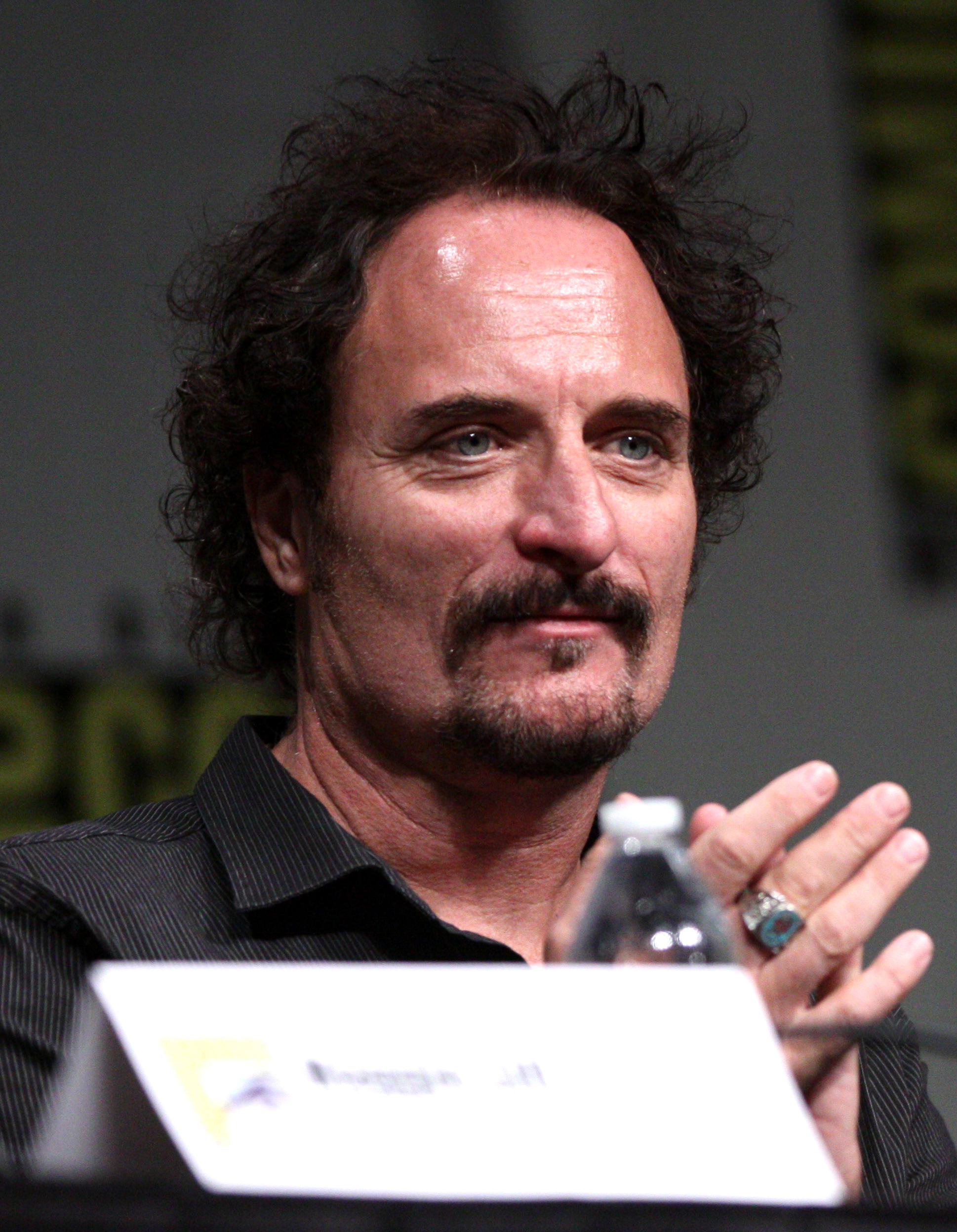
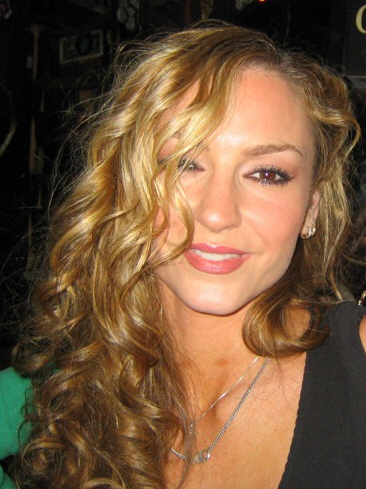
Dayton Callie (Wayne Unser), Kim Coates (Tig Trager) and Drea de Matteo (Wendy Case)
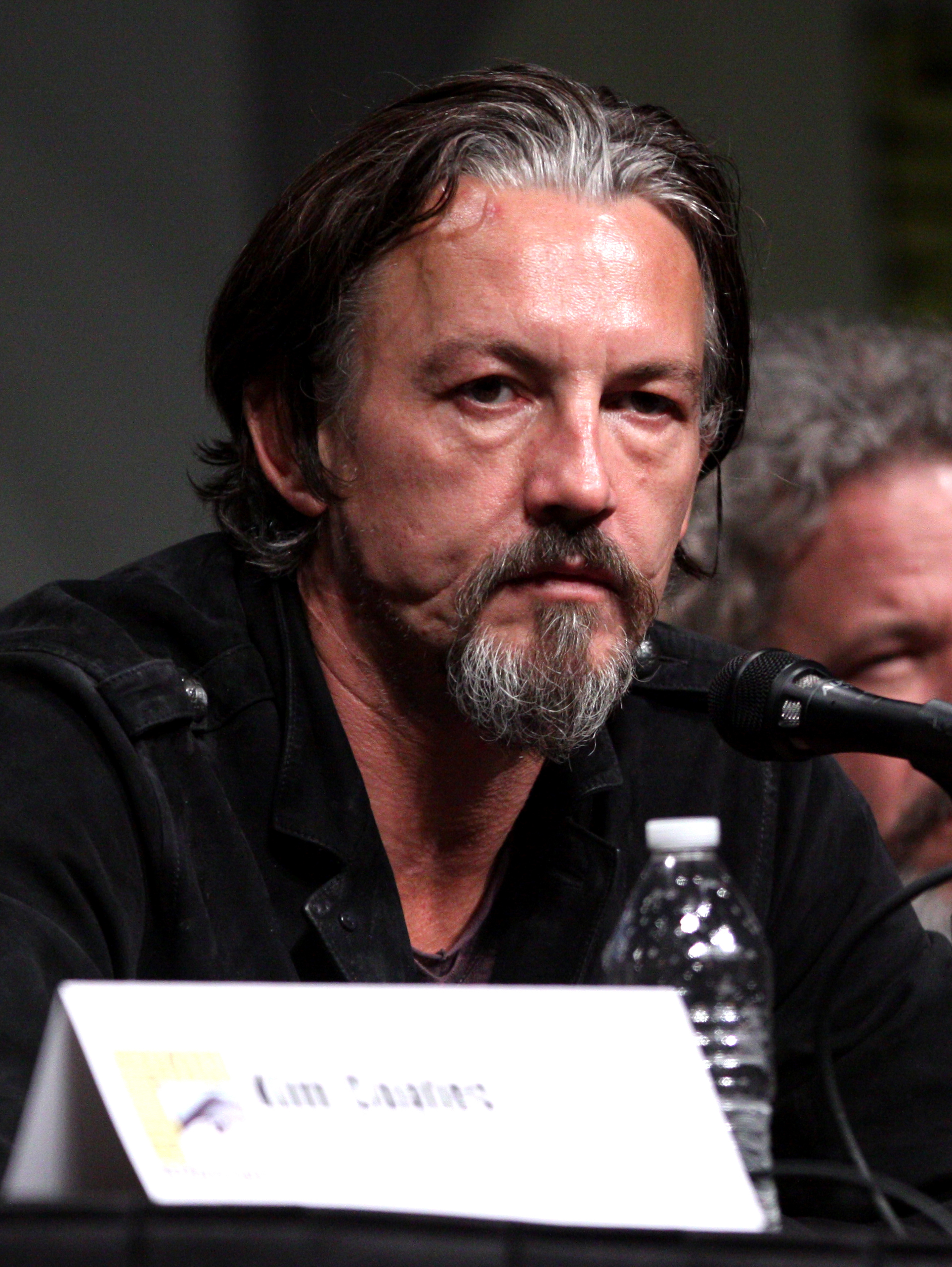
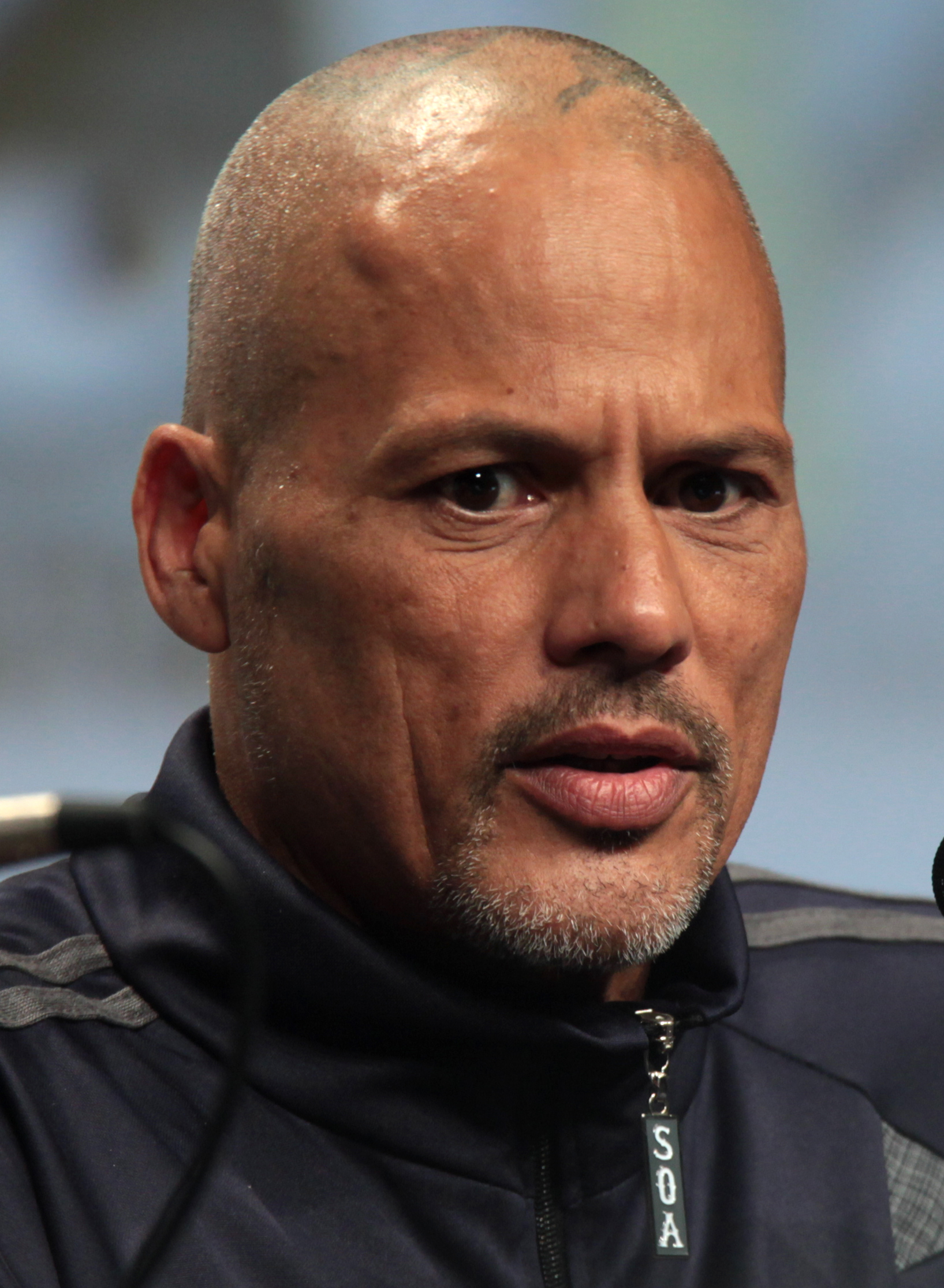
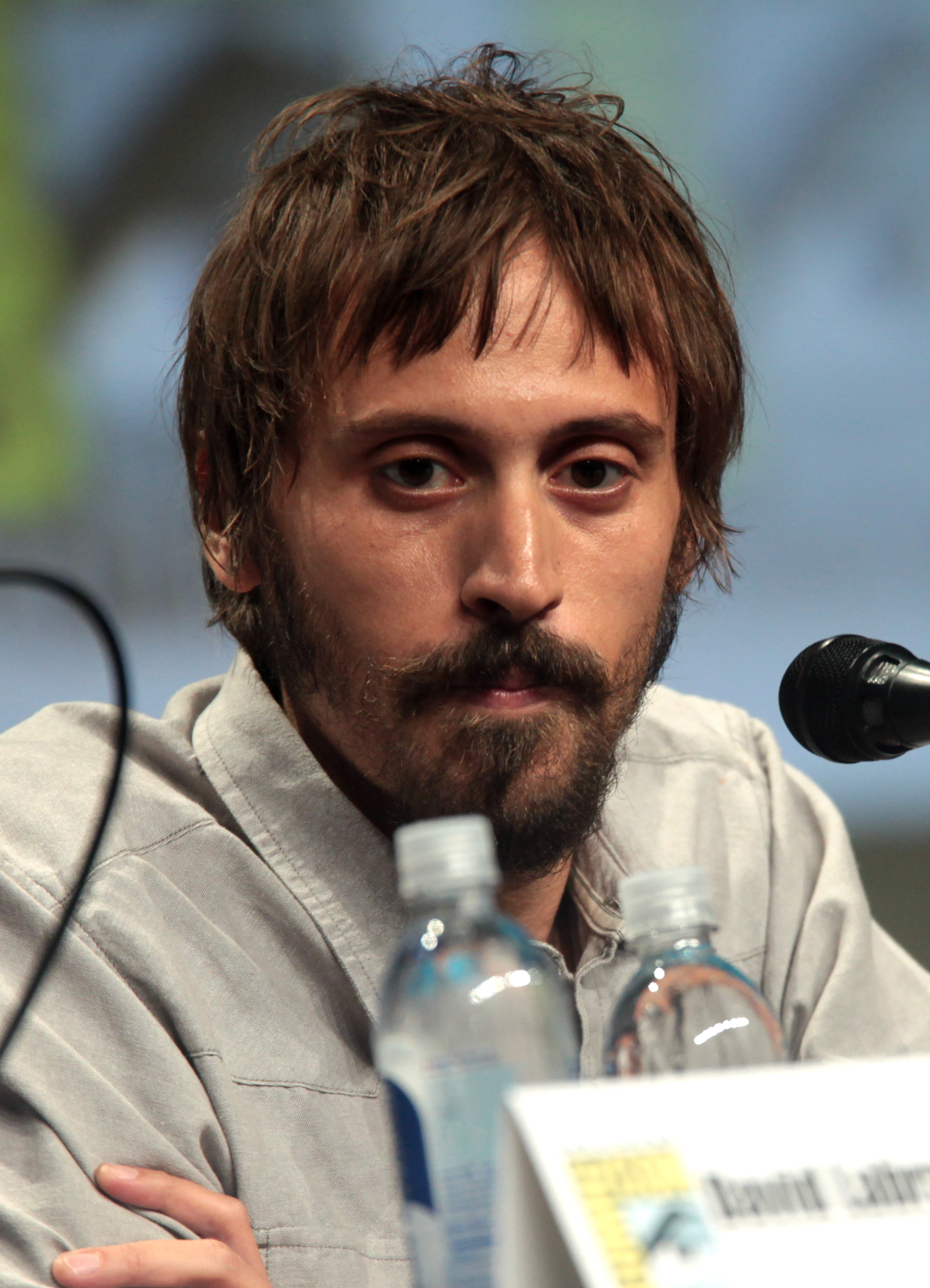
Tommy Flanagan (Chibs Telford), David Labrava (Happy Lowman), and Niko Nicotera (George "Ratboy" Skogstrom)
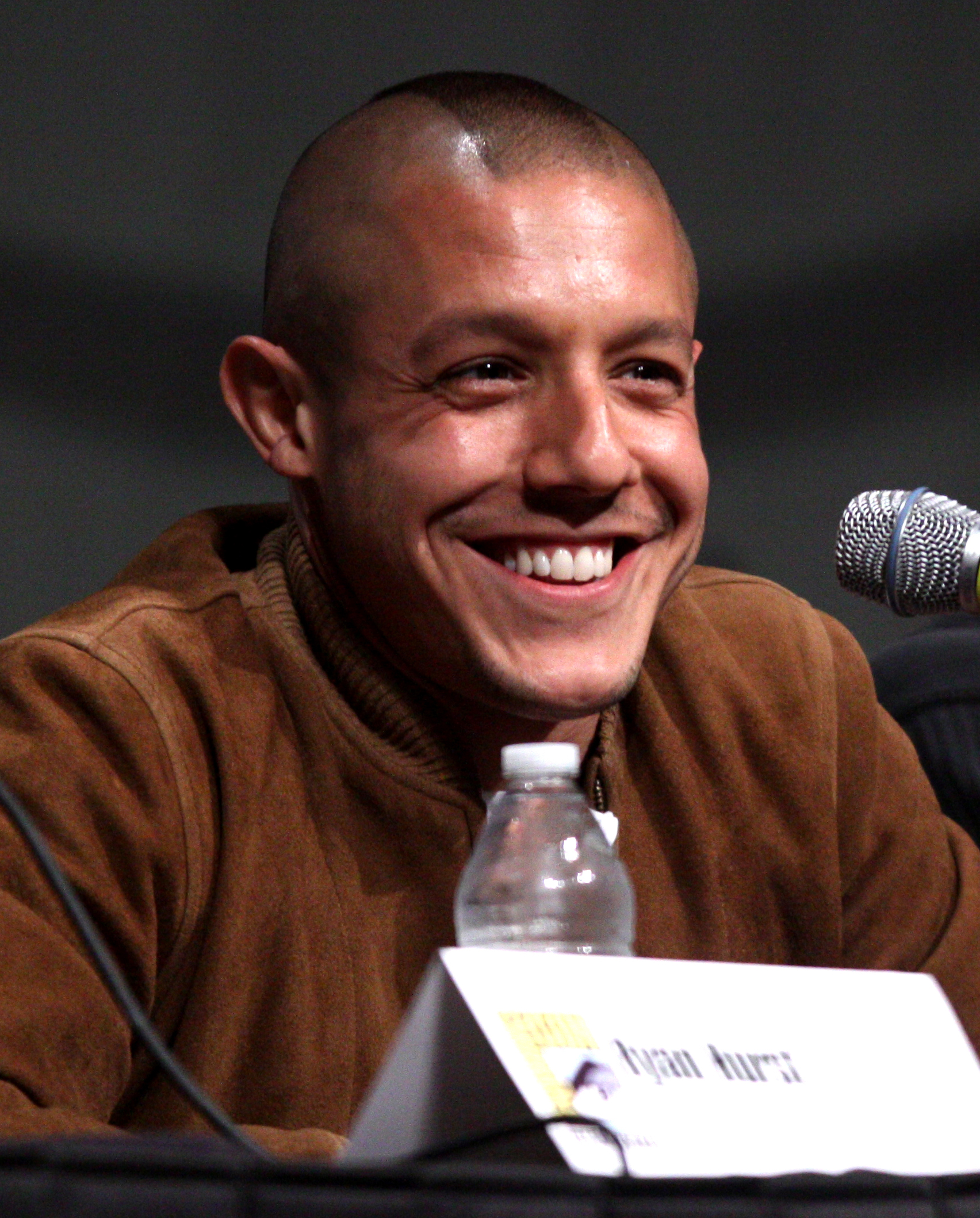
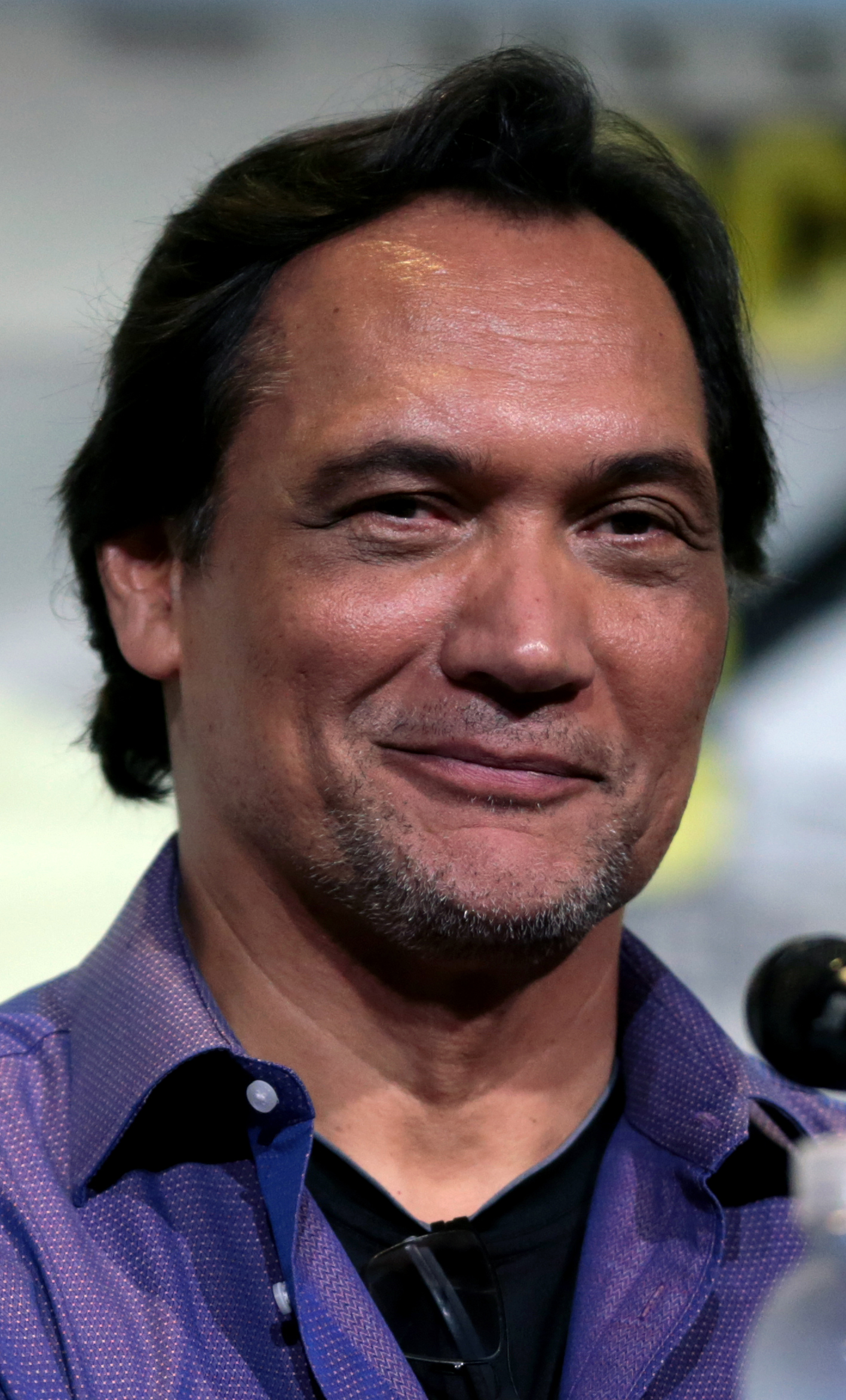
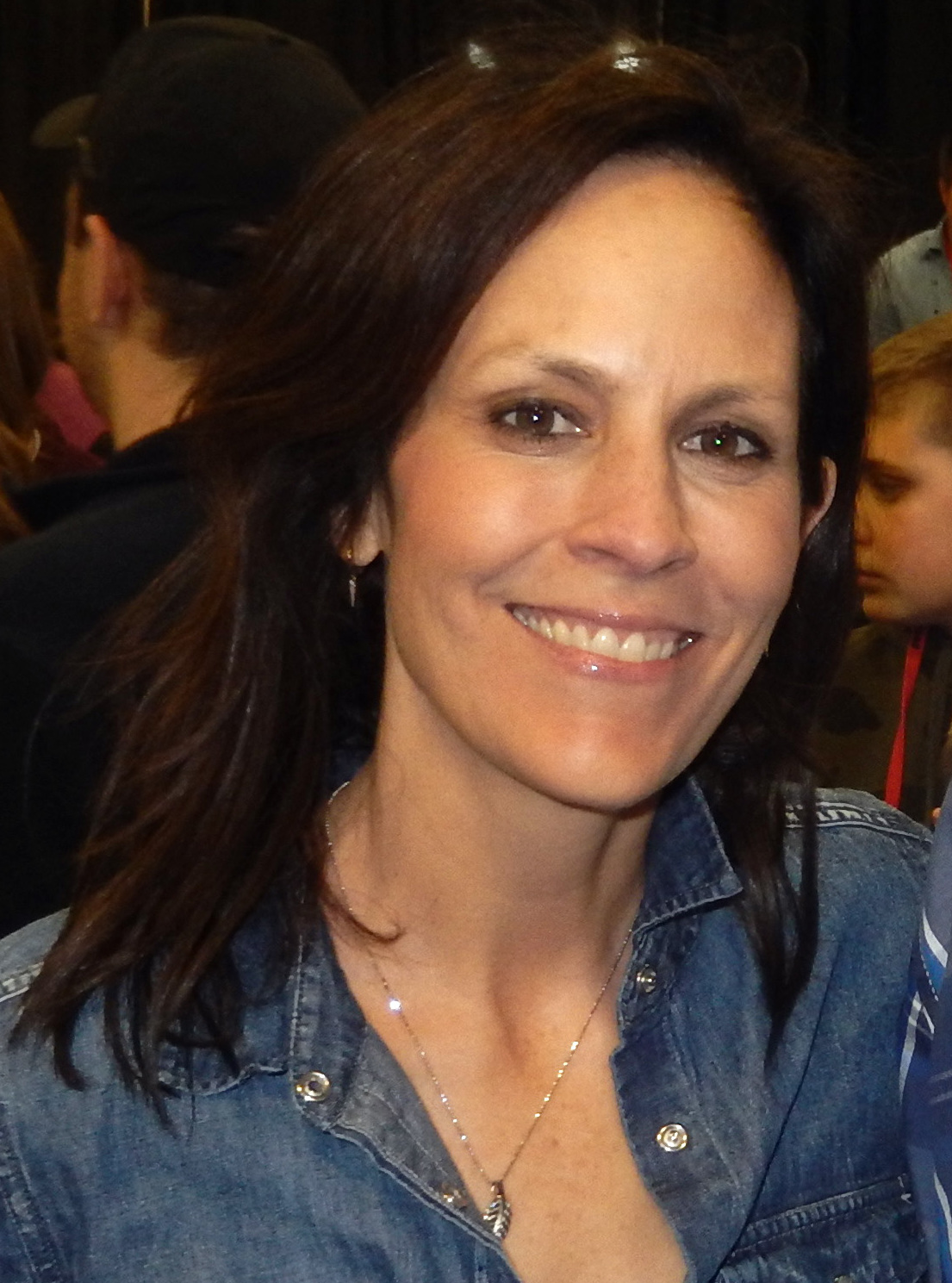
Theo Rossi (Juan-Carlos "Juice" Ortiz), Jimmy Smits (Nero Padilla), and Annabeth Gish (Althea Jarry)
- Charlie Hunnam as Jackson "Jax" Teller
- Katey Sagal as Gemma Teller Morrow
- Mark Boone Junior as Robert "Bobby Elvis" Munson
- Dayton Callie as Wayne Unser
- Kim Coates as Alex "Tig" Trager
- Drea de Matteo as Wendy Case
- Tommy Flanagan as Filip "Chibs" Telford
- David LaBrava as Happy Lowman
- Niko Nicotera as George "Rat Boy" Skogstorm
- Theo Rossi as Juan-Carlos "Juice" Ortiz
- Jimmy Smits as Nero Padilla

=== Special guest cast ===
- Annabeth Gish as Althea Jarry
- Kenneth Choi as Henry Lin
- Courtney Love as Ms. Harrison
- Peter Weller as Charles Barosky
- Walton Goggins as Venus Van Dam
- CCH Pounder as Tyne Patterson
- Michael Chiklis as Milo
- Robert Patrick as Les Packer

=== Recurring cast ===
- Rusty Coones as Rane Quinn
- Hayley McFarland as Brooke Putner
- Mo McRae as Tyler Yost
- Michael Ornstein as Chuck Marstein
- Jacob Vargas as Allesandro Montez
- Marilyn Manson as Ron Tully
- Winter Ave Zoli as Lyla Winston
- Ivo Nandi as Oscar "El Oso" Ramos
- Emilio Rivera as Marcus Alvarez
- April Grace as Loutreesha Haddem
- Arjay Smith as Grant McQueen
- Michael Beach as T.O. Cross
- Marya Delver as Officer Candy Eglee
- Mathew St. Patrick as Moses Cartwright
- Brad Carter as Leland Gruen
- Ron Yuan as Ryu Tom
- Billy Brown as August Marks
- Michael Shamus Wiles as Jury White
- Malcolm-Jamal Warner as Sticky
- Tony Curran as Gaines
- Douglas Bennet as Orlin West
- Kim Dickens as Colette Jane
- Reynaldo Gallegos as Fiasco
- Bob McCracken as Brendan Roarke
- Alan O'Neill as Hugh

=== Guest stars ===
- Inbar Lavi as Winsome
- Olivia Burnette as Homeless Woman
- Rick Misisco as Aryan Inmate
- Jenna Jameson as Porn Director
- Lea Michele as Gertie
- Alicia Coppola as Mildred Treal
- Hal Holbrook as Nate Madock
- Charisma Carpenter as Carol

== Production ==
Although Sons of Anarchy is set in Northern California's Central Valley, it is filmed primarily at Occidental Studios Stage 5A in North Hollywood. Main sets located there include the clubhouse, St. Thomas Hospital and Jax's house. The production rooms at the studio used by the writing staff also double as the Charming police station. External scenes are often filmed nearby in Sun Valley and Tujunga.

Sons of Anarchy was renewed for a seventh and final season that began airing in September 2014. Ron Perlman and Maggie Siff did not return, due to their characters being killed off at the end of season six. Drea de Matteo, David LaBrava and Niko Nicotera were all promoted to the regular cast. Robert Patrick, Emilio Rivera, and Billy Brown returned in their recurring guest roles, as did CCH Pounder, Peter Weller and Kim Dickens but only for limited appearances. Marilyn Manson guest starred as a drug addict who is a high-ranking member of a neo-Nazi prison sect. Malcolm-Jamal Warner joined the cast for a recurring role. Glee actress Lea Michele also had a guest role as a truck stop waitress and single mother in the sixth episode of the season. Former Buffy the Vampire Slayer/Angel actress Charisma Carpenter also had a guest role as an administrative director at a medical facility.

== Episodes ==
| No. overall | No. in season | Title | Directed by | Written by | Original release date | Prod. code | U.S. viewers (millions) |
|---|---|---|---|---|---|---|---|
| 80 | 1 | "Black Widower" | Paris Barclay | Kurt Sutter | September 9, 2014 | 7WAB01 | 6.20 |
In the wake of Tara's death, Jax makes vengeance a club priority. Meanwhile, Juice begins to hide from the club due to his actions.
| 81 | 2 | "Toil and Till" | Billy Gierhart | Charles Murray & Kurt Sutter | September 16, 2014 | 7WAB02 | 4.83 |
SAMCRO solicits help from another charter to get a messy job done. Also, Unser decides to investigate Tara's murder.
| 82 | 3 | "Playing with Monsters" | Craig Yahata | Peter Elkoff & Kurt Sutter | September 23, 2014 | 7WAB03 | 4.13 |
SAMCRO exploits an opportunity to secure an important alliance. Juice reaches out to Chibs, only to learn his actions are beyond redemption.
| 83 | 4 | "Poor Little Lambs" | Guy Ferland | Kem Nunn & Kurt Sutter | September 30, 2014 | 7WAB04 | 4.04 |
A past effort to help one ally leads to trouble with another. Also, retaliation from another club leads to deadly results.
| 84 | 5 | "Some Strange Eruption" | Peter Weller | Roberto Patino & Kurt Sutter | October 7, 2014 | 7WAB05 | 4.32 |
Looking for the source of a betrayal leads to violence at the Stockton Ports. Meanwhile, Gemma decides to take matters into her own hands.
| 85 | 6 | "Smoke 'em if You Got 'em" | Guy Ferland | Mike Daniels & Kurt Sutter | October 14, 2014 | 7WAB06 | 4.42 |
Jax takes advantage of shifting alliances to protect the MC and settle a score. Also, Juice seeks help from an old rival MC with an agenda of their own.
| 86 | 7 | "Greensleeves" | Paris Barclay | Gladys Rodriguez & Josh Botana & Kurt Sutter | October 21, 2014 | 7WAB07 | 4.29 |
In order to undermine a powerful club enemy, SAMCRO makes an uneasy alliance. Things take a turn for the worse when a core member of SAMCRO becomes the target of a new threat.
| 87 | 8 | "The Separation of Crows" | Charles Murray | Peter Elkoff & John Barcheski & Kurt Sutter | October 28, 2014 | 7WAB08 | 3.94 |
The club focuses on flushing out a rat with the search of a missing member at a standstill. Meanwhile, Jax has been hit with unexpected news regarding his father's death.
| 88 | 9 | "What a Piece of Work Is Man" | Peter Weller | Mike Daniels & Roberto Patino & Kurt Sutter | November 4, 2014 | 7WAB09 | 3.88 |
The club deals with heartache internally and conflict with the organization at large. Meanwhile, Unser and Jarry get closer to the truth about Tara's murder.
| 89 | 10 | "Faith and Despondency" | Paris Barclay | Kem Nunn & Gladys Rodriguez & Kurt Sutter | November 11, 2014 | 7WAB10 | 4.38 |
Love is in the air for SAMCRO members, but death wins the day. Abel causes circumstances that don't sit well with Jax and Gemma.
| 90 | 11 | "Suits of Woe" | Peter Weller | Peter Elkoff & Mike Daniels & Kurt Sutter | November 18, 2014 | 7WAB11 | 4.62 |
The SOA organization bears down on SAMCRO as Jax finally comes face to face with a heartbreaking truth regarding the death of Tara.
| 91 | 12 | "Red Rose" | Paris Barclay | Kurt Sutter & Charles Murray | December 2, 2014 | 7WAB12 | 5.05 |
With tensions mounting and truths finally revealed, Jax must make his ultimate decision. Meanwhile, Gemma pays a visit to an old family member, and Juice decides his own fate.
| 92 | 13 | "Papa's Goods" | Kurt Sutter | Kurt Sutter | December 9, 2014 | 7WAB13 | 6.40 |
Ghosts loom large as Jax makes the final moves to fulfill his father's legacy. Also, Jax makes it his mission to eliminate loose ends, as SAMCRO finally abolish their "unwritten bylaw".

== Reception ==
The last season received generally favorable reviews. At Metacritic, the season received a score of 68% based on reviews from 6 critics. On review aggregator website Rotten Tomatoes, it has an approval rating of 83% based on 186 reviews. The site's critical consensus reads: "The final season of Sons of Anarchy rides toward the series finale on its grounded characters and clearly defined storylines, without losing any of the show's bone-chilling action."

== Home media release ==
The season was released in the United States on DVD and Blu-ray on February 24, 2015.
