= Princess of the Row =

2019 American independent drama film

- Directed by: Max Carlson
- Written by: A. Shawn Austin; Max Carlson
- Produced by: A. Shawn Austin; Edi Gathegi
- Starring: Edi Gathegi; Tayler Buck; Ana Ortiz; Jacob Vargas; Martin Sheen
- Cinematography: Maz Makhani
- Edited by: Max Carlson
- Music by: Julian Scherle
- Production companies: Big Box Creative; Shifty Eye Productions; Revelations Entertainment.
- Distributed by: Gravitas Ventures
- Release dates: March 9, 2019 (Cinequest); November 27, 2020 (limited)
- Running time: 85 minutes
- Country: United States
- Language: English

Princess of the Row is a 2019 American independent drama film directed by Max Carlson, written by A. Shawn Austin and Max Carlson, produced by A. Shawn Austin, produced by Edi Gathegi, and starring Edi Gathegi, Tayler Buck, Ana Ortiz, Jacob Vargas and Martin Sheen. Morgan Freeman and Lori McCreary served as executive producers of the film.

== Cast ==
- Edi Gathegi as Beaumont "Bo" Willis
- Tayler Buck as Alicia Willis
- Ana Ortiz as Magdalene Rodriguez
- Jacob Vargas as Donald
- Martin Sheen as John Austin
- Blake Michael as Pete
- Tim Abell as Junk Yard Owner

== Release ==
The film premiered on March 9, 2019 as part of the Cinequest Film Festival. It also screened at the 2019 Portland Film Festival, where it won the award for Best Film.

== Reception ==
The film has an 88% rating on Rotten Tomatoes, based on 17 reviews with an average rating of 7.2/10. John DeFore of Hollywood Reporter said Princess of the Row is "an uneven but sincere portrait of filial devotion."
