= The Printed Blog =

American art magazine

- Official logo
- Editor-in-Chief: Joshua Karp
- Staff writers: Staff writers Hannah Faye; Beverly Kim
- Frequency: Monthly
- Circulation: 10,000
- Publisher: Joshua Karp
- First issue: January 27, 2009
- Company: John Swift Printing
- Country: United States
- Based in: Chicago
- Website: www.theprintedblog.com
- ISSN: 2164-9316

The Printed Blog is a print magazine composed entirely of blogs and other aggregated online content that operates out of its offices in Chicago.

Published monthly, It offers a wide range of content from the web, chosen by a team of staff and guest editors active in the fields of blogging and photography. If it's on the internet, you can find it in The Printed Blog which means that content ranges from music, to sex, to politics, to humanitarian issues, to pop culture commentary, to anything in between.

"Too much of the world is created for the lowest common denominator, and frankly, I'm tired of homogenized, dumbed down content, that I'm expected to enjoy because it was written to appeal to the masses. The Printed Blog is not for the lowest common denominator. If you're not impacted by our content — by a blog post or photograph — then we haven't done our jobs. If we don't lose a few subscribers each time we release an issue, it means that we were gutless and lazy."

== History ==
Founder Joshua Karp, a management consultant and entrepreneur, conceived The Printed Blog as a model for his vision of the future of print. Despite the common mentality that print was on its way out, Karp believed in his model enough to Initially fund the printing of the magazine personally. Working with interns to gather and assemble the content, Karp pressed on with the hope that the unique publication would soon attract enough advertising revenue or venture capitalist funding to continue.

Speaking of his inspiration, Karp said

"I think there are principles in the online world that work really well and can be applied to the offline world. If we look at a newspaper from the early 20th century compared to one published yesterday they look largely the same. One size fits all, quarter page ads, the half page ads are really expensive. The content is selected by a bunch of editors and journalists that cover beats. Their model hasn't changed, and my position is that the print newspaper doesn't need to go away simply because it's on paper. The problem with the print newspaper business...[is] that nobody has taken a hard look [at] how newspapers are pulled together and laid out and published, and how the power of community tools that we have now can enhance this."

The Printed Blog has gone through two incarnations since its initial conception.

=== Version 1.0 ===
The Printed Blog 1.0 was launched in Chicago and San Francisco in January 2009, and was originally modeled to be a free, advertiser-supported publication distributed at train stations.

With the hope of eventually increasing the production to twice a day, Karp and his team aimed to create a hyper-local reader experience — one where the content of the issues would be targeted even more specifically to focus on individual neighborhoods within the distribution cities.

The first issue appeared January 27, 2009, with the front page of the publication featuring a bondage-themed photograph below The Printed Blog logo and slogan "Tagline Would Actually Be Nice Here." Over the course of the morning, around 2,000 copies were handed out in Chicago outside the offices of the Chicago Tribune and various Chicago 'L' stops.

The New York Times featured an article about The Printed Blog as a promising start-up in January 2009, and even Time Out Chicago suggested in an article that if the business model worked, it could save print.

Despite the promise of the new format, and the large amount of media attention, The Printed Blog was unable to gain the necessary capital to keep it in business.

"Despite a significant personal investment on my part, and the additional support of six or seven credit cards, we were unable to raise the minimum amount of money required to reach the next stage of our development," Karp said." This was a difficult decision for us, but the financial reality of the situation demanded that we suspend further publication immediately, and indefinitely."

The Printed Blog 1.0 folded in July 2009, but not before distributing 80,000 tangible, and 100,000 digital copies of 16 issues.

=== Version 2.0 ===
The Printed Blog re-launched in August 2010 with a new business plan that swapped ad sales for a subscription based model. Instead of free issues, twice daily, subscribers would pay $24 per year for monthly issues. In addition to supporting production costs, a percentage of that subscription revenue would go to the people who contribute to the publication. In order to ensure that the new model would be successful, The Printed Blog decided not to charge anything until it reached 3000 subscribers.

One method of driving subscriptions included bringing on well-known celebrity photographer Tyler Shields as a co-founder and photography editor. Shields' high-profile status, swarm of loyal fans, and friends in young Hollywood soon brought celebrity to the pages of The Printed Blog. In addition to supplying images for the content, Shields has also photographed actress Alessandra Torresani for the cover of The Printed Blog's "Love Issue." In addition, Torresani contributes a column to The Printed Blog on occasion.

This model also included bringing on Guest Editors to help structure content and select the posts which would be included. Notable Guest Editors who have participated in the construction of The Printed Blog include Robbie Woliver, a former reporter for The New York Times, Neal Boulton, former editor of Men's Fitness and owner of the blogs BastardLife and HeroinLife, Francesca Biller-Safran, winner of the Edward R. Murrow award, Ari Costa, filmmaker, and Stuart Goldman, former critic for The Los Angeles Times.

The most recent issue of The Printed Blog, "The Love Issue", included Guest Editors Brandon Mendelson, a humorist and author of the book Social Media is Bullshit, Laura Hunter-Thomas, a fashion blogger and competitive fencer currently training to participate in the 2012 Summer Olympics, Arushi Khosla, a fashion blogger from New Delhi, and Melysa Schmitt, a mommy blogger and former writer for NJ.com.

== Additional projects ==
=== International licenses ===
In early 2011, The Printed Blog licensed a franchise in St. Petersburg. Licensed to a group of young entrepreneurs, and for all of Russia, the international version of The Printed Blog created a commercial for promotion of their planned distribution of 50,000 with uniquely Russian content

There is also a Portuguese edition of The Printed Blog which has been licensed, and is planned for launch on Freedom Day.

=== Kumbuya ===
In May 2011, Joshua Karp and the team behind The Printed Blog launched a deal-making site called "Kumbuya" which allows users to generate their own discounts for the businesses and products they wished to promote.

In the initial press release announcing the launch, Karp said:

"When someone you know sends you a deal they created, for something they enjoy, you're much more likely to try it – social wins, every time. There's no better endorsement for your business than fans working on your behalf to sell your products and services. "

The actual "deal-making" process is quite simple. A user simply fills in the appropriate fields in the deal sentence: "I'd like to pay 'X' for a produce/service that normally costs 'X' at 'X' business and I'll get 'X' people to join me."

As the number of required buyers reaches the user-set minimum, "Kumbuya" contacts the business with the deal for approval. When the business agrees, the credit card the user provided when "purchasing" the deal is charged, and the user receives their deal coupon.
