= Juls Scherle =

American composer

- Born: Schwabach, Germany
- Genres: Film score; electronic
- Occupations: Film composer; conductor
- Instruments: Keyboards; piano
- Website: aboutjuls.com

Juls Scherle is a German-raised composer based in Los Angeles.

== Early life ==
Scherle grew up in a musical family. They (Note: Scherle uses they/them pronouns.) have been classically trained since age six. Their father is a lute and guitar builder. Their earliest memories are them hammering away at their family's home piano. The film The Fifth Element opened up their imagination to writing music for film.

== Career ==
Scherle started writing music for the TV series, Mr. Robot, and later furthered to other productions like American Horror Story and Scream Queens (2015).

They have also been credited for the drama series Pause and Princess of the Row, which The Independent Critic praised their score as "capturing all the right moments of grit and wonder, truth and love."

They have also worked in many films including Heart of Champions, Buried: The 1982 Alpine Meadows Avalanche, Missing (2023), and Luden.

== Awards ==
- SoCal Film Award: Best Score for Missing (2024)
- Los Angeles Film Award: Best Score for Buried: The 1982 Alpine Meadows Avalanche (2023)
- Oniros Film Award: Best Original Soundtrack for Buried: The 1982 Alpine Meadows Avalanche (2023)
- Hollywood Reel Independent Film Festival Award: Best Score for Princess of the Row (2022)
- Deep Focus Film Festival Award: Best Original Music for A Handful of Rust (2022)
- Oniros Film Award: Best Original Soundtrack for Princess of the Row (2022)
- Hollywood Art and Movie Award: Best Score for Heart of Champions (2022)
- London City Film Award: Best Soundtrack & Music Score for Heart of Champions (2022)
- Tokyo International Short Film Festival Award: Best Film Score for Heart of Champions (2022)
- Los Angeles Film Award: Best Score for Princess of the Row (2021)
- Roma Short Film Festival Award: Best Film Score for Heart of Champions (2021)
- New York Film Award: Best Music Video Mirrors (2018)
- Top Shorts Film Festival Award: Best Music Video Mirrors (2018)
- International Music Video Underground Award: Best Special Stuff Mirrors (2017)

== Filmography ==
=== Films ===
- Missing (2023)
- Buried: The 1982 Alpine Meadows Avalanche (2021)
- Heart of Champions (2021)
- Coming Clean (2020)
- Disrupted (2020)
- Purity Falls (2019)
- Hudson (2019)
- Princess of the Row (2019)
- Pause (2018)
- Alt Space (2018)
- Let's Be Evil (2016)

=== Television ===
- Luden (series) (2023)
- American Horror Story (series) (2016) additional music
- Mr. Robot (series) (2016) additional music
