= Final Girl (film) =

2015 American action thriller film

- Theatrical release poster
- Directed by: Tyler Shields
- Screenplay by: Adam Prince
- Story by: Stephen Scarlata; Alejandro Seri; Johnny Silver
- Produced by: Jack Nasser; Rob Carliner; Joseph Nasser
- Starring: Abigail Breslin; Alexander Ludwig; Wes Bentley; Cameron Bright; Francesca Eastwood
- Cinematography: Gregory Middleton
- Edited by: Trevor Mirosh
- Music by: Marc Canham
- Production companies: Final Girl Productions; NGN Productions; Prospect Park
- Distributed by: Cinedigm
- Release date: August 14, 2015 (United States)
- Running time: 84 minutes
- Country: United States
- Language: English

Final Girl is a 2015 American action horror thriller film directed by Tyler Shields in his directorial debut, written by Adam Prince, based on the story by Stephen Scarlata, Alejandro Seri, and Johnny Silver. It stars Abigail Breslin, Alexander Ludwig, and Wes Bentley. Breslin plays a young woman who is trained from childhood to defeat a group of high school boys who hunt and kill their female classmates. Cinedigm gave it a limited release in cinemas and through video on demand on August 14, 2015.

== Plot ==
Five-year-old Veronica meets with a man named William after her parents have died. He offers to take her in and train her for a job that is only for "special" people, explaining that his wife and child were killed by "a very bad man". She accepts.

Twelve years later, Veronica prepares to finish training. William injects her with a combination of truth serum and DMT, a hallucinatory drug, to confront her greatest fear, so she can understand what her victims will be experiencing. Despite believing herself fearless, Veronica confronts her greatest fear: failing her mission.

Four seventeen-year-old boys named Jameson, Daniel, Nelson, and Shane meet at a diner. Jameson chooses women for the group to hunt and kill; their latest prey is a girl named Gwen. The boys take her to the woods, where they murder her. Veronica meets Shane's girlfriend, Jennifer, on a recon mission, at the diner. They bond over their boy issues, revealing Veronica's romantic feelings for William despite their age difference and her awareness that he is emotionally unavailable. Jennifer tells her the boys are on the verge of falling apart. Next, using herself as bait, Veronica meets Jameson at the diner and accepts a date. The boys pick her up at the diner and take her to the woods, where they play truth or dare. Offering a whiskey flask to the boys from her purse, she tricks all except Jameson into drinking the hallucinogen. She draws the dare 'Die' and begs to go home. Jameson gives her five minutes to run, but the boys do not wait and go after her immediately.

As the drugs take effect, Daniel hallucinates two panda heads in suits coming after him; it is actually Veronica, who kills him with his own axe. Next, Veronica goes after Nelson, who sees a group of faceless thugs encircling him. His mother appears and they deeply kiss before he dies as Veronica crushes his head with a rock. Shane's worst fear is his girlfriend cheating on him with Jameson and discovering his true nature.

Jameson discovers Daniel's body and is intrigued. Shane's girlfriend arrives at their location in the woods. She sees Jameson and he tries to come on to her revealing they dated first. She rebuffs him but eventually gives in to his kisses. Shane appears at the car and sees Jameson and her kissing on a tree. Jameson reveals he slept with her already and the two begin to fight. They stop fighting and Jameson begins to tell her that they hunt and kill girls for fun. Jennifer does not believe him but Jameson pulls out a gun to kill her because they have revealed their secret. Shane stops him and they fight again. Shane wins and begins choking his girlfriend but then it shows that it was Veronica the entire time. She kills him. Jameson comes face to face with Veronica, and proposes a game of asking questions that the other must answer truthfully. Jameson says he has killed 21 women, counting her. When Veronica reveals she enjoyed killing his friends, he proposes they work together, but she declines. They fight until he passes out from a choke-hold that William taught Veronica earlier. She forces him to drink the drugged alcohol and, when he awakens, finds himself standing on a tree stump with a noose around his neck. He swears that he will never kill again but Veronica does not believe him. As the drugs take effect, his victims, including Gwen, come out of the trees and move toward him. In his terror, Jameson steps off the tree stump and hangs himself. William appears and congratulates Veronica, and they go to the diner to eat pancakes.

== Cast ==
- Abigail Breslin as Veronica
  - Gracyn Shinyei as Young Veronica
- Alexander Ludwig as Jameson, The Mastermind
- Wes Bentley as William
- Cameron Bright as Shane
- Reece Thompson as Nelson
- Francesca Eastwood as Gwen Thomas
- Logan Huffman as Daniel
- Emma Paetz as Jennifer
- Desiree Zurowski as Nelson's mother

== Production ==
=== Development ===
On November 29, 2011, Variety announced that photographer Tyler Shields would make his directorial debut with Final Girl, which will be produced by Prospect Park.

=== Casting ===
On May 21, 2012, Abigail Breslin joined the cast of the film as a lead actress. Later, in October 2012, Alexander Ludwig also joined the cast. That same month, Wes Bentley joined in an unspecified role. Other actors that later joined the cast include Logan Huffman, Cameron Bright, and Francesca Eastwood.

=== Filming ===
Filming began in November 2012 in Vancouver, British Columbia, Canada.

== Release ==
The film was released in the United States on August 14, 2015, in a limited release and through video on demand. The film was released in the United Kingdom through video on demand on August 31, 2015.

== Reception ==
=== Critical response ===
On the review aggregator website Rotten Tomatoes, 25% of 12 critics' reviews are positive.

Justin Chang of Variety called Final Girl "a mildly intriguing thriller of comeuppance that leaves you wanting more" and wrote "With its seemingly deliberate absence of context or character development, this patchy, underwritten thriller could almost pass for a critique of any number of genre forebears in which the mere presence of a hot, ass-kicking female avenger is meant to seem subversive." Joe Neumaier of the Daily News gave the film 0 out of 5 stars, and stated that it "has long stretches of awkward dialogue that resemble acting-class exercises, and contains so many mist-shrouded forests Merlin would feel at home." Neumaier concluded his review by saying "Breslin, whose recent resume hasn't lived up to her Oscar nomination for Little Miss Sunshine, needs to find something worthy of her talents. An Oscar nominee shouldn't even watch Final Girl, much less star in it." Chuck Bowen of Slant Magazine rated it 2.5 out of 4 stars, and commented "The film is in on its own absurdity, starting with the title." Bowen also wrote "The filmmakers never really answer inevitable questions: What's the point of these fussy allusions?" and "The creators of Final Girl are ambitious, equal-opportunity fetishists, who throw things against a figurative wall to see what sticks. And more of it sticks than you might reasonably expect, primarily due to Breslin, who gives an astutely playful performance."
