= Jacob Vargas =

Mexican actor

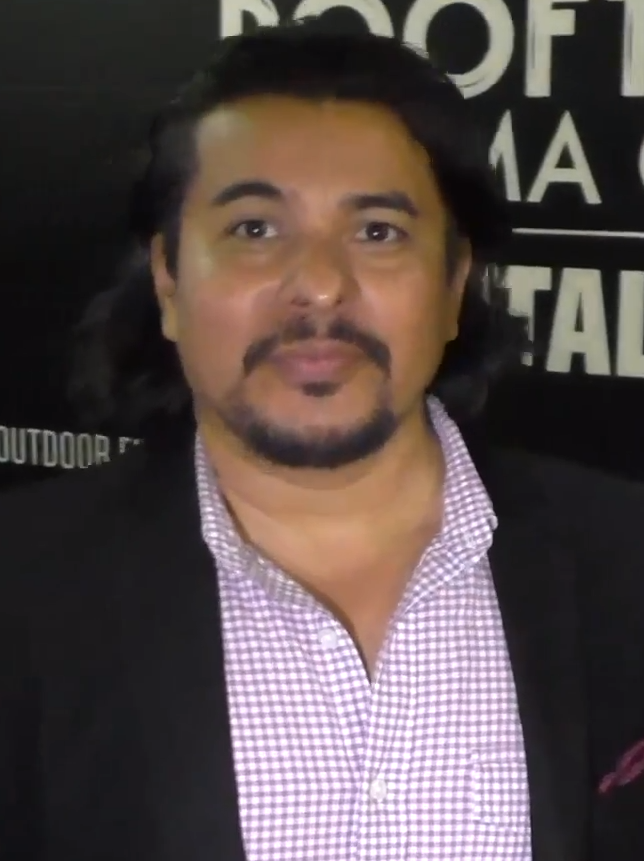
- Vargas in 2016
- Born: Michoacán, Mexico
- Occupations: Actor; producer; dancer
- Years active: 1985–present
- Spouse: Sylvia Arzate
- Children: 2

Jacob Vargas is a Mexican-American actor, producer, and dancer.

== Early life ==
Vargas was born in Michoacán, Mexico, and raised in Pacoima, Los Angeles. He was raised in a devout Roman Catholic family. He attended high school at San Fernando High School in San Fernando, California, and also Van Nuys Performing Arts High School.

== Career ==
Vargas has been a working actor for over forty years.

In 1992, Vargas appeared in American Me. In 1995, Vargas won the very first ALMA Award (for Emerging Artist of the Year) for his work in both Allison Anders' Mi Vida Loca, and Gregory Nava's My Family. In 1995, Vargas would appear in Get Shorty. In 1997, Vargas appeared in Romy and Michele's High School Reunion. In 1999, Vargas became the voice of Max Steel.

In 2000, Vargas played Benicio del Toro's partner Manolo in director Steven Soderbergh's drug trafficking film Traffic, which earned him a Screen Actors Guild Award and another ALMA Award. The same year he also played the Joker from the Joker Brothers in the Next Friday. He played A.B. Quintanilla, the brother of the late Tejano singer Selena in the biopic film of the same name. In 2002, Vargas played Caesar Chavez in FX Network's film RFK. In 2004, Vargas played Sammy the chef in John Moore's Flight of the Phoenix.

In 2005, Vargas co-starred with Paul Walker and Laurence Fishburne in The Death and Life of Bobby Z. and also played Marine sniper Cortez in Sam Mendes' war drama Jarhead. In 2006, Vargas played a politically charged busboy in Emilio Estevez's historical drama Bobby. In 2010, Vargas played Ramirez, a building security officer, in Devil. 2011, Vargas played the father of Water Enrique Murciano and Power Nicholas Gonzalez in this true story.

From 2013 to 2014, Vargas played Montez on two seasons of Sons of Anarchy and six episodes of Mayans M.C.

In 2014, Vargas played Richard Chavez opposite Michael Peña in the biopic Cesar Chavez directed by Diego Luna.

In 2015, Vargas played Edison "Elvis" Peña in the film The 33, It is the true story of the 33 Chilean miners that were trapped for 69 days.

In 2016, Vargas reoccurred as Domingo Colon in the Netflix series Luke Cage. In 2016, Vargas also reoccurred in Colony, Amazon Studio's Hand of God and he co-stars in Hulu's Crushed. In 2019, Vargas co-starred in Max Carlson's Princess of the Row opposite Martin Sheen and Ana Ortiz. He also co-starred in Peel.

From 2019 to 2020, Vargas was a regular on the Netflix series Mr. Iglesias.

In 2020, Jacob Vargas and Justina Machado were Masters of Ceremonies at the National Hispanic Media Coalition Impact Awards.

== Personal life ==
He is married to Sylvia Arzate. They have two daughters.

== Filmography ==
=== Film ===
Year	Title	Role	Notes
1986	The Children of Times Square	Alberto	TV movie
1986	Miracle of the Heart: A Boys Town Story	Enrique Mendoza	TV movie
1986	Last Resort	Carlos	
1987	Ernest Goes to Camp	Butch "Too Cool" Vargas	
1987	The Principal	Arturo Diego	
1988	Little Nikita	Miguel	
1989	Crack House	Danny	
1990	The Big One: The Great Los Angeles Earthquake	Miguel	TV movie
1991	Never Forget	Student	TV movie
1991	Seeds of Tragedy	Cholo #2	TV movie
1992	Gas Food Lodging	Javier	
1992	American Me	Paulito Santana - Age 15	
1992	Steel Justice	Arturo Gomez	TV movie
1992	Judgment	Hispanic Boy	
1993	Mi Vida Loca	Ernesto "Bullet"	
1993	Airborne	"Snake"	
1993	Silent Rain	Dave Alvers	Short
1993	Fatal Instinct	Flower Delivery Man	
1994	Huck and the King of Hearts	Pedro	
1995	My Family	Young Jose Sánchez	
1995	Crimson Tide	Sonarman #2	
1995	Hotel Oasis	Young Book Salesman	Short
1995	Get Shorty	Yayo Portillo	
1997	Selena	A.B. Quintanilla	
1997	Romy and Michele's High School Reunion	Ramón	
1997	Santa Fe	Jesus	
1998	The Hi-Lo Country	Delfino Mondragon	
2000	Next Friday	"Joker"	
2000	Traffic	Manolo Sanchez	
2001	Come and Take It Day	Miguel	
2001	Dr. Dolittle 2	Pepito (voice)	
2001	She-Bat	Zer	Short
2002	Road Dogz	Danny Pacheco	
2002	Final Breakdown	Gonzalez	
2002	Dragonfly	Victor	
2002	RFK	Cesar Chavez	TV movie
2004	Memoirs of an Evil Stepmother	Vincent Enano	Short
2004	Flight of the Phoenix	Sammi	
2005	The Wendell Baker Story	Reyes Morales	
2005	Jarhead	Private First Class Juan Cortez	
2006	The Virgin of Juarez	Detective Lauro	
2006	Bobby	Miguel	
2006	National Lampoon's TV: The Movie	Tijuana Cop #2	
2007	The Hills Have Eyes 2	Private First Class Carlos "Crank" Medina	
2007	Are We Done Yet?	Mike, The Plumber	
2007	The Death and Life of Bobby Z	Jorge Escobar	
2008	Love Lies Bleeding	Detective Billy Jones	Video
2008	Sleep Dealer	Rudy Ramirez	
2008	Death Race	Gunner	
2009	Tom Cool	-	
2010	Devil	Ramirez	
2011	Reunion	Male Lead	Short
2011	Machine Gun Justice	J.J. Magnum	Short
2012	Filmmaker Intervention	-	Short
2012	Gotten	Pimp	Short
2012	El cocodrilo	Eduardo	Short
2013	Go for Sisters	Navajas	
2013	Water & Power	Asuncion Garcia	
2014	The Tell-Tale Heart	Adams	
2014	Cesar Chavez	Richard Chavez	
2014	Red Sky	Jorge "P-Dawg" Vasquez	
2014	The Valley in the Struggle	The Narrator	Video
2014	Heaven Is for Real	Michael	
2015	The 33	Edison Peña	
2015	In Between the Gutter and the Stars	Daniel	Short
2016	Crossing Point	Jesus	
2016	Middle School: The Worst Years of My Life	Animation Voices (voice)	
2016	King of LA	Ignacio	Short
2017	Beyond Skyline	Officer Garcia	
2018	The Public	Ernesto	
2018	Endgame	Alberto	Short
2019	Peel	Chuck	
2019	Princess of the Row	Donald	
2021	Plan B	Pastor Pedro	
2022	KIMI	Glasses Thug	
2022	Satanic Hispanics	El Jefe	

=== Television ===
Year	Title	Role	Notes
1986	Hunter	Emilio Morales	Episode: "Fagin 1986"
1986	Disneyland	Student #2	Episode: "The B.R.A.T. Patrol"
1987	The New Gidget	Enrique	Episode: "Oddballs"
1987	The Tracey Ullman Show	Taco Place Manager	Episode: "Episode #2.3"
1989	Hard Time on Planet Earth	Billy	Episode: "The Hot Dog Man"
1991	The New Adam-12	Collins	Episode: "D.A.R.E."
1991	Nurses	Luis	Episode: "Begone with the Wind"
1992	Full House	Enrique	Episode: "Educating Jesse"
1995	Happily Ever After: Fairy Tales for Every Child	Prince Luis (voice)	Episode: "Sleeping Beauty"
1995	JAG	Corporal Cortez	Episode: "War Cries"
1995	ER	"Diablo"	Episode: "A Miracle Happens Here"
1996	Malibu Shores	Benny	Main Cast
1996	The Pretender	Javi Padillo	Episode: "Every Picture Tells a Story"
1997	Clueless	Ricardo	Episode: "Salsa, Chlorine & Tears"
2000–01	Max Steel	Dr. Roberto Martinez (voice)	Recurring Cast
2001	Six Feet Under	Manuel "Paco" Bolin	Episode: "Familia"
2002	The Brothers García	"Chuey"	Episode: "West Side Stories"
2002	Watching Ellie	Miguel	Episode: "Gift"
2002	The Proud Family	Big Alto (voice)	Episode: "The Altos"
2002–03	Greetings from Tucson	Ernesto Tiant	Main Cast
2003	Kingpin	Ernesto "El Huevudo" Romo	Episode: "Pilot"
2004	CSI: NY	Luis Torres	Episode: "Outside Man"
2006	Numbers	Victor Borrego	Episode: "Mind Games"
2007–08	Moonlight	Guillermo Gasol	Recurring Cast
2009	Cold Case	Angelo Rivera	Episode: "Dead Heat"
2010	Burn Notice	Omar Hernandez	Episode: "Friendly Fire"
2010	The Good Guys	Tico	Episode: "Little Things"
2010	Psych	Juan Lava	Episode: "The Polarizing Express"
2011	Medium	Eduardo Garcia	Episode: "Me Without You"
2011	CSI: Miami	Felix Medina	Episode: "Last Stand"
2012	Christine	Roy	Episode: "Roy"
2013	Kroll Show	Himself	Episode: "Soaked in Success"
2013	The Mentalist	Chief Rick Anaya	Episode: "The Red Barn"
2013–14	Blue	Roy	Recurring Cast: Season 2, Guest: Season 3
2013–14	Sons of Anarchy	Allesandro "Domingo" Montez	Recurring Cast: Season 6-7
2015	Complications	Ramon	Episode: "Infection"
2015–2017	Hand of God	Julio Farkas	Recurring Cast: Season 1, Guest: Season 2
2016	Colony	Carlos	Recurring Cast: Season 1
2016	Luke Cage	Domingo Colon	Recurring Cast: Season 1
2017	Philip K. Dick's Electric Dreams	Mario	Episode: "Real Life"
2017	Tarantula	Paja (voice)	Main Cast
2018	Mosaic	Horacio	Main Cast
2019	Young Justice: Outsiders	Cisco Ramon (voice)	Episode: "Exceptional Human Beings"
2019–20	Mr. Iglesias	Tony Ochoa	Main Cast
2020	Solar Opposites	(voice)	Episode: "The Quantum Ring"
2020	Game On: A Comedy Crossover Event	Tony Ochoa	Episode: "Mr. Iglesias: Olympic Effort"
2019–21	Mayans M.C.	Allesandro "Domingo" Montez	Recurring Cast: Season 2–3
2022	Surfside Girls	Bob	Recurring Cast
2023	National Treasure: Edge of History	Rafael	Recurring Cast
2023	Lopez vs Lopez	Javier	Episode: "Lopez vs Primos"

=== Audio books ===
Year	Title	Role
2015	Rain of the Ghosts	Sebastian Bohique
