= Abigail Breslin =

American actress (born 1996)

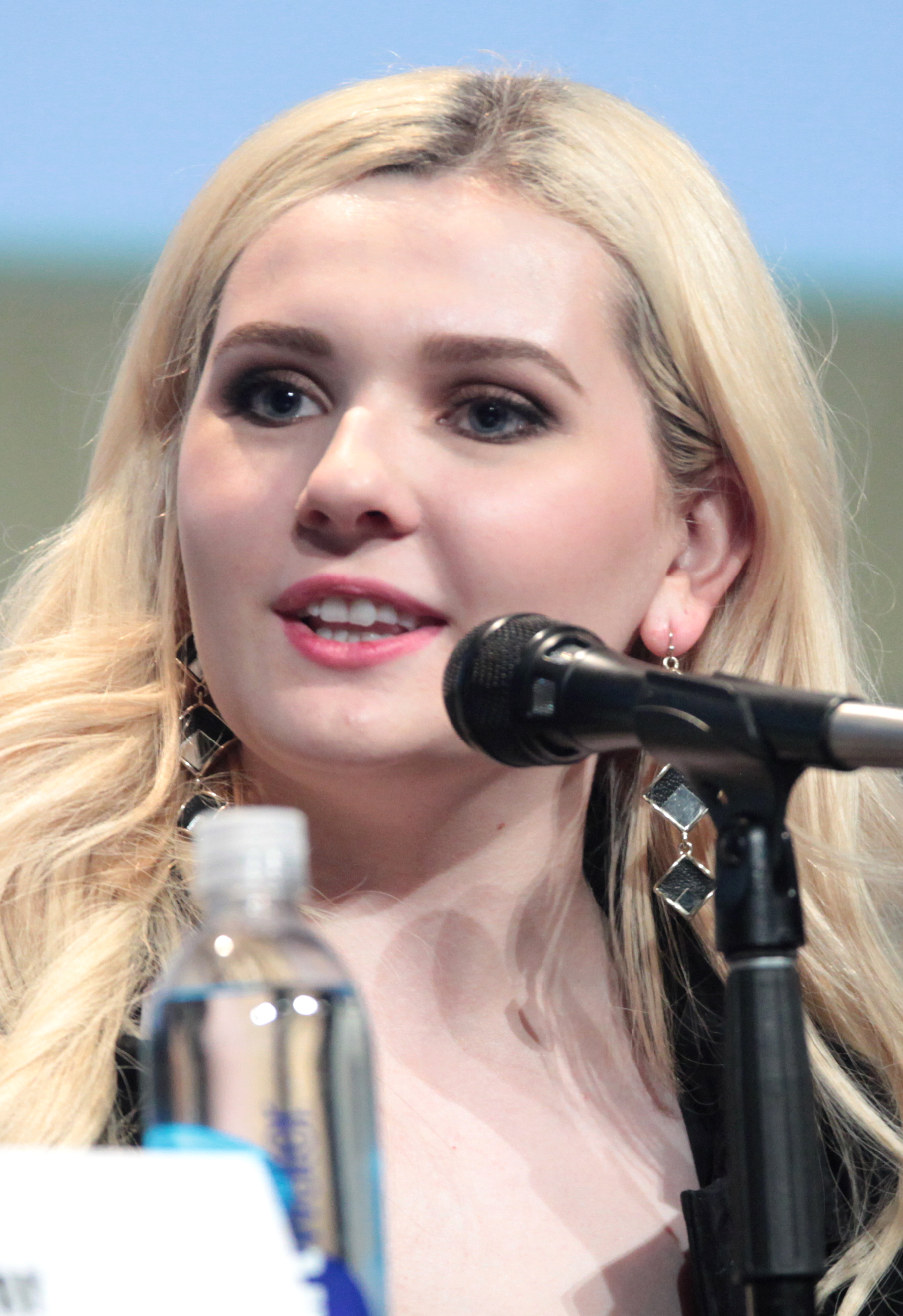
- Breslin in 2015
- Born: April 14, 1996 (age 30); New York City, U.S.
- Occupation: Actress
- Years active: 1999–present
- Spouse: Ira Kunyansky (m. 2023)
- Relatives: Spencer Breslin (brother)

Abigail Breslin (born April 14, 1996) is an American actress. Following a string of film parts as a young child, she rose to prominence at age 10 after playing Olive Hoover in Little Miss Sunshine (2006), for which Breslin received a nomination for the Academy Award for Best Supporting Actress. She went on to establish herself as a mainstream actress with roles in films such as No Reservations (2007), Nim's Island (2008), Definitely, Maybe (2008), My Sister's Keeper, Zombieland (both 2009), Rango (2011), The Call, August: Osage County, Ender's Game (all 2013), Maggie (2015), Zombieland: Double Tap (2019) and Stillwater (2021). Breslin's other projects include the Fox series Scream Queens (2015–2016), where she portrayed Libby Putney, her first regular role on television.

== Early life ==
Breslin is the daughter of Michael Breslin, a telecommunications expert, computer programmer, and consultant. The Breslin siblings were raised in the Lower East Side neighborhood of the Manhattan borough in New York City in a "very close-knit" household. Her mother is of Irish ancestry, while her father was of mixed Jewish and Irish descent.

Breslin is named after Abigail Adams, the first Second Lady of the United States and second First Lady of the United States.

== Career ==
=== Early roles ===
Breslin's career began at age three when she appeared in a Toys "R" Us commercial. Breslin's first acting role was in Signs (2002), directed by M. Night Shyamalan, where she played Bo Hess, the daughter of the main character, Graham Hess (Mel Gibson). Signs garnered mostly positive reviews and was a box office success, grossing $408 million worldwide. Breslin's performance in the film was praised by critics. David Ansen of Newsweek wrote that she and co-star Rory Culkin gave "terrifically natural, nuanced performances". In 2004, she appeared in Raising Helen, in which she and her brother Spencer played siblings, but the film fared poorly. That same year, Breslin appeared in Chestnut: Hero of Central Park.

Breslin had a small role as an orphan named Carolina in The Princess Diaries 2: Royal Engagement. In the independent film Keane, she played Kira Bedik, a young girl who reminds the mentally disturbed protagonist William Keane (Damian Lewis) of his missing, abducted daughter. Keane had a limited theatrical release and grossed only $394,390 worldwide but it received positive reviews and Breslin's performance was praised by critics. Meghan Keane of The New York Sun wrote that "the scenes between Mr. Lewis and the charmingly fragile Kira, winningly played by Ms. Breslin, bring a captivating humanity to the film".

=== 2000s ===
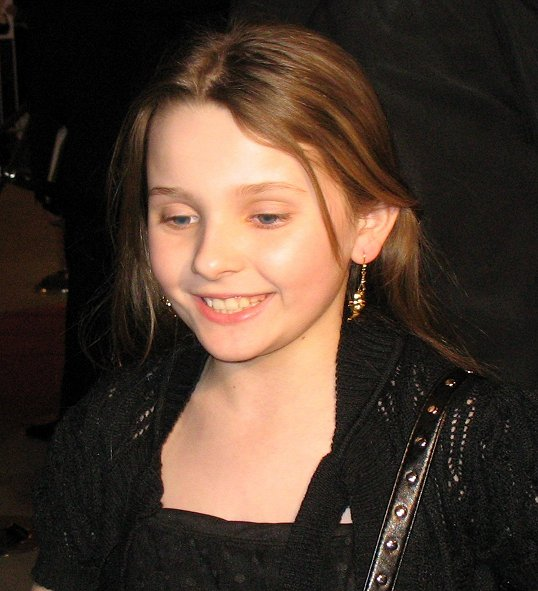
Breslin in January 2007

Breslin's breakthrough role was in the 2006 comedy-drama Little Miss Sunshine, where she played Olive Hoover, a beauty pageant contestant, the youngest in a dysfunctional family on a road trip. She was cast at the age of six, years before filming was started. Her co-stars, Greg Kinnear and Alan Arkin, both stated that they were "astounded by her seriousness of purpose during shooting." Little Miss Sunshine was a critical and commercial success, grossing $100 million worldwide. Her performance was highly praised; Claudia Puig of USA Today wrote that, "If Olive had been played by any other little girl, she would not have affected us as mightily as [she] did." She received nominations for the Screen Actors Guild Award and Academy Award for Best Supporting Actress, becoming the fourth youngest actress to be nominated in that category. Although Jennifer Hudson won the Oscar, Breslin co-presented with actor Jaden Smith at the 79th Academy Awards on February 25, 2007. Breslin was part of the Disney Year of a Million Dreams celebration. Annie Leibovitz photographed her as Fira from Disney Fairies with Dame Julie Andrews as the Blue Fairy from Pinocchio.

On October 27, 2007, Breslin made her stage debut in the play Right You Are (If You Think You Are) in New York City at the Guggenheim Museum starring in an ensemble cast, including Cate Blanchett, Dianne Wiest, Natalie Portman and Peter Sarsgaard. In 2007, Breslin was ranked No. 8 in Forbes magazine's list of "Young Hollywood's Top-Earning Stars", having earned $1.5 million in 2006. Breslin next appeared in the 2007 romantic comedy No Reservations, playing the niece of master chef Kate Armstrong (Catherine Zeta-Jones). The film garnered mostly negative reviews but was successful at the box office, grossing $92 million worldwide. Roger Ebert wrote that Breslin "has the stuff to emerge as a three-dimensional kid, if she weren't employed so resolutely as a pawn." In 2007, she also starred in Definitely, Maybe, as the daughter of a recently divorced father (played by Ryan Reynolds); the film garnered generally favorable reviews, with Steven Rea of The Philadelphia Inquirer writing that Breslin is "alarmingly cute – but she backs the cuteness up with serious acting instinct."

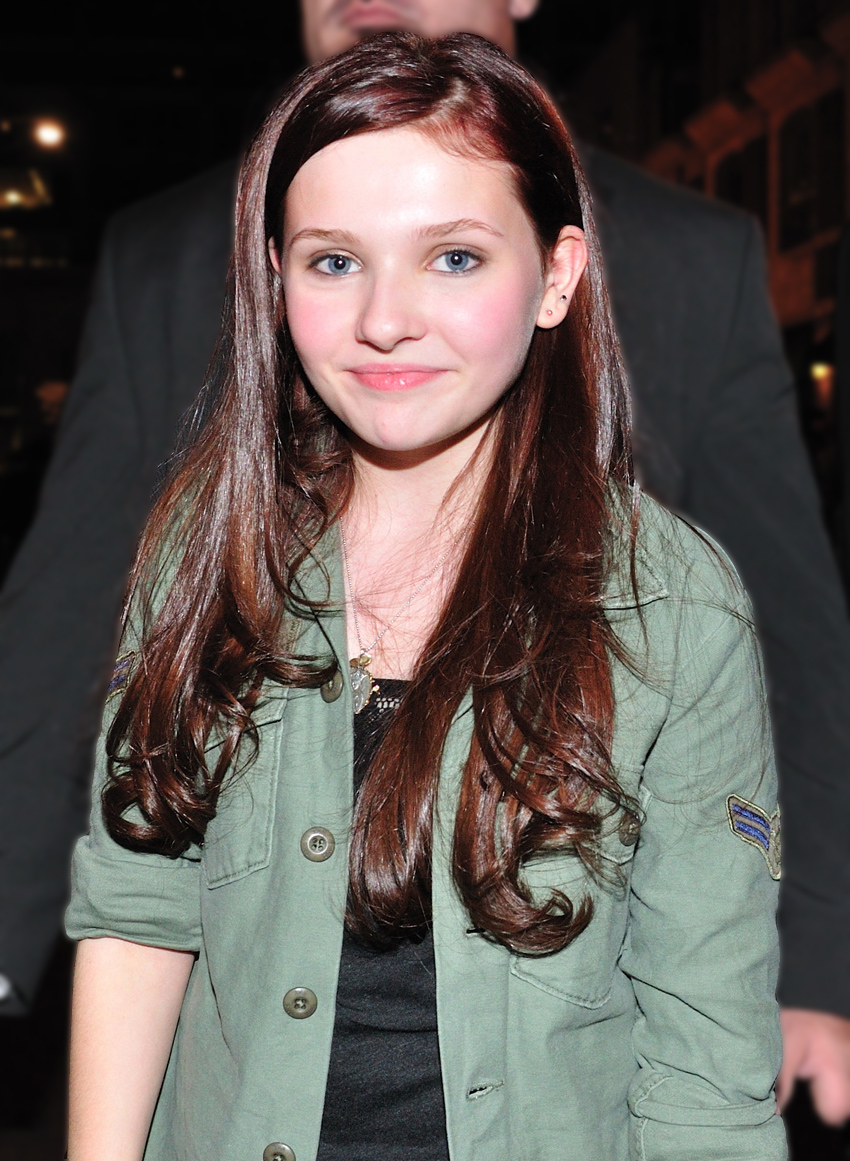
Breslin at the 2010 Toronto International Film Festival

In 2008, Breslin starred with Jodie Foster in the film Nim's Island as Nim Rusoe, a young girl who lives on a remote tropical island. Nim's Island received mixed reviews but was successful financially, grossing $100 million worldwide. In 2008, she played the titular role in Kit Kittredge: An American Girl. The film was based on the American Girl line of dolls, books, and accessories, of which Breslin was a fan. Kit Kittredge: An American Girl garnered favorable reviews and grossed $17 million at the box office. Breslin's performance in the film was praised by critics; Joe Morgenstern of The Wall Street Journal wrote that she "carries the event-stuffed story with unflagging grace."

In 2009, Breslin appeared in My Sister's Keeper, where she played the role of Anna Fitzgerald, a young girl who was conceived to be a donor for her sister, Kate, who suffers from leukemia. Sisters Elle and Dakota Fanning were slated to play the roles of Anna and Kate respectively; however, Dakota refused to shave her head for the role, so she and Elle were replaced by Sofia Vassilieva and Breslin. My Sister's Keeper received mixed reviews but was a financial success, grossing $95 million worldwide. James Berardinelli wrote that Breslin and Vassilieva "display a natural bond one might expect from sisters, and there's no hint of artifice or overacting in either performance." Also in 2009, Breslin appeared in the horror comedy Zombieland as Little Rock. Director Ruben Fleischer said that "the dream was always to get Abigail Breslin" for the role. The film received positive reviews and was successful at the box office, grossing $102 million worldwide.

=== 2010s ===
With previews beginning in February 2010, she made her Broadway debut as Helen Keller in The Miracle Worker at the Circle in the Square Theatre. Breslin has said that she was honored to play Keller, who is one of her "biggest heroes". The Alliance for Inclusion in the Arts, an advocacy group for blind and deaf actors, criticized the play's producers for not casting a deaf or blind actor in the role. Lead producer David Richenthal defended the decision, saying that he needed a well-known actress: "It's simply naïve to think that in this day and age, you'll be able to sell tickets to a play revival solely on the potential of the production to be a great show or on the potential for an unknown actress to give a breakthrough performance." Vision-impaired actress Kyra Siegel was cast as Breslin's understudy. Breslin's performance was praised by critics; Frank Scheck of The Hollywood Reporter wrote that she "well portrays Helen's feral rebelliousness in the play's early sections and is deeply touching as her character's bond with her teacher grows." Ticket sales for the play, however, were considered disappointing, and the show closed in April 2010. In September 2009, Breslin filmed in Des Moines, Iowa, playing the title role in the film Janie Jones: a 13-year-old girl who is abandoned by her former-groupie mother (Elisabeth Shue), and informs Ethan Brand (Alessandro Nivola), a fading rock star, that she is his daughter. The film premiered at the 2010 Toronto International Film Festival.

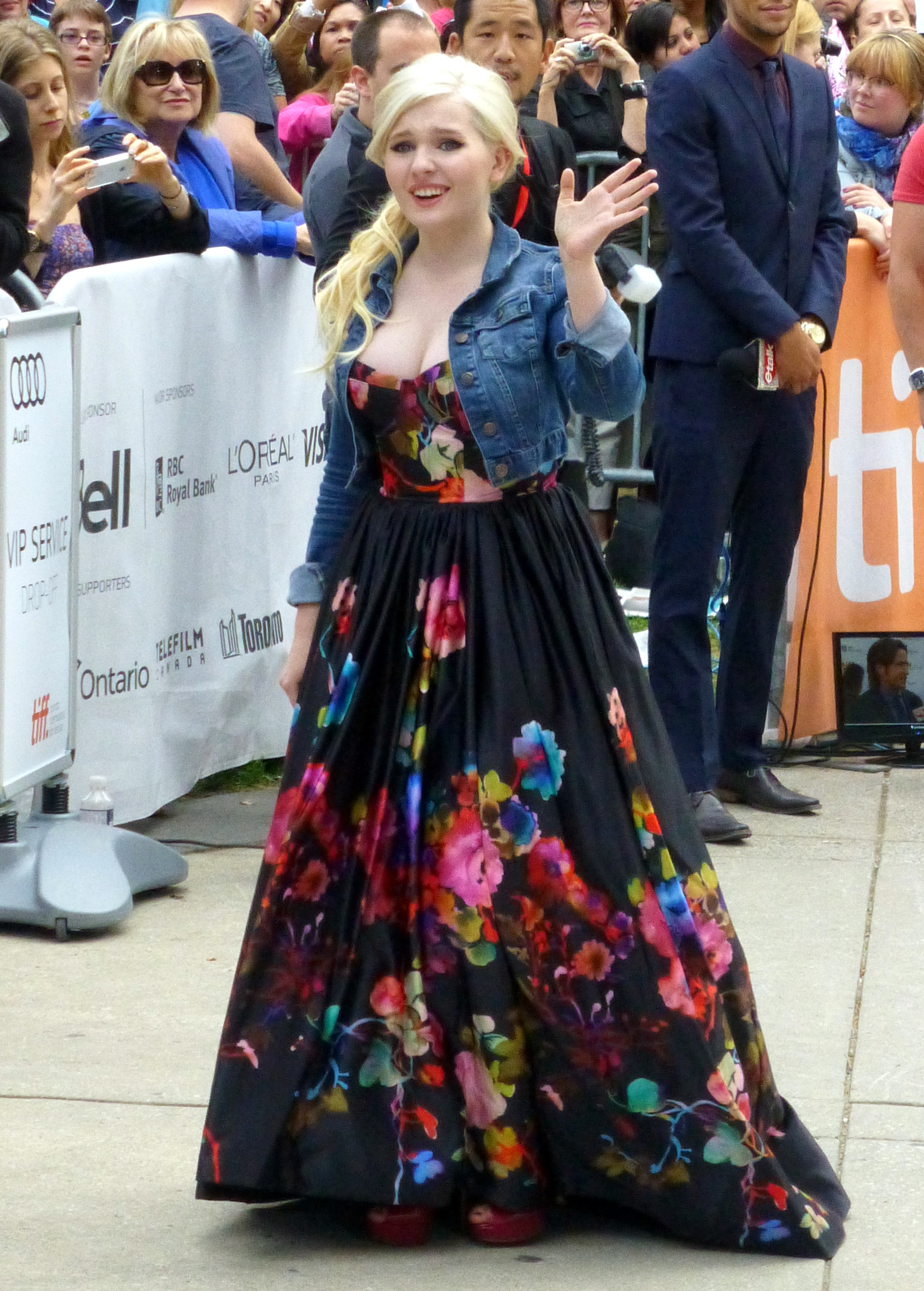
Breslin at the premiere of August: Osage County in 2013

In 2011, Breslin voiced Priscilla, a cactus mouse in the film Rango, an animated throw-back to Spaghetti westerns, directed by Gore Verbinski. That same year, she also appeared in the romantic comedy New Year's Eve. In 2013, she appeared in the thriller The Call. The film received mixed reviews from critics. Andrew Barker of Variety wrote that Breslin "acquits herself well enough for a problematic role in which she's forced to cry and scream nearly continuously." The Call grossed $68 million worldwide. In 2013, Breslin also appeared in Haunter in the role of Lisa, a ghost who bonds with a future girl living in her house to stop an evil killing spirit with the help of his many victims.

In July 2012, she was cast in August: Osage County, the film adaptation of the Pulitzer Prize-winning play of the same name, alongside Julia Roberts, Benedict Cumberbatch, and Meryl Streep. August: Osage County was released in December 2013, and received mostly positive reviews. Breslin also starred in the film adaptation of Orson Scott Card's novel, Ender's Game The film received mixed reviews from critics but it was a disappointment at the box office, grossing only $125 million worldwide from a $110 million budget. In 2014, Breslin appeared in the crime drama Perfect Sisters. In January 2015, she was cast in Fox's horror-comedy series Scream Queens, as the wealthy, awkward sidekick to Emma Roberts' character, Libby Putney, who is referred to as Chanel #5 for the majority of the series. The series aired from September 2015 to December 2016.

In 2019, Breslin reprised her role as Little Rock in the horror comedy sequel film Zombieland: Double Tap.

=== 2020s ===
In 2021, Breslin starred opposite Matt Damon in the crime drama film Stillwater from DreamWorks and Participant, directed by Tom McCarthy.

In 2026, Breslin was cast as Cahlin in the fourth and final season of the Netflix series The Night Agent.

== Personal life ==
In April 2017, Breslin stated that an ex-boyfriend had raped her, and she had since been diagnosed with PTSD. Breslin explained that she did not report being raped at the time because she "was in complete shock and total denial", "feared not being believed" by the police, worried about revenge by the assailant if he found out and concerned about him hurting her family. Breslin continues to advocate against sexual assault.

Her father, Michael, died at age 78 on February 26, 2021, of complications related to COVID-19.

In February 2022, Breslin revealed on Instagram that she was engaged to her longtime boyfriend Ira Kunyansky. They married on January 28, 2023.

== Filmography ==
=== Film ===
Key
| † | Denotes films that have not yet been released |

| Year | Title | Role | Notes |
|---|---|---|---|
| 2002 | Signs | Bo Hess | |
| 2004 | Raising Helen | Sarah Davis | |
| 2004 | The Princess Diaries 2: Royal Engagement | Carolina | |
| 2004 | Keane | Kira Bedik | |
| 2004 | Chestnut: Hero of Central Park | Ray | |
| 2006 | Air Buddies | Rosebud | Voice |
| 2006 | Little Miss Sunshine | Olive Hoover | |
| 2006 | The Ultimate Gift | Emily Rose | |
| 2006 | The Santa Clause 3: The Escape Clause | Trish | |
| 2007 | No Reservations | Zoe Armstrong | |
| 2008 | Definitely, Maybe | Maya Hayes | |
| 2008 | Nim's Island | Nim Rusoe | |
| 2008 | Kit Kittredge: An American Girl | Kit Kittredge | |
| 2009 | My Sister's Keeper | Anna Fitzgerald | |
| 2009 | Zombieland | Little Rock | |
| 2010 | Quantum Quest: A Cassini Space Odyssey | Jeana | Voice |
| 2010 | Janie Jones | Janie Jones | |
| 2011 | Rango | Priscilla | Voice |
| 2011 | New Year's Eve | Hailey Doyle | |
| 2012 | Zambezia | Zoe | Voice |
| 2013 | Haunter | Lisa Johnson | |
| 2013 | The Call | Casey Welson | |
| 2013 | The Screen Test | Woman | Short film |
| 2013 | August: Osage County | Jean Fordham | |
| 2013 | Ender's Game | Valentine Wiggin | |
| 2014 | Wicked Blood | Hannah Lee | Direct-to-video |
| 2014 | Perfect Sisters | Sandra Andersen | |
| 2015 | Maggie | Maggie Vogel | |
| 2015 | Final Girl | Veronica | |
| 2016 | Fear, Inc. | Jennifer | |
| 2017 | Freak Show | Lynette | |
| 2017 | Yamasong: March of the Hollows | Nani | Voice |
| 2019 | Zombieland: Double Tap | Little Rock | |
| 2021 | Stillwater | Allison Baker | |
| 2022 | Canyon Del Muerto | Anne Morrow Lindbergh | |
| 2022 | The Cannibals | Salem Magnotti | Short film; also writer, director, producer |
| 2022 | Living with Chucky | Self | Documentary |
| 2022 | Slayers | Jules Ray | Also producer |
| 2023 | Miranda's Victim | Trish Weir | |
| 2023 | Magda | Magda | Short film; also executive producer |
| 2024 | Classified | Kacey Walker | |
| 2025 | The Italians | Lily | |
| 2025 | Chapter 51 | Ava Bergman | |
| TBA | As Deep as the Grave † | Anne Morrow Lindbergh | Post-production |

=== Television ===
Key
| † | Denotes television productions that have not yet been released |

| Year | Title | Role | Notes |
|---|---|---|---|
| 2002 | What I Like About You | Josie | Episode: "The Teddy Bear" |
| 2002 | Hack | Kayla Adams | Episode: "Domestic Disturbance" |
| 2004 | Law & Order: Special Victims Unit | Patty Branson | Episode: "Birthright" |
| 2004 | NCIS | Sandy Watson | Episode: "See No Evil" |
| 2005 | Family Plan | Nicole | Television film |
| 2006 | Ghost Whisperer | Sarah Applewhite | Episode: "Melinda's First Ghost" |
| 2006 | Grey's Anatomy | Megan Clover | Episode: "Sometimes a Fantasy" |
| 2013 | Project Runway All Stars | Herself (guest judge) | Episode: "Marge Madness" |
| 2015–2016 | Scream Queens | Libby Putney / Chanel #5 | Main role |
| 2017 | Dirty Dancing | Frances "Baby" Houseman | Television film |
| 2022 | The Cannibals | Salem Magnotti | Also writer, director, producer |
| 2023 | Accused | Esme | Episode: "Esme's Story" |
| 2026 | I Killed Him in My Sleep | Kelty | Lifetime Television Movie |
| TBA | The Night Agent † | Cahlin | Main role (season 4) |

=== Video games ===
| Year | Title | Voice role |
|---|---|---|
| 2019 | Zombieland: Double Tap – Road Trip | Little Rock |
| 2021 | Zombieland VR: Headshot Fever | Little Rock |

=== Audio dramas ===
| Year | Title | Role | Notes |
|---|---|---|---|
| 2022 | Daniel X: Genesis | Maizy | 4 episodes |
| 2023 | Supreme: The Battle for Roe | Linda Coffee | 5 episodes |

== Discography ==
=== Soundtrack albums ===
| Title | Details |
|---|---|
| Janie Jones | Released October 11, 2011; Format: Digital download, CD, streaming; Label: Nettwerk Productions / Janie Jones, Llc |

=== Extended plays ===
| Title | Details |
|---|---|
| Witchcraft | Released: February 14, 2022; Format: Digital download, streaming; Label: TBA |

=== Singles ===
| Title | Year | Album |
|---|---|---|
| "Fight for Me" | 2011 | Janie Jones |
| "Christmas in New York" | 2013 | Non-album singles |
| "You Suck" | 2014 | Non-album singles |
| "Sleepwalking" | 2018 | Non-album singles |
| "90s Honey" | 2019 | Non-album singles |
| "Steve McQueen" | 2021 | Non-album singles |
| "W I T C H C R A F T" | 2021 | Witchcraft |
| "HEX" | 2021 | Witchcraft |
| "Babydoll" | 2022 | Non-album singles |
| "Woman's Intuition" (with Lily Lane) | 2023 | Non-album singles |
| "Last Christmas" | 2023 | Non-album singles |
| "LOVE ON LOAN" | 2024 | Non-album singles |

=== As featuring artist ===
| Song | Year | Album |
|---|---|---|
| "Well Wishes" (Cabb featuring Abigail Breslin & Cassidy Reiff) | 2011 | Non-album singles |
| "New Year's Eve" (Cabb featuring Abigail Breslin & Cassidy Reiff) | 2011 | Non-album singles |
| "Within Me A Lunatic Sings" | 2012 | Stargroves |
| "Westfjords" | 2014 | Stargroves |
| "Telephone" (Stargroves featuring Abigail Breslin) | 2017 | Non-album Singles |
| "We Are Legend" (Dimitri Vegas & Like Mike vs Steve Aoki featuring Abigail Breslin) | 2017 | Non-album Singles |

=== Other appearances ===
| Title | Year | Other artist(s) | Album |
|---|---|---|---|
| "Hurricane" | 2011 | None | Janie Jones |
| "Find Love" | 2011 | Alessandro Nivola | Janie Jones |
| "Just A Game" | 2011 | None | Janie Jones |
| "House of the Rising Sun" | 2011 | None | Janie Jones |
| "The Worst Part / Auld Lang Syne" | 2014 | Cassidy Reiff | Perfect Sisters |

== Accolades ==
| Year | Award | Category | Work | Result |
|---|---|---|---|---|
| 2003 | Phoenix Film Critics Society | Best Performance by a Youth - Female | Signs | Nominated |
| 2003 | Young Artist Award | Best Young Actress in a Feature Film - Ten or Under | Signs | Nominated |
| 2006 | Alliance of Women Film Journalists | Best Breakthrough Performance for a Young Actress | Little Miss Sunshine | Won |
| 2006 | Chicago Film Critics Association | Best Supporting Actress | Little Miss Sunshine | Nominated |
| 2006 | Dublin Film Critics' Circle | Best Supporting Actress | Little Miss Sunshine | Won |
| 2006 | Gotham Awards | Breakthrough Actor | Little Miss Sunshine | Nominated |
| 2006 | Las Vegas Film Critics Society | Youth in Film | Little Miss Sunshine | Won |
| 2006 | Phoenix Film Critics Society | Best Performance by a Youth - Female | Little Miss Sunshine | Won |
| 2006 | Satellite Awards | Best Supporting Actress – Motion Picture | Little Miss Sunshine | Nominated |
| 2006 | St. Louis Film Critics Association | Best Supporting Actress | Little Miss Sunshine | Nominated |
| 2006 | Tokyo International Film Festival | Best Actress | Little Miss Sunshine | Won |
| 2006 | Women Film Critics Circle | Best Young Actress | Little Miss Sunshine | Won |
| 2007 | Academy Awards | Best Performance by an Actress in a Supporting Role | Little Miss Sunshine | Nominated |
| 2007 | British Academy Film Awards | Best Actress in a Supporting Role | Little Miss Sunshine | Nominated |
| 2007 | Critics Choice Movie Awards | Best Young Actress | Little Miss Sunshine | Won |
| 2007 | Empire Awards | Best Female Newcomer | Little Miss Sunshine | Nominated |
| 2007 | Gold Derby Film Awards | Best Supporting Actress | Little Miss Sunshine | Nominated |
| 2007 | Iowa Film Critics Association | Best Supporting Actress | Little Miss Sunshine | Won |
| 2007 | Online Film Critics Society | Best Supporting Actress | Little Miss Sunshine | Won |
| 2007 | Screen Actors Guild Awards | Outstanding Performance by a Female Actor in a Supporting Role | Little Miss Sunshine | Nominated |
| 2007 | Screen Actors Guild Awards | Outstanding Performance by a Cast in a Motion Picture | Little Miss Sunshine | Won |
| 2008 | Teen Choice Awards | Choice Movie Actress: Action Adventure | Nim's Island | Nominated |
| 2008 | Young Artist Award | Best Leading Young Actress - Feature Film | No Reservations | Nominated |
| 2009 | Young Artist Award | Best Leading Young Actress - Feature Film | Kit Kittredge: An American Girl | Nominated |
| 2009 | Women Film Critics Circle | Best Young Actress | Kit Kittredge: An American Girl | Won |
| 2010 | Young Artist Award | Best Leading Young Actress - Feature Film | My Sister's Keeper | Won |
| 2012 | Young Artist Award | Best Performance in a Voice-over Role, Young Actress | Rango | Nominated |
| 2013 | Screen Actors Guild Awards | Outstanding Performance by a Cast in a Motion Picture | August: Osage County | Nominated |
| 2016 | Fangoria Chainsaw Award | Best Actress | Maggie | Nominated |
