= Bill Nighy on screen and stage =

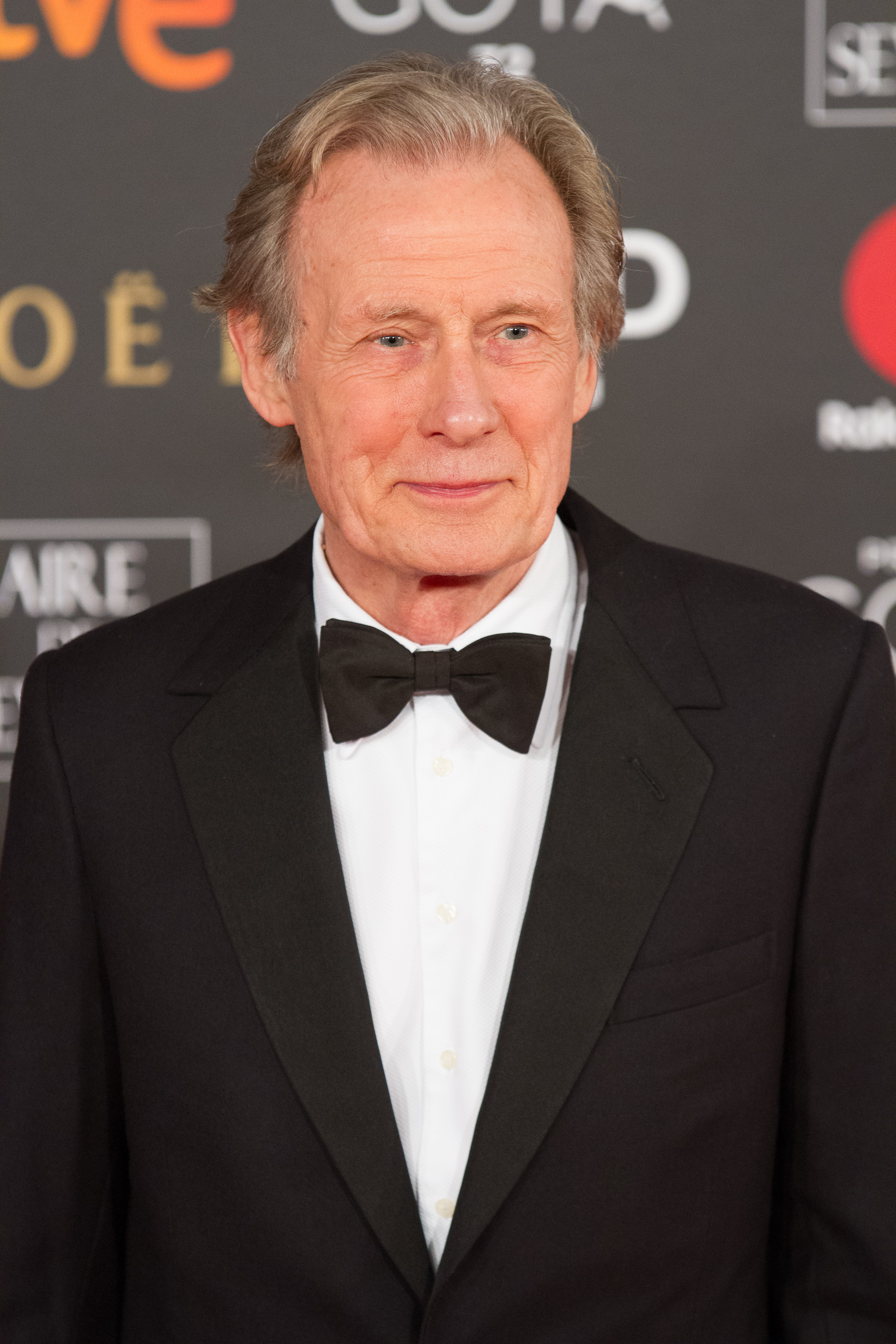
Bill Nighy at the Goya Awards in 2018

Bill Nighy (born 12 December 1949) is a British actor of the stage and screen.

== Film ==
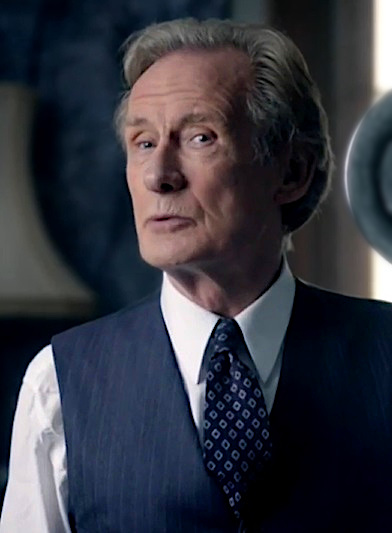
Nighy in Ordeal by Innocence 2018

Year	Film	Role(s)	Note
1979	The Bitch	Flower Delivery Boy (uncredited)	
1980	Death Watch	Man in 'Harriet Scene' (uncredited)	
1980	Little Lord Fauntleroy	Army officer (uncredited)	
1981	Eye of the Needle	Squadron Leader Blenkinsop	
1983	Curse of the Pink Panther	ENT Doctor	
1984	The Little Drummer Girl	Al	
1985	Hitler's SS: Portrait in Evil	Helmut Hoffmann	
1985	Thirteen at Dinner	Ronald Marsh	
1989	The Phantom of the Opera	Martin Barton	
1989	Mack the Knife	Tiger Brown	
1994	Being Human	Julian	
1996	True Blue	Jeremy Saville	
1996	Indian Summer	Tristan	
1997	FairyTale: A True Story	Edward Gardner	
1998	Still Crazy	Ray Simms	
1999	Guest House Paradiso	Mr. Johnson	
2001	Blow Dry	Raymond "Ray" Robertson	
2001	Lawless Heart	Dan	
2001	Lucky Break	Roger "Rog" Chamberlain	
2002	AKA	Uncle Louis Gryffoyn	
2003	Ready When You Are, Mr. McGill	Phil Parish	
2003	Love Actually	Billy Mack	
2003	I Capture the Castle	James Mortmain	
2003	Underworld	Viktor	
2004	Shaun of the Dead	Philip	
2004	Enduring Love	Robin	
2005	The Magic Roundabout	Dylan (voice)	UK version only
2005	The Hitchhiker's Guide to the Galaxy	Slartibartfast	
2005	The Constant Gardener	Sir Bernard Pellegrin	
2006	Pirates of the Caribbean: Dead Man's Chest	Davy Jones	
2006	Underworld: Evolution	Viktor	
2006	Stormbreaker	Alan Blunt	
2006	Flushed Away	Whitey (voice)	
2006	Notes on a Scandal	Richard Hart	
2007	Hot Fuzz	Chief Inspector Kenneth	
2007	Pirates of the Caribbean: At World's End	Davy Jones	
2008	Valkyrie	Friedrich Olbricht	
2008	A Fox's Tale	The Ringmaster	
2009	Underworld: Rise of the Lycans	Viktor	
2009	The Boat That Rocked	Quentin	
2009	G-Force	Leonard Saber	
2009	Astro Boy	Professor Simon Elefun/Robotsky (voices)	
2009	Glorious 39	Sir Alexander	
2010	Wild Target	Victor Maynard	
2010	Harry Potter and the Deathly Hallows – Part 1	Rufus Scrimgeour	
2011	Rango	Rattlesnake Jake (voice)	
2011	Chalet Girl	Richard	
2011	Arthur Christmas	Grandsanta (voice)	
2011	The Man with the Stolen Heart	Narrator (voice)	
2012	The Best Exotic Marigold Hotel	Douglas Ainslie	
2012	Wrath of the Titans	Hephaestus	
2012	Total Recall	Matthias Lair	
2013	Great White Shark 3D	Narrator (voice)	
2013	Jack the Giant Slayer	Fallon (voice)	
2013	The World's End	The Network (voice)	
2013	About Time	James Lake	
2014	I, Frankenstein	Naberius	
2014	Pride	Cliff	
2014	Turks & Caicos	Johnny Worricker	
2015	The Second Best Exotic Marigold Hotel	Douglas Ainslie	
2016	Dad's Army	Sergeant Wilson	
2016	Norm of the North	Socrates (voice)	
2016	Their Finest	Ambrose Hilliard/Uncle Frank	
2016	The Limehouse Golem	John Kildare	
2017	The Bookshop	Edmund Brundish	
2018	Sometimes Always Never	Alan	
2019	The Kindness of Strangers	Timofey	
2019	Detective Pikachu	Howard Clifford/Mewtwo (voices)	
2019	Hope Gap	Edward	
2019	StarDog and TurboCat	Sinclair (voice)	
2020	Emma.	Mr. Woodhouse	
2020	Minamata	Robert Hayes	
2021	Buckley's Chance	Spencer	
2022	Living	Mr. Rodney Williams	
2024	Role Play	Bob	
2024	The Beautiful Game	Mal	
2024	The First Omen	Lawrence	
2024	10 Lives	Professor Craven (voice)	
2024	Gracie & Pedro: Pets to the Rescue	Conrad (voice)	
2024	The Wild Robot	Longneck (voice)	
2024	Joy	Patrick Steptoe	
2024	Dragonkeeper	Danzi the Dragon (voice)	
2024	That Christmas	Bill (voice)	
2025	& Sons	Andrew Dyer	
2026	Shelter	Manafort	
2026	500 Miles	John	
TBA	Caine	TBA	Filming
TBA	Ibelin	TBA	Filming
TBA	The Turning Door	(voice)	Filming

== Television ==
Key
†	Denotes television productions that have not yet been released

Year	Title	Role	Notes
1976	Softly, Softly: Task Force	Albert Blake	Episode: "Say it with Flowers"
1978–1982	Play for Today	Dave/William/Bill	3 episodes
1979	Premier	Deasey	Episode: "Deasey"
1980	Agony	Vincent Fish	Season 2
1980	Fox	Colin Street	2 episodes
1980	BBC2 Playhouse	Bruno	Episode: "Standing in for Henry"
1982	Minder	Oates	Episode: "Looking for Micky"
1982	Play for Tomorrow	Connor Mullen	Episode: "Easter 2016"
1983	Reilly, Ace of Spies	Goschen	Episode: "1905: The Visiting Fireman"
1983	Jemima Shore Investigates	David Cullen	Episode: "A Model for Murder"
1984	Crown Court	Lee Sinclair	Episode: "The Son of His Father: Part 1"
1985	The Last Place on Earth	Cecil Meares	Miniseries: 4 episodes
1989	Storyboard	Sam	Episode: "Making News"
1990	Making News	Sam Courtney	6 episodes
1990	ScreenPlay	Howard Nash	Episode: "Antonia and Jane"
1990	TECX	Brill	Episode: "Writing on the Wall"
1991	The Men's Room	Mark Carleton	BBC serial
1991	Bergerac	Barry	Episode: "All For Love"
1991	Boon	Steve Reeves	Episode: "Pillow Talk"
1991–1993	Performance	Roger Maitland/Hugh Marriner	2 episodes
1992	Chiller	Tom Dickenson	Episode: "The Cat Brought It In"
1992	A Masculine Ending	John Tracey	Television film
1993	Eye of the Storm	Tom Frewen	6 episodes
1993	Peak Practice	Alan Sinclair	Episode: "Growing Pains"
1993	Don't Leave Me This Way	John Tracey	Television film
1993	The Maitlands	Roger Maitland	BBC TV production
1994	Wycliffe	David Cleeve	Episode: "The Four Jacks"
1996	Testament: The Bible in Animation	Belshazzar (voice)	Episode: "Daniel"
1997	Insiders	Mark Gordon	Episode: "The Vat Man"
1997	Kavanagh QC	Giles Culpepper QC	Episode: "Ancient History"
1999–2000	Kiss Me Kate	Ian	5 episodes
1998–2000	The Canterbury Tales	The Merchant	2 episodes
1999	People Like Us	Will Rushmore	Episode: "The Photographer"
2000	Longitude	Lord Sandwich	Television film
2000	Animated Tales of the World	Tiger (Voice)	Episode: "A Story of Taiwan: Aunt Tiger"
2002	Auf Wiedersehen, Pet	Jeffrey Grainger	Season 3
2002	The Inspector Lynley Mysteries	Alan Lockwood	Episode: "Well Schooled in Murder"
2003	State of Play	Cameron Foster	6 episodes
2003	Ready When You Are, Mr. McGill	Phil Parish	Television film
2003	The Lost Prince	Arthur Bigge, 1st Baron Stamfordham	Television film
2003	The Canterbury Tales	James	Episode: "The Wife of Bath"
2003	The Young Visiters	Earl of Clincham	Television film
2003	Life Beyond the Box: Norman Stanley Fletcher	Narrator (voice)	Television film
2004	He Knew He Was Right	Colonel Osborne	3 parts
2005	The Girl in the Café	Lawrence	Television film
2005	Gideon's Daughter	Gideon Warner	Television film
2006	Horizon	Narrator (voice)	Episode: "The Great Robot Race"
2009	10 Minute Tales	Mr Jellaby	Episode: "Statuesque"
2010	Doctor Who	Dr Black	Uncredited; episode: "Vincent and the Doctor"
2011	Page Eight	Johnny Worricker	Television films (The Worricker Trilogy)
2014	Turks & Caicos	Johnny Worricker	Television films (The Worricker Trilogy)
2014	Salting the Battlefield	Johnny Worricker	Television films (The Worricker Trilogy)
2017	Red Nose Day Actually	Billy Mack	Television short film
2018	Ordeal by Innocence	Leo Argyll	3 episodes
2019–present	The World's Most Scenic Railway Journeys	Narrator (voice)	Television series
2020–2021	Castlevania	Saint Germain (voice)	14 episodes
2021–present	World’s Most Scenic River Journeys	Narrator (voice)	Television series
2022	The Man Who Fell to Earth	Thomas Jerome Newton	9 episodes
2024	Kent: The Garden of England	Narrator (voice)	Television series
2025	Lazarus	Dr. Lazarus	Television series; 6 episodes
2026	Ride or Die	The Director	Television series; 7 episodes
2027	Star Trek: Starfleet Academy	Nyk Ake	Recurring role
TBA	Ascencion †	Zac	Main role
TBA	California Avenue †	Jerry	Filming; also executive producer
TBA	The Portrait of a Lady †	Mr. Touchett	Upcoming six-part series

== Theatre ==
Year	Title	Role	Playwright	Venue	Ref.
1969	Plaza Suite	Asst. Stage Manager	Neil Simon	Watermill Theatre, Newbury	
1969	The Milk Train Doesn't Stop Here Anymore	Performer	Tennessee Williams	Watermill Theatre, Newbury	
1971	Landscape and Silence	Performer	Harold Pinter	Gateway Theatre, Chester	
1971	Entertaining Mr Sloane	Mr. Sloane	Joe Orton	Gateway Theatre, Chester	
1971	Rosencrantz & Guildenstern Are Dead	Performer	Tom Stoppard	Arts Theatre, Cambridge	
1971	The Immoralist	Performer	André Gide	Hampstead Theatre	
1971	Speak Now	Timmy	Olwen Wymark	Traverse Theatre, Edinburgh	
1971	Under New Management	Harold	Chris Bond	Everyman Theatre, Liverpool	
1972	Freedom of the City	Skinnwe	Brian Friel	Everyman Theatre, Liverpool	
1976	Occupy!	Player		Everyman Theatre, Liverpool	
1977	Illuminatus!	Performer	Ken Campbell/Chris Langham	National Theatre, London	
1978	Comings and Goings	Vernon	Mike Stott	Hampstead Theatre Club	
1979	The Warp	Performer	Neil Oram/ Ken Campbell	Institute of Contemporary Arts, London	
1980	Illuminations	Gorman	Arthur Rimbaud	Lyric Hammersmith	
1983	A Map of the World	Stephen Andrews	David Hare	National Theatre, London	
1985	Pravda	Eaton Sylvester	David Hare/ Howard Brenton	National Theatre, London	
1986	King Lear	Edgar	William Shakespeare	National Theatre, London	
1987	Mean Tears	Julian	Peter Gill	National Theatre, Cottesloe	
1991	Betrayal	Jerry	Harold Pinter	Almeida Theatre, London	
1993	Arcadia	Bernard Nightingale	Tom Stoppard	National Theatre, London	
1994	The Seagull	Trigorin	Anton Chekhov	National Theatre, London	
1995–1997	Skylight	Tom Sergeant	David Hare	National Theatre, Vaudeville Theatre	UK tour
1998	A Kind of Alaska	Hornby	Harold Pinter	Donmar Warehouse	
2000–2001	Blue/Orange	Robert	Joe Penhall	National Theatre, Cottesloe; Duchess Theatre, London	
2006	The Vertical Hour	Oliver Lucas	David Hare	Music Box Theater, Broadway	
2014	Skylight	Tom Sergeant	David Hare	Wyndham's Theatre, West End	
2015	Skylight	Tom Sergeant	David Hare	John Golden Theatre, Broadway	

== Radio ==
Date	Title	Role	Station
1981	The Lord of the Rings	Sam Gamgee	BBC Radio 4
1983	Yes Minister	Frank Weisel	BBC Radio 4
1990	Pravda	Eaton Sylvester	BBC Radio 3
1993	Arcadia	Bernard Nightingale	BBC Radio 3
1994	Ancient Enemies	Unknown	BBC Radio 4
1996	Beaumarchais	Chevalier d'Éon/Lia de Beaumont	BBC Radio 4 Extra
1999	So Much Blood	Charles Paris	BBC Radio 4 Saturday Play
2002	Blue/Orange	Unknown	BBC Radio 4
2003	Baldi: The Book Case	O'Connor	BBC Radio 4 Afternoon Play
2003	Turtle Diary	William	BBC Radio 4 Saturday Play
2004	A Series of Murders	Charles Paris	BBC Radio 4 Saturday Play
2004	All Fingers and Thumbs	Tom	BBC Radio 4 Afternoon Play
2006	A Charles Paris Mystery: Sicken and So Die	Charles Paris	BBC Radio 4
2007	A Charles Paris Mystery: Murder Unprompted	Charles Paris	BBC Radio 4
2008	I Wish to Apologise for My Part in the Apocalypse	Keith	BBC Radio 4 Afternoon Play
2008	A Charles Paris Mystery: Dead Side of the Mic	Charles Paris	BBC Radio 4
2009	Educating Rita	Frank	BBC Radio 4 Saturday Play
2010	Private Lives	Elyot	BBC Radio 4 Saturday Play
2010	A Charles Paris Mystery: Cast in Order of Disappearance	Charles Paris	BBC Radio 4
2010	A Charles Paris Mystery: Murder in the Title	Charles Paris	BBC Radio 4
2011	The Bat Man	Christopher	BBC Radio 4 Afternoon Play
2013	Darkside	The Witch Finder / Doctor Antrobus	BBC Radio 2
2016	A Charles Paris Mystery: A Decent Interval	Charles Paris	BBC Radio 4
2019	A Charles Paris Mystery: Star Trap	Charles Paris	BBC Radio 4
2020	A Charles Paris Mystery: A Doubtful Death	Charles Paris	BBC Radio 4
2021	A Charles Paris Mystery: A Deadly Habit	Charles Paris	BBC Radio 4
2023	A Charles Paris Mystery: So Much Blood	Charles Paris	BBC Radio 4

== Video games ==
Year	Title	Voice
2009	G-Force	Leonard Saber
2013	Disney Infinity	Davy Jones
2014	The Elder Scrolls Online	High King Emeric
2014	Destiny	The Speaker
2015	The Elder Scrolls Online: Tamriel Unlimited	High King Emeric
2015	Disney Infinity 3.0	Davy Jones
2017	The Elder Scrolls Online: Morrowind	High King Emeric
2017	Destiny 2	The Speaker
2018	The Elder Scrolls Online: Summerset	High King Emeric
2019	The Elder Scrolls Online: Elsweyr	High King Emeric
2020	The Elder Scrolls Online: Greymoor	High King Emeric
2020	Kosmokrats	Narrator
2021	The Elder Scrolls Online: Blackwood	High King Emeric

== Theme park attractions ==
Year	Title	Role	Venue
2006	Pirates of the Caribbean	Davy Jones	Disneyland; Walt Disney World

== Audio drama ==
Year	Title	Role	Author	Production company	Notes
2021	The Sandman: Act II	Odin	Neil Gaiman, Dirk Maggs	Audible	

== Music video ==
Year	Song	Artist	Role
2022	"Free"	Florence + The Machine	Florence Welch's anxiety

== See also ==
- List of British actors
- List of British Academy Award nominees and winners
- List of actors with Academy Award nominations
