= List of awards and nominations received by Bill Nighy =

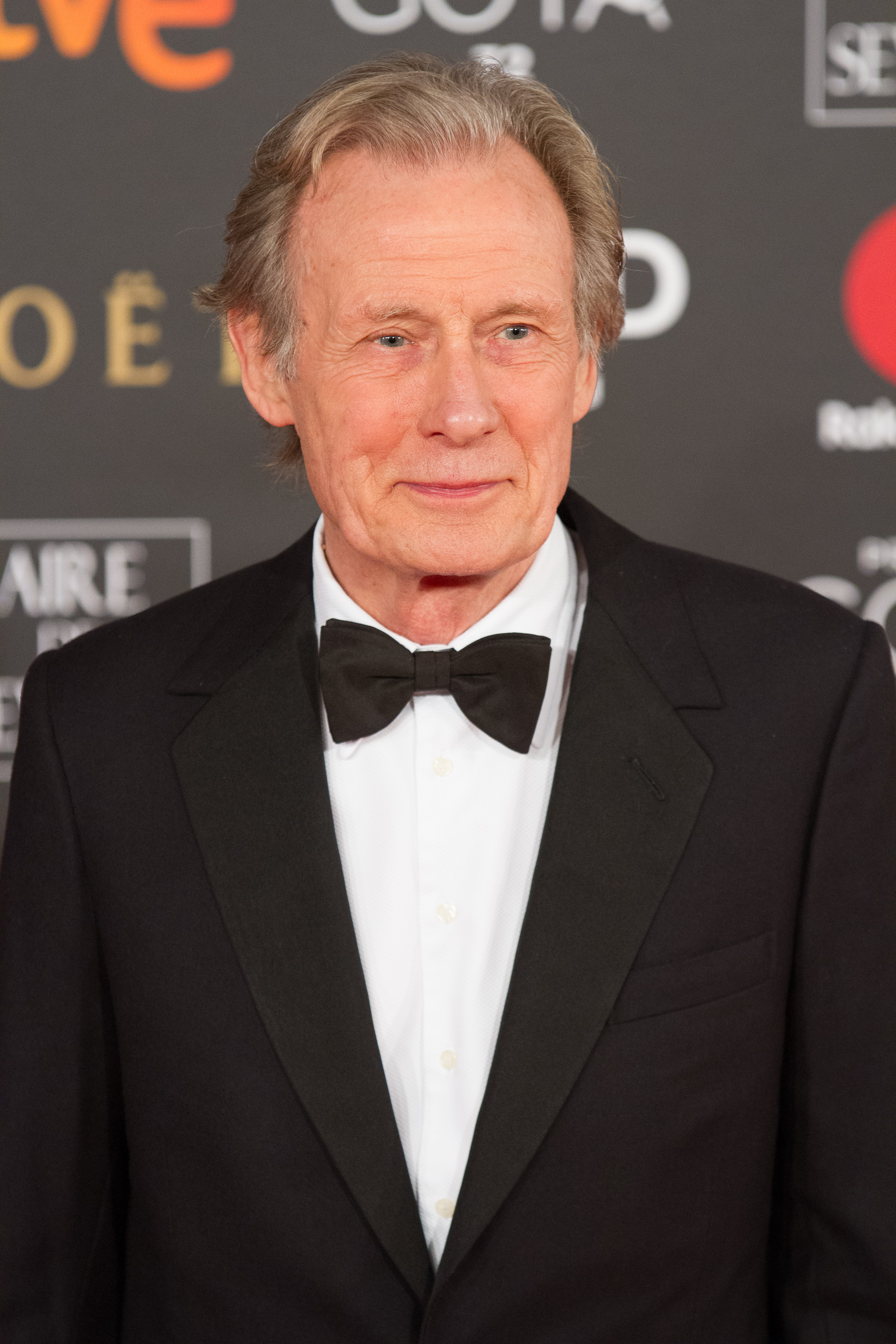
Nighy at the Goya Awards in 2018

Bill Nighy is an English actor of stage and screen.

Over his career he has received numerous accolades including a British Academy Film Award, a British Academy Television Award, and a Golden Globe Award as well as nominations for an Academy Award, two Screen Actors Guild Awards, a Laurence Olivier Award, and a Tony Award.

He has won a British Academy Film Award for his comedic supporting performance in Richard Curtis' romantic comedy Love Actually (2003). He received nominations for the Academy Award, BAFTA Award, Golden Globe Award, and Screen Actors Guild Award for Best Actor for his role as an elderly man with an illness in Living (2022). For his roles on television, he received a British Academy Television Award for his performance in the BBC One series State of Play (2003). Over his career he has earned three Golden Globe Award for Best Actor – Miniseries or Television Film nominations for his performances in the BBC / HBO film The Girl in the Café (2005), the BBC film Gideon's Daughter (2006), and the PBS movie Page Eight (2011).

For his theatre roles he received a Laurence Olivier Award for Best Actor for his role in the play Blue/Orange (2001). He received a Tony Award for Best Leading Actor in a Play starring opposite Carey Mulligan in the Broadway revival of David Hare's Skylight (2015).

== Major associations ==
=== Academy Awards ===
Year	Category	Nominated work	Result	Ref.
2023	Best Actor	Living	Nominated	

=== BAFTA Awards ===
Year	Category	Nominated work	Result	Ref.
British Academy Film Awards
2004	Best Actor in a Supporting Role	Love Actually	Won	
2023	Best Actor in a Leading Role	Living	Nominated	
British Academy Television Awards
2004	Best Actor	State of Play	Won	
2012	Best Single Drama	Page Eight	Nominated	

=== Golden Globe Awards ===
Year	Category	Nominated work	Result	Ref.
2006	Best Actor – Miniseries or Television Film	The Girl in the Café	Nominated	
2007	Best Actor – Miniseries or Television Film	Gideon's Daughter	Won	
2012	Best Actor – Miniseries or Television Film	Page Eight	Nominated	
2023	Best Actor – Motion Picture Drama	Living	Nominated	

=== Screen Actors Guild Awards ===
Year	Category	Nominated work	Result	Ref.
2013	Outstanding Cast in a Motion Picture	The Best Exotic Marigold Hotel	Nominated	
2023	Outstanding Actor in a Leading Role	Living	Nominated	

=== Laurence Olivier Awards ===
Year	Category	Nominated work	Result	Ref.
2001	Best Actor	Blue/Orange	Nominated	

=== Tony Awards ===
Year	Category	Nominated work	Result	Ref.
2015	Best Actor in a Play	Skylight	Nominated	

== Miscellaneous awards ==
=== Annie Awards ===
Year	Category	Nominated work	Result	Ref.
2011	Voice Acting in a Feature Production	Arthur Christmas	Won	

=== British Independent Film Awards ===
Year	Category	Nominated work	Result	Ref.
2002	Best Actor	Lawless Heart	Nominated	
2005	Best Supporting Actor	The Constant Gardener	Nominated	

=== Critics Choice Awards ===
Year	Category	Nominated work	Result	Ref.
Critics' Choice Television Awards
2012	Best Actor in a Movie/Miniseries	Page Eight	Nominated	

=== Evening Standard British Film Awards ===
Year	Category	Nominated work	Result	Ref.
1999	Peter Sellers Award for Comedy	Still Crazy	Won	
2004	Peter Sellers Award for Comedy	Love Actually	Won	

=== Goya Awards ===
Year	Category	Nominated work	Result	Ref.
2017	Best Supporting Actor	The Bookshop	Nominated	

=== MTV Movie Awards ===
Year	Category	Nominated work	Result	Ref.
2007	Best Villain	Pirates of the Caribbean: Dead Man's Chest	Nominated	

=== Satellite Awards ===
Year	Category	Nominated work	Result	Ref.
1998	Best Supporting Actor – Motion Picture	Still Crazy	Nominated	
2004	Best Supporting Actor – Motion Picture	Love Actually	Nominated	
2005	Best Supporting Actor – Television	The Lost Prince	Won	
2006	Best Actor – Miniseries or Television Film	Gideon's Daughter	Won	
2011	Best Actor – Miniseries or Television Film	Page Eight	Nominated	

=== Saturn Awards ===
Year	Category	Nominated work	Result	Ref.
2006	Best Supporting Actor	Pirates of the Caribbean: Dead Man's Chest	Nominated	
2008	Best Supporting Actor	Valkyrie	Nominated	
2013	Best Supporting Actor	About Time	Nominated	

=== Teen Choice Awards ===
Year	Category	Nominated work	Result	Ref.
2006	Choice Movie: Sleazebag	Pirates of the Caribbean: Dead Man's Chest	Won	
2007	Choice Movie: Villain	Pirates of the Caribbean: At World's End	Won	

== Critics awards ==
Year	Award	Category	Nominated work	Result	Ref.
2003	Washington D.C. Film Critics Award	Best Ensemble	Love Actually	Won	
2004	Phoenix Film Critics Society Awards	Best Cast	Love Actually	Nominated	
2004	Los Angeles Film Critics Association Award	Best Supporting Actor	AKA	Won	
2004	Los Angeles Film Critics Association Award	Best Supporting Actor	I Capture the Castle	Won	
2004	Los Angeles Film Critics Association Award	Best Supporting Actor	Lawless Heart	Won	
2004	Los Angeles Film Critics Association Award	Best Supporting Actor	Love Actually	Won	
2004	London Critics Circle Film Awards	Supporting Actor of the Year	Love Actually	Won	
2013	London Critics Circle Film Awards	Supporting Actor of the Year	About Time	Nominated	
2013	Utah Film Critics Association Awards	Best Supporting Actor	About Time	Won	

== See also ==
- List of British actors
- List of British Academy Award nominees and winners
- List of actors with Academy Award nominations
