= Laura Lamson =

American screenwriter

Laura Lamson (May 2, 1948 – October 13, 2008) was an American screenwriter and university lecturer who was based in England throughout her career. Her most successful work was her adaptation of The Men's Room for the BBC.

== Early life and education ==
Laura Lamson Kerstetter was born in Berea, Ohio, May 2, 1948. She spent much of her early life living around the Midwest. The only daughter of William and Leona Bateman Kerstetter, she had one sibling, a brother, William Jr. The family moved often as her father, a university professor, took jobs at various universities. They finally settled in Greencastle, Indiana in 1962 when her father became president of DePauw University.

Lamson returned to Ohio to study English and psychology at Ohio Wesleyan University. She spent a year studying in England where she met Christopher King and the couple married shortly afterwards in 1970 in Greencastle.

== Career ==
Lamson and King settled in England, where she began work in the media and he worked as a television director. She worked in London as a script reader for Columbia Pictures in 1980. Soon after, she began focusing upon script writing and one of her first screenplays was a feature film adaptation of Elizabeth Smart's poem By Grand Central Station I Sat Down and Wept. Despite interest from various producers, the film was never made. However, the quality of the script opened doors for Lamson.

She and King divorced in 1986, and she brought up their two young sons, Matthew and Jamie, as a single parent. Matthew is a television producer and Jamie is an actor. In the early 1990s, she found success with an adaptation of Ann Oakley's 1989 book The Men's Room starring Dame Harriet Walter, detailing sexual impulses in the workplace. Leading actor Bill Nighy, who played Mark Carleton, said the mini-series launched his career. The five-part series for the BBC was well received by both the press and the public.

The success of The Men's Room brought Lamson further work as a television writer. She continued to specialise in adaptations, writing the screenplays for Gillian Wright's The Rich Deceiver in 1995, Peter James' The Alchemists in 1999 and Agatha Christie's Sparkling Cyanide in 2003. In the mid-2000s, Lamson moved into the field of television documentaries, writing Nuremberg: Nazis on Trial, Wren: the Man Who Built Britain, Gertrude Jekyll, Asylum Wars, Against All Odds, and Michelangelo.

To supplement her work as a screenwriter, she taught at English universities, becoming a professor on the MA Screenwriting course at Leeds Metropolitan University and the MA Creative Writing course at Birkbeck, University of London.

== Later life ==
She was diagnosed with cancer in 2007, and resolved to reconnect with her U.S. homeland, setting off on a road trip with close friend Ashtar Alkhirsan. She was writing a travel memoir, but her illness prevented its completion. She died the following year on October 13, 2008, at age 60. She was survived by her sons and her brother.
