= Bill Nighy =

British actor (born 1949)

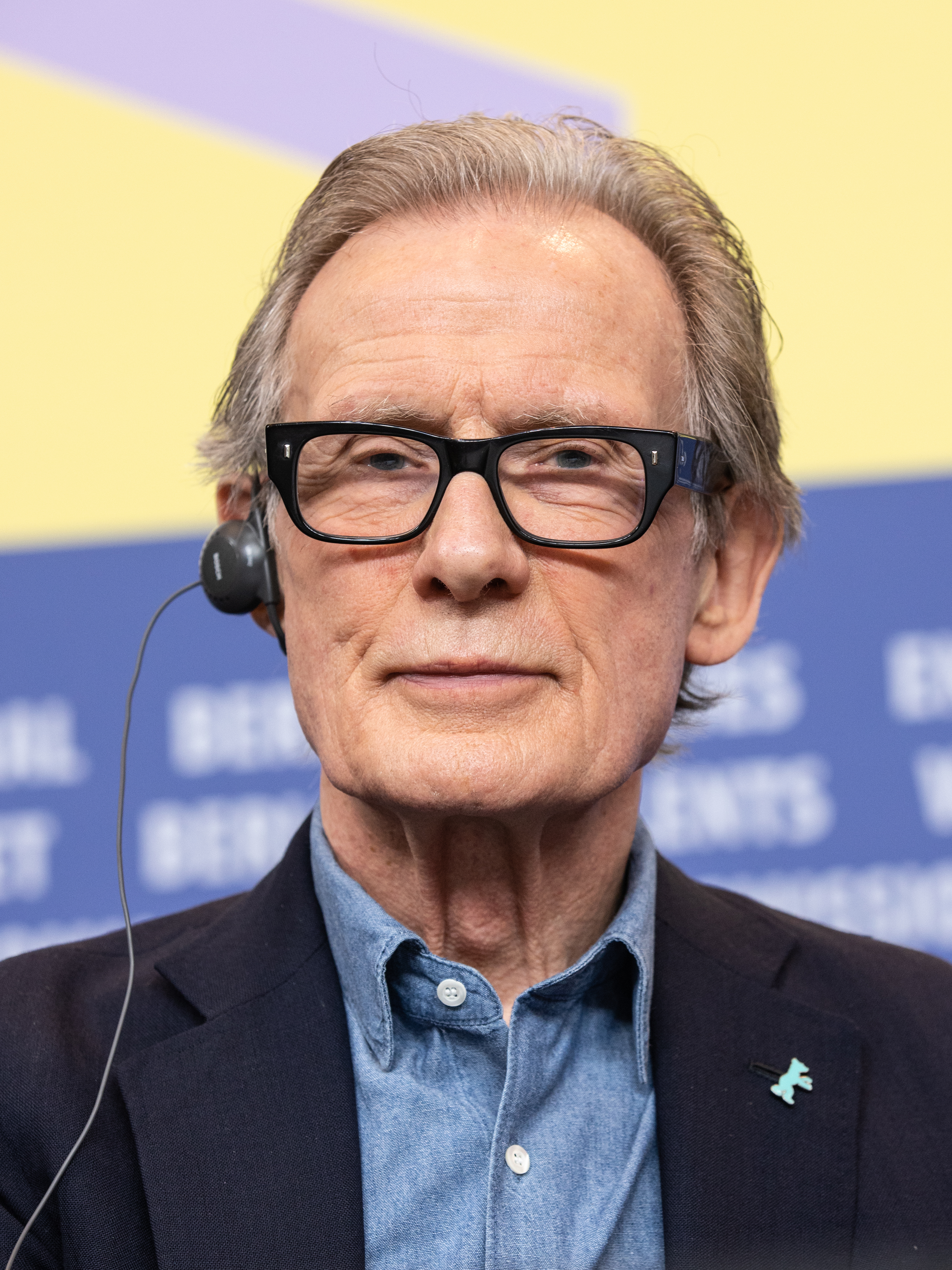
- Bill Nighy in 2020
- Born: William Francis Nighy; 12 December 1949 (age 76); Caterham, Surrey, England
- Education: Guildford School of Acting
- Occupation: Actor
- Years active: 1969–present
- Works: Full list
- Partner: Diana Quick (1982–2008)
- Children: Mary Nighy
- Awards: Full list

William Francis Nighy (/naɪ/; born 12 December 1949) is a British actor. Known for his work on stage and screen, he has received various accolades including two BAFTA Awards and a Golden Globe Award, in addition to nominations for an Academy Award, a Tony Award, a Laurence Olivier Award and two Screen Actors Guild Awards.

Nighy started his career with the Everyman Theatre, Liverpool, and made his London debut with the Royal National Theatre starting with The Illuminatus! in 1977. He gained acclaim for his roles in David Hare's Pravda in 1985, Harold Pinter's Betrayal in 1991, Tom Stoppard's Arcadia in 1993, and Anton Chekhov's The Seagull in 1994. He received a Laurence Olivier Award for Best Actor nomination for his role in Blue/Orange in 2001. He acted on Broadway in the David Hare plays The Vertical Hour (2006) and Skylight (2015), earning a Tony Award for Best Actor in a Play nomination for the latter.

Nighy's early film roles include the comedies Still Crazy (1998), Guest House Paradiso (1999) and Blow Dry (2001). He rose to international stardom with his role in Love Actually (2003), which earned him a BAFTA Award for Best Supporting Actor. He went on to portray Viktor in the Underworld film series (2003–2009) and Davy Jones in the Pirates of the Caribbean film series (2006–2007). His other films include Shaun of the Dead (2004), The Hitchhiker's Guide to the Galaxy (2005), The Constant Gardener (2005), Notes on a Scandal (2006), Hot Fuzz (2007), Valkyrie (2008), Wild Target (2010), Harry Potter and the Deathly Hallows – Part 1 (2010), The Best Exotic Marigold Hotel (2012), About Time (2013), Emma (2020), and Living (2022), the last of which earned him a nomination for the Academy Award for Best Actor.

Nighy has gained acclaim for his roles in television, earning a BAFTA Award for his role in BBC One series State of Play (2003), and a Golden Globe Award for Best Actor for the BBC film Gideon's Daughter (2007). He is also known for his roles in The Girl in the Café (2006), the BBC's Worricker trilogy which includes Page Eight (2012), Turks & Caicos (2014), and Salting the Battlefield (2014), and the BBC's Ordeal by Innocence (2018).

== Early life and education ==
William Francis Nighy was born in Caterham, Surrey, the son of Alfred Martin Nighy and Catherine Josephine Whittaker. His father managed a car garage after working in the family chimney sweeping business; his mother was a psychiatric nurse of Irish descent born in Glasgow, Scotland.

Nighy was brought up as a Roman Catholic and served as an altar boy; however, he gave up "being a practising Catholic" as a teenager. He has two elder siblings. He attended the John Fisher School, a Roman Catholic grammar school in Purley, where he was nicknamed "Knucks" because of his hands. It was at John Fisher that he gained his first experience as an actor, with his "reasonable" memory earning him longer lines in the plays.

As a child Nighy was known by many to be insecure and shy; as a teenager he became an avid reader, particularly enjoying the works of Ernest Hemingway and F. Scott Fitzgerald. He left school at the age of 15, without qualifications, and later with a friend travelled to Paris hoping and failing "to write a novel".

Nighy worked variously in a local employment office and as a messenger for The Croydon Advertiser and The Field. He then applied for a place at RADA, but was rejected and instead enrolled at the Guildford School of Dance and Drama to train for the stage.

== Career ==
=== 1969–1984: Early roles ===
After working in various regional theatre productions during his early twenties in theatres such as the Cambridge Arts Theatre and Edinburgh's Traverse Theatre, a friend of Nighy's suggested that he audition for the Everyman Theatre in Liverpool. During his audition he asked to start again about five times, according to fellow actor Jonathan Pryce, who said that "either he was a very good actor, or a madman". During his time at the Everyman he worked alongside fellow actors Julie Walters and Pete Postlethwaite, and writers Ken Campbell and Willy Russell. He was also a member of the travelling theatre group Van Load, which included one of Nighy's most frequent collaborators, writer and director David Hare.

Nighy made his London stage debut at the National Theatre in an epic staging of Ken Campbell and Chris Langham's Illuminatus!, after he met Campbell at a bar in London. When Nighy told him that he was an actor, Campbell hired him on the spot. It opened the new Cottesloe Theatre on 4 March 1977. He was cast in two David Hare premieres, A Map of The World and Pravda, also at the National. Nighy starred in three episodes of the British anthology series Play For Today from 1978 to 1982. He played Samwise Gamgee in the 1981 BBC Radio dramatisation of The Lord of the Rings (credited as William Nighy), and was heard in the 1980s BBC Radio version of Yes Minister.

=== 1985–1999: National Theatre and acclaim ===
After Nighy made his debut, he steadily gained acclaim with his performances in David Hare's Pravda in 1985, William Shakespeare's King Lear in 1986 and Anton Chekov's The Seagull in 1994. At the National Theatre, he acted in productions alongside Anthony Hopkins, Judi Dench, Harriet Walter, Rufus Sewell and Chiwetel Ejiofor. Nighy's most acclaimed stage performances were in National Theatre productions. As Bernard Nightingale, an unscrupulous university don, in Tom Stoppard's Arcadia (1993), he engaged in witty exchanges with Felicity Kendal, who played Hannah Jarvis, an author.

Nighy played Jerry in Harold Pinter's Betrayal in 1991 at the Almeida Theatre. He played a consultant psychiatrist in Joe Penhall's Blue/Orange (2000), for which he received an Olivier Award nomination for Best Actor. It transferred to the West End at the Duchess Theatre the following year. In 1997, he starred as restaurant entrepreneur Tom Sergeant in David Hare's Skylight, which had premiered in 1995 and was moved to the Vaudeville Theatre. He played a libidinous young disc jockey, Vincent Fish, in the 1980 comedy series Agony, where he was the occasional lover of the lead character, played by Maureen Lipman. He also starred in two episodes of the BBC series Performance in 1991 and 1993.

One of Nighy's early major screen appearances was the BBC serial The Men's Room (1991). He claimed that the serial, an Ann Oakley novel adapted by Laura Lamson, was the job that launched his career. He received some recognition by American audiences for his acclaimed character portrayal of fifty-year-old rock star Ray Simms in the 1998 film Still Crazy. In 1999 he gained further prominence in the UK with the starring role in "The Photographer", an episode of the award-winning BBC-TV mockumentary comedy series People Like Us, playing Will Rushmore, a middle aged man who has abandoned his career and family in the deluded belief that he can achieve success as a commercial photographer. Since 1999, Nighy has played Simon Brett's fictional amateur sleuth Charles Paris at least 17 times on BBC Radio 4.

=== 2000–2009: Career expansion ===
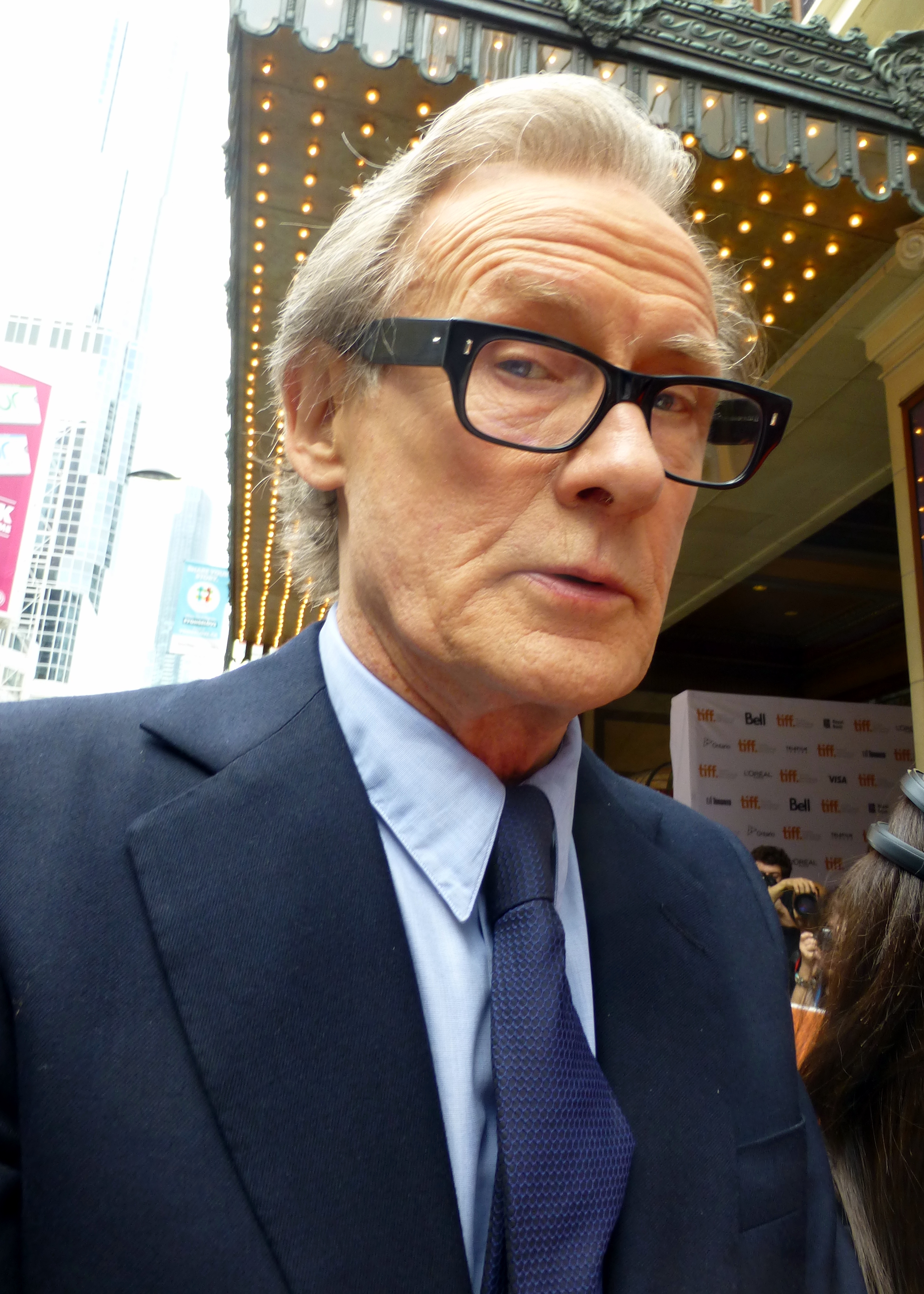
Nighy at the 2014 Toronto International Film Festival in Canada

In 2003, Nighy played the role of the Vampire Elder Viktor in the American production Underworld. (He returned to that role in the sequel Underworld: Evolution in 2006, and again in the prequel Underworld: Rise of the Lycans in 2009.) In the same year he portrayed Billy Mack, an irreverent rock'n'roll legend, in the British ensemble romantic comedy film Love Actually, for which he was awarded the BAFTA Award for Best Supporting Actor. At the BAFTA Television Awards in April 2004, he won the Best Actor award for State of Play. He also appeared in the comedy Shaun of the Dead. In early 2004, The Sunday Times reported that Nighy was on the shortlist for the role of the Ninth Doctor in the 2005 revival of the BBC television series Doctor Who. Christopher Eccleston ultimately filled the role. In 2005, he appeared as Slartibartfast in the film adaptation of The Hitchhiker's Guide to the Galaxy.

In 2005, he acted in the Fernando Meirelles-directed drama The Constant Gardener alongside Ralph Fiennes and Rachel Weisz. He also starred in the one-off BBC One comedy-drama The Girl in the Café alongside Kelly MacDonald for which he received a nomination for the Golden Globe Award for Best Actor – Miniseries or Television Film. In February 2006, he appeared in scriptwriter Stephen Poliakoff's one-off drama Gideon's Daughter. Nighy played the lead character, Gideon, a successful events organiser who begins to lose touch with the world around him. This performance won him a Golden Globe Award for Best Actor in a Mini-series or TV Film in January 2007. Also in 2006, Nighy made his Broadway debut alongside Julianne Moore in the David Hare play The Vertical Hour, directed by Sam Mendes at the Music Box Theatre. David Rooney of Variety gave the production a mixed review, writing that "Stuffed with stimulating insights, it's never dull but ultimately feels as messy and unresolved as the conflict behind its central debate. Sam Mendes' production does have one reason for unstinting recommendation, however, in Bill Nighy's fascinatingly eccentric performance."

In 2006, Nighy played the principal villain, Davy Jones, in Pirates of the Caribbean: Dead Man's Chest with his face entirely obscured by computer-generated makeup. He voiced the character with a Scots accent. He reprised the role in the 2007 sequel, Pirates of the Caribbean: At World's End, in which his real face was briefly revealed in one scene. He also provided the narration for the Animal Planet series Meerkat Manor. In 2006 he played the role of Richard Hart in the Richard Eyre-directed drama Notes on a Scandal, alongside Judi Dench and Cate Blanchett. For the role he was nominated for a London Film Critics' Circle award. Nighy also appeared as General Friedrich Olbricht, one of the principal conspirators, in the 2008 film Valkyrie. He had played an SS officer in the 1985 Hitler's SS: Portrait in Evil. He starred in the film Wild Target in 2010. In July 2009, he announced that he would play Rufus Scrimgeour in Harry Potter and the Deathly Hallows – Part 1. Nighy had already worked with director David Yates twice, and with the majority of the Harry Potter cast in previous films. He has said of his role as Rufus Scrimgeour that it meant he was no longer the only English actor not to be in Harry Potter.

=== 2010–2019: Established actor ===
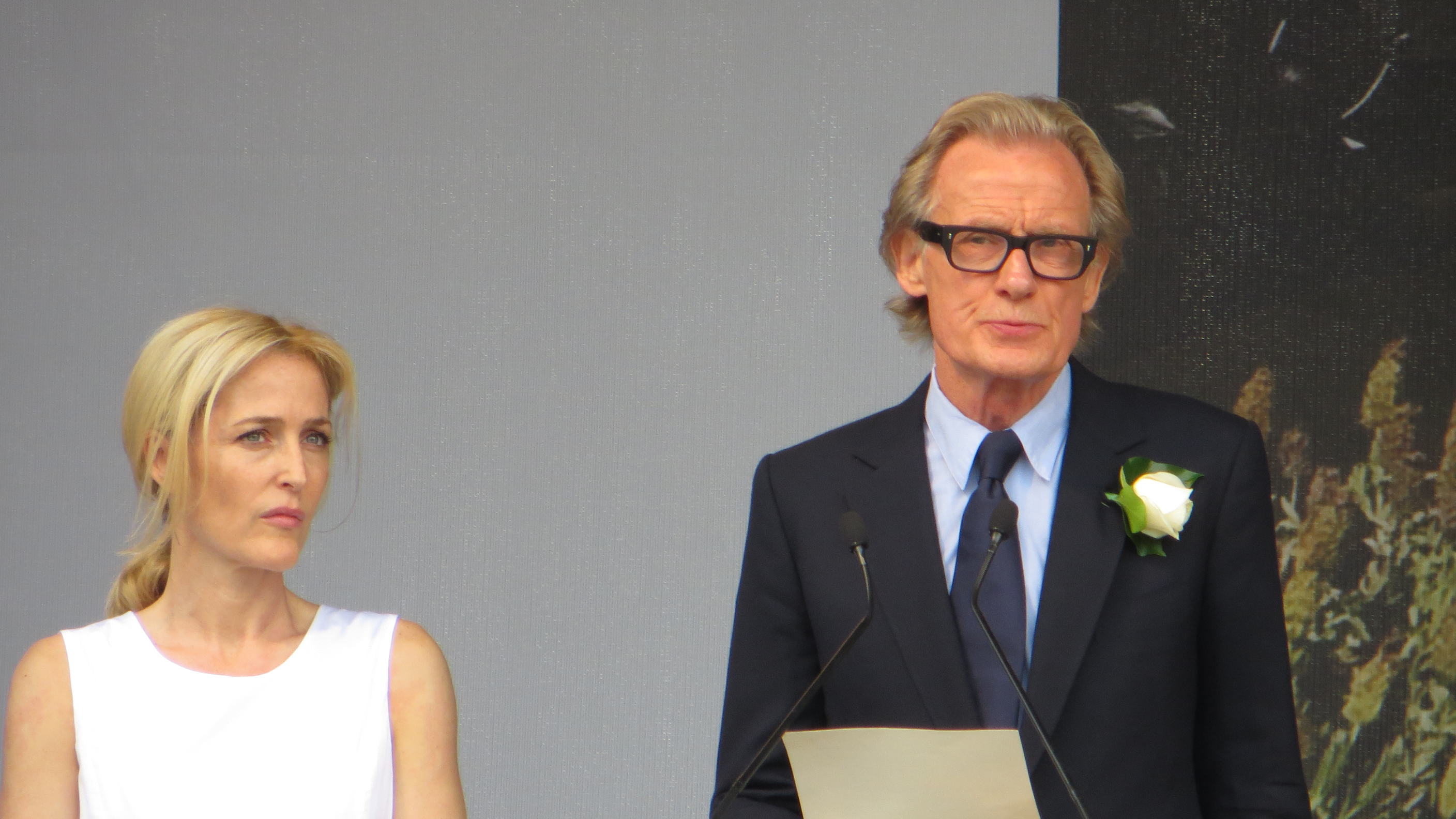
Gillian Anderson and Nighy in 2016

In 2010, he made a small cameo in Doctor Who, in the episode titled "Vincent and the Doctor". Nighy voiced Grandsanta in the 2011 animated film Arthur Christmas. In 2012, he starred in the British romantic comedy The Best Exotic Marigold Hotel acting opposite Judi Dench, Dev Patel, Tom Wilkinson, and Maggie Smith. Nighy along with the ensemble received a nomination for the Screen Actors Guild Award for Outstanding Performance by a Cast in a Motion Picture. That same year he acted in the action films Wrath of the Titans starring Sam Worthington and Ralph Fiennes and the remake of Total Recall starring Colin Farrell. In 2013, he played a role in Darkside, Tom Stoppard's radio drama based on Pink Floyd's album The Dark Side of the Moon. In 2014 he acted in the historical comedy-drama film Pride and the science-fiction fantasy film I, Frankenstein.

During this time Nighy played MI5 agent Johnny Worricker in a trilogy of films written and directed by David Hare; Page Eight (2011), Turks & Caicos (2014), and Salting the Battlefield (2014). Nighy acted in these films alongside Rachel Weisz, Ralph Fiennes, Helena Bonham Carter, and Michael Gambon. For his performance in Page Eight he received nominations for the British Academy Television Award for Best Single Drama and the Golden Globe Award for Best Actor – Miniseries or Television Film. In 2014, he starred with Carey Mulligan in a revival of David Hare's Skylight at Wyndham's Theatre in London's West End. It had a large international audience via broadcast in the National Theatre Live series. Nighy returned to Broadway starring in the transfer in Skylight alongside Mulligan where they both received nominations for the Tony Awards for Best Actor in a Play and Best Actress in a Play respectively. That same year he starred in the sequel to The Best Exotic Marigold Hotel, titled The Second Best Exotic Marigold Hotel (2015).

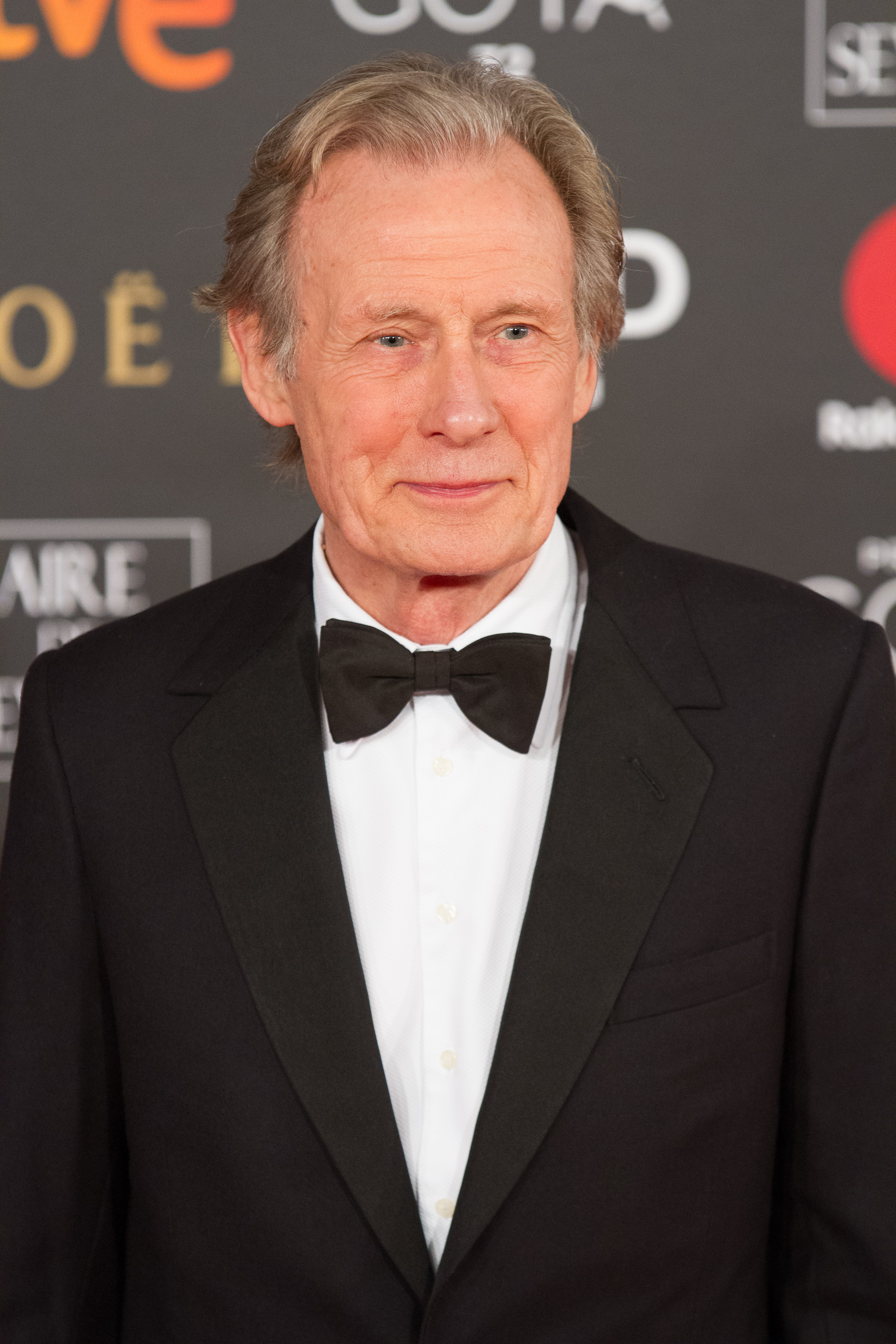
Nighy in 2018

The following year he acted in the war film Their Finest (2016) where it premiered at the Toronto International Film Festival to positive reviews. Peter Bradshaw of The Guardian praised Nighy, describing him as "a colossally proportioned scene-stealer". In that year he was in several films, including the British war comedy Dad's Army, the animated feature Norm of the North and the horror-mystery The Limehouse Golem. In 2017, acting alongside Emily Mortimer, he starred in the drama The Bookshop, based on the 1978 novel of the same title by Penelope Fitzgerald. That same year he was in the short film Red Nose Day Actually, reprising his role of Billy Mack from Love Actually (2003). Most of the actors from the original film appeared, including Hugh Grant, Liam Neeson, Colin Firth and Keira Knightley. The film aired on BBC One as part of the Red Nose Day 2017 fundraising event. In 2018, he starred in the three-episode BBC One series Ordeal by Innocence, an adaptation of the 1958 detective novel of the same name by Agatha Christie.

=== 2020–present: Living and critical acclaim ===
In 2020, he appeared as Mr Woodhouse, Emma's father, in Autumn de Wilde's Emma (2020) starring alongside Anya Taylor-Joy. The film received positive reviews. Variety film critic Andrew Barker praised the casting of Nighy as Emma's father, writing that the decision was an "uncontested layup of casting". In October 2020, it was announced that Nighy would play the leading role in Living, an English-language adaptation of Akira Kurosawa’s 1952 Japanese drama Ikiru, to be directed by Oliver Hermanus from a screenplay by Kazuo Ishiguro. Shooting began in spring 2021 in locations across the UK, including London and Worthing. The film premiered at Sundance in January 2022, where Nighy's performance in particular received high praise. For his performance he went on to receive nominations for the Academy Award, BAFTA Award, Golden Globe Award, and Screen Actors Guild Award for Best Actor.

In the 2022 TV series The Man Who Fell to Earth Nighy played Thomas Newton, the first alien resident of Earth, who arrived over 40 years ago. This role originally was played by David Bowie in the 1976 film adaptation. Nighy is also the narrator of the Channel 5 travel show The World's Most Scenic Railway Journeys, a programme that began its fifth series in autumn 2021 with episodes featuring train journeys across Australia and the Welsh borders. In 2022, Nighy became a DJ on BBC 6 Music when he stood in for Guy Garvey on the regular Sunday afternoon programme Guy Garvey's Finest Hour, with Nighy deputising for the Elbow frontman again at the beginning of 2023. He later deputised for Iggy Pop on his show Iggy Confidential from March to April 2023, and again in December 2023.

In October 2025, Nighy joined the voice cast of the upcoming animated fantasy film The Turning Door, alongside Alicia Vikander, Jamie Dornan, Gillian Anderson and Jodie Turner-Smith. He will appear as Nike Ake, the estranged father of Captain Nahla Ake (played by Holly Hunter) in the second and final season of the Star Trek spinoff series Star Trek: Starfleet Academy in 2027.

== Personal life ==
Beginning in 1982, Nighy was in a relationship with English actress Diana Quick, after they both played in David Hare's A Map of The World. They have a daughter, actress and filmmaker Mary Nighy, born in 1984, and two grandchildren. The pair separated in 2008. For a time he and Welsh actress Beth Morris were partners.

Nighy has Dupuytren's contracture. The condition can, depending on its severity, cause contractures of the fingers, most commonly the ring and little fingers.

Nighy is a supporter of Crystal Palace F.C. He is a patron of the Crystal Palace Children's Charity (CPCC) and of the Ann Craft Trust. He is also an honorary patron of the London children's charity Scene & Heard.

Nighy is a patron of the Milton Rooms, a new arts centre in Malton, North Yorkshire, along with Imelda Staunton, Jools Holland and Kathy Burke.

Nighy is a supporter of the Robin Hood tax campaign, and starred in a video in support of it.

Nighy supports "total gender equality", noting in an interview he gave during the 2016 DIFF film festival that the highlighting of gender inequality problems in the film industry had influenced his choice of film roles. He has also spoken of his role in Pride, a film extolling the mutual support between the National Union of Miners and gay rights groups in the UK in the 1980s, as one of his most cherished.

In 2004, Nighy was a guest on Desert Island Discs, presented by Sue Lawley. One of his chosen discs was "Won't Get Fooled Again" by The Who, so that he could practise his hobby of air guitar while marooned. As his luxury, he chose a boxed set of blues harp harmonicas and instruction book.

Nighy is noted for his bespoke navy suits. He was listed as one of the 50 best-dressed over-50s by The Guardian in March 2013 and one of GQ's 50 best-dressed British men in 2015.

Nighy became a fan of the Pokémon franchise during the production of Detective Pikachu, in which he played Howard Clifford. He has said that Mew is his favourite Pokémon.

For many years, Nighy struggled with substance issues, particularly alcoholism, a topic he rarely discusses, and has been a "sober alcoholic" since 17 May 1992. He gave up smoking in 2003.

During his twenties Nighy was in a band called the Love Ponies, and subsequently recorded a few songs.

Nighy lives in Pimlico, London.

== See also ==
- List of British actors
- List of Academy Award winners and nominees from Great Britain
- List of actors with Academy Award nominations
