= No Commitments =

UK radio drama

- Genre: Comedy drama
- Running time: 30 minutes
- Country of origin: United Kingdom
- Language: English
- Home station: BBC Radio 4
- Starring: Rosemary Leach; Nicola Pagett; Angela Thorne; Celia Imrie; Josie Lawrence; Felicity Montagu; Lisa Coleman; Jonathan Coy; Bill Nighy
- Created by: Simon Brett
- Written by: Simon Brett
- Produced by: Paul Schlesinger; Anne Jobson; Maria Esposito; Simon Brett
- Original release: 9 January 1992 – 16 May 2007
- No. of series: 13
- No. of episodes: 78
- Audio format: Stereophonic sound
- Website: BBC website

No Commitments is a radio drama written by Simon Brett, originally broadcast on BBC Radio 4 and now on BBC Radio 4 Extra. It ran for 13 series, from 1992 to 2007. The sitcom portrays the day-to-day lives of three very different sisters. All 13 series are now available as audiobooks.

== Main characters ==
- Anna is the eldest and most level-headed of the three sisters. Having cared for her father for some years, on his death she inherited the family home. Generally happy and contented with life, she suddenly finds herself free to put herself first for once, now she genuinely has No Commitments, despite her sisters' belief that she requires their assistance in managing her personal life. She works as receptionist to Eddie, a misogynistic dentist.
- Victoria lives out her rôle as the middle class housewife in Beckenham, a London suburb. With her dull long-suffering financial director husband Roger, and their three children, Emily, Harriet and Benjy, she tries to maintain the family's social reputation, at all costs. Emily (who over time grows from a child to a new mother) finds her aunt Anna a more sympathetic confidante than her mother. Of the other children, Harriet features once and Benjy is not heard from at all in the series.
- Charlotte is the youngest sister, and longs to be a famous actress. Lacking somewhat in both talent and self-awareness, she stumbles from one small acting rôle to the next, finally finding a small amount of success in a little-known television soap opera. She seems to progress through serial lovers at about the same rate, often with the expectation that the casting couch will lead to the bed, or vice versa. She has one daughter, Gisele, the result of a brief marriage to an Australian actor, who has more success in her parents' profession after a period working for charities in Africa. Like Benjy, Gisele is never heard from directly.

== Cast and crew ==
=== Regular cast ===
- Anna – Rosemary Leach
- Victoria

Nicola Pagett (series 1–5)
Angela Thorne (series 6–13)

- Charlotte

Celia Imrie (series 1, 3–8, 10, 12)
Josie Lawrence (series 2)
Felicity Montagu (series 9, 11, 13)

- Roger

Stephen Moore (series 1)
Roger Lloyd-Pack (series 2)
Jonathan Coy (series 3, 4, 12, 13)
Bill Nighy (series 5, 6, 7, 8, 9, 10, 11)

- Eddie – James Greene
- Delia (series 1) – Maxine Audley
- Emily

Lisa Coleman (series 2–4, 6–13)
Natalie Walter (series 5)

- Nick – Kieran Hill (series 10–13)

=== Production ===
- Music – Elizabeth Parker of the BBC Radiophonic Workshop
- Producer

Paul Schlesinger (series 1, 2)
Anne Jobson (series 3, 4)
Maria Esposito (series 5, 6)
Simon Brett (series 10–13)

== Episode list ==
Series	Episode	Title	First broadcast	Additional cast
1	1	Sisters Of Mercy	9 January 1992	
1	2	Empty Vessels	16 January 1992	Patrick – Andrew Wincott
1	3	A Nice Civilized Evening	23 January 1992	Dr Fenton – Benjamin Whitrow, Melvyn – Ronald Herdman, The Two Hilarys – Mark Straker, Theresa Streatfeild
1	4	Cracks In The Varnish	30 January 1992	Malcolm – Robert Bathurst, Dr Radford – Peter Penry-Jones, Georgio – Nicholas Murchie
1	5	Old Embers	6 February 1992	Guy – David Swift, Wilson – Neil Roberts
1	6	A Complete Break	13 February 1992	Patrick – Nicholas Murchie, Mrs Motson – Alison Reid
2	1	Frail Memorials	29 July 1993	Judy – Theresa Gallagher, John Lassiter – Dominic Letts, Jeremy – Ronald Herdman
2	2	Bright Lights	5 August 1993	Jeremy – Ronald Herdman, Georgio – Dominic Letts
2	3	The Big Break	12 August 1993	Dan – Andrew Wincott, Terry – Theresa Gallagher
2	4	Bed And Breakfast	19 August 1993	Lady Dunn – Jilly Mears, Gareth – William Osborne, Sir James – Philip Anthony
2	5	Affair Exchange	26 August 1993	Tim – Simon Treves, Georgio – David Thorpe
2	6	Twice Bitten	2 September 1993	Gordon – John Baddeley
3	1	Time Shift	24 November 1994	Will – David Antrobus, Georgio – Michael Tudor-Barnes
3	2	Material Values	1 December 1994	
3	3	Talking Shop	8 December 1994	Lallie – Rachel Atkins
3	4	An Ill Wind	15 December 1994	
3	5	Seasonal Adjustment	22 December 1994	Tibor – Jonathan Keeble
3	6	A Man Who Cares	29 December 1994	Pete – Derek Waring, Derek – Ian Masters
4	1	A Nip In The Air	24 July 1996	Burton – Kim Wall
4	2	Educated Guesswork	31 July 1996	
4	3	Faith, Hope And Very Little Charity	7 August 1996	
4	4	One Gets Better	14 August 1996	Harriet – Kelda Holmes
4	5	Not A Leg To Stand On	21 August 1996	
4	6	Two At A Time	28 August 1996	Martin – Geoffrey Whitehead, Jason – Joshua Towb
5	1	Family Business	9 July 1998	
5	2	Who You Know	16 July 1998	
5	3	Charity Begins At Home	23 July 1998	Imelda – Buffy Davis, Des Kitchin – Dave Lamb
5	4	Surprise Surprise	30 July 1998	
5	5	Running In The Family	6 August 1998	Nigel – Jon Glover
5	6	Rallying Round	13 August 1998	Stuart – Edward de Souza
6	1	Make My Day	14 July 1999	Stuart – Edward de Souza, Rupert – Christian Rodska
6	2	Excess Baggage	21 July 1999	Stuart – Edward de Souza, Claudia – Joanna Monro
6	3	Making It Better	28 July 1999	Mark – Will Ing
6	4	Retiring Types	4 August 1999	
6	5	Spreading Wings	11 August 1999	the secretary – Jane Gibson, the waiter – Alan Cowan
6	6	Growing Away	18 August 1999	
7	1	Supporting Parts	31 January 2001	
7	2	A Family Lunch	7 February 2001	
7	3	Soft Soap	14 February 2001	
7	4	Reflected Glory	21 February 2001	
7	5	The Wedding Party	28 February 2001	
7	6	Soap Bubbles	7 March 2001	
8	1	Fresh Starts	2 January 2002	
8	2	New Age Differences	9 January 2002	
8	3	My Turn Now	16 January 2002	
8	4	Wanderlust	23 January 2002	
8	5	Impossibly High Standards	30 January 2002	
8	6	All Roads Lead To Rome	6 February 2002	
9	1	Ill Of The Dead	1 January 2003	Vincent - Bruce Alexander
9	2	Changing Lives	8 January 2003	Peter - Colin Starkey
9	3	Imaginary Friends	15 January 2003	Richard - Jason Done, Paula - Natalie Casey
9	4	Meeting The Family	22 January 2003	Paula - Natalie Casey, Jonathan - Michael Jayston
9	5	Houseroom	29 January 2003	Jonathan - Michael Jayston, Eddie - James Greene
9	6	Coming Clean	5 February 2003	
10	1	The Real World	28 January 2004	
10	2	Rules Of Engagement	4 February 2004	Mrs Pinchbeck – Sheila Mitchell, the vicar – Richard Syms
10	3	Time With The Family	11 February 2004	Brian – James Vaughan, Kathryn – Bridget McConnel
10	4	A Bride Too Far	18 February 2004	
10	5	A Marriage Of Inconvenience	25 February 2004	
10	6	The Ring Cycle	3 March 2004	
11	1	Accentuate The Positive	19 January 2005	
11	2	Foreign Affairs	26 January 2005	
11	3	A Life More Ordinary	2 February 2005	Derek – Roland Davies
11	4	Hard Times	9 February 2005	Lydia Grucock – Richenda Carey, George – Bruce Alexander
11	5	Taking Chances	16 February 2005	Melissa – Judy Flynn
11	6	Ill Winds	23 February 2005	Melissa – Judy Flynn
12	1	Settling Down	26 April 2006	French voice – Marianne Borgo
12	2	Darling Daughters	3 May 2006	Jeff – Stephen Thorne
12	3	Misalliances	10 May 2006	Paddy – Bill Wallace
12	4	Upstaging	17 May 2006	Brian – James Vaughan, Kathryn – Bridget McConnel
12	5	Soft Soap	24 May 2006	Jeff – Stephen Thorne, Mr Darnley – Colin Starkey, George – Bruce Alexander, Felicity Titterill – Susan Jameson
12	6	Game, Set And Match	31 May 2006	French voice – Marianne Borgo
13	1	Age Differences	11 April 2007	Max – Jon Glover
13	2	Old School	18 April 2007	George – Bruce Alexander, Stranks, PW – Chris Emmett
13	3	Model Behaviour	25 April 2007	George – Bruce Alexander, Felicity – Susan Jameson, Moira – Joanna Monro
13	4	A Voice from the Past	2 May 2007	Brian – James Vaughan, Kathryn – Bridget McConnell, Patrick – Michael Simkins
13	5	Blue Rabbits	9 May 2007	Patrick – Michael Simkins
13	6	New Beginnings	16 May 2007	George – Bruce Alexander
