= A Shock to the System (1990 film) =

1990 film by Jan Egleson

- Theatrical release poster
- Directed by: Jan Egleson
- Screenplay by: Andrew Klavan
- Based on: A Shock to the System by Simon Brett
- Produced by: Patrick McCormick
- Starring: Michael Caine; Elizabeth McGovern; Peter Riegert; Swoosie Kurtz; Will Patton; Jenny Wright
- Cinematography: Paul Goldsmith
- Edited by: William M. Anderson; Peter C. Frank
- Music by: Gary Chang
- Production companies: Brigand Pictures; Corsair Pictures
- Distributed by: Corsair Pictures
- Release date: March 23, 1990
- Running time: 89 minutes
- Country: United States
- Language: English
- Budget: $10 million
- Box office: $3.4 million

A Shock to the System is a 1990 American black comedy film directed by Jan Egleson and starring Michael Caine, Swoosie Kurtz, Elizabeth McGovern, and Peter Riegert. It is based on the 1984 novel A Shock to the System by British author Simon Brett.

The film was released on March 23, 1990 and received generally positive reviews from critics.

== Plot ==
Graham Marshall, a long-time executive in a large advertising company, is unexpectedly passed over for promotion in favor of his obnoxious younger rival Bob Benham. While he sympathizes with his friend George Brewster, whose dismissal in the midst of a corporate takeover created the open position, Marshall is angry and disappointed. His greedy, self-absorbed wife Leslie is devastated and continually reproaches her husband for his apparent lack of ambition and willpower.

The night of the missed promotion, Graham is waiting for his train on the subway. An aggressive panhandler harasses him for being so rich and ungenerous. In a fit of rage, Graham pushes him hard enough that he falls on the subway tracks and gets run over by an oncoming train. Marshall is able to leave unobserved, which unexpectedly elates him.

Deciding to take revenge on the people who have made his life miserable, Marshall starts meticulously planning their deaths. Recalling an incident in which he was almost fatally electrocuted by faulty wiring in his basement, he arranges for Leslie to have a similar accident. After her death, he gets more ambitious and plans to get rid of Bob. First he rents a car using George's corporate account and procures a bottle of heavy downers from Joe, an office courier who deals drugs. While on a date with Stella Anderson, a female employee who is romantically interested in him, he spikes her drink with some of the downers and waits until she passes out. Driving the rental car to Bob's boat, he booby-traps it by tampering with a natural gas tank and taping some matches to the door. While returning home, he victoriously lights a cigar and absent-mindedly leaves his personalized gold plated lighter on the dashboard before returning the car to the dealer and going home. The next morning Stella wakes up as expected and assumes she blacked out after having slept with Graham. They spend the morning having sex to further cement Graham's alibi. Bob and one of his brown-nosing subordinates Henry Park board his boat; opening the door, they ignite the gas tank and blow themselves up. In the wake of Bob's death his boss, Mr. Jones, reaches out to Graham and offers him the promotion. He accepts it and, while discussing Bob's death, Jones casually mentions his interest in flying planes.

As Graham settles into his new position, life becomes increasingly hectic. Police Lieutenant Laker, assigned to all the deaths surrounding Graham, is quickly convinced of his guilt but lacks any evidence. Graham realizes his lighter has gone missing and slowly realizes that he must have left it in the rental car. Interviewed by Laker, Stella begins to suspect that Graham really is a killer. She retrieves the lighter from the car rental company and plans to meet Laker on the same subway platform where Graham earlier killed the panhandler. Graham finds her first and, during a tense confrontation, he appears to contemplate pushing her onto the tracks. However, after expressing her deep disappointment with him, Stella hands over the lighter and leaves without further incident. As Graham exits the subway station, he runs into Lt. Laker and victoriously lights a cigar with his retrieved lighter right in his face. Without evidence, Laker has no choice but to let Graham go. Meanwhile George, intensely depressed about his forced retirement, finds Graham's stash of downers and kills himself by taking the rest of them all at once, not realizing his knowledge of the car rental on his corporate account could have implicated Graham.

Graham revels in his newfound prestige and freedom, having eliminated all his enemies and gotten away with it, while ensuring Stella's silence by transferring her to Los Angeles. However, there is one more tiresome detail to deal with: Jones refuses to give up his corner office. As Graham continues to narrate, Jones's plane is seen flying over some tropical islands, before encountering sudden engine trouble. The movie ends with the sound of an explosion and Graham looking satisfied with himself.

== Difference from the novel ==
The movie plot differs somewhat from the novel. In the novel, Graham Marshall kills the panhandler by clobbering him to death with an umbrella and throwing his body off a bridge into a river below. Then when he tries to kill his wife Leslie, he begins with a failed attempt involving him awkwardly buying some poison from a garden centre after acting very suspicious and lacing a sherry bottle that Leslie drinks constantly from with it so she will drink it and die. However, it turns the sherry blue and it smells terrible and he knows there's no way she would ever drink it, so he abandons the idea and stashes the bottle in his shed. Then he kills Leslie the same way as the movie and kills his boss Bob Benham the same way as the movie (even though his brown-nosing subordinate Henry Park survives the explosion with only some scars on his face and then proceeds to brown-nose Graham once he gets the promotion). His missing lighter gets resolved differently by his old boss George Brewster getting it since the car was rented in his name. He gives it back to Graham without realizing how damning it could have been to the police and Graham silences him by pushing him in front of a subway train to make sure he never talks to anyone else about it.

Both the novel and movie end with Graham getting away with all of his killings. However, the novel then throws a final twist of irony at the end. There's a subplot featuring his mother-in-law, who is certain that Graham killed her daughter Leslie and is persistently trying to prove it. After Graham taunts her with the knowledge that he will never be prosecuted for it, he returns home from work one day to find Lt Laker preparing to arrest him. It turns out his mother-in-law found the poison laced sherry bottle in his shed and she drank it and made a big show in front of his neighbors about how he tricked her into drinking it before dropping dead in front of everybody. That combined with the garden centre employee testifying about how awkward he was when he bought the poison and a scorned Stella Anderson falsely testifying about the time Graham left his home, it looks very bad for Graham. After getting away with four murders, he is about to be arrested for a murder he did not commit.

== Cast ==
- Michael Caine as Graham Marshall
- Elizabeth McGovern as Stella Anderson
- Peter Riegert as Bob Benham
- Swoosie Kurtz as Leslie Marshall
- Will Patton as Lt. Laker
- Jenny Wright as Melanie O'Conner
- John McMartin as George Brewster
- Barbara Baxley as Lillian
- Haviland Morris as Tara Liston
- Philip Moon as Henry Park
- Kent Broadhurst as Executive #1
- Zach Grenier as Executive #2
- David Schramm as Executive #3
- Sam Schacht as David Jones
- Christopher Durang as Speaker
- Mia Dillon as Secretary
- Darrell Wilks as Joe
- Mike Cicchetti as Beggar
- Mike Starr as Bum
- Miguel Perez as Transit Cop
- John Finn as Motorman
- Samuel L. Jackson as Ulysses
- Jonathan Freeman as Decorator
- Socorro Santiago as Renal Car Attendant

== Production ==
The film was shot in New York City between May 22 and July 28, 1989, on a $10 million budget. Scenes were shot at, Wall Street Plaza and Grand Central Terminal. The sailboat scenes were filmed on Lake Montauk. The beginning of the film was filmed in Connecticut including Rowayton station.

According to Corsair Pictures executive Frank Perry, the screenplay originally ended with the character of Graham Marshall (Michael Caine) being killed off but was rewritten because of Caine's performance. A satisfactory ending to the film was not written until the fifth week of filming. The director Jan Egleson ultimately shot three different endings to the film, with the final version not being selected until editing during post-production.

== Reception ==
On Rotten Tomatoes, the film holds an approval rating of 71% based on 34 reviews, with an average rating of 6.7/10. The website's critics consensus reads: "Aided by Michael Caine's finely layered performance, A Shock to the System finds dark comedy in the cutthroat modern business world." On Metacritic, the film has a weighted average score of 69 out of 100 based on 19 critics, indicating "generally favorable" reviews.

Roger Ebert gave the film 3 out of 4 stars, writing: "A Shock to the System confounds our expectations and keeps us intrigued, because there's no way to know, not even in the very last moments, exactly which way the plot is going to fall."

Stanley Kauffmann of The New Republic wrote about A Shock to the System "the plot has a couple of holes in it but Caine breezes along as if it didn't. The most notable fact about the picture is that the protagonist is an egocentric murderer (perhaps the adjective is superfluous), with no jot of sympathy in him; yet a considerable star accepted the role. That in itself is a small sociocultural marker. What's even more remarkable is that Caine's believe ability—not by tugging at our hearts—is able to make us hope that he succeeds with his wickedness.

== See also ==
- Helen Zahavi's novel Dirty Weekend (1991) for a story with a similar subject matter.
