= The Philosophical Forum =

- Discipline: Philosophy
- Language: English
- Edited by: Alexus McLeod

Publication details
- History: 1943–1964, 1968–present
- Publisher: Wiley-Blackwell (United States)
- Frequency: Quarterly

Standard abbreviations
- ISO 4: Philos. Forum

Indexing
- ISSN: 0031-806X (print); 1467-9191 (web)
- LCCN: 73644158
- OCLC no.: 863263119

Links
- Journal homepage; Online access; Online archive; Ingentaconnect archive

The Philosophical Forum is a philosophy journal published by Wiley-Blackwell. It is currently edited by Alexus McLeod.

== History ==
The Philosophical Forum was founded in 1943 as an annual philosophy journal, published by the Boston University Philosophical Club. The first editor was Sheldon C. Ackley. The first issue contained articles by Edgar S. Brightman, David Easton, Robert Whitaker, and William E. Kerstetter. The journal continued to publish more or less annually until 1964. In its run it contained articles by many philosophers including Paul Arthur Schilpp, Hugo Adam Bedau, Brand Blanshard, Abraham Edel, and Gordon W. Allport.

The Philosophical Forum was reconstituted in 1968 under the editorship of Joseph Agassi. It was published quarterly by Boston University's department of philosophy. The first issue contained articles by Charles Hartshorne, Sylvain Bromberger, and Yehuda Elkana's translation of an article by Ludwig Boltzmann. After two issues, Walter G. Emge took over as editor. He held the position for two issues until Marx Wartofsky took over editorship and reconstituted the Journal. When Wartofsky moved from Boston University to Baruch College The Philosophical Forum moved with him. Marx Wartofsky edited The Philosophical Forum until his death. William James Earle and then Douglas P. Lackey, both of Baruch College's Philosophy department, edited the Forum after Wartofsky's death. In 2022, Alexus McLeod, of Indiana University, took over as editor the Forum, with the aim of expanding the international scope and methodological breadth of the journal.

== Content ==
The Philosophical Forum has been consistently publishing articles by prominent philosophers. The journal's approach to philosophy is rare. Marx Wartofsky had an extremely broad conception of philosophy that included philosophy of science, political philosophy, and aesthetics and many other branches of philosophy, from both sides of the philosophical spectrum, including analytic philosophy and continental philosophy. The Philosophical Forum continues to publish articles from many different philosophical traditions. The Forum is currently developing its international scope, with its aim "bridging the gap between philosophy in the West (both analytic and continental) and the philosophical traditions of the rest of the world. The Philosophical Forum aims to be a true global philosophical meeting place, featuring innovative work within and between philosophical traditions."

The Philosophical Forum often publishes single-topic issues. Notably it has released issues on philosophy and economics, sociobiology, apartheid, African-American philosophical traditions, race and ethnicity, the philosophy of Jerry Katz, translations of philosophical poetry, ethics and architecture, and translations of French philosophy of science. Future single-topic issues include issues on global philosophical traditions such as African Philosophy, Islamic Philosophy, Chinese Philosophy, and others.

== See also ==
- List of philosophy journals
