= Juliet Mitchell =

British psychoanalyst and author

Juliet Mitchell FBA
- Born: 1940 (age 85–86); Christchurch, New Zealand

Academic background
- Education: St Anne's College, Oxford (BA)

Academic work
- Institutions: Psychoanalysis Unit of University College London
- Main interests: Psychoanalysis; gender studies; English literature; socialist feminism
- Notable works: Psychoanalysis and Feminism: Freud, Reich, Laing and Women (1974)
- Website: julietmitchell.co.uk

Juliet Mitchell, Lady Goody FBA is a British psychoanalyst, socialist feminist, research professor and author.

== Early life and education ==
Juliet Mitchell was born in Christchurch, New Zealand, and moved to England in 1944, staying with her grandparents in the Midlands. She attended St Anne's College, Oxford, where she received a degree in English in 1962, as well as doing postgraduate work. She taught English literature from 1962 to 1970 at Leeds University and Reading University. Throughout the 1960s, Mitchell was active in leftist politics, and was on the editorial committee of the journal New Left Review.

== Career ==
=== "Women: The Longest Revolution" ===
Mitchell's article "Women: The Longest Revolution", in New Left Review (1966), was an original synthesis of Simone de Beauvoir, Frederich Engels, Viola Klein, Betty Friedan and other analysts of women's oppression.

=== The Cambridge University Centre for Gender Studies ===
Mitchell is a fellow professor of Psychoanalysis at Jesus College, Cambridge, and founded the Centre for Gender Studies at Cambridge University. In 2010, she was appointed director of the Expanded Doctoral School in Psychoanalytic Studies at the Psychoanalysis Unit of University College London (UCL).

=== Psychoanalysis and Feminism ===
Mitchell is best known for her book Psychoanalysis and Feminism: Freud, Reich, Laing and Women (1974), in which she tried to reconcile psychoanalysis and feminism at a time when many considered them incompatible. Peter Gay considered it "the most rewarding and responsible contribution" to the feminist debate on Freud, both acknowledging and rising beyond Freud's male chauvinism in its analysis. Mitchell saw Freud's asymmetrical view of masculinity and femininity as reflecting the realities of patriarchal culture, and sought to use his critique of femininity to critique patriarchy itself.

By insisting on the utility of Freud (particularly in a Lacanian reading) for feminism, she opened the way for further critical work on psychoanalysis and gender. She was an Andrew Dickson White Professor-at-Large at Cornell University from 1993 to 1999.

== Bibliography ==
=== Monographs ===
- Woman's Estate. Harmondsworth: Penguin. 1971. ISBN 9780140214253.
- Psychoanalysis and Feminism: Freud, Reich, Laing, and Women. New York: Pantheon Books. 1974. ISBN 9780394474724.

Reissued as: Psychoanalysis and Feminism: A radical reassessment of Freudian psychoanalysis. New York: Basic Books. 2000. ISBN 9780465046089.

- Women, the Longest Revolution. New York: Pantheon Books. 1984. ISBN 9780394725741.
- Mad Men and Medusas: Reclaiming Hysteria. New York: Basic Books. 2000. ISBN 9780465046133.
- Siblings: Sex and Violence. Cambridge, UK / Malden, Massachusetts: Polity Press. 2003. ISBN 9780745632216.
- Fratriarchy, The Sibling Trauma and the Law of the Mother. London: Routledge. 2023. ISBN 9781032364407.

=== Edited books ===
- Mitchell, Juliet; Oakley, Ann (1976). The Rights and Wrongs of Women. Harmondsworth / New York: Penguin. ISBN 9780140216165.
- Mitchell, Juliet; Lacan, Jacques; Rose, Jacqueline (1985). Feminine Sexuality: Jacques Lacan and the école freudienne. New York / London: Pantheon Books / W. W. Norton. ISBN 9780393302110.
- Mitchell, Juliet; Oakley, Ann (1986). What is Feminism?. Oxford, UK: Basil Blackwell. ISBN 9780631148432.
- Mitchell, Juliet; Melanie Klein (1987). The Selected Melanie Klein. New York: Free Press. ISBN 9780029214817.
- Mitchell, Juliet; Louise Bourgeois (2016). Louise Bourgeois: Autobiographical Prints. London: Hayward Gallery Publishing. ISBN 978-1853323430.
- Mitchell, Juliet; Larratt-Smith, Philip (2021). Louise Bourgeois, Freud's Daughter. New Haven: Yale University Press. ISBN 9780300247244.

== See also ==
- Nancy Chodorow
- Kate Millett
