= The Sociology of Housework =

Non-fiction book by Ann Oakley

- Cover of 1975 edition
- Author: Ann Oakley
- Language: English
- Subject: Women and housework
- Genre: Non-fiction
- Publication date: 1974
- Publication place: England

The Sociology of Housework is a 1974 non-fiction book by Ann Oakley that contains her research from the 1960s about women and housework. Oakley interviewed 40 housewives from London about how they felt about housework.

== Background ==
The book is a compilation of research that Oakley completed in the 1960s. Previously, sociologists did not think of housework as actual work, and there were very few professional studies of women's work inside the home.

Oakley's book was the first piece of sociological research that showed housework as being actual work. It examined the conditions in which women carried out housework and how each woman experienced the work. The research was published in two books: Housewife and The Sociology of Housework. The Sociology of Housework focused on sexism within sociology and the analysis of the women whom she interviewed. Oakley interviewed 40 housewives from London and found that the interviewees "value the autonomy of housework", but that they did not like most of the tasks. Twenty-eight of the women were not satisfied with housework and the interviews showed that the widespread assumption that only middle-class women were unhappy with doing the housework might not be true.

Oakley noticed that working-class women were more likely to say that they were happy with being a housewife as a job, but attributed this to these women wanting to conform to what was normally socially acceptable. She also found that both working-class and middle-class women could "find their work monotonous, lonely, and interminable". Most of the women received barely any help from their husbands with housework or childcare. The majority of women also felt that it was "unquestionably their duty to do the domestic work" due to them identifying "personally with their role and the gender stereotypes that go with it".

== Reception ==
In a 1975 review in the journal The Sociological Review, Jennifer Hurstfield wrote, "Of the two books, Housewife is, I think, the more successful. It is clearly and incisively written." Joann Vanek wrote in a 1976 review in the American Journal of Sociology that "Oakley's findings on housework patterns are generally supported by time-use research. However, the contribution of the study lies less in this than in what it tells about the meaning of work, about the perceptions and attitudes housewives have about their job". Judith A. Hammond wrote in a 1977 review in the journal Social Forces that "[Oakley's] discussion is equally sexist, however, and emphasizes only the negative aspects of housewifery".
