= Ann Oakley =

British sociologist, feminist, and writer

Ann Rosamund Oakley
- Born: Ann Rosamund Titmuss; 17 January 1944 (age 82)
- Education: Somerville College, Oxford; Bedford College, University of London
- Occupations: Professor and Founder-Director of the Social Science Research Unit at University College London
- Relatives: Professor Richard Titmuss (father)
- Writing career
- Genres: Non-fiction Sociology and Fiction (novelist)
- Subjects: Sociology and Gender
- Notable works: The Men's Room (adapted for BBC television); The Sociology of Housework

Ann Rosamund Oakley (née Titmuss; born 17 January 1944) is a British sociologist and writer. She is Professor of Sociology and Social Policy, and founder-director of the Social Science Research Unit and the EPPI Centre at the Social Research Institute at University College London. She is also an Honorary Fellow at Somerville College, Oxford.

== Biography ==
Oakley is the only child of Professor Richard Titmuss and wrote a biography of her parents as well as editing some of his works for re-publication. Her mother Kathleen, née Miller, was a social worker.

Ann Oakley was born in London in 1944. She was educated at Haberdashers' Aske's School for Girls, Chiswick Polytechnic and Somerville College, Oxford University taking her Bachelor of Arts in 1965, having married fellow future academic Robin Oakley the previous year. In the next few years Ann Oakley worked as a researcher and wrote fiction and scripts for children's television. Returning to formal education at Bedford College, University of London, she gained a PhD in 1974 with a thesis on women's attitudes to housework, from which several of her early books were derived. Much of her early sociological research focused on gender and women's health.

In 1985, Oakley moved to work at the Institute of Education in London where she set up the Social Science Research Unit (SSRU) in 1990, and the Evidence for Policy and Practice Information Centre (EPPI Centre) in 1993.

In the Spring of 1997, Oakley was a Fellow at the Swedish Collegium for Advanced Study in Uppsala, Sweden.

Ann Oakley has written numerous academic works, of which the best known include Sex, Gender and Society (1972), Housewife (1974), The Sociology of Housework (1974), Becoming a Mother (1980), Experiments in Knowing (2000), Gender on Planet Earth (2002), and Women, Peace and Welfare (2019). She has also written a number of novels, of which the best known is The Men's Room, which was adapted by Laura Lamson for BBC television in 1991, and which starred Harriet Walter and Bill Nighy. She also wrote an early partial autobiography, Taking it Like a Woman (1984). Her biographical work includes a study of the life and work of the social scientist and life peer, Barbara Wootton, along with two books focusing on the lives of her parents. She has also made important contributions to debates about sociological research methods.

== Main Publications ==
=== Non-fiction ===
- Oakley, Ann (1972). Sex, gender and society. London: Temple Smith. ISBN 0851170218.
- Oakley, Ann (1974). Housewife. London: Allen Lane. ISBN 978-0713909326. (published in America under title 'Women's Work')
- Oakley, Ann (1974). The Sociology of Housework. Oxford: Basil Blackwell. ISBN 9780394730882.
- Oakley, Ann; Mitchell, Juliet (1976). The rights and wrongs of women. Harmondsworth: Penguin. ISBN 9780393302110.
- Oakley, Ann (1980). Becoming a mother. Oxford: Martin Robertson. ISBN 9780855202064. (Penguin paperback edition published under title 'From Here to Maternity')
- Oakley, Ann (1980). Women confined: towards a sociology of childbirth. Oxford: Martin Robertson. ISBN 9780855202118.
- Oakley, Ann (1981). Subject women. Oxford: Martin Robertson. ISBN 9780855203474.
- Oakley, Ann (1984). The captured womb: a history of the medical care of pregnant women. Oxford: Basil Blackwell. ISBN 9780631141525.
- Oakley, Ann (1984). Taking it like a woman. London: Jonathan Cape. ISBN 9780224021180.
- Oakley, Ann; Mitchell, Juliet (1986). What is feminism?. Oxford: Basil Blackwell. ISBN 9780140216165.
- Oakley, Ann (1986). Telling the truth about Jerusalem: a collection of essays and poems. Oxford: Basil Blackwell. ISBN 9780631147732.
- Oakley, Ann (1992). Social support and motherhood: the natural history of a research project. Oxford: Blackwell. ISBN 9780631182740.
- Oakley, Ann (1993). Essays on women, medicine and health. Edinburgh: Edinburgh University Press. ISBN 9780748604500.
- Oakley, Ann; Williams, A. Susan, eds. (1994). The politics of the welfare state. London: UCL Press. ISBN 9781857282061.
- Oakley, Ann (1996). Man and wife: Richard and Kay Titmuss: my parents' early years. London: Harper Collins. ISBN 9780002556651.
- Oakley, Ann; Mitchell, Juliet (1997). Who's afraid of feminism?: seeing through the backlash. London: Hamish Hamilton. ISBN 9780241136232.
- Oakley, Ann (2000). Experiments in knowing: gender and method in the social sciences. Cambridge: Polity Press. ISBN 9780745622576.
- Oakley, Ann (2002). Gender on planet Earth. Cambridge: Polity Press. ISBN 9780745629643.
- Oakley, Ann (2007). Fracture: adventures of a broken body. Bristol: Policy Press. ISBN 9781861349378.
- Oakley, Ann (2011). A critical woman: Barbara Wootton, social science and public policy in the twentieth century. London: Bloomsbury Academic. ISBN 9781849664684.
- Oakley, Ann (2014). Father and Daughter: Patriarchy, gender and social science. Bristol: Policy Press. ISBN 9781447318101.
- Oakley, Ann (2019). Women, Peace and Welfare: A suppressed history of social reform, 1880-1920. Bristol: Policy Press. ISBN 9781447332626.
- Oakley, Ann (2021). Forgotten Wives: How women get written out of history. Bristol: Policy Press. ISBN 9781447355847.
- Oakley, Ann (2024). The Science of Housework: Homes and health, 1880-1940. Bristol: Policy Press. ISBN 9781447369622.

=== Fiction ===
- Oakley, Ann (1988). The men's room. London: Harper Collins. ISBN 9780860688853.
- Clay, Rosamund [nom de plume of Oakley] (1990). Only angels forget. London: Virago. ISBN 9781853811272.
- Oakley, Ann (1990). Matilda's mistake. London: Virago. ISBN 9781853812118.
- Oakley, Ann (1993). The secret lives of Eleanor Jenkinson. London: Harper Collins. ISBN 9780002239448.
- Oakley, Ann (1993). Scenes originating in the Garden of Eden. London: Harper Collins. ISBN 9780002243032.
- Oakley, Ann (1996). A proper holiday. London: Flamingo. ISBN 9780006550143.
- Oakley, Ann (1999). Overheads. London: Harper Collins. ISBN 9780002257916.
- Oakley, Ann (2022). The Strange Lockdown Life of Alice Henry. London: Linen Press. ISBN 9781919624846.
