= Cultural artifact =

Social scientific term

A cultural artifact, or cultural artefact (see American and British English spelling differences), is a term used in the social sciences, particularly anthropology, ethnology and sociology for anything created by humans which gives information about the culture of its creator and users. Artifact is the spelling in North American English; artefact is usually preferred elsewhere.

Cultural artifact is a more generic term and should be considered with two words of similar, but narrower, nuance: it can include objects recovered from archaeological sites, i.e. archaeological artifacts, but can also include objects of modern or early-modern society, or social artifacts. For example, in an anthropological context, a 17th-century lathe, a piece of faience, or a television each provides a wealth of information about the time in which it were manufactured and used.

Cultural artifacts, whether ancient or current, have significance because they offer insight into technological processes, economic development and social structure, among other attributes.

== Classification ==
The philosopher Marx W. Wartofsky categorized artifacts as follows:

- primary artifacts: used in production (such as a hammer, a fork, a lamp, or a camera);
- secondary artifacts: relating to primary artifacts (such as a user manual for a camera);
- tertiary artifacts: representations of secondary artifacts (such as a picture of a user manual for a camera).

Social artifacts, unlike archaeological artifacts, do not need to have a physical form (for example virtual artifact), nor to be of historical value (items created seconds ago can be classified as social artifacts).
