= Marx W. Wartofsky =

American philosopher

- Born: 1928; United States
- Died: March 1997 (aged 68–69); Manhattan, New York City, New York, United States

Philosophical work
- Era: Contemporary philosophy
- Region: Western philosophy
- School: Continental philosophy
- Notable students: Elmer Fung
- Main interests: Epistemology
- Notable ideas: Categorization of artifacts

Marx W. Wartofsky (1928–1997) was an American philosopher, specialising in historical epistemology. He was a professor of philosophy at Baruch College and the Graduate Center of the City University of New York and the editor of The Philosophical Forum. With Robert S. Cohen, he co-founded the Boston University Center for Philosophy and History of Science, in 1960.

His works include Feuerbach (Cambridge University Press, 1977), a philosophical and historical critique of German philosopher and moralist Ludwig Andreas Feuerbach; Conceptual Foundations of Scientific Thought (Macmillan, 1968) and Models: Representation and Scientific Understanding (1979), inquiries into the meaning of scientific models and metaphors.
