= A Shock to the System (novel) =

1984 black comedy novel by Simon Brett

- First edition (publ. Macmillan)
- Author: Simon Brett
- Language: English
- Publisher: Macmillan
- Publication date: 1984

A Shock to the System is a 1984 black comedy novel by Simon Brett. The novel was adapted into the 1990 film of the same name starring Michael Caine.

== Plot ==
Graham Marshall, the protagonist, is a rising executive at a London based oil conglomerate, and has always played by the rules. Graham is passed over for promotion, losing out to a younger colleague called Robert Benham. On his way home that night, he lashes out at an aged tramp who harasses him, killing him, and dumps the body in the Thames. When it becomes clear that he has got away with this murder, Graham begins to feel a new power and murders his wife by booby-trapping an electric switch. Next, he sets a boating booby-trap for Robert, and fakes a suicide to dispose of a possible witness. Eventually he gets arrested for a murder he did not commit, as a consequence of a revenge-plot of his mother-in-law.

== Critical reception ==
One review considered this ending to be "awfully contrived" but the novel was described as "extra-dry in its humor" and "ever so restrained in its melodrama".
