= A Charles Paris Mystery =

Series of detective novels by Simon Brett

Charles Paris
- A Charles Paris Mystery character
- First appearance: Cast, In Order of Disappearance
- Created by: Simon Brett
- Portrayed by: Francis Matthews; Bill Nighy

In-universe information
- Gender: Male
- Occupation: Actor, amateur sleuth
- Nationality: British

A Charles Paris Mystery is a series of detective novels by Simon Brett, about actor Charles Paris, who solves murders he encounters in his theatrical and film jobs.

The novels have been adapted by Jeremy Front into a comedy-drama series for BBC Radio, starring Bill Nighy.

Brett was inspired to write the Charles Paris series after working on the BBC radio adaptations of Lord Peter Wimsey: "I realised that plot is really important but character and dialogue were actually just as important."

== Character ==
Charles Paris is an unhappily separated (but not divorced, more than 30 years on), moderately successful character actor (Note: In Not Dead, Only Resting (Chapter Seven), Charles Paris is categorized as a character actor by the Spotlight directory.) with a slight drinking problem who gets entangled in various crimes, and finds himself unwillingly in the role of amateur detective.

Bill Nighy describes Paris as "an actor sleuth, who drinks too much and smokes too much and doesn't work very much. But every time he does go to work, somebody gets murdered."

== Reception ==
The radio adaptations have been described by The Guardian as "languid, restful fun", and by The Times as "always a treat... Paris is an ingenious confection... The joy for listeners comes from how Nighy makes almost tangible every observation in Front’s pithy script."

A review of So Much Blood (2023) in The Daily Telegraph described the series as cozy crime, and wrote "The first reason to tune in is that Charles Paris is Bill Nighy... It's the role he was born to play." The reviewer also praised Suzanne Burden's comic timing.

== Novels ==
1. Cast, In Order of Disappearance (1975)
2. So Much Blood (1976)
3. Star Trap (1977)
4. An Amateur Corpse (1978)
5. A Comedian Dies (1979)
6. The Dead Side of the Mic (1980)
7. Situation Tragedy (1981)
8. Murder Unprompted (1982)
9. Murder in the Title (1983)
10. Not Dead, Only Resting (1984)
11. Dead Giveaway (1985)
12. What Bloody Man Is That? (1987)
13. A Series of Murders (1989)
14. Corporate Bodies (1991)
15. A Reconstructed Corpse (1993)
16. Sicken and So Die (1995)
17. Dead Room Farce (1998)
18. A Decent Interval (2013)
19. The Cinderella Killer (2014)
20. A Deadly Habit (2018)

== Adaptations ==
Cast, In Order of Disappearance (June 1984) and So Much Blood (August 1985) were both adapted by Simon Brett as serials for BBC Radio 2 with Francis Matthews in the lead role.

Bill Nighy has played Paris in a series of BBC Radio productions. The first, an adaptation of So Much Blood for The Saturday Play in 1999, was dramatised by Bert Coules. It was recorded on location at its Edinburgh Fringe setting. A Series of Murders followed as another Saturday Play in 2004, adapted by Jeremy Front. Since then, they have been adapted by Jeremy Front into a number of four-episode half-hour serials. As of 2025, there have been 16 series. These serials have all been updated to the present day, and adapted to deal with continuity problems caused by the adaptations being made out of order in relation to the books, with later adaptations featuring more far-reaching changes to the central mysteries.

Recurring cast members include Jon Glover as Charles's agent Maurice, and Suzanne Burden as Frances, his estranged ("semi-detached") wife and landlord.

On 29 October 2026, Bill Nighy announced on his podcast, "Ill-advised by Bill Nighy", that the Charles Paris series would return in November 2026 with a new series.

Stating: "(...)It's one of the most successful Radio 4 productions ever and one of the longest-running (...)"

The four new episodes titled "Dead Giveaway" will be available on BBC Sounds from the 2nd of November and will see the usual cast reprising their roles. Dead Giveaway is written by Jeremy Front, based on the novel by Simon Brett.

=== List of radio adaptations with Bill Nighy as Charles ===
Saturday plays

- So Much Blood (recorded on location at Edinburgh Fringe), 1999. (Bert Coules adaptation)
- A Series of Murders, 2004

4-part half-hour serials

- Sicken and So Die, 2006
- Murder Unprompted, 2007
- The Dead Side of the Mic, 2008
- Cast in Order of Disappearance, began 29 January 2010
- Murder in the Title, began 22 November 2010
- A Reconstructed Corpse, March 2012
- An Amateur Corpse, began 5 December 2012
- Corporate Bodies, began 25 June 2014
- A Decent Interval, 9–30 March 2016
- The Cinderella Killer, began 2 December 2016
- Dead Room Farce, 23 February to 16 March 2018
- Star Trap, 6 March 2019
- A Doubtful Death, 22 May to 12 June 2020
- A Deadly Habit, 3 to 24 September 2021
- So Much Blood, June 2023 (Jeremy Front adaptation)
- Situation Tragedy, January 2025
- Dead Giveaway, November 2026
