= Darkside (radio play) =

2013 radio drama

- Darkside CD cover
- Written by: Tom Stoppard
- Original language: English

Premiere
- Date premiered: 26 August 2013

Darkside is a 2013 philosophical comedy radio drama written by Tom Stoppard, produced and directed by James Robinson and based on the themes of Pink Floyd's 1973 progressive rock album The Dark Side of the Moon.

== Cast ==
- Amaka Okafor as Emily McCoy
- Iwan Rheon as The Boy
- Bill Nighy as Doctor Antrobus / The Witch Finder
- Rufus Sewell as Mr Baggott / Ethics Man
- Adrian Scarborough as Fat Man
- Peter Marinker as The Wise One
- Robert Blythe as Banker
- Ben Crowe as Politician
- Philippa Stanton as Emily's Mother

== Production ==
Stoppard was first approached with the idea of writing a play based on the album in 1973, but had "no idea" how to approach it until much later. BBC's radio drama producer James Robinson said that the initial idea was "to see what sort of a journey the album takes Tom Stoppard on". Stoppard used all of the album, apart from lyrics, as "a kind of underscore", taking emotional cues from the music. He contacted Pink Floyd's David Gilmour, who gave Stoppard permission to write dialogue that would be heard over the instrumental pieces, and found the resulting script "fascinating". On adapting the album, Stoppard stated: "I didn't try to make a story that was the album writ large in any way. I invented a little story in the spirit of the album, taking a cue as to what level of reality this story might be on."

== Themes ==
The following philosophical themes are present in the play:

- The trolley problem, a traditional thought experiment
- The tragedy of the commons
- Utilitarianism
  - Utilitarian consequentialism
- Nietzscheanism
  - Nietzschean egoism
- Kantianism
- Hobbesianism
- The prisoner's dilemma, a traditional example analyzed in game theory

== Marketing ==
Aardman Animations created a three-minute short film to promote the play, consisting of a montage depicting a world on the verge of collapse, with huge ploughs destroying landscapes and skies filled with warplanes. The short was directed by Darren Dubicki, and was intended to evoke themes of "greed, conflict and consumption" with the eventual message that "Life is futile, and destined to descend into madness." The animators drew inspiration from the surreal album artwork by Storm Thorgerson and Hipgnosis.

== Broadcast ==
The play was broadcast on BBC Radio 2 on 26 August 2013, the year of the album's 40th anniversary. It was preceded by a number of programmes to complement the event. During the broadcast, Aardman Animations' short film was played in a loop on the BBC Radio 2 website, BBC Big Screens and several third-party sites. The first online review of the play was by Robin Hilton. The play is now available on Deezer and Spotify.
