= The Men's Room =

British television drama mini-series

- Genre: Drama; Black comedy
- Based on: The Men's Room by Ann Oakley
- Directed by: Antonia Bird
- Starring: Bill Nighy; Harriet Walter; Amanda Redman; Charlotte Cornwell; James Aubrey
- Composers: Sarah Jane Morris; Andy Roberts
- Country of origin: United Kingdom
- Original language: English
- No. of series: 1
- No. of episodes: 5

Production
- Producer: David Snodin
- Running time: 50 minutes

Original release
- Network: BBC2
- Release: 25 September – 23 October 1991

The Men's Room is a British television drama that was produced by the BBC and originally aired on BBC2 from 25 September to 23 October 1991. The series, which comprises five 50-minute episodes, was adapted by Laura Lamson from Ann Oakley's 1989 novel of the same name, and stars Bill Nighy, Harriet Walter, Amanda Redman, Charlotte Cornwell and James Aubrey.

A black comedy and period piece set during the Thatcher years, it tells the story of an affair between two academics: a previously devoted wife and mother, Charity Walton (Walter), and a serial womaniser, Mark Carleton (Nighy).

Nighy credits the series as being his breakthrough role.

== Cast ==
- Bill Nighy as Prof. Mark Carleton
- Harriet Walter as Charity Walton
- Patrick Drury as James Walton
- Mel Martin as Jane Carleton
- Amanda Redman as Sally
- Charlotte Cornwell as Margaret Lacey
- James Aubrey as Steve Kirkwood
- Bill Stewart as Doctor Ivan Swinhoe
- Cheryl Hall as Mavis McDonald
- David Ryall as Alan Pascoe
- Kate Hardie as Tessa Pascoe
- Tilly Vosburgh as Delia
- Philip Croskin as Mack MacKinnon

== Home media release ==
The series was released on DVD in 2013.
