= Dry drunk =

Former alcoholic who retains patterns of addiction

Dry drunk is an expression coined by the founder of Alcoholics Anonymous that describes an alcoholic who no longer drinks but otherwise maintains the same behavior patterns of an alcoholic.

== Description ==
A dry drunk can be described as a person who refrains from alcohol or drugs but still has all the unresolved emotional and psychological issues which might have fueled the addiction to begin with. These unresolved issues continue to have a hold on their psyche and hence, while they do not seek intoxication, they exhibit many of the other behavioural traits associated with addiction. In most cases, alcohol dependency is a substantial factor in the lives of the alcoholics and accepting sobriety comes with its own challenges and understanding of their personality. Despite leaving alcohol and de-addicting themselves, most of their personalities are an embodiment of their previous selves.

The dry drunk is portrayed with feelings of profound depression and frustration and with the indecisive feeling of wanting a drink that they have given up. Many alcoholics drink for long periods before maintaining sobriety for a period and become accustomed to the personality and character traits that are embodied by their behavior during addiction. During this phase of "dry drunk", the addicts face restlessness, frustration, anger, impatience and cravings. The symptoms of dry drunkenness are irregular and in some individuals can be less intense while others remain unchanged as the period of sobriety increases. Some of the symptoms of dry drunkenness can be noticed in the initial phase of sobriety, while others can manifest themselves later as some addicts work to suppress their dry drunk emotions. These patterns of behavior can be treated and alleviated through professional assistance.

== See also ==
- Anhedonia
- Alcoholism
- High functioning depression
- Naltrexone
- Substance abuse
