= Hitler's SS: Portrait in Evil =

1985 American television film

- Genre: Drama; War
- Written by: Lukas Heller
- Directed by: Jim Goddard
- Starring: Carroll Baker; Paul Brooke; Warren Clarke; Michael Elphick; José Ferrer; Lucy Gutteridge; Colin Jeavons; Stratford Johns; Derek Newark; Bill Nighy; John Normington; Tony Randall; John Shea; Robert Urquhart; David Warner
- Theme music composer: Richard Hartley
- Country of origin: United States
- Original language: English

Production
- Executive producer: Edgar J. Scherick
- Producer: Aida Young
- Cinematography: Ernest Vincze
- Editor: John Shirley
- Running time: 135 min.
- Production companies: Edgar J. Scherick Associates; Metromedia Producers Corporation

Original release
- Network: NBC
- Release: February 17, 1985

Hitler's SS: Portrait in Evil is a 1985 American made-for-television war drama film about two German brothers, Helmut and Karl Hoffmann, and the paths they take during the Nazi regime. The movie was directed by Jim Goddard and starred John Shea, Bill Nighy, Tony Randall, David Warner and John Woodnutt. The film shows Karl, who was originally enthusiastic about the Nazi Party, becoming disillusioned and Helmut, who was at first wary of the Nazi Party, joining the Schutzstaffel (SS) and later being an accomplice to war crimes.

== Plot ==
Helmut and Karl Hoffman are two brothers who grow up in the Great Depression of the Weimar Republic, witness the coming to power of the Nazi Party and the establishment of the Third Reich. Karl, an unemployed mechanic, is enthusiastic about the Nazis and joins the Sturmabteilung (SA), the Nazi Party militia, after hearing its commander, Ernst Röhm, speak at a Nazi Party rally. Helmut is reluctant and thinks the Nazis are simply another political party.

Helmut, who is a university student in Munich, is eventually talked into joining the Schutzstaffel, by Reinhard Heydrich in particular, after witnessing a meeting in the Ruhr between Adolf Hitler, Kurt Baron von Schröder, Emil Kirdorf, and other German industrialists. Helmut is commissioned an SS officer in the Sicherheitsdienst (SD), the intelligence agency of the SS, right before Hitler comes to power, whereas Karl has already been an SA member for a year. Karl is distressed due to tensions between the SA and the SS and claims that the SS is trying to make it look like the SA is the "party’s garbage collector".

The entire first half of the film leads up to the Night of the Long Knives. The liquidation of the SA leadership, old enemies and the shooting of Röhm then transpire. During this time, Karl is arrested and sent to Dachau. Using his connections within the SS, Helmut gets Karl freed but Heydrich cautions that Karl had better behave himself or else Helmut would find himself "running short of friends."

The next five years preceding World War II are treated hurriedly. The film pays homage to Kristallnacht only in a brief scene, and then the film skips to Helmut personally being involved with the selection of prisoners to murder for the Gleiwitz incident. During the war itself, the film portrays Helmut becoming involved in the paperwork of the Holocaust. Karl meanwhile becomes an anti-Nazi, is drafted in the Wehrmacht, and becomes an officer on the Eastern Front.

Helmut becomes an SS-Oberführer, but is extremely disillusioned with the SS and the Nazi Party by the end of the film. Karl deserts from the army around the time of the assassination attempt against Hitler on 20 July and wanders Germany, observing the war torn rubble of German cities. In late April 1945, Helmut deserts from the SS, but is killed by an SS patrol while trying to flee Berlin. The film ends with Karl and his lover Mitzie Templer standing in the ruins of Stuttgart, after learning his parents, Albrecht and Gerda, and little brother Hans—who fought with the Hitler Youth during the battle of Berlin—are all dead.

== Character profiles ==
As the film takes place over a span of thirteen years (1932–1945), the main characters of Helmut and Karl are shown to join the SA, SS, and the army with various career paths. A supporting character Becker is first introduced in the year 1933 as a member of the SS Leibstandarte Adolf Hitler and a friend of Helmut, and rises to the rank of lieutenant colonel in the Waffen-SS by the end of the film in 1945. Unlike Helmut, however, he shows no remorse or regret for the actions he was involved in.

The actors, most of whom who were in their 30s when the film was produced, are depicted to be between the ages of 20 and 22 when the film begins. To offset the effect that the actors themselves do not age a decade throughout the film, make-up and costuming is used in the first part of the film to portray the characters in their younger days.

=== Karl Hoffmann ===
played by John Shea

Karl begins the film in 1931 as an unemployed mechanic between 18 and 20 years old. It is stated that Karl has a high school education from the Realschule and, during his youth, was a serious soccer player. Karl is quick to join the Nazi Party in the fall of 1931, drawn by the appeals of a better life for the German working class. At the same time, Karl joins the Sturmabteilung (SA) as a rank and file stormtrooper.

Karl is shown to be a part-time member of a local SA unit in Stuttgart (known in the SA as a Trupp or a Sturm) and makes one reference to being subordinate to a Scharführer, which Karl calls his "section leader" (this individual is never actually seen). Because of his motor mechanic skills, Karl is appointed to the SA transportation section sometime before May 1933. It is in this capacity that Karl witnesses the crushing of Germany's unions on May Day. Shortly thereafter, Karl becomes attached to the SA Supreme Headquarters in Stuttgart and begins working for an SA-Gruppenführer named Josef Biegler. Biegler comments that Karl (who is still only a simple SA-Trooper), is not getting promoted since he is viewed somewhat as a troublemaker.

Karl is working as Biegler's driver when the Night of the Long Knives occurs and Karl witnesses the execution of SA Chief Ernst Röhm, Biegler and other SA leaders. Karl is then thrown into Dachau concentration camp and it is at this point that his SA career appears to end. The film incorrectly states that the SA was disbanded, when in fact the SA continued to exist until 1945; Karl's early membership in the SA would have qualified him for status as an Alte Kämpfer (considered a high honor of the Nazi Party); however, this is never discussed in the film and Karl appears to be finished with his Nazi affiliation after 1934.

Just four years later, Karl is again arrested, this time by the Gestapo for making inquiries in the SA crushing of the trade unions in 1933. During the union actions, Karl's former employer and family friend Rudolf Longner (Ivor Roberts) was seriously paralyzed and used a wheelchair. After Longner's death, Karl seeks justice against the original SA soldiers who caused the injuries. However, when Karl attempts to make a statement at a local Ordnungspolizei police station, he is told that he will be reported to the Gestapo and "They won't like your story, they won't like you either." Karl insists on making his statement anyway, and is subsequently arrested.

To avoid a return trip to a concentration camp, Karl is drafted into the Wehrmacht and serves as an ordinary Soldat in the German Army. After service in Poland, Karl participates in Operation Barbarossa, shortly after which he is commissioned as a lieutenant and later receives a further promotion to Oberleutnant. This is the extent of Karl's military career, as he deserts shortly after the Third Battle of Kharkov. From this point on, Karl moves about Germany on false travel papers, narrowly avoiding arrest after the July 20th plot. Karl is the only member of his family to survive the war in 1945.

Dates of Rank

- SA-Mann: 1932
- SA-Sturmmann: 1933
- Schutze (Wehrmacht): 1938
- Leutnant: 1941
- Oberleutnant: 1942

Awards

- Iron Cross (First and Second Class)
- Eastern Front Medal
- Infantry Assault Badge (in Silver)
- Crimea Shield

Karl would also qualify for the Wound Badge, but appears to have deserted from the army before it was awarded.

=== Helmut Hoffmann ===
played by Bill Nighy

Helmut Hoffmann begins the film between the age of 20 and 22, attending LMU Munich, studying classic literature. One of his favorite professors is a Jewish teacher of German literature, Ludwig Rosenberg. Helmut is first introduced to the Nazi Party when he meets Reinhard Heydrich at fencing practice in the university sports center in Munich. At first, Helmut sees the Nazi ideology as "primitive rubbish" but is eventually talked into joining the Nazis when he witnesses a meeting between Adolf Hitler and German industrialists at the Ruhr.

Helmut joins the SS in January 1933, just after Hitler is appointed as Chancellor of Germany. Resigning from the university, Helmut travels to Berlin and becomes an officer in the Sicherheitsdienst (SD). His formal title is "Special Assistant to Heydrich"; however, what Helmut actually does in the SS (apart for delivering paperwork to Heydrich) is not made entirely clear and only once is anyone seen working for him.

By late August 1939, Helmut is an SS-Sturmbannführer (major) and is shown assisting both Heydrich and Heinrich Müller in organizing the staging of the Gleiwitz incident. By 1940, he has become involved with Einsatzgruppen administration and attends a high-level meeting regarding the execution of the upper class of Poland. By the time of the Soviet invasion in 1941, Helmut is an SS-Obersturmbannführer (lieutenant colonel) and is still serving in the SD when Reinhard Heydrich is made the Acting Reich Protector of the Protectorate of Bohemia and Moravia.

In one scene, Helmut is advised that Heydrich is leaving Berlin for Prague and that:

"You better hope Himmler has a job for you, or you'll find yourself fighting Russians". In the very next scene, set a year later after the assassination of Heydrich, Helmut is shown wearing a closed collar SS tunic of the Waffen-SS, along with several combat medals and a ribbon for service on the Eastern Front. While not directly stated in the film, it does appear that Helmut did find himself fighting Russians.

After assisting in the destruction of the Czech town of Lidice, Helmut is promoted to the rank of senior colonel in the SS and, in the summer of 1944, assists in the round-up of suspects in the July 20th plot on Adolf Hitler's life. When World War II reaches its end in 1945, Helmut is a worn out man who realizes that his service in the SS helped nothing and that he had participated in terrible crimes. In late April 1945, while attempting to desert the ruins of Berlin, Helmut is shot and killed by an SS Werwolf patrol.

Dates of ranks

- SS-Obersturmführer: 1933
- SS-Hauptsturmführer: 1938
- SS-Sturmbannführer: 1939
- SS-Obersturmbannführer: 1941
- SS-Standartenführer: 1942
- SS-Oberführer: 1944

Although not shown on screen, Helmut appears to have held the rank of SS-Untersturmführer sometime in early 1933.

Awards

- Iron Cross (First and Second Class)
- War Merit Cross (First Class with swords)
- Eastern Front Medal
- German National Sports Badge (Silver)

=== Becker ===
played by Warren Clarke

Becker is a Waffen-SS officer who first appears in the film during the spring of 1933. The character is portrayed as a fanatical Nazi who obeys orders without questions. He becomes an early friend to Helmut Hoffmann, but it is made clear during the film that Becker's friendship with Helmut is a means to an end, and Becker usually meets with Helmut to ask for favors or to gain an advantage for himself.

When first introduced, Becker is a platoon officer of the Leibstandarte Adolf Hitler. He is apparently an "old Nazi" and holds both the Honour Chevron for the Old Guard and the Golden Party Badge, indicating early Nazi Party membership prior to 1933.

In 1934, Becker leads a team of SS troopers during the Night of the Long Knives and is responsible for supervising the execution of several SA generals. He also unwittingly orders the arrest of Helmut Hoffmann's brother Karl when the latter is present at the Bad Wiessee resort when the SA is attacked by the SS. Following this, Becker is not seen again until after the Anschluss of Austria in 1938, this time as an SS captain still serving in the Leibstandarte. An oddity occurs during his 1938 appearance, in that Becker is shown wearing the Iron Cross Second Class which was not re-introduced in the German military until 1939. A costume error also occurs at this time when Becker is seen wearing the shoulder insignia of a lieutenant colonel on his captain's uniform.

By 1944, Becker has risen to the rank of SS-Obersturmbannführer in the Waffen-SS but, oddly enough, does not appear to have earned any additional medals from those seen in 1938. His last appearance in the film is during an interrogation following the July 20th plot; his fate at the end of the war is unknown.

Dates of rank

- SS-Obersturmführer: 1933
- SS-Hauptsturmführer: 1938
- SS-Sturmbannführer: 1940
- SS-Obersturmbannführer: 1943

Becker's rank history prior to 1933 is unknown.

Awards

- Golden Nazi Party Badge
- Iron Cross (Second Class)
- German National Sports Badge (Bronze)
- Honour Chevron for the Old Guard

=== Ludwig Rosenberg ===
played by José Ferrer

Ludwig Rosenberg is a Jewish tenured professor of German literature at the University of Stuttgart. He is a mentor and friend to Helmut Hoffmann and, at the beginning of the film, appears to be in his early to mid 60s. In 1932, before the Nazis come to power, he is briefly accosted on the streets of Stuttgart by three SA men; Karl and Helmut Hoffmann come to his defense and fight with the SA men who then retreat.

A specialty of Rosenberg's are the works of Johann Wolfgang von Goethe and his depiction of the human condition. After the Nazis come to power, Rosenberg wonders how the German philosopher's ideas would relate to the present Nazi regime. Specifically, the work "Elective Affinities" is mentioned and, during a meeting with Helmut in 1933, the future SS officer quotes a line from Goethe stating "you must the hammer or the anvil be", stating that the Hoffmanns have been the anvil long enough and need to do some hammering. Rosenberg replies that "if Goethe had spent much time in the blacksmith shop, he would have found that the hammer tends to wear out a lot sooner than the anvil". He then asks Helmut to do his hammering "with a little discretion".

By 1934, Professor Rosenberg has been dismissed from his university position due to his Jewish heritage. By 1936, his home has been confiscated and he lives out of a small apartment in a run-down area of the city. Rosenberg keeps to himself for the next few years, but is eventually targeted for "re-settlement" and ordered by the SS to report to a local train station which, in reality, will be for transport to a death camp. At this point, Rosenberg simply wishes to die rather than live in a Nazi world, and he voluntarily accepts transport to the death camp, even after a sympathetic SS officer (whose brother Rosenberg once taught) offers to help him escape. It is implied that Rosenberg perished in an extermination camp sometime in 1944.

=== Mitzi Templer ===
played by Lucy Gutteridge

A female friend of the Hoffmann brothers, she is first introduced working at a beer hall as a waitress. She is an excellent singer, and early in the movie, shows obvious feelings for Helmut. As the film progresses, Helmut's coldness and Karl's suffering result in Mitzi switching her attention to Karl. She does tell Helmut that she used to love him, but the SS has changed him too much. She tearfully sees Karl off to the war, after the invasion of Poland in 1939, asking him to promise to return. Later, as the war progresses, she becomes a singer entertaining the troops. It is at a show for the army troops that she meets Karl outside Kharkov. After the show, the couple spend romantic time together and make love.

After the July 20th 1944 attempt on Hitler's life, Karl goes to see Mitzi at her apartment house as an air raid pummels Berlin. Helmut encounters them, and chastises them both. At the end of the war in Europe, she is the only one waiting for Karl, as Helmut and the rest of his family are dead. As the credits roll, the two walk off into the uncertain future of defeated Germany.

=== Putzi ===
played by Tony Randall

A German comedian who employs Mitzi as a singer as part of a traveling morale booster for the troops. He is known to make thinly veiled cracks at the Nazi regime in his comedy routine. He is later arrested by the SS and brutally interrogated to the point of death by Becker as Helmut watches in growing disgust.

=== Uncle Walter ===
played by Stratford Johns

Uncle Walter is the portly, wise-cracking tavern keeper of the pub that the Hoffmann brothers frequented during the early stages of the film. This character is portrayed as having been in his early 60's, and at one point stated that he personally remembered when Otto von Bismarck was Chancellor of Germany. Uncle Walter died in the Dachau concentration camp in 1934, after being presumably interned there for making disparaging jokes about the Nazi regime.

=== Albrect and Gerda Hoffmann ===
played by Robert Urquhart and Carroll Baker

=== Hans Hoffmann ===
played by Peter Marquis, Jodie Andrews, and Caspian Batorv

Helmut and Karl's little brother, he is introduced as a baby being baptized in the first few minutes of the movie. As the film progresses, he is the only character to visibly age, growing up steeped in Nazi imagery and propaganda. He is a member of the Hitler Youth, and idolizes Helmut for being an SS officer. At the end of the film, he is in Berlin alongside his fellow Hitler Youth members. When Helmut approaches him with an offer to escape, he is disgusted and lashes out, calling Helmut a traitor. Hans is then seen fighting the Russians in Berlin, using a Panzerfaust to blow up a footbridge which two Russian soldiers are firing machine guns from. However, Hans is eventually killed, and Karl finds his body stacked amongst those of others at the end.

=== Historical Nazi characters ===
Apart from Adolf Hitler (played by actor Colin Jeavons), several historical figures in the SA and the SS appear in the film. These include:

- Reinhard Heydrich (played by David Warner)
- Ernst Röhm (played by Michael Elphick)
- Heinrich Himmler (played by John Normington)
- Theodor Eicke (played by Derek Newark)
- Sepp Dietrich (played by Bernard Lloyd)
- Viktor Lutze (played by John Dicks)

The character of SA-Gruppenführer Josef Biegler (played by actor Paul Brooke) was a composite of several real life SA generals and not based on any one particular person. David Warner, who played Heydrich, originally played the SS general in the 1978 TV miniseries Holocaust.

== Release ==
The original version of Hitler's SS: Portrait in Evil was released in February 1985 on network television and ran either as a single four-hour program or as two two-hour instalments. Both versions were edited for commercials.

The next significant broadcast of the film was on the History Channel which broadcast the film as part of its "Movies in Time" series with Sander Vanocur. The film was run for three hours with significant edits and cutting of several major scenes. A VHS release of the entire film was available in the early 1990s and the film was released on DVD sometime after 2001. The original DVD version of the film cut the entire first half of the film, providing a brief summary in an introduction clip and then began with the invasion of Poland in 1939.

The most recent release on DVD was part of a "War Classics" series released by a private vendor which placed the uncut version of the film on a DVD with three other features, these being Eagles Attack at Dawn, Commandos, and Go for Broke!.
