= William Kerstetter =

American academic (1913-1996)

William E. Kerstetter (1913–1996) was president of DePauw University and earlier of Simpson College.

Kerstetter had a bachelor's degree from Dickinson College. He had a Ph.D. from Boston University. He was an ordained Methodist minister who spent most of his career in academia. Before he became president of Simpson College he was a professor of philosophy at Hamline University. From 1953-63, he was president of Simpson College. Under his leadership the college grew and it initiated an exchange program with Oxford University.

Kerstetter became president of DePauw in 1963. He immediately began a major fundraising campaign. The main buildings constructed at DePauw during Kerstetter's tenure were the women's upper class dormitory known as Hogate Hall and the science building which in 1982 was named the Julian Science and Mathematics Center after DePauw alumni Percy L. Julian. During Kerstetter's tenure, the connection between DePauw and the Methodist Church was lessened.

Despite his success with fundraising, Kerstetter was a weak president. His relationship with the faculty was tenuous at best and he eschewed contact with them. At a time when heightened awareness of civil rights and resistance to the war in Vietnam were beginning to manifest themselves on campus Kerstetter withdrew more and more from contact with students. In 1967, peaceful demonstrations on campus began in earnest and a large sit-in was staged on the President's residence. In 1975, Kerstetter resigned as president of DePauw but was appointed Chancellor of the University with responsibility almost exclusively in the matter of fundraising. Kerstetter retired from the latter position in 1978.

== Sources ==
- DePauw Library article on Kerstetter
- Biographies of past presidents of Simpson College
