= Still Crazy =

1998 film by Brian Gibson

- Theatrical release poster
- Directed by: Brian Gibson
- Written by: Dick Clement; Ian La Frenais
- Produced by: Amanda Marmot
- Starring: Stephen Rea; Billy Connolly; Jimmy Nail; Timothy Spall; Bill Nighy; Juliet Aubrey; Helena Bergström; Bruce Robinson
- Cinematography: Ashley Rowe
- Edited by: Peter Boyle
- Music by: Clive Langer
- Distributed by: Columbia Pictures
- Release date: 30 October 1998
- Running time: 95 minutes
- Country: United Kingdom
- Language: English
- Box office: $524,864

Still Crazy is a 1998 British comedy film directed by Brian Gibson (his final film before his death in 2004). The plot concerns a fictional 1970s rock band named Strange Fruit, who, two decades after splitting up, are persuaded to get back together to perform at a reunion in the same concert venue where they played their last gig. The film focuses on the personal lives of the band members and those closest to them, their individual experiences with approaching middle-age and the success that eluded them.

It was nominated for two Golden Globes in 1999 in two categories: Best Motion Picture – Musical or Comedy and Best Original Song.

== Plot ==
The band Strange Fruit performs at the 1977 Wisbech Rock Festival. Hughie Case tells how, due to the pursuit of "fame, fortune and fornication" – and the drug overdose of their original singer, Keith Lovell – this is their last performance. After various issues, the band prematurely ends their performance, frustrated over competing egos and members' lack of self-control.

Twenty years later, a stranger who turns out to be the Festival's founder's son recognises keyboardist Tony Costello and convinces him to reunite the band for an anniversary show. Tony tracks down Karen Knowles, their original runaround-girl. Reluctant, she is inspired to return after finding memorabilia. She insists on being the manager, and Tony agrees. Gradually, Karen and Tony track down other members: bassist Les Wickes, now a family man and roofer; drummer David "Beano" Baggot, working at a plant nursery and on the run from the taxman; and lead singer Ray Simms who, after years of drug and alcohol abuse, is now sober. Though claiming to be working on a solo album, Simms has not released anything in ten years.

The band meets up at the Red Lion pub. Everyone expects Brian Lovell, the band's lead guitarist, to be there. Karen says she could not find him but learned he donated his royalties to charity; everyone assumes he died. Their roadie, Hughie, turns up during their first rehearsal to resume his original role. Ray insists on playing guitar but is convinced to sing. They find a replacement for Brian in young Luke Shand, a talented guitarist who is ignorant of the band's tensions.

Following a warm up European tour, Karen negotiates for the rights to their catalogue. Their initial performances are poorly received. Les, Beano and Hughie have little hope for the band, believing the dead Keith and missing Brian to be the main talent. Tony propositions Karen but she resists, remaining attached to Brian. At a gig, Ray's over-the-top ideas backfire and Les and Ray walk off. Following a confrontation with Les, Ray has a nervous breakdown, exacerbated by turning fifty. Ray leaves the gig, buys drugs and falls into a canal. Karen's daughter rescues him and Ray's wife blames Karen for his troubles. Following an angry reaction from locals over the noise, the band escape to their bus and flee.

Les and Ray make up and Ray says he "received a positive message" from Brian's ghost. The bus breaks down and Karen confronts the band about their lack of confidence. When the band meet a girl wearing a Strange Fruit tour T-shirt that belonged to her father, they take it as a good sign. The next few shows go well; the band becomes more optimistic. Following a record deal, the band records a new song written and sung by Les, which Ray had never allowed. After watching a recorded drunken TV interview in which Les and Beano imply that the band was better with Keith and Brian, Ray breaks down again and quits.

As the band members return to their former lives, Karen and Claire visit Keith's grave to pay their respects. They find a note that quotes "The Flame Still Burns", a tribute to Keith written by Brian. Hughie is then confronted by Karen and reluctantly admits he knows Brian is alive. Karen and Tony find Brian in a psychiatric hospital. He explains he gave up his material possessions to sever himself from his previous life. When he agrees to rejoin the band, the others follow. At a pre-show press conference, hostile questions cause Brian to walk out. Everyone but Luke follows and Luke chastises the journalists. Visibly shaken, Brian decides to back out of the show but gives his blessing.

Beano nearly misses the set when a stalker-groupie, whom he has long mistaken for a tax officer, demands sex. The band starts their set with the same song with which they opened up the last Wisbech Festival. Though Ray's confidence is shaken, Tony saves him by playing "The Flame Still Burns". Brian is pleased to hear the band playing the song, which helps him finally overcome his demons and joins the band onstage to play an inspiring guitar solo, much to everyone's surprise and delight.

== Cast ==
- Bill Nighy as Ray Simms
- Juliet Aubrey as Karen Knowles
- Billy Connolly as Hughie Case
- Stephen Rea as Tony Costello
- Jimmy Nail as Les Wickes
- Timothy Spall as David "Beano" Baggot
- Hans Matheson as Luke Shand
- Bruce Robinson as Brian Lovell
- Lee Williams as Young Keith Lovell
- Rachael Stirling as Clare Knowles
- Helena Bergström as Astrid Simms
- Alphonsia Emmanuel as Camille
- Phil Daniels as Neil Gaydon
- Peter Baynham as Karen's Boss
- Zoë Ball as Herself
- Frances Barber as Lady In Black
- Rupert Penry-Jones as Young Ray Simms
- Virginia Clay as Young Karen Knowles
- Luke Garrett as Young Hughie Case
- Gavin Kennedy as Young Tony Costello
- Alex Palmer as Young Les Wickes
- Sean McKenzie as Young David "Beano" Baggot
- Matthew Finney as Young Brian Lovell

== Production ==
=== Development ===
Still Crazy was written by Dick Clement and Ian La Frenais, who had previously collaborated on music-related projects including The Commitments. The writers developed the story around the idea of ageing rock musicians confronting past relationships and the fading of fame. Director Brian Gibson became attached to the project and was drawn to the screenplay’s balance of comedy and emotional reflection.

=== Casting ===
The film stars Bill Nighy, Stephen Rea, Jimmy Nail, Timothy Spall and Juliet Aubrey. Reviews noted that the ensemble conveyed the long-established tensions of a band reuniting after decades apart. Bill Nighy’s performance as frontman Ray Simms was highlighted for combining theatrical flamboyance with vulnerability.

== Reception ==
=== Critical response ===
Review aggregator Rotten Tomatoes gives the film a 73% approval rating based on 26 reviews and an average score of 6.56/10. The site's critics consensus reads: "Still Crazy can't completely escape the shadow left by the classic rock mockumentaries of the past, but it earns a commendable number of laughs in its own right." Rolling Stone's Peter Travers praised Brian Gibson's direction for crafting a "solid blend of humor and heart", the performances from the main cast (highlighting Nighy's portrayal of Ray), and the musical contributions from Mick Jones and Chris Difford for capturing '70s rock bombast, calling it a "prime piece of entertainment." Entertainment Weekly's Lisa Schwarzbaum gave the movie a B+ rating, saying "The ensemble acting is fun, generous, and gentle, and the music […] is as good as Strange Fruit ought to be, with classically grandiose '70s poetic sentiments. When the band hits its reunion climax, Still Crazy encourages frankly emotional tears. And why not: There's nothing more comforting than the sight of grizzled old guys rocking on while the rest of us buy a ticket to feel young." Marc Savlov from The Austin Chronicle gave initial praise to the film's "wicked comic energy" found early on, but felt it devolves into "a deadly dull mishmash" it never gets out of, saying "The problem with Still Crazy isn't that it's overly earnest (which it is) or that it's too easy to make fun of (minimum effort required), it's that cast and crew alike seem primed for comedy in the film's first half, and then abruptly depart those Nigel Tufnel-ed plains in favor of some serious soul-searching halfway in." Joshua Klein of The A.V. Club found the film "overly dramatic and often dull" compared to This Is Spinal Tap and The Rutles, saying that if you look past its "cheap charm" you have a mishandled topic about middle-aged former rockers who lack sympathy for viewers to care about.

=== Accolades ===
In 1999, Still Crazy received two nominations at the 56th Golden Globe Awards for Best Motion Picture – Musical or Comedy and Best Original Song for "The Flame Still Burns" by Chris Difford, Marti Frederiksen and Mick Jones, but lost both awards to Shakespeare in Love and "The Prayer" from Quest for Camelot respectively.

== Soundtrack ==
=== Strange Fruit songs ===
The songs that the band Strange Fruit perform in the film are:

- "The Flame Still Burns"
- "All Over the World"
- "Dirty Town"
- "Black Moon"
- "Bird on a Wire"
- "Scream Freedom"
- "Dangerous Things"
- "What Might Have Been"

Also, "Stealin'" is performed by Billy Connolly's character.
