= Simon Brett =

English writer (born 1945)

Simon Brett OBE FRSL
- Born: Simon Anthony Lee Brett; 28 October 1945 (age 81); Worcester Park, Surrey, England
- Occupations: Writer, producer, playwright
- Writing career
- Genre: Detective fiction
- Notable work: Charles Paris series
- Website: simonbrett.com

Simon Anthony Lee Brett OBE FRSL (born 28 October 1945 in Worcester Park, Surrey, England) is a British author of detective fiction, a playwright, and a producer-writer for television and radio. As an author, he is notable for several mystery series. His radio credits have included The Hitchhiker's Guide to the Galaxy, I'm Sorry I Haven't a Clue and Just a Minute.

== Personal life ==
The son of chartered surveyor John Brett and Margaret (née Lee), a teacher, he had two siblings. He was educated at Dulwich College and Wadham College, Oxford, where he gained a first-class honours degree in English. He is married with three children and lives in Arundel, West Sussex, England.

Brett was the president of the Detection Club from 2000 to 2015. He was appointed Officer of the Order of the British Empire (OBE) in the 2016 New Year Honours for services to literature.

He was awarded an honorary MA by the University of Chichester in 2007. In 2015, Brett was elected a Fellow of the Royal Society of Literature.

== Radio and television career ==
After his graduation from Oxford University, Brett joined the BBC as a trainee and worked for BBC Radio and London Weekend Television. While with the BBC, Brett produced the pilot episode of The Hitchhiker's Guide to the Galaxy, as well as many episodes of the comedy series The Burkiss Way, as well as the comedy panel games I'm Sorry I Haven't a Clue and Just a Minute and radio adaptations of Lord Peter Wimsey. He also co-produced From Us To You for BBC Radio 4 with David Hatch. In the mid-1990s, Brett wrote and hosted Foul Play, a radio panel game in which writers of detective fiction were challenged to solve a dramatised mystery. When he moved into television, Brett was responsible for producing End of Part One (1979–80) and the television revival of The Glums (1979), both for LWT.

Brett wrote several sitcoms, including BBC Radio 4's After Henry, No Commitments, Semi Circles and Smelling of Roses. After Henry was later produced on television for ITV. He has written episodes of the BBC radio detective drama Baldi (2000).

In 1987, the Nigel Molesworth character created by Geoffrey Willans was reprised for a four-part BBC Radio 4 series Molesworth. Written by Simon Brett, the series portrayed Molesworth in middle age, still surrounded by many of the characters from his youth. Molesworth was played by Willie Rushton, with Penelope Nice as his wife Louise, and Clive Swift as the now-aged ex-headmaster Grimes.

== Bibliography ==
=== Detective novels ===
Brett has written five series of detective novels (Charles Paris, Mrs Pargeter, Fethering, Blotto & Twinks, and the Decluttering Mysteries). Most of these novels are in the "Golden Age" tradition of detective fiction, entertaining the reader through humour, eccentric characters and intricate plot twists. He has also written several mystery plays and some non-series novels, of which A Shock to the System (1984) is probably best known because the filmed version starred Michael Caine as the business executive who takes revenge after being passed over for promotion. In 2014, Brett was chosen as the recipient of the Cartier Diamond Dagger from the Crime Writers' Association for "an outstanding body of work in crime fiction".

==== Charles Paris ====
To date, Brett has written 23 books about Charles Paris, an unhappily separated (but not divorced, more than 30 years on), moderately successful character actor with a slight drinking problem, who investigates the murders he encounters in the course of his career.

1. Cast, In Order of Disappearance (1975)
2. So Much Blood (1976)
3. Star Trap (1977)
4. An Amateur Corpse (1978)
5. A Comedian Dies (1979)
6. The Dead Side of the Mic (1980)
7. Situation Tragedy (1981)
8. Murder Unprompted (1982)
9. Murder in the Title (1983)
10. Not Dead, Only Resting (1984)
11. Dead Giveaway (1985)
12. Short story "The Haunted Actress" in A Box of Tricks (1985)
13. What Bloody Man Is That? (1987)
14. A Series of Murders (1989)
15. Corporate Bodies (1991)
16. A Reconstructed Corpse (1993)
17. Sicken and So Die (1995)
18. Dead Room Farce (1998)
19. Short story "Doctor Theatre" in Original Sins ed. Martin Edwards (2010)
20. A Decent Interval (2013)
21. The Cinderella Killer (2014)
22. A Deadly Habit (2018)
23. Short story "Cast in Order of Reappearance" in Playing Dead: Short stories in honour of Simon Brett by members of The Detection Club ed. Martin Edwards (2025); this volume also includes the short story "Lookalike" by Kate Ellis, in which Charles Paris also appears

They have been adapted for BBC Radio, mostly by Jeremy Front and starring Bill Nighy.

==== Mrs Pargeter ====
Mrs Pargeter is a widow with a shadowy past who, with a little help from her dead husband's friends, is able to solve uncanny mysteries. The Mrs Pargeter novels include:

1. A Nice Class of Corpse (1986)
2. Mrs, Presumed Dead (1988)
3. Mrs Pargeter's Package (1990)
4. Mrs Pargeter's Pound of Flesh (1992)
5. Mrs Pargeter's Plot (1996)
6. Mrs Pargeter's Point of Honour (1999)
7. Mrs Pargeter's Principle (2015)
8. Mrs Pargeter's Public Relations (2017)
9. Mrs Pargeter's Patio (2023)
10. Mrs Pargeter's Past (2025)

==== Fethering ====
Fethering is a fictitious village on England's south coast (adjacent to Tarring). It is the place of residence of amateur sleuths Carole Seddon, a retired civil servant, and her neighbour, Jude Nichol, whose origins are obscure. Twenty-two Fethering mysteries have been published so far:

1. The Body on the Beach (2000)
2. Death on the Downs (2001)
3. The Torso in the Town (2002)
4. Murder in the Museum (2003)
5. The Hanging in the Hotel (2004)
6. The Witness at the Wedding (2005)
7. The Stabbing in the Stables (2006)
8. Death Under the Dryer (2007)
9. Blood at the Bookies (2008)
10. The Poisoning at the Pub (2009)
11. The Shooting in the Shop (2010)
12. Bones Under the Beach Hut (2011)
13. Guns in the Gallery (2011)
14. Corpse on the Court (2012)
15. The Strangling on the Stage (2013)
16. The Tomb in Turkey (2014)
17. The Killing in the Cafe (2015)
18. The Liar in the Library (2017)
19. The Killer in the Choir (2019)
20. Guilt at the Garage (2020)
21. Death and the Decorator (2022)
22. Death in the Dressing Room (2025)

Since 2011, Brett's Fethering series has been published by Severn House.

==== Blotto and Twinks ====
Farcical whodunnits set just after the First World War and featuring the handsome and dim "Blotto" and his beautiful and clever sister "Twinks", both from a ducal family.

1. Blotto, Twinks and the Ex-King's Daughter (2009)
2. Blotto, Twinks and the Dead Dowager Duchess (2010)
3. Blotto, Twinks and the Rodents of the Riviera (2011)
4. Blotto, Twinks and the Bootlegger's Moll (2012)
5. Blotto, Twinks and the Riddle of the Sphinx (2013)
6. Blotto, Twinks and the Heir to the Tsar (2015)
7. Blotto, Twinks and the Stars of the Silver Screen (2017)
8. Blotto, Twinks and the Intimate Revue (2018)
9. Blotto, Twinks and the Great Road Race (2019)
10. Blotto, Twinks and the Maharajah's Jewel (2021)
11. Blotto, Twinks and the Suspicious Guests (2022)
12. Blotto, Twinks and the Conquistadors Gold (2023)
13. Blotto, Twinks and the Phantom Skiers (2024)

==== Nigel Molesworth ====
A continuation of the Nigel Molesworth books, featuring a now middle aged Nigel.

1. Molesworth Rites Again (1983)
2. How to Stay Topp (1987)

==== Decluttering Mystery ====
Features Ellen Curtis, a widow with two grown children whose decluttering business brings her into contact with murder.

1. The Clutter Corpse (2020)
2. An Untidy Death (2021)
3. Waste of a Life (2022)
4. A Messy Murder (2024)
5. A Disorganized Death (2026)

=== Plays ===
- Murder in Play (1994)
- Mr Quigley's Revenge (1995)
- Silhouette (1998)
- The Tale of Little Red Riding Hood (1998)
- Sleeping Beauty (1999)
- Putting the Kettle on (2002)
- A Bad Dream (2005)
- Quirks (2009)
- A Healthy Grave (2010)
- Murder with Ghosts (2015)

=== Anthologies ===
- The Faber book of Useful Verse (1981)
- Take a Spare Truss (1983)
- The Faber book of Parodies (1984)
- The Faber book of Diaries (1987)
- The Detection Collection (2005)

=== Frank Muir Goes into ===
Each book is a compilation of the anecdotes taken from the BBC Radio 4 series 'Frank Muir Goes into', which was produced by Brett and presented by Frank Muir and Alfred Marks.

- Frank Muir Goes into... (1978)
- The Second Frank Muir Goes into... (1979)
- The Third Frank Muir Goes into... (1980)
- Frank Muir on Children (1980)
- The Fourth Frank Muir Goes into... (1981)
- Frank Muir presents the Book of Comedy Sketches (1982)

=== How to Be a Little Sod ===
- How to Be a Little Sod (1992)
- Look Who's Walking: Further Diaries of a Little Sod (1994)
- Not Another Little Sod! (1997)

=== Other ===
- The Child-Owner's Handbook (1983)
- A Shock to the System (1984)
- Bad Form (1984)
- Dead Romantic (1985)
- People-Spotting (1985)
- The Three Detectives and the Missing Superstar (1986)
- The Wastepaper Basket Archive (1986)
- After Henry (1987)
- The Three Detectives and the Knight in Armour (1987)
- The Booker Book (1989)
- The Christmas Crimes at Puzzel Manor (1991)
- Look Who's Walking (1994)
- Singled Out (1995)
- Baby Tips for Dads (2005)
- Baby Tips for Mums (2005)
- The Penultimate Chance Saloon (2006)
