= Diane Setterfield =

English author

- Born: 22 August 1964 (age 62)
- Occupation: Novelist
- Writing career
- Period: 2006–present
- Genres: Gothic, Suspense

Diane Setterfield (born 22 August 1964) is an English author whose 2006 debut novel, The Thirteenth Tale, became a New York Times No. 1 best-seller. Setterfield won the 2007 Quill Award, debut author of the year, for the novel. It is written in the Gothic tradition, with echoes of Brontë sisters' Jane Eyre (1847) and Wuthering Heights (1847).

The rights were acquired by David Heyman at Heyday Films and the novel was adapted for television by Christopher Hampton. Starring Vanessa Redgrave, Olivia Colman, and Sophie Turner, The Thirteenth Tale was televised on BBC Two in December 2013.

Diane Setterfield's second novel, Bellman & Black, was published in 2013 by Emily Bestler Books/Atria in the United States and by Orion in the UK. Her third novel, Once Upon a River, was published in 2018.

Before writing, Setterfield studied French literature at the University of Bristol, earning a Bachelor of Arts in 1986 and a PhD in 1993. Setterfield's PhD is on "autobiographical structures in André Gide's early fiction." Setterfield taught at schools as well as privately before leaving teaching in the late 1990s.

Setterfield grew up in Theale, Berkshire. She lives in Oxford, England.

== Awards ==
- Quill Award (2007) for The Thirteenth Tale

== Novels ==
- The Thirteenth Tale (2006)
- Bellman & Black (2013)
- Once Upon a River (2018)
