= Universal Global Television =

British/American international television division

- Formerly: NBCUniversal International Television Production (2008–15); NBCUniversal International Studios (2015–21); Universal International Studios (2021–26)
- Industry: Television
- Predecessor: Universal Content Productions
- Founded: July 2005; 21 years ago
- Founders: Angela Bromstad; Michael Edelstein
- Headquarters: London, England; Los Angeles, California
- Key people: Beatrice Springhorn (president)
- Products: Television programs
- Parent: Universal Studio Group
- Divisions: NBCUniversal Formats; Universal Television Alternative Studio UK
- Subsidiaries: Carnival Films; Heyday Television; Lark Productions; Working Title Television
- Website: https://nbcuproductions.com/

Universal Global Television is an international television production division of American television production group Universal Studio Group. It was headquartered in London, England, with offices in Los Angeles, California and Sydney, Australia. The company owned seven production companies and produces scripted and unscripted programmes for international markets, along with international adaptations of NBCUniversal's formats, a subsidiary of NBCUniversal. The company is headquartered in London, England, with offices in Los Angeles, California and Sydney, Australia, and was formed in July 2005.

The studio operates out of dual headquarters in London, England, and Los Angeles, California, developing, producing, and distributing scripted and unscripted programming for both U.S. markets, and international markets.

== History ==
Universal Global Television had their beginnings in July 2005, when American mass media & entertainment conglomerate NBCUniversal launched its own international television production arm that would partner with global media companies to adapt local versions of NBCUniversal's programming library & formats worldwide called NBCUniversal International TV Production as Leslie Jones became president of the company's new global production arm.

In July 2007, NBCUniversal International Television Production expanded its international television production business by launching an international TV production division based in London, England, which would focus on format licensing and developing scripted and reality programming including local adaptations of NBCUniversal's formats for the UK and international markets as part of NBCUniversal International's expansion into TV production by Peter Smith (who was NBCUniversal's president at the time) with former NBCUniversal Television Studio (now Universal Television) president Angela Bromstad heading the new international production division.

In August 2008, NBCUniversal International Television Production acquired London-based British drama production indie Carnival Films from Australian production group Southern Star Group, marking NBCUniversal International Television Production's first production company acquisition, the acquisition included Southern Star's 75% stake in the British production indie with the former will assume distribution to all Carnival's productions starting with Philanthropist.

In February 2010, NBCUniversal International Television Production established a joint venture television production subsidiary with NBCUniversal's British film & television production sibling Working Title Films dedicated to produce drama and comedy programmed based in London named Working Title Television.

In May 2011, NBCUniversal International Television Production expanded their global footprint with the acquisition of a majority stake in Australian film & television production house Matchbox Pictures, marking NBCUniversal International Television Production's expansion into the Australian television market outside of the UK as Matchbox Pictures became a subsidiary of the former with them globally distributing Matchbox's projects alongside the latter's founders Tony Ayres, Helen Bowden, Penny Chapman, Michael McMahon and Helen Panckhurst who continued to run the acquired company. NBCUniversal International Television Production would later take full control of Australian film & television production company Matchbox Pictures three years later in late-January 2014.

In December 2013, NBCUniversal International Television Production had pushed into the unscripted television programming genre by launching a dedicated unscripted television production development unit joining NBCUniversal International Television Productions's fellow other owned in-house unscripted production companies namely British studios Monkey Kingdom and Chocolate Media, Australian production house Matchbox Pictures and Canadian production studio Lark Productions - which NBCUniversal International Television Production has a strategic partnership with the Canadian studio being joined into the new unscripted unit as their senior VP of factual & entertainment David Mortimer overseeing the new division.

In November 2021, NBCUniversal International Studios announced their rebranding of the international production subsidiary of Universal Studio Group and renamed it to Universal Internarional Studios in order to match their alignment with its parent company Universal Studio Group and its sibling American scripted television production studios Universal Television, Universal Content Productions and unscripted production studio Universal Television Alternative Studio with the renamed international production division continued to work on their original scripted & unscripted content for international networks including Comcast-owned Sky worldwide alongside NBCUniversal's own streaming service Peacock and licensing NBCUniversal's formats.

In February 2025, Universal International Studios' parent company Universal Studio Group announced a restructuring of their international unscripted production businesses as they were planning to seek a leadership hire for their creative output outside the US by placing Universal International Studios' British unscripted production company Monkey Kingdom and the unscripted division of UIS' Australian production subsidiary Matchbox Pictures under USG's American unscripted television division Universal Television Alternative Studio as its international production hubs.

In February 2026, Universal International Studios announced it had shuttered its Sydney-based Australian production subsidiary Matchbox Pictures alongside the joint-venture production subsidiary Tony Ayres Productions as Universal International Studios will evaluate production opportunities & continue to produce its local content with Australian producers in Australia.

=== Merger with Universal Content Productions ===
In June 2026, Universal International Studios had merged with Universal Studio Group's fellow cable and streaming production unit Universal Content Productions (whom Universal International Studios previously co-produced Apples Never Fall) into the international television production unit, with UCP's team being merged with those of UIS and had the former renamed into Universal Global Television. Universal Content Productions' development executives, Jennifer Gwarz and Mark Velez, and casting head Steven O’Neill departed from the company while UCP's head of Current Series & EVP, Rebecca Franko, became Universal Global Television's executive Vice-President and its first-look deals being moved to the rebranded merged unit. One week later following the rebranding of Universal International Studios to Universal Global Television after its merger with fellow American cable & streaming production company Universal Content Productions, Universal Global Television signed its very first production deal with them, forming its first-look production partnership with executive producer of UGT's miniseries with its Carnival Films subsidiary, American screenwriter of All Her Fault, Megan Gallagher to develop & produce television series with her as she would develop & produce them for the studio.

One month later in July of that year, following Universal Content Productions folded & merged into Universal International Studios and rebranded into Universal Global Television, Universal Global Television had signed its second production pact as UGT strucked a first-look production pact with the entertainment production company of producer Julius Tennon and actress/producer Viola Davis' JuVee Productions to develop & produce television series under the pact with Universal Global Television serving as the producer for JuVee's series starting with Pawn under the first-look production deal.

== Filmography ==
Title	Years	Network	Notes
Top Chef Canada	2011–present	Flavour Network	co-production with Insight Productions
The Worricker Trilogy	2011–2014	BBC Two	co-production with Heyday Films, Carnival Films, Runaway Fridge TV, Beagle Pug Films and Masterpiece
True Love	2012	BBC One	co-production with Working Title Television
The Hollow Crown	2012–2016	BBC Two; PBS (United States)	co-production with Neal Street Productions, Carnival Films and WNET
The Real Housewives of Melbourne	2014–2021	Fox Arena	co-production with Matchbox Entertainment
The Real Housewives of Cheshire	2015–present	ITVBe	co-production with Universal Television Alternative Studio UK
You, Me and the Apocalypse	2015	Sky One; NBC (United States)	co-production with Sky UK, Working Title Television and BigBalls Films
London Spy	2015	BBC Two	co-production with Working Title Television and BBC America
Gone	2017–2018	TF1 (France); VOX (Germany)	co-production with The Colleton Company and The Neptune Way.
Tamara's World	2017	ITVBe	co-production with Monkey Kingdom
Suits South Korea	2018	KBS2	co-production with Monster Union and EnterMedia
Suits Japan	2018–present	Fuji TV	A Japanese adaptation of Suits created by Aaron Korsh; co-production with Kyodo Television
Hanna	2019–2021	Amazon Prime Video	co-production with Amazon Studios, Tomorrow Studios, Working Title Television and Focus Features; Based on the film of the same name by David Farr and Seth Lochhead
The Case Against Adnan Syed	2019	HBO	co-production with Working Title Television, HBO Documentary Films, Instinct Productions and Disarming Films
Tales of the City	2019	Netflix	co-production with Universal Television, Sweatpants Productions and Working Title Television
The Capture	2019–present	BBC One	co-production with Heyday Television
Fortunate Son	2020	CBC	co-production with Lark Productions and Seven24 Films
Transplant	2020–2024	CTV	co-production with Sphere Media and Bell Media
Pretty Hard Cases	2021–2023	CBC	co-production with Cameron Pictures
Creamiere	2021–present	TVNZ 2	co-production with Tony Ayres Productions, Flat 3 Productions and Kevin & Co.
Clickbait	2021	Netflix	co-production with Matchbox Pictures, Heyday Television and Tony Ayres Productions
Fires	2021	ABC TV	co-production with Matchbox Pictures and Tony Ayres Productions
Dodger	2022–present	CBBC	
Supertitlán	2022	Azteca 7	co-production with Dopamine
The Undeclared War	2022–present	Channel 4; Peacock (United States)	co-production with Playground Entertainment and Stonehedge Films
Everyone Else Burns	2023–present	Channel 4	co-production with Jax Media
One Day	2024	Netflix	co-production with Drama Republic and Focus Features
Allegiance	2024–present	CBC	co-production with Lark Productions
Law & Order Toronto: Criminal Intent	2024–present	CityTV	co-production with Lark Productions and Cameron Pictures; Based on the American TV series Law & Order: Criminal Intent by Dick Wolf
Apples Never Fall	2024	Peacock	co-production with Universal Content Productions, Heyday Television, Matchbox Pictures and Call Me Mel Productions Inc.
Too Much	2025	Netflix	co-production with Working Title Television and Good Thing Going Productions
All Her Fault	2025	Peacock	co-production with Carnival Films
The Burbs	2026-present	Peacock	continued from Universal Content Productions; co-production with Fuzzy Door Productions, Imagine Entertainment and Out of the Blue Productions; Based on the 1989 Universal Pictures film of the same name by Joe Dante
Ted: The Animated Series	2026	Peacock	Took over development from Universal Content Productions; co-production with Fuzzy Door Productions and MRC Television; An animated adaptation of the 2012 film Ted by Seth MacFarlane
1313	TBA	TBA	co-production with Atomic Monster and LAB Brew; inherited from Universal Content Productions
All the Colors of the Dark	TBA	TBA	co-production with Thousand Voices and Dinner Party Productions; inherited from Universal Content Productions
Before I Let Go	TBA	Peacock	Inherited from Universal Content Productions; co-production with Universal Television, Blackmailed Productions and Get Lifted Film Co.
Biological War	TBA	TBA	co-production with Littleton Road Productions
The Birds	TBA	HBO	co-production with Heyday Television and Omni Artists
Charmer	TBA	Sky Atlantic	co-production with Story Films and Working Title Films
Drowning in Paper Flowers	TBA	TBA	co-production with Thousand Voices
Dungeon Crawler Carl	TBA	Peacock	co-production with Fuzzy Door Productions
Future Housewives	TBA	Peacock	co-production with Fuzzy Door Productions
Moral Injuries	TBA	TBA	co-production with Monumental Television
Pawn	TBA	TBA	co-production with JuVee Productions
Untitled Casper the Friendly Ghost live-action series	TBA	Disney+	co-production with DreamWorks Animation Television; inherited from Universal Content Productions
The Von Bulow Affair	TBA	Investigation Discovery	inherited from Universal Content Productions
