= Norma Heyman =

British film producer and actress (born 1937)

Norma Heyman (born 1937) is a British film producer and actress. Heyman produced the 1983 independent film, The Honorary Consul in 1983, becoming the first British woman to produce an independent feature film entirely by herself. In 1988, Heyman and producer Hank Moonjean received an Academy Award for Best Picture nomination for their producing the dramatic film, Dangerous Liaisons.

Her film credits also include the 2005 British comedy, Mrs Henderson Presents, which she produced with Bob Hoskins.

Born Norma Pownall, she married British film producer and talent agent John Heyman in 1960. Norma and John had two children, including David, the founder of Heyday Films and the producer of the Harry Potter film series. John Heyman and Norma Heyman divorced during the 1960s after his affair with actress Joanna Shimkus.

In 2013, she co-produced The Thirteenth Tale with her son David.

== Filmography ==
She was a producer in all films unless otherwise noted.

=== Film ===
Year	Film	Credit
1983	The Honorary Consul	
1987	Empire State	
1988	Buster	
1988	Burning Secret	
1988	Dangerous Liaisons	
1993	The Innocent	
1994	Sister My Sister	
1996	Mary Reilly	
1996	The Secret Agent	
2000	Gangster No. 1	
2001	Kiss Kiss (Bang Bang)	Executive producer
2005	Mrs Henderson Presents	

Thanks

Year	Film	Role
2000	The House of Mirth	Thanks

=== Television ===
Year	Title	Credit	Notes
1993	Screen Two		
2000	Own Goal	Executive producer	
2013	The Thirteenth Tale		Television film

Thanks

Year	Title	Role	Notes
1995	Century of Cinema	Thanks	Documentary
1996	Dr. Jekyll and Mr. Hyde: A Legacy of Fear	Special thanks	Television film
