= Once Upon a River =

Once Upon a River may refer to:

- Once Upon a River (novel), a 2018 novel by Diane Setterfield
- Once Upon a River (film), a 2020 American film, based on the 2011 novel by Bonnie Jo Campbell
