= David Heyman =

English producer (born 1961)

- Heyman at the 2026 New York Film Festival
- Born: David Jonathan Heyman; 26 July 1961 (age 65); London, England
- Education: Westminster School
- Alma mater: Harvard University
- Occupation: Producer
- Years active: 1984–present
- Organisation: Heyday Films
- Notable work: Harry Potter
- Spouse: Rose Uniacke (m. 2006)
- Children: 1
- Parents: John Heyman; Norma Heyman

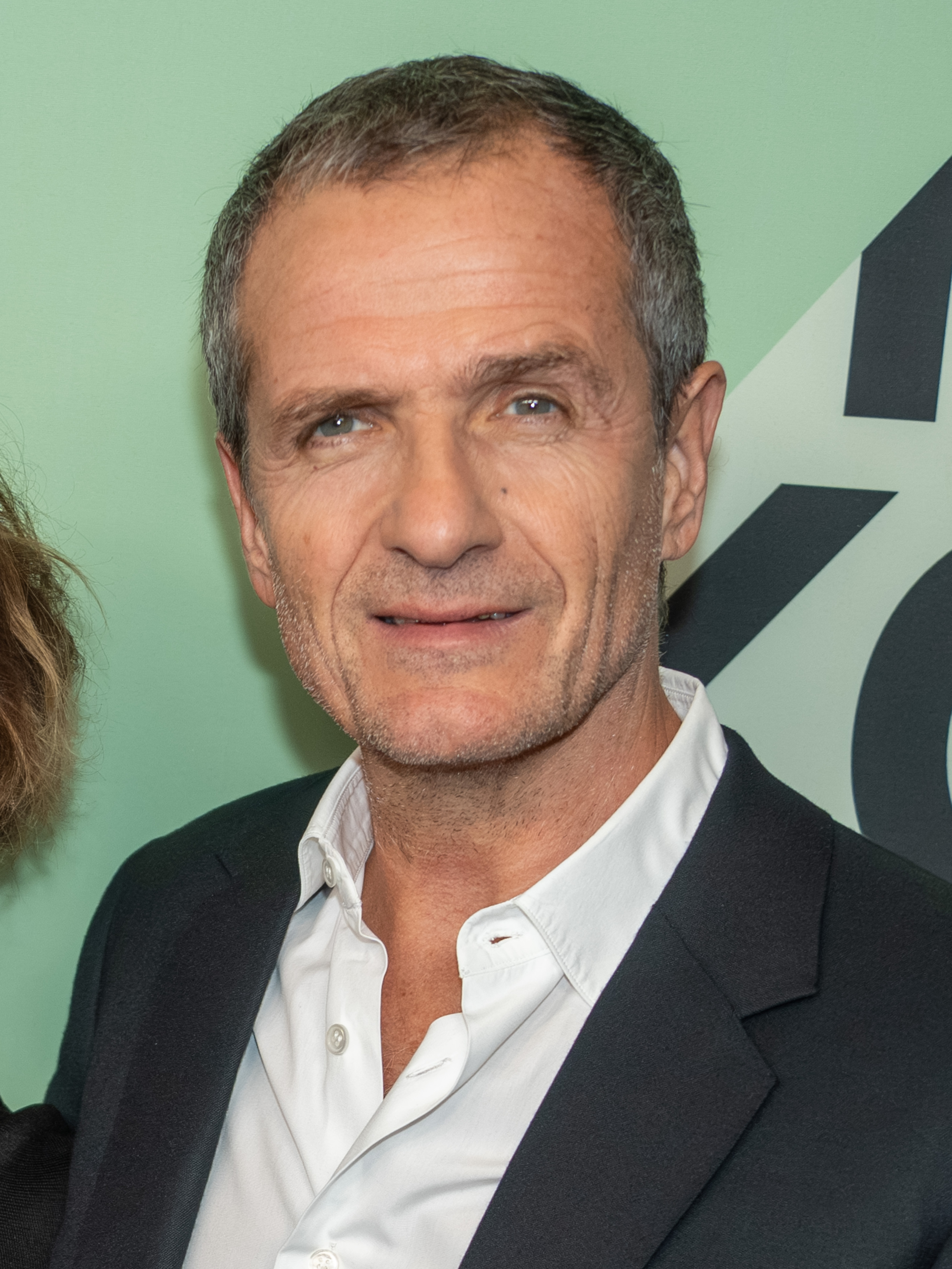
Heyman in 2025

David Jonathan Heyman (born 26 July 1961) is an English film and television producer. He is the founder of Heyday Films and is best known as the producer of all eight installments of the Harry Potter film series, which are based on a series of popular fantasy novels of the same name by author J. K. Rowling. Heyman then also produced all three installments of its spin-off prequel series, Fantastic Beasts. His work makes him the third-most commercially successful producer of all time. He received numerous accolades including five BAFTA Awards, a Daytime Emmy Award and two Producers Guild of America Awards, as well as nominations for four Academy Awards and a Primetime Emmy Award.

== Early life and education ==
Heyman was born in London. He is the son of John Heyman, producer of the films The Go-Between and Jesus, and Norma Heyman (née Pownall), an actress, and Oscar-nominated producer of the films Dangerous Liaisons and Mrs Henderson Presents. His paternal grandparents were German Jews who left Nazi Germany and emigrated to England prior to World War II, while his mother's family was English. At age seven, he was a page boy in the wedding of his godmother, Diana Dors, to actor Alan Lake. Heyman went to Westminster School and, following graduation, he decided to study abroad. He studied art history at Harvard University, where he was an All-American sabreman for the fencing team.

== Career ==
Heyman started in the film industry as a production assistant on David Lean's A Passage to India, and in 1986, Heyman became a creative executive at Warner Bros., and he was assistant to Mark Canton. In 1987, he became vice president of United Artists, which joined a series of changes as original production VPs had quit, and subsequently embarked on an independent producing career with his first film, Juice, in 1992, followed by the cult "stoner" film The Stoned Age (1994) and others.

In 1997 Heyman returned to London and founded his own production company, Heyday Films. He has since produced a number of films including the Harry Potter film adaptations. Other notable productions during this time include the 2007 blockbuster I Am Legend and the 2008 films The Boy in the Striped Pyjamas, Is Anybody There?, and Yes Man.

After finishing work on the Harry Potter films, Heyman reunited with Harry Potter and the Prisoner of Azkaban director Alfonso Cuarón to produce the 2013 science fiction thriller Gravity, starring Sandra Bullock and George Clooney. The film grossed more than $700 million worldwide and was nominated for ten Academy Awards including Best Picture, winning seven including Best Director for Cuarón. He also produced the 2013 comedy We're the Millers and the 2014 family film Paddington, for which he was nominated for the Alexander Korda Award for Best British Film.

Heyman produced the Warner Bros. film adaptation of J. K. Rowling's Fantastic Beasts and Where to Find Them, which was released in November 2016, as well as its 2018 sequel.

In 2020, he won the Golden Globe Award for Best Motion Picture – Musical or Comedy for Once Upon a Time in Hollywood with Quentin Tarantino, and both of them were nominated for an Academy Award for Best Picture. In addition, Heyman was also nominated for the same award for Marriage Story with Noah Baumbach.

In 2023, he produced Barbie, which became the highest-grossing Warner Bros. film, surpassing Harry Potter and the Deathly Hallows – Part 2, which he also produced. He was also nominated for an Academy Award for Best Picture for Barbie.

In March 2025, Amazon MGM Studios announced that Heyman and Amy Pascal would oversee the Bond film franchise moving forward and produce future installments in the series through their Pascal Pictures and Heyday Films banners, respectively. In August 2026, it was announced that Heyday Films had signed a first-look deal with Amazon MGM Studios.

== Personal life ==
Heyman lives in Pimlico, London, and is married to interior designer Rose Uniacke (née Batstone). They have one son, Harper Heyman. He is stepfather to four children from her previous marriage.

== Filmography ==
=== Film ===
Year	Film	Notes	Ref.
1992	Juice		
1994	The Stoned Age		
1996	The Daytrippers	Executive producer	
1999	Ravenous		
2001	Harry Potter and the Philosopher's Stone		
2002	Harry Potter and the Chamber of Secrets		
2004	Harry Potter and the Prisoner of Azkaban		
2005	Harry Potter and the Goblet of Fire		
2007	Harry Potter and the Order of the Phoenix		
2007	I Am Legend		
2008	The Boy in the Striped Pyjamas		
2008	Is Anybody There?		
2008	Yes Man		
2009	Harry Potter and the Half-Blood Prince		
2010	Harry Potter and the Deathly Hallows – Part 1		
2011	Harry Potter and the Deathly Hallows – Part 2		
2013	We're the Millers	Executive producer	
2013	Gravity		
2014	Testament of Youth		
2014	Paddington		
2016	The Light Between Oceans		
2016	Fantastic Beasts and Where to Find Them		
2017	Paddington 2		
2018	Fantastic Beasts: The Crimes of Grindelwald		
2019	Once Upon a Time in Hollywood		
2019	Marriage Story		
2020	The Secret Garden		
2022	Fantastic Beasts: The Secrets of Dumbledore		
2022	White Noise		
2023	Barbie		
2023	Wonka		
2025	The Rivals of Amziah King		
2025	Jay Kelly		
2026	Klara and the Sun		
2026	Artificial		
2027	F.A.S.T. †	Post-production	

=== Television ===
Year	Title	Credit	Notes	Ref.
1994	Blind Justice		Television film	
2005	Threshold	Executive producer		
2011	Page Eight		Television film	
2013	The Thirteenth Tale		Television film	
2014	Turks & Caicos	Executive producer	Television film	
2014	Salting the Battlefield	Executive producer	Television film	
2018	The Long Song	Executive producer		
2019	The InBetween	Executive producer		
2019–present	The Capture	Executive producer		
2019–2025	The Adventures of Paddington	Executive producer		
2021	Clickbait	Executive producer	Miniseries	
2024	Apples Never Fall	Executive producer	Miniseries	
2026–present	Harry Potter †	Executive producer	Upcoming series	

As an actor

Year	Film	Role	Notes
1970	Bloomfield	Eldad	
1999	Ravenous	Mr. Janus	
2000	Whipped	Suit	
2007	Harry Potter and the Order of the Phoenix	Healer in Portrait	Uncredited
2011	Harry Potter and the Deathly Hallows – Part 2	Dining Wizard in Painting	Uncredited

== Awards and nominations ==
Key
†	Indicates non-competitive categories

Awards and nominations received by Jessica Lange
Award	Year (Note: The listed year refers to the date of the ceremony.)	Category	Work	Result	Ref.
AACTA Awards	2021	Best Television Drama Series	Clickbait	Nominated	
AACTA International Awards	2014	Best Film	Gravity	Won	
Academy Awards	2014	Best Picture	Gravity	Nominated	
Academy Awards	2020	Best Picture	Marriage Story	Nominated	
Academy Awards	2020	Best Picture	Once Upon a Time in Hollywood	Nominated	
Academy Awards	2024	Best Picture	Barbie	Nominated	
Art Directors Guild Awards	2012	Outstanding Contribution to Cinematic Imagery †	Harry Potter	Won	
British Academy Children's Awards	2002	Feature Film	Harry Potter and the Philosopher's Stone	Nominated	
British Academy Children's Awards	2003	Feature Film	Harry Potter and the Chamber of Secrets	Nominated	
British Academy Children's Awards	2004	Feature Film	Harry Potter and the Prisoner of Azkaban	Won	
British Academy Children's Awards	2006	Feature Film	Harry Potter and the Goblet of Fire	Nominated	
British Academy Children's Awards	2007	Feature Film	Harry Potter and the Order of the Phoenix	Nominated	
British Academy Children's Awards	2011	Feature Film	Harry Potter and the Deathly Hallows – Part 1	Nominated	
British Academy Children's Awards	2011	Feature Film	Harry Potter and the Deathly Hallows – Part 2	Won	
British Academy Children's Awards	2015	Feature Film	Paddington	Won	
British Academy Children's Awards	2018	Feature Film	Paddington 2	Won	
British Academy Film Awards	2002	Outstanding British Film	Harry Potter and the Philosopher's Stone	Nominated	
British Academy Film Awards	2005	Outstanding British Film	Harry Potter and the Prisoner of Azkaban	Nominated	
British Academy Film Awards	2014	Best Film	Gravity	Nominated	
British Academy Film Awards	2014	Outstanding British Film	Gravity	Won	
British Academy Film Awards	2015	Outstanding British Film	Paddington	Nominated	
British Academy Film Awards	2017	Outstanding British Film	Fantastic Beasts and Where to Find Them	Nominated	
British Academy Film Awards	2018	Outstanding British Film	Paddington 2	Nominated	
British Academy Film Awards	2020	Best Film	Once Upon a Time in Hollywood	Nominated	
British Academy Film Awards	2024	Outstanding British Film	Wonka	Nominated	
British Academy Television Awards	2012	Best Single Drama	Page Eight	Nominated	
British Independent Film Awards	2019	Best International Independent Film	Marriage Story	Nominated	
Children's and Family Emmy Awards	2023	Outstanding Preschool Animated Series	The Adventures of Paddington	Nominated	
Daytime Emmy Awards	2021	Outstanding Pre-School Children's Animated Series	The Adventures of Paddington	Won	
Film Independent Spirit Awards	2020	Best Feature	Marriage Story	Nominated	
Gotham Awards	2019	Best Feature	Marriage Story	Won	
Hollywood Music in Media Awards	2023	Music Themed Film, Biopic or Musical †	Wonka	Nominated	
Hugo Awards	2002	Best Dramatic Presentation	Harry Potter and the Philosopher's Stone	Nominated	
International Cinematographers Guild Awards	2012	Motion Pictures Showmanship Award †	—N/a	Won	
Primetime Emmy Awards	2022	Outstanding Variety Special (Pre-Recorded)	Harry Potter 20th Anniversary: Return to Hogwarts	Nominated	
Producers Guild of America Awards	2002	Best Theatrical Motion Picture	Harry Potter and the Philosopher's Stone	Nominated	
Producers Guild of America Awards	2014	Best Theatrical Motion Picture	Gravity	Won (Note: Tied with 12 Years a Slave.)	
Producers Guild of America Awards	2016	David O. Selznick Achievement Award in Theatrical Motion Pictures †	—N/a	Won	
Producers Guild of America Awards	2020	Best Theatrical Motion Picture	Marriage Story	Nominated	
Producers Guild of America Awards	2020	Best Theatrical Motion Picture	Once Upon a Time in Hollywood	Nominated	
Producers Guild of America Awards	2024	Best Theatrical Motion Picture	Barbie	Nominated	

== See also ==
- List of Academy Award winners and nominees from Great Britain
