= The Thirteenth Tale (film) =

2013 British television film

- Genre: Drama
- Based on: The Thirteenth Tale by Diane Setterfield
- Written by: Christopher Hampton
- Directed by: James Kent
- Starring: Olivia Colman; Vanessa Redgrave; Sophie Turner; Steven Mackintosh; Alexandra Roach; Emily Beecham; Tom Goodman-Hill; Michael Jibson; Adam Long; Antonia Clarke; Lizzie Hopley; Madeleine Power; Gordon Winter; Robert Pugh
- Theme music composer: Benjamin Wallfisch
- Country of origin: United Kingdom
- Original language: English

Production
- Producers: David Heyman; Norma Heyman
- Running time: 90 minutes
- Production company: Heyday Films

Original release
- Network: BBC Two; BBC Two HD
- Release: 30 December 2013

The Thirteenth Tale is a British drama television film that first broadcast on BBC Two on 30 December 2013. It is an adaptation of Diane Setterfield's 2006 gothic novel The Thirteenth Tale.

== Plot ==
Biographer Margaret Lea (Olivia Colman) arrives at the country house of famous novelist Vida Winter (Vanessa Redgrave). She has been invited to stay there and help Vida write her biography before she dies of cancer.

Margaret is hesitant, as Vida is known for telling a different story each time she is asked about her background in interviews, so she requests some verifiable information from public record. Vida tells her that her birth name was Adeline March and the local newspapers wrote about a fire that burned down her family home when she was seventeen, of which she bears proof in the form of a key-shaped burn on her palm. With Margaret satisfied that she is telling the truth this time, Vida begins to tell her of the events leading up to the fire.

She grew up at Angelfield, the decaying family estate, with her identical twin sister Emmeline. Their mother Isabelle was distracted by the abuse she suffered at the hands of her unhinged brother, Charlie, and eventually taken away to a mental asylum, so the girls were mostly left to their own devices, becoming unruly and anti-social. The only adult supervision they had, came from the two servants, nicknamed "Missus" and "John-the-dig." A governess is hired, Hester Barrow, who has little effect on the girls' behaviour. Hester speaks to the local doctor about the girls and proposes they are separated as an experiment to see if their behaviour improves. It doesn't, as they are both heartbroken at their forced separation. Adeline will not speak and Emmeline weeps constantly. Hester and the doctor are caught kissing by the doctor's wife, and they both disappear from the village. Vida tells Margaret it's thought they went to America.

By the time the twins were seventeen, they were all alone at Angelfield. Isabelle had died in the asylum and soon after that, Charlie also disappeared. Missus and John-the-dig agreed not to tell anybody, so that they and the girls could continue as they always had. Adeline discovered Charlie's body in the woods, where he had apparently shot himself, but she said nothing to the others. Both Missus and John-the-dig fell to their deaths; Missus over three flights over a banister, and John off an insecure ladder. Though it looked like an accident, Adeline could tell the ladder's safety catch had been tampered with. Fearing what might have happened if she told the authorities they were alone, Adeline pretended Charlie was merely on holiday in Peru. She was assisted in this lie by Ambrose, a boy John had hired to help out after Missus died.

John's death troubles Margaret, as the younger Vida had insisted that Emmeline and Ambrose could not have done it, leaving her as the only possible suspect. Between interviews she goes to explore Angelfield, and is frightened away by someone. She later learns this is Aurelius Love, a harmless man who occasionally camps out at the house. When Vida asks her about her own life, Margaret breaks down and admits that she, too, had an identical twin who was fatally struck by a car as a child, for which Margaret has always blamed herself as much as their mother had.

Margaret hears noises and weeping in the house at night and sees a woman in white roaming the garden, Margaret confronts her and asks what she wants, but her speech is unintelligible. She then sees Vida go to the woman's room and feed her. Margaret then realizes that there weren't two girls at Angelfield, but three. Vida confirms this, revealing that she wasn't Adeline, but presumably the daughter of Charlie, abandoned at the estate by her unknown mother. Missus and John-the-dig kept her existence a secret from the world, as she was probably the product of rape. The real Adeline was dangerously violent and insanely jealous of anyone who got Emmeline's attention. She pushed Missus over the stairs and meddled with John Digence's ladder to make it unsafe for him.

Ambrose was dismissed after Vida discovered that he had made Emmeline pregnant. She gave birth to a baby boy at Angelfield, and it was obvious that Adeline was jealous of him. Vida caught her preparing to burn the newborn boy alive, and managed to sneak him away and later left him on a doorstep in the nearby village, where he was taken in and named Aurelius Love. When Vida returned to the house, the room was ablaze and Emmeline was fighting Adeline, thinking her child was in danger. Vida managed to drag Emmeline out of the room and lock it, leaving Adeline inside. The key-shaped scar on Vida's palm was a result of her locking the door of the room whilst the key was red hot. When the fire brigade arrived, they assumed Vida was Adeline all along.

Emmeline is the woman in white in the garden, and the events of her girlhood had further induced insanity, but Vida has felt honour-bound to care for her despite her illness. Margaret makes a final journey to Angelfield, which is in the process of being demolished. There she finds Aurelius Love, whom Vida's doctor told Margaret used to camp out in the abandoned house. He apologizes for their previous encounter, stating that he did not mean to frighten her. There are police cars outside the house, and Aurelius tells her that a skeleton has been found during the demolition, presumably the remains of Adeline. Margaret returns to Vida's home to hear the end of the story. Moments after finishing, Vida passes away in peace. Margaret decides to stay in the country for a little while.

== Cast ==
- Vanessa Redgrave as Vida Winter, a successful writer who narrates her mysterious and tragic past with her identical twin sister Emmeline, their mentally unbalanced mother and maternal uncle Charlie.
  - Madeleine Power as nine-year-old Adeline and Emmeline March
  - Sophie Turner as teenage Vida, then known as Adeline March
  - Antonia Clarke as teenage Emmeline March
  - Maggie Waller as younger Vida March
- Olivia Colman as Margaret Lea, Vida Winter's biographer
- Alexandra Roach as Hester Barrow, Adeline and Emmeline March's governess
- Janet Amsden as Mrs Dunne, known as the Missus, housekeeper at the Angelfield estate
- Robert Pugh as John Digence, known as John-the-Dig, gardener at the Angelfield estate
- Emily Beecham as Isabelle Angelfield, Adeline and Emmeline's mentally ill mother
- Michael Jibson as Charlie Angelfield, Isabelle's brother who developed an insane obsession with her
- Tom Goodman-Hill as Dr. Mawsley, the town doctor during Adeline and Emmeline's childhood
- Lizzie Hopley as Theodora Mawsley, Dr. Mawsley's wife
- Steven Mackintosh as Dr. Clifton, Vida Winter's doctor
- Adam Long as Ambrose Proctor, an ex-worker at the Angelfield estate
- Gordon Winter as Aurelius Love, an Angelfield village resident

== Production ==
The television film was commissioned for BBC Two by Janice Hadlow, the controller of BBC Two, and Ben Stephenson, the controller of BBC drama commissioning. The script was written by Christopher Hampton, and adapted from Diane Setterfield's gothic novel of the same name. The film was directed by James Kent and produced by both Norma and David Heyman. Filming began in June 2013.

A number of scenes were filmed at Burton Agnes Hall, an Elizabethan manor house in East Yorkshire. Simon Cunliffe-Lister, the building's owner, called the filming a "strange experience": the production supplied its own furniture for the interior scenes, so "it felt as though someone else had moved in". Although the interior scenes were shot in the Red Drawing Room, much of the house was closed to the public during production because any noise from other rooms might affect the filming. Three other locations in Yorkshire were used for filming: Thornton Watlass Hall in North Yorkshire, the Thwaite Mills Industrial Museum in Leeds, and the billiard room of Nostell Priory (a National Trust property) near Wakefield as the setting for the climactic fire.

The Thirteenth Tale runs for ninety minutes. The executive producers are Polly Hill for the BBC and Rosie Alison for Heyday Films, the production company behind The Thirteenth Tale.
