= Rory Morrison =

British radio host

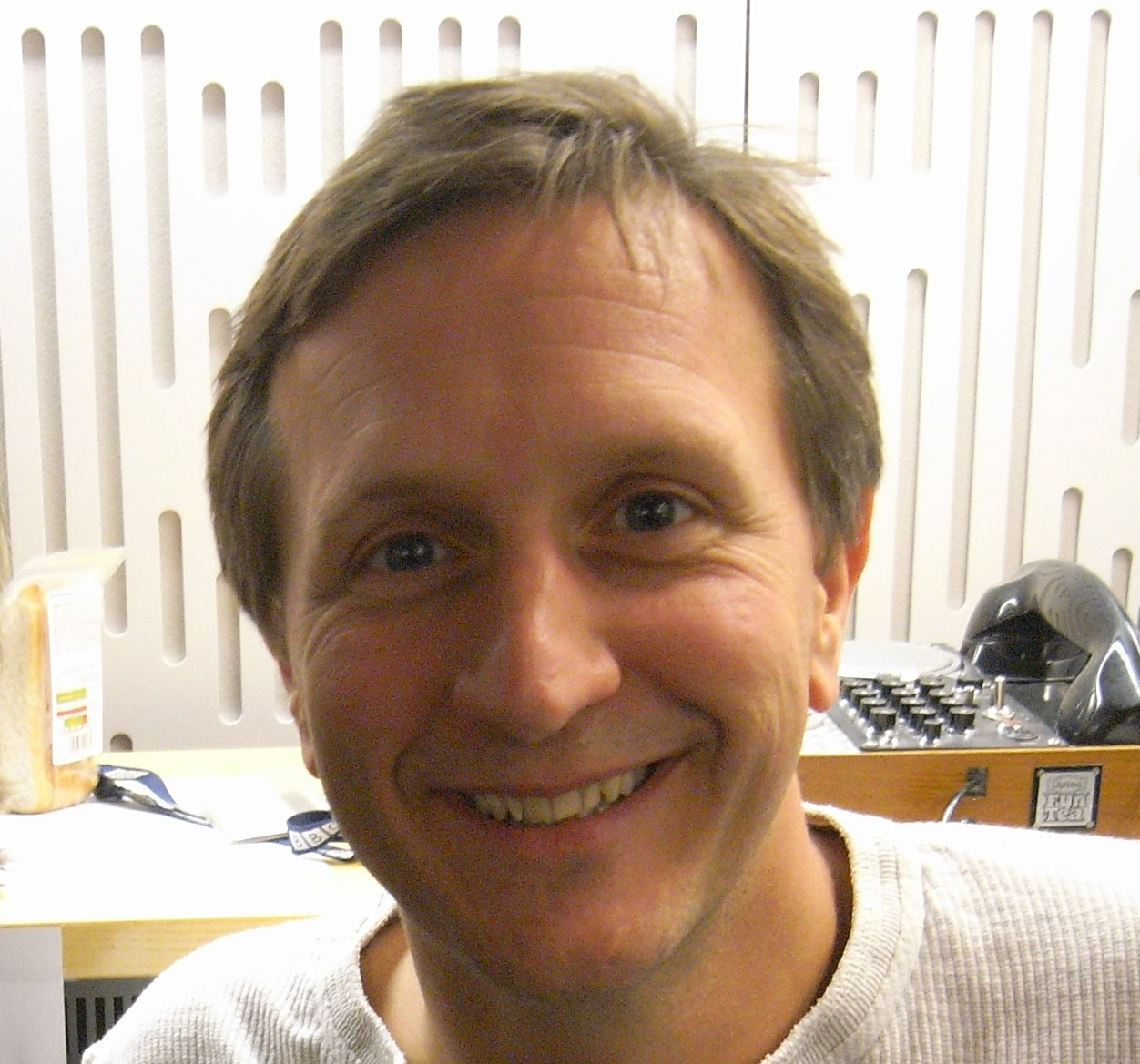
- Rory Morrison in 2011.
- Born: Rory David Morrison; 5 August 1964; London, England
- Died: 11 June 2013 (aged 48); University College London Hospital (UCLH), London, England
- Occupations: Radio newsreader and continuity announcer

Rory David Morrison (5 August 1964 – 11 June 2013) was a newsreader and continuity announcer for BBC Radio 4.

== Early life and education ==
Morrison was born in London in 1964, the eldest of Anne and Bob Morrison's three children. He was brought up in Malvern, Worcestershire, and was educated at The Chase School and Malvern College. At College, he performed well in drama and art, and as a prefect was appointed as Head of House. The English-Speaking Union awarded him a scholarship to Australia. He graduated from Durham University in 1986 with a degree in English Language and Literature.

== Broadcasting career ==
Morrison began his radio broadcasting career as a travel reporter and presenter for Beacon Radio, an independent local radio station covering Shropshire, Wolverhampton and the Black Country. He first joined the BBC in 1990, as the presenter of an afternoon programme on BBC Radio Leeds. He later worked for two other local stations, BBC Radio York and BBC Radio Cleveland. He then moved to the British Forces Broadcasting Service before returning to the BBC as a continuity announcer on Radio 4 in April 1994. He later joined the newsreading team, and regularly appeared on The News Quiz, as a reader for amusing newspaper cuttings during the programme.

== Personal life ==
Morrison married BBC journalist Nikki Jenkins in 1994; the couple met while working for BBC Radio Leeds, and had two children together. Morrison was diagnosed with Waldenström's macroglobulinemia, a rare type of Non-Hodgkin lymphoma, in 2004. After his diagnosis, he became involved in raising money for the Lymphoma Association. In 2008, he took part in a fundraising walk with other radio newsreaders to Herstmonceux Castle in East Sussex, which formerly housed the atomic clocks used to generate the Greenwich Time Signal, or "pips". This event was organised for a special edition of the radio programme Ramblings, broadcast in April as "A Pilgrimage to the Pips". Morrison provided a live outdoor continuity announcement at the end of the programme. Morrison died from lymphoma in the University College London Hospital (UCLH), June 2013.

== Filmography ==
- Page Eight (2011)
