= Universal Content Productions =

American television production company

Universal Content Productions LLC
- Logo used from 2019 until 2026
- Formerly: Universal Cable Productions LLC (2008–2019)
- Type: Division
- Industry: Television production Television syndication
- Predecessor: USA Cable Entertainment
- Founded: June 1, 2008; 18 years ago
- Defunct: June 16, 2026; 5 months ago
- Fate: Merged with Universal International Studios to form Universal Global Television
- Successor: Universal Global Television
- Headquarters: Universal City, California, United States
- Key people: Jennifer Gwartz (EVP)
- Products: Television programs; Podcasts
- Parent: NBCUniversal Cable Entertainment Group (2008–2019); Universal Studio Group (2019–2026)
- Website: nbcuni.com/ucp

Universal Content Productions LLC (UCP), formerly known as Universal Cable Productions LLC, was an American television production company operating within the Universal Studio Group division of NBCUniversal, which is a wholly owned subsidiary of Comcast.

== History ==
=== Universal Cable Productions ===
In July 2008, Universal Cable Productions was split off from Universal Media Studios (UMS) and placed into NBC Universal's NBCU Cable Entertainment division. Originally, UCP was set up to produce shows for USA Network, Syfy, and other cable channels, and was a successor-in-interest to Universal's former cable production division USA Cable Entertainment, which was obtained via Vivendi Universal's acquisition of USA Networks' entertainment assets in 2001 and folded into NBC Universal Television Studio in 2004, straight after NBC merged with Vivendi Universal to form NBC Universal. Cable-produced shows by Universal Media Studios, including shows that were previously produced under the USA Cable Entertainment name, were produced under Universal Cable Productions.

Since then, UCP has moved to producing shows for any network or channel, broadcast or cable. Its NBCU Broadcasting counterpart, Universal Television, has also moved to be a full-service TV studio.

=== Universal Content Productions ===
In early 2019, Universal Cable Productions changed its name to Universal Content Productions to reflect its move into streaming, with production of The Umbrella Academy for Netflix and Peacock. In October 2019, Universal Content Productions, along with Universal Television, was transferred from NBCUniversal Broadcast, Cable, Sports and News to NBCUniversal Content Studios.

UCP announced in November 2019 the 2020 launch of their podcast channel UCP Audio. The studio will produce both scripted and unscripted content with the first scripted podcast from Esmail Corp. It was announced that Dawn Olmstead would leave in order to join Anonymous Content. In February 2021, UCP started an Asian incubator program, with Soo Hugh being one of the first overall deals. In May 2021, UCP Audio was renamed USG Audio. In May 2021, Jennifer Gwartz joined the company after she left 20th Television. In 2021, Elliot Page has signed a deal with the studio.

In June 2026, Universal Content Productions had been merged into Universal Studio Group's fellow international television production division Universal International Studios (whom Universal Content Productions previously co-produced Apples Never Fall with them), with UCP's team being merged with those of UIS and had it renamed into Universal Global Television. Universal Content Productions' development executives, Jennifer Gwarz and Mark Velez, and casting head Steven O’Neill departed from the company while UCP's head of Current Series & EVP, Rebecca Franko, became Universal Global Television's executive Vice-President and its first-look deals being moved to the rebranded merged unit.

== Filmography ==
=== Television series ===
Title	Years	Network	Notes
Law & Order: Criminal Intent	2001–2011	NBC/USA Network	co-production with Wolf Films; UCP co-produced the series from 2008 to 2011 when it moved to NBC's sister channel USA
Monk	2002–2009	USA Network	co-production with Mandeville Films and Touchstone Television; UCP only co-produced the final two seasons.
Battlestar Galactica	2004–2009	Syfy	continued from Universal Television co-production with David Eick Productions, R&D TV and Sky UK; UCP only co-produced the final season Revival of the 1978–1979 series of the same name by Glen A. Larson.
Psych	2006–2014	USA Network	co-production with Pacific Mountain Productions and Tagline Television. UCP only co-produced seasons 3–8.
Eureka	2006–2012	Syfy	continued from Universal Television; UCP only handled the final three seasons.
In Plain Sight	2008–2012	USA Network	co-production with Pirates' Cove Entertainment (seasons 1–2), Tiny Clambake Productions (season 2), McNamara Paper Products (season 3) and Frontier Pictures (seasons 4–5); UCP handled the rest of the series with Universal Media Studios handling the first few episodes.
The Starter Wife	2008	USA Network	co-production with Haypop Productions, 3 Arts Entertainment and McGibbon-Parriott Productions
Royal Pains	2009–2016	USA Network	co-production with 34 Films, Prospect Park and Open 4 Business Productions
Warehouse 13	2009–2014	Syfy	
Caprica	2010	Syfy	
Covert Affairs	2010–2014	USA Network	co-production with Corman & Ord and Hypnotic Films & Television
Being Human	2011–2014	Syfy	co-production.with Muse Entertainment Enterprises; UCP replaced Zodiak Media as the co-production company for the International release of the show's fourth season.
Fairly Legal	2011–2012	USA Network	co-production with Steve Stark Productions, Garfield St. Productions, and Ocko & Company
Suits	2011–2019	USA Network	co-production with Untitled Korsh Company and Hypnotic Films & Television
Necessary Roughness	2011–2013	USA Network	co-production with Still Married Productions and Sony Pictures Television
Alphas	2011–2012	Syfy	co-production with BermanBraun
Against the Wall	2011	Lifetime	co-production with Paid My Dues Productions and Open 4 Business Productions
I Just Want My Pants Back	2011–2012	MTV	co-production with Hypnotic
Battlestar Galactica: Blood & Chrome	2012	Machinima.com	
Defiance	2013–2015	Syfy	co-production with Five & Dime Productions
Playing House	2014–2017	USA Network	co-production with A24, Parham St. Clair Productions and Open 4 Business Productions
Satisfaction	2014–2015	USA Network	co-production with Krasnoff/Foster Entertainment, Rhythm Arts Entertainment and Sony Pictures Television
Dominion	2014–2015	Syfy	co-production with FanFare Productions, Film Afrika, Bold Films, and Sony Pictures Television; Based on the 2010 film Legion by Screen Gems
Ascension	2014	Syfy	co-production with Sea to Sky Entertainment, Levens, Blumhouse Productions and Lionsgate Television
Girlfriends' Guide to Divorce	2014–2018	Bravo	co-production with Tiny Pyro Productions
12 Monkeys	2015–2018	Syfy	co-production with Division Street and Atlas Entertainment; Based on the 1995 film of the same name by Universal Pictures
Dig	2015	USA Network	co-production with Tailwind Productions, G. Raff Productions, The Jackal Group and Keshet International
The Royals	2015–2018	E!	co-production with Mastermind Laboratories, Varsity Pictures and Lionsgate Television
Killjoys	2015–2019	Syfy	co-production with Mendacity Pictures, Bell Media and Temple Street Productions; UCP only handles the International release of the series.
Mr. Robot	2015–2019	USA Network	co-production with Anonymous Content and Esmail Corp
Difficult People	2015–2017	Hulu	co-production with Paper Kite Productions, 3 Arts Entertainment and Jax Media
Childhood's End	2015	Syfy	co-production with Michael De Luca Productions, Monastic Productions and Weed Road Pictures
The Magicians	2015–2020	Syfy	co-production with McNamara Moving Company, Man Sewing Dinosaur and Groundswell Productions
Colony	2016–2018	USA Network	co-production with Carlton Cuse Productions, (season 1) Cuse Productions (season 2), Genre Arts (season 3) and Legendary Television
Hunters	2016	Syfy	co-production with Gangtackle Entertainment and Valhalla Entertainment
Queen of the South	2016–2021	USA Network	co-production with Frequency Films, Friendly Films, Skeeter Rosenbaum Productions, Touchstone Television (seasons 1–4) and 20th Television (season 5)
HarmonQuest	2016–2019	Seeso/VRV	co-production with Harmonious Claptrap and Starburns Industries
Falling Water	2016–2018	USA Network	co-production with Gangtackle Productions and Valhalla Entertainment
Aftermath	2016	Syfy	co-production with Bell Media and Halfire Entertainment
Channel Zero	2016–2018	Syfy	co-production with Eat The Cat and UTMK Limited
Eyewitness	2016	USA Network	co-production with Adi TV Studios
Shooter	2016–2018	USA Network	co-production with Leverage Entertainment, Closest to the Hole Productions and Paramount Television; Based on the 2007 film of the same name by Paramount Pictures
Incorporated	2016–2017	Syfy	co-production with Pearl Street Films, Algorithm Entertainment and CBS Television Studios
Imposters	2017–2018	Bravo	co-production with Villa Walk Productions and Riverrun Films
The Arrangement	2017–2018	E!	co-production with Sneaky Pictures, Inc., All3Media America and Main Event Media
Blood Drive	2017	Syfy	co-production with Strong & Dobbs
The Sinner	2017–2021	USA Network	co-production with Iron Ocean
Damnation	2017–2018	USA Network	co-production with No Possum Productions, Entertainment 360, Turnpike and Netflix
Happy!	2017–2019	Syfy	co-production with Original Film, Littleton Road and Hypernormal (season 2); Netflix distributed the series in other countries
Unsolved	2018	USA Network	co-production with HemingwayTaylor
Impulse	2018–2019	YouTube Premium	co-production with Hypnotic
The Purge	2018–2019	USA Network	co-production with Blumhouse Television, Platinum Dunes, Man in a Tree Productions and Racket Squad Productions (season 1); Based on the 2013 film of the same name and its sequels by Universal Pictures
Dirty John	2018–2020	Bravo/USA Network	co-production with Atlas Entertainment, Los Angeles Times Studios and Nutmegger
Homecoming	2018–2020	Amazon Prime Video	co-production with Amazon Studios, Anonymous Content, Esmail Corp, Gimlet Media, Red Om Films and We Here At
Deadly Class	2019	Syfy	co-production with Gozie AGBO, Chipmunk Hill, Getaway Entertainment, Giant Generator, 2 Miles Entertainment and Sony Pictures Television
The Act	2019	Hulu	co-production with Eat the Cat and Writ Large
The Umbrella Academy	2019–2024	Netflix	co-production with Dark Horse Entertainment, Borderline Entertainment (seasons 1–2) and Irish Cowboy (seasons 3–4)
Pearson	2019	USA Network	co-production with Untitled Korsh Company, Hypnotic Films & Television and Major Migraine, Inc.
Treadstone	2019–2020	USA Network	co-production with Captivate Entertainment, Tailwind Productions and Imperative Entertainment
Dare Me	2019–2020	USA Network	co-production with Megan Abbott, Drowning Girl Productions, Fair Harbour Productions and Film 44
Briarpatch	2020	USA Network	co-production with Anonymous Content, Voodoo Ltd., Esmail Corp and Paramount Television Studios
The At Home Variety Show Featuring Seth MacFarlane	2020	Peacock	co-production with Jax Media and Fuzzy Door Productions
Brave New World	2020	Peacock	co-production with Amblin Television and David Wiener
A Wilderness of Error	2020	FX	co-production with Truth Media, Rachael Horovitz Prods., Blumhouse Television and FXP
Resident Alien	2021–2025	Syfy/USA Network	co-production with Jocko Productions, Amblin Television and Dark Horse Entertainment
Punky Brewster	2021	Peacock	co-production with Armogida Brothers Productions, Main Event Media and Universal Television; Remake of the 1984–88 series of the same name by NBC Productions
Dr. Death	2021–2023	Peacock	co-production with Littleton Road Productions, Escape Artists and Wondery
Dr Death: The Undoctored Story	2021	Peacock	co-production with Wondery and Peacock Media Productions
One of Us Is Lying	2021–2022	Peacock	co-production with 5MM
Chucky	2021–2024	Syfy; USA Network	co-production with Pheidippides, David Kirschner Productions and Eat The Cat; Based on the 1988 film Child's Play by United Artists, as well as its sequels by Universal Pictures and Rogue Pictures
Joe vs. Carole	2022	Peacock	co-production with Matchbox Pictures and Wondery
The Girl from Plainville	2022	Hulu	co-production with Happy Friday Productions, Lewellen Pictures, Echo Lake Entertainment and Littleton Road Productions
Gaslit	2022	Starz	co-production with Esmail Corp., Anonymous Content, Red Om Films, and Slate
Candy	2022	Hulu	co-production with Eat The Cat, Iron Ocean, Boss Clown Productions and 20th Television
Angelyne	2022	Peacock	co-production with Esmail Corp, Compostition 8, The Hollywood Reporter and Anonymous Content
Queer as Folk	2022	Peacock	co-production with Red Production Company, All3Media International, Piece of Work and Furnace Room Films
The Resort	2022	Peacock	co-production with Esmail Corp, Anonymous Content, Quadraturin and All for Ramonez
The End Is Nye	2022	Peacock	co-production with Universal Television Alternative Studio, Fuzzy Door Productions and Beetlecod Productions
Quantum Leap	2022–2024	NBC	co-production with Universal Television, Dean Georgaris Entertainment 2.0 and Quinn's House
A Friend of the Family	2022	Peacock	co-production with Eat the Cat
Based on a True Story	2023–2024	Peacock	co-production with Overlook Productions and Aggregate Films
Scott Pilgrim Takes Off	2023	Netflix	co-production with Marc Platt Productions, Complete Fiction, Faust Av and Science Saru
Ted	2024–2026	Peacock	co-production with Fuzzy Door Productions and MRC Television; Based on the 2012 film of the same name by Seth MacFarlane
Apples Never Fall	2024	Peacock	co-production with Matchbox Pictures, Call Me Mel Productions Inc., Universal International Studios and Heyday Television
Teacup	2024	Peacock	co-production with Parkside Baroo, Inc., Atomic Monster and Population
Hysteria!	2024	Peacock	co-production with Good Fear Content, GoldDay, Drive–Thru Productions and Cat Dead, Details Later, Inc.
Suits LA	2025	NBC	co-production with Untitled Korsh Company and Hypnotic Films & Television
Long Bright River	2025	Peacock	co-production with Original Film, Pascal Pictures, Black Mass Productions and Sony Pictures Television
Devil in Disguise: John Wayne Gacy	2025	Peacock	co-production with NBC News Studios and Littleton Road Productions; Based on the documentary of the same name by NBC News Studios
The Copenhagen Test	2025	Peacock	co-production with Atomic Monster and Bully Pile Productions
The 'Burbs	2026	Peacock	co-production with Fuzzy Door Productions, Imagine Entertainment and Out of the Blue Productions; Based on the 1989 film of the same name by Joe Dante
Cape Fear	2026	Apple TV	co-production with Eat the Cat and Amblin Television; Based on the 1991 film of the same name by Universal Pictures
The Five-Star Weekend	2026	Peacock	co-production with Dinner Party Productions

=== Podcasts ===
Title	Network	Original run	Notes
The End Up	UCP Audio	Upcoming	near-future scripted podcast produced by Esmail Corp.
House of Prayer	UCP Audio	Upcoming	unscripted podcast about an investigation into an alleged cult
Untitled troubled-teen industry podcast	UCP Audio	Upcoming	unscripted podcast about a lost teen takes a look at the business of therapeutic schools and their links to politicians, Hollywood and a cults

== See also ==
- USA Cable Entertainment, Universal's former cable production division
