= Ravenous (1999 film) =

1999 film

- Theatrical release poster
- Directed by: Antonia Bird
- Written by: Ted Griffin
- Produced by: Adam Fields; David Heyman
- Starring: Guy Pearce; Robert Carlyle; Jeremy Davies; Jeffrey Jones; John Spencer; Stephen Spinella; Neal McDonough; David Arquette
- Cinematography: Anthony B. Richmond
- Edited by: Neil Farrell
- Music by: Michael Nyman; Damon Albarn
- Production companies: Heyday Films; Fox 2000 Pictures
- Distributed by: 20th Century Fox
- Release dates: March 19, 1999 (United States); September 10, 1999 (United Kingdom)
- Running time: 100 minutes
- Countries: United Kingdom; United States; Mexico
- Language: English
- Budget: $12 million
- Box office: $2 million

Ravenous is a 1999 black comedy horror western film directed by Antonia Bird and written by Ted Griffin. Set in the 1840s, the film stars Guy Pearce as John Boyd, a US Army captain who is exiled to a remote military outpost in the Sierra Nevadas, where he and his colleagues encounter a sadistic cannibal, played by Robert Carlyle. The film also stars Jeffrey Jones, David Arquette, Jeremy Davies, Stephen Spinella, Neal McDonough, and John Spencer in his final film role.

Griffin's screenplay combines elements from the Donner Party and that of Alfred Packer, the real-life "Colorado Cannibal" who survived by eating five companions after becoming snowbound in the San Juan Mountains in the 1870s. An international co-production between United Kingdom, United States and Mexico, Ravenous had a troubled production history. Issues over budget and shooting schedules were still ongoing when filming was about to start in Slovakia. After the original director Milcho Manchevski was fired three weeks into production, he was replaced by Bird at the suggestion of Carlyle. The score was composed by Michael Nyman and Damon Albarn, who used period-accurate instruments and utilized several minimal music techniques.

Released by 20th Century Fox in the spring of 1999, Ravenous was a box-office bomb, grossing $2 million against a $12 million budget. However, despite initial reception being mixed when released, it has since garnered a reputation as a cult film.

== Plot ==
During the Mexican–American War, US Army second lieutenant John Boyd plays dead as his unit is destroyed by Mexican troops. Unaware Boyd is still alive, the Mexican troops send him on a cart of American dead to the Mexican headquarters. Throughout this journey, blood drips into Boyd's mouth, giving him the strength to capture the headquarters. His heroism earns him a promotion to captain, but Boyd's superior General Slauson sends Boyd to Fort Spencer, a remote military outpost in the Sierra Nevada under the command of Colonel Hart, as punishment for perceived cowardice.

The traumatized Boyd joins the fort's seven-man garrison. A stranger named Colqhoun arrives and tells them a story of how his wagon train became lost in the mountains due to the carelessness of their 'guide', a frontiersman named Colonel Ives who had blatantly misrepresented his experience. After taking refuge in a cave and eating their horses, pack-animals, belts and shoes, the group eventually resorted to cannibalism to avoid starvation. Colqhoun admits he eventually fled the cave and the group when Ives' particularly voracious appetite drove him to begin actively murdering the living members of the group for more food. The fort assembles a rescue party to search for survivors; just before they leave, the fort's Indian scout, George, warns them of the Wendigo myth: anyone who consumes the flesh of a human absorbs their strength and vitality but becomes a demon cursed by an insatiable hunger for more human flesh.

Finding the cave that had sheltered Colqhoun's party, Boyd and Reich venture inside and discover piled human belongings and evidence of the camp. Inside a deeper crevice, Reich discovers five skeletons strung upside down and a Colonel's uniform with the name 'Ives' on it, revealing that it was in fact Colqhoun who had murdered and consumed his five companions. Outside, Colqhoun kills the rescue party one by one, leaving Boyd the sole survivor. He breaks his leg when he escapes by jumping off a cliff to escape and hides in a covered pit next to the body of Reich. Boyd stays in the pit for the next few nights to recover, attempting to eat roots to survive before eventually giving in and consuming some of Reich's flesh. Meanwhile, Colqhoun butchers and devours the other members of the rescue party.

Eventually, Boyd limps back to Fort Spencer delirious and plagued by cravings for human flesh. The soldiers who never met Colqhoun do not believe Boyd's wild tale and a second expedition to the cave finds neither bodies nor any trace of Colqhoun. A temporary commander is assigned to the fort and turns out to be Colqhoun, presenting himself as the murdered Colonel Ives. Boyd's fellow soldiers refuse to believe that "Ives" is the killer, especially since he bears no sign of the wounds supposedly inflicted on him during the fight at the cave.

That evening, Ives privately tells Boyd that he used to suffer from tuberculosis. After an Indian scout informed him of the Wendigo myth, he killed and ate the scout, which cured his illness and revitalized him. He now plans to use the fort as a base to cannibalize other passing travelers headed westward and wants Boyd, who is fighting his cannibalistic cravings, to join him.

Boyd is suspected of murder after Private Cleaves mysteriously dies. He is incarcerated and watches helplessly as Major Knox is murdered by the real killer; Colonel Hart, whom everyone believed to be dead. Ives reveals he saved Hart by feeding Hart his own comrades and now Hart too is addicted to human flesh. Frustrated by Boyd's stubbornness, Ives critically wounds him and forces Boyd to make a choice: once again consume human flesh or die. Eventually Boyd gives in and eats a stew made out of Major Knox, healing his injuries.

Rather than join the two men in their attempt to convert General Slauson, who is shortly due to arrive at the fort, Boyd convinces Hart to free him so he can kill Ives. Hart complies but asks that he be killed as he no longer wants to live as a cannibal. Boyd and Ives wound each other but do not die easily due to their recuperative powers. Finally, in an outhouse, Boyd forces Ives into a bear trap and springs it, pinning them both together. Ives expires first, and Boyd refuses to save himself by eating Ives' body and dies on top of his adversary. Martha, George's sister, returns to the fort and finds the bodies of both Ives and Boyd, closes the door, and leaves the fort alone on foot. Slauson eventually arrives. While his aide looks around the dilapidated fort, Slauson tastes the stew that was left simmering on the fire, and savors the taste.

== Cast ==
- Guy Pearce as Captain John Boyd
- Robert Carlyle as F.W. Colqhoun / Colonel Ives
- David Arquette as Private Cleaves
- Jeremy Davies as Private Toffler
- Jeffrey Jones as Colonel Hart
- John Spencer as General Slauson
- Stephen Spinella as Major Knox
- Neal McDonough as Private Reich
- Joseph Runningfox (credited as Joseph Running Fox) as George
- Sheila Tousey as Martha
- Bill Brochtrup as Lindus
- Fernando Becerril as Mexican Commander
- Gabriel Berthier as Mexican Commander
- Pedro Altamirano as Mexican Commander
- Damián Delgado as Mexican Grenadier
- Tim Van Rellim as Mr. MacCready
- Miezi Sungu as Jones
- David Heyman as Mr. Janus

== Production ==
=== Development ===
The script for Ravenous was one of three screenplays written by Ted Griffin that he sold to a studio in a week. The script was loosely inspired by the Donner Party, as well as the story of Alfred Packer, an American prospector and Union army veteran who murdered a group of traveling companions, ate them and claimed to law enforcement that he did so out of self-defense and survival. In September 1997, Macedonian director Milcho Manchevski was announced to direct the film for Fox 2000.

=== Filming ===
The film was shot on location in the Tatra Mountains in Slovakia and Durango in Mexico. One week before production, Manchevski reportedly submitted new storyboards, which would have required an additional two weeks of shooting. Fox 2000 eventually agreed to an additional week, with complaints that Manchevski had refused to attend production meetings with the producers. Manchevski claimed Fox 2000 executive Laura Ziskin micromanaged the production by vetoing his chosen technicians and casting against his wishes.

Shooting was delayed on the first day, as Manchevski and the production were still negotiating over the production budget and shooting schedule. As filming commenced, Manchevski says Ziskin sent him notes on the rushes "every day", complaining about the amount of dirt on the costumes and the number of closeups. Screenwriter Ted Griffin was on hand for "constant rewrites" during the shooting.

Three weeks into filming, Ziskin arrived to the set to dismiss Manchevski, and have him replaced with director Raja Gosnell. Though Manchevski left the production, the cast was said to have been unhappy with Gosnell, and were rumored to have held a mutiny on the set. Robert Carlyle then recommended Antonia Bird, his frequent collaborator and business partner, to take over. Bird had a previous business relationship with Ziskin, and admired the script.

Following ten days of negotiations, Bird arrived in Prague to take over the production. She, too, would criticize the circumstances under which the filming was to take place, describing the allocated studio space as "horrible" and the scheduling of the shoot "manipulative". She also went on to say that her predecessor, Manchevski, should not be blamed for the problematic production.

=== Post-production ===
Bird suggested the final theatrical cut had elements introduced without her approval, such as the voiceover narration and explanatory quotes. Bird felt these elements were superfluous, and expressed a desire in recutting the film for the European market.

== Themes ==
The film uses its period setting and the act of cannibalism to critique manifest destiny, colonialism and capitalism. Said Bird: "As a European, observing early Californian history and making a film about that — I kind of believe Europeans were responsible for a lot of stuff that happened here. Robert Carlyle's character represents that. The Europeans practiced genocide. I think the good things about America — we're (Europeans) not responsible for."

Though Bird said the film is "more about social misfits than the whole seductive nature of power", she stated, "I would like to think that someone who enjoyed it (Ravenous) only as gallows humor would start to think. The metaphor of power and a society where we're encouraged to be competitive is, to me, not a great society." Thus, cannibalism can be seen as a critique of "contemporary America where the way of life seems to be more and more a matter of consume or be consumed". In addition, she said that cannibalism can be interpreted as an addiction to drugs or a yearning for eternal youth, which manifests in modern-day Western society as the consumption of junk food or the obsession with plastic surgery. "Robert Carlyle's character is the ultimate drug pusher and Guy Pearce's character is the ultimate junkie," said Bird.

== Soundtrack ==
The score was composed by Michael Nyman and Damon Albarn of the band Blur. Instruments used for the score were from the film's historical period and included the violin, guitar, banjo, jaw harp and squeeze box. Nyman and Albarn reworked versions of American patriotic songs and old Methodist hymns (including those of Stephen Foster, known as the "father of American music") to be intentionally out of tune and off-kilter.

== Release ==
Ravenous opened on March 19, 1999, in the United States in 1,040 cinemas. The film opened in the United Kingdom later that year, on September 10, 1999.

=== Home media ===
20th Century Fox Home Entertainment released Ravenous on DVD in October 1999. Scream Factory released a Blu-ray edition on June 3, 2014.

== Reception ==
=== Box office ===
Ravenous earned $1,040,727 over its opening weekend in the United States, finishing eighteenth for the weekend. The film went on to gross $2,062,405 in North America. It was regarded as a box-office bomb, failing to recoup its $12 million budget.

=== Critical response ===
On Rotten Tomatoes, the film has a 52% rating based on 66 reviews and an average rating of 6/10. The site's critical consensus reads: "Ravenous tries bringing cannibal horror into an Old West setting, ending up with an uneven blend that will fail to satisfy most fans of either genre". Metacritic, which uses a weighted average, assigned the film a score of 46 out of 100, based on 23 critics, indicating "mixed or average" reviews. Audiences polled by CinemaScore gave the film an average grade of "D" on an A+ to F scale.

Roger Ebert rated the film three out of four stars, and stated that it was "the kind of movie where you savor the texture of the filmmaking, even when the story strays into shapeless gore." He noted the film is "more interested in atmosphere than plot", but conceded Bird "shows she's a real filmmaker...and has an instinct for scenes like the one where a visiting general savors the broth of a bubbling stew". Ebert concluded that Ravenous "is clever in the way it avoids most of the cliches of the vampire movie by using cannibalism, and most of the cliches of the cannibal movie by using vampirism. It serves both dishes with new sauces." Janet Maslin of The New York Times reviewed the film negatively, and said: "a potentially strong cast makes its way in deadly earnest through material that's often better suited to a Monty Python skit".

Audiences, particularly in the US, were said to be confused about the tone of the film, which combines various genres such as horror, black comedy, satire and film noir. Said Carlyle: "Because the subject matter is so gruesome and the visuals are so distasteful, there are going to be people who are not going to be too happy to watch this one. They've said all along that it's going to be a hard sell. It's a period piece. I think that's why there's humor in the film. I like the fact that it's unusual and that it is hard to place. I think that's a good thing — probably not for the people who are trying to make their money back."

The film has garnered cult status since its release. In a retrospective review in Rolling Stone, David Ehrlich wrote, "Ravenous butchers the fantasy that the United States is a banquet with room for everyone at the table. This is a landscape where 'manifest destiny' becomes a handy euphemism for all sorts of horrors, and a reminder that progress was never possible without savagery; the frontier was the Hunger Games, and it always has been. That may not be breaking news, but the film isn't interested in telling you something that you don't know, only showing it to you in a way so giddy and gruesome that you'll never be able to forget it."

== See also ==
- Bone Tomahawk, a 2015 Western cannibal horror film
- Cannibal! The Musical, a 1996 black comedy musical that also tells the Packer story
- Cannibalism in popular culture

== Sources ==
- Aquila, Robert (2015). The Sagebrush Trail: Western Movies and Twentieth-Century America. Tucson, Arizona: University of Arizona Press. ISBN 978-0-816-53154-7.
- Grant, Barry Keith (2011). Shadows of Doubt: Negotiations of Masculinity in American Genre Films. Detroit, Michigan: Wayne State University Press. ISBN 978-0-814-33457-7.
- Hutchings, Peter (2009). The A to Z of Horror Cinema. Lanham, Maryland: Scarecrow Press. ISBN 978-0-810-87050-5.
