= Ewen Bremner =

Scottish actor

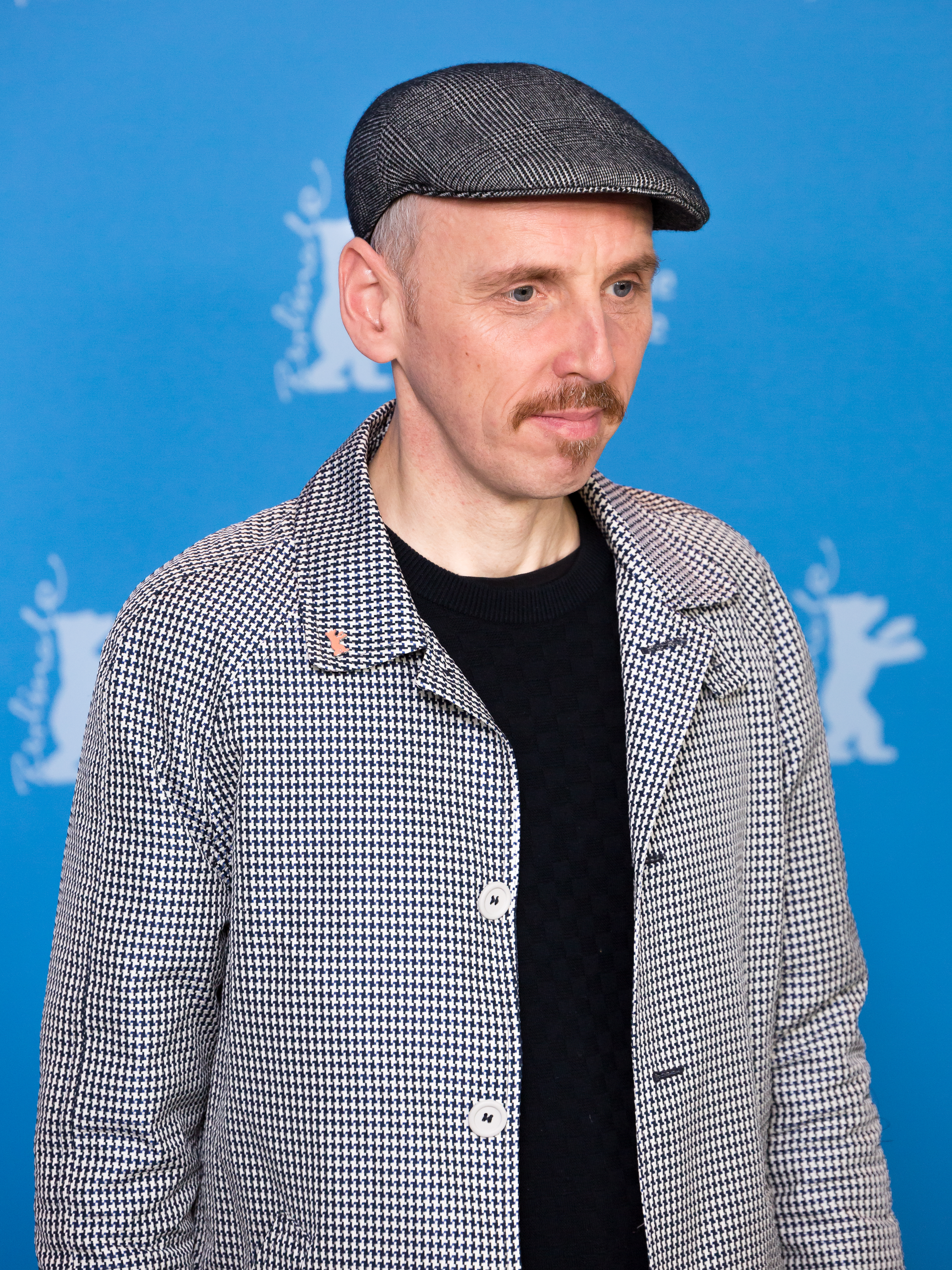
- Bremner at the Berlinale 2017
- Born: Edinburgh, Scotland
- Years active: 1985–present
- Children: 1

Ewen Bremner is a Scottish actor. His roles have included Shawn Nelson in Black Hawk Down, Julien in Julien Donkey-Boy and Daniel "Spud" Murphy in Trainspotting and its 2017 sequel T2 Trainspotting.

== Early life and education ==
Ewen Bremner was born in Edinburgh, the son of two art teachers. He attended Davidson's Mains Primary School and Portobello High School. He originally wanted to be a circus clown, but was offered a chance at screen acting by television director Richard D. Brooks. One of his first notable roles was as a Glasgow schoolboy in Charles Gormley's Heavenly Pursuits (1986). He also played the lead in the BBC Scotland feature-length adaptation of the William McIlvanney short story "Dreaming" (1990).

== Career ==
Bremner portrayed Spud in Danny Boyle's film adaptation of Irvine Welsh's 1993 novel Trainspotting, In the 1994 stage version of Trainspotting, Bremner played the lead role of Mark Renton, the role played by Ewan McGregor in the 1996 film. In 2000 he would later play Mullet, a street thug in Guy Ritchie's Snatch. He has played supporting roles in blockbusters such as Pearl Harbor, Black Hawk Down, Alien Vs Predator, Death at a Funeral, Great Expectations.

In 2017, he produced the short film No Song to Sing. Bremner reprised his role as Daniel “Spud” Murphy in the sequel T2 Trainspotting. He gained enthusiastic reviews for his performance from critics whilst receiving the BAFTA Scotland award for Best Actor in 2017, nominated alongside his fellow co-stars Ewan McGregor and Robert Carlyle

Bremner played WW1 soldier Charlie, a PTSD stricken marksman in 2017’s Wonder Woman.

Bremner plays a lead role as Tommy in the 2025 ITV series Coldwater.

== Personal life ==
He has one daughter, with actress Marcia Rose, whom he met during the filming of Skin.

== Filmography ==
=== Film ===
Year	Film	Role	Notes
1986	Heavenly Pursuits	Stevie Deans	
1993	Naked	Archie	
1994	Prince of Jutland	Frovin	
1995	Judge Dredd	Junior Angel	
1996	Trainspotting	Daniel "Spud" Murphy	
1998	The Acid House	Colin 'Coco' Bryce	Segment: "The Acid House"
1999	Julien Donkey-Boy	Julien	
2000	Paranoid	Gordon	
2000	Snatch	Mullet	
2001	Black Hawk Down	SPC Shawn Nelson	
2001	Pearl Harbor	Red	
2003	Skagerrak	Gabriel	
2003	16 Years of Alcohol	Jake	
2003	The Rundown	Declan	
2004	The Reckoning	Simon Damian	
2004	Around the World in 80 Days	Inspector Fix	
2004	Alien vs. Predator	Graeme Miller	
2005	Match Point	Inspector Dowd	
2006	Marvelous	Lars	
2007	Death at a Funeral	Justin	
2007	Hallam Foe	Andy	
2008	Fool's Gold	Alfonz	
2008	Faintheart	Julian	
2010	You Will Meet a Tall Dark Stranger	Henry Strangler	
2011	Perfect Sense	James	
2011	Page Eight	Rollo Maverley	
2012	Great Expectations	Wemmick	
2013	Jack the Giant Slayer	Wicke	
2013	Snowpiercer	Andrew	
2014	The Veil of Twilight	Rabbi Dunbar	
2014	Exodus: Gods and Kings	Expert	
2014	Get Santa	PC Finkerton	
2017	T2 Trainspotting	Daniel "Spud" Murphy	BAFTA Scotland Award for Best Actor
2017	Wonder Woman	Charlie	
2017	Mary and the Witch's Flower	Flanagan	Voice role, English dub
2017	American Renegades	Jim Rainey	
2019	First Cow	Lloyd	
2021	Creation Stories	Alan McGee	
2022	Freedom's Path	Silas	
2026	The Dog Stars	Crossbow Hunter	
TBA	As Deep as the Grave	Sylvanus G. Morley	Post-production

=== Television ===
Year	Film	Role	Notes
1990	Taggart	Jason	Episode: "Love Knot"
1990	Forget About Me	Broke	Television film
1990	Screen Two	Sammy Nelson	Episode: "Dreaming"
1994	A Touch of Frost	Gordon Hicks	Episode: "Nothing to Hide"
1994	The Inspector Alleyn Mysteries	Walter McNabb	Episode: "Dead Water"
1994–1996	The Bill	Paul Tovey / Sean Lewis	2 episodes
1997	Harry Enfield and Chums	various characters	5 episodes
2001	Langt fra Las Vegas	John Twain D'Wain	Episode: "One On the Region's Suit"
2004	Coming Up	Johnny	Episode: "The Baader Meinhoff Gang Show"
2005	Elizabeth I	King James VI	Miniseries
2006	The Virgin Queen	Sir James Melville	Miniseries
2006	The Lost Room	Harold Stritzke	Episode: "The Comb and the Box"
2008	My Name Is Earl	Raynard	Episode: "Reading is a Funda Mental Case"
2009	Spooks	Ryan Baisley	1 episode
2009	The Day of the Triffids	Walter Strange	Part One
2010	Strike Back	Gerald Baxter	2 episodes
2010	Dive	Stewart	Television film
2010	Moving On	Adam	Episode: "Malaise"
2012	Blackout	Jerry Durrans	Miniseries
2012	Accused	Frank Best	Episode: "Tina's Story"
2014	Turks & Caicos	Rollo Maverley	Television film
2014	Salting the Battlefield	Rollo Maverley	Television film
2014	A Poet in New York	John Malcolm Brinnin	Television film
2015	Banished	Reverend Johnson	Miniseries
2016	Houdini and Doyle	Sherlock Holmes	Episode: "Bedlam"
2017	Will	Richard Topcliffe	Miniseries
2022	House of the Dragon	Assassin	Uncredited cameo, 1 episode
2022–2023	Our Flag Means Death	Buttons	10 episodes
2025	Coldwater	Tommy	Miniseries

== Awards and nominations ==
Year	Award	Category	Nominee(s)	Result	Ref.
2017	BAFTA Scotland	Best Actor	T2 Trainspotting	Won	
2022	Peabody Awards	Entertainment	Our Flag Means Death	Nominated	
