= Another Me (2013 film) =

2013 psychological drama film

- Spanish theatrical release poster
- Directed by: Isabel Coixet
- Written by: Isabel Coixet
- Based on: Another Me by Catherine MacPhail
- Produced by: Mariela Besuievsky; Nicole Carmen-Davis; Rebekah Gilbertson
- Starring: Sophie Turner; Jonathan Rhys Meyers; Claire Forlani; Rhys Ifans; Gregg Sulkin
- Cinematography: Jean-Claude Larrieu
- Edited by: Elena Ruiz
- Music by: Michael Price
- Production companies: Rainy Day Films; Tornasol Films; Fox International Productions
- Distributed by: 20th Century Fox
- Release dates: 15 November 2013 (Rome Film Festival); 27 June 2014 (Spain)
- Running time: 86 minutes
- Countries: Spain; United Kingdom
- Language: English

Another Me (Spanish: Mi otro yo) is a 2013 psychological thriller drama film directed by Isabel Coixet and starring Sophie Turner (in her film debut), Jonathan Rhys Meyers, Claire Forlani, Rhys Ifans, and Gregg Sulkin. It is based on the 2003 novel of the same name by Catherine MacPhail. The film had its world premiere at the Rome Film Festival on 15 November 2013. The film was released in Spain on 27 June 2014 and in the United States on 22 August 2014.

== Plot ==
While on vacation, Fay's father (Rhys Ifans) is diagnosed with multiple sclerosis. Returning to school, Fay (Sophie Turner) is cast in the school production of Macbeth as Lady Macbeth alongside Drew (Gregg Sulkin), a boy whom she likes. During the first rehearsal, Fay is nervous and keeps forgetting her lines. Her teacher, John (Jonathan Rhys Meyers) advises her to look at Roman Polanski's 1971 version of Macbeth for inspiration. Fay goes to the school library to pick up a copy and, while there, is terrified as lights begin to flicker on and off. She hears the sound of someone chasing her. Shortly after she runs off, she is found by a group of her friends who have seen and heard nothing.

Fay begins to see a girl who looks similar to her, passing by the street. When her mother goes out, telling the family she is going out with friends, Fay sees her getting into a car and kissing a man who is not her father, while a girl who looks like Fay approaches the car. Later a neighbour tells Fay that she saw her walking down the stairs of their building. When Fay denies it was her, her neighbour says that she would never mistake Fay for anyone else because of her distinctive long red hair. Fay chases after the girl but finds no one. Returning home, she cuts her hair into a misshapen bob. At school, Fay frightens her friends by insisting that she is being stalked by a Doppelgänger who her friends suggest may be her understudy and rival Monica who similarly has long red hair. After her mother picks her up from school, Fay confesses her paranoia about being stalked by a twin, and her mother admits that Fay was a twin but that she had a late-term miscarriage with her sister, Layla.

After a successful rehearsal, Fay goes on a date with Drew. Returning home, she finds her father collapsed on the floor. Helping him into his wheelchair, she sees that he had been looking at a sonogram of her and her sister. In school the next day, Fay sees her drama teacher, John, pulling into the parking lot and recognizes his car as the one belonging to the man she saw her mother kissing. When he approaches her later to ask why she never waved back to him earlier that morning in the school playground, Fay denies ever being there and suspects it is the double she has been seeing around.

In the school courtyard, she sees that Monica has cut her hair in a direct imitation of her hairstyle and attacks her, believing that she is impersonating her. In the principal's office when Fay accuses Monica of impersonating her, the principal (Leonor Watling) informs her that it couldn't have been her in the schoolyard as she came in early. Fay proceeds to grab scissors and cut her hand in order to create a distinctive scar so that people will be able to differentiate between her and her double.

When her mother picks her up from school, she confronts her about the affair she is having, and her mother promises to break it off. Drew then comes to visit her, and the two kiss. For a brief while Fay is content as her double disappears, and her parents seem more reconciled. She and Drew grow closer and have sex. However, after her father receives bad medical news, her mother reconciles with John. Walking home with Drew, Fay sees John's car smashed into a tree and the police officer on the scene tells her that a girl threw a rock at his car window, causing him to have an accident but her mother escaped uninjured. Fay believes that her twin attacked the car. Fay decides to take the day off from school and goes to visit John in the hospital. The next day at school Drew thanks Fay for a post coital picture of them he found in his locker. During rehearsals the principal taking over for John tells Fay to say the lines the same way she did the day before. When Fay tells her she wasn't there, everyone tells her they saw her there.

Fay runs home where she tells her father she's going insane, and he tells her that on the contrary he too can see her twin sister Layla. He warns her not to look Layla in the face as it will end her life. Fay goes to the underpass near her home and calls out to Layla asking her to leave the family alone and apologizing for her death. Layla instead orders her to look at her, and Fay does. Returning home from the underpass, Fay sees an ambulance and learns that her father tried to follow her to prevent her from seeing Layla and died when a faulty elevator crashed. She and her mother embrace.

Sometime later, it is the opening night of Macbeth. Backstage Fay's mother hugs her and tells her father would be proud of her. Fay stares into the mirror and then peels off the bandage on her hand revealing that she does not have the distinctive injury Fay gave herself and is actually Layla. She smiles in the mirror and leaves to perform the play; however, the image of Fay remains, stuck in the mirror.

== Cast and characters ==
- Sophie Turner as Fay, a high school student, just cast as Lady Macbeth in the school play, who is increasingly haunted by her twin Layla
- Rhys Ifans as Don, Fay's father who is suffering from multiple sclerosis
- Claire Forlani as Ann, Fay's mother
- Jonathan Rhys Meyers as John Moffat, Fay's drama teacher and director of the play
- Gregg Sulkin as Drew, cast as Macbeth in the school play, and Fay's love interest
- Priyanka Patel as Dawn, Fay's friend
- Ivana Baquero as Kaylie, Fay's friend
- Charlotte Vega as Monica, Fay's rival and understudy in the play
- Geraldine Chaplin as Mrs. Brennan, Fay's elderly neighbor
- Leonor Watling as Mrs. Williams, a teacher at Fay's school

== Production ==
Coixet said that she had a difficult time working with Jonathan Rhys Meyers.

Sophie Turner said she was drawn to the role because she too had lost a twin in utero.

== Release ==
The first trailer was released on 23 July 2014.

The film had its world premiere at the Rome Film Festival in Italy on 15 November 2013. The film was released in Spain on 27 June 2014. and in the United States on 22 August 2014. The film was also released in Germany on 4 September 2014.
