= Carnival Films =

British production company

Carnival Film & Television Limited
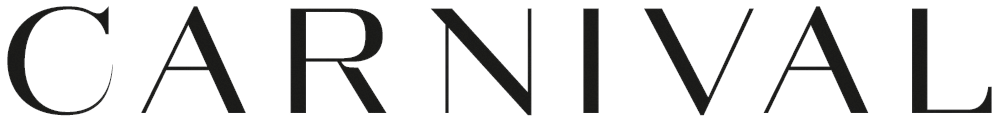
- The Carnival Films logo used from 2017
- Trade name: Carnival Films
- Formerly: Batway Limited (1978–1979); Picture Partnership Productions Limited (1979–1990); Carnival (Films and Theatre) Limited (1990–2007); Carnival Film and Television Limited (Feb–Aug 2007)
- Type: Subsidiary
- Industry: Television production
- Founded: 3 November 1978; 47 years ago
- Founder: Brian Eastman; Leszek Burzynski
- Key people: Gareth Neame (chief executive officer); Nigel Marchant (managing director)
- Products: Motion pictures; Television programmes
- Parent: Southern Star (75%, 2007–2008); Universal International Studios (2008–2026); Universal Global Television (2026–present)
- Website: carnivalfilms.co.uk

Carnival Film & Television Limited, trading as Carnival Films, is a British production company based in London, UK, founded on 3 November 1978 by television producers Brian Eastman and Leszek Burzynski. It has produced television series for all the major UK networks including the BBC, ITV, Channel 4, and Sky UK, as well as international broadcasters including PBS, A&E, HBO and NBC. Productions include single dramas, long-running television dramas, feature films, and stage productions.

== History ==
Carnival Films was founded in 1978 by feature film producer Brian Eastman.

As of 2014, Carnival has produced over 500 hours of drama and comedy for television, cinema and stage. This included 70 episodes of Agatha Christie's Poirot starring David Suchet and 22 episodes of Rosemary & Thyme, starring Felicity Kendal and Pam Ferris. In the action/adventure genre it produced BUGS, Oktober and The Grid, in comedy drama it produced Jeeves and Wooster starring Hugh Laurie and Stephen Fry, teenage drama-comedy As If, as well as the adaptations of Tom Sharpe's novels Blott on the Landscape and Porterhouse Blue.

In 2004, the BBC's former Head of Drama Commissioning Gareth Neame joined Carnival as managing director. In 2007, former Creative Director of BBC Drama Sally Woodward Gentle joined the company as Creative Director. The two had previously worked together on Spooks (MI:5), Tipping the Velvet and Cambridge Spies.

In 2007 Australian production company Southern Star acquired 75% percent of Carnival Films but by 2008 the company was acquired by American-based NBCUniversal as part of its plan to increase its presence in content creation outside the United States. Following several more acquisitions Carnival is now part of NBCUniversal International Television Production alongside newer additions Monkey Kingdom, Working Title Television, Chocolate Media and Lucky Giant in the UK, Lark in Canada and Matchbox Pictures in Australia.

Under the direction of Gareth Neame, Carnival has produced series such as The Philanthropist for NBC; hit BBC series Hotel Babylon; the television films Enid starring Helena Bonham Carter and Matthew Macfadyen; Page Eight starring Bill Nighy, Rachel Weisz, Michael Gambon and Ralph Fiennes; four-part drama Any Human Heart starring Jim Broadbent, Matthew MacFadyen, Hayley Atwell and Kim Cattrall; The Hollow Crownfor BBC; Whitechapel for ITV; Jamestown and Stan Lee's Lucky Man for Sky One; The Last Kingdom for BBC One and Netflix; Belgravia for ITV1 and Epix; Belgravia: The Next Chapter for MGM+; and The Day Of The Jackal and Lockerbie: A Search for Truth for Sky and Peacock. Psychological thriller All Her Fault starring Sarah Snook will also launch on Peacock in late 2025.

Carnival's biggest hit, both critically and commercially, is Downton Abbey, written and co-produced by Julian Fellowes. The final episode of the TV series aired on 25 December 2015. In 2016, Neame and Fellowes started planning a feature adaptation; it was officially confirmed in July 2018 and filming began later that month. Downton Abbey was released in the United Kingdom on 13 September 2019 by Universal Pictures, and in the United States on 20 September 2019 by Focus Features. It received generally positive reviews from critics and grossed $194 million worldwide. The sequel, Downton Abbey: A New Era, was released in 2022, and a third and final film, Downton Abbey: The Grand Finale, was released in September 2025.

== Productions ==
=== Television ===
==== Past ====
2006–2025 (as Carnival Film and Television Ltd.)
- All Her Fault (2025)
- Lockerbie: A Search for Truth (2025)
- The Day Of The Jackal (2024)
- Belgravia: The Next Chapter (2024)
- The Last Kingdom (2015–2022) Two series for BBC One and three series for Netflix – total 46 episodes
- Belgravia (2020) One series for ITV1 / Epix – total 6 episodes
- Stan Lee's Lucky Man (2016–2019) Three series for Sky One – total 28 episodes
- The Hollow Crown (2012–2016) 8 episodes for BBC Two
- Jamestown (2017–2019) Three series for Sky One – total 24 episodes
- Downton Abbey (2010–2015) Six series for ITV1 – total 52 episodes
- The Lost Honour of Christopher Jefferies (2014) Mini Series for ITV1 – total 2 episodes
- Dracula (2013/2014) One series for Sky Living / NBC – total 10 episodes
- Salting the Battlefield (2014) Single Drama for BBC Two (Part 3 of The Worricker Trilogy)
- Turks & Caicos (2014) Single Drama for BBC Two (Part 2 of The Worricker Trilogy)
- The 7.39 (2014) Mini Series for BBC One – total 2 episodes
- Whitechapel (2009–2013) Four series for ITV1 – total 18 episodes
- Murder on the Home Front (2013) Mini Series for ITV1 – total 2 episodes
- The Last Weekend (2012) Mini Series for ITV1 – total 3 episodes
- Page Eight (2011) Single Drama for BBC Two (Part 1 of The Worricker Trilogy)
- Any Human Heart (2010) Miniseries for Channel 4 – total 4 episodes
- Material Girl (2010) One series for BBC One – total 6 episodes
- Enid (2009) Single Drama for BBC Four
- Hotel Babylon (2006–2009) Four series for BBC One – total 32 episodes
- The Philanthropist (2009) One series for NBC – total 8 episodes
- Harley Street (2008) One series for ITV1 – total 6 episodes
- Midnight Man (2008) Mini Series for ITV1 – total 3 episodes
- The Old Curiosity Shop (2007) Single Drama for ITV1/WGBH
- Christmas at the Riviera (2007) Single Drama for ITV1
- Empathy (2007) Single Drama for BBC One
- Sea of Souls: The Prayer Tree (2007) Mini Series for BBC One – total 2 episodes
- The Whistleblowers (2007) One series for ITV1 – total 6 episodes
- Rosemary & Thyme (2003–2006) Three series for ITV1 – total 22 episodes

1989–2005 (as Carnival Film and Theatre Ltd.)

- The Grid: Mini series (2004) for BBC and TNT – total 2 episodes
- Agatha Christie's Poirot: (1989–2004) for ITV1 – total 53 episodes
- As If: four series (2001–2004) for Channel 4 – total 60 episodes
- As If (US): one series (2002) for UPN – total 7 episodes
- The 10th Kingdom: Mini Series (2000) for NBC – total 9 episodes
- Lucy Sullivan Is Getting Married: two series (1999–2000) for ITV1 – total 16 episodes
- Oktober: Mini Series (1998) for ITV1 – total three episodes
- BUGS: four series (1995–1998) for BBC One – total 40 episodes
- Crime Traveller: one series (1997) for BBC One – total 8 episodes
- The Mill on the Floss: TV Film (1997) for BBCOne/WGBH/Canal Plus
- The Fragile Heart: Mini Series (1996) for Channel 4 – total 3 episodes
- The Infiltrator: TV Film (1995) for HBO
- Anna Lee: one series (1994) for ITV – total 5 episodes
- Jeeves and Wooster: four series (1990–1993) for Granada/ ITV – total 23 episodes
- All or Nothing at All: Mini Series (1993) for LWT/ ITV – total 3 episodes
- Head over Heels: one series (1993) for Carlton/ITV – total 7 episodes
- The Big Battalions: Mini Series (1992) for Channel 4 – total 5 episodes
- Traffik: TV Film (1989) for Channel 4
- Forever Green: two series (1989–1992) for LWT/ ITV – total 18 episodes

1978–1988 (as Picture Partnership Productions Ltd.)

- Porterhouse Blue: Mini Series (1987) for Channel 4 – total 4 episodes
- Blott on the Landscape: Mini Series (1985) for BBC – total 6 episodes
- Father's Day: two series (1983–1984) – total 14 episodes

=== Films ===
- Downton Abbey: The Grand Finale (2025)
- The Last Kingdom: Seven Kings Must Die (2022)
- Downton Abbey: A New Era (2022)
- Downton Abbey (2019)
- Firelight (1997)
- Up on the Roof (1997)
- Shadowlands (1993)
- Under Suspicion (1991)
- Wilt (1990)

1978–1988 (as Picture Partnership Productions Ltd.)

- Whoops Apocalypse (1986)
- Cry Wolf (1980)

=== Stage ===
==== Past ====
- Juno and the Paycock (1993) Albery Theatre, London
- How Was It for You? Theatre Royal, Plymouth
- Map of the Heart (1991) Globe Theatre, London
- The Ghost Train (1992) Lyric Theatre, London
- What a Performance (1994) Queens Theatre, London
- Misery (1992) Criterion Theatre, London
- Shadowlands (1990) Brooks Atkinson Theatre, New York
- Up on the Roof (1987)

== Awards ==
Carnival Films has won a wide variety of awards for its work on Television, Film and Stage productions. With the company itself winning the 'Best Independent Production Company' award at both the Televisual Magazine Bulldog Awards 2011, and the Broadcast Awards 2012. In addition Carnival's productions have together been awarded nine Primetime Emmy Awards; one Golden Globe; nineteen BAFTAs; one Screen Actors Guild Award; a Producers Guild of America Award; two National Television Award; three International Emmy Awards; five RTS awards; four BANFF Rockie Awards; three Ivor Novello Awards; two Broadcast awards; a Bulldog award; an Evening Standard Theatre Award; and a Tony.

Further to this success the company's productions have also received nominations from such varied awards bodies as the Academy Awards, the Laurence Olivier Awards, The Monte Carlo International Television Festival, The Screen Actors Guild, The American Society of Cinematographers, The Edgar Allan Poe Awards, The Rose D’Or and The San Sebastian Film Festival.
