= Page Eight =

2011 television film directed by David Hare

- UK DVD cover
- Genre: Political thriller, action drama
- Screenplay by: David Hare
- Directed by: David Hare
- Starring: Bill Nighy; Rachel Weisz; Michael Gambon; Ralph Fiennes; Judy Davis
- Theme music composer: Paul Englishby
- Country of origin: United Kingdom
- Original language: English

Production
- Producers: David Heyman; David Barron
- Cinematography: Martin Ruhe
- Editor: Jinx Godfrey
- Running time: 99 minutes
- Production companies: Carnival Films; Runaway Fridge; BBC Films; Heyday Films

Original release
- Network: BBC Two & BBC HD
- Release: 28 August 2011

Related
- Turks & Caicos

Page Eight is a 2011 British political thriller, written and directed for the BBC by the British dramatist David Hare, his first film as director since the 1989 film Strapless. The cast includes Bill Nighy, Rachel Weisz, Michael Gambon, Tom Hughes, Ralph Fiennes, and Judy Davis. The film was followed by Turks & Caicos (2014) and Salting the Battlefield (2014), which were broadcast on BBC Two in March 2014. The three films are collectively known as The Worricker Trilogy.

== Plot summary ==
Johnny Worricker is a long-serving MI5 officer. His best friend and superior, director general Benedict Baron, summons Worricker to a meeting with fellow MI5 agent Jill Tankard and Home Secretary Anthea Catcheside regarding a potentially explosive report. Worricker highlights a note at the foot of page eight alleging that Prime Minister Alec Beasley has knowledge of secret overseas prisons where American authorities have tortured terror suspects. If true, Beasley did not share any intelligence gained with the security services, at the possible expense of British lives.

At the same time, Worricker begins spending time with his neighbour Nancy Pierpan, a Syrian-born political activist whose brother was killed by the Israeli military. Worricker shares his love of modern art and jazz with Nancy but, wondering if she aims to exploit his connections, asks friend and covert intelligence operative Rollo Maverley to investigate her. Meanwhile, Baron dies of a heart attack at his country home before he can make the report public. Beasley orders the report to be buried and tells Worricker of his plans to replace MI5 with a US-style Homeland Security organisation. Catcheside's silence is bought by naming her Deputy Prime Minister.

Worricker sells a valuable Christopher Wood painting from his own art collection, for cash. He breaks into the studio of an acquaintance of Pierpan's, seen loitering around the apartment building, and learns that the acquaintance is Tankard's son and has been paid to monitor him. Worricker realises that Beasley and Tankard are running a politicised "cowboy" intelligence operation. Worricker gives Pierpan a copy of the secret file on her brother's death, but points out that he would be implicated if its existence were to be revealed by her. Worricker ends up making a deal with Tankard to keep quiet about the report. In return for Worricker's silence, Tankard agrees to drop the reorganisation of the intelligence services and leak the file on Pierpan's brother's murder to the BBC. The fallout forces Worricker to disappear for his safety.

Worricker gives Pierpan another Christopher Wood painting from his collection and tells her she can have his car, as he is leaving the country. On seeing the leaked report of her brother's murder on the news, she realises that Worricker leaked it to allow her to pursue a legal case against the Israelis without implicating himself. At Stansted Airport, Worricker dumps the original report incriminating Beasley in a rubbish bin. As Worricker looks at the departure screen, Pierpan looks closely at Worricker's painting, of a church near a beach.

== Cast ==
- Bill Nighy as Johnny Worricker, MI5 analyst
- Rachel Weisz as Nancy Pierpan, political activist
- Michael Gambon as Benedict Baron, Director General of MI5
- Judy Davis as Jill Tankard, MI5 officer collaborating with the Prime Minister
- Tom Hughes as Ralph Wilson, private investigator and Jill Tankard's son
- Saskia Reeves as Anthea Catcheside, Home Secretary
- Ewen Bremner as Rollo Maverley, journalist and former MI5 officer
- Felicity Jones as Julianne Worricker, Johnny's daughter
- Ralph Fiennes as Alec Beasley, Prime Minister
- Alice Krige as Emma Baron, Benedict Baron's wife and Johnny's ex-wife
- Holly Aird as Anna Herve, assistant to the Home Secretary and former lover to Johnny
- Richard Lintern as Max Vallance, assistant to the Prime Minister
- Bruce Myers as Joseph Pierpan, Nancy Pierpan's father
- Rakhee Thakrar as Muna Hammami
- Kate Burdette as Allegra Betts
- Andrew Cleaver as Brian Lord
- Marthe Keller as Leona Chew
- Aisling Loftus as Melissa Legge
- James McArdle as Ted Finch
- Jay Benedict as Master of the college
- Surendra Kochar as Mrs. Ashanti
- Bijan Daneshmand as Cambridge don
- Kriss Dosanjh as Minicab owner
- Hywel Morgan as Priest
- Rory Morrison as Radio Newsreader
- Charlotte Green as Radio Newsreader

== Production ==
Parts were filmed in Jesus College, Cambridge, in which undergraduates and Fellows were recruited as extras.

The gallery scene where Worricker sells his painting is filmed in Saffron Walden; the property used as the gallery is on the corner of Church Street and Museum Street, number 26a and 28 Church Street. It is a listed building.

Worricker then collects his parked car from Market Hill in that town outside the Kings Arms public house.

== Release ==
The film had its world premiere on 18 June 2011 at the Edinburgh International Film Festival and closed the 36th Toronto International Film Festival on 17 September 2011. It was broadcast on BBC Two and BBC HD on 28 August 2011 in the United Kingdom, and on PBS in the United States on 6 November 2011, as part of its Masterpiece Contemporary anthology series. It was released on DVD and Blu-ray on 5 September 2013 by Universal Pictures.

== Accolades ==
At the 2011 Satellite Awards, Page Eight was nominated for Best Miniseries or Motion Picture Made for Television. Bill Nighy and Rachel Weisz were nominated for Best Actor in a Miniseries or a Motion Picture Made for Television and Best Actress in a Miniseries or a Motion Picture Made for Television, respectively.

Bill Nighy received a nomination for Best Actor – Miniseries or Television Film at the 2012 Golden Globe Awards.

Martin Ruhe, Page Eight's Director of Photography, won Outstanding Achievement in Cinematography in Motion Picture/Miniseries Television at the 26th American Society of Cinematographers Awards.

Page Eight received a nomination for Best TV Movie at the 2012 Rose d’Or TV Festival.

At the 2012 British Academy Television Awards, Page Eight was nominated for the Single Drama Award.

Paul Englishby was nominated for Best Television Soundtrack at the 2012 Ivor Novello Awards.

At the 2012 Critics' Choice Television Awards, Page Eight was nominated for Best Made for TV Movie/Mini Series, while Bill Nighy was nominated for Best Actor.

At the 2012 Primetime Emmy Awards, Judy Davis received a nomination nod in the category of Outstanding Supporting Actress in a Miniseries or Movie, while Paul Englishby won for Outstanding Original Main Title Theme Music.
