= The Thirteenth Tale =

2006 novel by Diane Setterfield

- First edition cover
- Author: Diane Setterfield
- Audio read by: Bianca Amato
- Language: English
- Genre: Gothic, Suspense
- Publisher: Atria Books
- Publication date: 12 September 2006
- Publication place: United Kingdom
- Media type: Print (hardback & paperback) & audiobook
- Pages: 416 pp
- ISBN: 0-7432-9802-0
- OCLC: 67361489
- Dewey Decimal: 813/.6 22
- LC Class: PR6119.E86 T48 2006

The Thirteenth Tale (2006) by Diane Setterfield is a gothic suspense novel; it was the author's debut book.

== Plot ==
Vida Winter, a famous novelist in England, leads a secretive life; despite her popularity for the past six decades, she has evaded journalists' inquiries into her past and avoided addressing her erroneous autobiographies. With her health declining, Winter decides to enlist Margaret Lea, an erudite amateur biographer, to finally recount her true life. As Lea unravels her story, she confronts her own ghosts.

The novel opens as Lea returns to her apartment above her father's antiquarian bookshop and finds a hand-written letter from Winter. It requests her presence at the author's residence and offers the chance to write Winter's life story before she succumbs to a terminal illness. Lea is surprised by the proposal, as she is only vaguely aware of the famous author and has not read any of the dozens of novels penned by Winter.

While considering the offer, Lea's curiosity prompts her to read her father's rare copy of Winter's Thirteen Tales of Change and Desperation. She is unexpectedly spellbound by the stories and confused when she realises the book contains only twelve stories. “Where is the thirteenth tale?” Intrigued, Margaret agrees to meet with the ageing author—if only to discuss her reasons for not accepting the position as Winter's biographer.

During their meeting at Winter's home, Lea attempts to politely decline the offer and leave, but is stopped at the door by the pleas of the older woman. With promises of a ghost story involving twins, Winter desperately implores the bibliophile to reconsider. By the end of the encounter, Lea finds herself increasingly drawn to the story and proposes a conditional agreement to Winter; to earn the trust of her biographer, Vida Winter must supply her with three verifiable truths. Somewhat reluctantly, the three secrets are extracted from their keeper. Afterwards, Winter and Lea begin their adventure into the past with; "Once upon a time there were two little girls...".

As Vida Winter tells her story to Lea, she shares dark family secrets which have long been kept hidden. She recalls her days at Angelfield (the estate that was her childhood home), which has since burned and been abandoned. Recording Winter's account (the author allows no questions), Lea becomes completely immersed in the strange and troubling story. In the end, both women have to confront their pasts and the weight of family secrets, as well as the ghosts that haunt them.

== Title ==
The title of the book is derived from a collection of short stories penned by Vida Winter entitled Thirteen Tales of Change and Desperation; the collection was supposed to contain a total of thirteen stories but was shortened to twelve at publication. Though its title was appropriately amended and its cover eventually reprinted to read simply Tales of Change and Desperation, a small number of books were printed with the original title and the twelve stories. This small press run became a collector's item (one of which Lea's father holds). Many of Winter's fans considered the omission of the thirteenth story a delightful mystery, and all wanted the answer to it. During the course of the story, Lea is asked more than once what she knows about the missing tale, and why it was never written. At the novel's conclusion, Lea receives the long-awaited thirteenth tale as a parting gift from Vida Winter.

== Style ==
The chapters of the book switch between the past and present day life of the two main characters (Margaret Lea, Vida Winter). At the novel's inception, Lea divulges her work in her father's antique book store, her one-time jaunt as an amateur biographer, and her chance discovery at age 10 that she was born a conjoined twin, her sister dying shortly after their separation. This discovery has caused her pain and provided a reason for longing she felt, and for her strained relationship with her mother, who became depressed and withdrawn after the twin's death. After the character of Vida Winter is introduced, she narrates sections of the book, in sessions with Lea in her library. Given Winter's detailed and vivid account of her past, Lea later finds it easy to write a narrative from her notes. This becomes the biography that Winter commissioned from Lea.

The story of Winter's history is at first written in third person past tense, but at a turning point in the story, when Charlie is missing, Winter suddenly uses the pronoun "I". This is explained later in the book when Lea understands all the secrets of the March family. The remainder of the book switches between Lea in the present, who tries to fight her own ghosts and discover the secret of the March family, and the story of the Marches seen through the eyes of Winter.

The switches between Lea's character narration and Winter's story is marked by a graphic that clearly show which character is narrating that section of the chapter. It is also made more obvious by the lack of dialogue. When the narrative is about the past, dialogue is rarely shown. There is more dialogue when the story is located in the present; particularly between Lea and Aurelius.

== Structure ==
The Thirteenth Tale is a book which shifts between two main stories. One tells of the life of amateur biographer Margaret Lea and her exploration of the Angelfield/March family's past. The other is the story which Winter tells Lea. These two intertwined stories are occasionally interrupted by letters and notes of supporting characters. The change between the different sections in this book is indicated by a small graphic or an asterisk or a new chapter.

The Thirteenth Tale is told through a first-person point of view, commonly Margaret Lea's. In this way, the reader only knows what Lea knows, and is able to solve the mystery with her. The first-person point of view also shifts to other characters, such as Vida Winter, who presents her own view through the story she tells Lea, and Hester Barrow, who presents her own view through the entries in her diary. Vida Winter originally tells her story through a third-person point of view, but then changes to first person, which causes Lea to speculate about the truthfulness of her story. This change is later explained in the book, when the idea of a cousin is introduced. Towards the end of the book it is found that Vida is half sister to the twins. Charles fathered Vida and the twins.

The Thirteenth Tale is divided into four sections: Beginnings, Middles, Endings and again Beginnings. Each section is introduced by a title page with the name of the section and a photograph which hints what will happen in that particular section of the book. The 'Beginnings' title page has a photograph of two pairs of black-buckled shoes, like the shoes the little girls wear on the cover of the book. Placed side by side, the pairs of shoes suggest similarity and bonds; they cause the reader to speculate about the theme of twins, as twins often wear matching clothing. The 'Middles' title page has a picture of a fancy doorknob on a slightly ajar door. The opening of the door represents the reader going further into the story, opening another door and proceeding and, in turn, revealing more secrets. At this point in the book the reader, with Margaret Lea, begins to unravel the mystery of Vida Winter and the Angelfield/March family. The 'Endings' title page is represented by a photograph of ripped pages of books, crumpled and folded over each other. The words on the pages indicate the pages are from Charlotte Brontë's Jane Eyre, a book which is known to have influenced some characters in the novel, such as Margaret Lea and Vida Winter. Jane Eyre provides a link among all these characters, and the ripped pages indicate the ending of all their stories.

== Reception ==
One week after publication, the novel became No. 1 on The New York Times Best Seller list in 2006. Reviews include the following:

- Kirkus Reviews – "a contemporary Gothic tale whose excesses and occasional implausibility can be forgiven for the thrill of the storytelling. Setterfield's debut is enchanting Goth for the 21st century."
- Library Journal – "It's a gothic novel, and it doesn't pretend to be anything fancier. But this one grabs the reader with its damp, icy fingers and doesn't let go until the last shocking secret has been revealed."
- The Washington Post – "The Thirteenth Tale keeps us reading for its nimble cadences and atmospheric locales, as well as for its puzzles, the pieces of which, for the most part, fall into place just as we discover where the holes are. And yet, for all its success – and perhaps because of them – on the whole the book feels unadventurous, content to rehash literacy formulas rather than reimagining them."

AudioFile magazine wrote of the audiobook recording, "Bianca Amato is stunning as Margaret ... Amato's respect for the power of story and the written word is heard in every utterance. Jill Tanner accomplishes a tour de force as the enigmatic and mysterious Vida ... her voice takes on the strength and power of a master storyteller as she weaves her spellbinding life story."
