= Worricker Trilogy =

Political thriller film trilogy made for the BBC

The Worricker Trilogy is a political thriller film trilogy made for the BBC.

The films were written and directed by David Hare and star Bill Nighy as Johnny Worricker, a British intelligence analyst working to right a wrong. The story involves black sites, and a conspiracy involving the British prime minister.

The story is told in Page Eight (2011), followed by Turks & Caicos, and concluded in Salting the Battlefield (both 2014).

== Plot ==
In the first film, Page Eight, Bill Nighy plays Johnny Worricker, a long-serving MI5 officer. He is involved in an investigation which results in him leaking a secret report, and having to leave the country for his own safety.

In Turks and Caicos, he is drawn back into the situation of events that started the first film. At the end, both he and his old girlfriend Margot Tyrell have to go on the run to evade capture by MI5.

In the final film, Salting the Battlefield, Worricker manages to resolve the situation, engineering the downfall of the prime minister, and is pulled back into MI5.
