= Turks & Caicos (film) =

2014 television film directed by David Hare

- Title card
- Genre: Political thriller, action drama
- Written by: David Hare
- Directed by: David Hare
- Starring: Bill Nighy; Helena Bonham Carter; Rupert Graves; Ralph Fiennes; Ewen Bremner; James McArdle; Winona Ryder; Christopher Walken; Dylan Baker; Meredith Eaton; Zach Grenier; Julie Hewlett; James Naughton; Malik Yoba
- Theme music composer: Paul Englishby
- Countries of origin: United Kingdom; United States
- Original language: English

Production
- Producer: Celia Duval
- Running time: 95 minutes
- Production companies: Carnival Films; Heyday Films; Beaglepug; Masterpiece

Original release
- Network: BBC Two; BBC Two HD
- Release: 20 March 2014

Related
- Page Eight; Salting the Battlefield

Turks & Caicos is a 2014 political thriller television film, written and directed for the BBC by the playwright David Hare. It follows Page Eight, which aired on BBC Two in August 2011 and is followed by Salting the Battlefield, which concludes the Worricker Trilogy.

== Plot ==
Following the events of Page Eight, ex-MI5 officer Johnny Worricker is in hiding on the Turks and Caicos Islands under the alias of Tom Eliot. A seemingly chance encounter with Curtis Pelissier leads Worricker to a dinner with several shady American businessmen who comprise a company called Gladstone. The following morning, one of the businessmen is found dead on the beach in suspicious circumstances; Melanie Fall, a Gladstone liaison, seems to know more than she lets on. When Pelissier reveals himself to be a CIA covert operative who knows Worricker's true identity, Worricker desperately cuts a deal: he will help Pelissier with the investigation of Gladstone in exchange for his silence about his location.

The remaining businessmen claim to be on the islands for an international financial colloquium. Worricker learns they have a link to London private equity mogul Stirling Rogers, who is also director of a charitable foundation called The Bridge. Worricker links The Bridge to his old nemesis, Prime Minister Alec Beasley. Worricker's old girlfriend, former fellow MI5 analyst Margot Tyrell, is now a financial expert in London who is working with Rogers. He calls on old acquaintance Rollo Maverley to contact Tyrell and extract information regarding The Bridge.

Before long, Worricker learns the extent of Gladstone's activities: they are "quartermasters" who have been overcharging the US government for the construction of black site torture camps. When Tyrell and Rogers arrive on the island, Worricker quickly makes his presence known and, along with Pelissier, sets up a high-stakes meeting with the concerned parties. Amid tense negotiations, Worricker – with the help of Tyrell's information – secures a deal between the CIA and Gladstone, and reveals a link between the company's excess funds and Beasley's ambitions. Worricker is double-crossed by Pelissier and is forced to flee the islands. He and Tyrell reconcile, and – with the help of local policeman Carroll – evade the CIA long enough to escape via boat. The two now go on the run, knowing their lives will never be the same again.

== Cast ==
- Bill Nighy as Johnny Worricker, former MI5 analyst
- Helena Bonham Carter as Margot Tyrrell, Johnny's ex-girlfriend
- Rupert Graves as Stirling Rogers, director of 'The Bridge' foundation
- Ralph Fiennes as Prime Minister Alec Beasley
- Ewen Bremner as Rollo Maverley
- James McArdle as Ted Finch
- Winona Ryder as Melanie Fall, Financial PR
- Christopher Walken as Curtis Pelissier, a CIA agent on the islands
- Dylan Baker as Gary Bethwaite
- Meredith Eaton as Clare Clovis, an accountant for Gladstone
- Zach Grenier as Dido Parsons
- Julie Hewlett as Natalie Helier
- James Naughton as Frank Church
- Malik Yoba as Jim Carroll, a detective with the Royal Turks & Caicos Islands Police Force

== Production ==
Filming took place in London and the Turks and Caicos Islands. Turks & Caicos is a Carnival Films, Heyday Films, Beaglepug and Masterpiece co-production in association with NBCUniversal for BBC Television.
