= Salting the Battlefield =

2014 television film directed by David Hare

- Genre: Drama, Thriller, Crime, Action
- Written by: David Hare
- Directed by: David Hare
- Country of origin: United Kingdom
- Original language: English

Production
- Producer: Celia Duval
- Running time: 93 minutes
- Production companies: Carnival Films; Heyday Films; Beaglepug; Masterpiece

Original release
- Network: BBC Two
- Release: 27 March 2014

Related
- Turks & Caicos

Salting the Battlefield is a 2014 British political thriller television film, written and directed for the BBC by the British writer David Hare. It follows Page Eight, which aired on BBC Two in August 2011 and Turks & Caicos, which also aired in 2014, and concludes the Worricker Trilogy.

== Plot ==
Following their flight from Turks and Caicos, Johnny Worricker (Bill Nighy) and Margot Tyrrell (Helena Bonham Carter) hopscotch around Europe to evade capture by MI5. After spotting an MI5 agent he had recruited, disguised as a passing jogger, Worricker relocates once again and instructs former colleague Rollo Maverley (Ewen Bremner) to leak news of Prime Minister Alec Beasley's (Ralph Fiennes) corrupt dealings with Stirling Rogers (Rupert Graves) and his Bridge Foundation. Tyrrell covertly keeps in touch with Worricker's pregnant daughter Julianne (Felicity Jones). In London, Acting Director General Jill Tankard (Judy Davis) contacts Deputy Prime Minister Anthea Catcheside (Saskia Reeves) and offers her services in aiding Catcheside's embattled husband, Bill.

Worricker and Tyrrell separate on their way back into Britain to confound their pursuers. While Worricker disappears and travels via ferry across the English Channel, an errant MI5 agent accidentally encounters Tyrrell on the Eurostar train and alerts his superiors. Maverley aids Tyrrell's escape and delivers her to Rev. Bernard Towers (Malcolm Sinclair), a friend of Johnny's from Cambridge. Worricker contacts Belinda Kay (Olivia Williams), editor-in-chief of The Independent newspaper and details the workings of the financial deals surrounding Beasley, Rogers, and the Bridge Foundation. The Independent's publication of the information causes Rogers to resign from the foundation and admit to his misdeeds, despite Beasley's assurances.

Tyrrell is contacted by Julianne after discovering her boyfriend (Shazad Latif) is a plant by MI5, who has bugged her flat. Worricker arranges a meeting with Beasley at 10 Downing Street, demanding he call off the surveillance against his daughter. Beasley reveals that he intends to leave office and assume the title of Consul General to Iran, with United Nations cover and American funding. Then Worricker is summoned to a meeting with Tankard, who reveals that she has been gently shepherding his return to the UK by using her worst agents while also engineering Beasley's downfall after seeing the extent of the Page Eight report, the intelligence that started the scandal. Through her burying of Bill Catcheside's legal troubles, Tankard has leverage in her pocket over the Deputy Prime Minister — Beasley's planned successor. Tankard asks Worricker to return to MI5, an offer he reluctantly accepts in return for Julianne and Tyrrell's safety and Maverley's reinstatement into MI5 as well.

Returning to Tyrrell's apartment, Worricker sees she is leaving for Hong Kong to work in a start-up company. Tyrrell also mentions that Julianne is in labour, accompanied by her mother. The film closes with scenes of Tyrrell leaving by taxi, Julianne giving birth to her child, and Worricker sauntering across London to the MI5 headquarters.

== Cast ==
- Bill Nighy as Johnny Worricker, former MI5 analyst
- Helena Bonham Carter as Margot Tyrrell
- Rupert Graves as Stirling Rogers
- Ralph Fiennes as Alec Beasley MP, Prime Minister
- Ewen Bremner as Rollo Maverley
- James McArdle as Ted Finch
- Judy Davis as Jill Tankard, Acting Director General of MI5
- Felicity Jones as Julianne Worricker
- Valeria Vereau as Elisabeth
- Saskia Reeves as Anthea Catcheside MP, Deputy Prime Minister
- Olivia Williams as Belinda Kay, editor-in-chief of The Independent
- Leanne Best as Amber Page, an MI5 officer pursuing Johnny and Margot
- Pip Carter as Freddy Lagarde
- Daniel Ryan as Bill Catcheside
- Kate Burdette as Allegra Betts
- Shazad Latif as Jez Nichols
- Malcolm Sinclair as Reverend Bernard Towers
