= Once Upon a River (novel) =

2018 novel by Diane Setterfield

- First edition (UK)
- Author: Diane Setterfield
- Language: English
- Genre: Historical, Fantasy
- Set in: River Thames, England
- Publisher: Doubleday (UK); Atria Books (US)
- Publication date: 2018
- Publication place: United Kingdom
- Pages: 480

Once Upon a River is a novel by British author Diane Setterfield, published in 2018. The story centres around a mysterious girl who returns to life after drowning in the River Thames. Setterfield's third novel, the book received praise for its strong characterisations and powerful storytelling.

== Background ==
Setterfield's first inspiration for the story came from real-life accounts of people appearing to die and come back to life when suffering from cold shock response after falling into rivers.

The novel's setting was partially inspired by Setterfield's childhood fascination with pubs and storytelling.

One of the characters, Henry Daunt, is "inspired by" the real person Henry Taunt (1842–1922), a photographer who lived in Oxford.

== Summary ==
A girl, seemingly drowned, is brought into an inn at Radcot in Oxfordshire. Soon, the child inexplicably comes to life. The story follows three separate parties with an interest in the fate of the girl.

== Publication ==
Setterfield moved to Doubleday for the publication of Once Upon a River. The book was published in December 2018.

== Reception ==
The book received largely positive reviews. The Times named it as its Book of the Month for January 2019. The Financial Times described it as "magical in every way." The Washington Post praised the novel's "stunning prose" and strong setting.
