= Sophie Turner =

British actress (born 1996)

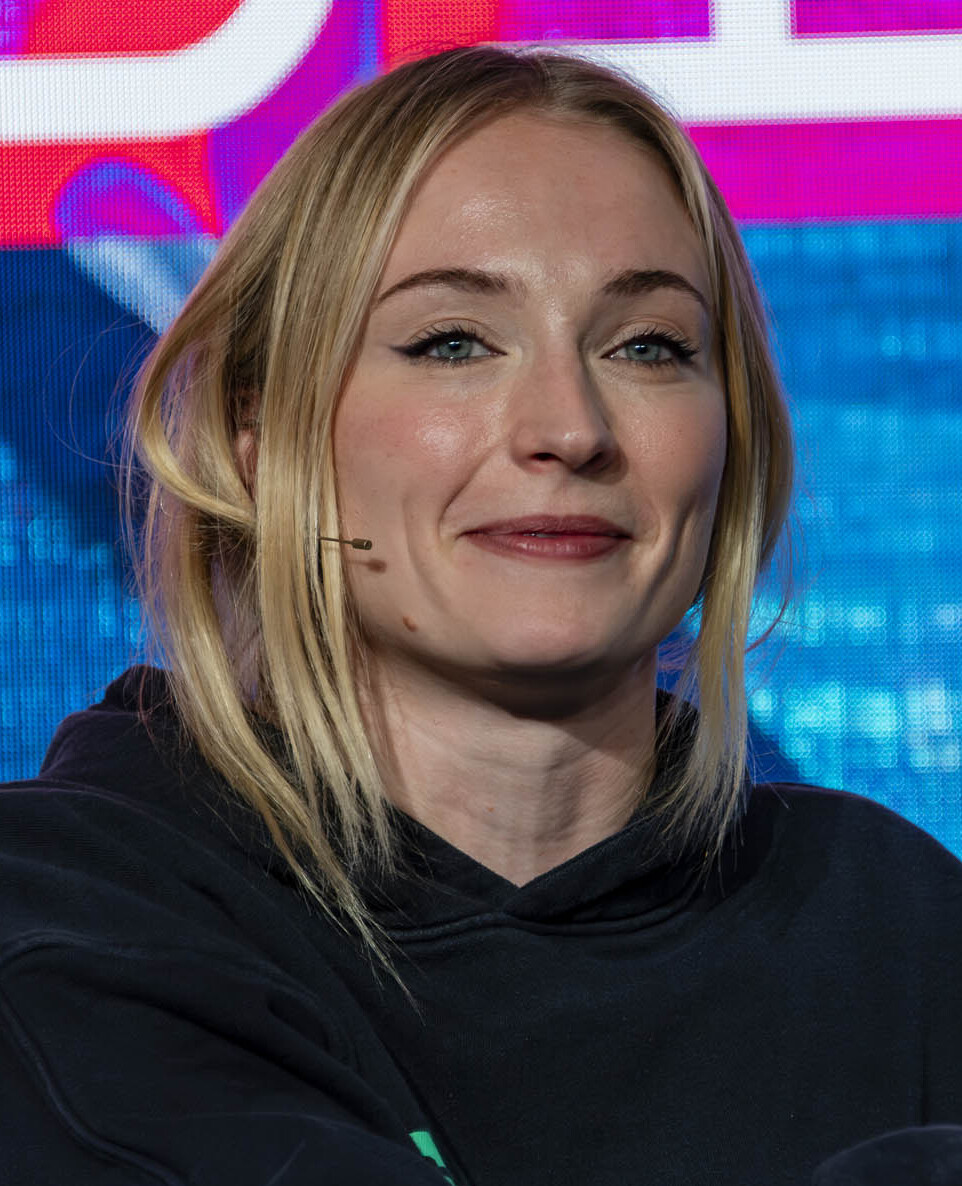
- Turner at SXSW London in 2025
- Born: Sophie Belinda Turner; 21 February 1996 (age 30); Northampton, England
- Occupation: Actress
- Years active: 2009–present
- Spouse: Joe Jonas (m. 2019; div. 2024)
- Children: 2

Sophie Belinda Turner (born 21 February 1996) is an English actress. She made her acting debut as Sansa Stark in the television series Game of Thrones (2011–2019), for which she received an Emmy Award nomination for Outstanding Supporting Actress in 2019.

Turner appeared in the 2013 British television film The Thirteenth Tale and made her feature film debut in Another Me in 2013. She also appeared in Barely Lethal (2015) and portrayed a young Jean Grey / Phoenix in the X-Men film series (2016–2019) and Lara Croft in the Amazon Prime Video series Tomb Raider.

== Early life and education ==
Sophie Belinda Turner was born in Northampton, England, on 21 February 1996, the daughter of Sally, a nursery school teacher, and Andrew, managing director of an international pallet distribution company. She has two older brothers. Her twin died in utero. She moved to Chesterton, Warwickshire, when she was two years old. She grew up in a large Edwardian house near Leamington Spa.

She started acting at three years old at the Playbox Theatre Company, and after leaving in 2013, became an ambassador for the company in 2014.

Turner attended Warwick Prep School until she was 11, and later attended the independent The King's High School for Girls. She had a tutor on the set of Game of Thrones until age 16.

== Career ==
Turner was cast as Sansa Stark, a young noblewoman, in the HBO fantasy drama series Game of Thrones in August 2009. Filming began in July 2010, when Turner was 14 years old. Sansa was Turner's first television role. Turner's drama teacher encouraged her to audition for the part, and she dyed her blonde hair auburn for the role, although in season 7 she began wearing wigs. In 2012, she was nominated for the Young Artist Award for Best Performance in a TV Series – Supporting Young Actress for her performance as Sansa, alongside her on-screen sister, Maisie Williams. Turner appeared in all eight broadcast seasons.

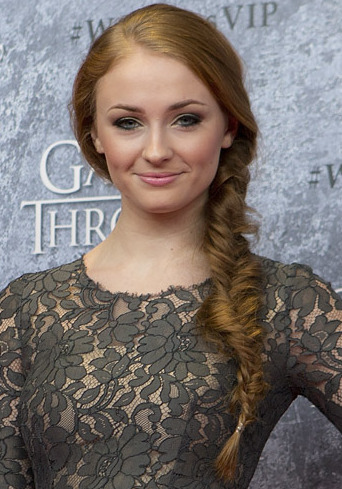
Turner at the season 3 premiere of Game of Thrones in 2013

While playing Sansa Stark, Turner was told to lose weight, and she said she suffered from mental health problems while spending her teenage years on screen. She also had an eating disorder.

In 2013, Turner had her first movie role as the lead character in the independent thriller film Another Me, based on the novel of the same name by Catherine MacPhail. She starred as Adeline March in the 2013 television film The Thirteenth Tale. In 2013, she was cast in the comedy film Barely Lethal, alongside Hailee Steinfeld, which was released on 29 May 2015 in a limited release and through video on demand.

Turner also narrated the audiobook version of the Lev Grossman short story "The Girl in the Mirror", which was included in the short fiction anthology Dangerous Women and was edited by George R. R. Martin. In 2014, she narrated the audiobook City of Heavenly Fire by Cassandra Clare. The same year, she was the face of Karen Millen's "The Journey" campaign. Turner played mutant Jean Grey in X-Men: Apocalypse, which was released in May 2016 to mixed critical success. During the summer 2016, she hosted the web video Powershift in partnership with the Huffington Post.

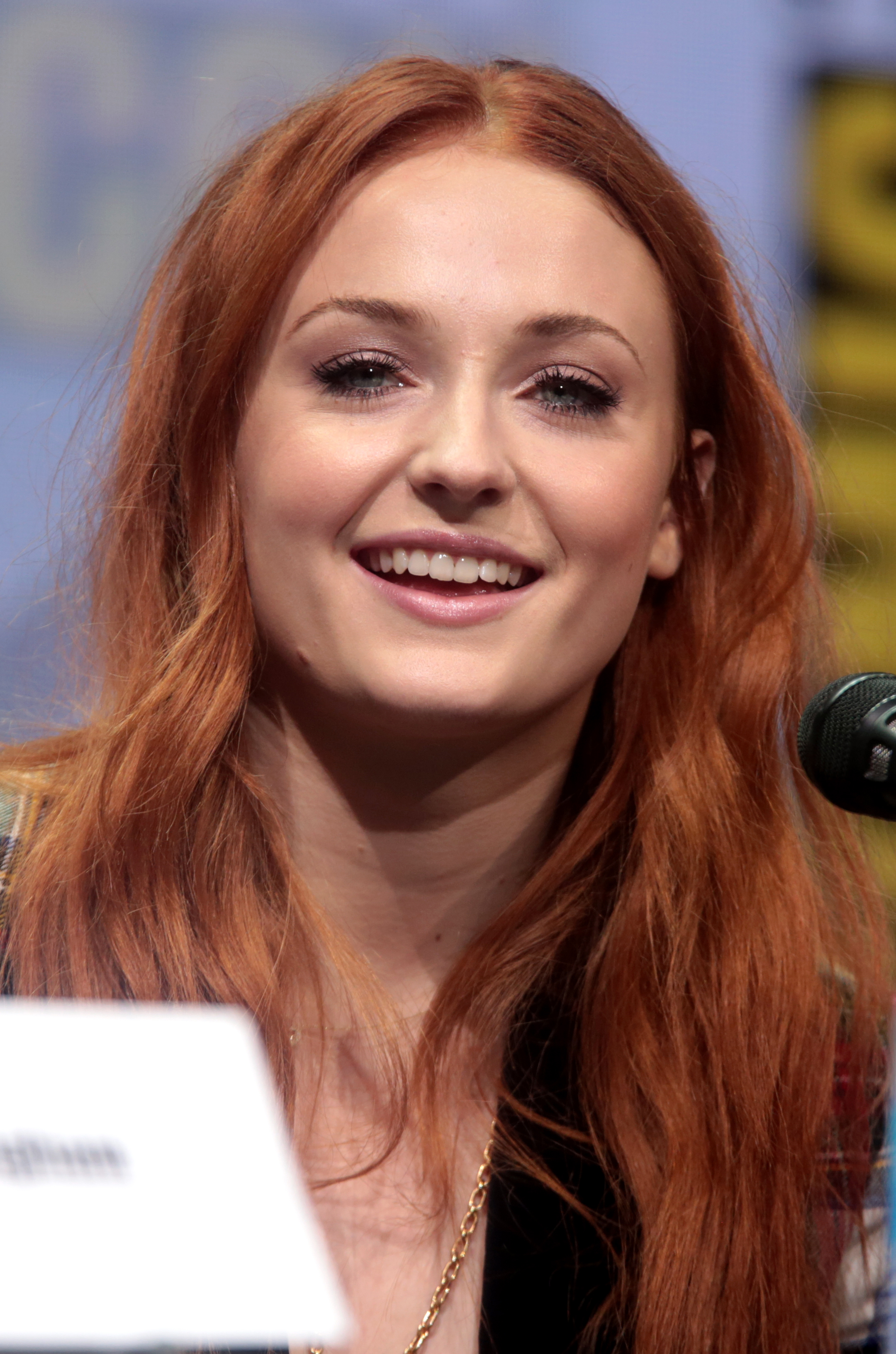
Turner at the 2017 San Diego Comic-Con, California.

In March 2017, she announced she had become a patron of Women for Women, an organisation that supports female war survivors. In August 2017, Turner said she believed her social media following was responsible for her successful casting in an unnamed project rather than her abilities as an actress, saying, "[I]t was between me and another girl who is a far better actress than I am, far better, but I had the followers, so I got the job." In June 2017, she began a collaboration with Wella Hair, becoming its first international brand ambassador.

In November 2017, Turner was cast to play Juliane Koepcke in the film Girl Who Fell From the Sky, which she also produced. In March and April 2018, she filmed the independent film Heavy in Toronto, Ontario, Canada. Turner reprised her role as Jean Grey in the X-Men film Dark Phoenix, which takes place in 1992 and follows the events of Apocalypse. The film was released in June 2019.

She has been featured in print work for the luxury designer brand Louis Vuitton. In September 2019, Turner was cast in the thriller television show Survive.

In 2022, Turner appeared in a minor role as Erica in the teen black comedy Do Revenge. Turner figures in a pivotal scene where her character is accused of drug possession and has an "over-the-top" reaction. The scene went viral due to Turner's delivery of the line, which she admitted was intentionally played to emulate cinema outbursts from actors like Leonardo DiCaprio and Jack Nicholson.

In 2024, Turner starred in the ITV serial drama Joan in the lead role of diamond thief Joan Hannington. Outside of acting, Turner is on the cultural advisory board of Colossal Biosciences and has said that working with the company "feels like bringing a bit of fantasy to life".

In June 2025, Turner was a speaker at South by Southwest London. In September 2025, Amazon Prime Video Turner announced she would play Lara Croft in the live-action Tomb Raider TV series, which was filmed early-2026.

== Personal life ==
Turner began dating American singer Joe Jonas in 2016. They became engaged on 15 October 2017, while visiting Sophie's parents, and were married on 1 May 2019 in Las Vegas, Nevada. The couple lived for a time in New York City and Miami Beach. They held a second wedding ceremony in Paris on 29 June 2019. The couple have two daughters.

Turner was the inspiration behind the song "Hesitate", written as a love letter to her by Jonas, for the Jonas Brothers reunion album, Happiness Begins.

In early September 2023, Jonas filed for divorce from Turner in Miami. This was then confirmed by both Turner and Jonas via Instagram to be a mutual decision. Later that month, she sued her estranged husband to allow their daughters, who were born in the United States, to return to the UK. The lawsuit was dismissed shortly afterwards. Jonas and Turner reached a temporary custody agreement in October 2023. The divorce was finalised in September 2024.

Turner has combined type attention deficit hyperactivity disorder (ADHD). She has said that she had an identity crisis at age 13, and a "mini-breakdown" during her 20s.

== Filmography ==
=== Film ===
Year	Title	Role	Ref.
2013	Another Me	Fay / Lila Delussey	
2015	Barely Lethal	Heather / Agent 84	
2016	X-Men: Apocalypse	Jean Grey	
2018	Josie	Josie	
2018	Time Freak	Debbie	
2019	Dark Phoenix	Jean Grey / Phoenix	
2019	Heavy	Maddie	
2022	Every Last Secret	Penelope	
2022	Do Revenge	Erica Norman	
2025	Trust	Lauren Lane	
2026	The Dreadful	Anne	

=== Television ===
Year	Title	Role	Notes	Ref.
2011–2019	Game of Thrones	Sansa Stark	Main role	
2013	The Thirteenth Tale	Young Adeline March/Vida March	Television film	
2020	Survive	Jane	Main role	
2020	Home Movie: The Princess Bride	Westley	Episode: "Chapter Six: The Fire Swamp"	
2021	The Prince	Princess Charlotte	Main voice role	
2022	The Staircase	Margaret Ratliff	Main role	
2022	StoryBots: Answer Time	Lady Eleanor	Episode: "Sand"	
2024	Joan	Joan Hannington	Main role	
2026	Steal	Zara Dunne	Main role	
TBA	Tomb Raider †	Lara Croft	Lead role	

=== Music videos ===
Year	Title	Artist(s)	Ref.
2014	"Oblivion"	Bastille	
2019	"Sucker"	Jonas Brothers	
2020	"What a Man Gotta Do"	Jonas Brothers	

== Awards and nominations ==
Major associations
Year	Award	Category	Work	Result	Ref.
2011	Screen Actors Guild Award	Outstanding Performance by an Ensemble in a Drama Series	Game of Thrones	Nominated	
2013	Screen Actors Guild Award	Outstanding Performance by an Ensemble in a Drama Series	Game of Thrones	Nominated	
2014	Screen Actors Guild Award	Outstanding Performance by an Ensemble in a Drama Series	Game of Thrones	Nominated	
2015	Screen Actors Guild Award	Outstanding Performance by an Ensemble in a Drama Series	Game of Thrones	Nominated	
2016	Screen Actors Guild Award	Outstanding Performance by an Ensemble in a Drama Series	Game of Thrones	Nominated	
2017	Screen Actors Guild Award	Outstanding Performance by an Ensemble in a Drama Series	Game of Thrones	Nominated	
2019	Screen Actors Guild Award	Outstanding Performance by an Ensemble in a Drama Series	Game of Thrones	Nominated	
2019	Primetime Emmy Awards	Outstanding Supporting Actress in a Drama Series	Game of Thrones	Nominated	

Miscellaneous awards
Year	Award	Category	Work	Result	Ref.
2011	Scream Awards	Scream Award for Best Ensemble	Game of Thrones	Nominated	
2012	Young Artist Awards	Best Performance in a TV Series – Supporting Young Actress	Game of Thrones	Nominated	
2015	Empire Hero Award	Empire Hero Award	Game of Thrones	Won	
2015	EWwy Award	Best Supporting Actress, Drama	Game of Thrones	Nominated	
2016	Huading Awards	Best Global Actress	Herself	Won	
2016	Glamour Awards	Best UK TV Actress	Game of Thrones	Won	
2016	Venice International Film Festival	International Movie Award	Herself	Won	
2016	EWwy Award	Best Supporting Actress, Drama	Game of Thrones	Won	
2017	Kids Choice Awards	Favorite Squad	X-Men: Apocalypse	Nominated	
2019	Saturn Award	Best Supporting Actress on Television	Game of Thrones	Nominated	
2019	Teen Choice Awards	Choice Sci-Fi/Fantasy Movie Actress	Dark Phoenix	Nominated	
