= Heyday Films =

British film and television production company

Heyday Films Limited
- Logo used since 2008
- Type: Private
- Industry: Film • Television
- Founded: 1997; 29 years ago
- Founder: David Heyman
- Headquarters: United Kingdom
- Products: Harry Potter film series
- Services: Film production Television production
- Owner: David Heyman
- Divisions: Heyday Television

Heyday Films Limited is a British film and television production company founded in 1997 by producer David Heyman. The company made its feature film debut with Ravenous (1999), and is most successful for producing the Harry Potter film series, based on the series of popular fantasy novels of the same name by J. K. Rowling. In 2025, Amazon MGM Studios announced that Heyman and Amy Pascal would oversee the franchise moving forward and produce future installments in the James Bond film series through their Pascal Pictures and Heyday Films banners, respectively.

== History ==
Heyday Films Limited began in 1997 by producer David Heyman, after Heyman returned to England from the US. The company was initially funded by Warner Bros. Pictures with a first-look deal at the studio. The company signed its first deals, with Darren Ballie, to script three pictures.

In 1999, the company, along with Warner Bros., bought out the film rights of the Harry Potter series, and became the company's breakthrough hit after the first film was released in 2001 and became successful.

In 2015, the company launched their television division, Heyday Television as a joint venture with NBCUniversal International Studios.

In August 2026, Heyday signed a multi-year first-look film deal with Amazon MGM Studios.

== Filmography ==
=== Feature films ===
Year	Title	Director	Distributor(s)	Budget	Gross	Notes
1999	Ravenous	Antonia Bird	20th Century Fox	$12 million	$2 million	
2001	Harry Potter and the Philosopher's Stone	Chris Columbus	Warner Bros. Pictures	$125 million	$1.024 billion	Nominated - BAFTA Award for Outstanding British Film
2002	Harry Potter and the Chamber of Secrets	Chris Columbus	Warner Bros. Pictures	$100 million	$879 million	
2004	Harry Potter and the Prisoner of Azkaban	Alfonso Cuarón	Warner Bros. Pictures	$130 million	$796.7 million	
2005	Harry Potter and the Goblet of Fire	Mike Newell	Warner Bros. Pictures	$150 million	$897 million	Nominated - BAFTA Award for Outstanding British Film
2007	Harry Potter and the Order of the Phoenix	David Yates	Warner Bros. Pictures	$150 million	$942 million	
2007	I Am Legend	Francis Lawrence	Warner Bros. Pictures / Roadshow Entertainment	$150 million	$585.3 million	
2008	The Boy in the Striped Pyjamas	Mark Herman	Miramax	$12.5 million	$44 million	
2008	Is Anybody There?	John Crowley	Optimum Releasing	—N/a	$3 million	
2008	Yes Man	Peyton Reed	Warner Bros. Pictures	$70 million	$223.2 million	
2009	Harry Potter and the Half-Blood Prince	David Yates	Warner Bros. Pictures	$250 million	$934.4 million	
2010	Harry Potter and the Deathly Hallows – Part 1	David Yates	Warner Bros. Pictures	$250 million	$976.3 million	
2011	Harry Potter and the Deathly Hallows – Part 2	David Yates	Warner Bros. Pictures	$250 million	$1.342 billion	
2013	We're the Millers	Rawson Marshall Thurber	Warner Bros. Pictures / New Line Cinema	$37 million	$270 million	
2013	Gravity	Alfonso Cuarón	Warner Bros. Pictures	$100 million	$723.2 million	Nominated - Academy Award for Best Picture; Nominated - BAFTA Award for Best Film
2014	Testament of Youth	James Kent	Lionsgate	$10 million	$5.3 million	
2014	Paddington	Paul King	StudioCanal / TWC-Dimension	$55 million	$268 million	Nominated - BAFTA Award for Outstanding British Film
2016	The Light Between Oceans	Derek Cianfrance	Walt Disney Studios Motion Pictures	$20 million	$23.5 million	
2016	Fantastic Beasts and Where to Find Them	David Yates	Warner Bros. Pictures	$180 million	$814 million	Nominated - BAFTA Award for Outstanding British Film
2017	Paddington 2	Paul King	StudioCanal / Warner Bros. Pictures	$40 million	$227 million	
2018	Fantastic Beasts: The Crimes of Grindelwald	David Yates	Warner Bros. Pictures	$200 million	$654 million	
2019	Once Upon a Time in Hollywood	Quentin Tarantino	Sony Pictures Releasing	$100 million	$366 million	Golden Globe Award for Best Motion Picture – Musical or Comedy; Nominated - Academy Award for Best Picture; Nominated - BAFTA Award for Best Film
2019	Marriage Story	Noah Baumbach	Netflix	$18 million	$2.3 million	Nominated - Academy Award for Best Picture; Nominated - Golden Globe Award for Best Motion Picture – Drama
2020	The Secret Garden	Marc Munden	StudioCanal	$20 million	$8.7 million	
2022	Fantastic Beasts: The Secrets of Dumbledore	David Yates	Warner Bros. Pictures	$200 million	$407.2 million	
2022	White Noise	Noah Baumbach	Netflix	$100 million	$79,040	
2023	Barbie	Greta Gerwig	Warner Bros. Pictures	$145 million	$1.446 billion	Nominated - Academy Award for Best Picture; Nominated - Golden Globe Award for Best Motion Picture – Musical or Comedy
2023	Wonka	Paul King	Warner Bros. Pictures	$125 million	$634.4 million	
2025	Jay Kelly	Noah Baumbach	Netflix			
2026	The Rivals of Amziah King	Andrew Patterson	Black Bear Pictures		$3.7 million	
2026	Klara and the Sun	Taika Waititi	Sony Pictures Releasing	$20-44.3 million	$3 million	
2026	Artificial	Luca Guadagnino	Neon	$40 million		
2027	F.A.S.T.	Ben Richardson	Warner Bros. Pictures			

=== Television productions ===
==== Television films ====
Year	Title	Credit	Notes
2010	Awkward Situations for Men	Executive producer	
2011	Page Eight		
2013	The Thirteenth Tale		
2014	Turks & Caicos	Executive producer	
2014	Salting the Battlefield	Executive producer	

==== Television series ====
Heyday have produced a number of television series.

Year	Title	Co-production(s)	Network	Ref.
2005–2006	Threshold	Paramount Network Television; Phantom Four Films; Braga Productions	CBS	
2018	The Long Song		BBC One	
2019	The InBetween	Universal Television; Look at My New Bag	NBC	
2019–2022	The Capture	NBCUniversal International Studios	BBC One	
2019–2025	The Adventures of Paddington	StudioCanal; Blue Zoo Animation Studio; Superprod Studio	Nickelodeon	
2021	Clickbait	NBCUniversal International Studios; Matchbox Pictures; Tony Ayres Productions	Netflix	
2024	Apples Never Fall	Universal Content Productions; Universal International Studios; Matchbox Pictures; Call Me Mel Productions Inc.	Peacock	
2026–present	Harry Potter	Warner Bros. Television; Brontë Film and Television	HBO	
