= Cameron Mitchell (singer) =

American singer-songwriter (born 1990)

- Born: February 15, 1990 (age 36)
- Origin: Colleyville, Texas, U.S.
- Genres: Indie rock, alternative, pop
- Years active: 2010–present
- Label: Independent

Robert Cameron Mitchell (born February 15, 1990), professionally credited as Cameron Mitchell, is an American singer-songwriter from Colleyville, Texas. He is best known for his role on the reality television series The Glee Project. Mitchell received attention for choosing to leave the competition, then returning to win the Bing Fan Favorite at the end of the season. Mitchell says he has been influenced by John Mayer and The Beatles.

== The Glee Project ==
Mitchell was introduced on the debut season of the Oxygen reality series The Glee Project, He was chosen to be in the Top 12 after making it through the Fort Worth, Texas auditions in January 2011. He was later picked, to his surprise, as one of the show's twelve competitors. Mitchell said it was the first time he had auditioned for anything, and went into the show with no acting background.

You just have to follow what you believe and believe that when one door closes, another door opens and it's only going to lead to great things. I don't regret it.

— Cameron Mitchell, following his decision to quit The Glee Project

Mitchell departed The Glee Project after the show's seventh episode, titled "Sexuality", after struggling with his own religious beliefs and the titular theme. In addition to struggling with the sexual themes of the show, Mitchell also cited his lack of acting experience as part of his decision to leave. During a personal conversation with Glee co-creator, writer and producer Ryan Murphy, he admitted that he had been considering leaving the competition for some time. Murphy, who said that Mitchell "could have gone all the way to the finals", revealed that by leaving, Mitchell's close friend and fellow competitor Damian McGinty was saved from elimination for that episode. McGinty later won the competition, along with Samuel Larsen. Despite leaving the competition, Mitchell has said that auditioning for the series was "the best decision [he] ever made" and that he does not regret leaving mid-season.

=== Auditions ===
Mitchell auditioned for The Glee Project in the Dallas/Fort Worth casting call in Texas. During the audition, he sang his original song entitled "Love Can Wait". Casting director Robert J. Ulrich was impressed with his audition and said that Mitchell was "one of his favorites so far" because he was "unique and there was no one like him on Glee". Mitchell was selected as one of the top 80 contestants and was called back to Los Angeles where a masterclass and final auditions were held to select the final 12. After a series of dance lessons and singing lessons with Zach Woodlee, Nikki Anders and Robert J. Ulrich, the three mentors had final auditions to choose the Top 12. Ulrich later video-called Mitchell to congratulate him and the other 11 contestants who had been successfully selected for the show.

=== Bing Fan Favorite ===
During the final episode of The Glee Project it was announced that Mitchell was the winner of Bing Fan Favorite, an online voting portion of the competition that was decided on by fans. The prize for winning Fan Favorite was $10,000 and the chance to perform in a solo music video on oxygen.com. For the video performance, Mitchell chose instead to perform a duet, "Haven't Met You Yet", with friend and fellow contestant Damian McGinty. In this same video, Mitchell stated that he would use his winnings to pay for an apartment which he plans to share with McGinty.

=== RVRB ===
In 2015, Cameron created his artist project, RVRB, and released "Faded – EP". In 2016, RVRB released two more singles and went on to perform at SXSW in 2017.

== Discography ==
Mitchell, a guitar player, says he enjoys writing songs, often about girls, one of which he performed on The Glee Project. He is currently unsigned. On May 1, 2010, he released his first extended play, Love Can Wait EP.

In October 2011, Cameron released a single, "Not Going Home", on iTunes. He is currently writing and hopes to put out a second album in the future.

In December 2011, Cameron posted a song on YouTube entitled "All My Love"

In December 2012, Cameron released a Christmas EP, "For You", on iTunes.
