= Phoenix Raei =

Australian actor

- Born: 28 October 1990 (age 35); Shiraz, Iran
- Occupations: Actor, director
- Notable work: Clickbait
- Partner: Kate Lister

Phoenix Raei is an Australian actor, director, and producer. He was a main cast member of the two-season TV soap The Heights (2018–2019). He starred in the 2021 Netflix series Clickbait, and had a pivotal role in the 2023 Netflix series The Night Agent.

== Early life and education ==
Phoenix Raei was born in Shiraz, Iran on 28 October 1990. He emigrated with his family to Australia and settled in Perth. He showed interest in acting at an early age, but felt pressured to pursue higher education, so he studied law.

== Career ==
Raei first appeared in a short film in 2014. He chose the stage name Nima Raei and used it for Seven Storeys Down, a 2017 film that he wrote and directed. Raei's television debut was in the Australian soccer show Mustangs FC, He played his first major role in the 2017 film Australia Day, and wrote and directed a miniseries, Murder. He thereafter relocated to Melbourne. In 2018, Raei appeared in the Australian political thriller series Romper Stomper, based on the 1992 Russell Crowe film of the same name. In 2019 he featured in the Australian prison-drama series Wentworth.

He was a main cast member of the Perth two-season TV soap The Heights (2018-2019). In 2020, he appeared in Stateless, a series about detention centres in Australia created by Cate Blanchett.

Raei also co-starred in the 2021 Netflix miniseries Clickbait alongside Zoe Kazan, Betty Gabriel, and Adrian Grenier. In Clickbait, Raei plays the role of Roshan Amiri, a missing persons detective investigating a highly publicised murder.

He had a pivotal role in the Netflix series The Night Agent. He appeared in Black Site, an American action-thriller film released in 2022, and he is working on a self-authored, directed, and produced film, Schnook.

In 2023, he took part in season three of the Apple TV+ thriller series Tehran. In 2024, Raei was named in the cast for series 3 of The Twelve.

== Personal life ==
Raei is engaged to Australian actress Kate Lister. They have two daughters together.

The two have collaborated on various projects, and together they manage a production company, Little Fish Films.

== Filmography ==
=== Film ===
Year	Title	Role	Notes
2014	Son of a Gun	Party Guest (uncredited)	
2014	Pale Blue Eyes	Diner Patron #4	Short film
2015	Bizness Boiz	Cucumber Guy	Short film
2015	Indefinite	Adar	
2017	Australia Day	Yaghoub Ghaznavi	
2017	7 Storeys Down	Beau	
2017	Romeo	Mercuccio	
2019	Below	Azad	
2022	Black Site	Uri Wasserman	
2023	The Rooster	Dan	

=== Television ===
Year	Title	Role	Notes
2017	Mustangs FC	Lachy	2 episodes
2018	Romper Stomper	Amir	Miniseries; 3 episodes
2018–2019	Wentworth	Lukas	Seasons 6–7; 2 episodes
2019–2020	The Heights	Ash Jafari	Seasons 1–2; 60 episodes
2020	Stateless	Javad Shahrokh	Miniseries; 5 episodes
2021	Clickbait	Roshan Amiri	Miniseries; 8 episodes
2023	The Night Agent	Dale	Season 1; 10 episodes
2023	Love Me	Johan	Season 2; 2 episodes
2024–present	Tehran	Ramin Ghasemi	Season 3–present; 5 episodes
2025	Apple Cider Vinegar	Hek	Miniseries; 5 episodes
2025	The Twelve	Bassam Aziz	Season 3; 8 episodes

=== As director / writer ===
Year	Title	Role	Ref
2017	7 Storeys Down	Director / writer	Feature film
2017–2018	Murder	Director / writer	Miniseries
TBA	Rotten	Director	Film – in post-production
TBA	Shnook	Director / writer	Short film – in post-production
TBA	Paradise	Co-director	In development

== Recognition and awards ==
In 2019, he was the recipient of the Casting Guild of Australia, Rising Star Award.
