= Holeg Spies =

French composer and music producer

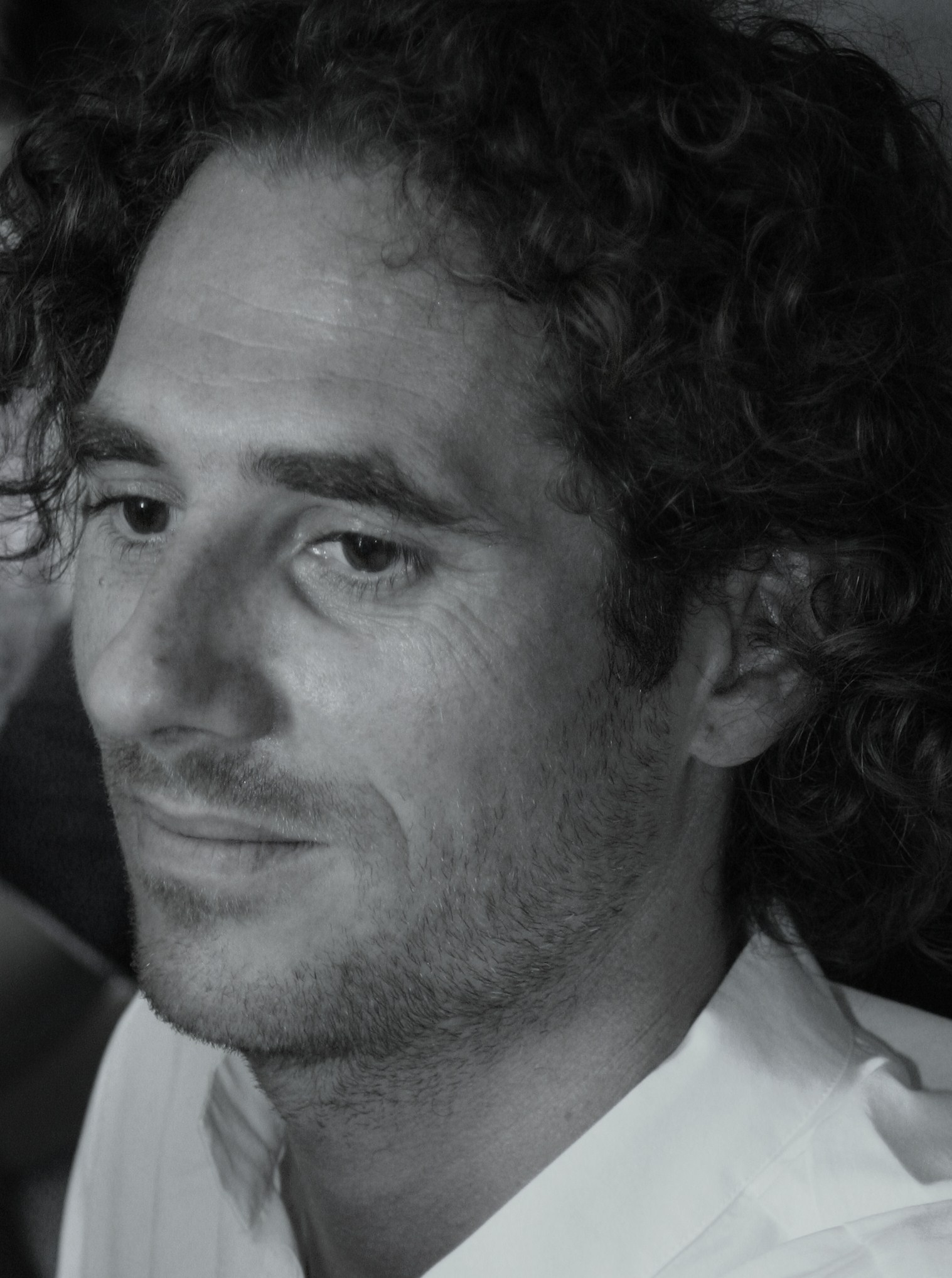
Image of Holeg Spies

Holeg Spies is a French composer and music producer known for his work in film scores, electronic music, and in multiple musical collaborations. His music typically draws on diverse musical elements, often blending electronic, musique concrete, Indigenous music and orchestral elements to create unique and atmospheric soundscapes. Spies has also composed scores for movies, television, and multimedia projects.

In the early 90s Holeg Spies was one of the first wave of DJs in the European underground techno scene. He also headlined the first techno tour of India in 1995 and then multiple tours of Japan, from 1997 onward.

Holeg Spies approaches music and sound as living organisms that constantly interact with their environment. He defines this concept as "Ecophonism", an artistic approach in which space becomes a co-composer and the listener a sonic inhabitant within the musical process.

As a film composer, he has collaborated on multiple scores with Patrick Savage, including the 2009 cult horror film The Human Centipede (First Sequence), and the award-winning Abruptio. Together they have often been credited as "Savage & Spies"

== Filmography ==
- Trial 22
- Abruptio (director Evan Marlowe, starring James Marsters, Jordan Peele, Robert Englund)
- Hairy
- Black Site (director Sophia Banks, starring Jason Clarke, Michelle Monaghan, Jai Courtney)
- Seeing Red
- Hex
- Soundtrack to 16
- Selling Isobel (retitled Apartment 407)
- Purple Heather
- The Raven Club
- The Outsider (starring James Caan, Shannon Elizabeth, Craig Fairbrass, Jason Patric, directed by Brian A Miller)
- Abruptio (director, Evan Marlowe)
- Stolen Light
- Asylum 108
- Se vende perro que habla, 10 euros
- Dead End
- LA I Hate You (additional music)
- American Maniacs
- Holy Monks (animated television series)
- Jack of Diamonds (television film)
- The Human Centipede (First Sequence)
- Shadowland
- The Ugly File
- I Do
- Peekers
- A Jamais

== Discography ==
- Savage & Spies: Seeing Red, Bucks Music Group, 2025, UK
- Holeg Spies: Two-legged Clarinet - Bucks Music Group, 2025, UK
- Holeg Spies: Lady L. - Remixes - Liquid Sound Design, 2024, UK
- Holeg Spies: Brave New World - 3xCDs – 1xDVD Multipack - Liquid Sound Design, 2024, UK
- Holeg Spies: Huxley’s Medicine - Remixes - Liquid Sound Design, 2024, UK
- Holeg Spies: Brave New World - Vinyl Edition - Liquid Sound Design, 2023, UK
- Phages: We Are - Psy-Harmonics, 2023, Australia
- Holeg Spies: Notinism.org - Remixes - Liquid Sound Design, 2023, UK
- Megan Rutherford & Holeg Spies: Wrong feels right - DNA Music, 2023, UK
- Savage & Spies: Black Site, Lakeshore Entertainment, 2022, USA
- Holeg Spies: Axis Mundi Reload, Vinyl Edition, Liquid Sound Design, 2022, UK
- Jaia & Holeg Spies: Discode, Dragonfly/Cinetiks, 2021, UK
- Holeg Spies: Pagans, Liquid Sound Design/Cinetiks, 2021, UK
- Holeg Spies: Supramyth, Liquid Sound Design/Cinetiks, 2021, UK
- Holeg Spies & Jaia: Rain, Dragonfly/Cinetiks, 2021, UK
- Savage & Spies: The Human Centipede (First Sequence), AMS/Six Entertainment, 2021, Italy/Netherlands
- Holeg Spies with Thierry Gotti: Urban Resilience, Liquid Sound Design/Big Life, 2021, UK
- Holeg Spies with Mona Soyoc: One of the Kind, cover for feature film Heckle, Cinetiks/Universal, 2021, UK
- Holeg Spies with Tim Schuldt: Asylum, Cinetiks 2020, UK
- Savage & Spies: Open Land, Cinetiks, 2020, UK
- Deedrah & Holeg Spies: Sunrise, Perfecto, 2020, USA
- Jaia & Holeg Spies: Discode, Cinetiks, 2020, UK
- Jaia & Holeg Spies: Wat Hex, Perfecto, 2019, USA
- Savage & Spies: Hex, Cinetiks, 2019, UK
- Holeg Spies: Axis Mundi, Cinetiks, 2019, UK
- Savage & Spies: Le Chemin des Juifs, Cinetiks, 2019, UK
- Savage & Spies: The Road to Freedom Peak Cinetiks, 2019, UK
- Holeg Spies – Jaia – Thierry Gotti: Nightrun, Cinetiks, 2017, UK
- Disa vs Olowex: Beautiful Ones, Tigerspring/Sony, 2017, Denmark
- Savage & Spies: The Outsider, Cinetiks, 2015, UK
- Savage & Spies: Dead End, Cinetiks, 2015, UK
- Savage & Spies: Purple Heather, Cinetiks|2015|UK
- Vedama & Spies: Photonic, DAT, 2015, Italy
- Savage & Spies: Stolen Light, Cinetiks, 2014, UK
- Savage & Spies: American Maniacs, Cinetiks, 2013, UK
- Ariel Electron – Holeg Spies – Thierry Gotti: Kore Kosmou, Cinetiks/Howlin’Wolf, 2012, UK/USA
- Holeg Spies: The Flute is Calling Cinetiks, 2012, UK
- Holeg Spies: Best of 2000-2010, Cinetiks, 2010, UK
- Holeg Spies: Tanz-Demokratur Cinetiks/Mechanical Dragon, 2007, UK/Hong Kong
- Holeg Spies & Von Magnet: SUVMI, Cinetiks/Celestial Dragon, 2006, UK/Hong Kong
- Holeg Spies & Von Magnet: Shape your Shade, Cinetiks/ThisCo/Celestial Dragon|2006, France, Portugal, Hong Kong
- Holeg Spies: Lost in Darkness, Citizen, 2005, France
- Spies: Notinism re-edition and remixes, Wirikuta, 2003, Austria
- Holeg & The Spies: Reality Drift, Wirikuta, 2003, Austria
- Holeg & The Spies: God is not Goth, Aurinko, 2001, Germany
- Spies: Notinism, TechnoFlux/Flatline-Antzen/Metropolis, 2000, Japan, Germany, USA
- Spies: Notinista, TechnoFlux/Flatline, 1999, Japan/Germany
- Spies: Wide Shot, Aurinko, 1999, Germany
- Spies: Psychosis, Organic, 1998, UK
- Spies: Ceremoniak, Transient, 1997, UK
- Karmic Energies: Equal & Surpass, Vivid/Polygram, 1996, France
- Karmic Energies: Born to be wild, Vivid/Polygram,1996, France
- Karmic Energies: Bonobo Vivid/Polygram, 1996, France
- Holeg & LorenX: Holegator, Trans’Pact, 1994, France

== Published books ==
- Echoes of Origins, publisher Signal Zero, 2026, France
- Goa Trance, publisher Signal Zero, 2024, France
- An introduction to Goa Trance, publisher Dragonfly, 2026, UK
