= Australia Day (film) =

- Australian release poster
- Directed by: Kriv Stenders
- Written by: Stephen M. Irwin
- Produced by: Nathan Mayfield; Leigh McGrath; Tracey Robertson; Edward Herbert
- Starring: Bryan Brown; Shari Sebbens; Sean Keenan; Daniel Webber; Elias Anton; Jenny Wu; Phoenix Raei; Isabelle Cornish; Ernie Dingo; Neveen Hanna; Chris Haywood; Neil Pigot; Diana Lin; Matthew Le Nevez; Miah Madden
- Cinematography: Geoffrey Hall
- Edited by: Nick Meyers
- Music by: Matteo Zingales
- Production companies: Foxtel; Screen Australia; Screen Queensland; Hoodlum Entertainment
- Distributed by: Icon Film Distribution; Dendy Cinemas
- Release date: 12 June 2017
- Running time: 98 minutes
- Country: Australia
- Language: English

Australia Day is a 2017 Australian drama anthology film directed by Kriv Stenders and starring Bryan Brown.

== Premise ==
On Australia Day, three Australians from different cultural backgrounds will cross paths, creating racial tension and national identity issues that simmer underneath the surface of modern-day Australia.

== Cast ==
- Bryan Brown as Terry Friedman
- Shari Sebbens as Sonya Mackenzie
- Sean Keenan as Dean Patterson
- Isabelle Cornish as Chloe Patterson
- Daniel Webber as Jason Patterson
- Ernie Dingo as Floyd Mackenzie
- Elias Anton as Sami Ghaznavi
- Kee Chan as Zhou Chong
- Sam Cotton as Constable Buchanan
- Matthew Le Nevez as Detective Mitchell Collyer
- Caroline Dunphy as Patricia Kendall
- Simon Elrahi as Karim
- Yasmin Honeychurch as Kaytee Tucker
- Miah Madden as April Tucker
- Phoenix Raei as Yaghoub Ghaznavi
- John Brumpton as Les Yebery

== Reception ==
Australia Day received mixed reviews from critics and audiences, earning a 57% approval rating on Rotten Tomatoes.

David Stratton of The Australian gave a positive review, calling the film "Run Lola Run meets Gran Torino; breathtakingly fast-moving, a very well-made thriller." Erin Free of FILMINK also gave a positive review, calling the film "a big, broiling stew of complex thought, Australia Day is a provocative, intelligent film that dares to pick, probe and ask a lot of burning questions."

Alex Lines of Film Inquiry gave a negative review, saying the film "is a series of predictable story arcs, rudimentary characters and simplistic viewpoints on racism." Vicky Roach of The Daily Telegraph wrote that the story "is carried along by the momentum of its characters. But when they run out of steam, so does the screenplay."

=== Accolades ===
Award	Category	Subject	Result
AACTA Award (7th)	Best Editing	Nick Meyers	Nominated
FCCA Award	Best Actor	Bryan Brown	Nominated
