= Abraham Lim (actor) =

American actor

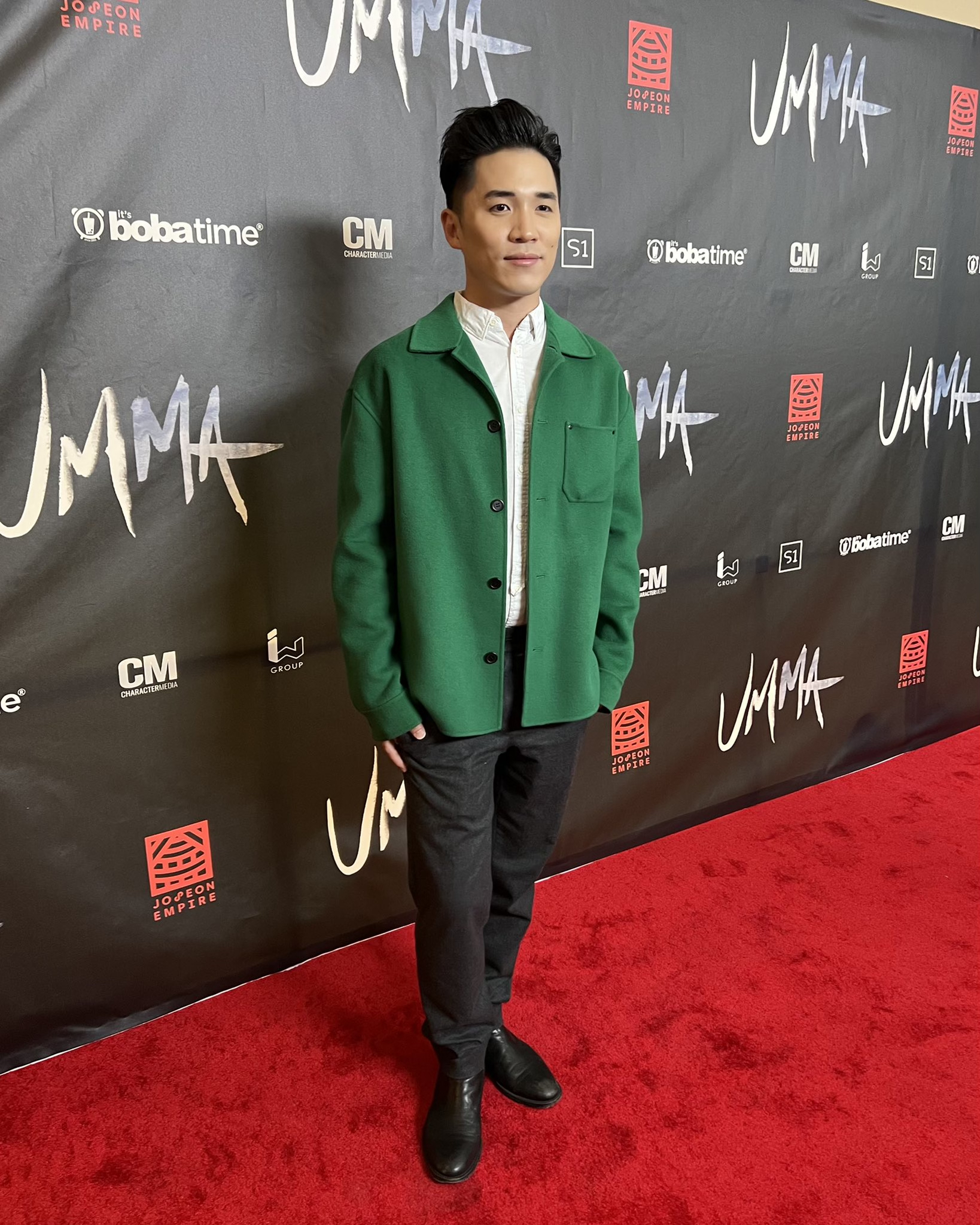
- Lim at the premiere of the film Umma
- Born: November 9
- Occupations: Actor, singer
- Years active: 2012–present

Abraham Lim is an American actor and singer most known for his portrayal of Ben Park on Netflix's Clickbait and as Kenji Miyashiro on Amazon's The Boys.

It was announced that Lim would be originating the role of 'Jae Ik' on the Broadway opening of the musical KPOP, which opened in Fall, 2022. Additionally, Deadline reported that Lim would star in the Netflix animated series Exploding Kittens, but he dropped out during development.

== Early life ==
Lim is a second-generation Korean American. He was born in Queens, New York, and also has lived in San Diego, California. He was a political science and international studies double major who was set to go to law school when he decided to focus on the performing arts instead.

Lim got his initial break on The Glee Project, where he was the 8th contestant eliminated before segueing into traditional film and television. He was the first Asian-American to be cast in the series.

== Filmography ==
=== Television ===
Year	Title	Role	Notes
2012	The Glee Project	Self	8th contestant eliminated
2013	Welcome to the Family	Frat Brother	1 episode
2013	The Crazy Ones	Mike	1 episode
2013	Faking It	Nate	1 episode
2015	How to Get Away with Murder	Byron	1 episode
2015–16	Grandfathered	Ian	4 episodes
2016	Filthy Preppy Teen$	President Gober	1 episode
2016	Better Things	Alex	2 episodes
2016	The Real O'Neals	Rob	1 episode
2016	Chicago P.D.	Tony Chin	1 episode
2017	The Catch	Jesse Takashi	2 episodes
2017	Famous in Love	Tyler	1 episode
2017	Relationship Status	Paul	3 episodes
2018	Charmed	Chip	1 episode
2018–19	The Dead Girls Detective Agency	Bobby Bryer	6 episodes
2019	The Rookie	Jonah	1 episode
2019	The Fix	Ares Ahn	3 episodes
2020	The Boys	Kenji Miyashiro	4 episodes
2021	Clickbait	Ben Park	6 episodes (main cast)
2022	NCIS: Hawaiʻi	Blake	1 episode
2024	CSI: Vegas	Eric Chang	1 episode
2025	Ballard	Mr. Kim	1 episode

=== Film ===
Year	Title	Role	Notes
2015	Hello, My Name Is Doris	Kris	
2016	The Wedding Party	Sean	
2016	Inconceivable	Pete Ferguson	
2017	Gemini	Seo-Jin	
2017	The Circle	Circler	

=== Theatre ===
Year	Title	Role	Notes
2022	KPOP	Jae Ik	Broadway original cast
