= Upgrade (film) =

2018 film by Leigh Whannell

- Theatrical release poster
- Directed by: Leigh Whannell
- Written by: Leigh Whannell
- Produced by: Jason Blum; Kylie Du Fresne; Brian Kavanaugh-Jones
- Starring: Logan Marshall-Green; Betty Gabriel; Harrison Gilbertson
- Cinematography: Stefan Duscio
- Edited by: Andy Canny
- Music by: Jed Palmer
- Production companies: Blumhouse Productions; Goalpost Pictures; Nervous Tick Productions; Film Victoria; Automatik
- Distributed by: OTL Releasing; BH Tilt (United States); Madman Entertainment (Australia)
- Release dates: 10 March 2018 (SXSW); 1 June 2018 (United States); 14 June 2018 (Australia)
- Running time: 100 minutes
- Countries: Australia; United States
- Language: English
- Budget: $3 million
- Box office: $17 million

Upgrade is a 2018 action thriller film written and directed by Leigh Whannell, and starring Logan Marshall-Green, Betty Gabriel, and Harrison Gilbertson. Upgrade follows a technophobe who is implanted with a chip that allows him to control his body after a mugging left him paralyzed. The cyberpunk film was produced by Jason Blum, under his Blumhouse Productions banner.

After premiering on 10 March 2018 at South by Southwest, Upgrade was released on 1 June 2018 in the United States by OTL Releasing and Blumhouse Tilt, and on 14 June in Australia. The film made $17 million on a $3 million budget and received positive reviews from critics, who called it "one part The Six Million Dollar Man, one part Death Wish revenge fantasy", and praised its dark humor and action sequences.

== Plot ==
In 2046, Grey Trace, an auto mechanic, lives with his wife Asha who works for Cobalt, one of the companies contributing to human-computer augmentations. Grey asks Asha to help him return a refurbished car to his client Eron Keen, a renowned tech innovator. While visiting his home, Eron reveals his latest creation, a chip called STEM that can manage a human’s motor functions.

Returning home, Grey and Asha's self-driving car malfunctions and crashes. Four men kill Asha and shoot Grey in the neck, severing his spinal cord. Grey returns home months later as a wheelchair-using quadriplegic, under the care of his mother, Pamela. Asha's death and the inability of det. Cortez to identify their attackers causes Grey to sink into depression. After a suicide attempt, he is visited by Eron, who convinces him to accept a STEM implant.

Grey regains control of his limbs and Eron has Grey sign a non-disclosure agreement, requiring Grey to pretend to still be paralyzed. While looking through a drone video feed of his wife's murder, Grey hears STEM speak in his mind. STEM says it can help Grey get revenge and quickly identifies one of the assailants, Serk Brantner, from the video.

Grey breaks into Serk's home and finds proof Serk was "upgraded" through a secret military experiment, also connecting Serk to a local bar called the Old Bones. Serk arrives and attacks Grey, but STEM convinces Grey to temporarily give up control of his body, allowing STEM to turn Grey into a lethally efficient fighting machine, killing Serk with little effort. Cortez later sees drone footage of Grey’s wheelchair approaching Serk’s house, but his perceived paralysis negates him as a suspect.

Eron has tracked STEM's movements and berates Grey for his vigilantism. Grey reveals STEM is speaking to him, which surprises Eron, who demands that Grey stop his investigation.

Grey proceeds to the Old Bones and finds Tolan, another of the assailants. Grey allows STEM to torture Tolan to death, first getting the name of the assailants' ringleader, Fisk. Leaving the bar, Grey stumbles, and STEM informs him that Eron is attempting to shut them down remotely. STEM directs Grey to a nearby hacker, Jamie, who manages to remove STEM's input guard, then leaves just as Fisk arrives. Grey, with STEM's control restored, kills Fisk's companion.

Grey returns home only for Pamela to see him walking, forcing him to reveal STEM's existence. Cortez arrives to interrogate them after finding Grey's wheelchair suspiciously abandoned at the Old Bones; she leaves after planting a listening device on Grey's jacket. Grey wishes to give up the hunt, but STEM explains that Fisk will track them down and kill them. STEM reveals that the hack gives it free control of Grey’s body. STEM uses Grey to drive to Fisk, causing an automated car to malfunction and crash into Cortez, who is tailing them. Cortez returns to Grey's home, where Pamela explains STEM.

Grey and STEM find Fisk, who reveals he was only hired to paralyze Grey so he could be implanted. Fisk's own upgrades outpace Grey's movements. Grey taunts Fisk with the death of Serk, his brother, allowing STEM to gain the upper hand and kill Fisk. Fisk's phone reveals messages from Eron, suggesting he orchestrated all the events.

Grey storms Eron's home, killing all personnel in his path, but is held at gunpoint by Cortez before he can kill Eron. Eron confesses how STEM forced him to do its bidding, having long since come to dominate all aspects of Eron's life in pursuit of its goal to become human. STEM kills Eron and attempts to kill Cortez, but Grey fights for control over his own body, managing to stab himself in the hand and apparently shooting himself.

Grey wakes up in a hospital room, not paralyzed. Asha explains he has been unconscious for two days following their crash. In reality, Grey is still in Eron's home. STEM, in full control, explains to Cortez that the psychological strain has finally broken Grey's mind; this was STEM's objective all along, as this allowed it to assume control over Grey's mind and body. Grey's consciousness believes the idyllic dream state it has found, while STEM kills Cortez and leaves.

== Cast ==
- Logan Marshall-Green as Grey Trace
- Betty Gabriel as Detective Cortez
- Harrison Gilbertson as Eron Keen
- Melanie Vallejo as Asha Trace
- Benedict Hardie as Fisk Brantner
- Linda Cropper as Pamela
- Simon Maiden as the voice of STEM
- Richard Cawthorne as Serk Brantner
- Christopher Kirby as Tolan
- Kai Bradley as Jamie

== Production ==
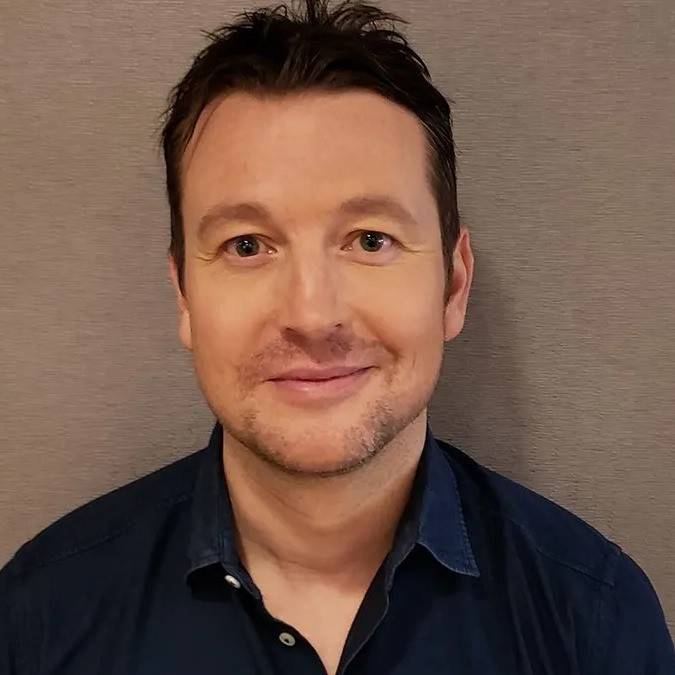
Writer and director Leigh Whannell

The film was originally titled STEM. Whannell wrote the first draft at least six years before making the film. According to Whannell, the film was inspired by films such as RoboCop, Total Recall, and The Terminator. Principal photography on the film began in March 2017 in Whannell's hometown of Melbourne. The chase scene taking place on the southern section of the Craigieburn bypass Hume Freeway (M31) goes the opposite direction to what would have been normal traffic flow to appear that it was filmed in a left hand drive country. Editing took place in Sydney.

Logan Marshall-Green based Grey's movement while under STEM's control on that of the character Zenyatta in the video game Overwatch.

Cinematographer Stefan Duscio shot the film with Arri Alexa XT and Alexa Mini cameras and Panavision C- and E-Series anamorphic lenses. The unusual camerawork during the fight scenes was achieved by attaching a phone to Marshall-Green and having the Alexa Mini track the gyroscope of the phone.

== Release ==
After premiering on 10 March 2018 at South by Southwest and winning the Midnighters Award, the film was released on 1 June in the United States, and 14 June in Australia by Blumhouse Tilt.

Upgrade is set up for retail in two packages, Blu-ray with Digital HD and DVD on 28 August 2018.

The film received a 4k Ultra HD + Blu-ray release on 4 July 2023.

== Reception ==
=== Box office ===
In the United States and Canada, Upgrade was released on 1 June 2018, alongside Adrift and Action Point, and was projected to gross around $3 million from 1,457 theaters in its opening weekend. It ended up debuting slightly above estimates with $4.6 million and finished sixth at the box office. It was the second best opening for a BH Tilt film, after The Darkness' $4.95 million in 2016. It made $2.2 million in its second weekend, finishing ninth.

=== Critical response ===
On Rotten Tomatoes, the film has an approval rating of 88% based on 193 reviews, with an average rating of 7.3/10. The website's critical consensus reads, "Like its augmented protagonist, Upgrade's old-fashioned innards get a high-tech boost—one made even more powerful thanks to sharp humor and a solidly well-told story." On Metacritic, the film has a weighted average score of 67 out of 100, based on 33 critics, indicating "generally favorable reviews". Audiences polled by PostTrak gave the film a 78% overall positive score and a 46% "definite recommend".

In The Sunday Times (UK) Ed Potton muses, "apart from a few flimsy special effects... this is a satire that cleaves dangerously close to reality at times." Emily Yoshida, writing for New York magazine's blog Vulture, said, "A great and grimy little screw-turner of sci-fi schlock, the kind that they truly don't make anymore, the kind that would make Carpenter and Cameron proud." In a less positive review, Charles Bramesco of The Guardian said, "While Whannell wrestles with warring desires to fret over the techno oblivion we're hurtling towards or have a laugh about it, that conflict manifests in a disappointing tonal clash that robs the film of the low-rent fun it could be having."

=== Accolades ===
Award	Date of ceremony	Category	Recipients	Result	Ref.
AACTA Awards	3 December 2018	Best Original Screenplay	Leigh Whannell	Nominated	
AACTA Awards	3 December 2018	Best Editing	Andy Canny	Nominated	
AACTA Awards	3 December 2018	Best Original Music Score	Jed Palmer	Nominated	
AACTA Awards	3 December 2018	Best Sound	Will Files, P.K. Hooker, Andrew Ramage	Nominated	
AACTA Awards	3 December 2018	Best Production Design	Felicity Abbott, Katie Sharrock	Nominated	
AACTA Awards	3 December 2018	Best Visual Effects or Animation	Kate Bernauer, Aevar Bjarnason, Matt Daly, Jonathan Dearing, Angelo Sahin	Nominated	
AACTA Awards	3 December 2018	Best Hair and Makeup	Larry Van Duynhoven, Chiara Tripodi	Nominated	
Fangoria Chainsaw Awards	25 February 2019	Best Wide Release	Leigh Whannell	Nominated	
Fangoria Chainsaw Awards	25 February 2019	Best Actor	Logan Marshall-Green	Nominated	
Saturn Award	13 September 2019	Best Science Fiction Film		Nominated	
SXSW Film Awards	13 March 2018	Audience Award – Midnighters	Leigh Whannell	Won	

== Television series ==
Leigh Whannell explained that the film was written as a standalone film without any expectations of a sequel. Based on prerelease tracking, Whannell said a sequel was unlikely.

On 16 August 2018, producer Jason Blum said he had plans for a potential sequel. In February 2020, Leigh Whannell expressed enthusiasm for making a follow-up, saying "I loved making that film, so I'd love to do it with a bit more money." Blum restated that he "would love an Upgrade sequel" and that although there were no immediate plans, it was something on both of their minds.

In May 2020, it was reported that the sequel was being reworked into a television series, with Whannell, in addition to directing the series, would co-create the series alongside Tim Walsh, who will serve as showrunner and both men will serve as executive producers. Blumhouse Television is set to produce the series alongside Universal Cable Productions, who have set up a writers room. The plot of the series is that it is set a few years after the events of the film, with an evolved version of STEM and new host, with the government using STEM as a way to curb criminal activity.

== See also ==
- List of body horror media
