= The Outsider (2014 film) =

2014 American film by Brian A. Miller

- DVD cover
- Directed by: Brian A. Miller
- Written by: Brian A. Miller
- Story by: Craig Fairbrass
- Produced by: Philip B. Goldfine; Christine Holder; Mark Holder
- Starring: Craig Fairbrass; James Caan; Shannon Elizabeth; Jason Patric; Melissa Ordway; Johnny Messner
- Cinematography: Eduardo Enrique Mayén
- Edited by: Bob Mori
- Music by: Patrick Savage; Holeg Spies
- Production companies: Oak Street Films; Zero Gravity Management
- Release date: February 7, 2014
- Running time: 94 minutes
- Country: United States
- Language: English

The Outsider is a 2014 American action crime drama film directed by Brian A. Miller and written by Craig Fairbrass. The film stars Craig Fairbrass, James Caan, Shannon Elizabeth, Jason Patric, Melissa Ordway, and Johnny Messner.

== Plot ==
Detective Klein and his team discover the dead body of a woman who he believes is Samantha Walker, the daughter of a military contractor known as Lex Walker. Lex is informed of the news and goes to his London apartment, with news the body will be shipped back to London. However, Walker is called back to LA to identify the corpse, and realises it is not Samantha, but one of her friends.

Lex calls Most Industries, where Samantha used to work, to see if they know anything about her disappearance, Lex speaks to Karl Schuster, the CEO, who states that she knows nothing about it. Unconvinced, Lex assaults the guards, leading to his arrest. Meanwhile, Schruster goes into a fit of rage and kills one of his own men for presumably compromising his shady dealings.

In a holding cell Lex meets Detective Klein, who releases him. Lex walks up to a bar where Samantha used to hang out and offers the bartender $10,000 for any information, but he refuses, leading to a fight. After the commotion dies down, Lex offers to pay the money, who he snatched back during the fight, to anyone with information, and a woman called Margo answers, stating she knows a nightclub where Samantha was involved.

Margo takes Lex to the club where she explains that Samantha hooked up with one of the members, Ricky Cummings, Lex confronts him but he runs away, when Lex catches Ricky. 3 of Schrusters men arrive but Lex shoots them all, and the trio of Lex,Margo and Ricky escape. Meanwhile, Klein and his associates arrive at the scene.

They go to an apartment where Samantha is apparently being held and Lex fights two guards, only to be accidentally tased by Samantha herself believing he was an intruder.

When Lex wakes up, Samantha reveals she faked her death to prevent Schruster from taking her out, as she got hold of files that prove Most Industries is a fraudualant scam company with malicious intent to anyone who calls it. They plan to take down Schruster by sneaking in Margo and tricking him into believing she's an escort. Meanwhile, Klein and his team also discovers Schruster's crimes, and he and his team get ready to drive to Schruster's house and arrest him.

Meanwhile, while Margo and Schruster talk, Samantha gains the rest of the files but the team is compromised, and some men come for Lex. Lex kills all of them except one, who fights him and they both fall into a pool.

Schruster holds Margo hostage while firing at both Lex and the henchman, the henchman is killed but just before Schruster could kill Lex, Klein arrives and aims his pistol at him to declare him under arrest; Schruster orders him to stand down, put the gun down and kick it to the side. Knowing that Lex is there, Klein follows through but Schruster shoots him anyway, but Lex grabs the pistol and finally kills Schruster, saving Margo in the process. Klein survives, as he wore a bulletproof vest.

Since all of Lex's killings were in self defence, Klein lets him go, he gives him the opportunity to join his team, but Lex declines. Lex pays more than $100,000 to Morgan for her help, as promised, and Samantha leaves with Ricky, whilst Margo also leaves, Lex potentially follows her.

== Cast ==
- Craig Fairbrass as Lex Walker, a military contactor and the film's protagonist.
- James Caan as Karl Schuster, a shady CEO of a fictional scam company known as Most Industries. He serves as the main antagonist.
- Shannon Elizabeth as Margo
- Jason Patric as Detective Michael Klein, A police detective who is involved with Lex.
- Tim Fields as Detective Kennedy
- Melissa Ordway as Samantha,Lex's daughter.
- Johnny Messner as Ricky
- William deVry as Nick Miller
- Brittney Alger as Girl 1
- Stephen Conroy as Gunman 1
- Zack Tiegen as Holden
- Garrett Saia as Construction Worker
- William Hayden as Main gunman
- Mark Oliver as Hassellbring
- Chelsea Bruland as Marissa
- Philippe Radelet as Bar Patron
- Mike Sealas as Bruce

== Legal action ==
In July 2014, star Craig Fairbrass and director Brian Miller sued the film's producers, including both their managers, for non-payment of deferred fees.

== Reception ==
On the review aggregator website Rotten Tomatoes, 5% of 19 critics' reviews are positive, with an average rating of 3.5/10. Metacritic, which uses a weighted average, assigned the film a score of 23 out of 100, based on 11 critics, indicating "generally unfavorable" reviews.
