= The Glee Project =

Reality television series

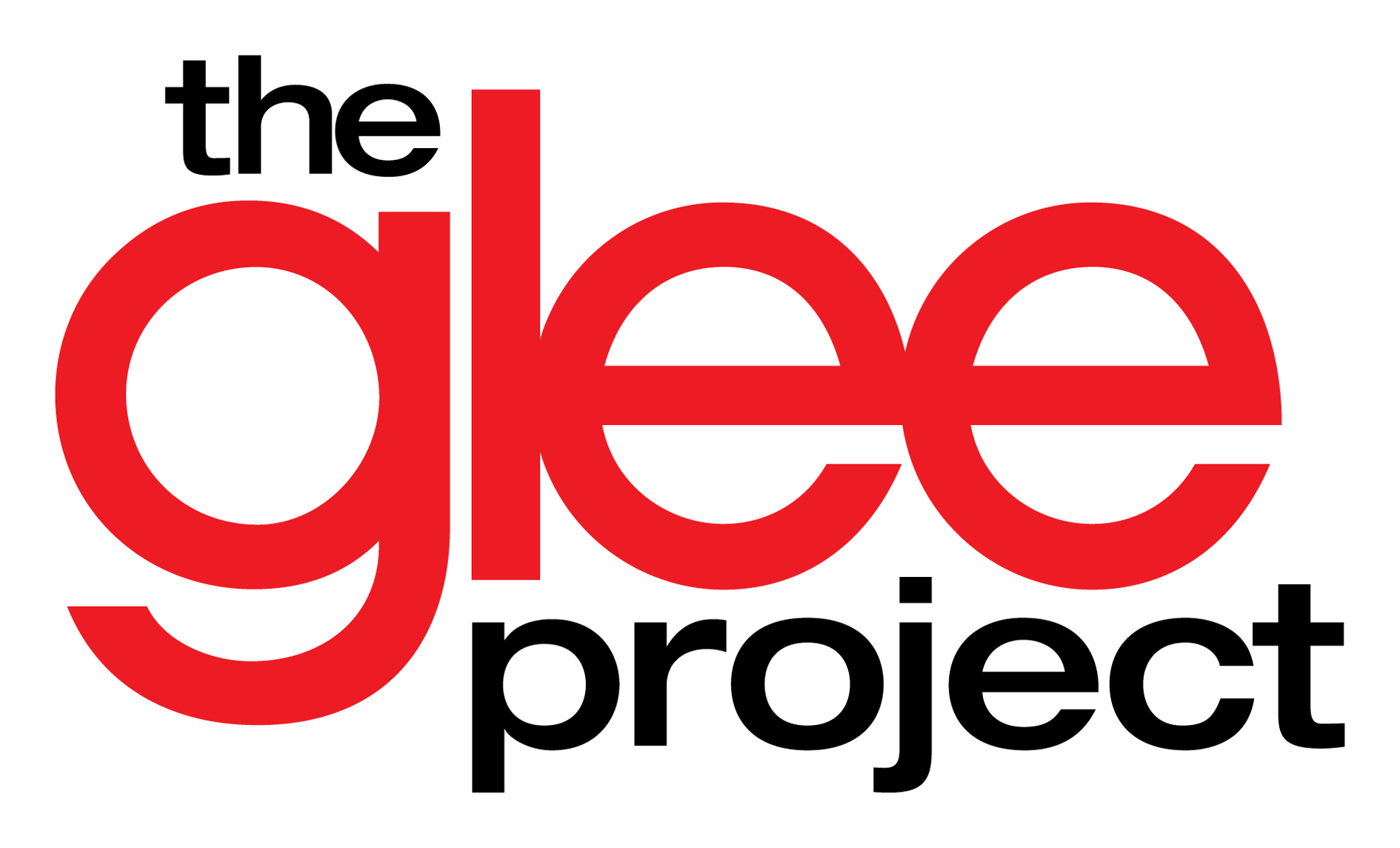
- Created by: Ryan Murphy
- Presented by: Robert Ulrich
- Judges: Ryan Murphy; Robert Ulrich; Zach Woodlee; Nikki Anders; Ian Brennan
- Narrated by: Ian Brennan
- Country of origin: United States
- Original language: English
- No. of seasons: 2
- No. of episodes: 21 (plus 2 specials)

Production
- Executive producers: Michael Davies; Shauna Minoprio; Ryan Murphy; Dante Di Loreto
- Producer: Ryan Murphy
- Running time: 44 minutes
- Production companies: Embassy Row; Ryan Murphy Productions

Original release
- Network: Oxygen
- Release: June 12, 2011 – August 14, 2012

Related
- Glee

The Glee Project is an American reality television series from Oxygen. It served as an audition for the Fox musical comedy series Glee, and the prize for the winner was a minimum seven-episode arc in the following season of the show. The show's first season premiered in the US on June 12, 2011, and concluded on August 21, 2011. In Canada, the series began airing on Slice on June 26, 2011, and in the UK, the series began airing on Sky 1 on July 14, 2011. A second season aired in the US from June 5 to August 14, 2012. In July 2013, the series was cancelled after two seasons.

Glee executive producers Ryan Murphy and Dante Di Loreto executive produced for The Glee Project. Glee's casting director, Robert J. Ulrich, was casting director for the project, while Glee's on-screen non-speaking accompanist, Brad Ellis, helping Ulrich coach 80 potential candidates as seen in the music segment of "The Top 12" special that led into the pilot episode of season 1.

== Contest process ==
Each episode of The Glee Project was given an overall theme and covered events that had taken place in about the time span of a week. The following is how the events were broadcast.

=== Homework assignment ===
Contestants were given a "homework assignment" that entailed learning and practicing segments of a chosen song. At the beginning of each episode, contestants performed their respective parts of the song in front of a mystery guest judge from the Glee cast. The contestant that completed the homework best was given a one-on-one session with the guest star and a principal part in the music video.

=== Music video (group performance) ===
Contestants then created a music video "inspired by the performances on Glee". In preparation for the music video, contestants recorded parts of a song in a professional studio with vocal producer Nikki Anders (née Hassman). They also learned choreography from Zach Woodlee and Brooke Lipton, his assistant. The entire process was overseen by Glee's casting director Robert J. Ulrich.

=== Callbacks ===
During callbacks, the top performing contestants were revealed. They were complimented on their performances and immediately called back. Then the remaining ones were critiqued by Robert J. Ulrich and Zach Woodlee, and also in the second season by Nikki Anders, about their performances. (Anders substituted for Woodlee in Ep. 8 of the first season.) Then the bottom three contestants were revealed as others were added to the callback list. They were then each assigned a different song that they will perform in hopes of being "saved".

During season 1, Nikki visited each of the bottom in their dressing/rehearsal room to provide last minute feedback and a pep talk.

=== Last chance performance ===
The bottom three of the week performed their assigned songs in front of Ryan Murphy himself. With input from Woodlee, Ulrich, and Anders (in the second season) a decision was made and one of the bottom three was eliminated.

During the next to last episode of each season Ryan didn't include the mentors; instead he invited co-creator Ian Brennan to join him. In the final episodes, Murphy, Woodlee, Ulrich, Anders, and Brennan were also joined by several of the guest mentors, writers, and cast members.

=== Final callbacks ===
Unlike most reality competition shows, contestants were not directly informed of their elimination, nor did they wait for extended tension-filled pauses to hear the results one by one. Rather, the bottom three were notified when "the list is up" and discovered their fate as they found their name on the list. Afterwards, the eliminated contestant sang lead vocals in "Keep Holding On" by Avril Lavigne with the remaining contestants singing the background vocals.

== Season one (2011) ==
Although originally planned to begin broadcasting in late May 2011, The Glee Project premiered on June 12, 2011, and aired a two-hour extended premiere where the first hour showed the audition process and selection of the twelve contenders, and the second hour was the first episode of the series. The Canadian and UK premieres were also in the same two-hour extended format: in Canada, the series began airing on Slice on June 26, 2011, and in the UK, the series began airing on Sky One on July 14, 2011.

Damian McGinty and Samuel Larsen were both proclaimed the winners of the first season, each winning a seven-episode arc. Runners-up Lindsay Pearce and Alex Newell were given prizes of a two-episode arc on Glee, and Cameron Mitchell, who quit the competition in episode 7, won the "fan favorite" competition and the associated $10,000 prize. Pearce's two-episode arc, as a Rachel Berry-esque girl named Harmony, consisted of the season premiere episode "The Purple Piano Project" and the eighth episode "Hold On to Sixteen", while McGinty began his arc as Rory Flanagan, an Irish exchange student, in the fourth episode "Pot o' Gold"; McGinty was retained on the show beyond his seven-episode prize. Larsen debuted on Glee in the thirteenth episode, "Heart", as a transfer student named Joe Hart, also appearing beyond his original seven-episode stint. Newell's first appearance was in the April 17, 2012, episode "Saturday Night Glee-ver". They played Wade Adams, a transgender member of the rival Vocal Adrenaline show choir, and appeared briefly in "Props", returning a few more times before transferring to McKinley High for the series' fourth season and becoming a series regular for its fifth season.

McGinty, Larsen, Pearce, and Newell were chosen to sing on the 2011 Glee Christmas album, Glee: The Music, The Christmas Album Volume 2.

=== Contenders ===
| Contender | Age | Hometown | Result | Date eliminated | References |
|---|---|---|---|---|---|
| Samuel Larsen | 19 | Los Angeles, California | Winner | —N/a | |
| Damian McGinty, Jr. | 18 | Derry, Northern Ireland | Winner | —N/a | |
| Lindsay Pearce | 19 | Modesto, California | Runner-up | —N/a | |
| Alex Newell | 18 | Lynn, Massachusetts | Runner-up | —N/a | |
| Hannah McIalwain | 19 | Asheville, North Carolina | 8th eliminated | August 7, 2011 | |
| Cameron Mitchell | 21 | Fort Worth, Texas | 7th eliminated | July 31, 2011 | |
| Marissa von Bleicken | 19 | New York, New York | 6th eliminated | July 24, 2011 | |
| Matheus Fernandes | 19 | Atlanta, Georgia | 5th eliminated | July 17, 2011 | |
| Miki Abraham | 19 | Paducah, Kentucky | 4th eliminated | July 10, 2011 | |
| Emily Vásquez | 22 | New York, New York | 3rd eliminated | June 26, 2011 | |
| Ellis Wylie | 18 | Grayslake, Illinois | 2nd eliminated | June 19, 2011 | |
| Bryce Ross-Johnson | 22 | Westlake Village, California | 1st eliminated | June 12, 2011 | |

=== Episodes ===
| No. overall | No. in season | Title | Original release date | Overnight viewers (millions) | Eliminated |
|---|---|---|---|---|---|
| 1 | 0 | "The Top 12" | June 12, 2011 | N/A | N/A |
A casting special showing the selection process of the new series.
| 2 | 1 | "Individuality" | June 12, 2011 | 0.455 | Bryce |
Guest judge/mentor: Darren Criss (Blaine Anderson); Homework assignment: "Signed, Sealed, Delivered I'm Yours" – Stevie Wonder; Winner: Matheus; Music video: "Firework" – Katy Perry; Last chance performance: Damian – "Jessie's Girl" – Rick Springfield; Bryce – "Just the Way You Are – Bruno Mars – Eliminated; Ellis – "Big Spender" – Sweet Charity; Note: John Ross Bowie made a cameo appearance reprising his role as Dennis, the school photographer, in the music video.
| 3 | 2 | "Theatricality" | June 19, 2011 | 0.527 | Ellis |
Guest judge/mentor: Idina Menzel (Shelby Corcoran); Homework assignment: "Bad Romance" – Lady Gaga; Winner: Alex; Music video: "We're Not Gonna Take It" – Twisted Sister; Last chance performance: Ellis – "Mack the Knife" – The Threepenny Opera – Eliminated; Matheus – "Gives You Hell" – The All-American Rejects; McKynleigh – "Piece of My Heart" – Janis Joplin
| 4 | 3 | "Vulnerability" | June 26, 2011 | 0.591 | Emily |
Guest judge/mentor: Dot-Marie Jones (Coach Beiste); Homework assignment: "Please Don't Leave Me" – Pink; Winner: Matheus; Music video: "Mad World" – Michael Andrews featuring Gary Jules; Last chance performance: Cameron – "Your Song" – Elton John; Emily – "Grenade" – Bruno Mars – Eliminated; Damian – "Are You Lonesome Tonight?" – Elvis Presley
| 5 | 4 | "Dance Ability" | July 10, 2011 | 0.745 | McKynleigh |
Guest judge/mentor: Harry Shum, Jr. (Mike Chang); Homework assignment: "Hey, Soul Sister" – Train; Winner: Samuel; Music video: "U Can't Touch This" – MC Hammer; Last chance performance: McKynleigh – "Last Name" – Carrie Underwood – Eliminated; Matheus – "Down" – Jay Sean; Alex – "I Will Always Love You" – Whitney Houston
| 6 | 5 | "Pairability" | July 17, 2011 | 0.810 | Matheus |
Guest judge/mentor: Darren Criss (Blaine Anderson); Homework assignment: "Need You Now" – Lady Antebellum; Winner: Marissa; Music video: Damian & Matheus – "The Lady Is a Tramp" – Sammy Davis, Jr.; Hannah & Alex – "Nowadays" – Chicago; Marissa & Samuel – "Don't You Want Me" – The Human League; Cameron & Lindsay – "Baby, It's Cold Outside" – Frank Loesser; Last chance performance: Hannah & Alex – "Valerie" – The Zutons (Mark Ronson and Amy Winehouse cover version); Damian & Matheus – "These Boots Are Made for Walkin'" – Nancy Sinatra; Cameron & Lindsay – "River Deep – Mountain High" – Ike & Tina Turner; Bottom three: Alex; Cameron; Matheus – Eliminated
| 7 | 6 | "Tenacity" | July 24, 2011 | 1.270 | Marissa |
Guest Judge/mentor: Max Adler (Dave Karofsky); Homework assignment: "Bulletproof" – La Roux; Winner: Marissa; Music video: "Ice Ice Baby" – Vanilla Ice / "Under Pressure" – Queen featuring David Bowie; Last chance performance: Alex – "And I Am Telling You I'm Not Going" – Dreamgirls; Marissa – "Hate On Me" – Jill Scott – Eliminated; Cameron – "Love Can Wait" – Cameron Mitchell; Note: Guest mentor Max Adler also made a cameo appearance reprising his role as Dave Karofsky in the music video.
| 8 | 7 | "Sexuality" | July 31, 2011 | 0.790 | Cameron |
Guest Judge/mentor: Mark Salling (Noah "Puck" Puckerman) and Ashley Fink (Lauren Zizes); Homework assignment: "Like a Virgin" – Madonna; Winner: Samuel; Music video: "Teenage Dream" – Katy Perry; Last chance performance: Alex – "I Will Survive" – Gloria Gaynor; Cameron – "Blackbird" – The Beatles – Withdrew; Damian – "Danny Boy" – Frederic Weatherly; Note: Ryan Murphy revealed to Cameron that by withdrawing from the competition, he had saved Damian from elimination.
| 9 | 8 | "Believability" | August 7, 2011 | 0.912 | Hannah |
Guest Judge/mentor: Jenna Ushkowitz (Tina Cohen-Chang); Homework assignment: "True Colors" – Cyndi Lauper; Winner: Hannah; Music video: "The Only Exception" – Paramore; Last chance performance: Hannah – "Back to December" – Taylor Swift – Eliminated; Lindsay – "Maybe This Time" – Cabaret; Samuel – "Animal" – Neon Trees
| 10 | 9 | "Generosity" | August 14, 2011 | 0.920 | N/A |
Guest Judge/mentor: Kevin McHale (Artie Abrams); Homework assignment: "Lean On Me" – Bill Withers; Winner: Lindsay; Music video: "Sing" – My Chemical Romance; Last chance performance: Alex – "His Eye Is on the Sparrow" – Civilla D. Martin; Lindsay – "Defying Gravity" – Wicked; Damian – "I've Gotta Be Me" – Sammy Davis, Jr.; Samuel – "My Funny Valentine" – Babes in Arms; No elimination this week
| 11 | 10 | "Glee-ality" | August 21, 2011 | 1.240 | N/A |
Guest Judge/mentor: Ryan Murphy; Homework assignment: "Don't Stop Believin'" – Journey; Music video: "Raise Your Glass" – Pink; Last chance performance: Lindsay – "Gimme Gimme" – Thoroughly Modern Millie; Damian – "Beyond the Sea" – Charles Trenet; Samuel – "Jolene" – Dolly Parton; Alex – "I Am Changing" – Dreamgirls; Note: All previously eliminated contestants made cameo appearances in the music video. The eliminated contestants also sang backup for the homework assignment. Runners-up and earning 2 episode arcs on Glee: Alex Newell & Lindsay Pearce; Winners of the series and earning 7 episode arcs on Glee: Samuel Larsen & Damian McGinty

=== Contender progress ===
| Contestant | Episode | | | | | | | | | |
| Contestant | 1 | 2 | 3 | 4 | 5 | 6 | 7 | 8 | 9 | 10 |
|---|---|---|---|---|---|---|---|---|---|---|
| Samuel | HIGH | HIGH | HIGH | W/H | HIGH | HIGH | WIN | RISK | RISK | Winner |
| Damian | RISK | SAFE | RISK | HIGH | RISK | HIGH | SAVED | LOW | RISK | Winner |
| Lindsay | HIGH | HIGH | LOW | HIGH | RISK | HIGH | LOW | RISK | W/R | Runner-Up |
| Alex | HIGH | W/H | HIGH | RISK | RISK | RISK | RISK | HIGH | RISK | Runner-Up |
| Hannah | SAFE | SAFE | HIGH | SAFE | RISK | LOW | HIGH | W/E | | |
| Cameron | HIGH | HIGH | RISK | LOW | RISK | RISK | QUIT | | | |
| Marissa | SAFE | HIGH | HIGH | HIGH | W/H | W/E | | | | |
| Matheus | W/H | RISK | W/H | RISK | ELIM | | | | | |
| McKynleigh | SAFE | RISK | HIGH | ELIM | | | | | | |
| Emily | HIGH | SAFE | ELIM | | | | | | | |
| Ellis | RISK | ELIM | | | | | | | | |
| Bryce | ELIM | | | | | | | | | |

Key

SAFE The contender was not at risk of elimination.
WIN The contender won the homework assignment and was not at risk of elimination.
W/R The contender won the homework assignment but was at risk of being eliminated.
RISK The contender sang for Ryan and was immediately safe.
RISK The contender was at risk of being eliminated.
ELIM The contender was eliminated.
W/E The contender won the homework assignment but was eliminated.
QUIT The contender quit the competition.
SAVED The contender was to be eliminated, but was saved due to another contender quitting.
WINNER The contender won a 7-episode arc on Glee.
HIGH The contender was called back without any notes.
W/H The contender won the homework assignment and was high on the main challenge.
W/L The contender won the homework assignment and was low on the main challenge.
LOW The contender was in risk of going to the bottom three but was ultimately safe. Used from the third episode forward when 4 people are being judged.
RUNNER-UP The contender won a 2-episode arc on Glee.

== Season two (2012) ==
Casting for a second season was announced after the first season finale. The season pickup was confirmed on January 17, 2012, at which time it was stated that the second season would feature fourteen contestants, an increase of two from the twelve in the first season. On January 21, 2012, Lea Michele revealed that she would be the guest mentor for the season premiere. Other guest mentors would include season 1 co-winner Samuel Larsen (Joe Hart), Cory Monteith (Finn Hudson), Naya Rivera (Santana Lopez), Jane Lynch (Sue Sylvester), Amber Riley (Mercedes Jones), Chris Colfer (Kurt Hummel), Dianna Agron (Quinn Fabray) and returning season 1 mentors Darren Criss (Blaine Anderson) and Kevin McHale (Artie Abrams).

The second season premiered in the US on June 5, 2012, and ran for eleven weeks, concluding on August 14, 2012. There was one winner for the season: Blake Jenner won the seven-episode arc on Glee. He made his first appearance in the fifth episode of season four, "The Role You Were Born to Play", as a McKinley student named Ryder Lynn. He was a recurring character for 18 episodes on season 4 and was promoted to series regular on season 5. Ali Stroker, the runner up, made an appearance in the fourth season episode, "I Do", as Betty Pillsbury.

Dani Shay, who was the third person eliminated, was previously a contestant on America's Got Talent (season 6) going as far as the quarter-finals.

=== Contenders ===
| Contender | Age | Hometown | Result | Date eliminated | References |
|---|---|---|---|---|---|
| Blake Jenner | 19 | Miami, Florida | Winner | —N/a | |
| Ali Stroker | 24 | New York, New York | Runner-up | —N/a | |
| Aylin Bayramoglu | 19 | Chicago, Illinois | Runner-up | —N/a | |
| Lily Mae Harrington | 19 | Dennis, Massachusetts | 11th eliminated | August 7, 2012 | |
| Michael Weisman | 18 | Chicago, Illinois | 10th eliminated | August 7, 2012 | |
| Shanna Henderson | 21 | Auburn, Alabama | 9th eliminated | July 31, 2012 | |
| Abraham Lim | 24 | San Diego, California | 8th eliminated | July 24, 2012 | |
| Nellie Veitenheimer | 19 | Tacoma, Washington | 7th eliminated | July 17, 2012 | |
| Charlie Lubeck | 22 | Chicago, Illinois | 6th eliminated | July 10, 2012 | |
| Mario Bonds | 24 | Lanham, Maryland | 5th eliminated | July 3, 2012 | |
| Tyler Ford | 21 | Boca Raton, Florida | 4th eliminated | June 26, 2012 | |
| Dani Shay | 23 | Orlando, Florida | 3rd eliminated | June 12, 2012 | |
| Taryn Douglas | 22 | Detroit, Michigan | 2nd eliminated | June 12, 2012 | |
| Maxfield Camp | 22 | Nashville, Tennessee | 1st eliminated | June 5, 2012 | |

=== Episodes ===
| No. overall | No. in season | Title | Original release date | Overnight viewers (millions) | Eliminated |
|---|---|---|---|---|---|
| 12 | 0 | "The Glee Project Season 2: The Final 14" | June 2, 2012 | N/A | N/A |
A casting special showing the selection process of the second season.: Guest judges/mentors: Samuel Larsen (Joe Hart), Damian McGinty (Rory Flanagan), Alex Newell (Wade "Unique" Adams); Music video: "The Edge of Glory" – Lady Gaga; Note: Judges Robert Ulrich and Zach Woodlee made cameo appearances as themselves in the music video.
| 13 | 1 | "Individuality" | June 5, 2012 | 0.389 | Maxfield |
Guest judge/mentor: Lea Michele (Rachel Berry); Homework Assignment: "Born This Way" – Lady Gaga; Winner: Shanna; Music video: "Here I Go Again" – Whitesnake; Last chance performance: Aylin – "Without You" – David Guetta feat. Usher; Tyler – "ABC" – The Jackson 5; Maxfield – "Always on My Mind" – Willie Nelson – Eliminated; Note: Iqbal Theba made a cameo appearance reprising his role as Principal Figgins in the music video.
| 14 | 2 | "Dance-ability" | June 12, 2012 | 0.474 | Taryn and Dani |
Guest judge/mentor: Samuel Larsen (Joe Hart); Homework Assignment: "We Got the Beat" – The Go-Go's; Winner: Abraham; Music video: "Party Rock Anthem" – LMFAO; Last chance performance: Dani – "Landslide" – Fleetwood Mac – Eliminated; Tyler – "Daniel" – Elton John; Lily Mae – "Man! I Feel Like a Woman!" – Shania Twain; Note: Taryn withdrew from the competition prior to the homework assignment.
| 15 | 3 | "Vulnerability" | June 19, 2012 | 0.487 | N/A |
Guest judge/mentor: Cory Monteith (Finn Hudson); Homework Assignment: "My Life Would Suck Without You" – Kelly Clarkson; Winner: Nellie; Music video: "Everybody Hurts" – R.E.M.; Last chance performance: Lily Mae – "Mercy" – Duffy; Charlie – "Fix You" – Coldplay; Mario – "Over the Rainbow"; No elimination this week
| 16 | 4 | "Sexuality" | June 26, 2012 | 0.640 | Tyler |
Guest judge/mentor: Naya Rivera (Santana Lopez); Homework Assignment: "I Wanna Sex You Up" – Color Me Badd; Winner: Charlie; Music video: "Moves Like Jagger" – Maroon 5 featuring Christina Aguilera/"Milkshake" – Kelis; Last chance performance: Charlie – "I Get a Kick Out of You" – Cole Porter; Tyler – "Smile" – Charlie Chaplin – Eliminated; Michael – "Lucky" – Jason Mraz feat. Colbie Caillat; Note: Mary Gillis made a cameo appearance reprising her role as Mrs. Hagberg in the music video.
| 17 | 5 | "Adaptability" | July 3, 2012 | 0.495 | Mario |
Guest judge/mentor: Kevin McHale (Artie Abrams); Homework Assignment: "You Oughta Know" – Alanis Morissette; Winner: Aylin; Music video: "Price Tag" – Jessie J; Last chance performance: Nellie & Blake – "Waiting for a Girl Like You" – Foreigner; Ali & Abraham – "Last Friday Night" – Katy Perry; Mario & Charlie – "Don't Let the Sun Go Down on Me" – Elton John; Bottom three: Abraham; Charlie; Mario – Eliminated
| 18 | 6 | "Fearlessness" | July 10, 2012 | 0.507 | Charlie |
Guest judge/mentor: Jane Lynch (Sue Sylvester); Homework Assignment: "Now That We Found Love" – Heavy D & The Boyz; Winner: Lily Mae; Music video: "Hit Me With Your Best Shot" – Pat Benatar / "One Way or Another" – Blondie; Last chance performance: Aylin – "Take a Bow" – Rihanna; Charlie – "It's Not Unusual" – Tom Jones – Eliminated; Nellie – "If I Were a Boy" – Beyoncé; Note: Rock Anthony made a cameo appearance reprising his role as Rick "The Stick" Nelson in the music video.
| 19 | 7 | "Theatricality" | July 17, 2012 | 0.342 | Nellie |
Guest judge/mentor: Grant Gustin (Sebastian Smythe); Homework Assignment: "I Hope I Get It" – A Chorus Line; Winner: Ali; Music video: "When I Grow Up" – Pussycat Dolls; Last chance performance: Nellie – "I'm the Only One" – Melissa Etheridge – Eliminated; Abraham – "Stereo Hearts" – Gym Class Heroes feat. Adam Levine; Lily Mae – "Someone Like You" – Adele; Note: For the music video, each contestant was assigned the role of a musical icon: Abraham played David Bowie, Ali was Katy Perry, Aylin was Madonna, Blake was Boy George, Lily was Cyndi Lauper, Michael was Elvis, Nellie was Britney Spears and Shanna was Lady Gaga.
| 20 | 8 | "Tenacity" | July 24, 2012 | 0.357 | Abraham |
Guest judge/mentor: Amber Riley (Mercedes Jones); Homework Assignment: "Survivor" – Destiny's Child; Winner: Ali; Music video: "Eye of the Tiger" – Survivor; Last chance performance: Michael – "Brick" – Ben Folds Five; Abraham – "Man in the Mirror" – Michael Jackson – Eliminated; Lily Mae – "I'm the Greatest Star" – Funny Girl
| 21 | 9 | "Romanticality" | July 31, 2012 | 0.339 | Shanna |
Guest judge/mentor: Darren Criss (Blaine Anderson); Homework Assignment: "More Than Words" – Extreme; Winner: Blake; Music video: "We Found Love" – Rihanna; Last chance performance: Aylin – "The First Time Ever I Saw Your Face" – Roberta Flack; Blake – "Losing My Religion" – R.E.M.; Shanna – "Stronger" – Kelly Clarkson – Eliminated; Note: Nuno Bettencourt from Extreme accompanied the contenders on guitar during the homework assignment. Iqbal Theba made a cameo appearance reprising his role as Principal Figgins in the music video.
| 22 | 10 | "Actability" | August 7, 2012 | 0.447 | Michael and Lily Mae |
Guest judge/mentor: Dianna Agron (Quinn Fabray); Homework Assignment: "Addicted to Love" – Robert Palmer; Winner: Michael; Music video: "Perfect" – Pink; Last chance performance: Michael – "Girls Just Want to Have Fun" – Cyndi Lauper – Eliminated; Lily Mae – "Son of a Preacher Man" – Dusty Springfield – Eliminated; Ali – "Here's to Us" – Halestorm; Blake – "I'm Still Standing" – Elton John; Aylin – "Fighter" – Christina Aguilera
| 23 | 11 | "Glee-ality" | August 14, 2012 | 0.821 | N/A |
Guest judge/mentor: Chris Colfer (Kurt Hummel); Homework Assignment: "You Can't Stop the Beat" – Hairspray; Winner: Ali, Aylin and Blake; Music video: "Tonight Tonight" – Hot Chelle Rae; Last chance performance: Ali – "Popular" – Wicked; Blake – "I'll Be" – Edwin McCain; Aylin – "Rolling in the Deep" – Adele; Note: Damian McGinty made a cameo appearance reprising his role as Rory Flanagan in the music video, as did all the previously eliminated contestants from the second season. The eliminated contestants also sang backup for the homework assignment. Winner of the series and earning a 7-episode arc on Glee: Blake Jenner

=== Contender progress ===
| Contestant | Episode | | | | | | | | | | |
| Contestant | 1 | 2 | 3 | 4 | 5 | 6 | 7 | 8 | 9 | 10 | 11 |
|---|---|---|---|---|---|---|---|---|---|---|---|
| Blake | HIGH | HIGH | FIRST | HIGH | RISK | SAFE | HIGH | HIGH | W/R | RISK | WINNER |
| Ali | HIGH | SAFE | LOW | HIGH | RISK | HIGH | W/F | W/H | HIGH | RISK | RUNNER-UP |
| Aylin | RISK | HIGH | HIGH | HIGH | W/H | RISK | HIGH | LOW | RISK | RISK | RUNNER-UP |
| Lily Mae | SAFE | RISK | RISK | HIGH | HIGH | W/H | RISK | RISK | HIGH | OUT | |
| Michael | HIGH | HIGH | HIGH | RISK | HIGH | LOW | LOW | RISK | LOW | W/O | |
| Shanna | W/F | HIGH | HIGH | LOW | HIGH | SAFE | HIGH | HIGH | OUT | | |
| Abraham | HIGH | W/L | HIGH | HIGH | RISK | SAFE | RISK | OUT | | | |
| Nellie | HIGH | LOW | W/L | FIRST | RISK | RISK | OUT | | | | |
| Charlie | HIGH | SAFE | RISK | W/R | RISK | OUT | | | | | |
| Mario | SAFE | SAFE | RISK | HIGH | OUT | | | | | | |
| Tyler | RISK | RISK | HIGH | OUT | | | | | | | |
| Dani | HIGH | OUT | | | | | | | | | |
| Taryn | LOW | QUIT | | | | | | | | | |
| Maxfield | OUT | | | | | | | | | | |

Key

SAFE The contender was not at risk of elimination.
WIN The contender won the homework assignment and was not at risk of elimination.
FIRST The contender was called first on the callback list.
W/H The contender won the homework assignment and was HIGH on the main challenge.
W/F The contender won the homework assignment and was first called back on the list.
HIGH The contender was called back without any notes.
W/L The contender won the homework assignment and was LOW on the main challenge.
W/R The contender won the homework assignment but was at risk of being eliminated.
LOW The contender was in risk of going to the bottom three but was ultimately safe.
RISK The contender sang for Ryan and was immediately safe.
RISK The contender was at risk of being eliminated.
OUT The contender was eliminated.
W/O The contender won the homework assignment but was eliminated.
QUIT The contender quit the competition.
WINNER The contender won a 7-episode arc on Glee.
RUNNER-UP The contender was crowned a runner-up.

== International syndication ==
| Country / Region | Channel | First aired | References |
|---|---|---|---|
| Australia | Eleven | July 15, 2011 | |
| Brazil | Fox Brasil | June 26, 2011 | |
| Canada | Slice; Global | June 26, 2011 | |
| France | W9 | February 29, 2012 (canceled after episode 2) | |
| Japan | Skachan; Fox Japan | June 29, 2011; September 25, 2011 | |
| New Zealand | FOUR | August 8, 2011 | |
| Philippines | ETC, Jack TV | June 13, 2011 | |
| Philippines | STAR World | October 17, 2011 | |
| Portugal | Fox Life | November 25, 2011 | |
| Southeast Asia; Hong Kong; Republic of China | STAR World | August 15, 2011 | |
| Turkey | Fox Life | December 12, 2011 | |
| United Kingdom | Sky 1 PickTV | July 13, 2011 | |
| United States (original run) | Oxygen | June 12, 2011 | —N/a |
