= Patrick Savage (composer) =

Australian composer and violinist

- Born: Padraic Savage
- Origin: Bendigo, Australia
- Genres: Film scores
- Occupations: Composer, musician
- Instrument: Violin
- Website: patricksavage.com

Patrick Savage is an Australian-born composer and violinist best known for his collaboration with French composer, Holeg Spies, on the score for The Human Centipede (First Sequence).

He was formerly leader of the Tippett Quartet in London and formerly Principal First Violin with the Royal Philharmonic Orchestra and is currently first violin at the London, West End production of Hamilton (musical).

A former student at the Victorian College of the Arts in Melbourne and the Royal College of Music in London, he collaborates regularly as a composer on scores with French composer and producer, Holeg Spies, and has contributed as a musician to a large number of high-profile film scores

In collaboration with pianist, Martin Cousin, his 2024 album release, on the Quartz Music label, The Golden Age of Hollywood: Concert Works for Violin and Piano, included world premiere recordings of music by Bernard Herrmann, Jerome Moross and Heinz Roemheld, and was received with critical acclaim.

== Filmography ==
- Black Site
- Trial 22
- Hairy
- Heckle
- Soundtrack to Sixteen
- Hex
- Le Chemin Des Juifs
- Selling Isobel
- Purple Heather
- The Raven Club
- The Outsider (James Caan, Shannon Elizabeth, Craig Fairbrass, Jason Patric, dir Brian A Miller)
- Invizimals: The Lost Kingdom
- Tarot (in development)
- Becoming (associate producer)
- Abruptio (dir Evan Marlowe)
- Stolen Light
- Asylum 108
- Se vende perro que habla, 10 euros
- Dead End
- LA I Hate You (additional music)
- American Maniacs
- Holy Monks (animated television series)
- Jack of Diamonds (television film)
- The Human Centipede (First Sequence)
- Shadowland
- The Ugly File
- I Do
- Peekers
- Dead@17
- 4 Conversations About Love
- Ron's Gone Wrong
