= Adopt a Highway (film) =

2019 American drama film

- Film poster
- Directed by: Logan Marshall-Green
- Written by: Logan Marshall-Green
- Produced by: Jason Blum; Ethan Hawke; Ryan Hawke; Adam Hendricks; John H. Lang; Greg Gilreath
- Starring: Ethan Hawke; Elaine Hendrix; Diane Gaeta; Mo McRae; Chris Sullivan; Betty Gabriel; Loni Love
- Cinematography: Pepe Avila del Pino
- Edited by: Claudia Castello
- Music by: Jason Isbell
- Production companies: Blumhouse Productions; Divide/Conquer; Under the Influence Productions
- Distributed by: RLJE Films
- Release dates: March 10, 2019 (SXSW); November 1, 2019 (United States)
- Running time: 81 minutes
- Country: United States
- Language: English

Adopt a Highway is a 2019 American drama film written and directed by Logan Marshall-Green in his directorial debut. It stars Ethan Hawke, Elaine Hendrix, Diane Gaeta, Betty Gabriel, Mo McRae, Chris Sullivan, Nate Mooney, Christopher Heyerdahl, Loni Love and Anne-Marie Johnson. Jason Blum produced the film through his Blumhouse Productions banner, and Adam Hendricks and Greg Gilreath produced the film through their Divide/Conquer banner.

It had its world premiere at South by Southwest, in Austin, Texas, United States, on March 10, 2019. The film was released on November 1, 2019, by RLJE Films.

== Plot ==
Having spent the last 21 years in a Californian prison for possession of marijuana, a middle-aged man named Russell Earl Millings must find his way in a world that has changed completely since he was incarcerated in the 1990s.

Upon his release, Russell finds employment in a burger restaurant. He visits an internet café and searches for his father, who died in 2001. One night whilst locking up the restaurant, he finds an abandoned baby in the dumpster; a note kept in the bag with the baby reveals the baby's name is Ella. Russell attempts to care for Ella himself and bonds with her, telling her of his father's hobby of stamp collecting.

The baby falls from the bed and is injured, and Russell takes her to a clinic, where Ella is taken away and he is interviewed by the police. After losing Ella, Russell travels to Casper, Wyoming, by bus, meeting a woman on the bus who invites him to join her if he ever visits Denver. In Casper, he visits his father's grave.

He visits a bank to open his father's safe deposit box, for which he has been left the key. In the box are a letter professing his father's love and valuable stamps, including a Tyrian plum. He opens a storage unit also left to him by his late father, which contains the rest of his father's stamp collection and clothes.

Russell visits Family & Child Services in Los Angeles to check up on Ella and give them an envelope containing details of a trust he has set up in her name, to be given to her on her 18th birthday. Russell leaves LA buying a ticket for a bus trip. When asked where he would like to go, he smiles at the possibilities ahead.

== Cast ==
- Ethan Hawke as Russell Millings
- Elaine Hendrix as Diane Spring
- Diane Gaeta as Becca
- Betty Gabriel as Deeks
- Mo McRae as Wilson
- Chris Sullivan as Orankle
- Nate Mooney as Homeless Man
- Christopher Heyerdahl as Jim
- Anne-Marie Johnson as Tracy Westmore
- Milauna Jackson as Detective Minardi
- Loni Love as Cher

== Release ==
The film had its premiere at SXSW on March 10, 2019. Shortly after, RLJE Films acquired distribution rights to the film, and released it on November 1, 2019.

== Critical reception ==
As of October 2021, 69% of the 32 reviews compiled by Rotten Tomatoes are positive, with an average of 6.5/10. The site's critical consensus states, "Adopt a Highway might have done more to fill in its sparsely sketched story, but Ethan Hawke's performance is often enough to fill in the blanks." On Metacritic, the film holds a rating of 53 out of 100, based on 11 critics, indicating "mixed or average" reviews.
