= Logan Marshall-Green =

American actor (born 1976)

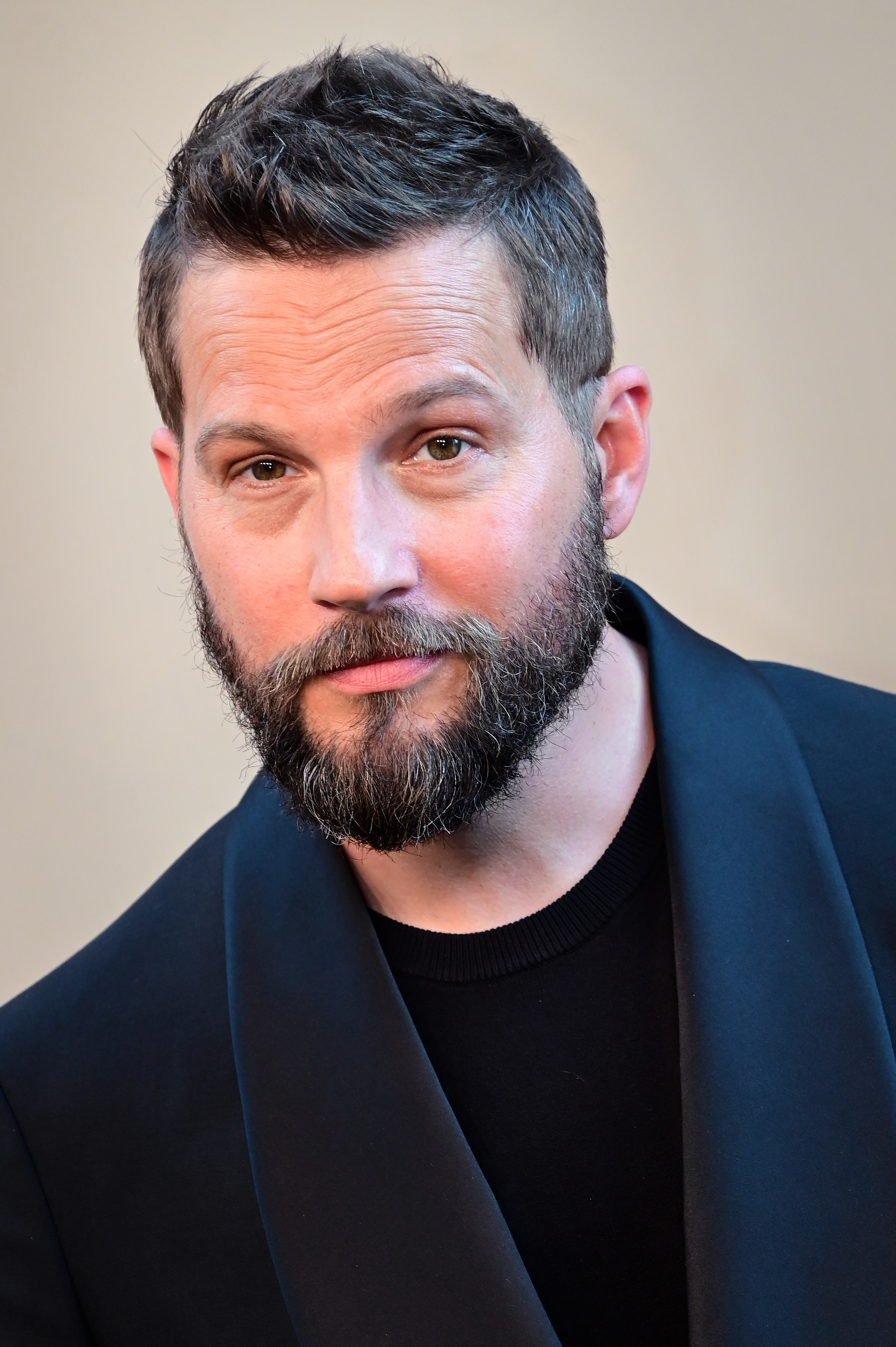
- Marshall-Green in 2026
- Born: November 1, 1976 (age 50); Charleston, South Carolina, U.S.
- Education: University of Tennessee, Knoxville (BA); New York University (MFA)
- Occupations: Actor, filmmaker
- Years active: 2003–present
- Spouse: Diane Gaeta (m. 2012; div. 2020)
- Partner(s): Marisa Tomei (2008–2012)
- Children: 2

Logan Marshall-Green (born November 1, 1976) is an American actor and filmmaker. His lead roles in The Invitation (2015) and Upgrade (2018) earned him nominations for Best Actor at the Fangoria Chainsaw Awards. He won the Golden Joystick Award for Best Performer for his leading role in the 2019 video game Telling Lies.

He also acted in the films Devil (2010), Prometheus (2012), Spider-Man: Homecoming (2017), and The Odyssey (2026). He made his directorial debut with Adopt a Highway (2019). On television, he has had supporting roles in 24, The O.C. (both 2005), Traveler (2007), Dark Blue (2009–2010), Quarry (2016), and stars as Pete Calvin in Marshals (2026–present).

== Early life ==
Marshall-Green was born in Charleston, South Carolina, to teacher parents. He was raised by his mother, Lowry Marshall, in Cranston, Rhode Island, while she taught theatre at Brown University. He has a twin brother named Taylor. They both attended Barrington High School in the early 1990s. He did his undergraduate studies at the University of Tennessee, Knoxville, where he also wrote for the school newspaper, The Daily Beacon, as an entertainment writer covering the bar, music, and theater scene.

Becoming more interested in theatre, he attended the National Theater Institute in Waterford, Connecticut. He earned a Master's in Fine Arts from New York University's Graduate Acting Program at the Tisch School of the Arts.

== Career ==
Marshall-Green appeared in both Law & Order: Special Victims Unit in 2003 and Law & Order in 2004, before landing recurring roles on Fox's The O.C. and 24. He received a Drama Desk Award for his performance in Neil LaBute's play The Distance from Here in 2004.

In 2005, he performed in three separate productions: in June he played an anthropomorphic shark in Adam Bock's Swimming in the Shallows; in August he appeared as Bo Decker in a production of William Inge's classic Bus Stop; and in December he was Beethoven in the Peanuts spoof Dog Sees God: Confessions of a Teenage Blockhead (for which he received a Lucille Lortel Award for Outstanding Featured Actor nomination).

He played the villainous Edmund in the Public Theater production of King Lear starring Kevin Kline in the title role and directed by James Lapine. For his performance in King Lear and Pig Farm, he was nominated for a Drama League Award for Distinguished Performance.

In 2005, Marshall-Green appeared in the film Alchemy. That same year he also appeared in the Miramax film The Great Raid. Marshall-Green portrayed Tyler Fog in the 2007 ABC series Traveler. He appeared as Paco in the 2007 film Across the Universe. He featured as Dean Bendis, an undercover police officer, in a black ops group of the LAPD headed by Dylan McDermott in the TNT series Dark Blue. He played a young rookie cop the 2010 criminal drama Brooklyn's Finest directed by Antoine Fuqua and had a lead role in the horror film Devil.

He appeared in the 2012 Ridley Scott film Prometheus as Holloway, a crew member aboard Prometheus. He also portrayed Will in Karyn Kusama's 2015 horror-thriller The Invitation.

In 2018, Marshall-Green starred as the lead in Leigh Whannell and Blumhouse's science fiction cyberpunk film Upgrade.

Marshall-Green made his directorial debut with the drama film Adopt a Highway, which was released in March 2019. The film starred Ethan Hawke and Betty Gabriel, and was produced by Jason Blum through Blumhouse Productions. The actor appeared in an episode of When They See Us, and starred in the video game Telling Lies, which was released in August 2019.

== Personal life ==
Between 2008 and 2012, Marshall-Green was in a relationship with actress Marisa Tomei. He married actress Diane Gaeta in 2012. The couple have a son (born 2014). Marshall-Green is also a stepfather to his ex-wife's daughter (born 2010), whose father was actor Johnny Lewis. Gaeta filed for divorce from Marshall-Green on April 5, 2019. The divorce was finalized on July 23, 2020.

== Filmography ==
=== Film ===
| Year | Title | Role | Notes |
|---|---|---|---|
| 2004 | The Kindness of Strangers | Ray | Short film |
| 2005 | Alchemy | Martin | |
| 2005 | The Great Raid | Lt. Paul Colvin | |
| 2007 | Across the Universe | Paco | |
| 2009 | Brooklyn's Finest | Melvin Panton | |
| 2010 | Devil | Anthony "Tony" Janekowski, Mechanic, Former Marine | |
| 2012 | Prometheus | Charlie Holloway | |
| 2013 | As I Lay Dying | Jewel | |
| 2013 | Cold Comes the Night | Billy | |
| 2014 | Madame Bovary | The Marquis | |
| 2014 | The Sound and the Fury | Dalton Ames | |
| 2015 | The Invitation | Will | Nominated – Fangoria Chainsaw Award for Best Actor |
| 2016 | Snowden | Male Drone Pilot | |
| 2016 | Black Dog, Red Dog | Stephen | |
| 2017 | Sand Castle | Sergeant Harper | |
| 2017 | Spider-Man: Homecoming | Jackson Brice / Shocker #1 | |
| 2018 | Upgrade | Grey Trace | Nominated – Fangoria Chainsaw Award for Best Actor |
| 2019 | Adopt a Highway | —N/a | Director and writer only |
| 2021 | How It Ends | Nate | |
| 2021 | Intrusion | Henry | |
| 2022 | Redeeming Love | Paul | |
| 2022 | The Listener | Michael (voice) | |
| 2022 | Lou | Philip | |
| 2023 | Reverse the Curse | Ted | |
| 2024 | Carry-On | Agent Alcott | |
| 2026 | Killing Castro | Johnny Roselli | |
| 2026 | The Odyssey | Melanthius | |
| 2026 | Beware Boiúna | Brennan Malloy | |

=== Television ===
| Year | Title | Role | Notes |
|---|---|---|---|
| 2003 | Law & Order: Special Victims Unit | Mitch Wilkens, aka Max Van Horn | Episode: "Soulless" |
| 2004 | Law & Order | Kyle Mellors | Episode: "Evil Breeds" |
| 2005 | 24 | Richard Heller | 6 episodes |
| 2005 | The O.C. | Trey Atwood | 9 episodes |
| 2007 | Traveler | Tyler Fog | Main cast; 8 episodes |
| 2009–10 | Dark Blue | Dean Bendis | Main cast; 20 episodes |
| 2016 | Quarry | Mac Conway | Main cast; 8 episodes |
| 2017–18 | Damnation | Creeley Turner | Main role; 10 episodes |
| 2019 | When They See Us | Roberts | Miniseries; Episode: "Part Four" |
| 2020 | The Defeated | Moritz McLaughlin | Main cast; 8 episodes |
| 2021–22 | Big Sky | Travis Stone | Main cast (season 2) |
| 2025 | And Just Like That... | Adam | Main cast (season 3) |
| 2026 | Marshals | Pete Calvin | Main role |

=== Other media ===
| Year | Title | Role | Notes |
|---|---|---|---|
| 2019 | Telling Lies | David Smith | Video game Won – Golden Joystick Award for Best Performer; Nominated – New York Game Award for Best Acting in a Game; Nominated – NAVGTR Award for Performance in a Drama, Lead; Nominated – British Academy Games Award for Performer in a Leading Role |
| 2022 | R.A. the Rugged Man: Dragon Fire | Dragon Fire (Music video) | Music video |
