= Clickbait (miniseries) =

American-Australian television series

- Genre: Drama; Thriller
- Created by: Tony Ayres & Christian White
- Starring: Zoe Kazan; Betty Gabriel; Phoenix Raei; Abraham Lim; Adrian Grenier; Motell G Foster; Jessie Collins
- Composer: Cornel Wilczek
- Countries of origin: United States; Australia
- Original language: English
- No. of episodes: 8

Production
- Executive producers: Tony Ayres; David Heyman; Tom Winchester; Michael McMahon; Bradford Winters; Brad Anderson
- Producers: Tom Hoffie; Joanna Werner
- Cinematography: Marden Dean; Mark Wareham
- Editors: Rodrigo Balart; Mark Atkin
- Running time: 42–52 minutes
- Production companies: Matchbox Pictures; Tony Ayres Productions; Heyday Television; NBCUniversal International Studios

Original release
- Network: Netflix
- Release: August 25, 2021

Clickbait is a drama television miniseries, created by Tony Ayres and Christian White. Ayres serves as showrunner, while Brad Anderson, Emma Freeman, Ben Young, and Cherie Nowlan are directors. Stars Zoe Kazan as a woman who is trying to find and uncover the truth about her older brother's disappearance, Betty Gabriel as her brother’s wife, and Phoenix Raei as a Police Department detective. Also stars Abraham Lim, Adrian Grenier, Motell G Foster and Jessie Collins. It was released on Netflix on August 25, 2021.

== Overview ==
Clickbait explores the dark side of social media. In one thread of the story, a father goes missing, only to appear in a viral video holding a sign saying that he will die if the video receives five million views.

The series is set in Oakland, California, but was mostly filmed in Melbourne, Australia.

== Cast ==
=== Main ===
- Zoe Kazan as Pia Brewer, Nick's younger sister
- Betty Gabriel as Sophie Brewer, Nick's wife
- Phoenix Raei as Roshan Amiri, an Oakland Police Department detective
- Abraham Lim as Ben Park, a ruthless reporter and associate producer for GBZ Online who follows Nick's case and is determined to interview the family
- Adrian Grenier as Nick Brewer, a family man who went missing after a video of him holding a sign that says: "I ABUSE WOMEN", then a second sign that says: "AT 5 MILLION VIEWS I DIE" went viral online and he failed to show up to work that morning
- Motell G Foster as Curtis Hamilton, a former colleague of Sophie's with whom she had an affair
- Jessie Collins as Emma Beesly, a woman who claimed to be Nick's mistress

=== Recurring ===
- Camaron Engels as Ethan Brewer, Sophie and Nick's older son
- Jaylin Fletcher as Kai Brewer, Sophie and Nick's younger son
- Liz Alexander as Andrea Brewer, Pia and Nick's mother
- Becca Lish as Dawn Gleed, the administration manager at the Merritt Sports Performance Center
- Wally Dunn as Ed Gleed, Dawn's husband
- Ian Meadows as Matt Aldin, Nick's best friend and colleague at the Merritt Sports Performance Center
- Steve Mouzakis as Det. Zach De Luca
- Salme Geransar as Det. Majano
- Ezra Bix as Det. Josephson
- Dean Cartmel as Det. Feldman
- Kate Lister as Jeannine Murphy
- Joyce Guy as Ruby, Sophie's mother
- Jack Walton as Vince, a patient of Pia who helps her find out what happened to Nick
- Jake Speer as Cameron, Ben's partner
- Adel Della Massa as Paula
- Emily Goddard as Linda, the administration coordinator at the Merritt Sports Performance Center
- Mia Challis as Jenny
- Jake Unsworth as Colin Howard
- Akosia Sabet as Bailey Quinn
- Renee Lim as Alice, Sophie's friend who is also her attorney
- Alexis Watt as Jessica Centeno
- Debra Lawrance as Principal Heller

=== Guest ===
- Daniel Henshall as Simon Burton, the brother of a woman named Sarah Burton who committed suicide after Jeremy Wilkerson (one of Nick's alleged dating profile pseudonyms) told her to kill herself
- Andrea Demetriades as Audrey
- Georgina Naidu as Prisha Kapoor
- Danielle Carter as Wendy McFarland, TV Debate Moderator
- Paula Arundell as Tanisha

== Episodes ==
No.	Title	Directed by	Written by	Original release date
1	"The Sister"	Brad Anderson	Tony Ayres & Christian White	August 25, 2021
Pia Brewer's patient Vince shows her a video of her brother Nick, beaten and holding up a card that reads "I abuse women", followed by one that says "At 5 million views I die." Pia and Nick's wife Sophie go to the police, where Detective Roshan assures them they will verify the video. After a second video emerges of Nick holding a sign that reads "I killed a woman", the investigation moves from a missing persons case to Homicide. Vince tells Pia he started an online community to examine the videos for clues on Nick's location, revealing that Nick was being held in a delivery van of a specific model. The police track down the van, but the video has already reached five million views.
2	"The Detective"	Emma Freeman	Tony Ayres & Christian White	August 25, 2021
It is confirmed that Nick was held in the abandoned van where the videos were filmed. Senior Detective DeLuca from Homicide is now in charge, and takes Detective Roshan off the case. Roshan promises Pia that if she requests his continued involvement in the case, he will keep her updated about the investigation. Roshan discovers Ethan has a tablet, where he is monitoring Geonicking, an app where volunteers map where they have searched for Nick. Roshan shows DeLuca the application, after he continues to minimize his involvement. Roshan tracks down a bar Nick had been to, where he finds surveillance footage of Nick engaging in a brawl. Using the GeoNicking app to narrow down search areas, Roshan locates Nick's corpse. He is promoted to the Homicide department.
3	"The Wife"	Brad Anderson	Pete McTighe	August 25, 2021
Roshan and DeLuca ask Sophie if she can identify the man in the surveillance footage. She names Curtis Hamilton, a former colleague. DeLuca and Roshan arrest Curtis when he refuses to surrender his digital devices, and Sophie discloses her affair to the police. Sophie confronts a woman who has been following her. She introduces herself as Emma, saying she was in a relationship with Nick, who used the pseudonym 'Danny Walters'. Pia asks Vince to help retrieve the deleted 'Danny Walters' profile from the dating site, and he later confirms that Danny Walters is Nick.
4	"The Mistress"	Emma Freeman	Melissa Scrivner Love	August 25, 2021
It is revealed that the day Nick was kidnapped, Emma was at the gym, learning of his situation via the news. She goes to Oakland to find out more, and while waiting outside the Brewer house, a reporter, Ben Park gives her his business card. The day after Sophie confronts Emma, Emma gives a statement to Detective Roshan, then goes to Nick's workplace and meets Matt. Pia learns about Emma from Matt, and confronts her. Emma later receives a threatening phone call telling her to leave town and is run off the road. At the hospital, Pia tells her Emma Nick had multiple online personas where he met different women. Emma meets with one of the other women who knew Nick, and discovers Nick told Mandy the same things he told her. She then appears in an interview with Ben Park where she exposes Nick.
5	"The Reporter"	Ben Young	Bradford Winters and Tony Ayres	August 25, 2021
Ben Park shows the interview with Emma to his editor, who orders him to get an interview with Sophie. He is caught trespassing at the Brewer home by Pia. Ben later discovers Jenny commenting on an online forum that anyone who defends Nick did not really know him. He interviews Jenny the next day, who tells him that Tara, a girl on the volleyball team, may have left due to abuse from Nick. Sophie threatens to sue the network for Ben's trespassing. Dakota offers not to air the interview with Emma if Sophie does an interview with them. Sophie agrees and Dakota removes Ben from the story. Ben finds a dating persona Nick used. He obtains access to the profile, and discovers that Nick was involved with a woman named Maggie Oxley. He tracks her location, and learns that the name was an alias for Sarah Burton who died four months ago. Ben tracks down her brother, Simon, breaks into his apartment and finds Sarah's phone, discovering that Nick was ignoring her and goading her to commit suicide. Ben brings this information to Dakota, and asks to be Sophie's interviewer or he will take the information to a rival network. During the interview, Ben ambushes Sophie, causing her to storm out.
6	"The Brother"	Ben Young	Bradford Winters	August 25, 2021
Simon Burton learned that his sister Sarah had begun a relationship with someone named 'Jeremy'. Four months before the events of the first episode, the relationship soured and Simon discovered that Jeremy goaded Sarah into suicide. With the help of his friend Darryl, Simon uncovered 'Jeremy' as Nick. Roshan questions Simon about Nick, but he feigns ignorance. Simon and Darryl are later arrested, and Simon reflects on how they kidnapped Nick and forced him to hold the cards for the videos. Simon tells Roshan that he will only give a statement if he can talk to Pia, who agrees. Simon reveals to Pia that when he realized Nick was innocent, he let him go. Nick had told Simon that he knew who was responsible, promising to make them pay. Simon tells Pia that he does not know who killed Nick, but it was neither him nor Darryl.
7	"The Son"	Cherie Nowlan	Melissa Scrivner Love and Tony Ayres	August 25, 2021
After watching an interview with Mandy Harrison, Ethan suspects that she never met Nick in person, which she confirms via email. Ethan then contacts Emma, who also admits to never having met Nick in person. Ethan's friend Alison says that if he has the pictures the catfish sent Emma, she can track where they were sent from. Pia realises that since the catfish knew details about their lives, it has to be someone Nick knew well. Vince reveals that there were rumors that Nick was involved with Tara Wilson. Pia learns that Tara was actually seeing Matt, who began harassing her and posting naked pictures of her online. Pia goes to Nick's workplace, where his colleague Dawn gives her access to Matt's computer. Pia finds nude photos of Tara and the pictures used for Nick's dating profiles. Kai sees Ethan's computer, where Alison has sent over the location where the pictures were sent from. He heads to the location, armed with a baseball bat. Sophie discovers him missing and calls Pia.
8	"The Answer"	Cherie Nowlan	Tony Ayres	August 25, 2021
Ethan realizes that Kai was on his computer and saw the location that Alison sent. Kai knocks on the door of the catfish and Dawn answers. Believing it to be a prank by Ethan, Kai accepts Dawn and her husband Ed's invitation to come in before they drive him home. After learning how Kai found them, Ed retrieves a gun. Two years ago, when Nick first began working at the college, Dawn helped set up his computer, learning his usernames and passwords. She began impersonating Nick, setting up multiple dating profiles, but was discovered by Ed. When Sarah Burton messaged to ask why she was being ignored, Dawn goaded her into committing suicide. Ed and Dawn pretend to drive Kai home as Sophie and Pia arrive and learn that Dawn was the catfish. Ed and Dawn take Kai to a ranch and lock him inside a trailer. Kai learns that after Simon released Nick, he came to confront Dawn, but Ed killed him. Kai escapes but Ed and Dawn chase him and he hides. The police arrive and search the ranch, arresting Dawn and killing Ed

== Production ==
In August 2019, it was announced Netflix would produce an 8-episode series created and produced by Tony Ayres and Christian White, with David Heyman serving as producer under his Heyday Television banner, with Brad Anderson set as lead director. In December 2019, Zoe Kazan, Betty Gabriel, Adrian Grenier and Phoenix Raei joined the cast. In February 2020, Abraham Lim, Jessie Collins, Ian Meadows, Daniel Henshall, Motell Foster, Jaylin Fletcher and Cameron Engels joined the cast. Principal photography began in December 2019. Production on the series was suspended in March 2020 due to the COVID-19 pandemic. In November 2020, the series resumed filming in Melbourne. Clickbait was released on Netflix on August 25, 2021.

== Reception ==
=== Critical reception ===
The review aggregator website Rotten Tomatoes reports a 58% approval rating with an average rating of 6.3/10, based on 31 critic reviews. The website's critics consensus reads: "With an array of flashy, half-formed ideas and thin characterizations, Clickbait is more akin to its namesake than the deeper show it aspires to be." Metacritic, which uses a weighted average, assigned a score of 48 out of 100 based on 12 critics, indicating "mixed or average reviews".

Roxana Hadadi writing for RogerEbert.com wrote: "Clickbait is a reminder of why Netflix series became such hits in the first place. A cast of recognizable, serviceable actors dive with melodrama and zeal into a narrative that defies logical sense but moves at a breakneck pace, ends on cliffhangers like clockwork, and incorporates just enough zigs and zags to keep viewers guessing."

Adam Sweeting at The Arts Desk described the series as a "fiendishly cunning thriller" and concluded that "the way Ayres and White handle their final-reel reveal is a masterclass in advanced whodunnitry. They even helpfully lob in a subsidiary could-be villain as a decoy. We are left to ponder whether Clickbait is itself clickbait."

Saloni Gajjar writing for The A.V. Club criticized the show for its "ridiculous bait-and-switch twists and red herrings, offering very little else."

James Croot writing for www.stuff.co.nz wrote that "as a police procedural and heart-stopping horror, it is aces, evoking memories of David Fincher’s finest (Seven, Panic Room), ratcheting up the stakes as the video’s ticker goes into overdrive."

=== Viewership ===
Between August 23 and September 12, 2021, Clickbait was the most-viewed original streaming title in the US for three consecutive weeks according to Nielsen Holdings

Clickbait was the most viewed series on Netflix in the United States in September 2021, and the fourth biggest show globally.

Clickbait was the most viewed series on Netflix in the UK in August and September 2021.

The Sydney Morning Herald reported that Clickbait hit the No.1 spot on Netflix in more than 20 countries.

== See also ==
- Catfishing
- Dating app
