= Abruptio =

2023 puppet horror film

- Theatrical release poster
- Directed by: Evan Marlowe
- Written by: Evan Marlowe
- Produced by: Kerry Marlowe
- Starring: James Marsters; Christopher McDonald; Hana Mae Lee; Jordan Peele; Sid Haig; Robert Englund
- Cinematography: Evan Marlowe
- Edited by: Evan Marlowe
- Music by: Patrick Savage; Holeg Spies
- Production companies: HellBent Pictures, LLC.; Sweet Home Films
- Distributed by: Anchor Bay Entertainment
- Release dates: January 17, 2023 (Santa Monica Film Festival); September 27, 2024 (United States)
- Running time: 94 minutes
- Country: United States
- Language: English

Abruptio is a 2023 American adult puppet horror film written, edited, and directed by Evan Marlowe. Produced by Kerry Marlowe, the film stars James Marsters, Hana Mae Lee, Christopher McDonald, Jordan Peele, Robert Englund, and Sid Haig in one of his final films before his death on September 21, 2019.

Abruptio had its world premiere online at the Santa Monica Film Festival on January 17, 2023, prior to its theatrical release by Anchor Bay Entertainment on September 27, 2024.

== Plot ==
Les Hackel is an office worker who lives with his overbearing mother and is recently dumped by his girlfriend Allison. One night, while chatting online with his best friend Danny, he reveals that they both have bombs implanted in the backs of their necks.

As Les arrives at Danny's house, Danny pulls out a gun and attempts to kill him, but hesitates and is unable to go through with it. As a result, the bomb implanted in Danny's neck detonates, killing him. Les then discovers a suitcase and receives a text message instructing him to open it at his office without informing anyone—under the threat of death. Upon opening the suitcase at work, a toxic gas is released, killing everyone in the office as Les escapes unharmed.

Les later arrives at a nightclub called Diamonds and Purrls, where he meets Sal Cheek, a struggling comedian whose act fails to amuse the audience. Like Les, Sal also has a bomb implanted in his neck. The two are subsequently sent to a suburban home where they are ordered to kill the family residing there. After carrying out the gruesome task, they receive a message instructing them to kill each other. In response, Les decapitates Sal with a shovel.

Afterward, Les is apprehended by a police officer named Dennis and brought to a station where he is interrogated by Police Chief Richter. Richter demands that Les "confess" to an unspecified crime, but when Les is unable to comply, he is strapped into a device known as "The Confessional" and subjected to electrocution. He later awakens on the side of the road with a piece of paper bearing the word "think."

Les then arrives at a warehouse, where he meets Clive, a sarcastic and abrasive English man. The two are instructed to rob a convenience store together. During the heist, Clive knocks Les unconscious, steals the money, and leaves him tied up and abandoned in the warehouse.

Later, a young woman named Chelsea arrives after being assaulted by a group of men. Les and Chelsea flee the scene and drive back to the house where the earlier killings occurred. As they begin to form a bond, Chelsea persuades Les to bury the family's bodies. During the process, Les discovers barcodes on both his and Sal's necks, revealing personal statistics and further suggesting they are part of a larger, orchestrated system.

Les later receives a message directing him to meet a man named Mr. Salk, a meticulous clean freak. The two are instructed to dispose of several dead bodies by throwing them into a set of large spinning blades. Among the bodies is Allison, Les's ex-girlfriend. Mr. Salk hesitates and is unable to complete the task, resulting in the detonation of the bomb implanted in his neck.

Les and Chelsea awaken to a song that Les recognizes, which is revealed to be emanating from Sal's body. Les cuts open Sal's stomach and discovers a USB drive inside. Upon plugging it in, the drive displays a combination of Egyptian hieroglyphs and binary code. Les then opens a nearby door, briefly revealing a surreal hellscape and a massive, alien-like creature before quickly shutting it. When the mysterious song begins playing again, Les, believing he may also have something hidden inside him, attempts to cut open his own stomach, but is stopped by Chelsea.

Les visits his doctor and recounts the bizarre events he has experienced. The doctor, believing Les to be delusional, commits him to a psychiatric facility. There, Les meets a nurse named Victoria. While exploring the hospital, Les discovers a hidden room where he witnesses a surgical procedure involving the implantation of a bomb into a patient.

Les eventually finds himself in a secretive location known as "The Colony," where women are being impregnated by aliens to produce alien-human hybrids. Disturbed by what he sees, Les instructs Victoria to destroy the alien eggs. However, one of the eggs hatches, and the emerging creature attacks Victoria as Les escapes from the colony.

Les and Chelsea travel to an abandoned amusement park called LA LA Joyland, a place Les remembers from his childhood. While exploring the park, Chelsea is knocked unconscious by Clive, who has returned and attempts to kill Les. Les hides atop the rollercoaster tracks and strangles Clive to death with a rope.

Afterward, Les encounters two alien beings. As he returns to his car, Chelsea—now implanted with a bomb in her neck—is compelled to kill him. Les, however, undoes the stitches on her neck, stunning her. He then steps through a mysterious door, which transports him back to his parents' house.

Les discovers that his mother is harboring a brood of alien-human hybrid infants in the garage. He kills her with a pair of hedge shears and sets the garage on fire after dousing it with gasoline. Les is once again apprehended by Officer Dennis and brought back to Chief Richter.

Subjected once more to "The Confessional," Les experiences a flashback revealing that, while driving drunk, he struck and killed a biker and did not report it. This incident prompted him to quit drinking and begin attending Alcoholics Anonymous meetings. Satisfied with this long-suppressed confession, Richter releases Les.

Chelsea, revealed to have survived, reunites with Les. Richter suggests that the biker's family deserves to know the truth and Les and Chelsea share a kiss.

Back in his bedroom, Les calls 911 and prepares to confess his crime as he transitions from a puppet to a human.

== Cast ==
- James Marsters as Les Hackel, Danny's best friend
- Christopher McDonald as Police Chief Richter
- Hana Mae Lee as Chelsea
- Jordan Peele as Danny, Les Hackel's best friend
- Sid Haig as Sal Cheek
- Robert Englund as Mr. Salk
- Ross King as Lloyd, Les Hackel's boss
- Rich Fulcher as Dummkopf
- Carole Ruggier as Doreen Hackel, Les Hackel's mother
- Patrick Cavanaugh as Dennis
- Kerry Marlowe as Allison, Les Hackel's girlfriend

== Production ==
=== Voice recording ===
Voice recording started on May 23, 2015, in Los Angeles, California, with Evan Marlowe serving as cinematographer. Recording sessions wrapped on December 2, 2017. In December 2017, several actors were confirmed to have voiced characters, including James Marsters, Robert Englund, Sid Haig, Jordan Peele, Hana Mae Lee, and Christopher McDonald.

=== Production ===
On September 23, 2019, the film's crew relayed their feelings towards the passing of co-star Sid Haig, while confirming they would finish production on Abruptio soon, for a then-projected release in 2020. In April 2020, Marlowe revealed information about the film's production:

Abruptio is a puppet movie. We resolved (for some insane reason) to use only realistic lifelike hand puppets in actual settings, just like any other movie. No CGI backgrounds or actors wearing prosthetic makeup. This sort of thing has never been done. The Dark Crystal comes close, though there, the designers weren't bound by the confines of reality. We've had a few incredibly skilled people helping out. Jeff Farley has been our lead puppet fabricator. Again, this kind of work isn't common, so some amount of trial and error has been needed to find the balance of aesthetic, durability and function. Meaning, the heads need to look great on camera, hold up well under shooting environments that are often hostile, and let the puppeteer emote without too much effort. When it comes to the actual shoot, our puppeteer Danny Montooth lip syncs with each line, played on loop on my magical iPad until all the aspects (lighting, camera movement, mouth motion, eye line) are just right. Once I've got the footage, I edit it up and then our visual effects guy John Sellings smooths out any problems. When a scene is done, it gets color-corrected and graded, and then the sound and score are added. I'd estimate a good 30% of the film is ready to go. We were set to shoot another 30% this year when the coronavirus shut down production. Who knows what the immediate future of film production will be, not only for major studio work but small-scale (read: zero crew) productions like ours? We hope we can rev back up this year.

In a June 2020 interview, the film's director Evan Marlowe revealed that with "six years in, we're still not quite halfway done filming. We plan to pick up where we left off in the coming months." In August 2020, production resumed, with coronavirus safety protocols in place, including limited crew members. Filming wrapped on March 4, 2021, before post-production wrapped by March 2022. In August 2022, the film was completed.

== Release ==
=== Theatrical ===
Abruptio was theatrically released by Anchor Bay Entertainment on September 27, 2024. The film had its online world premiere at the Santa Monica Film Festival on January 17, 2023. The film also streamed online at the Cinequest Film & Creativity Festival on March 1, before its physical screenings on August 26 and 29, 2023. It had its public theatrical premiere at the Panic Film Fest on April 15, before having its International debut at the Fantaspoa Film Festival on April 28 and 30 and its European premiere at the Dundead Film Festival on May 12. It also played theatrically at the Malibu Film Festival on May 21, the Dark Bridges Film Festival on June 4, the Lighthouse International Film Festival on June 9, the Desertscape Film Festival and Days of the Dead Indianapolis Film Festival on June 23, the Film Invasion LA festival on June 25, the Galacticat Film Festival on June 26 and 29, the Motor City Nightmares Film Festival on July 28, the Atlanta Underground Film Festival on August 4, the Popcorn Frights Film Festival on August 12, the Rhode Island International Film Festival on August 13, the Macabro Film Festival on August 18 and 19, the HorrorHound Film Fest on August 20, the Days of the Dead Los Angeles Film Festival on August 26, Grimmfest on October 8, the Atlanta Horror Film Festival and the Fargo Fantastic Film Festival on October 14, the Fright Nights Film Festival and Ramaskrik Film Festival on October 19, the TOHorror Fantastic Film Festival on October 20, the Tucson Terrorfest and the Chicago Horror Film Fest on October 22, the Cine-Excess and Tysvær Skrekkfest on October 27, the Nightmares Film Festival and the Vortex Film Festival on October 28, the Curtas Festival of the Imaginary on October 31, the South African Horrorfest on November 2, the Night Visions Film Festival on November 11, the Buenos Aires Rojo Sangre Film Festival on November 23 and 24, and the Soho Horror Film Festival on November 30. The film was originally set for release in 2021.

=== Home media ===
The film was released on Blu-ray, DVD and Ultra HD Blu-ray on December 10, 2024.

== Reception ==
=== Critical response ===
On the review aggregator website Rotten Tomatoes, 87% of 15 critics' reviews are positive, with an average rating of 7.7/10.

Erik Piepenburg of The New York Times wrote the film is an "exceptional sociopolitical thriller that’s equal parts body horror exploitation flick, science-fiction survival drama and ultraviolent shoot-’em-up." David Gelmini of Dread Central wrote, "Viewers who are not perturbed by the use of human-sized puppets will commend Abruptio for its unique visual-style and its audacious premise. And those who are too perturbed by its irregularity will still find it too damn strange to completely ignore". Stephanie Malone writing for Morbidly Beautiful gave it 5 out of 5 butterflies, calling the film "the total package", while praising the story, character development and detail of the puppets. Anton Bitel, writing for Projected Figures, said the film "is a schizophrenic skedaddle from reality, reflected even in the heavily stylised medium that Marlowe has adopted, and ending with one hell of a hangover. The ensuing cavalcade of unease and wrong disturbs and repels, both in equal measure, and in the best possible way." Carla Davis of 1428 Elm called the film "a trippy, gory puppet horror masterpiece," particularly noting its visuals as "eye-popping" and the level of voice talent and writing which "takes it over the top." Jennie Kermode of Eye for Film gave a positive review, writing the film "stands out because of its format but has a strong narrative and smart ideas behind it". Alan French of Sunshine State Cineplex gave a positive review, summarizing that the film is "one of the most visually unique films of 2023".

In a negative review, Kyle Logan of Cultured Vultures said the film "is a singular film on almost every level, which makes it worth seeking out for fans of weird movies, but it has some ideological issues and isn't quite good enough to transcend its niche." Logan also characterises the film as misogynistic, a criticism echoed by Catherine Benstead of Hear Us Scream.

=== Accolades ===
The film garnered a total of 20 awards during its 2023 festival run.

At the 2023 Panic Film Fest, the film won the award for Best Visual Effects. At the 2023 Days of the Dead Film Festival, Sid Haig's posthumous performance was nominated for Best Villain, while James Marsters won the award for Best Actor and Evan Marlowe won for Best Director. At Film Invasion Los Angeles, the film won the awards for Best Director (Feature), Best Screenplay (Feature), Best Horror Feature, and Best Performance by a Full Cast. At the 2023 Galacticat Film Festival, the film won the award for Best Effects. At the 2023 Motor City Nightmares Film Festival, the film won the award for Best Effects. At the 2023 Film Invasion LA Festival, the film won the awards for Best Feature Film and Best Director. At Film Threat's Award This! the film won the award for WTF Indie like "What the F**k is This Movie Even?" and Evan Marlowe won the award for Best Director.

Bloody Disgusting named the film one of the "10 Hidden Horror Gems" of 2024. British Film Institute included the film on its Ultimate Horror Watchlist.
