= Black Site (2022 film) =

2022 American film by Sophia Banks

- Release poster
- Directed by: Sophia Banks
- Written by: Jinder Ho
- Produced by: Basil Iwanyk; Mike Gabrawy; Todd Fellman; Jason Clarke; Craig McMahon; Erica Lee
- Starring: Jason Clarke; Michelle Monaghan; Jai Courtney
- Cinematography: Donald M. McAlpine
- Edited by: Scott Gray
- Music by: Patrick Savage
- Production companies: MEP Capital; Elevate Production Finance; Rocket Science; Asbury Park Pictures; Story Bridge Films
- Distributed by: Redbox Entertainment; Vertical Entertainment
- Release date: May 3, 2022
- Running time: 92 minutes
- Country: United States
- Language: English

Black Site is a 2022 American action-thriller film directed by Sophia Banks and written by Jinder Ho. The film stars Jason Clarke, Michelle Monaghan, and Jai Courtney. It was released on May 3, 2022, by Vertical Entertainment and Redbox.

== Premise ==
A group of officers based in the Citadel, a top-secret CIA–Five Eyes black site in Jordan, must fight for their lives in a cat-and-mouse game against Hatchet, a brilliant and infamous high-value detainee, who got himself on the black site on purpose. This would also lead him to escape from Abigail Trent, who joins the CIA to find out who is responsible for destroying a hospital that killed her husband and daughter.

== Cast ==
- Jason Clarke as Hatchet, a high value detainee
- Michelle Monaghan as Abigail "Abby" Trent, a CIA PsyOps officer and Citadel second in command
- Jai Courtney as Raymond Miller, a CIA contractor and former 1st Battalion Marine
- Pallavi Sharda as Tessa Harijan, a CIA officer and translator
- Fayssal Bazzi as Rashid Nassar, a CIA officer and Citadel Head of Operations
- Uli Latukefu as Captain David Palau, a Delta Force operator
- Phoenix Raei as Uri Wasserman, a Mossad liaison officer
- Todd Lasance as Wesley, an Australian Army soldier
- Lincoln Lewis as Landon Briggs, an Australian Army soldier
- Pacharo Mzembe as Ben Jordan, a US Army soldier
- Simon Elrahi as Farhan Barakat, a Citadel detainee linked to Hatchet
- Jordan Murphy as Silas Allen, a high ranking CIA official

== Production ==
On January 25, 2021, it was announced that Sophia Banks would be directing Black Site, an action-thriller film written by Jinder Ho and starring Jason Clarke, Michelle Monaghan, and Jai Courtney. The following month, principal photography began in Gold Coast, Australia, in the midst of the COVID-19 pandemic, with Uli Latukefu, Pallavi Sharda, Phoenix Raei, and Fayssal Bazzi joining the cast. Filming also took place in Byron Bay, New South Wales. By June 2021, the film was in post-production.

== Release ==
The film was released on May 3, 2022, by Redbox and Vertical Entertainment.

== Reception ==
On the review aggregator website Rotten Tomatoes, 29% from seven reviews are mixed, with an average rating of 5.0/10.
