= Betty Gabriel =

American actress (born 1981)

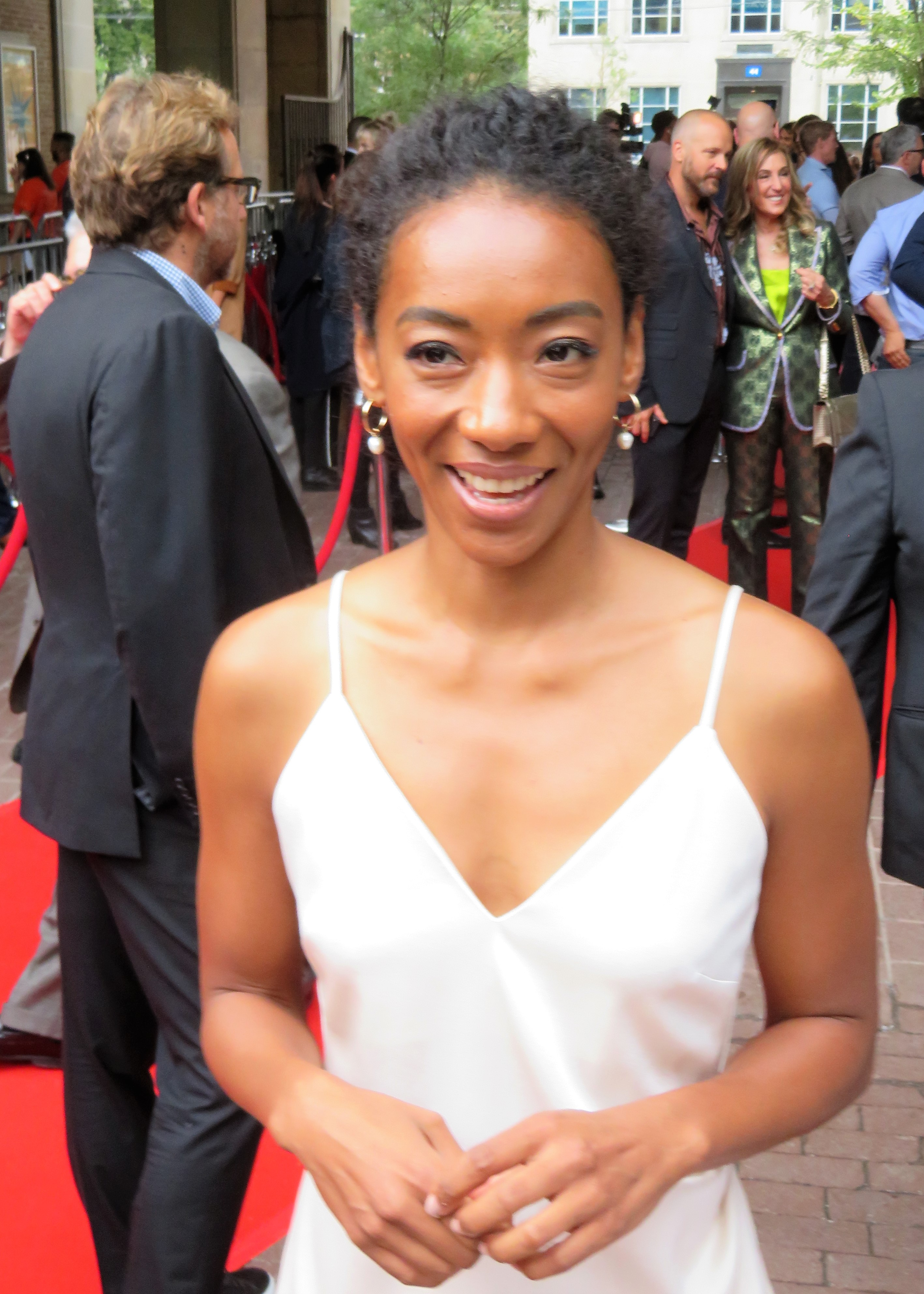
- Gabriel in 2019
- Born: January 6, 1981 (age 45); Washington, D.C., U.S.
- Education: Iowa State University (BS); Juilliard School (MFA)
- Occupation: Actress
- Years active: 2001–present

Betty Gabriel (born January 6, 1981) is an American actress. After acting in the Chicago theatre scene of the early 2000s, Gabriel became known for starring in horror films produced by Blumhouse, which established her as a scream queen.

Gabriel achieved commercial success with the horror films The Purge: Election Year (2016) and Get Out (2017); her portrayal of a housekeeper in the latter netted a career breakthrough. Her continued horror roles include the films Unfriended: Dark Web (2018) and It Lives Inside (2023), and the miniseries Clickbait (2021). She also stars in the action film Upgrade (2018), the drama film Adopt a Highway (2019), the comedy film Novocaine (2025), and the action thriller Jack Ryan: Ghost War (2026).

On television, Gabriel appears in the period drama series Good Girls Revolt (2016), the dystopian series Westworld (2018), the science fiction series Counterpart (2018–2019), the miniseries Defending Jacob (2020), and the action series Jack Ryan (2022–2023).

== Early life ==
Gabriel was born January 6, 1981, in Washington, D.C., and grew up in Pittsburgh, Pennsylvania, and in Hyattsville, Maryland. In 2002, Gabriel received a Bachelor of Science degree in Animal Science from Iowa State University. After college, Gabriel relocated to Chicago, studying modern dance and working as an actress in the Chicago theater community. In 2014, she graduated with a Master of Fine Arts in drama from Juilliard.

== Career ==
After doing a bit of theater at Iowa State University, Gabriel got her start working as an actress and dancer in Chicago theater, first as part of her further studies, and then in various productions. Gabriel's first film role was in the 2011 drama In Memoriam. She began her career as a television actress with minor recurring roles in Good Girls Revolt and Westworld before landing her first major film role in the 2016 horror sequel The Purge: Election Year.

Gabriel was on vacation when she was invited to audition for Get Out. Her character allows viewers to consider whether "the American dream" has become "the American nightmare" for many African-Americans. To prepare for the role, Gabriel watched the TEDx talk of Martin Pistorius to get insight into the feeling of being trapped inside one's own body. She also watched Bride of Frankenstein and talked to her own grandmother, who was raised in Alabama, about racial tensions from her era. Get Out was a critical and commercial success, and her performance was discussed as a contender for Best Supporting Actress for the 2018 Academy Awards by Variety and The New York Times; the latter publication cited her work among of the best performances of the year.

In 2017, Gabriel joined the cast of Westworld as the character Maling. In February 2018, it was announced she would join the second season of Counterpart playing an FBI agent. She also starred opposite Logan Marshall-Green in the sci-fi action horror film Upgrade (2018), written and directed by Leigh Whannell, and shot on location in Melbourne, Australia.

In March 2021, Gabriel had a role in the animated horror film The Spine of Night, written and directed by Philip Gelatt and Morgan Galen King. Later in August 2021, she continued her career in the horror genre by playing the role of Sophie Brewer in the Netflix miniseries Clickbait (2021), co-written by Christian White and Tony Ayres, and despite the miniseries receiving a 59% on Rotten Tomatoes, it received 1.46 billion minutes of watchtime in one week following its debut.

Gabriel also appeared in the Apple TV+ limited series Manhunt, as well as having a recurring role in the TV series Jack Ryan for its third season in 2022.

== Filmography ==
=== Film ===
Year	Film	Role	Notes
2009	Maidenhead	Isabeau	Short film
2011	In Memoriam	Kayla	
2013	He's Way More Famous Than You	Hairstylist	
2013	The Story of Your Life	Houston	
2015	Experimenter	Sally	
2016	The Purge: Election Year	Laney Rucker	
2017	Get Out	Georgina/Marianne Armitage	
2017	Beyond Skyline	Jones	
2018	Diverted Eden	Shirley	
2018	Unfriended: Dark Web	Nari Jemisin	
2018	Upgrade	Det. Cortez	
2019	Adopt a Highway	Deeks	
2019	Human Capital	Ronnie Manning	
2021	The Spine of Night	Phae-Agura	
2023	It Lives Inside	Joyce Dixon	
2025	Novocaine	Mincy Langston	
2026	Jack Ryan: Ghost War	Elizabeth Wright	
2027	Twilight of the Dead †		Post-production

=== Television ===
Year	Title	Role	Notes
2016	Good Girls Revolt	Denise	Recurring role
2016	12 Deadly Days	Willow Russell	Main role; miniseries
2018	Westworld	Maling	Recurring role; 4 episodes
2018–2019	Counterpart	Naya Temple	Main role
2019	The Twilight Zone	Herself	Episode: "Blurryman"
2020	Defending Jacob	Pam Duffy	Main role; miniseries
2021	Clickbait	Sophie Brewer	Main role; miniseries
2022–2023	Jack Ryan	Elizabeth Wright	Main role (seasons 3–4)
2024	Manhunt	Elizabeth Keckley	Recurring role; 3 episodes

=== Theater ===
- 2004: Black Nativity by Langston Hughes at Goodman Theatre (Chicago, Illinois)
- 2008: Space by Laura Jacqmin at Side Project Theatre (Chicago, Illinois)
- 2008: Pluto Was a Planet by Laura Jacqmin at Around the Coyote Gallery (Chicago, Illinois)
- 2009: The Comedy of Errors by William Shakespeare at Chase Park Theatre (Chicago, Illinois)

== Awards and nominations ==
Year	Nominated work	Award	Category	Result	Ref.
2017	Get Out	11th Fright Meter Awards	Best Supporting Actress	Nominated	
2017	Get Out	14th Women Film Critics Circle Awards	Invisible Woman Award	Won	
2018	Get Out	16th Gold Derby Awards	Best Ensemble Cast	Nominated	
2018	Get Out	18th Black Reel Awards	Best Supporting Actress	Nominated	
2018	Get Out	18th Black Reel Awards	Best Breakthrough Female Performance	Nominated	
2018	Get Out	24th Screen Actors Guild Awards	Outstanding Performance by a Cast in a Motion Picture	Nominated	
2022	Clickbait	53rd NAACP Image Awards	Outstanding Actress in a Television Movie, Mini-Series or Dramatic Special	Nominated	
