= Zach Woodlee =

American choreographer and dancer (born 1977)

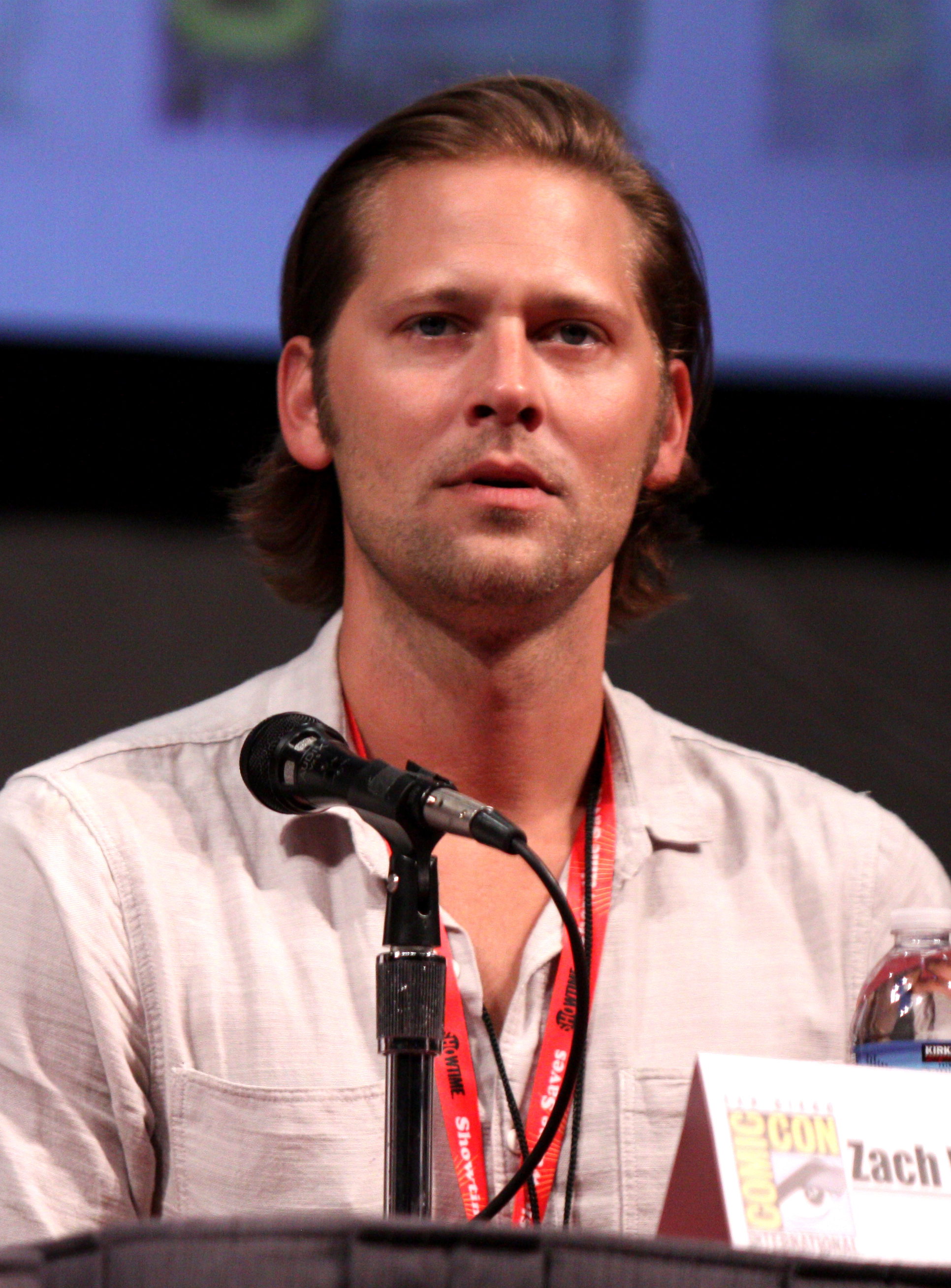
- Woodlee at San Diego Comic-Con in July 2011.
- Born: April 27, 1977 (age 48); Mesquite, Texas
- Education: Poteet High School
- Occupation(s): Dancer, Co-producer & Choreographer
- Years active: 1989-present
- Known for: Glee

Zach Woodlee (born April 27, 1977) is an American choreographer and dancer. He was choreographer and co-producer of the TV series Glee. He has choreographed many other films such as Hairspray and Bedtime Stories.

== Biography ==
=== Early life and education ===
Zachary Vinson Woodlee was born April 27, 1977, in Mesquite, Texas. He has three brothers, Matt, Beau and Slade, who all took dance classes. He graduated from Poteet High School in Mesquite. Woodlee was voted "Most Popular Guy" and was nicknamed "Mr. Poteet". He later went on to attend University of North Texas.

Zach Woodlee spent his early life in his mother's dance studio in Mesquite.

Woodlee starred in his first commercial, for Pop Rocks, when he was 12 years old. From there, he worked with the Kim Dawson studio in Dallas and won the UIL state competition for his role of Davey in a school play.

He can be seen appearing in Old Navy television ads. Some of his other commercial appearances include ads for Exxon, Sony and Abracat.com.

After graduating from Poteet High School in 1995, his parents encouraged him to attend college. He started looking into geriatrics, but his heart belonged to the stage. After a short stay, he decided to go to Los Angeles and try his luck there. "My heart just broke," said his mother, Vicki Woodlee. "We didn’t want him to go." Although he had no friends or connections in L.A., Woodlee auditioned for an apprenticeship at The Performing Arts Center in Van Nuys. He won a full scholarship. During his one year of study at the academy, Woodlee was bound by contract not to audition for any outside parts. Following completion, however, he has not stopped moving.

=== Career ===
Unlike agents in Dallas, agents in Los Angeles are specialized. Woodlee's agents have kept him working extensively. He has traveled and performed with Madonna, LeAnn Rimes and Mandy Moore. He can also be seen in the music video "Pinch Me" by the Barenaked Ladies and "Boom Boom" By performer Chayanne. He has appeared or choreographed in such movies as "Boys and Girls," Beautiful" and "Real Steel." Other acting bits include a role in the made-for-TV movie "These Old Broads" with Shirley MacLaine, Debbie Reynolds, Joan Collins and Elizabeth Taylor and the sitcom "Nikki". He was a back-up dancer for Madonna in her 2004 Re-Invention World Tour. Woodlee was also one of the choreographers Glee alongside Brooke Lipton and was the co-producer of the show. He also co-produced The Glee Project.

In January 2016, he choreographed Grease: Live.

He served as the head choreographer for the Disney Plus show High School Musical: The Musical: The Series.

== Choreographer/Assistant Choreographer ==
- Step Up (2006)
- Hairspray (2007)
- 27 Dresses (2008)
- Bedtime Stories (2008)
- Eli Stone (2008)
- Fired Up! (2009)
- Glee (2009–2015)
- How I Met Your Mother (2010)
- Starstruck (2010)
- Life as We Know It (2010)
- The Back-up Plan (2010)
- Eat Pray Love (2010)
- Real Steel (2011)
- The Secret (2016)
- Grease: Live (2016)
- Dumplin' (2018)
- High School Musical: The Musical: The Series (2019–2023)
- Hocus Pocus 2 (2022)
- Journey to Bethlehem (2023)

== Appearances ==
- (2001): Not Another Teen Movie as Dancer
- (2001): Buffy the Vampire Slayer, episode "Once More, with Feeling" as Demon/Henchman
- (2002): The Sweetest Thing as Dancer in Club
- (2003): From Justin to Kelly as Dancer
- (2003): Stuck On You as Dancer # 1 (credited as Zachary V. Woodlee)
- (2003): Charlie's Angels: Full Throttle as Reunion Dancer
- (2004): Bring It On Again as Cheerleader
- (2005): I'm Going to Tell You a Secret as himself
- (2011): The Glee Project as himself
- (2011): Glee: The 3D Concert Movie as himself
- (2012): "The Glee Project (season 2)" as himself
