= Works of David Hare =

David Hare plays, filmography, bibliography

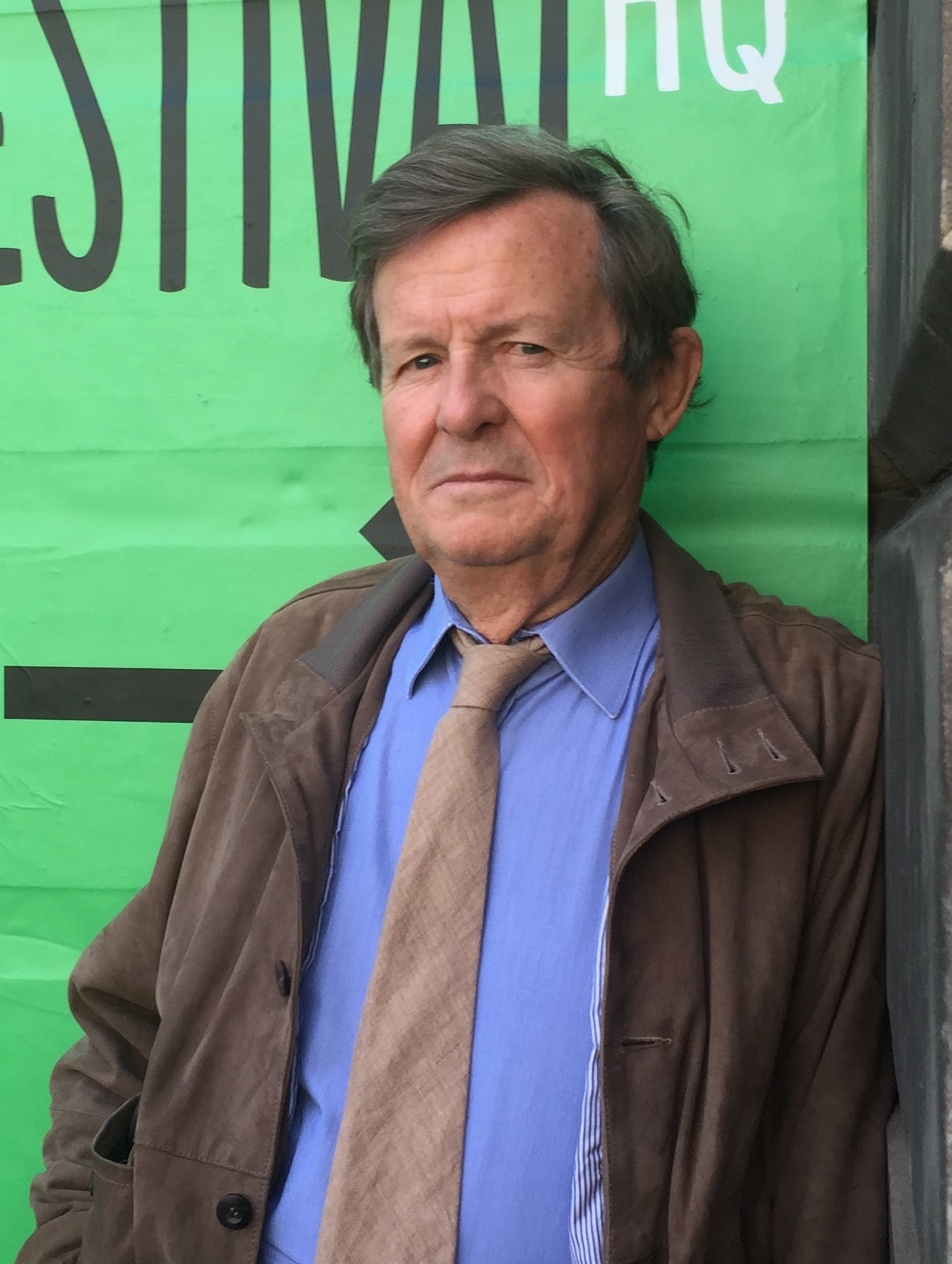
David Hare at the Edinburgh Film Festival in 2018

Sir David Hare is an English playwright, screenwriter, and director.

He is known for his theatrical works, including his acclaimed plays Pravda (1985), The Absence of War (1993), Skylight (1995), Amy's View (1997), and The Judas Kiss (1998). He is also known for his works on film and television. His notable film credits include Plenty (1985), The Hours (2002), and The Reader (2008), while his television works include Page Eight (2011) and Collateral (2018).

== Plays ==
- Inside Out (1968) (with Tony Bicat)
- How Brophy Made Good (1969)
- What Happened to Blake (1970)
- Slag (1970)
- The Great Exhibition (1972)
- Brassneck (1973) (with Howard Brenton)
- Knuckle (1974)
- Fanshen (1975). Based on William H. Hinton, Fanshen: Documentary of Revolution in a Chinese Village (1966)
- Teeth 'n' Smiles (1975)
- Plenty (1978)
- A Map of the World (1982)
- Pravda (1985) (with Howard Brenton)
- The Bay at Nice, and Wrecked Eggs (1986)
- The Knife (1987) (with Nick Bicat and Tim Rose Price)
- The Secret Rapture (1988)
- Racing Demon (1990)
- Murmuring Judges (1991)
- The Absence of War (1993)
- Skylight (1995; revived in London and on Broadway, in 2014 and 2015, respectively)
- Amy's View (1997)
- Ivanov (1997; revised and revived 2015) (adapted from Anton Chekhov)
- The Blue Room (1998) (adapted from Arthur Schnitzler)
- The Judas Kiss (1998)
- Via Dolorosa (1998)
- My Zinc Bed (2000)
- Platonov (2001; revived 2015) (adapted from Chekhov)
- The Breath of Life (2002)
- The Permanent Way (2003)
- Stuff Happens (2004)
- The Vertical Hour (2006)
- Gethsemane (2008)
- Berlin (2009)
- Wall (2009)
- The Power of Yes (2009)
- South Downs (2011)
- Behind the Beautiful Forevers (2014) (adapted from Behind the Beautiful Forevers)
- The Seagull (2015) (adapted from Chekhov)
- The Moderate Soprano (2015)
- The Red Barn (2016) (adapted from The Man on the Bench in the Barn)
- I'm Not Running (2018)
- Beat the Devil (2020)
- Straight Line Crazy (2022)
- Grace Pervades (2025)
- Montauk (upcoming, 2027)

== Filmography ==
=== Film ===
- Wetherby (1985)
- Plenty (1985) - based on his play
- Damage (1992)
- The Secret Rapture (1993) - based on his play
- The Hours (2002) - based on the novel by Michael Cunningham
- The Reader (2008) - based on the novel by Bernhard Schlink
- Denial (2016)
- The White Crow (2018)

=== Television ===
- Licking Hitler (1978)
- Dreams of Leaving (1980)
- Strapless (1989)
- The Absence of War (1995) - based on his play
- My Zinc Bed (2008) - based on his play
- Page Eight (2011)
- Turks & Caicos (2014
- Salting the Battlefield (2014)
- Collateral (2018)
- Roadkill (2020)
- Beat the Devil (2021)
- Worricker Trilogy

=== Unproduced scripts ===
- The Corrections (2007) - based on the novel by Jonathan Franzen
- Murder in Samarkand (2008) - based on the memoir by Craig Murray, former British Ambassador to Uzbekistan

== Directing credits ==
- Licking Hitler for BBC1's Play for Today (1978)
- Dreams of Leaving for BBC1's Play for Today (1980)
- Wetherby (1985)
- Paris by Night (1988)
- Strapless (1989)
- Heading Home (1991) (TV film)
- The Young Indiana Jones Chronicles - episode "Paris, May 1919" (1993)
- The Designated Mourner, written by Wallace Shawn (1997)
- The Year of Magical Thinking (2007) (Broadway play by Joan Didion starring Vanessa Redgrave)
- Page Eight (2011)
- Turks & Caicos (2014)
- Salting the Battlefield (2014)

== Bibliography ==
=== Books ===
- Writing Left-Handed (Faber & Faber 1991)
- Acting Up (A diary on his experiences of acting in his own play, the one-man-show on the topic of Israel/Palestine, Via Dolorosa)
- Obedience, Struggle and Revolt (Faber and Faber, 2005)
- About Hare by Richard Boon (Faber and Faber, 2006)
- The Blue Touch Paper (Faber and Faber, 2015)
- We Travelled: Essays and Poems (Faber and Faber, 2021)

=== Articles ===
- Hare, David (30 April 2009). "Wall: A Monologue". The New York Review of Books. 56 (7): 8–12.

== See also ==
- List of awards and nominations received by David Hare
- List of British playwrights since 1950
- List of Academy Award winners and nominees from Great Britain
- List of European Academy Award winners and nominees
