= List of awards and nominations received by David Hare =

Sir David Hare awards and nominations
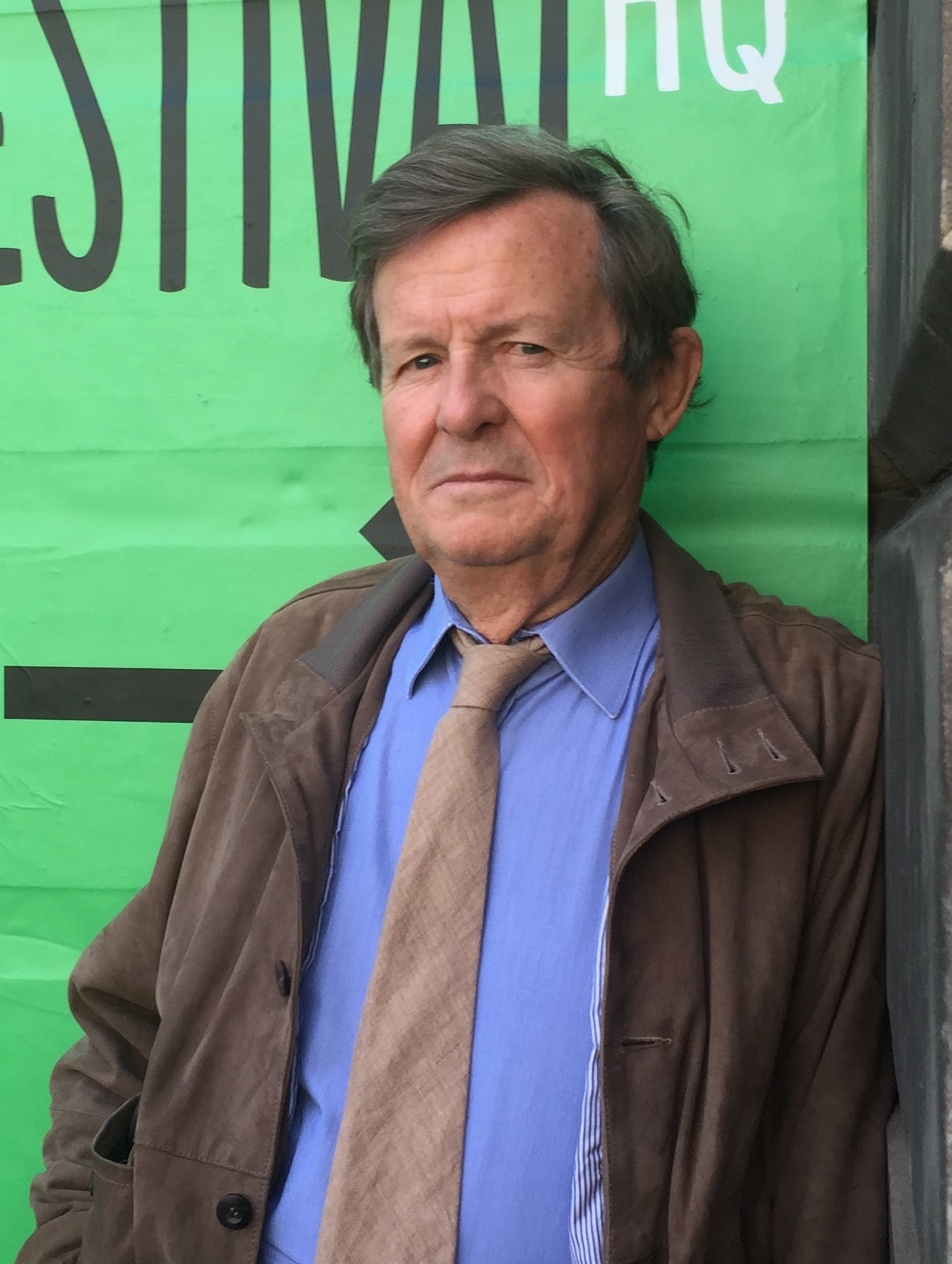
Awards and nominations
Award	Wins	Nominations
Academy Awards	0	2
BAFTA Awards	1	5
Golden Globe Award	0	2
Olivier Awards	2	8
Tony Awards	0	3

Totals (Note: Certain award groups do not simply award one winner. They acknowledge several different recipients, have runners-up, and have third place. Since this is a specific recognition and is different from losing an award, runner-up mentions are considered wins in this award tally. For simplification and to avoid errors, each award in this list has been presumed to have had a prior nomination.)
- Wins: 32
- Nominations: 67

Sir David Hare is an English playwright, screenwriter, and director. Known for his work on stage and screen, he has received numerous accolades, including two Laurence Olivier Awards, a BAFTA TV Award, and a Writers Guild of America Award , in addition to nominations for three Tony Awards, two Academy Awards, two BAFTA Film Awards, and two Golden Globes.

For his work in film, he wrote the British mystery film Wetherby (1985) for which he won the Golden Bear from the Berlin International Film Festival. He also wrote the drama films Plenty (1985), Damage (1992), and The Secret Rapture (1993). He wrote the screenplay for Stephen Daldry's psychological period drama The Hours (2002) for which he won the Writers Guild of America Award for Best Adapted Screenplay and earned nominations for the Academy Award, the BAFTA Award, and the Golden Globe Award. He reunited with Daldry directing the romantic drama The Reader (2008), for which he was nominated for the Academy Award, BAFTA Award and Golden Globe Award for his Screenplay.

He wrote the screenplay for the Mick Jackson legal drama Denial for which he earned a nomination for the BAFTA Award for Outstanding British Film. For television, he wrote Licking Hitler (1979) which won the British Academy Television Award for Best Single Play. He wrote the BBC Two political thriller Page Eight (2012) for which he was nominated for the BAFTA Award for Best Single Drama.

For his theatrical works he has received eight Laurence Olivier Award nominations for his work on the West End. He won two Laurence Olivier Awards for Best New Play for Racing Demon in 1990 and Skylight in 1996. For his work on the Broadway stage he has received three Tony Award for Best Play nominations for Plenty in 1985, Racing Demon in 1996 and Skylight in 1997. He has also won numerous other theater accolades, including a Drama Desk Award, an Evening Standard Theatre Award, a London Theater Critics' Award, and three New York Drama Critics' Circle.

== Major associations ==
=== Academy Awards ===
Year	Category	Nominated work	Result	Ref.
2002	Best Adapted Screenplay	The Hours	Nominated	
2008	Best Adapted Screenplay	The Reader	Nominated	

=== BAFTA Awards ===
Year	Category	Nominated work	Result	Ref.
British Academy Film Awards
2002	Best Adapted Screenplay	The Hours	Nominated	
2008	Best Adapted Screenplay	The Reader	Nominated	
2016	Outstanding British Film	Denial	Nominated	
British Academy Television Awards
1979	Best Single Play	Play for Today (episode:"Licking Hitler")	Won	
2012	Best Single Drama	Page Eight	Nominated	

=== Golden Globe Awards ===
Year	Category	Nominated work	Result	Ref.
2002	Best Screenplay	The Hours	Nominated	
2008	Best Screenplay	The Reader	Nominated	

=== Laurence Olivier Awards ===
Year	Category	Nominated work	Result	Ref.
1978	Best New Play	Plenty	Nominated	
1985	Best Comedy Play	Pravda	Nominated	
1988	Best New Play	The Secret Rapture	Nominated	
1990	Best New Play	Racing Demon	Won	
1996	Best New Play	Skylight	Won	
1998	Best New Play	Amy's View	Nominated	
1999	Best New Play	The Blue Room	Nominated	
2001	Best New Play	My Zinc Bed	Nominated	

=== Tony Awards ===
Year	Category	Nominated work	Result	Ref.
1983	Best Play	Plenty	Nominated	
1996	Best Play	Racing Demons	Nominated	
1997	Best Play	Skylight	Nominated	

== Miscellaneous awards ==
Organizations	Year	Category	Work	Result	Ref.
Berlin International Film Festival	1985	Golden Bear	Wetherby	Won	
Drama Desk Award	1999	Outstanding One-Person Show	Via Dolorosa	Won	
Evening Standard Award	1995	Best Play	Pravda	Won	
London Theatre Critics' Award	1990	Best Play	Racing Demon	Won	
New York Drama Critics' Circle	1983	Best Foreign Play	Plenty	Won	
New York Drama Critics' Circle	1997	Best Foreign Play	Skylight	Won	
New York Drama Critics' Circle	1999	Special Citation	Amy's View / The Blue Room / Via Dolorosa	Won	

== Honorary awards ==
Organizations	Year	Award	Result	Ref.
Royal Society of Literature	1985	Elected Fellowship (Note: This gave him the Post Nominal Letters "FRSL" for Life.)	Honored	
Queen Elizabeth II	1998	Made a Knight of the Order of the British Empire (Note: "For services to the Theatre". This allows him to use the title Sir.)	Honored	
Jesus College, Cambridge	2001	Awarded Honorary Fellowship	Honored	
University of East Anglia	2010	Awarded the Honorary degree of Doctor of Letters	Honored	
PEN/Pinter Prize	2011	Lifetime Achievement Award	Honored	

== See also ==
- Works of David Hare
- List of British playwrights since 1950
- List of Academy Award winners and nominees from Great Britain
- List of European Academy Award winners and nominees
