= Sara Powell =

British actress (born 1968)

- Born: 23 June 1968 (age 58); Jamaica
- Education: Royal Central School of Speech and Drama; Birmingham University
- Occupations: Actress; narrator
- Years active: 1992–present
- Children: 2

Sara Powell (born 23 June 1968) is a British actress and audiobook narrator. Her regular television roles include crown prosecutor Rachel Barker in the BBC's police procedural drama HolbyBlue (2007–2008), driver Sally Reid in ITV's firefighting drama London's Burning (1993–1994) and psychologist Cass in Channel 4's sitcom Damned (2016–2018).

She also played historical figure Mary Seacole in the thirteenth series of the BBC One long-running science fiction series Doctor Who (2021), as well as a number of other characters in its spin-off audio dramas, produced by Big Finish Productions.

== Early life and education ==
Powell was born on 23 June 1968 in Jamaica. She loved acting from a very young age, making up little shows together with her brother and forcing her father and any guests at home to watch them. Sara studied Commerce (B.Com) at Birmingham University from 1986 to 1989. She studied acting at London's Royal Central School of Speech and Drama.

== Career ==
=== Television ===
Powell's television debut happened in 1992, in an episode of the BAFTA-winning BBC police drama Between the Lines. From 1993 to 1994, she appeared in her first regular role in both the sixth and seventh series of the ITV firefighting drama London's Burning, playing Sally Reid, the watch's first female driver. In 2007, she joined the main cast of the BBC police procedural drama HolbyBlue (2007–2008), playing senior crown prosecutor Rachel Barker throughout the first and second series.

From 2016 to 2018, Powell appeared as psychologist Cass in both series of the Channel 4 sitcom Damned (2016–2018), starring comedians Jo Brand, Alan Davies and Kevin Eldon. Her other television highlights include the ITV crime dramas The Ice Cream Girls (2013), Little Boy Blue (2017) and Unforgotten (2018), comedy thriller You, Me and the Apocalypse (2015), medical drama The Family Man (2006), situation comedy Ghosts (2021) and the film My Zinc Bed (2008), starring Uma Thurman.

"She's just such an inspirational character. I mean, I can't tell you how exciting and what a privilege it is to be able to represent her."

— Powell on portraying Mary Seacole

In 2021, she played historical figure Mary Seacole in the episode "War of the Sontarans" of the BBC's long-running science fiction series Doctor Who, featuring the Thirteenth Doctor, played by Jodie Whittaker. Fans of the classic Doctor Who series, broadcast from 1963 to 1989, may also be familiar with Powell's voice, as she has portrayed more than ten other characters in several Doctor Who audio drama spin-offs from Big Finish Productions, featuring the First, Fourth, Sixth and Seventh Doctors.

=== Stage work ===
Since 1995, she has appeared on stage as often as on television, taking part in about thirty productions at the National Theatre, Bristol Old Vic, Bush Theatre, Donmar Warehouse, Arcola Theatre, Crucible Theatre, Birmingham Rep and more. Powell played various Shakespearean roles, such as Andromache in Troilus and Cressida (1999), Lady Macduff in Macbeth (2005) and Queen Elizabeth in Richard III (2017). Her other classical credits include playing Cariola in John Webster's revenge tragedy The Duchess of Malfi (2000–2001) for the Royal Shakespeare Company's touring production, directed by Gale Edwards. In 2005, Powell starred opposite Friends star David Schwimmer in Neil LaBute's original West End production of Some Girl(s) at the Gielgud Theatre. The cast also included Catherine Tate, Lesley Manville and Saffron Burrows.

In April 2003, Powell made her debut as a theatre director with Come Out Eli, a play based on the events of the Hackney siege, Britain's longest police siege. The play opened at the Tristan Bates Theatre in London only four months after the siege ended. The story was told through recounting interviews taken from eyewitnesses and local residents during the incident. Powell dismissed accusations that the production was exploiting a tragedy, "This [is] not exploitative to me because we are re-telling people's stories. We are not using the stories in any way because we are telling them in the way they told us during the interviews. It is a different method of storytelling to your usual theatre experience. It is technically quite difficult but it does capture the nuances of tone and speech in a very real way."

In 2019, she got a small part in the romantic comedy film Last Christmas, written by Emma Thompson and starring Game of Thrones actress Emilia Clarke. Three years later, Powell joined Clarke in her West End debut, Anton Chekhov's The Seagull, directed by Jamie Lloyd. It was broadcast in cinemas worldwide as part of the National Theatre Live programme, just like Powell's other theatrical production, The Madness of George III (2018), with Mark Gatiss as the lead. Two more plays starring Powell, Mapping the Edge (2001) and Albert Camus's The Plague (2017), have been broadcast on BBC Radio.

== Filmography ==
=== Film ===
Year	Title	Role	Notes	Ref.
1992	The Golden Years	Tecuichpo	Television film	
1994	One Night Stand	Anna	Short film	
1996	The Office	Joan	Television film	
2008	My Zinc Bed	Maxine	Television film	
2016	Denial	Jacqueline Thomas		
2019	Ruth	Ruth	Short film; lead role	
2019	Last Christmas	Casting Director		
2023	The Red Ball	Mother	Short film	
TBA	69	Erica	Short film. Post-production	

=== Television ===
Year	Title	Role	Notes
1992	Between the Lines	School Teacher	Episode: "The Chill Factor"
1993	The Bill	Hostel Girl	Episode: "Rainy Days and Mondays"
1993–1994	London's Burning	Sally Reid	Regular role in series 6–7; 21 episodes
1994	Desmond's	Jwoinika	Episode: "Judgement Day"
1995	Rumble	Georgy	6 episodes
1996	Murder Most Horrid	Staff Nurse Jane	Episode: "A Life or Death Operation"
1996	The Bill	Nina	Episode: "Animal"
1997	Casualty	Justine Leonard	Episodes: "Monday Bloody Monday" & "Perfect Blue"
1998	Vanity Fair	Miss Swartz	Mini-series; episodes 1 & 3
2001	Doctors	Sgt. Susy Martin	Episode: "Stan Loves Cara"
2002	Silent Witness	DS Esther Linden	Episodes: "Tell No Tales: Parts 1 & 2"
2002	Holby City	Louise Whelan	Episode: "Hearts and Minds"
2002	EastEnders	Sheena Brady	1 episode
2002	Doctors	WPC	Episode: "Bottled"
2003	Dinotopia	Intern #1	Episodes: "The Cure: Part 2" & "Crossroads"
2004	Doctors	Venetta Warner	Episode: "A Recipe for Disaster"
2005	Judge John Deed	Kerry Ramsay	Episode: "Lost and Found"
2006	The Family Man	Jane	Main role; 3 episodes
2007	The Whistleblowers	Pam James	Episode: "No Child Left Behind"
2007–2008	HolbyBlue	Rachel Barker	Main role in series 1–2; 16 episodes
2009	The Bill	Miriam Sissoulu	3 episodes
2009	Doctors	Sandra Johnson	Episode: "Ladies Man"
2010–2011	Florrie's Dragons	Splish-Splash (voice)	52 episodes
2011	Sadie J	Traci	Episodes: "Girltastic: Parts 1 & 2"
2011	Law & Order: UK	Annetta Trew	Episode: "Deal"
2012	Public Enemies	Dawn Clough	Mini-series; episode 3
2012	Casualty	Kerry Fitzgerald	Episode: "Confidences"
2012	Doctors	Deanna Ryan	Episode: "A Bracing Walk"
2013	The Ice Cream Girls	Fez Gorringe	Mini-series; all 3 episodes
2013	Love and Marriage	Emma	Episode: "The Elephant in the Room"
2014	DCI Banks	Head Teacher	Episode: "Wednesday's Child: Part 1"
2014	Holby City	Rebecca Farnum	Episode: "One Small Step"
2015	You, Me and the Apocalypse	Naomi	Mini-series; 3 episodes
2016–2018	Damned	Cass	8 episodes
2017	Midsomer Murders	Maxine Lockston	Episode: "Crime and Punishment"
2017	Little Boy Blue	ACC Pat Gallan	Mini-series; all 4 episodes
2018	Silent Witness	Tilly Maddox	Episodes: "One Day: Parts 1 & 2"
2018	Unforgotten	Arbiter	3 episodes
2019	Death in Paradise	Josephine Porter	Episode: "Frappe Death Day"
2021	Ghosts	Jacqui	Episode: "I Love Lucy"
2021	Doctor Who	Mary Seacole	Episode: "War of the Sontarans"
2022	Murder in Provence	Cosette Faraud	Episode: #1.2
2022	The House Across the Street	Joanne	Mini-series; all 4 episodes
2023	The Killing Kind	Belinda Grey	5 episodes
2023	Vera	Katherine Willmore	Episode: "The Rising Tide"
2024	Too Good to Be True	Simone	4 episodes
2024	Dalgliesh	Paula Rice	Episode: "Cover Her Face: Part 1"
2025	In the Room	Kathy Macintyre	Mini-series; 4 episodes
2025	Lynley	Reverend Ulrike Karlsson	Episode: "With No One as a Witness"

=== Audio ===
==== Full-cast audio dramas ====
Year	Title	Role	Production	Notes
2014	Blake's 7	Dr. Cara Petrus	Big Finish Productions	Episode: "Drones"
2014	The Early Adventures	Audrey Newman	Big Finish Productions	Episode: "An Ordinary Life"
2015	Pathfinder Legends	Deka-An-Keret / Zizzira	Big Finish Productions	Episode: "Shifting Sands"
2016	The Diary of River Song	The PA	Big Finish Productions	Episode: "World Enough and Time"
2016–2017	The Prisoner	Number 9 / Number 90	Big Finish Productions	Series 1–2
2017	Blake's 7	Rokon	Big Finish Productions	Episode: "Liberation"
2018	The Early Adventures	Jacklyn Karna	Big Finish Productions	Episode: "The Dalek Occupation of Winter"
2018	The Seventh Doctor: The New Adventures	Contessa	Big Finish Productions	Episode: "Vanguard"
2021	The Fourth Doctor Adventures	Emma Fremantle	Big Finish Productions	Episode: "The World Traders"
2021	Torchwood	Mo Simister	Big Finish Productions	Episode: "The Five People You Kill in Middlesbrough"
2021	Jenny: The Doctor's Daughter	Andros Fax / Bar Person	Big Finish Productions	Episode: "Inside the Maldovarium"
2022	Peladon	Queen Minaris	Big Finish Productions	Episode: "The Death of Peladon"
2022	The War Master	Blythe / Confederation Official	Big Finish Productions	2 episodes
2023	The Fourth Doctor Adventures	Moira Tenaka	Big Finish Productions	Episode: "The Wizard of Time"

==== Audiobook narration ====
- The Cellar (2015) by Minette Walters
- When I Was Invisible (2016) by Dorothy Koomson
- All Men Want to Know (2020) by Nina Bouraoui, translated by Aneesa Abbas Higgins
- Bernard and the Cloth Monkey (2021) by Judith Bryan
- The Sex Lives of African Women (2021) by Nana Darkoa Sekyiamah
- Citizens: A Chronicle of the French Revolution (2021) by Simon Schama
- Assassin's Orbit (2021) by John Appel
- Sankofa (2021) by Chibundu Onuzo
- Island Songs (2021) by Alex Wheatle
- What Is History, Now? (2021) by Helen Carr and Suzannah Lipscomb
- In Every Mirror She's Black (2021) by Lola Akinmade Åkerström
- Evelyn Dove: Britain's Black Cabaret Queen (2022) by Stephen Bourne
- The Wordhord (2022) by Hana Videen
- Blood to Poison (2022) by Mary Watson
- The Blunder (2022) by Mutt-Lon, translated by Amy B. Reid
- The Racial Code: Tales of Resistance and Survival (2022) by Nicola Rollock
- The Day I Fell Off My Island (2022) by Yvonne Bailey-Smith

=== Video games ===
- The Secret World (2012)
- Dragon Age: Inquisition (2014)
- Dragon Age: Inquisition – Trespasser (2015)
- Red Solstice 2: Survivors (2021)
- Dying Light 2: Stay Human (2022)

== Theatre ==
Year	Title	Role	Venue	Ref.
1995	The House of Bernarda Alba	Magdalena	The Brix Theatre	
1995	Our Country's Good	Dabby	Theatr Clwyd	
1996	Golden Girls	Dorcas Ableman	Mercury Theatre	
1998	The Basset Table	Lady Lucy	Bristol Old Vic	
1999	Troilus and Cressida	Andromache	National Theatre	
1999	The Darker Face of the Earth	Scylla	National Theatre	
1999–2000	Honk! The Ugly Duckling	Maureen	National Theatre	
2000	The Villain's Opera	Mardelle	National Theatre	
2000–2001	The Duchess of Malfi	Cariola	Royal Shakespeare Company	
2001	Mapping the Edge	Nadia	Crucible Theatre	
2003	Racing Demon	Stella Marr	Birmingham Repertory Theatre	
2003	Murmuring Judges	Irina Platt	Birmingham Repertory Theatre	
2003	The Absence of War	Mary Housego	Birmingham Repertory Theatre	
2003–2004	World Music	Paulette Jones	Crucible Theatre / Donmar Warehouse	
2004	Stuff Happens	Foreign Office official	National Theatre	
2005	Macbeth	Lady Macduff	Almeida Theatre	
2005	Some Girl(s)	Tyler	Gielgud Theatre	
2011	A Walk On Part	Actress	Soho Theatre	
2013	Disgraced	Jory	Bush Theatre	
2015	The Crucible	Tituba	Bristol Old Vic	
2017	Richard III	Queen Elizabeth	Arcola Theatre	
2017	The Plague	Dr. Rieux	Arcola Theatre	
2018	The Madness of George III	Lady Pembroke	Nottingham Playhouse	
2019	Keith?	Veena	Arcola Theatre	
2019	Cyrano	Roxane	Bristol Old Vic	
2021–2022	Vanya and Sonia and Masha and Spike	Cassandra	Charing Cross Theatre	
2022	The Seagull	Polina Andryevna	Harold Pinter Theatre	
