= 2001 Laurence Olivier Awards =

Edition of London theatre awards

- Location: Lyceum Theatre, London
- Most wins: All My Sons (4)
- Most nominations: All My Sons (6)

The 2001 Laurence Olivier Awards were presented by the Society of London Theatre in 2001 at the Lyceum Theatre, London, celebrating excellence in West End theatre.

== Winners and nominees ==
Details of winners (in bold) and nominees, in each award category, per the Society of London Theatre.

Best New Play	Best New Musical
**Blue/Orange by Joe Penhall – National Theatre Cottesloe**; Dolly West's Kitchen by Frank McGuinness – Old Vic; Life x 3 by Yasmina Reza – National Theatre Lyttelton; My Zinc Bed by David Hare – Royal Court	**Merrily We Roll Along – Donmar Warehouse**; Fosse – Prince of Wales; The Beautiful Game – Cambridge; The Witches of Eastwick – Theatre Royal Drury Lane
Best New Comedy	Outstanding Musical Production
**Stones in His Pockets by Marie Jones – Duke of York's**; Cooking with Elvis by Lee Hall – Whitehall; House/Garden by Alan Ayckbourn – National Theatre Lyttelton / Olivier; Peggy for You by Alan Plater – Comedy	**Singin' in the Rain – National Theatre Olivier**; H.M.S. Pinafore – Savoy; The King and I – London Palladium; The Mikado – Savoy; The Pirates of Penzance – Regent's Park Open Air
Best Actor	Best Actress
**Conleth Hill as Charlie Conlon in Stones in His Pockets – New Ambassadors / Duke of York's**; Simon Russell Beale as Prince Hamlet in Hamlet – National Theatre Lyttelton; Sean Campion as Jake Quinn in Stones in His Pockets – New Ambassadors / Duke of York's; Michael Gambon as Davies in The Caretaker – Comedy; Bill Nighy as Dr. Robert Smith in Blue/Orange – National Theatre Cottesloe	**Julie Walters as Kate Keller in All My Sons – National Theatre Cottesloe**; Jessica Lange as Mary Tyrone in Long Day's Journey into Night – Lyric; Helen Mirren as Lady Torrance in Orpheus Descending – Donmar Warehouse; Julia Ormond as Elsa in My Zinc Bed – Royal Court; Harriet Walter as Sonia in Life x 3 – National Theatre Lyttelton
Best Actor in a Musical	Best Actress in a Musical
**Daniel Evans as Charley Kringas in Merrily We Roll Along – Donmar Warehouse**; Jimmy Johnston as The Pirate King in The Pirates of Penzance – Regent's Park Open Air; Paul Robinson as Don Lockwood in Singin' in the Rain – National Theatre Olivier; David Shannon as John Kelly in The Beautiful Game – Cambridge	**Samantha Spiro as Mary Flynn in Merrily We Roll Along – Donmar Warehouse**; Nicola Hughes as Performer in Fosse – Prince of Wales; Joanna Riding as Jane Smart in The Witches of Eastwick – Theatre Royal Drury Lane; Josie Walker as Mary in The Beautiful Game – Cambridge
Best Actor in a Supporting Role	Best Actress in a Supporting Role
**Ben Daniels as Chris Keller in All My Sons – National Theatre Cottesloe**; Chiwetel Ejiofor as Christopher in Blue/Orange – National Theatre Cottesloe; Douglas Hodge as Aston in The Caretaker – Comedy; Jason Watkins as Truffaldino in A Servant to Two Masters – Young Vic / New Ambassadors	**Pauline Flanagan as Rima West in Dolly West's Kitchen – Old Vic**; Gillian Barge as Agnes in Passion Play – Donmar Warehouse; Catherine McCormack as Ann Deever in All My Sons – National Theatre Cottesloe; Marcia Warren as Annie/Gramma in In Flame – New Ambassadors
Best Supporting Performance in a Musical
**Miles Western as Miss West Coast in Pageant – Vaudeville**; Rosemary Ashe Felicia Gabriel in The Witches of Eastwick – Theatre Royal Drury Lane; Rebecca Thornhill as Lina Lamont in Singin' in the Rain – National Theatre Olivier; Taewon Yi Kim as Lady Thiang in The King and I – London Palladium
Best Director	Best Theatre Choreographer
**Howard Davies for All My Sons – National Theatre Cottesloe**; Michael Grandage for Passion Play – Donmar Warehouse; Nicholas Hytner for Orpheus Descending – Donmar Warehouse; Trevor Nunn for The Cherry Orchard – National Theatre Cottesloe / Olivier; Ian Talbot for The Pirates of Penzance – Regent's Park Open Air	**Bob Fosse and Ann Reinking for Fosse – Prince of Wales**; Peter Darling for Merrily We Roll Along – Donmar Warehouse; Stephen Mear for Singin' in the Rain – National Theatre Olivier; Meryl Tankard for The Beautiful Game – Cambridge
Best Set Designer	Best Costume Designer
**William Dudley for All My Sons – National Theatre Cottesloe**; Bunny Christie for Baby Doll – National Theatre Lyttelton / Albery; Rob Howell for The Caretaker – Comedy; Brian Thomson for The King and I – London Palladium	**Alison Chitty for Remembrance of Things Past – National Theatre Cottesloe**; Gregg Barnes for Pageant – Vaudeville; Bob Crowley for Cressida – Albery and The Witches of Eastwick – Theatre Royal Drury Lane; Roger Kirk for The King and I – London Palladium
Best Lighting Designer
**Hugh Vanstone for The Cherry Orchard – National Theatre Cottesloe and The Graduate – Gielgud**; Howard Harrison for The Witches of Eastwick – Theatre Royal Drury Lane and To the Green Fields Beyond – Donmar Warehouse; Mark Henderson for All My Sons – National Theatre Cottesloe; Paul Pyant for Hamlet – National Theatre Lyttelton
Outstanding Achievement in Dance	Best New Dance Production
**Deborah Colker for choreographing Mix – Barbican**; Matthew Bourne for conceiving and dramatisating The Car Man – Old Vic; Robert Parker in Shakespeare Suite, Birmingham Royal Ballet – Royal Opera House; Michael Revie in Mozartina, Zürich Ballet – Sadler's Wells	**Le Jardin Io Io Ito Ito, Compagnie Montalvo-Hervieu – Barbican**; Indigo Rose, Nederlands Dans Theater 2 – Sadler's Wells; Mellantid, Nederlands Dans Theater 2 – Sadler's Wells; Mozartina, Zürich Ballet – Sadler's Wells
Outstanding Achievement in Opera	Outstanding New Opera Production
**Amanda Holden and Mark-Anthony Turnage for creating The Silver Tassie – National Theatre Lyttelton**; Gerald Finley in The Silver Tassie, English National Opera – National Theatre Lyttelton; Kirov Opera for their season – Royal Opera House; Stefanos Lazaridis for set designing The Greek Passion and the Italian season, English National Opera – London Coliseum	**The Greek Passion, The Royal Opera – Royal Opera House**; Pelléas and Mélisande, English National Opera – London Coliseum; The Coronation of Poppea, English National Opera – London Coliseum; War and Peace, Kirov Opera – Royal Opera House

== Productions with multiple nominations and awards ==
The following 22 productions, including one ballet and two operas, received multiple nominations:

- 6: All My Sons
- 5: The Witches of Eastwick
- 4: Merrily We Roll Along, Singin' in the Rain, The Beautiful Game and The King and I
- 3: Blue/Orange, Fosse, Stones in His Pockets, The Caretaker and The Pirates of Penzance
- 2: Dolly West's Kitchen, Hamlet, Life x 3, Mozartina, My Zinc Bed, Orpheus Descending, Pageant, Passion Play, The Cherry Orchard, The Greek Passion and The Silver Tassie

The following three productions received multiple awards:

- 4: All My Sons
- 3: Merrily We Roll Along
- 2: Stones in His Pockets

== See also ==
- 55th Tony Awards
