= My Zinc Bed =

My Zinc Bed may refer to:

- My Zinc Bed (play), stage play by David Hare, premiered in 2000
- My Zinc Bed (film), 2008 TV film adaptation of the play
