= 37th Tony Awards =

1983 US theatrical awards ceremony

- Date: June 5, 1983
- Location: Gershwin Theatre, New York City, New York
- Hosted by: Richard Burton, Lena Horne, and Jack Lemmon
- Most wins: Cats (7)
- Most nominations: Cats (11)

Television/radio coverage
- Network: CBS

The 37th Annual Tony Awards was held at the Gershwin Theatre on June 5, 1983, and broadcast by CBS television. Hosts were Richard Burton, Lena Horne, and Jack Lemmon.

== Eligibility ==
Shows that opened on Broadway during the 1982–1983 season before May 16, 1983 are eligible.

Original plays

- Almost an Eagle
- Angels Fall
- Beyond Therapy
- Brighton Beach Memoirs
- 84, Charing Cross Road
- Foxfire
- Good
- K2
- A Little Family Business
- The Man Who Had Three Arms
- Monday After the Miracle
- Moose Murders
- A Need for Brussels Sprouts
- A Need for Less Expertise
- 'night, Mother
- Passion
- Plenty
- The Queen and the Rebels
- The Slab Boys Trilogy
- Steaming
- Teaneck Tanzi
- Torch Song Trilogy
- Total Abandon
- The Wake of Jamey Foster
- Whodunnit

Original musicals

- Blues in the Night
- Cats
- Cleavage
- Dance a Little Closer
- Do Black Patent Leather Shoes Really Reflect Up?
- A Doll's Life
- Merlin
- My One and Only
- Play Me a Country Song
- Rock 'N Roll! The First 5,000 Years
- Seven Brides for Seven Brothers

Play revivals

- Alice in Wonderland
- All's Well That Ends Well
- The Caine Mutiny Court-Martial
- Ghosts
- The Misanthrope
- Present Laughter
- Private Lives
- The Ritz
- A View from the Bridge
- You Can't Take It with You

Musical revivals

- On Your Toes
- Porgy and Bess
- Show Boat
- Your Arms Too Short to Box with God

== The ceremony ==
Presenters included George Abbott, Diahann Carroll, David Cassidy, James Coco, Cleavant Derricks, Colleen Dewhurst, Sergio Franchi, Bonnie Franklin, Peter Michael Goetz, Mark Hamill, Cheryl Hartley, Florence Lacey, Frank Langella, Court Miller, Liliane Montevecchi, Jerry Orbach, Jay Patterson, John Rubinstein, and Pamela Sousa.

The Special Salute was a medley of George Gershwin songs. At the end of the ceremony the Uris Theatre was renamed the Gershwin Theatre. Songs included: "The Real American Folk Song" sung by Diahann Carroll, "Stairway to Paradise" sung by Ben Vereen, "Somebody Loves Me" sung by Jack Lemmon and Ginger Rogers, "Lady Be Good" sung by Hal Linden and Ginger Rogers, "Someone to Watch Over Me" sung by Melissa Manchester, "How Long Has This Been Going On?" sung by Bonnie Franklin, "Vodka" sung by Dorothy Loudon, "I Got Rhythm" sung by Michele Lee and "There's a Boat dat's Leavin' Soon For New York" sung by Robert Guillaume.

Musicals represented:

- Cats, "Jellicle Songs for Jellicle Cats" - Company/"Memory" - Betty Buckley
- Merlin, "It's About Magic" - Doug Henning, Company
- My One and Only, "Kicking the Clouds Away" - Tommy Tune, Company

During his acceptance speech, Torch Song Trilogy producer John Glines thanked his partner and lover, Lawrence Lane, in a statement widely thought to be the first open acknowledgement of a gay partner at a major awards show.

== Winners and nominees ==
Source: BroadwayWorld

Winners are in bold

Best Play	Best Musical
**Torch Song Trilogy – Harvey Fierstein**; Angels Fall – Lanford Wilson; 'night, Mother – Marsha Norman; Plenty – David Hare	**Cats**; Blues in the Night; Merlin; My One and Only
Best Revival	Best Book of a Musical
**On Your Toes**; All's Well That Ends Well; A View from the Bridge; The Caine Mutiny Court-Martial	**T.S. Eliot – Cats**; Betty Comden and Adolph Green – A Doll's Life; Richard Levinson and William Link – Merlin; Peter Stone and Timothy S. Mayer – My One and Only
Best Performance by a Leading Actor in a Play	Best Performance by a Leading Actress in a Play
**Harvey Fierstein – Torch Song Trilogy as Arnold Beckoff**; Jeffrey DeMunn – K2 as Taylor; Edward Herrmann – Plenty as Raymond Brock; Tony Lo Bianco – A View from the Bridge as Eddie	**Jessica Tandy – Foxfire as Annie Nations**; Kathy Bates – 'night, Mother as Jessie Cates; Kate Nelligan – Plenty as Susan Traherne; Anne Pitoniak – 'night, Mother as Thelma Cates
Best Performance by a Leading Actor in a Musical	Best Performance by a Leading Actress in a Musical
**Tommy Tune – My One and Only as Cpt. Billy Buck Chandler**; Al Green – Your Arms Too Short to Box with God as Performer; George Hearn – A Doll's Life as Various Characters; Michael V. Smartt – Porgy and Bess as Porgy	**Natalia Makarova – On Your Toes as Vera Barnova**; Lonette McKee – Show Boat as Julie La Verne; Chita Rivera – Merlin as The Queen; Twiggy – My One and Only as Edith Herbert
Best Performance by a Featured Actor in a Play	Best Performance by a Featured Actress in a Play
**Matthew Broderick – Brighton Beach Memoirs as Eugene Jerome**; Željko Ivanek – Brighton Beach Memoirs as Stanley Jerome; George N. Martin – Plenty as Leonard Darwin; Stephen Moore – All's Well That Ends Well as Captain Parolles	**Judith Ivey – Steaming as Josie**; Elizabeth Franz – Brighton Beach Memoirs as Kate Jerome; Roxanne Hart – Passion as Kate; Margaret Tyzack – All's Well That Ends Well as The Countess of Rossillion
Best Performance by a Featured Actor in a Musical	Best Performance by a Featured Actress in a Musical
**Charles "Honi" Coles – My One and Only as Mr. Magix**; Harry Groener – Cats as Munkustrap; Stephen Hanan – Cats as Bustopher Jones / Asparagus / Growltiger; Lara Teeter – On Your Toes as Junior	**Betty Buckley – Cats as Grizabella**; Christine Andreas – On Your Toes as Frankie Frayne; Karla Burns – Show Boat as Queenie; Denny Dillon – My One and Only as Mickey
Best Original Score (Music and/or Lyrics) Written for the Theatre	Best Choreography
**Cats – Andrew Lloyd Webber (music) and T.S. Eliot (lyrics)**; A Doll's Life – Larry Grossman (music) and Betty Comden and Adolph Green (lyrics); Merlin – Elmer Bernstein (music) and Don Black (lyrics); Seven Brides for Seven Brothers – Gene de Paul, Al Kasha and Joel Hirschhorn (music) and Johnny Mercer, Kasha and Hirschhorn (lyrics)	**Thommie Walsh and Tommy Tune – My One and Only**; George Faison – Porgy and Bess; Gillian Lynne – Cats; Donald Saddler – On Your Toes
Best Direction of a Play	Best Direction of a Musical
**Gene Saks – Brighton Beach Memoirs**; Marshall W. Mason – Angels Fall; Tom Moore – 'night, Mother; Trevor Nunn – All's Well That Ends Well	**Trevor Nunn – Cats**; Michael Kahn – Show Boat; Ivan Reitman – Merlin; Tommy Tune and Thommie Walsh – My One and Only
Best Scenic Design	Best Costume Design
**Ming Cho Lee – K2**; John Gunter – All's Well That Ends Well; David Mitchell – Foxfire; John Napier – Cats	**John Napier – Cats**; Lindy Hemming – All's Well That Ends Well; Rita Ryack – My One and Only; Patricia Zipprodt – Alice in Wonderland
Best Lighting Design
**David Hersey – Cats**; Ken Billington – Foxfire; Robert & Beverly Bryan – All's Well That Ends Well; Allen Lee Hughes – K2

== Special awards ==
- Regional Theatre Award - Oregon Shakespeare Festival Association

=== Multiple nominations and awards ===
These productions received multiple nominations:

- 11 nominations: Cats
- 9 nominations: My One and Only
- 7 nominations: All's Well That Ends Well
- 5 nominations: Merlin and On Your Toes
- 4 nominations: Brighton Beach Memoirs, 'night, Mother and Plenty
- 3 nominations: A Doll's Life, Foxfire, K2 and Show Boat
- 2 nominations: Angels Fall, Porgy and Bess, Torch Song Trilogy and A View from the Bridge

The following productions received multiple awards.

- 7 wins: Cats
- 3 wins: My One and Only
- 2 wins: Brighton Beach Memoirs, On Your Toes and Torch Song Trilogy

== See also ==
- Drama Desk Awards
- 1983 Laurence Olivier Awards – equivalent awards for West End theatre productions
- Obie Award
- New York Drama Critics' Circle
- Theatre World Award
- Lucille Lortel Awards
