= Rachel Barker =

Rachel Barker may refer to:

- Rachel Barker, fictional character in HolbyBlue, played by Sara Powell
- Rachel Barker, Miss New Hampshire 2007
