= Wall (play) =

2009 play by David Hare

Wall is a 2009 play by David Hare, in the form of a monologue. It was first performed in March 2009 at the Jerwood Theatre Downstairs at the Royal Court Theatre by the author himself, directed by Stephen Daldry. Its topic is the Israeli Security Barriers in the West Bank and Gaza and it is intended by Hare as a companion piece to his monologue Berlin and its passages on the Berlin Wall. Both monologues were later performed together as Berlin/Wall at The Public Theater, Broadway in May 2009.

Hare read the monologue on BBC Radio 4 in May 2009.

The monologue was adapted into Wall, an animated documentary by director Cam Christiansen, which premiered in 2017.
