= Damned (TV series) =

British comedy series

- Genre: Comedy drama
- Created by: Jo Brand; Morwenna Banks
- Written by: Jo Brand; Morwenna Banks; Will Smith
- Directed by: Natalie Bailey; Ian Fitzgibbon
- Starring: Jo Brand; Alan Davies; Kevin Eldon; Himesh Patel; Isy Suttie; Georgie Glen; Morwenna Banks
- Country of origin: United Kingdom
- Original language: English
- No. of series: 2
- No. of episodes: 13 (12 + pilot)

Production
- Producer: Claire Whalley
- Editor: Dan Robinson
- Running time: 4 hours 6 minutes
- Production company: What Larks Productions

Original release
- Network: Sky Arts
- Release: 12 June 2014
- Network: Channel 4
- Release: 27 September 2016 – 21 March 2018

Damned is a British television sitcom shown on Channel 4, premiering on 27 September 2016. Created by and starring Jo Brand, the series is set in the office of the children's services department of fictional Elm Heath Council.

== Production ==
In March 2014, Sky Arts announced that it was reprising its Playhouse Presents series of self-contained television plays. Jo Brand and Morwenna Banks penned a script for what was hoped to be a pilot episode. Sky Arts aired the episode but never commissioned it to series; so Brand, Banks, and comedy writer Will Smith re-developed it for Channel 4, who announced its commission in May 2016.

== Broadcast ==
The first series premiered on Channel 4 on 27 September 2016, and concluded on 1 November 2016. In February 2017, Channel 4 commissioned a second six-episode series. Series 2 began broadcasting on 14 February 2018. Episode 5 of the second series was not aired as planned on 14 March 2018 to make space for a tribute to Professor Stephen Hawking, who had died a day earlier. The episode was then aired a week later on 21 March 2018 as a double feature alongside the sixth and final episode of the second series.

== Cast and characters ==
- Rose Denby (Jo Brand) – Series 1–2 – Senior Social Worker
- Alastair (Al) Kavanagh (Alan Davies) – Series 1–2 – Senior Social Worker
- Martin Bickerstaff (Kevin Eldon) – Series 1–2 – Senior Social Worker then Team Leader, former banker, on medical leave throughout series 1.
- Denise (Georgie Glen) – Series 1–2 – Cluster Manager.
- Nitin (Himesh Patel) – Series 1–2 – Social Worker, former Metropolitan Police Service constable.
- Natalie (Nat) (Isy Suttie) – Series 1–2 – Executive Assistant from a temp agency.
- Ingrid (Morwenna Banks) – Series 1–2 – Senior Social Worker, foster carer, on medical leave throughout series 1.
- Mimi (Lolly Adefope) – 2 – Student Social Worker on placement.
- Cass (Sara Powell) – Series 1–2 – Psychologist.

== Episodes ==
Series	Episodes	Originally released	
Series	Episodes	First released	Last released
1	6	27 September 2016	1 November 2016
2	6	14 February 2018	21 March 2018

=== Pilot (2014) ===
No.	Title	Directed by	Written by	Original release date	UK viewers (millions)
—	"Pilot"	Natalie Bailey	Morwenna Banks & Jo Brand	12 June 2014	N/A

=== Series 1 (2016) ===
No. overall	No. in season	Title	Directed by	Written by	Original release date	UK viewers (millions)
1	1	"Episode 1"	Ian FitzGibbon	Morwenna Banks, Jo Brand, & Will Smith	27 September 2016	1.89
2	2	"Episode 2"	Ian FitzGibbon	Morwenna Banks, Jo Brand, & Will Smith	4 October 2016	1.37
3	3	"Episode 3"	Ian FitzGibbon	Morwenna Banks, Jo Brand, & Will Smith	11 October 2016	1.08
4	4	"Episode 4"	Ian FitzGibbon	Morwenna Banks, Jo Brand, & Will Smith	18 October 2016	1.07
5	5	"Episode 5"	Ian FitzGibbon	Morwenna Banks, Jo Brand, & Will Smith	25 October 2016	N/A
6	6	"Episode 6"	Ian FitzGibbon	Morwenna Banks, Jo Brand, & Will Smith	1 November 2016	N/A

=== Series 2 (2018) ===
No. overall	No. in season	Title	Directed by	Written by	Original release date	UK viewers (millions)
7	1	"Episode 1"	Natalie Bailey	Morwenna Banks, Jo Brand, & Will Smith	14 February 2018	N/A
8	2	"Episode 2"	Natalie Bailey	Morwenna Banks, Jo Brand, & Will Smith	21 February 2018	N/A
9	3	"Episode 3"	Natalie Bailey	Morwenna Banks, Jo Brand, & Will Smith	28 February 2018	N/A
10	4	"Episode 4"	Natalie Bailey	Morwenna Banks, Jo Brand, & Will Smith	7 March 2018	N/A
11	5	"Episode 5"	Natalie Bailey	Morwenna Banks, Jo Brand, & Will Smith	21 March 2018	N/A
12	6	"Episode 6"	Natalie Bailey	Morwenna Banks, Jo Brand, & Will Smith	21 March 2018	N/A
