= The Family Man (British TV series) =

- Genre: Medical drama
- Written by: Tony Marchant
- Directed by: John Strickland
- Starring: Trevor Eve; Michelle Collins; Peter McDonald; Lennie James; Sara Powell; Claire Skinner; Dominic Rowan; Katy Kavanagh; Lee Ross; Daniela Denby-Ashe
- Composer: Nick Bicât
- Country of origin: United Kingdom
- Original language: English
- No. of series: 1
- No. of episodes: 3

Production
- Executive producer: Sally Haynes
- Producer: Sarah Brown
- Running time: 1 hour
- Production company: BBC Productions

Original release
- Network: BBC One
- Release: 23 March – 6 April 2006

The Family Man is a medical drama in three parts that aired on BBC One from 23 March to 6 April 2006, centered on the successful (fictional) Wishart Fertility Clinic which has recently celebrated its 2000th live birth. The patriarch of the clinic is Dr Patrick Stowe (played by Trevor Eve). The drama follows four couples facing a spectrum of fertility problems.
