= Montauk (play) =

2027 play by David Hare

- Original language: English
- Written by: David Hare

Premiere
- Place: Samuel J. Friedman Theatre
- Directed by: Jonathan Kent

Montauk is a play by English playwright David Hare. It is expected to receive its world premiere in Spring 2027 at the Samuel J. Friedman Theatre on Broadway.

== Plot synopsis ==
Roxy Margeaux, an author, falls in love with a painter, Jared Speight, over the span of a decade.

== Production history ==
In 2025, Playbill magazine published a report that Montauk would be produced by Scott Rudin, would star Laurie Metcalf, and would be directed by Joe Mantello. However, in 2026 it was announced that the play would instead be produced by Manhattan Theatre Club with no mention of Rudin, Metcalf, or Mantello.

Montauk will premiere on Broadway at the Samuel J. Friedman Theatre in the spring of 2027 as part of Manhattan Theatre Club's 2026–2027 season. It was to have been directed by Daniel J. Sullivan and will star Laura Linney as Roxy Margeaux. After Sullivan announced his retirement in 2026, Jonathan Kent replaced him as Montauk's director.
