= K2 (play) =

1982 American survival-drama play by Patrick Meyers

- Written by: Patrick Meyers
- Setting: A mountain ledge

Premiere
- Date premiered: April 23, 1982; 44 years ago
- Place premiered: Arena Stage, Washington, D.C.

K2 is a play by Patrick Meyers. It tells the story of two mountain climbers who find themselves trapped on a ledge on K2, the second-highest mountain in the world. The play premiered at the Arena Stage in Washington, D.C. in April 1982.

== Synopsis ==
K2 is a one-act two-man play. It centers on mountain climbers Harold and Taylor, who find themselves trapped 27,000 feet (8,200 m) above sea level on a ledge on the side of K2, the second-highest mountain in the world.

== Production history ==
K2 first ran at the Arena Stage's Kreeger Theater from April 23 to June 6, 1982. The production was directed by Jacques Levy and starred Stephen McHattie and Stanley Anderson. It received rave reviews from The New York Times and The Washington Post, particularly for Ming Cho Lee's hyper-realistic set design. Lee used over 50,000 board feet of styrofoam to build a set that simulated a massive icy mountainside.

The play opened at the Brooks Atkinson Theatre on Broadway on March 30, 1983. This production was directed by Terry Schreiber and starred Jeffrey DeMunn and Jay Patterson. It closed on June 11, 1983, after 10 previews and 85 regular performances. K2 received three nominations at the 37th Tony Awards, winning Best Scenic Design for Lee's set.

From December 15, 2000, to January 28, 2001, the play was revived at the Arena Stage. Wendy C. Goldberg directed the revival which starred Rick Holmes and Craig Wallace. K2 has also been staged by other regional theaters, such as by the Virginia Stage Company at the Wells Theatre in 2014.

== Film adaptation ==
The play was adapted into a film of the same name in 1992.
