= Wall (2017 film) =

- Film poster
- Directed by: Cam Christiansen
- Written by: David Hare
- Produced by: David Christensen; Bonnie Thompson
- Music by: James Mark Stewart
- Animation by: Mitch Barany; Price Morgan; Cam Christiansen; Sergey Solokhin; William Dyer; Niranjan Kailainathan; Deepak Kumar; Tyler Lemermeyer; Gregory Marshall; Joe Sie
- Production company: National Film Board of Canada
- Release date: September 25, 2017 (CIFF)
- Running time: 82 minutes
- Country: Canada
- Language: English

Wall is a Canadian animated documentary film, directed by Cam Christiansen and released in 2017. Based on David Hare's theatrical monologue Wall, the film is a reflection on the Israeli West Bank barrier and its effects on peace in the Middle East.

The film was originally announced in 2011 for a planned release in 2014, but it was delayed and instead premiered at the 2017 Calgary International Film Festival. It screened at the 2018 Annecy International Animation Film Festival, in competition for the Cristal for best feature film, and was commercially released to Canadian theatres in 2018.

In 2019 the film received a new screening in Calgary, alongside a talk about the Israeli-Palestinian border wall by writer Marcello Di Cintio.
