= To the Green Fields Beyond (play) =

To the Green Fields Beyond is a 2000 play by Nick Whitby, dealing with the experiences of a tank crew in 1918 during the First World War. It takes its title from the unofficial motto of the Royal Tank Regiment From Mud, through Blood, to the Green Fields Beyond. It premiered at the Donmar Warehouse in 2000, directed by Sam Mendes and with a cast including Dougray Scott, Adrian Scarborough and Ray Winstone.
