= Via Dolorosa (play) =

1998 British play

- Original language: English
- Written by: David Hare
- Subject: Israeli–Palestinian conflict
- Genre: Monologue

Premiere
- Date: 1998
- Place: London, England

Via Dolorosa is a play by British dramatist David Hare, in the form of a monologue. It deals with the Israeli–Palestinian conflict through Hare's own 1997 journey through Israel and Palestine, and the 33 people whom he met.

Hare travelled to Israel and Palestine at the request of Elyse Dodgson, for the International Department of the Royal Court Theatre, as part of a proposed project for three playwrights, one British, one Israeli and one Palestinian, to write three plays on the British Mandate. However, on his return he proposed to the director Stephen Daldry that he wanted to write a monologue on his experiences.

Hare premiered the work in London in September 1998, in his solo acting debut, in collaboration with Daldry and set designer Ian McNeil. The first US performance was on 18 March 1999, again with Daldry as director. Excerpts of the play were released on CD. The work was later produced for television. Hare performed the work again in July 2002 at the Duchess Theatre, London.

In the context of this play, Daldry has characterized Hare's attitude to the Israel–Palestine conflict as follows:

What David Hare is unneutral about—what he's deeply against—is extremism. Here it's the extremism he found, and brilliantly acts out, between warring political-philosophical-religious diehards within each populace, Israeli and Palestinian alike—'people who seek religious justification for excessive behavior on either side.'

Hare received the 1999 Drama Desk Award for Outstanding Solo Performance for his performance of Via Dolorosa.

In May 1999, Steven Greenstein filed a US civil complaint against the Royal Court Theatre that alleged that Via Dolorosa had unlawfully taken ideas for the text and structure from an unproduced play by Greenstein, Voices from the Holy...and Not So Holy Land. The lawsuit did not name Hare specifically. In April 2000, Judge Denny Chin of the Federal District Court in Manhattan dismissed the lawsuit and asserted that the plays by Greenstein and Hare were separate entities.
