= Beat the Devil (play) =

2020 play by David Hare

Beat the Devil is a 2020 monologue play by the British playwright David Hare. It is based on Hare's experience of catching COVID-19. The first production was at the Bridge Theatre in London, directed in Nicholas Hytner and starring Ralph Fiennes performing the monologue.

The play was published by Faber & Faber in 2020 as Beat the Devil: A Covid Monologue. A film adaptation was released in 2021, also starring Fiennes. It was streamed by the Showtime network in the United States. It was aired on Sky Arts in the United Kingdom on 11 November 2021.
