= Kate Nelligan =

Canadian actress (born 1950)

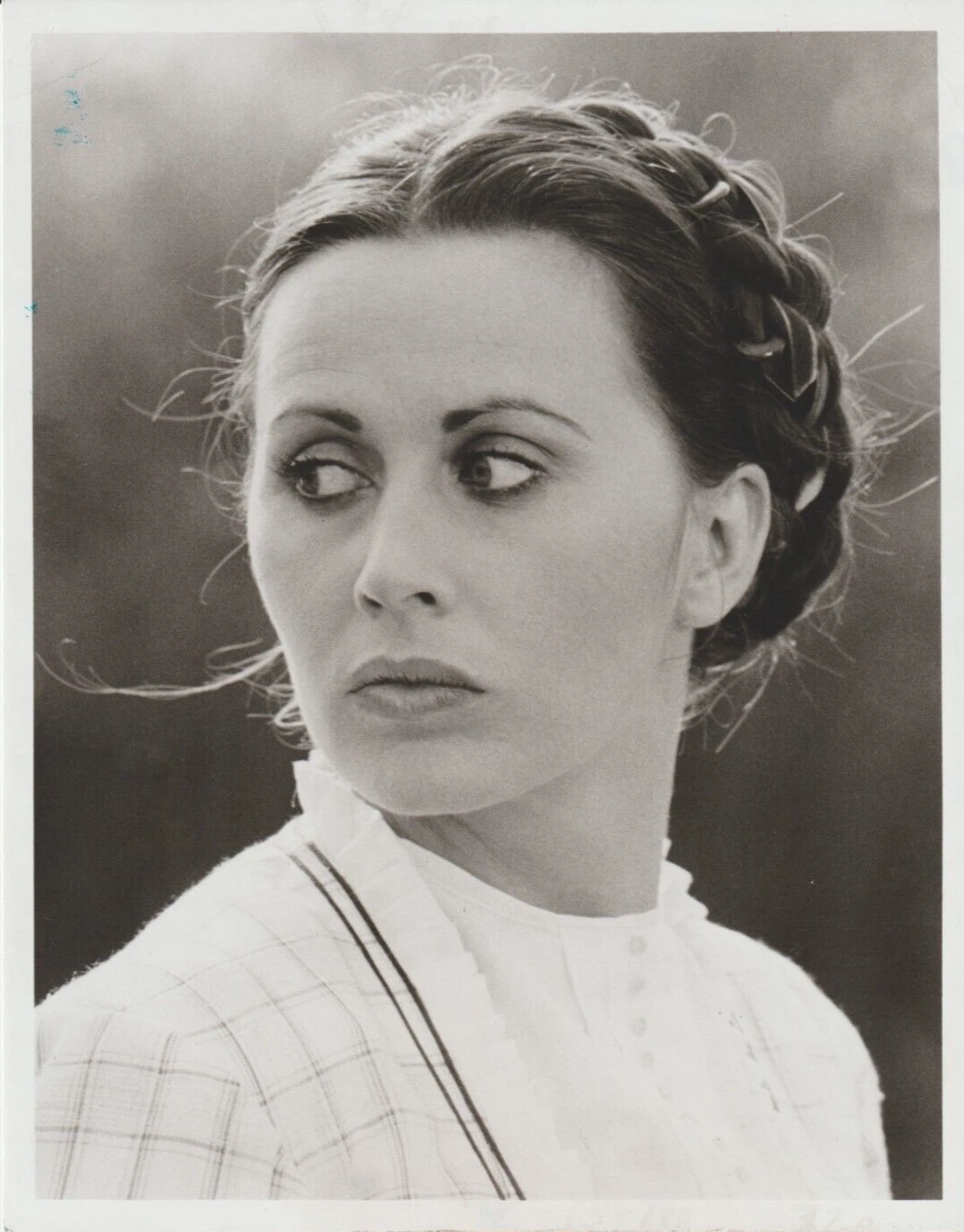
- Nelligan in a 1980 adaptation of Thérèse Raquin
- Born: Patricia Colleen Nelligan; March 16, 1950 (age 76); London, Ontario, Canada
- Education: Central School of Speech and Drama
- Occupation: Actress
- Years active: 1972–2010
- Spouse: Robert Reale (m. 1989; div. 2000)
- Children: 1 son

Patricia Colleen Nelligan (born March 16, 1950), known professionally as Kate Nelligan, is a Canadian retired stage, film and television actress. She was nominated for the Academy Award for Best Supporting Actress for the 1991 film The Prince of Tides, and the same year won the BAFTA Award for Best Actress in a Supporting Role for Frankie and Johnny. She is also a four-time Tony Award nominee for her work on Broadway, receiving nominations for Plenty (1983), A Moon for the Misbegotten (1984), Serious Money (1988) and Spoils of War (1989).

== Early life ==
Nelligan, the third of five children, was born in London, Ontario, the daughter of Patrick Joseph Nelligan and his wife Josephine Alice (née Deir). Her father was a factory repairman and municipal employee in charge of ice rinks and recreational parks, and her mother was a schoolteacher.

Her mother, whom Nelligan has described as "very powerful, very brilliant and very, very crazy", suffered from alcohol abuse and other psychological problems, and was institutionalized. Nelligan attended London South Collegiate Institute in London, Ontario, where she went by “Trish”, and then studied at Glendon College in Toronto, but did not graduate. Instead, she switched to studies at the Central School of Speech and Drama in London, England.

== Career ==
In August 1972, Nelligan launched her professional stage career as a "funny and convincing" Corie in the Bristol Old Vic production of Barefoot in the Park by Neil Simon. In the Bristol Old Vic studio space in the following April she took the role of Leila in The Screens, an abridgement by Howard Brenton of Jean Genet's savage Les Paravents. On television, she appeared in a regular role in the British television series The Onedin Line. In 1974, she was invited to London to play the part of Jenny in David Hare's play Knuckle at the Comedy Theatre, followed by a season with the National Theatre playing Ellie in Heartbreak House. 1975 saw her appear opposite Anthony Hopkins in the televised play The Arcata Promise followed by the televised theatrical version of The Count of Monte Cristo that featured an all-star cast of British and American actors. That same year her first feature-length film The Romantic Englishwoman was released.

In 1977, again with the National Theatre, Nelligan gave a "stunning" performance as Marianne, opposite Stephen Rea, in Horváth's Tales from the Vienna Woods directed by Maximilian Schell. Also in 1977, she played the part of Rosalind in As You Like It, directed by Trevor Nunn, opposite Peter McEnery in Stratford-upon-Avon and the following year in London. This she followed with Plenty, another play from David Hare, at the National Theatre, for which she received the 1978 "Best Actress" Evening Standard Theatre Award, with a runner-up position as "Best Actress in a New Play" in that season's Oliviers. She was cast in a similar role, playing opposite Bill Paterson, in Hare's BAFTA-award-winning companion play Licking Hitler, for BBC television.

Again on screen, in 1978 Nelligan played the part of Isabella in the BBC Television Shakespeare production of Measure for Measure, a performance that led the New York Times to describe her as providing "the image of idealized faultlessness". In 1979, she was the female lead alongside Frank Langella and Laurence Olivier in Dracula. In 1981, she starred opposite fellow Canadian Donald Sutherland in Eye of the Needle, a wartime espionage thriller based on the Ken Follett best-selling novel. Two years later Nelligan moved to New York City, where she earned nominations for the Tony Award as Best Actress in a Play three times and one Featured Actress in a Play between 1983 and 1989 for the five Broadway plays in which she appeared.

In 1991, Nelligan won a BAFTA for "Best Actress in a Supporting Role" for her performance in Frankie and Johnny. For her performance in the 1991 film The Prince of Tides she was nominated for the Academy Award for Best Supporting Actress. Between 1987 and 2004, she was nominated for five Gemini Awards for her performances in Canadian television mini-series and films and won twice, both in 1993. In 1996, she played the wife of James Mink in the CBS television film Captive Heart: The James Mink Story.

== Personal life ==
Nelligan and American composer Robert Reale married in 1989. Together they have a son. The couple divorced in 2000.

== Filmography ==
=== Film ===
Year	Title	Role	Notes
1975	The Romantic Englishwoman	Isabel	
1979	Dracula	Lucy Seward	
1980	Crossover	Peabody	
1981	Eye of the Needle	Lucy Rose	
1983	Without a Trace	Susan Selky	
1985	Eleni	Eleni Gatzoyiannis	
1987	Control	Sarah Howell	
1990	White Room	Jane	
1991	Frankie and Johnny	Cora	
1991	Shadows and Fog	Eve	
1991	The Prince of Tides	Lila Wingo Newbury	
1993	Fatal Instinct	Lana Ravine	
1994	Wolf	Charlotte Randall	
1995	Margaret's Museum	Catherine MacNeil	
1995	How to Make an American Quilt	Constance Saunders	
1996	Up Close & Personal	Joanna Kennelly	
1998	U.S. Marshals	US Marshal Catherine Walsh	
1998	Boy Meets Girl	Mrs. Jones	
1999	The Cider House Rules	Olive Worthington	
2007	Premonition	Joanne	

=== Television ===
Year	Title	Role	Notes
1971	Great Performances	Laura	"The Arcata Promise"
1973	The Edwardians	Alice Keppel	"Daisy"
1973	Country Matters	Christie Davenport	"The Four Beauties"
1973–74	The Onedin Line	Leonora Biddulph	Recurring role
1974	ITV Sunday Night Drama	Laura	"The Arcata Promise"
1975	The Count of Monte Cristo	Mercedes	TV film
1976	The Lady of the Camellias	Marguerite Gautier	"1.1", "1.2"
1977	The Sunday Drama	Ann	"Treats"
1977	Play for Today	Hilary	"Do as I Say"
1978	Play for Today	Anna Seaton	"Licking Hitler"
1979	Measure for Measure	Isabella	TV film – BBC Shakespeare series
1980	Thérèse Raquin	Thérèse Raquin	TV miniseries
1980	Play for Today	Caroline	"Dreams of Leaving"
1980	Forgive Our Foolish Ways	Vivien Lanyon	TV series
1982	Victims	Ruth Hession	TV film
1987	Kojak: The Price of Justice	Kitty	TV film
1989	Love and Hate: The Story of Colin and JoAnn Thatcher	JoAnn Thatcher	TV film
1991	American Playhouse	Barbara Hoyle	"Three Hotels"
1991	Performance	Kate	"Old Times"
1992	Road to Avonlea	Sydney Carver	"After the Honeymoon"
1992	Terror Stalks the Class Reunion	Kay	TV film
1992	The Great Diamond Robbery	Holly Plum	TV film
1992	Heritage Minutes	Emily Murphy	"Emily Murphy"
1993	Liar, Liar: Between Father and Daughter	Susan Miori	TV film
1993	Shattered Trust: The Shari Karney Story	Stephanie Chadford	TV film
1994	Golden Fiddles	Anne Balfour	TV miniseries
1994	In Spite of Love	Elise	TV film
1994	Million Dollar Babies	Helena Reid	TV miniseries
1995	A Mother's Prayer	Sheila Walker	TV film
1996	Captive Heart: The James Mink Story	Elizabeth Mink	TV film
1996	Calm at Sunset, Calm at Dawn	Margaret Pfeiffer	TV film
1999	Love Is Strange	Kathryn McClain	TV film
1999	Swing Vote	Justice Sara Marie Brandwynne	TV film
2000	Blessed Strangers: After Flight 111	Kate O'Rourke	TV film
2001	Walter and Henry	Elizabeth	TV film
2003	A Wrinkle in Time	Mrs. Which	TV film
2004	Human Cargo	Nina Wade	TV miniseries
2006	In from the Night	Vera Miller	TV film
2008	Eleventh Hour	Gepetto	"Resurrection"
2010	Law & Order: Special Victims Unit	Judge Sylvia Quinn	"Ace", "Gray"

=== Broadway plays ===
- Plenty (1983)
- A Moon for the Misbegotten (1984)
- Serious Money (1988)
- Spoils of War by Michael Weller, Music Box Theatre New York (1988)
- Love Letters (1989)
- An American Daughter (1997)

== Awards and nominations ==
Year	Award	Nominated work	Result
1978	Olivier Award for Best Actress in a New Play	Plenty	Nominated
1979	BAFTA TV Award for Best Actress	Measure for Measure	Nominated
1980	BAFTA TV Award for Best Actress	Dreams of Leaving / Therese Raquin / Forgive Our Foolish Ways	Nominated
1983	Tony Award for Best Actress in a Play	Plenty	Nominated
1984	Tony Award for Best Actress in a Play	A Moon for the Misbegotten	Nominated
1988	Tony Award for Best Featured Actress in a Play	Serious Money	Nominated
1989	Tony Award for Best Actress in a Play	Spoils of War	Nominated
1989	Emmy Award for Outstanding Lead Actress in a Drama Series	Road to Avonlea	Nominated
1990	Gemini Award for Best Actress in a Dramatic Program or Miniseries	Love and Hate: The Story of Colin and JoAnn Thatcher	Nominated
1990	Genie Award for Best Actress in a Leading Role	White Room	Nominated
1991	Academy Award for Best Supporting Actress	The Prince of Tides	Nominated
1991	BAFTA Award for Best Actress in a Supporting Role	Frankie and Johnny	Won
1993	Gemini Award for Best Actress in a Dramatic Program or Mini-Series	The Diamond Fleece	Won
1995	Genie Award for Best Actress in a Supporting Role	Margaret's Museum	Won
