= The Power of Yes =

2009 play by David Hare

- Original language: English
- Written by: David Hare
- Subject: 2008 financial crisis
- Genre: Drama

Premiere
- Date: 6 October 2009 – 18 April 2010
- Place: Lyttelton Theatre, London, United Kingdom
- Directed by: Angus Jackson
- http://www.nationaltheatre.org.uk/50093/productions/the-power-of-yes.html (defunct)

The Power of Yes is a 2009 play by English playwright David Hare. It is based on Hare's attempts to understand the 2008 financial crisis.

== Style and Theme ==
The play centers on an unnamed main character, a stand-in for Hare, as he conducts a series of interviews to learn about the events leading up to the 2008 financial crisis. Some of the characters in the play are based on real people, such as Myron Scholes or David Freud, who played a key role in the 2008 financial crisis, whereas others portray a particular occupation as a whole, such as banker or journalist.

According to The British Theatre Guide, the main message of the play is one of "wilful neglect by those charged with protecting innocent investors [...] In fact, [they] completely failed to accept that they have done anything wrong and that is the real problem." Paul Stuart of the World Socialist Web Site writes that "Hare is nevertheless able to point to the deeper-going systemic nature of the economic crisis, and its political implications," and "I was not the only person who came away from the National Theatre with a profound sense that the entire ruling elite is rotten to the core, indifferent to the social suffering they have produced, and should not be allowed any form of control over society’s wealth."

== Production History ==
Following the 2008 financial crisis, the National Theatre commissioned Hare to create a play about the crisis. Hare stated that his goal in writing the play was for the "immediate response [to] be journalistic," though he was much less concerned with the accuracy of its depiction or whether "its diagnosis was or wasn’t correct." He says he initially didn't want to write the play, committing only to a "perhaps" with "a whole lot of get-outs," because "I don't understand anything about economics [...] I was a) ignorant and b) stupid about money." He decided that the best way to explain the 2008 financial crisis was to put himself on the stage as a character.

All of the interviews depicted in the play are based on real interviews Hare conducted, with much of the dialogue delivered verbatim. Hare said that he thought "it was good for a writer to go out and be rebuked by reality [...] to go out and have your view of the world refreshed by actually talking to people, and learning about how they see things." Because he "hates verbatim theatre", he sought to use "the figure of the author" to "break the form up and to use it like music," drawing inspiration from Glenn Gould's album "Solitude Trilogy."

Hare posited that "if journalism is the first draft of history, then maybe I offer the second draft of history" and says he imparts each of his plays with a "metaphorical dimension which journalism can't give," describing the metaphor of The Power of Yes as "whether a group of people who impose their own version of the world can actually succeed in imposing that version or whether reality won't always come along and bite them [...] from behind."

== Reception ==
The Arts Desk suggested the play is "for the cerebrally inclined" and described it as "a thrilling, and depressing, story told with wit and wisdom." Their review was mostly positive, saying "the chief delight of the play is its ideas," and highlighting "the biggest laugh" of the play as the scene in which workers being laid off from Lehman Brothers have their boxes filled with "looted foodstuffs from their canteen" rather than personal possessions. However, they also criticized the play because it lacked a sense of urgency — "I never felt angry that my life was now on the line [...] Instead, we have an account of economic collapse told by the powerful and the articulate. Somewhere, out in the cold, the others remain. Who will tell their story?"

The Official London Theatre stated that "whilst this is not a play that you can sit back and simply enjoy without applying a caffeine-fuelled level of concentration, Hare’s questions – which range from the naive to the furious – are ones that we have all wanted to ask. The Power Of Yes is an excellent education into the delusions and ridiculous greed that got us into this mess in the first place." A review from The Guardian concurs that Hare asks poignant questions, offering up an example of the type of question Hare asks in the play — "why, for instance, when Icelandic banks or Bernard Madoff offered interest rates at double or triple the norm, did no one cry 'stinking fish'?"

Variety magazine gave the play a negative review, summarizing it as "a lucid, mostly cogent PowerPoint presentation with live actors." They describe each scene as an introduction to that specific person or topic that leaves the audience longing, stating "ultimately, that’s all it is: an introduction. We don’t engage because we don’t know who these people are, and only a very few of them return: Each person delivers his or her necessary snippet and is then dispatched." They also remarked that, compared to Hare's previous work Stuff Happens, "his research is inadequate, possibly due to limited access. Key figures are missing. The clearly unreachable Alan Greenspan only makes it in via reported speech. The result is oddly tilted toward the playwright’s own country."
