= Slag (play) =

Play by David Hare

Slag is a 1970 play by English playwright David Hare. Originally presented at the Hampstead Theatre Club, it transferred in a revived production to the Royal Court Theatre, and its notice there won David Hare the Evening Standard award for most promising new playwright. The original cast at the Royal Court were Lynn Redgrave, Anna Massey and Barbara Ferris.

Slag is a biting satire in which the only characters are the three teachers of a tiny isolated girls' school. The play begins with a mutual vow reminiscent of the vow that begins the play Lysistrata, in which Greek women vow to deny men sex as a protest against the Peloponnesian War. The three women teachers mutually pledge to abstain from sexual intercourse in protest against the dominance and abusive treatment of women by men, epitomized in the slur against women as "slags". Conflicts among the teachers' different visions of radical feminism, different motivations, and different interpretations of and commitment to the vow become the grist for duplicitous dominant and abusive acts among them and distracts them from their teaching. Dominance and feminism are ridiculed alike, while the number of pupils dwindles to zero in the resulting dysfunctional environment, leaving the three teachers to go their separate ways.

Slag was a breakthrough play for David Hare. Reputedly written by him in three days, working out of the back of a van, it launched his prolific and successful career as a playwright.
