= Stephen Mo Hanan =

American actor and street performer (1947–2025)

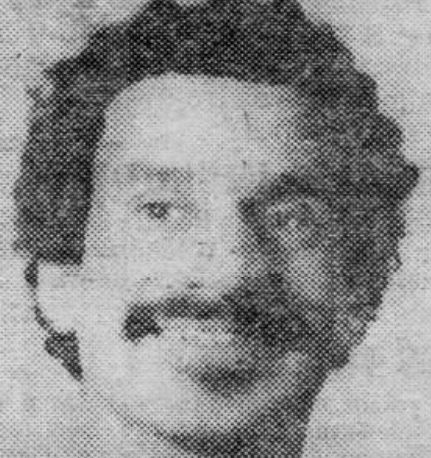
- Hanan in 1982
- Born: Stephen Hanan Kaplan; January 7, 1947; Washington, D.C., U.S.
- Died: April 3, 2025 (aged 78); New York City, U.S.
- Education: Harvard University
- Occupations: Actor, street performer
- Spouse: Gary Widlund

Stephen Hanan Kaplan (January 7, 1947 – April 3, 2025), known professionally as Stephen Mo Hanan, was an American actor and street performer. He was known for playing the three roles of Bustopher Jones, Asparagus and Growltiger in the Broadway play Cats, for which he was nominated for a Tony Award for Best Featured Actor in a Musical.

== Background ==
Stephen Hanan Kaplan was born in Washington, D.C., on January 7, 1947. He attended Harvard University, graduating in 1968. One of his classmates was television writer John Weidman, who gave him the nickname "Mo". After a brief period in New York, he lived in a commune in San Francisco in the 1970s, where he sang as a busker, and was once praised for his singing by Luciano Pavarotti outside the War Memorial Opera House.

== Career ==
Upon returning to New York at the end of the decade, he began working in professional theatre, adopting the stage name "Stephen Mo Hanan" because another actor was registered under the name "Stephen Kaplan". He appeared in several New York Shakespeare Festival productions, and made his Broadway debut as Samuel in the 1981 production of The Pirates of Penzance. The next year, he portrayed Bustopher Jones, Asparagus, and Growltiger when Cats premiered on Broadway. He was nominated for the Tony Award for Best Featured Actor in a Musical. He kept a diary during the show's production and published it in 2002 under the title A Cat's Diary.

Hanan appeared on stage in the United States and the United Kingdom. He and Jay Berkow wrote Jolson & Co., a play about Al Jolson, and he portrayed Jolson for its 1999 Off-Broadway premiere. In 2006, he returned to The Pirates of Penzance when he played Major-General Stanley in a Folksbiene production.

== Personal life and death ==
Hanan lived in Manhattan with his husband, Gary Widlund. He died at his home from a heart attack on April 3, 2025, at the age of 78. Hanan, who identified as a faerie, had suffered from a heart condition for years before his death.
