= Berlin (play) =

Berlin is a 2009 play by David Hare, in the form of a 55-minute monologue on Berlin and its history. It was first performed in March 2009 at the Royal National Theatre by the author himself, directed by Stephen Daldry.
