= Plenty (play) =

Play by David Hare

Plenty is a play by David Hare, first performed in 1978, about British post-war disillusion. The inspiration for Plenty came from the fact that 75 per cent of the women engaged in wartime SOE operations divorced in the immediate post-war years; the title is derived from the idea that the post-war era would be a time of "plenty", which proved untrue for most of England.

== Productions ==
Directed by the playwright, Plenty premiered in the Lyttelton Theatre on London's South Bank on 7 April 1978, featuring Kate Nelligan as Susan, the protagonist, and Stephen Moore as Raymond. It was nominated for the Olivier Award as Play of the Year and Nelligan as Best Actress in a New Play, losing to Whose Life is it Anyway? and Joan Plowright in Filumena.

The play premiered Off-Broadway on 21 October 1982, at the Public Theater, where it ran for 45 performances. Directed by Hare, Nelligan reprised the role of Susan, supported by Kelsey Grammer and Dominic Chianese. The play opened on Broadway (directed by Hare) on 6 January 1983 at the Plymouth Theatre, running for 92 performances and eleven previews. Nelligan was joined by Edward Herrmann, Daniel Gerroll, Madeleine Potter and George N. Martin.

In 1985, Hare's film adaptation was directed by Fred Schepisi, with Meryl Streep as Susan, and Charles Dance, Tracey Ullman, John Gielgud, Sting, Ian McKellen, and Sam Neill in supporting roles. Ullman and Gielgud were nominated for BAFTA Awards, and Gielgud was named Best Supporting Actor by the Los Angeles Film Critics Association and the National Society of Film Critics.

In 1999, Cate Blanchett played Susan in a production in London's Albery Theatre. From 3 to 26 February 2011 the play was revived at the Crucible Theatre as part of a David Hare season (alongside Racing Demon and The Breath of Life), featuring Hattie Morahan, Edward Bennett and Bruce Alexander.

The play was revived Off-Broadway at The Public Theater, opening on 20 October 2016. David Leveaux directed, with the cast that starred Rachel Weisz as Susan Traherne and Corey Stoll as Raymond Brock. The 1978, 1982, 1983 and 1999 scripts were all examined and Hare was consulted as the production took shape.

Plenty was revived at the Chichester Festival Theatre in June 2019. Kate Hewitt directed and it starred Rachael Stirling as Susan and Rory Keenan as Raymond.

== Overview ==
Kate Nelligan as Susan and Edward Herrmann as Raymond, Plymouth Theatre, 1983

Susan Traherne, a former secret agent, is a woman conflicted by the contrast between her past, exciting triumphs and her present, more ordinary life. She had worked behind enemy lines as a Special Operations Executive courier in Nazi-occupied France during World War II. However, she regrets the mundane nature of her present life, as the increasingly depressed wife of a diplomat whose career she has destroyed. Viewing society as morally bankrupt, Susan has become self-absorbed, bored, and destructive — the slow deterioration in her mental health mirrors the crises in the ruling class of post-war Britain.

Susan Traherne's story is told in a non-linear chronology, alternating between her wartime and post-wartime lives, illustrating how youthful dreams rarely are realised and how a person's personal life can affect the outside world.

== Reception ==
In the programme notes to the original production Hare writes that "...ambiguity is central to the idea of the play. The audience is asked to make its own mind up about each of the actions.". This ambiguity, however, was not understood by contemporary critics, who found themselves in a "consensus of confusion" over the work's meaning and significance. Colin Ludlow, writing in London Magazine later that year, found that his fellow critics had failed to understand Plenty through "pure laziness" and because they were offered no easy solutions to the social problems presented on stage. After later productions, both in the theatre and on film, "...time has shown the play to be a significant contribution to both British and world drama.".

One critic who recognized the play's worth early on was Sylviane Gold of The Boston Phoenix. Reviewing the play's Off-Broadway production, she wrote that "the two acts and 12 scenes of David Hare’s Plenty kept my ears in a state of high excitement from start to finish ... all of Plenty’s exchanges crackle with invention; every event is charged with the unexpected ... it’s hard to imagine anyone improving on Hare’s play."

== Awards and nominations ==
Sources: Playbill; Lortel

- 1983 Tony Award for Best Play (nominee)
- 1983 Tony Award for Best Actor in a Play (Herrmann, nominee)
- 1983 Tony Award for Best Actress in a Play (Nelligan, nominee)
- 1983 Tony Award for Best Featured Actor in a Play (Martin, nominee)
- 1983 New York Drama Critics' Circle Award for Best Foreign Play of the 1982–83 Season (winner)
- 1983 Drama League Awards
  - Distinguished Performance, Edward Herrmann (winner)
  - Distinguished Performance, Kate Nelligan (winner)

== See also ==
- Licking Hitler (1978) – a BBC Play for Today by David Hare
