= Gethsemane (play) =

Gethsemane is a play by David Hare. It premièred at the National Theatre in London on 4 November 2008.

The work opens with a reflection on the sway religious books hold over their adherents, but it soon establishes itself as a political piece dramatising the methods used by the governing Labour Party in Britain to raise party funds. Using lapses in the personal and public lives of the characters, often easily recognisable as incidents drawn from the lives of real politicians recently departed from office, the play illuminates the cynicism and expediency of a political party too long unchallenged in power.

The title Gethsemane refers to the life-changing decision by the character "Lori" to give up teaching and become a busker. Only later in the play, as other less idealistic characters avoid their own "Gethsemane moments", is it explained to her that in the Garden of Gethsemane Christ's decision was to stick with the plan and not to take the easy path.
