= Plenty (film) =

1985 film by Fred Schepisi

- Theatrical release poster
- Directed by: Fred Schepisi
- Screenplay by: David Hare
- Based on: Plenty by David Hare
- Produced by: Joseph Papp; Edward R. Pressman
- Starring: Meryl Streep; Charles Dance; Tracey Ullman; John Gielgud; Sting; Ian McKellen; Sam Neill
- Cinematography: Ian Baker
- Edited by: Peter Honess
- Music by: Bruce Smeaton
- Production companies: RKO Pictures; Edward R. Pressman Productions
- Distributed by: 20th Century Fox
- Release date: 20 September 1985
- Running time: 124 minutes
- Country: United States
- Language: English
- Budget: $10 million
- Box office: $6.1 million

Plenty is a 1985 American drama film directed by Fred Schepisi, starring Meryl Streep, and adapted by David Hare from his 1978 play.

Spanning nearly 20 years from the early 1940s to the 1960s, the plot focuses on Susan Traherne, an Englishwoman who is irreparably changed by her experiences as a fighter for the French Resistance during World War II when she has a one-night stand with a British intelligence agent. After the war ends, Susan returns to England and becomes determined to make a life for herself by achieving what she wishes in the post-war world which, after her time away, she finds trivial and inadequate, while acting with complete disregard for everybody around her.

== Plot ==
The film centers around the life of Susan Traherne, a British woman who becomes a courier for the British during World War II. In 1943, Susan waits in the woods for a message to be dropped by parachute when Lazar, another British operative, parachutes down after experiencing airplane trouble. They escape German troops and Susan opens up emotionally to Lazar. They have sex, but he then leaves abruptly the next morning, after receiving a warning over his wireless to "move on". Before parting, he leaves her a pair of cufflinks as a memento of their night together.

Two years later, Susan is with a man named Tony Radley when he suddenly dies of a heart attack. Raymond Brock from the British Embassy arrives and consoles Susan. She confesses that she and Radley were not truly married and asks Raymond to inform Radley's real wife that he died alone. Susan and Raymond develop a relationship, and she takes a job as a clerk while living with her bohemian friend Alice.

In 1953, Susan works for Queen Elizabeth's coronation committee. She asks Alice's former boyfriend, Mick, to father her child, but he is hesitant because she wants to raise the child alone. After her job is finished, Susan works in advertising briefly but finds it unsatisfying. Her attempts to conceive with Mick fail, and she then attempts to end the relationship, leading to a confrontation where she fires a gun above his head.

After Susan has a nervous breakdown, Raymond visits her in the hospital, and they eventually get married. However, Susan remains unsatisfied with her life despite their comfortable lifestyle. In 1956, she displays erratic behavior during a dinner party, embarrassing Raymond and their guests. Raymond's employer, Sir Leonard Darwin, announces his resignation due to the Suez Crisis.

Several years later, Susan and Raymond are living in Jordan, where Raymond has a diplomatic post. Alice visits and notices Susan's subdued demeanor. Susan seizes the opportunity to return to England for Sir Leonard Darwin's funeral, which angers Raymond. Susan refuses to return to Jordan, and in 1962, she confronts Sir Andrew Charleson about Raymond's stagnant career. She states her concern that Raymond now has no credible future with the Foreign Office, which Charleson subtly confirms. She then threatens suicide if Raymond is not promoted, leading to his dismissal and early retirement.

Back home, Susan argues with Raymond and leaves after he is knocked unconscious. She rekindles her love affair with Lazar, meeting him at a seaside hotel. After they have sex, Susan reveals her mental instability, but when she falls asleep, Lazar leaves, but not before discovering the cufflinks he had given her back during the war. She had been carrying them with her all these years.

In the final scene, Susan recalls her idealistic youth in the French countryside after the war. She talks with a local farmer and agrees to attend a party with his family to celebrate the end of the conflict. In an ironic ending, Susan proclaims that there will be many more days like this in the years to come.

== Cast ==
- Meryl Streep as Susan Traherne
- Charles Dance as Raymond Brock
- Tracey Ullman as Alice Park
- John Gielgud as Sir Leonard Darwin
- Sting as Mick
- Ian McKellen as Sir Andrew Charleson
- Sam Neill as Lazar
- Burt Kwouk as Mr Aung
- Pik-Sen Lim as Mme Aung

== Reception ==
=== Critical response ===
Plenty was met with mixed reviews upon release. It holds a 59% rating on Rotten Tomatoes from 17 critics. Audiences polled by CinemaScore gave the film an average grade of "C+" on an A+ to F scale.

Movie critic Roger Ebert gave the film three-and-a-half stars out of four. He said that Streep gave "a performance of great subtlety; it is hard to play an unbalanced, neurotic, self-destructive woman, and do it with such gentleness and charm... Streep creates a whole character around a woman who could have simply been a catalogue of symptoms.". Cultural and literary critic Tiffany Gilbert suggests that the "Englishness" that scriptwriter David Hare regarded as an essential theme of the movie was inescapably diminished by the casting of Hollywood star Meryl Streep as Susan: "[…] it inevitably loses some of its political edge[…] in ceding to the Hollywood fame machine." (albeit it had been a Canadian actor, Kate Nelligan, who had originally taken the part on the London and New York stages). Nelligan had played the part as a strong and capable woman, whereas Streep's depiction of neurosis transformed the play into a typical "Hollywood product".

=== Awards ===
Ullman and Gielgud were nominated for BAFTA Awards and Gielgud was named Best Supporting Actor by both the Los Angeles Film Critics Association and the National Society of Film Critics.

== Novel ==
A tie-in-novel by Andrew Osmond built on the movie's popularity with a pulp account of the post-war life of Lazar, Susan's lover.
