= Licking Hitler =

- Play for Today episode
- Episode no.: Series 8 Episode 12
- Directed by: David Hare
- Written by: David Hare
- Original air date: 10 January 1978

Episode chronology
← Previous "Scully's New Year's Eve"	Next → "Red Shift"

"Licking Hitler" is the 12th episode of the eighth series of the BBC anthology Play for Today British TV series. The episode was originally broadcast on 10 January 1978. "Licking Hitler" was written and directed by David Hare, produced by David Rose, and starred Kate Nelligan and Bill Paterson. Photography was by Ken Morgan and John Kenway.

"Licking Hitler" is about a black propaganda unit operating in England during World War II. Described as a work of "outstanding and unsettling power", it won the 1978 British Academy Television Award for Best Single Play.

Hare intended the work as a companion piece to his stage play Plenty (staged at the Lyttelton Theatre in April 1978 with Nelligan in the lead role of Susan Trahearne) and he wrote Plenty as he was editing Licking Hitler, scene and scene about. Its theme is similar to that of Plenty: the effect of war on individuals' private lives and treating their experiences as a metaphor for the England of the present.

== Theme ==
As with Plenty, the events Hare places in the context of war are intended as a metaphor for the post-war betrayal of the collective ideals of pre-war society, with the necessary deceits of the disinformation broadcaster representing the corrupt values of modern England.

The play's theme is the cruel relationship between Archie, the chief writer for an isolated black propaganda unit broadcasting to Germany in World War II, and his assistant and lover Anna. With the war won and the unit disbanded, neither Anna nor Archie can reconcile themselves to their new, mundane lives. Anna longs for the violent and abusive Archie, and for the excitement and meaning of her former work. Some critics have found this aspect of her character unrealistic, but Hare quotes poet Alan Ross to explain the spirit of the era: "The sadness and sexuality and alcohol were what everyone was wanting ... war was suddenly real and warm ... worth all the suffering and boredom and fear". To this he added his own romantic view of the period, with its undercurrents of violence and sexuality. Feminist writers have attacked the depiction of Anna, the wartime heroine, as flawed in that she passively continues to submit to Archie. Hare dismisses this view as "a clamour for a simpler morality" that fails to take account of his characterisation of a naive, vulnerable woman for whom sensuality is totally strange. It is in this abject predicament that she becomes "the conscience of the play".

After the war Anna establishes herself as a successful advertising copywriter but resents lying for no higher purpose than profit, a situation she comes to look upon as symbolising the post-war political life of England. Archie becomes a campaigning documentary film-maker, but he soon declines into a writer and director of derivative and poorly regarded action films.

== Factual basis ==
Hare's immediate inspiration for the work was a chance encounter with Sefton Delmer, a former adviser to Winston Churchill and wartime broadcaster to Germany from Soldatensender Calais. Delmer's book Black Boomerang provided the factual basis for the play. The character John Fennel's pragmatic attitude to lying when necessary was based on the methods of Richard Crossman, head of the German section of the Political Warfare Executive. Using the same technique Hare was to develop for his later "verbatim theatre" pieces, such as The Permanent Way, he travelled Britain interviewing former propagandists and broadcasters to enhance his script.

== Characters ==
- Kate Nelligan as Anna Seaton
- Bill Paterson as Archie MacLean
- Hugh Fraser as Will Langley
- Clive Revill as John Fennel
- Brenda Fricker as Eileen Graham
- Michael Mellinger as Karl
- George Herbert as Herr Jungke
- Patrick Monckton as Allardyce
- Jonathan Coy as Lotterby

== Production ==
The film was shot during the summer of 1977 at Compton Verney House, Warwickshire. This was Hare's first work behind the camera and he deliberately restricted himself to such camera techniques as were available in the 1940s. He notes that, as the writer, he had a clear idea of how scenes would relate to each other and so he shot no spare footage to allow for any adjustments while editing—a "highly dangerous" method—preventing subsequent editorial interference and allowing actors to shoot a scene continuously.

== See also ==
- Plenty, play by David Hare
