= Cam Christiansen =

Canadian animator

Cam Christiansen is a Canadian filmmaker, most noted for his 2017 feature documentary film Wall, and the 2023 documentary Echo of Everything.

Originally from Edmonton, Alberta, he studied painting and animation at the Alberta College of Art and Design.

He has twice been named to the Toronto International Film Festival's annual Canada's Top Ten list for his short films I Have Seen the Future in 2007, and Five Hole: Tales of Hockey Erotica in 2009.
