= The Absence of War =

1993 stage play by David Hare

- Faber & Faber paperback edition, 2001
- Original language: English
- Written by: David Hare
- Series: Racing Demon; Murmuring Judges; The Absence of War
- Subject: a fiction based on factual top-level Labour Party workings
- Genre: Drama

Premiere
- Date: 1993
- Place: Royal National Theatre; London, England

The Absence of War is a play by English playwright David Hare, the final instalment of his trilogy about contemporary Britain. The play premiered in 1993 at the Royal National Theatre, London, England.

The play is based on his behind the scenes observations of the Labour Party leadership during their unsuccessful General Election campaign of 1992.

The central character, party leader George Jones, is so smothered and constricted by his cautious advisers that eventually none of the great talents that brought him to prominence is visible to the public.
