= Murmuring Judges =

Murmuring Judges, first performed in 1991, is a scathing attack on the British legal system, and the second of a trilogy of plays by David Hare examining Great Britain's most hallowed institutions. The first play in the trilogy, Racing Demon, examines the Church of England, and the third, The Absence of War, examines political parties.

== Overview ==
Murmuring Judges takes a three-tiered view of a single instance of British "justice": the trial, conviction and appeal process of a dubiously guilty accomplice to a theft and kidnapping attack. The case is examined from the point of view of the police, the lawyers and the judges, as well as from inside the prison system. In each level, the injustices and insensitivities of the current system are highlighted as they are embodied by older proponents who cannot see past the traditions of British "justice". Contextually, the play also underlines problems that the system were facing in the late 1980s, early 1990s, such as a rise in immigration and a heightening sense of terror, such as the IRA. The play is not entirely bleak as it also showcases the possibility for change through the younger professionals both in the police force and in the legal profession. The overall message is not hopeful – an innocent man, Gerard, remains in prison with his life ravaged by despair and sexual assault. The pessimism is slightly relieved by the final image of the play, two young women, a barrister, Irina and a police officer, Sandra, who set to work on the arduous task of revolutionising the system.
