= David Hare (playwright) =

English playwright (born 1947)

Sir David Hare FRSL
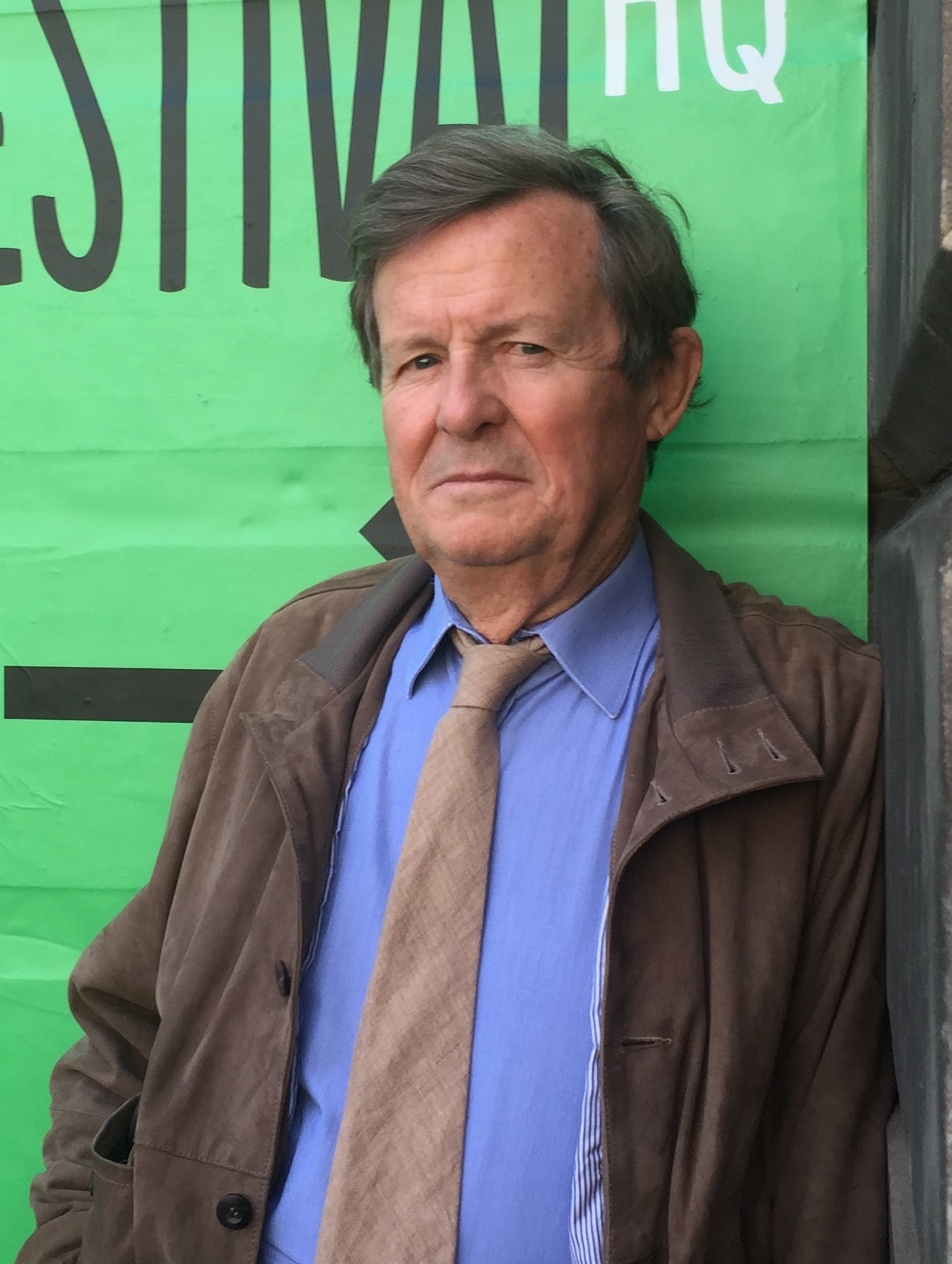
- Hare in 2018
- Born: David Hare; 5 June 1947 (age 79); St Leonards-on-Sea, Hastings, Sussex, England
- Education: Jesus College, Cambridge (MA)
- Occupations: Playwright; screenwriter; director
- Spouse(s): Margaret Matheson (m. 1970; div. 1980) Nicole Farhi (m. 1992)
- Writing career
- Notable work: Full list
- Notable awards: Full list

Sir David Hare FRSL (born 5 June 1947) is an English playwright, screenwriter, and director. Known for his work on stage and screen, he has received numerous accolades, including two Laurence Olivier Awards, a British Academy Television Award, and a Writers Guild of America Award, in addition to nominations for three Tony Awards, two Academy Awards, two British Academy Film Awards, and two Golden Globes.

In the West End, he had his greatest success with the plays Plenty (1978), which he adapted into a 1985 film starring Meryl Streep, Racing Demon (1990), Skylight (1997), and Amy's View (1998). The four plays ran on Broadway in 1982–83, 1996, 1998 and 1999 respectively, earning Hare three Tony Award nominations for Best Play for the first three and two Laurence Olivier Awards for Best New Play. His other notable projects on stage include A Map of the World, Pravda (starring Anthony Hopkins at the Royal National Theatre in London), Murmuring Judges, The Absence of War, The Vertical Hour, and Straight Line Crazy starring Ralph Fiennes.

Hare both wrote and directed the BBC's much acclaimed Worricker Trilogy of films — Page Eight (2011), Turks & Caicos (2014), and Salting the Battlefield (2014) — as well as scripting television series for the BBC, Collateral (2018) and Roadkill (2020). For writing Stephen Daldry dramas The Hours (2002) and The Reader (2008), he received Academy Award and BAFTA nominations for Best Adapted Screenplay, and won Writers Guild of America Award in the same category for the former. He has been associate director of the National Theatre since 1984.

== Life and career ==
=== Early years and education ===
David Hare was born on 5 June 1947 in St Leonards-on-Sea, Hastings, Sussex, and was raised – first in a flat, then in a semi-detached house – in Bexhill-on-Sea, the son of Agnes Cockburn (née Gilmour) and Clifford Theodore Rippon Hare, a passenger ship's purser in the Merchant Navy. His father's elder brother was the cricketer Steriker Hare. The Hare family claims descent from the Earls of Bristol.

Hare was educated at Lancing College, an independent school in Sussex, and at Jesus College, Cambridge (MA (Cantab.), English Literature). While at Cambridge, he was the hiring manager on the Cambridge University Amateur Dramatic Club Committee in 1968.

=== Early work ===
Hare worked with the Portable Theatre Company from 1968 to 1971. His first play, Slag, was produced in 1970, the same year in which he married his first wife, Margaret Matheson; the couple had three children and divorced in 1980. He was Resident Dramatist at the Royal Court Theatre, London, from 1970 to 1971, and in 1973 became resident dramatist at the Nottingham Playhouse. He co-founded the Joint Stock Theatre Company with David Aukin and Max Stafford-Clark in 1975. Hare's play Plenty was produced at the National Theatre in 1978. Aside from films, he has also written teleplays such as Licking Hitler for the BBC and Saigon: Year of the Cat for Thames Television.

=== 1980s ===
Hare founded a film company called Greenpoint Films in 1982, and among screenplays he has written are Plenty, Wetherby, Strapless, and Paris by Night. In 1983, his play A Map of the World was produced at the Royal National Theatre. The production starred Bill Nighy, Diana Quick, and Ronald Hines. The play is set at the Unesco conference on poverty held in Bombay in 1978. It transferred to The Public Theater in 1985, starring Alfre Woodard, Elizabeth McGovern, and Zeljko Ivanek. In a mixed review, The New York Times theatre critic Frank Rich wrote: "The play is in part about conflicting points of view – about how reactionaries and leftists look at geopolitics, how journalists and novelists look at events and how the West and the Third World look at each other."

In 1985, Hare wrote Pravda with Howard Brenton, its title referring to the Russian Communist party newspaper Pravda. The play, a satire on the mid-1980s newspaper industry, in particular the Australian media and press baron Rupert Murdoch, stars Anthony Hopkins in a role that earned him the Laurence Olivier Award. Hare became the associate director of the National Theatre in 1984, and has since seen many of his plays produced, including his trilogy about major British institutions: Racing Demon, Murmuring Judges, and The Absence of War. He has also directed many other plays aside from his own works, notable examples being The Pleasure Principle by Snoo Wilson, Weapons of Happiness by Howard Brenton, and King Lear by William Shakespeare for the National Theatre. Hare is also the author of a collection of lectures on the arts and politics called Obedience, Struggle, and Revolt (2005).

=== 1990s ===
In 1990, Hare wrote Racing Demon; part of a trio of plays about British institutions, it focuses on the Church of England, and tackles issues such as gay ordination, and the role of evangelism in inner-city communities. The play debuted at the National Theatre and received the Laurence Olivier Award for Best New Play. The play transferred to the Broadway stage at the Vivian Beaumont Theatre in 1995. The production starred Paul Giamatti, Denis O'Hare, and Kathleen Chalfant. The play was nominated for the Tony Award for Best Play.

In 1995, Hare's translation of Mother Courage and Her Children by Bertolt Brecht was produced in London. In 1996, Hare wrote Skylight, a play about a woman who receives an unexpected visit from her former lover whose wife has recently died. Michael Gambon and Lia Williams starred in the original production, which received the Laurence Olivier Award for Best New Play. The following year, the production transferred to the Broadway stage, where it was nominated for the Tony Award for Best Play.

In 1998, Hare wrote Amy's View, a play that deals with an emotional relationship between a mother and her daughter. The original production at the Royal National Theatre starred Judi Dench, Samantha Bond, and Ronald Pickup. Dench starred in the Broadway transfer, earning the Tony Award for Best Actress in a Play in 1999.

=== 2000s ===
In 2001, Hare wrote My Zinc Bed, which premiered at the Royal Court Theatre starring Tom Wilkinson, Julia Ormond, and Steven Mackintosh. The play was adapted into a television film of the same name in 2008. The play received the Laurence Olivier Award for Best New Play nomination, Hare's eighth Olivier Award nomination. The following year Hare wrote the screenplay for The Hours (2002) adapted from the Michael Cunningham book of the same name. The film starred an ensemble cast that included Meryl Streep, Julianne Moore, and Nicole Kidman as women from three different time periods struggling against adversity. Hare received the Writers Guild of America Award for Best Adapted Screenplay as well as nominations for the Academy Award and BAFTA Award in the same category. He was also nominated for the Golden Globe Award for Best Screenplay.

In 2008, he adapted Bernhard Schlink's 1995 novel into Stephen Daldry's film The Reader starring Kate Winslet and Ralph Fiennes. The film focuses on a romance in the 1950s between a teenaged boy and an older woman (Winslet) who is later discovered to have been a Nazi guard and is on trial for committing war crimes during the Holocaust. The film was well reviewed and earned Hare his second Oscar and BAFTA nominations for Best Adapted Screenplay as well as his second nomination for a Golden Globe.

=== 2010s ===
Hare's 2011 play South Downs, based on his own experiences of being schooled at Lancing College, was well received at the Chichester Festival, and was adapted as a Saturday Drama on BBC Radio 4.

In December 2011, it was announced that his monologue Wall about the Israeli West Bank barrier was being adapted by Cam Christiansen as a live-action/animated documentary by the National Film Board of Canada; originally slated for completed in 2014, Wall premiered at the Calgary International Film Festival in 2017. In November 2012, The New School for Drama selected Hare as temporary Artist-in-residence, during which he interacted with student playwrights about his experience in varying mediums. His career is examined in the Reputations strand on TheatreVoice. He is particularly well known for incisive commentary on the problems of public institutions. Raymond Williams once said, sardonically, that the public services are largely managed by the nation's "upper servants". Hare addresses this group, providing an analysis of the workings of the institutions: he is, he has said, interested in the struggle to make procedures work better – right now – not in waiting until some revolution, somehow, sometime, comes about to raze the current system altogether, to replace it with perfection.

In 2016, Daily Variety reported that the Jonathan Franzen novel Purity was in the process of being adapted into a 20-hour limited series by Todd Field who would share writing duties with Franzen and Hare. It would star Daniel Craig as Andreas Wolf and be executive produced by Field, Franzen, Craig, Hare & Scott Rudin. However, in a February 2018 interview with The Times London, Hare said that, given the budget for Field's adaptation (170 million), he doubted it would ever be made, but added "It was one of the richest and most interesting six weeks of my life, sitting in a room with Todd Field, Jonathan Franzen and Daniel Craig bashing out the story. They're extremely interesting people."

In 2016, Hare wrote the screenplay for Denial based on Deborah Lipstadt's History on Trial: My Day in Court with a Holocaust Denier. The film starred Tom Wilkinson, Rachel Weisz, and Timothy Spall. The film dramatises the Irving v Penguin Books Ltd case, in which Lipstadt, a Holocaust scholar, was sued by Holocaust denier David Irving for libel. The film premiered at the Toronto International Film Festival to positive reviews. It later received the BAFTA Award for Outstanding British Film nomination.

In 2018, Hare wrote his first limited series, Collateral, starring Carey Mulligan, Billie Piper, John Simm, Nicola Walker and Nathaniel Martello-White. Over four parts it told a state-of-the-nation story revolving around the murder of a pizza delivery driver, and its implications through the wider community. Hare wrote in an introduction for a BBC press release that the TV series was about, '...the third great challenge - the waves of migration prompted by war, poverty and fresh persecution...'. It was broadcast in February 2018.

Also in 2018 he wrote another state-of-the-nation play - this time about the Labour party in the late 2010s, with the title I'm Not Running, about a local politician being faced with an impossible choice. It premiered in October 2018 at the National Theatre - his seventeenth play to premiere there.

His eighteenth was Peter Gynt, after Ibsen. It was a modern reimagining, set in highly realistic forests to grand banqueting halls, amongst other settings. The three-and-a-half hour long play, directed by Jonathan Kent, earned itself, amongst multitudinous other reviews, four stars in The Guardian for being a, according to Michael Billington, 'sharp satire on contemporary mores'.

Ralph Fiennes directed Hare's screenplay about Russian ballet dancer Rudolf Nureyev in The White Crow, which premiered in 2019, based on Rudolf Nureyev: A Life by Julie Kavanaugh.

=== 2020s ===
In 2020, Hare contracted COVID-19, an experience reflected in his monologue Beat the Devil, with Ralph Fiennes in the starring role.

During October 2020, with the world in lockdown, his second full-length limited series, Roadkill, premiered on BBC One. The Guardian's film and television critic, Lucy Mangan, gave it four stars, describing it as a, '...reminder – as if we needed one – that political ambition is rarely pure.' It starred Hugh Laurie as Peter Laurence: an ambitious, clever, charismatic Conservative politician who has multiple sorts of pressures: from his wife to his children, to a comb arriving in the mail, his boss the Prime Minister and his advisor Duncan Knock. However, as Mangan mentions in her review, despite it being '...set in an alternative universe where neither Brexit nor the pandemic dominate each character's every thought gives this unspooling tale of greed, weakness and corruption a generic or pleasingly retro mood, depending on your take.' It was broadcast to a generally positive reception.

In 2021, Hare published a collection of essays and poems entitled, We Travelled. It is a mix of published essays, such as his Guardian article on his ideal theatre, the Archbishop of Canterbury, the rapist Jimmy Savile, and early 2020s Conservatism among many more.

In 2022, Hare wrote Straight Line Crazy. The play is set in the 1920s through the 1960s in New York City and centres on the life of Robert Moses, portrayed by Fiennes. Fiennes stars as Moses, once a powerful man in New York and the "master builder" of infrastructure from new parks, bridges and expressways. During his working life, he served on the New York State Council of Parks and was the New York Secretary of State. The play premiered at the Bridge Theatre in London in March 2022. The play transferred to the New York stage with Fiennes at The Shed in October 2022.

A play titled Grace Pervades, starring Ralph Fiennes and directed by Jeremy Herrin premiered in summer 2025 at Theatre Royal, Bath. The play explores the lives of the thespians Henry Irving, Ellen Terry, Edith Craig and Edward Gordon Craig (Terry's two children with Edward William Godwin). It transferred to the Theatre Royal Haymarket in the West End in April 2026.

Hare was set to reunite with producer Scott Rudin for a new play called Montauk, which would be directed by Joe Mantello and star Laurie Metcalf. However in May 2026, Manhattan Theatre Club announced they were putting on the play instead, as Rudin bowed out over "creative differences over the direction of the script". Montauk depicts a love story between notorious painter Jared Speight and star writer Roxy Margaux in a decades-long love affair. Laura Linney is to star and Daniel Sullivan is to direct. It will be performed at the Samuel J. Friedman Theatre in Spring 2027.

=== Personal life ===
Hare has three children with Margaret Matheson, a television producer, whom he married in 1970 and divorced in 1980. During the 1980s, he had a romantic relationship with American actress Blair Brown. He married the French fashion designer Nicole Farhi in 1992.

In 1993, Hare's best friend Sarah Matheson was diagnosed with Multiple System Atrophy and died from the disease in 1999. In January 2015, Hare broadcast the BBC Radio 4 appeal to raise money for the Multiple System Atrophy Trust, which was founded by Matheson. In 1993, Hare sold his archive to the Harry Ransom Center at the University of Texas at Austin. The archive consists of typescript drafts, notes, rehearsal scripts, schedules, production notes, correspondence, theatre programs, resumes, photographs, and published texts associated with Hare's plays, teleplays, screenplays, and essays, as well as foreign-language translations of Hare's works; works by other authors; personal correspondence; minutes of meetings; and Hare's English papers from Cambridge University.

== Works ==
=== Selected credits ===
==== Theatre ====
- Inside Out (1968) (with Tony Bicat)
- How Brophy Made Good (1969)
- What Happened to Blake (1970)
- Slag (1970)
- The Great Exhibition (1972)
- Brassneck (1973) (with Howard Brenton)
- Knuckle (1974)
- Fanshen (1975). Based on Fanshen (1966)
- Teeth 'n' Smiles (1975)
- Plenty (1978)
- A Map of the World (1982)
- Pravda (1985) (with Howard Brenton)
- The Bay at Nice, and Wrecked Eggs (1986)
- The Knife (1987) (with Nick Bicat and Tim Rose Price)
- The Secret Rapture (1988)
- Racing Demon (1990)
- Murmuring Judges (1991)
- The Absence of War (1993)
- Skylight (1995)
- Amy's View (1997)
- Ivanov (1997; 2015) (adapted from Chekhov)
- The Blue Room (1998) (adapted from Schnitzler)
- The Judas Kiss (1998)
- Via Dolorosa (1998)
- My Zinc Bed (2000)
- Platonov (2001; 2015) (adapted from Chekhov)
- The Breath of Life (2002)
- The Permanent Way (2003)
- Stuff Happens (2004)
- The Vertical Hour (2006)
- Gethsemane (2008)
- Berlin (2009)
- Wall (2009)
- The Power of Yes (2009)
- South Downs (2011)
- Behind the Beautiful Forevers (2014)
- The Seagull (2015) (adapted from Chekhov)
- The Moderate Soprano (2015)
- The Red Barn (2016)
- I'm Not Running (2018)
- Beat the Devil (2020)
- Straight Line Crazy (2022)
- Grace Pervades (2025)
- Montauk (upcoming, 2027)

==== Film ====
- Wetherby (1985) (also directed)
- Plenty (1985)
- Paris By Night (1988) (also directed)
- Strapless (1989) (also directed)
- Damage (1992)
- The Secret Rapture (1993)
- The Designated Mourner (1997) (directed only)
- The Hours (2002)
- The Reader (2008)
- Denial (2016)
- Wall (2017)
- The White Crow (2018)

==== Television ====
- Licking Hitler (1978) (also directed)
- The Young Indiana Jones Chronicles (Lucasfilm, 1993) (directed the episode "Paris, May 1919")
- My Zinc Bed (2008)
- Page Eight (BBC, 2011) (also directed)
- Turks & Caicos (BBC, 2014) (also directed)
- Salting the Battlefield (BBC, 2014) (also directed)
- Collateral (Netflix, 2018)
- Roadkill (BBC One, 2020)
- Beat the Devil (Showtime/Skyarts, 2021)

==== Prose ====
- Writing Left-Handed. Faber and Faber. 1991. ASIN B00SLV3H8M.
- Asking Around: The Background to the David Hare Trilogy. Faber and Faber. 1993. ISBN 978-0571170630.
- The Blue Touch Paper: A Memoir. Faber and Faber. 2015. ISBN 978-0571294336.
- We Travelled: Essays and Poems. Faber and Faber. 2021. ISBN 978-0571369515.

== Awards and honours ==
For his work in theatre, he has received eight Laurence Olivier Award nominations for Best New Play, winning the award twice, for Racing Demon in 1990 and Skylight in 1996. He has also received three Tony Award nominations for Best Play for Plenty in 1983, Racing Demon in 1996 and Skylight in 1997. He also received the John Llewellyn Rhys Prize (1975), a BAFTA Award (1979), the New York Drama Critics Circle Award (1983), and the London Theatre Critics' Award (1990).

Hare has received various award nominations for his film work, including two Academy Award nominations for The Hours (2002), and The Reader (2008); two Golden Globe Award nominations; and five BAFTA Award nominations. He was awarded the Berlin Film Festival Golden Bear in 1985. In 1997, he was a member of the jury at the 47th Berlin International Film Festival.

He has also received various honours including knighthoods, degrees, and fellows. He was elected a Fellow of the Royal Society of Literature in 1985. This gave him the Post Nominal Letters "FRSL" for Life. He was awarded an Honorary Fellowship by Jesus College, Cambridge, in 2001.

He was knighted in the 1998 Queen's Birthday Honours List for services to theatre.

He was awarded the Honorary degree of Doctor of Letters (D.Litt.) by the University of East Anglia in 2010.

== See also ==
- List of British playwrights since 1950
- List of Academy Award winners and nominees from Great Britain
- List of European Academy Award winners and nominees
- List of atheists in film, radio, television and theatre
