= Pravda (play) =

Satirical play by David Hare and Howard Brenton

Original National Theatre poster

Pravda is a satirical play by David Hare and Howard Brenton, which explores the role of journalism in society. It was first produced at the National Theatre in London on 2 May 1985, directed by Hare and starring Anthony Hopkins in the role of Lambert Le Roux, a white South African media mogul. Labelled a "Fleet Street comedy", it is a satire on the mid-1980s British newspaper industry during the Thatcher era, in particular the Australian press baron Rupert Murdoch. Its title refers to the Bolsheviks' (later the CPSU's) own official party newspaper Pravda (lit. 'Truth').

The play won 1985 Best Play from both the Evening Standard Theatre Awards and City Limits magazine. It has been described as "one of the biggest hits in the history of the National Theatre".

== Original cast ==
- Andrew May - Tim McInnerny
- Bill Smiley - Richard Hope
- Bishop of Putney - Daniel Thorndike
- Cartoonist - William Sleigh
- Cliveden Whicker-Baskett - Guy Williams
- D P P Payne - Christopher Baines
- Donna Le Roux - Zoe Rutland
- Eaton Sylvester - Bill Nighy
- Elliot Fruit-Norton - Basil Henson
- Hamish McLennan; Hannon Spot - Fred Pearson
- Harry Morrison - Ron Pember
- Jack ‘Breaker’ Bond - Bill Moody
- Journalist - Robert Ralph
- Journalist - Paul Stewart
- Lambert Le Roux - Anthony Hopkins
- Larry Punt - Mark Jax
- Leander Scroop - Nigel Le Vaillant
- Lord Silk; Ian Ape-Warden - Olivier Pierre
- Michael Quince M.P. - Peter Blythe
- Miles Foley; Mac ‘Whipper’ Wellington; *Doug Fantom - Ian Bartholomew
- Moira Patterson - Patricia Franklin
- Newsvendor - Glenn Williams
- Photographer - Desmond Adams
- Princess Jill - Harriet Thorpe
- Rebecca Foley - Kate Buffery
- Sir Stamford Foley - Ivor Roberts
- Suzie Fontaine - Miranda Foster
- Waiter - Norman Warwick

== Critical reception ==
Punch called it "A savagely bitchy and often wildly funny evening"; the Financial Times noted "A magnificent epic drama"; and The Observer wrote of "sulphurous and crackling entertainment".
