= My Zinc Bed (film) =

2008 British television film

- Written by: David Hare
- Directed by: Anthony Page
- Starring: Paddy Considine; Jonathan Pryce; Uma Thurman
- Music by: Simon Boswell
- Country of origin: United Kingdom
- Original language: English

Production
- Producers: Frank Doelger; Lee Morris; Tracey Scoffield
- Cinematography: Brian Tufano
- Running time: 69 minutes

Original release
- Release: 27 August 2008

My Zinc Bed is a 2008 British television drama film directed by Anthony Page and based on the stage play of the same name by David Hare. It was commissioned by the BBC and produced in association with HBO Films.

== Plot ==
The one-off drama follows Alcoholics Anonymous member Paul Peplow (Paddy Considine) who is sent to interview wealthy businessman Victor Quinn (Jonathan Pryce). Victor's obsession with addiction soon makes sense when Paul meets Victor's beautiful wife Elsa (Uma Thurman) – who reveals that she herself is a recovering alcoholic.

== Locations ==
The film is shot in many locations across London, including the now-standard "crossing the Thames" introductory shot backdropped by St. Paul's Cathedral and the 30 St Mary Axe Swiss Re office building (commonly referred to as "The Gherkin"). The Quinn's new residence is shown to be in the locale of the real Regent's Park.

== Reception ==
=== Critical ===
The drama was well received by some critics, mostly overcoming the distraction of its high-powered cast. It was both commended and criticized for its retention of its stage-play roots.

=== Ratings ===
The drama was seen by around 1 million viewers, considered poor ratings, especially given Thurman's involvement.
