= My Zinc Bed (play) =

Play written by David Hare

My Zinc Bed is a play by the British playwright David Hare. It premiered at the Royal Court Theatre in 2000 and its three characters were played in that production by Tom Wilkinson, Julia Ormond and Steven Mackintosh, with Hare himself directing. It was adapted into a television film, in 2008.
