= Racing Demon (play) =

Play written by David Hare

- Cottesloe, National Theatre window card, 1990
- Written by: David Hare
- Original language: English
- Series: Racing Demon; Murmuring Judges; The Absence of War
- Subject: Clergymen struggle to make sense of their mission
- Genre: Drama
- Setting: 1980s; South London

Premiere
- Date premiered: 1990
- Place premiered: Cottesloe, National Theatre; London England

Racing Demon is a 1990 play by English playwright David Hare. Part of a trio of plays about British institutions, it focuses on the Church of England, and tackles issues such as gay ordination, and the role of evangelism in inner-city communities. The play debuted at the National Theatre, in London.

== Awards and nominations ==
=== Awards ===
- 1990 Laurence Olivier Award for Best New Play

=== Nominations ===
- 1996 Tony Award for Best Play
