= Onat =

Onat is a surname and a masculine given name of Turkish origin. Notable people with the name include:

== Surname ==
- Çiğdem Selışık Onat (born 1939), Turkish actress
- Emin Halid Onat (1908–1961), Turkish academic and architect
- İlhan Onat (1929–2013), Turkish chess player and pharmacist

== Given name ==
- Onat Kazaklı (born 1993), Turkish rower
- Onat Kutlar (1936–1995), Turkish writer
