= Judith Light =

American actress (born 1949)

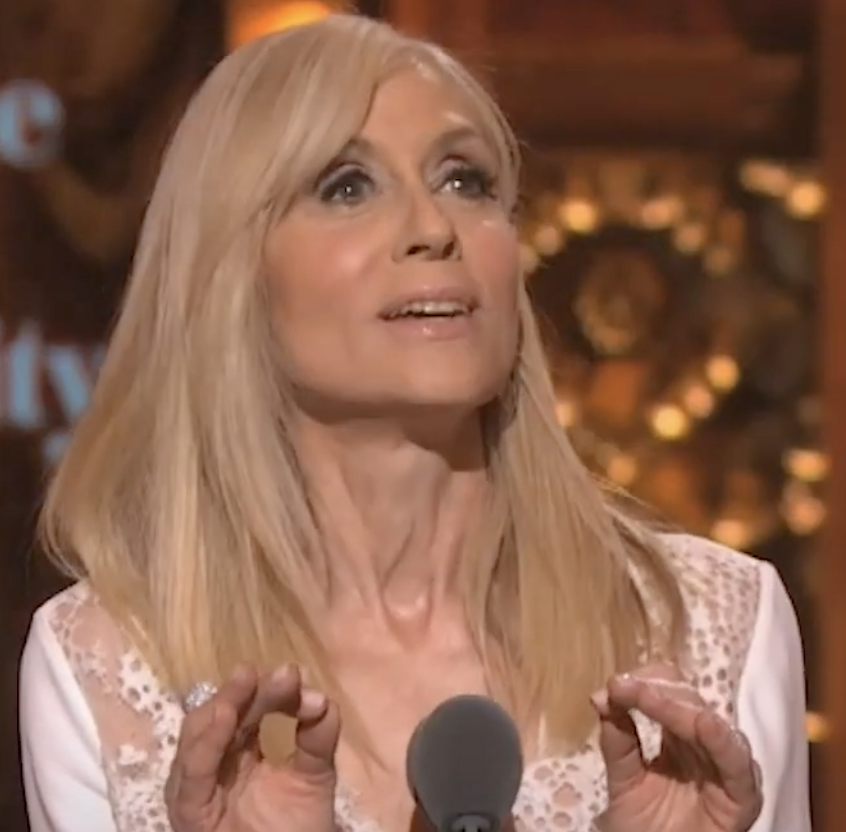
- Light in 2019
- Born: Judith Ellen Light; February 9, 1949 (age 77); Trenton, New Jersey, U.S.
- Education: Doane Academy
- Alma mater: Carnegie Mellon University (BFA)
- Occupation: Actress
- Years active: 1969–present
- Known for: Who's the Boss?; One Life to Live; Other Desert Cities; The Assembled Parties
- Spouse: Robert Desiderio (m. 1985)
- Awards: Tony Award for Best Featured Actress in a Play; Hollywood Walk of Fame
- Website: judithlight.com

Judith Ellen Light (born February 9, 1949) is an American actress. She made her professional stage debut in 1970, before making her Broadway debut in the 1975 revival of A Doll's House. Her breakthrough role was in the ABC daytime soap opera One Life to Live from 1977 to 1983, where she played the role of Karen Wolek; for this role, she won two consecutive Daytime Emmy Awards for Outstanding Lead Actress in a Drama Series in 1980 and 1981. In 2024, Light won the Primetime Emmy Award for Outstanding Guest Actress in a Comedy Series for Poker Face.

Light starred as Angela Bower in the long-running ABC sitcom Who's the Boss? from 1984 to 1992. Light played the recurring role of Elizabeth Donnelly in the NBC legal crime drama Law & Order: Special Victims Unit (2002–2010) and also played Claire Meade in the ABC comedy-drama Ugly Betty (2006–2010), for which she was nominated for a Primetime Emmy Award in 2007. From 2013 to 2014, she played the role of villainous Judith Brown Ryland in the TNT drama series Dallas. In 2014, she began starring as Shelly Pfefferman in the critically acclaimed Amazon Studios dark comedy-drama series Transparent, for which she received several Golden Globe, Primetime Emmy, and Critics' Choice Award nominations. She again received Primetime Emmy and Critics' Choice Award nominations for playing Marilyn Miglin in The Assassination of Gianni Versace: American Crime Story in 2018. In 2019, she was awarded a star on the Hollywood Walk of Fame.

Light received her first nomination for a Tony Award in 2011, for her performance in the original Broadway play Lombardi. In 2012 and 2013, she won two consecutive Tony Awards for Best Featured Actress in a Play, for her performances in Other Desert Cities and The Assembled Parties.

== Early life ==
Light was born to a Jewish family in Trenton, New Jersey. She is the daughter of Pearl Sue (née Hollander), a model, and Sidney Licht, an accountant. Light graduated from high school in 1966 at St. Mary's Hall–Doane Academy in Burlington, New Jersey. She graduated from Carnegie Mellon University with a degree in drama. She recalled graduating with a class of 15 actors who were there all four years. She said "it was a really rigorous program and I thank God for it because it was an amazing training program." She made her professional debut on stage in Richard III at the California Shakespeare Festival in 1970.

== Career ==
=== Early work and breakthrough ===
Light made her Broadway debut in A Doll's House in 1975. She also starred in the 1976 Broadway play Herzl. Light also acted for such theatre companies as the Milwaukee Repertory Theater and the Seattle Repertory Theatre. In the late 1970s, Light went through a real crisis after a period of not landing any parts. Broke, she almost quit acting, because she felt that she was not contributing to the theater.

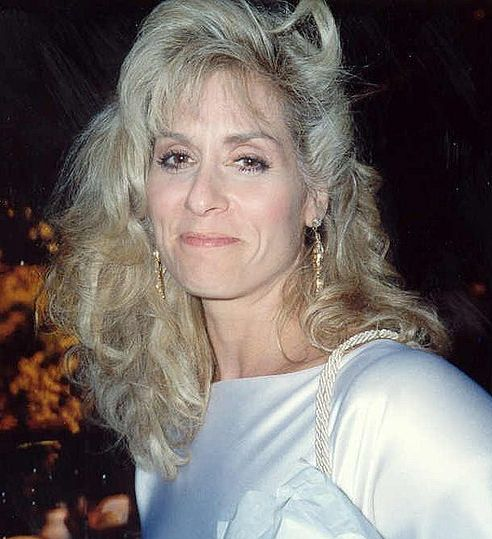
Light at the Governor's Ball following the 1989 Annual Emmy Awards

In 1977, her agent phoned Light to have her audition for an understudy role in the ABC soap opera One Life to Live. Not wanting to be attached to a soap opera or a sitcom, she initially rejected the idea, until she was told her daily salary would be $350. At the audition she realized that "the format reaches a lot of people". She could "make a difference" and "make money" at the same time. Instead of landing an understudy role, she was recast in the role of Karen Wolek, a role that had previously been portrayed by actresses Kathryn Breech and Julia Duffy. This role was quite lucrative for Light and spawned one of the show's most-remembered storylines; Light's character became an alcoholic prostitute after she became bored with her life as a housewife. On trial, Karen saved her friend Viki Lord Riley (Erika Slezak) from being convicted of killing Karen's pimp, Marco Dane (Gerald Anthony) by admitting to the entire town, including her faithful husband, Dr Larry Wolek (Michael Storm), that she had been a prostitute.

Light's portrayal of Karen brought the show critical acclaim and is credited with garnering One Life to Live ratings successes from the late 1970s into the early 1980s. Light's dramatic, confessional courtroom performance of a housewife-turned-prostitute on the witness stand is regarded as one of the most memorable moments in television by TV Guide. In 1980, this won Light her first Daytime Emmy Award for Outstanding Lead Actress in a Drama Series; the scene in which she confessed her guilt in court is held in such high esteem that it is still used in acting classes. Light recalled: "I was scared before those courtroom scenes. I was afraid to put myself out that much. With the agony of pulling it out piece by piece and having the prosecutor stick the knife in her gut, I couldn't help but let everything spew out of her." Light won another Daytime Emmy Award in the role in 1981.

She appeared in an episode of St. Elsewhere in its first season, called "Dog Day Hospital", in which she played a housewife who became pregnant for the ninth time even though her husband claimed he had had a vasectomy. In an effort to punish the doctor who botched the job she took an operating room hostage though it was later revealed that her husband had not had the procedure.

=== Continued success and film expansion ===
After her success on daytime television, Light landed the leading role of assertive advertising executive Angela Bower on the ABC sitcom Who's the Boss?. Co-starring Tony Danza, who played her housekeeper (and eventual boyfriend), the show ran for eight seasons from 1984 to 1992. The series was successful in the ratings, consistently ranked in the top ten in the final primetime ratings between the years of 1985 and 1989, and has since continued in syndication. TV Guide ranked Who's the Boss? as the 109th best sitcom of all time. Along with her work in Who's the Boss?, she starred in several television films, including Stamp of a Killer (1987) alongside Jimmy Smits; and the critically acclaimed biographical drama The Ryan White Story (1989), in which she played the mother of HIV/AIDS positive teenager Ryan White.

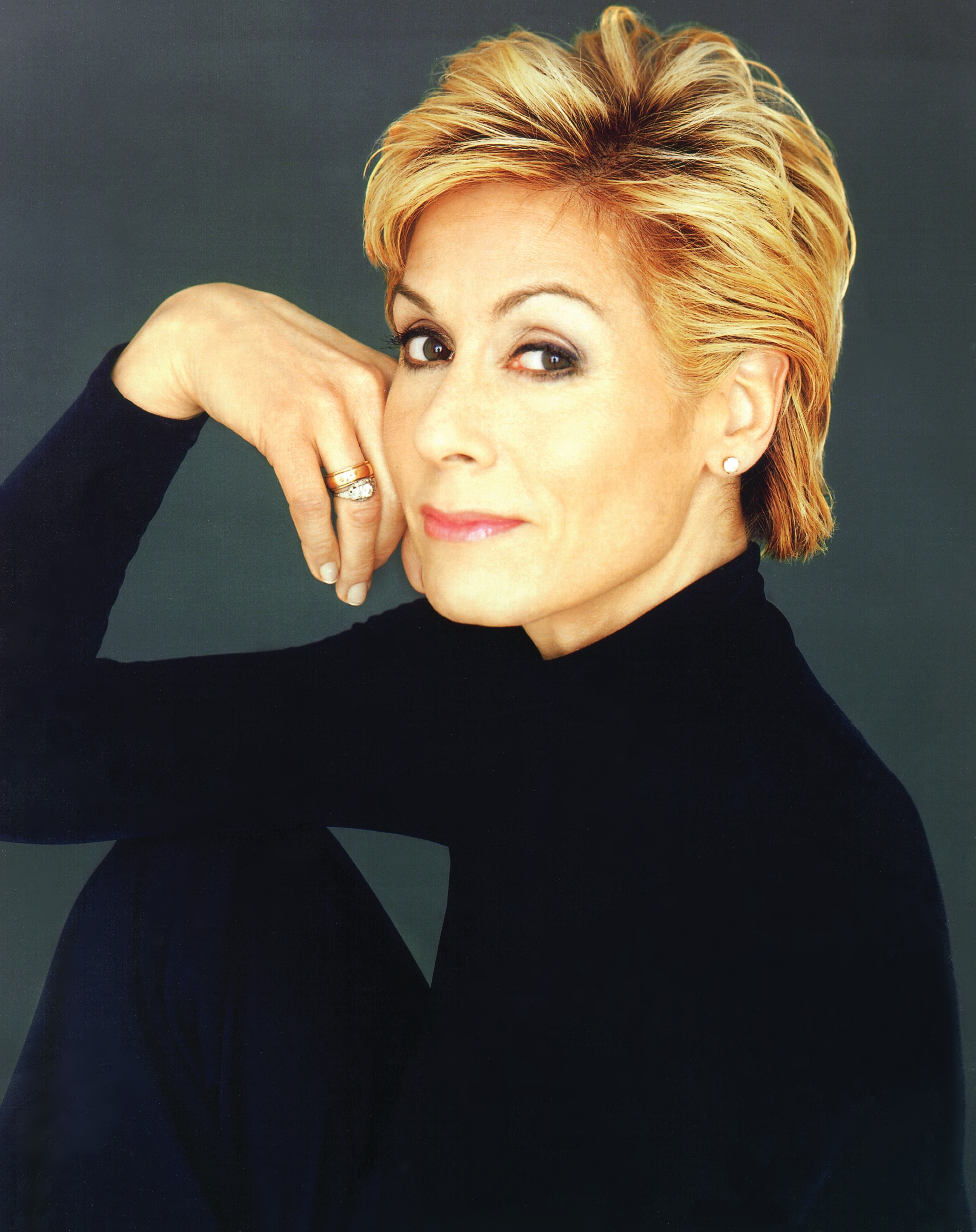
Light in 2007

Light appeared in Wife, Mother, Murderer (1991), in which she played Audrey Marie Hilley. After Who's the Boss?, Light starred in another ABC sitcom, Phenom, which ran for one season, 1993–94, before being canceled. In 1998 she starred in another short-lived sitcom, The Simple Life on CBS. She spent most of the 1990s starring in made-for-TV and feature films including Men Don't Tell and 1997's Too Close to Home, which co-starred Ricky Schroder. In 1999, Light returned to the stage in the off-Broadway production of Pulitzer Prize-winning play Wit. She earned strong reviews for her portrayal of Vivian Bearing, a university professor battling ovarian cancer, and reprised the role for the national tour. Light shaved her head for the role in the play.

Light returned to television with the recurring role of Judge Elizabeth Donnelly in the NBC legal crime drama Law & Order: Special Victims Unit in 2002. She appeared in 25 episodes of the series from 2002 to 2010. In 2004 she starred in another short-lived CBS sitcom, The Stones. In 2006, Light joined the cast of the ABC comedy-drama series Ugly Betty as Claire Meade, the mother of Alexis and Daniel. She was a recurring guest-star during the first season and was promoted to series regular as of the second. Light appeared in the show until the series finale in 2010. She was nominated for the Primetime Emmy Award for Outstanding Guest Actress in a Comedy Series in 2007, and for the Screen Actors Guild Award for Outstanding Performance by an Ensemble in a Comedy Series in 2008, for her performance in show.

Light appeared in a number of films in the 2000s. She co-starred opposite Chris Messina and Jennifer Westfeldt in the 2006 romantic comedy film Ira & Abby. In 2007, Light starred as a radical Christian woman in the independent film Save Me. Light's character, Gayle, runs a Christian ministry known as Genesis House, which works to help gay men recover from their 'affliction.' She is challenged by the arrival of Mark, an ill gay man who reminds Gayle of her dead, homosexual son, and the movie chronicles the challenges of the two as they learn to accept each other as they are.

=== Acclaim in theater and return to television ===
The New York Times said in 1999 of Light's lead performance in the Broadway play Wit, "It is the sort of transformational work that would hint at other future successes, with Shakespeare, maybe, if a full-time career in the theater were truly an option these days. In any event, it gives rise to a wish. Ms. Light, don't touch that dial again, at least not for a while." Nevertheless, it would be another decade before Light returned to a major theatrical role on Broadway. From 2010 to 2011, Light appeared on Broadway as witty alcoholic Marie Lombardi in the play Lombardi, for which she received a nomination for the Tony Award, for Best Performance by an Actress in a Featured Role in a Play. Another role on Broadway followed, as Silda Grauman in Other Desert Cities from 2011 to 2012, which garnered Light her first Tony Award for Featured Actress in a Play and the 2012 Drama Desk Award for Outstanding Featured Actress in a Play. Light also starred in two television pilots, ABC's sitcom Other People's Kids and USA Network's drama Eden, both in 2011 and neither of which were green-lit to continue.

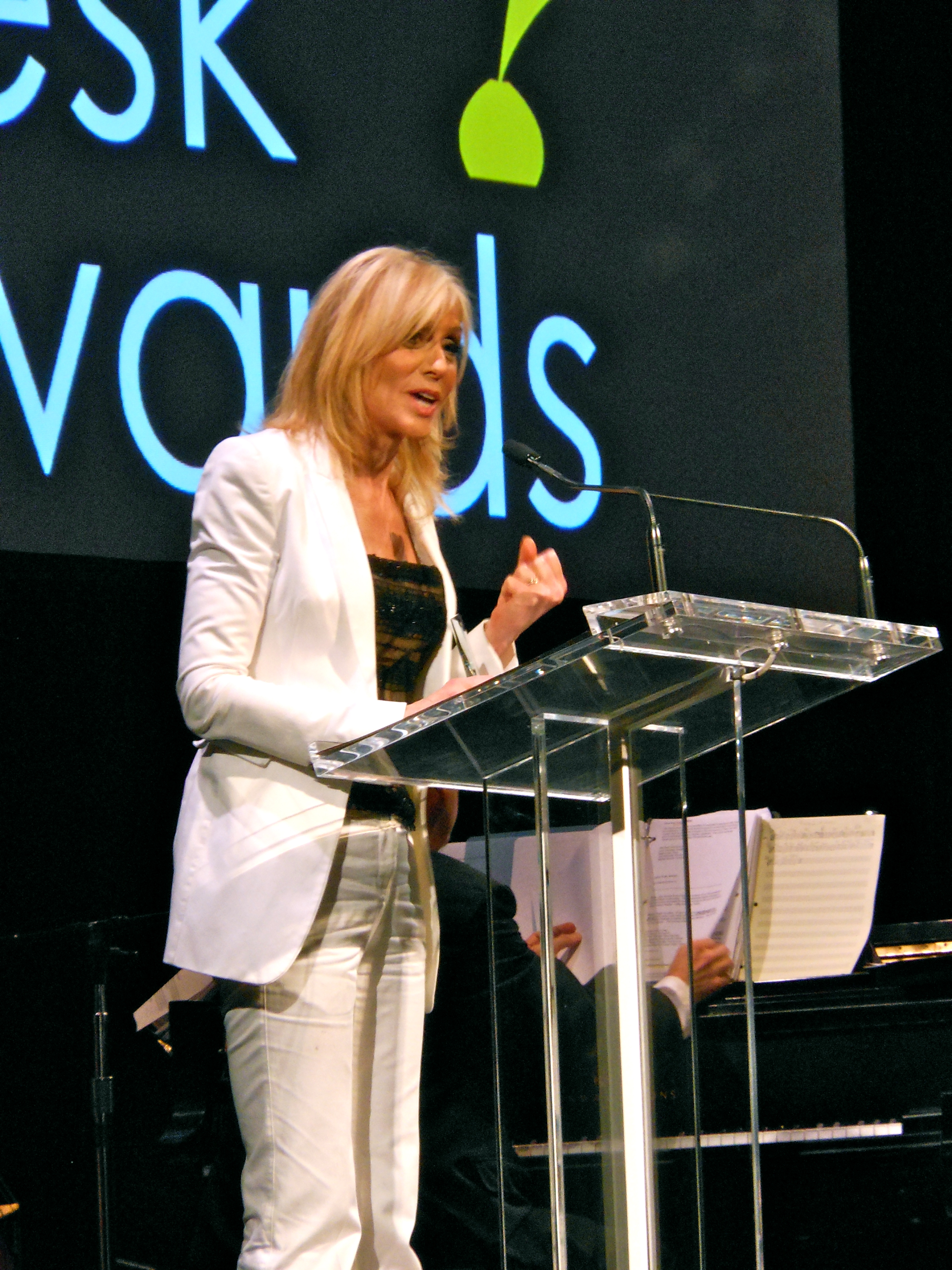
Judith Light accepting her 2012 Drama Desk Award at The Town Hall in New York City

Light appeared on Broadway as Faye in the 2013 play, The Assembled Parties, and won her second Tony Award for Featured Actress in a Play for her performance. In the same year, she joined the cast of TNT's continuation of the television series Dallas, in the role of Judith Brown Ryland, villainous mother of Harris Ryland (despite being only three years older than Mitch Pileggi who plays her TV son). She received positive reviews for her recurring role in Dallas, with Entertainment Weekly naming her the "scene-stealer" of the series.

In 2014, she was cast opposite Jeffrey Tambor in the critically acclaimed Amazon Studios dark comedy-drama series, Transparent created by Joey Soloway. She plays Shelly Pfefferman, ex-wife of the transgender character played by Tambor. The pilot episode debuted on February 6, 2014, and later episodes premiered on September 26, 2014. Light received Critics' Choice Television Award for Best Supporting Actress in a Comedy Series and Golden Globe Award for Best Supporting Actress – Series, Miniseries or Television Film nominations for her performance.

Light appeared opposite Patricia Clarkson in the 2014 rom-com, Last Weekend, and as the mother of Melanie Lynskey's character in a comedy-drama film, We'll Never Have Paris, the same year. She returned to Broadway in 2015 as Madame Raquin in Helen Edmundson's adaptation of Thérèse Raquin, starring opposite Keira Knightley and Matt Ryan. In 2017, Light was featured in the American Theatre Wing's Working in the Theatre series on solo performance.

Light received critical acclaim for her portrayal of Marilyn Miglin in 2018's The Assassination of Gianni Versace: American Crime Story, a mini-series on FX, culminating in a Primetime Emmy nomination for Outstanding Supporting Actress in a Limited Series or Movie. In 2019, Light guest-starred in the Netflix series, The Politician. Together with Bette Midler, she joined the main cast of the series for the second season, which premiered in June 2020. She received a star on the Hollywood Walk of Fame on September 12, 2019.

In 2021, Light played Rosa Stevens in the biographical musical drama film Tick, Tick... Boom! directed by Lin-Manuel Miranda. She later starred in the comedy-thriller The Menu. She also was cast in the comedy-drama Down Low, and comedy-drama The Young Wife starring Kiersey Clemons. On television, Light played Courteney Cox's mother in the Starz horror comedy series Shining Vale, and Blanche Knopf in the HBO Max series Julia, both having premiered in 2022.

In 2026, she appeared as the character of Ma Gnucci in the Disney+ special The Punisher: One Last Kill set in the Marvel Cinematic Universe.

== Personal life ==
Light has been married to television actor Robert Desiderio since 1985. In 2010, the couple became bicoastal: she lives primarily in New York City, and he resides primarily in Southern California. She has a home in Beverly Hills, California and a home in Aspen, Colorado. She is Jewish and considers herself religious, without being attached to institutional religion. She has practiced Kundalini yoga for 20 years.

== Activism ==
After being inspired by the community, Light began advocating for people diagnosed with HIV/AIDS in the early 1980s. She was one of the first celebrities to advocate against the social stigma encountered by those with AIDS. She has served on the boards of the Matthew Shepard Foundation and the Point Foundation, a support organization for students discriminated against based on sexual orientation or gender.

Through her role in Transparent as the ex-wife of a transgender person, Light raises these issues to a broad audience. She reported "It's something that we really haven't talked about before in pop culture, we haven't talked about transgender issues, we haven't talked about mature people's sexuality."

In an interview with the magazine Out, Light stated:

“It was the LGBTQ community that inspired me to be the kind of person I wanted to be. I wanted to be authentic and courageous, and for so long I wasn't. When I began doing a lot of advocacy work in the early '80s for HIV and AIDS, I saw the community and the way the community was operating against all odds, against a world and a culture and country that gave them nothing and denigrated them. ... I looked at this community and said, 'This is breathtaking. This is the kind of world and people I want to be around. These are the kind of people I want to be working with."

In 2018, Light discussed the similarities between the beginnings of the LGBT rights movement and the Me Too movement.

In addition to LGBTQ and AIDS activism, she has spoken publicly to encourage vaccination against the flu as a way to protect vulnerable populations.

== Filmography ==
=== Film ===
Year	Title	Role	Notes
1978	Rush It	Catherine's Friend	
1996	Paul Monette: The Brink of Summer's End	Herself	
1996	A Step Toward Tomorrow	Anna Lerner	
2000	Joseph: King of Dreams	Zuleika	Voice
2005	Ira & Abby	Arlene Black	
2006	A Broken Sole	Hilary	
2007	Save Me	Gayle	Also producer
2012	Rhymes with Banana	Herself	
2012	Scrooge & Marley	The Narrator	
2014	Last Weekend	Veronika Goss	
2015	We'll Never Have Paris	Jean	
2015	Digging for Fire	Grandma	
2018	Ms. White Light	Val	
2018	Hot Air	Judith Montefiore-Salters	
2019	Before You Know It	Sherrell Ghearhardt	
2021	The Same Storm	Shirlee Salt	
2021	Tick, Tick... Boom!	Rosa Stevens	
2022	The Menu	Anne Liebrandt	
2023	Down Low	Sandy	
2023	The Young Wife	Cookie	
2024	Out of My Mind	Mrs. V.	
TBA	Untitled Stephen Merchant film		Filming

=== Television films ===
Year	Title	Role	Notes
1983	Intimate Agony	Marsha	
1987	Stamp of a Killer	Cathy Proctor	
1989	The Ryan White Story	Jeanne White	
1989	My Boyfriend's Back	Vickie Vine	
1990	In Defense of a Married Man	Laura Simmons	
1991	Wife, Mother, Murderer	Marie Hilley/Robbi/Teri	
1993	Men Don't Tell	Laura MacAffrey	
1994	Betrayal of Trust	Barbara Noël	
1994	Against Their Will: Women in Prison	Alice Needham	
1995	Lady Killer	Janice Mitchell	
1996	A Strange Affair	Lisa McKeever	Also co-executive producer
1996	Murder at My Door	Irene McNair	
1997	Too Close to Home	Diana Donahue	
2019	Escaping the Madhouse: The Nellie Bly Story	Matron Grady	
2026	The Punisher: One Last Kill	Ma Gnucci	Disney+ special

=== Television series ===
Year	Title	Role	Notes
1977	Kojak	Laetitia Pomerantz	Episode: "Monkey on a String"
1977–83	One Life to Live	Karen Wolek	Lead role
1983	St. Elsewhere	Barbara Lonnicker	Episode: "Dog Day Hospital"
1983	Family Ties	Stacey Hughes	Episode: "Not an Affair to Remember"
1984	The Mississippi	—N/a	Episode: "Home Again"
1984	Remington Steele	Clarissa Custer	Episode: "Dreams of Steele"
1984	You Are the Jury	Elizabeth Harding	Episode: "The Case of the People of Florida vs. Joseph Landrum"
1984–92	Who's the Boss?	Angela Bower	196 episodes
1986	Charmed Lives	Angela Bower	Episode: "Pilot"
1993–94	Phenom	Dianne Doolan	22 episodes
1996–97	Duckman	Ursula Bacon "Honey" Chicken	3 episodes
1997	Cow and Chicken	Nurse	Voice, episode: "Space Cow/The Legend of Sailcat"
1998	The Simple Life	Sara Campbell	7 episodes
2001	Born In Brooklyn	Catherine	ABC pilot
2002	Spin City	Christine	Episode: "O Mother, Where Art Thou?"
2002–10	Law & Order: Special Victims Unit	Elizabeth Donnelly	25 episodes
2004	The Stones	Barbara Stone	9 episodes
2005	Sold	Nancy	ABC pilot
2006	Family Guy	Herself	Voice, episode: "The Griffin Family History"
2006	Twenty Good Years	Gina	3 episodes
2006–10	Ugly Betty	Claire Meade	55 episodes
2011	Nurse Jackie	Maureen Cooper	Episode: "Rat Falls"
2011	Other People's Kids	Laura	ABC pilot
2011	Eden	Olivia Sparks	USA pilot
2012–15	The Exes	Marjorie	3 episodes
2013–14	Dallas	Judith Brown Ryland	18 episodes
2014	Raising Hope	Louise	Episode: "Dinner with Tropes"
2014	Submissions Only	Sharon Duvall	Episode: "Reason to Stay"
2014	The Winklers	Tita Winkler	ABC pilot
2014–19	Transparent	Shelly Pfefferman	32 episodes
2017	Doubt	Carolyn Rice	8 episodes
2017	I'm Sorry	Judy	Episode: "Pilot"
2017	Penn Zero: Part-Time Hero	Mrs. Wright	Voice, episode: "My Mischievous Son"
2018	The Assassination of Gianni Versace: American Crime Story	Marilyn Miglin	2 episodes
2018	The Good Fight	Deidre Quinn	Episode: "Day 492"
2018–19	Queen America	Regina	3 episodes
2019–20	The Politician	Dede Standish	8 episodes
2020	Manhunt: Deadly Games	Bobi Jewell	7 episodes
2021	Impeachment: American Crime Story	Susan Carpenter-McMillan	5 episodes
2022	American Horror Stories	Virginia Mallow	Episode: "Facelift"
2022–23	Shining Vale	Joan	6 episodes
2022–23	Julia	Blanche Knopf	9 episodes
2023	Poker Face	Irene Smothers	Episode: "Time of the Monkey"
2024	Kite Man: Hell Yeah!	Helen Villigan	Voice; 6 episodes
2024	Before	Lynn	Miniseries
2025	Star Wars: Visions	Gleenu	Voice; episode: "The Smuggler"
2025	All's Fair	Sheila Baskin	2 episodes
2026	The Terror: Devil in Silver	Dorry	5 episodes

=== Theatre ===
Year	Title	Role	Notes
1975	A Doll's House	Helene	Vivian Beaumont Theater
1976	Measure for Measure	Francisca	Delacorte Theater
1976	Herzl	Julie Herzl	Palace Theatre
1999–2000	Wit	Vivian Bearing	Union Square Theatre
2001	Hedda Gabler	Hedda Gabler	Shakespeare Theatre Company
2002	Sorrows and Rejoicings	Allison Olivier	Second Stage Theatre
2005	Colder Than Here	Myra	Lucille Lortel Theatre
2010–11	Lombardi	Marie Lombardi	Circle in the Square Theatre
2011–12	Other Desert Cities	Silda Grauman	Booth Theatre
2013	The Assembled Parties	Faye	Samuel J. Friedman Theatre
2015	Thérèse Raquin	Madame Raquin	Roundabout Theater at Studio 54
2016	All The Ways To Say I Love You	Faye	MCC Theater
2017	God Looked Away	Estelle	Pasadena Playhouse

== Awards and nominations ==
=== Film and television ===
Year	Award	Category	Work	Result
1979	Soapy Award	Outstanding Actress	One Life to Live	Won
1980	Daytime Emmy Award	Outstanding Lead Actress in a Drama Series	One Life to Live	Won
1980	Soapy Award	Outstanding Actress	One Life to Live	Won
1981	Daytime Emmy Award	Outstanding Lead Actress in a Drama Series	One Life to Live	Won
1998	GLAAD Media Award	Vision Award		Honouree
2007	Primetime Emmy Award	Outstanding Guest Actress in a Comedy Series	Ugly Betty	Nominated
2007	Prism Award	Best Performance in a Comedy Series	Ugly Betty	Won
2007	Gold Derby Awards	Comedy Guest Actress	Ugly Betty	Nominated
2007	Gold Derby Awards	Ensemble of the Year	Ugly Betty	Nominated
2007	TV Land Award	Favorite Working Mom	Who's the Boss?	Nominated
2008	Screen Actors Guild Award	Outstanding Performance by an Ensemble in a Comedy Series	Ugly Betty	Nominated
2008	TV Land Award	Mad Ad Man (or Woman) of the Year	Who's the Boss?	Nominated
2015	Critics' Choice Television Award	Best Supporting Actress in a Comedy Series	Transparent	Nominated
2016	Golden Globe Award	Best Supporting Actress – Series, Miniseries or Television Film	Transparent	Nominated
2016	Primetime Emmy Award	Outstanding Supporting Actress in a Comedy Series	Transparent	Nominated
2016	Screen Actors Guild Award	Outstanding Performance by an Ensemble in a Comedy Series	Transparent	Nominated
2016	Critics' Choice Television Award	Best Supporting Actress in a Comedy Series	Transparent	Nominated
2016	Gold Derby Awards	Comedy Supporting Actress	Transparent	Nominated
2016	Gotham Award	Made in New York Award		Honouree
2017	Primetime Emmy Award	Outstanding Supporting Actress in a Comedy Series	Transparent	Nominated
2017	Gold Derby Awards	Comedy Supporting Actress	Transparent	Nominated
2018	Primetime Emmy Award	Outstanding Supporting Actress in a Limited Series or Movie	The Assassination of Gianni Versace: American Crime Story	Nominated
2018	Gold Derby Awards	Movie/Limited Series Supporting Actress	The Assassination of Gianni Versace: American Crime Story	Won
2018	Gold Derby Awards	Ensemble of the Year	The Assassination of Gianni Versace: American Crime Story	Nominated
2019	Critics' Choice Television Award	Best Supporting Actress in a Movie/Miniseries	The Assassination of Gianni Versace: American Crime Story	Nominated
2019	Provincetown International Film Festival	Excellence in Acting Award		Honouree
2020	Women's Image Network Awards	Outstanding Actress Made for Television Movie / Mini-Series	Escaping the Madhouse: The Nellie Bly Story	Nominated
2020	GLAAD Media Award	Excellence in Media Award		Honouree
2023	Primetime Emmy Award	Outstanding Guest Actress in a Comedy Series	Poker Face (for "Time of the Monkey")	Won

=== Theatre ===
Year	Award	Category	Work	Result
2011	Tony Award	Best Featured Actress in a Play	Lombardi	Nominated
2011	Drama Desk Award	Outstanding Featured Actress in a Play	Lombardi	Nominated
2011	Outer Critics Circle Award	Outstanding Actress in a Play	Lombardi	Nominated
2012	Tony Award	Best Featured Actress in a Play	Other Desert Cities	Won
2012	Drama Desk Award	Outstanding Featured Actress in a Play	Other Desert Cities	Won
2012	Outer Critics Circle Award	Outstanding Featured Actress in a Play	Other Desert Cities	Nominated
2013	Tony Award	Best Featured Actress in a Play	The Assembled Parties	Won
2013	Drama Desk Award	Outstanding Featured Actress in a Play	The Assembled Parties	Won
2013	Outer Critics Circle Award	Outstanding Featured Actress in a Play	The Assembled Parties	Nominated
2016	Drama League Award	Distinguished Performance	Thérèse Raquin	Nominated
2016	Outer Critics Circle Award	Outstanding Featured Actress in a Play	Thérèse Raquin	Won
2017	Drama League Award	Distinguished Performance	All The Ways To Say I Love You	Nominated
2017	Outer Critics Circle Award	Outstanding Solo Performance	All The Ways To Say I Love You	Nominated
2019	Tony Award	Isabelle Stevenson Award	"Advocacy for LGBTQ+ rights and the fight against HIV/AIDS."	Honouree
