= Drama Desk Award for Outstanding Featured Actress in a Play =

American theatre award

Drama Desk Award for Outstanding Featured Actress
- Awarded for: Outstanding Featured Actress in a Play
- Location: New York City
- Country: United States
- Presented by: Drama Desk
- First award: 1975
- Final award: 2022
- Website: dramadesk.org (defunct)

The Drama Desk Award for Outstanding Featured Actress in a Play was an annual award presented by Drama Desk in recognition of achievements in the theatre across collective Broadway, off-Broadway and off-off-Broadway productions in New York City. The award was one of eight new acting awards first presented in 1975, when Drama Desk retired an earlier award that had made no distinction between work in plays and musicals, nor between actors and actresses, nor between lead performers and featured performers.

After the 2022 ceremony, all eight acting categories introduced in 1975 were retired. The award for Outstanding Featured Actress in a Play, along with Outstanding Featured Actor in a Play, were replaced in 2023 with the gender neutral category of Outstanding Featured Performance in a Play.

== Winners and nominees ==
Key

and bold indicates the winner.

=== 1970s ===
Year	Actress	Play	Character
1975
1975	**Frances Sternhagen**	**Equus**	**Dora Strang**
1975	Polly Adams	London Assurance	Grace Harkaway
1975	Maureen Anderman	Seascape	Sarah
1975	Caroline Lagerfelt	The Constant Wife	Marie-Louise Durham
1975	Carole Shelley	Absurd Person Singular	Jane
1975	Elizabeth Spriggs	London Assurance	Lady Gay Spanker
1975	Marcia Wallace	Avon Lady	Avon Lady
1976
1976	**Rachel Roberts**	**Habeas Corpus**	**Mrs. Wicksteed**
1976	Toni Darnay	The Heiress	Mrs. Montgomery
1976	Alice Drummond	A Memory of Two Mondays	Agnes
1976	June Havoc	Habeas Corpus	Mrs. Swabb
1976	Kaiulani Lee	Kennedy's Children	Rona
1976	Lynn Ann Leveridge	Yentl	Hadass
1977
1977	**Rosemary De Angelis**	**The Transfiguration of Benno Blimpie**	**Mother**
1977	Joyce Ebert	The Shadow Box	Maggie
1977	Rose Gregorio	The Shadow Box	Agnes
1977	Cecilia Hart	Dirty Linen	Maddie
1977	Patricia Roe	The Oldest Living Graduate	Maureen Kinkaid
1977	Meryl Streep	The Cherry Orchard	Dunyasha
1977	Gretchen Wyler	Sly Fox	Miss Fancy
1978
1978	**Eileen Atkins**	**The Night of the Tribades**	**Marie Caroline David**
1978	Martha Gaylord	The Elusive Angel	Bo-Peep Braxton
1978	Carol Kane	The Effect of Gamma Rays	Matilda "Tillie" Hunsdorfer
1978	Swoosie Kurtz	Uncommon Women and Others	Rita Altabel
1978	Pamela Reed	Curse of the Starving Class	Emma
1979
1979	**Pamela Reed**	**Getting Out**	**Arlie**
1979	Dixie Carter	Fathers and Sons	Martha "Calamity Jane" Canary
1979	Frances Foster	Nevis Mountain Dew	Everalda Philibert Griffin
1979	Joan Hickson	Bedroom Farce	Delia
1979	Laurie Kennedy	Man and Superman	Violet Robinson
1979	Susan Littler	Bedroom Farce	Kate

=== 1980s ===
Year	Actress	Play	Character
1980
1980	**Lois de Banzie**	**Morning's at Seven**	**Myrtle Brown**
1980	Pamela Brook	Goodbye Fidel	Peggy Sinclair
1980	Frances Conroy	Othello	Desdemona
1980	Mia Dillon	Once a Catholic	Mary Mooney
1980	Dianne Wiest	The Art of Dining	Elizabeth Barrow Colt
1981
1981	**Swoosie Kurtz**	**Fifth of July**	**Gwen Landis**
1981	Fran Brill	Knuckle	Jenny
1981	Carrie Nye	The Man Who Came to Dinner	Lorraine Sheldon
1981	Jean Smart	Last Summer at Bluefish Cove	Lil
1981	Jessica Tandy	Rose	Rose's Mother
1981	Zoë Wanamaker	Piaf	Tione
1982
1982	**Amanda Plummer**	**Agnes of God**	**Agnes**
1982	Pauline Flanagan	Medea	The First Woman of Corinth
1982	Estelle Getty	Torch Song Trilogy	Mrs. Beckoff
1982	Cheryl Giannini	Grown Ups	Louise
1982	E. Katherine Kerr	Cloud Nine	Ellen / Mrs. Saunders
1982	Aideen O'Kelly	Othello	Emilia
1983
1983	**Judith Ivey**	**Steaming**	**Josie**
1983	Maureen Anderman	You Can't Take It with You	Alice Sycamore
1983	Dana Ivey	Present Laughter	Monica Reed
1983	Dana Ivey	Quartermaine's Terms	Melanie Garth
1983	Kate McGregor-Stewart	Beyond Therapy	Charlotte
1983	Anne Twomey	Vieux Carré	Jane
1984
1984	**Christine Baranski**	**The Real Thing**	**Charlotte**
1984	Lisa Banes	Isn't it Romantic	Harriet Cornwall
1984	Dody Goodman	Ah, Wilderness!	Essie Miller
1984	Jo Henderson	Isn't it Romantic	Lillian Cornwall
1984	Amy Irving	Heartbreak House	Ellie Dunn
1984	Dianne Wiest	Serenading Louie	Gabby
1984	Dianne Wiest	Other Places	Deborah
1985
1985	**Judith Ivey**	**Hurlyburly**	**Bonnie**
1985	Sudie Bond	The Foreigner	Betty Meeks
1985	Joanna Gleason	A Day in the Death of Joe Egg	Pam
1985	Nancy Marchand	The Octette Bridge Club	Connie Emerson
1985	Anne Pitoniak	The Octette Bridge Club	Martha McDermitt
1985	Margaret Tyzack	Tom and Viv	Rose Robinson Haigh-Wood
1986
1986	**Joanna Gleason**	**Social Security**	**Trudy Heyman**
1986	**Joanna Gleason**	**It's Only a Play**	**Virginia Noyes**
1986	Elizabeth Berridge	Cruise Control	Suze
1986	Elizabeth Berridge	Wrestlers	Angie
1986	Kathryn Grody	The Marriage of Bette and Boo	Emily Brennan
1986	Zoë Wanamaker	Loot	Fay
1986	Ann Wedgeworth	A Lie of the Mind	Meg
1987
1987	**Mary Alice**	**Fences**	**Rose Maxson**
1987	Suzanne Burden	Dangerous Liaisons	Madame de Tourvel
1987	Jane Carr	The Life and Adventures of Nicholas Nickleby	Various Characters
1987	Janet Eilber	Stepping Out	Andy
1987	Christine Estabrook	North Shore Fish	Florence Rizzo
1987	Vickilyn Reynolds	The Colored Museum	Lawanda / Mama
1988
1988	**Christine Estabrook**	**The Boys Next Door**	**Sheila**
1988	Kimberleigh Aarn	Joe Turner's Come and Gone	Mattie Cambell
1988	Frances McDormand	A Streetcar Named Desire	Stella Kowalski
1988	Kimberly Scott	Joe Turner's Come and Gone	Molly Cunningham
1989
1989	**Tovah Feldshuh**	**Lend Me a Tenor**	**Maria Merelli**
1989	Joanne Camp	The Heidi Chronicles	Fran / Molly / Betsy / April
1989	Margaret Colin	Aristocrats	Alice
1989	Penelope Ann Miller	Our Town	Emily Webb
1989	Alice Playten	Spoils of War	Emma
1989	Holland Taylor	The Cocktail Hour	Nina

=== 1990s ===
Year	Actress	Play	Character
1990
1990	**Frances Conroy**	**The Secret Rapture**	**Marion French**
1990	Jayne Atkinson	The Art of Success	Sarah Sprackling
1990	Kate Burton	Some Americans Abroad	Betty McNeil
1990	Marcia Jean Kurtz	When She Danced	Miss Belzer
1990	Stephanie Roth	Artist Descending a Staircase	Sophie
1991
1991	**Irene Worth**	**Lost in Yonkers**	**Grandma Kurnitz**
1991	Jane Adams	I Hate Hamlet	Deirdre McDavey
1991	Tracey Ellis	Our Country's Good	Lieutenant George Johnston
1991	Julie Halston	Red Scare on Sunset	Pat Pilford
1991	Deirdre O'Connell	Love and Anger	Sarah Downey
1992
1992	**Christine Baranski**	**Lips Together, Teeth Apart**	**Chloe Haddock**
1992	Lisa Emery	Marvin's Room	Lee
1992	Harriet Harris	Bella, Bell of Byelorussia	Ludmilla / Waitress
1992	Laura Linney	Sight Unseen	Grete
1992	Nancy Marchand	The End of the Day	Rosamund Brackett / Jocelyn Massey
1993
1993	**Madeline Kahn**	**The Sisters Rosensweig**	**Gorgeous Teitlebaum**
1993	Kathleen Chalfant	Angels in America: Millennium Approaches	Various Characters
1993	Marcia Gay Harden	Angels in America: Millennium Approaches	Various Characters
1993	Harriet Harris	Jeffrey	Ann Marwood Bartle
1993	Kathryn Meisle	As You Like It	Rosalind
1994
1994	**Jane Adams**	**An Inspector Calls**	**Sheila Biring**
1994	Frances Conroy	In the Summer House	Mrs. Constable
1994	Hope Davis	Pterodactyls	Emma
1994	Marcia Gay Harden	Angels in America: Perestroika	Various Characters
1994	Kristen Johnston	The Lights	Rose
1995
1995	**Tara Fitzgerald**	**Hamlet**	**Ophelia**
1995	Hallie Foote	The Horton Foote Plays	Performer
1995	Penny Fuller	Three Viewings	Virginia
1995	Camryn Manheim	Missing Persons	Gemma
1995	J. Smith-Cameron	The Naked Truth	Sissy Bermiss Darnley
1995	Sheila Tousey	Iphigenia and Other Daughters	Electra
1996
1996	**Elaine Stritch**	**A Delicate Balance**	**Claire**
1996	Viola Davis	Seven Guitars	Vera
1996	Eileen Heckart	Northeast Local	Mair
1996	Donna Murphy	Twelve Dreams	Dorothy Trowbridge
1996	Roberta Wallach	The Model Apartment	Debby
1996	Amy Wright	Mrs. Klein	Paula
1997
1997	**Dana Ivey**	**Sex and Longing**	**Bridget McCrea**
1997	**Dana Ivey**	**The Last Night of Ballyhoo**	**Boo Levy**
1997	Kathleen Chalfant	Nine Armenians	Marie
1997	Linda Emond	Nine Armenians	Armine
1997	Melissa Errico	The Importance of Being Earnest	Gwendolen Fairfax
1997	Allison Janney	Present Laughter	Liz
1997	Celia Weston	The Last Night of Ballyhoo	Aunt Reba
1998
1998	**Allison Janney**	**A View from the Bridge**	**Beatrice Carbone**
1998	Patricia Clarkson	The Maiden's Prayer	Libby
1998	Linda Lavin	The Diary of Anne Frank	Mrs. Van Daan
1998	Patti LuPone	The Old Neighborhood	Jolly
1998	Marian Seldes	Ivanov	Zinaida Savishna
1998	Carolyn Seymour	Goose-Pimples	Jackie
1999
1999	**Anna Friel**	**Closer**	**Alice Ayers**
1999	Viola Davis	Everybody's Ruby	Ruby McCollum
1999	Kristine Nielsen	Betty's Summer Vacation	Mrs. Siezmagraff
1999	Natasha Richardson	Closer	Anna
1999	Marian Seldes	Ring Round the Moon	Madame Desmermortes
1999	Mary Louise Wilson	Bosoms and Neglect	Henny

=== 2000s ===
Year	Actress	Play	Character
2000
2000	**Marylouise Burke**	**Fuddy Meers**	**Gertie**
2000	Jillian Armenante	The Cider House Rules, Part One	Melony
2000	Seana Kofoed	An Experiment with an Air Pump	Isobel Bridie
2000	Phyllis Newman	The Moment When	Paula
2000	Çiğdem Onat	The Time of the Cuckoo	Signora Fioria
2000	Amy Sedaris	The Country Club	Froggy
2001
2001	**Viola Davis**	**King Hedley II**	**Tonya**
2001	Anita Durst	The Bitter Tears of Petra von Kant	Marlene
2001	Barbara Jefford	Coriolanus	Volumnia
2001	Marthe Keller	Judgment at Nuremberg	Mrs. Bertholt
2001	Marian Seldes	The Butterfly Collection	Margaret
2001	Robin Weigert	Madame Melville	Ruth
2002
2002	**Katie Finneran**	**Noises Off**	**Brooke Ashton**
2002	Jennifer Coolidge	The Women	Edith / Mrs. Phelps Potter
2002	Kathleen Doyle	Kilt	Mary
2002	Linda Emond	Homebody/Kabul	The Homebody
2002	Elizabeth Franz	Morning's at Seven	Aaronetta Gibbs
2002	Kathleen Widdoes	Franny's Way	Marjorie
2003
2003	**Lynn Redgrave**	**Talking Heads**	**Miss Fozzard**
2003	Christine Ebersole	Talking Heads	Irene
2003	Jan Maxwell	My Old Lady	Chloe Giffard
2003	Helen McCrory	Uncle Vanya	Elena
2003	Nancy Opel	Polish Joke	Various Characters
2003	Jeanine Serralles	Hold Please	Jessica
2004
2004	**Audra McDonald**	**A Raisin in the Sun**	**Ruth Younger**
2004	Jayne Houdyshell	Well	Ann Kron
2004	Mikel Sarah Lambert	The Daughter-in-Law	Mrs. Gascoyne
2004	Margo Martindale	Cat on a Hot Tin Roof	Big Mama
2004	Jan Maxwell	Sixteen Wounded	Sonya
2004	Mary Louise Wilson	The Beard of Avon	Queen Elizabeth I
2005
2005	**Adriane Lenox**	**Doubt**	**Mrs. Miller**
2005	Julie Halston	White Chocolate	Vivian Beale Somerset
2005	Portia	McReele	Opal
2005	Lily Rabe	Steel Magnolias	Annelle
2005	Lee Roy Rogers	Orson's Shadow	Vivien Leigh
2005	Mary Testa	String of Pearls	Various Characters
2006
2006	**Frances de la Tour**	**The History Boys**	**Mrs. Lintott**
2006	Lisa Emery	Abigail's Party	Susan
2006	Judith Hawking	A Soldier's Wife	Florence
2006	Michele Pawk	The Paris Letter	Katie
2006	Lynn Redgrave	The Constant Wife	Mrs. Culver
2006	Marian Seldes	Dedication or The Stuff of Dreams	Annabelle Willard
2007
2007	**Martha Plimpton**	**The Coast of Utopia**	**Various Characters**
2007	Myriam Acharki	Woyzeck	Marie
2007	Xanthe Elbrick	Coram Boy	Alexander Ashbrook / Aaron
2007	Sarah Nina Hayon	Rearviewmirror	Inez
2007	Jan Maxwell	Coram Boy	Mrs. Lynch
2007	Rita Wolf	The American Pilot	Sarah
2008
2008	**Linda Lavin**	**The New Century**	**Helene Nadler**
2008	Elizabeth Ashley	Dividing the Estate	Stella
2008	Johanna Day	Peter and Jerry	Ann
2008	Zoe Kazan	100 Saints You Should Know	Abby
2008	Rondi Reed	August: Osage County	Mattie Fae Aiken
2008	Marisa Tomei	Top Girls	Isabella Bird / Joyce / Mrs. Kidd
2009
2009	**Angela Lansbury**	**Blithe Spirit**	**Madame Arcati**
2009	Rebecca Hall	The Cherry Orchard	Varya
2009	Zoe Kazan	The Seagull	Masha
2009	Andrea Martin	Exit the King	Juliette
2009	Carey Mulligan	The Seagull	Nina
2009	Condola Rashad	Ruined	Sophie

=== 2010s ===
Year	Actress	Play	Character
2010
2010	**Viola Davis**	**Fences**	**Rose Maxson**
2010	Victoria Clark	When the Rain Stops Falling	Older Gabrielle York
2010	Xanthe Elbrick	Candida	Proserpine Garnett
2010	Mary Beth Hurt	When the Rain Stops Falling	Older Elizabeth Law
2010	Scarlett Johansson	A View from the Bridge	Catherine Carbone
2010	Andrea Riseborough	The Pride	Sylvia
2011
2011	**Edie Falco**	**The House of Blue Leaves**	**Bananas Shaughnessy**
2011	Lisa Emery	The Collection and A Kind of Alaska	Deborah
2011	Julie Halston	The Divine Sister	Sister Acacius
2011	Sarah Nina Hayon	A Bright New Boise	Anna
2011	Celia Keenan-Bolger	Peter and the Starcatcher	Molly
2011	Linda Lavin	Other Desert Cities	Silda Grauman
2011	Judith Light	Lombardi	Marie Lombardi
2012
2012	**Judith Light**	**Other Desert Cities**	**Silda Grauman**
2012	Stephanie J. Block	By the Way, Meet Vera Stark	Gloria Mitchell
2012	Anna Camp	All New People	Kim
2012	Kimberly Hebert Gregory	By the Way, Meet Vera Stark	Lottie
2012	Lisa Joyce	The Ugly One	Fanny
2012	Joaquina Kalukango	Hurt Village	Cookie
2012	Angela Lansbury	The Best Man	Sue Ellen Gamadge
2013
2013	**Judith Light**	**The Assembled Parties**	**Faye**
2013	Tasha Lawrence	The Whale	Mary
2013	Kellie Overbey	Sleeping Rough	Joanna
2013	Maryann Plunkett	Sorry	Barbara Apple
2013	Condola Rashad	The Trip to Bountiful	Thelma
2013	Laila Robins	Sorry	Marian Apple
2014
2014	**Celia Keenan-Bolger**	**The Glass Menagerie**	**Laura Wingfield**
2014	Betty Buckley	The Old Friends	Gertrude Hayhurst Sylvester Ratliff
2014	Julia Coffey	London Wall	Miss Janus
2014	Diane Davis	The Model Apartment	Debby
2014	Jan Maxwell	The Castle	Skinner
2014	Sophie Okonedo	A Raisin in the Sun	Ruth Younger
2015
2015	**Annaleigh Ashford**	**You Can't Take It with You**	**Essie Carmichael**
2015	Beth Dixon	The City of Conversation	Jean Swift
2015	Julie Halston	You Can't Take It with You	Gay Wellington
2015	Paola Lázaro-Muñoz	To the Bone	Lupe
2015	Lydia Leonard	Wolf Hall Parts One & Two	Anne Boleyn
2015	Julie White	Airline Highway	Tanya
2016
2016	**Saycon Sengbloh**	**Eclipsed**	**Helena**
2016	Brooke Bloom	Cloud 9	Edward / Betty
2016	Megan Hilty	Noises Off	Brooke Ashton
2016	Kellie Overbey	Women Without Men	Miss Connor
2016	Jeanine Serralles	Gloria	Gloria
2017
2017	**Cynthia Nixon**	**The Little Foxes**	**Birdie Hubbard**
2017	Jayne Houdyshell	A Doll's House, Part 2	Anne-Marie
2017	Randy Graff	The Babylon Line	Frieda Cohen
2017	Marie Mullen	The Beauty Queen of Leenane	Mag Folan
2017	Emily Skinner	Picnic	Rosemary
2017	Kate Walsh	If I Forget	Holly
2018
2018	**Jamie Brewer**	**Amy and the Orphans**	**Amy**
2018	Jocelyn Bioh	In the Blood	The Welfare Lady
2018	Barbara Marten	People, Places and Things	Doctor and Mum
2018	Deirdre O'Connell	Fulfillment Center	Suzan
2018	Constance Shulman	Bobbie Clearly	Darla London
2019
2019	**Celia Keenan-Bolger**	**To Kill a Mockingbird**	**Scout Finch**
2019	Harriett D. Foy	The House That Will Not Stand	Makeda
2019	Megan Hill	Eddie and Dave	Dave
2019	Ruth Wilson	King Lear	Cordelia / Fool
2019	Alison Wright	Othello	Emilia

=== 2020s ===
Year	Actress	Play	Character
2020
2020	**Lois Smith**	**The Inheritance**	**Margaret**
2020	Patrice Johnson Chevannes	runboyrun & In Old Age	Abasiama Ufot
2020	Belange Rodríguez	The Brief Wondrous Life of Oscar Wao	Ybón
2020	Kristina Poe	Halfway Bitches Go Straight to Heaven	Betty Woods
2020	Elizabeth Rodriguez	Halfway Bitches Go Straight to Heaven	Miss Rivera
2021	No awards: New York theatres shuttered, March 2020 to September 2021, due to the COVID-19 pandemic in New York City		
2022
2022	**Francis Benhamou**	**Prayer for the French Republic**	**Elodie**
2022	Stephanie Berry	On Sugarland	Evelyn
2022	Sonnie Brown	what you are now	Chantrea
2022	Page Leong	Out of Time	Woman
2022	Kenita R. Miller	for colored girls who have considered suicide / when the rainbow is enuf	Lady in Red
2022	Kara Young	Clyde's	Letitia

== Multiple Wins ==
2 wins

- Christine Baranski
- Viola Davis
- Judith Ivey
- Judith Light
- Celia Keenan-Bolger

== Facts ==
- Mary Alice and Viola Davis are the only two women who have won for playing the same character, Rose Maxson, from Fences
