= Gaye Su Akyol =

Turkish singer, painter and anthropologist (born 1985)

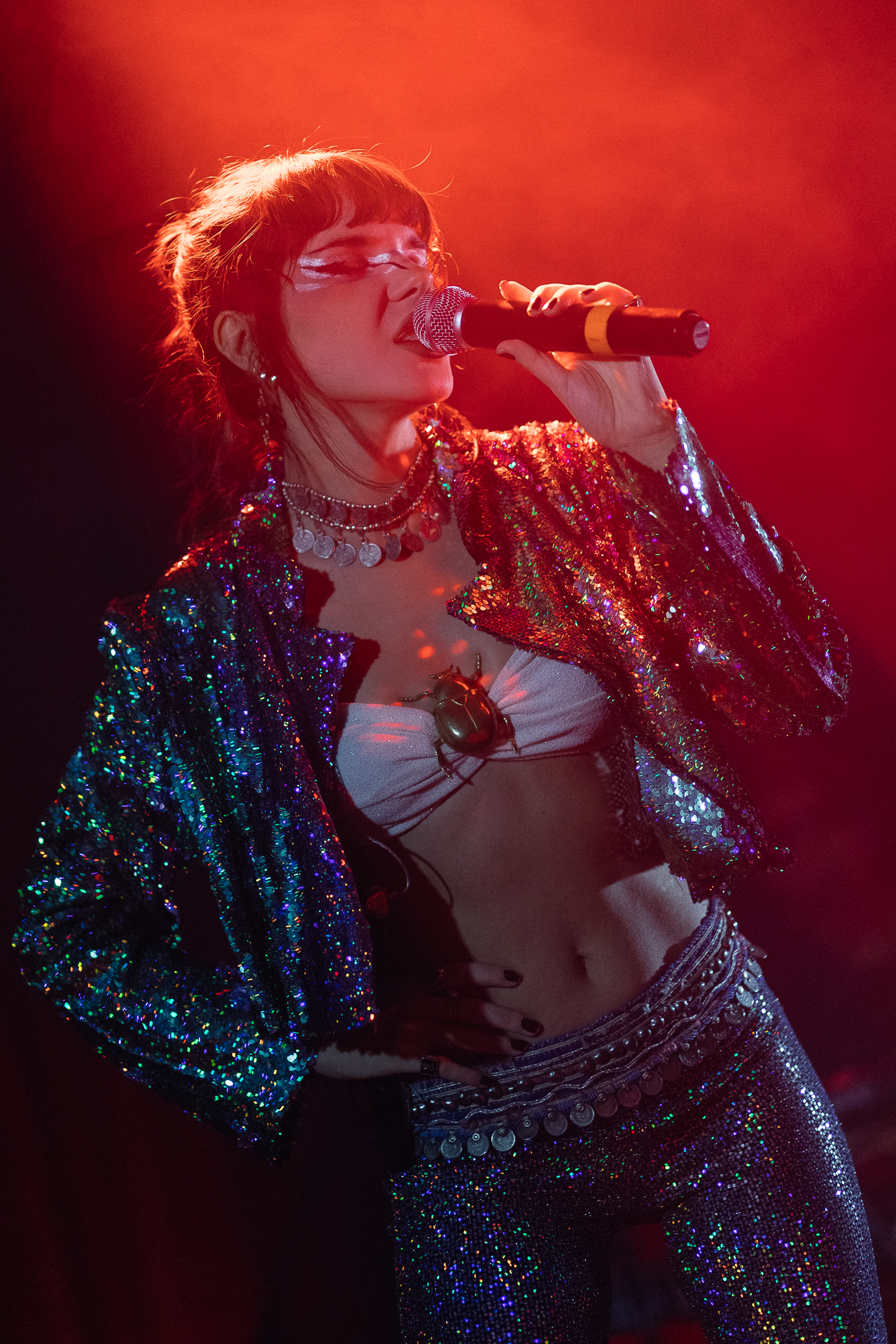
- During her concert in Tromsø, November 2023.

Background information
- Born: 30 January 1985 (age 41); Istanbul, Turkey
- Genres: psychedelic rock; post-punk; surf music; anatolian rock
- Years active: 2014–present
- Labels: Dunganga Records, Glitterbeat
- Member of: Toz ve Toz; SeniGörmem İmkansız
- Website: https://www.gayesuakyol.com

Gaye Su Akyol (born 30 January 1985) is a Turkish singer, painter and anthropologist.

== Biography ==
Akyol's father is the painter Muzaffer Akyol; her mother was a civil servant, but she died in 2014. She graduated from the anthropology department of Yeditepe University in 2007. After that she built her career as a painter with exhibitions both in Turkey and abroad. Before her solo career, she also performed in music bands Mai, Toz ve Toz and Seni Görmem İmkansız alongside Tuğçe Şenoğul.

In 2017, she composed a few songs for the soundtrack of Red Istanbul a film directed by Ferzan Özpetek. In November 2023 she recorded her first performance for the Seattle radio station KEXP.

Inspirations include singer-songwriter Selda Bağcan and the grunge band Nirvana.

== Band members ==
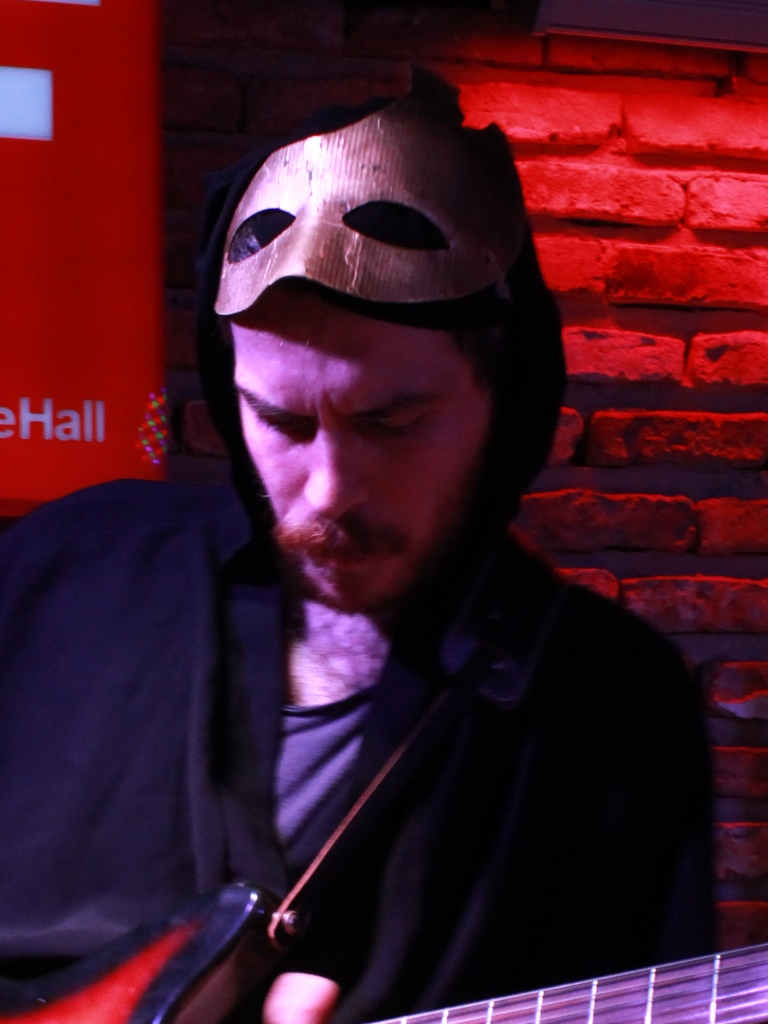
Ali Güçlü Şimşek

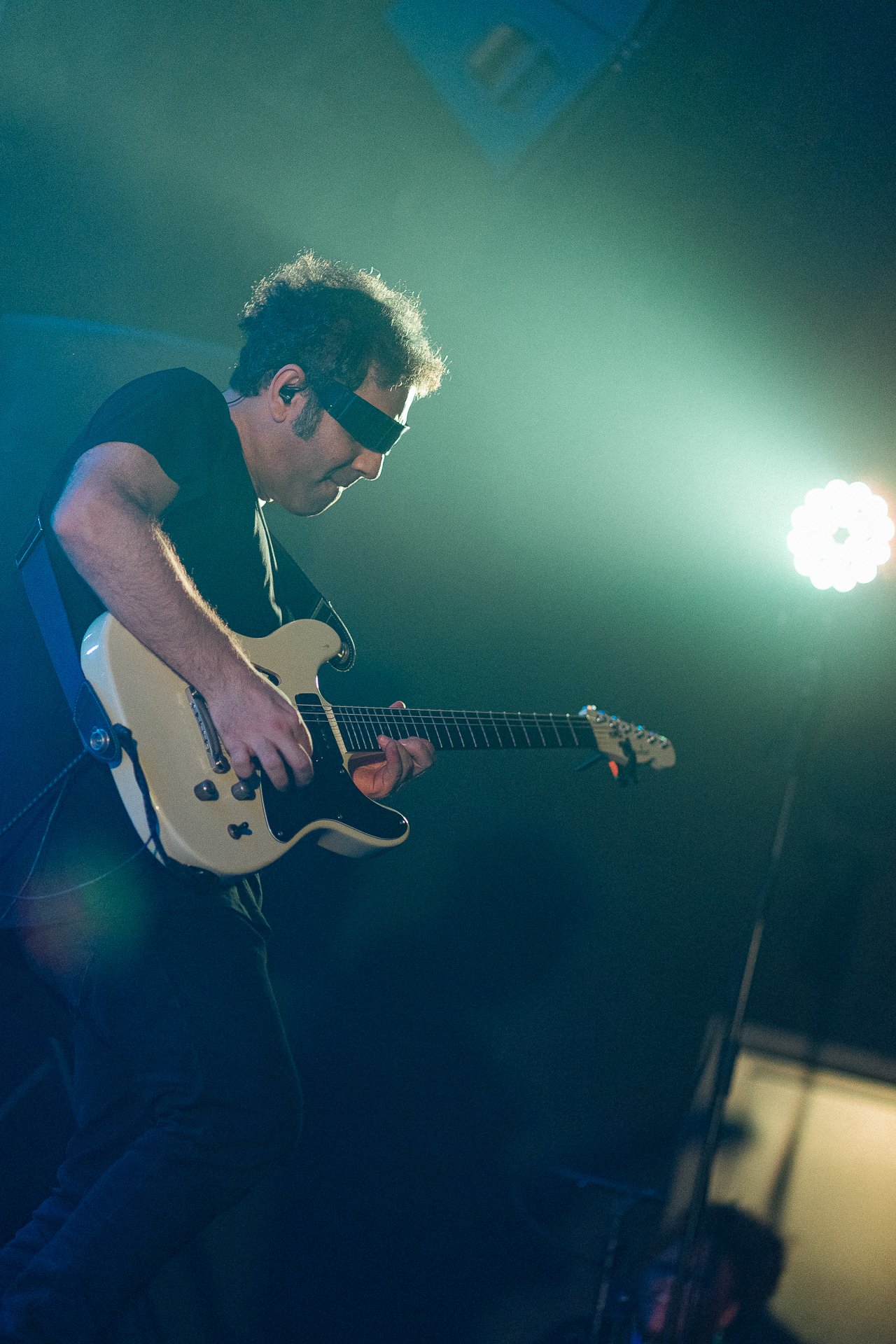
Görkem Karabudak

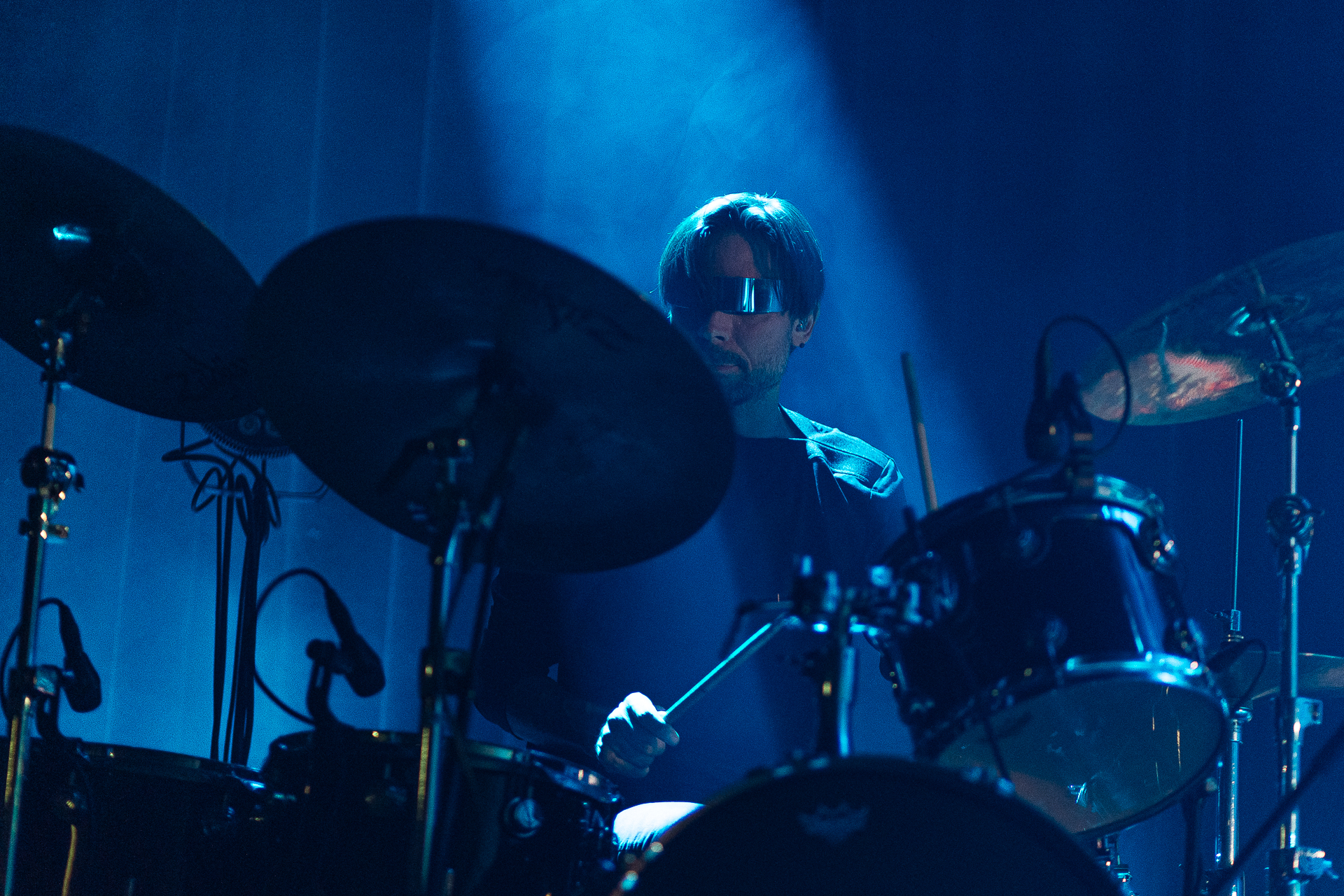
Berke Can Özcan

The lineup on Istikrarlı Hayal Hakikattir:

- Gaye Su Akyol – vocals, percussion, electronics
- Ali Güçlü Şimşek – electric and acoustic guitar, backing vocals
- Görkem Karabudak – bass and acoustic guitar, keyboard, electronics, backing vocals
- Ediz Hafızoğlu – drums

Guest musicians:

- İlhan Erşahin – saxophone
- Barlas Tan Özemek – classical guitar (şahmeran)
- Ahmet Ayzit – violin, ud, electro saz, cümbüş
- Ismail Darıcı – percussion
- Oğuz Can Bilgin – trumpet

== Discography ==
Studio albums

- Develerle Yaşıyorum (2014) ("I Live with Camels")
- Hologram İmparatorluğu (2016) ("Hologram Empire")
- İstikrarlı Hayal Hakikattir (2018) ("Consistent Fantasy Is Reality")
- Anadolu Ejderi (2022) ("Anatolian Dragon")

EPs

- Yort Savul: İSYAN MANİFESTOSU! (2020)

== Awards and recognition ==
Gaye Su Akyol received Best Artist award at Songlines Music Awards 2019. Gaye Su Akyol is also considered as an important figure for the LGBTQI+ community and featured on the cover of Gzone Magazine. In 2020, she appeared in trans biographical documentary film called İris, directed by Volkan Güleryüz.
