= Wife, Mother, Murderer =

- Genre: Drama
- Written by: David Eyre Jr.
- Directed by: Mel Damski
- Starring: Judith Light; David Ogden Stiers; Kellie Overbey; David Dukes; Whip Hubley
- Music by: Mark Snow
- Country of origin: United States
- Original language: English

Production
- Production locations: Atlanta; Newnan, Georgia
- Cinematography: Joe Pennella
- Editor: Michael S. Murphy
- Running time: 96 minutes
- Production company: Wilshire Court Productions

Original release
- Network: ABC
- Release: November 10, 1991

Wife, Mother, Murderer is a 1991 American made-for-television drama film directed by Mel Damski and starring Judith Light, David Ogden Stiers, Kellie Overbey, David Dukes, and Whip Hubley. The screenplay concerns Alabama murderer Marie Hilley.

== Cast ==
- Judith Light.....Marie Hilley/Robbi/Terri
- David Ogden Stiers.....John Homan
- Kellie Overbey.....Carol Hilley
- David Dukes.....Joe Hubbard
- Whip Hubley.....Lt. Gary Carroll
