= Ayten Gökçer =

Turkish actress (1940–2024)

- Born: Ayten Kaçmaz; 26 January 1940; Ankara, Turkey
- Died: 14 May 2024 (aged 84); Istanbul, Turkey
- Resting place: Zincirlikuyu Cemetery
- Occupation: Actress
- Years active: 1955–2017
- Spouse: Cüneyt Gökçer (m. 1964; died 2009)
- Children: 1

Ayten Gökçer (née Kaçmaz; 26 January 1940 – 14 May 2024) was a Turkish actress who performed across theatre, film, and television with a career spanning from 1955 to 2017.

== Early life and education ==
Ayten Gökçer was born in Ankara, Turkey on 26 January 1940. Raised in a culturally rich environment, she developed a passion for the performing arts from a young age. During her formative years, Gökçer pursued her interest by participating in school plays and local theatre productions.

After completing her secondary education, Gökçer enrolled in Hacettepe University to formalize her training in acting.

In 1952 she started the ballet department at Ankara State Conservatory.

== Acting career ==
Gökçer made her professional acting debut in 1965, in the Turkish film Taçsız Kral. In 1967 she played Tilda in 501 Numaralı Hücre. After a brief role 1980 in Yedi Kocalı Hürmüz, she acted in the 1984 film White Fire.

In 1999, Gökçer had a lead role playing Belgin for all 90 episodes of Yılan Hikayesi. She played Leyla for 28 episodes of Patron Kim in 2003. Gökçer starred in the Turkish film Hoşça Kal Güzin in 2008. Her final film was that same year, playing Betul in Red Istanbul.

== Personal life and death ==
Ayten Gökçer was married to Cüneyt Gökçer (1920–2009), long-time director of the Turkish State Theatres and professor at Hacettepe University. They had one daughter named Aslı.

She died on 14 May 2024 at the age of 84. Following a religious service, she was buried next to her spouse's grave at the Zincirlikuyu Cemetery.

== Awards and honours ==
Gökçer received several awards and honours throughout her career, including:

- Best Actress of the Year by the Art Enthusiasts Association (1967 and 1971)
- Best Artist of the Year by the Association of Journalists (1975)
- Outstanding Service Award by the Turkish Ministry of Culture (1966)
- Our Proud Artists Award in commemoration of the 75th year of the Turkish Republic (1998)
- Honoured with the title of State Artist by Turkey in 1988
