= Jamie Brewer =

American actress and model

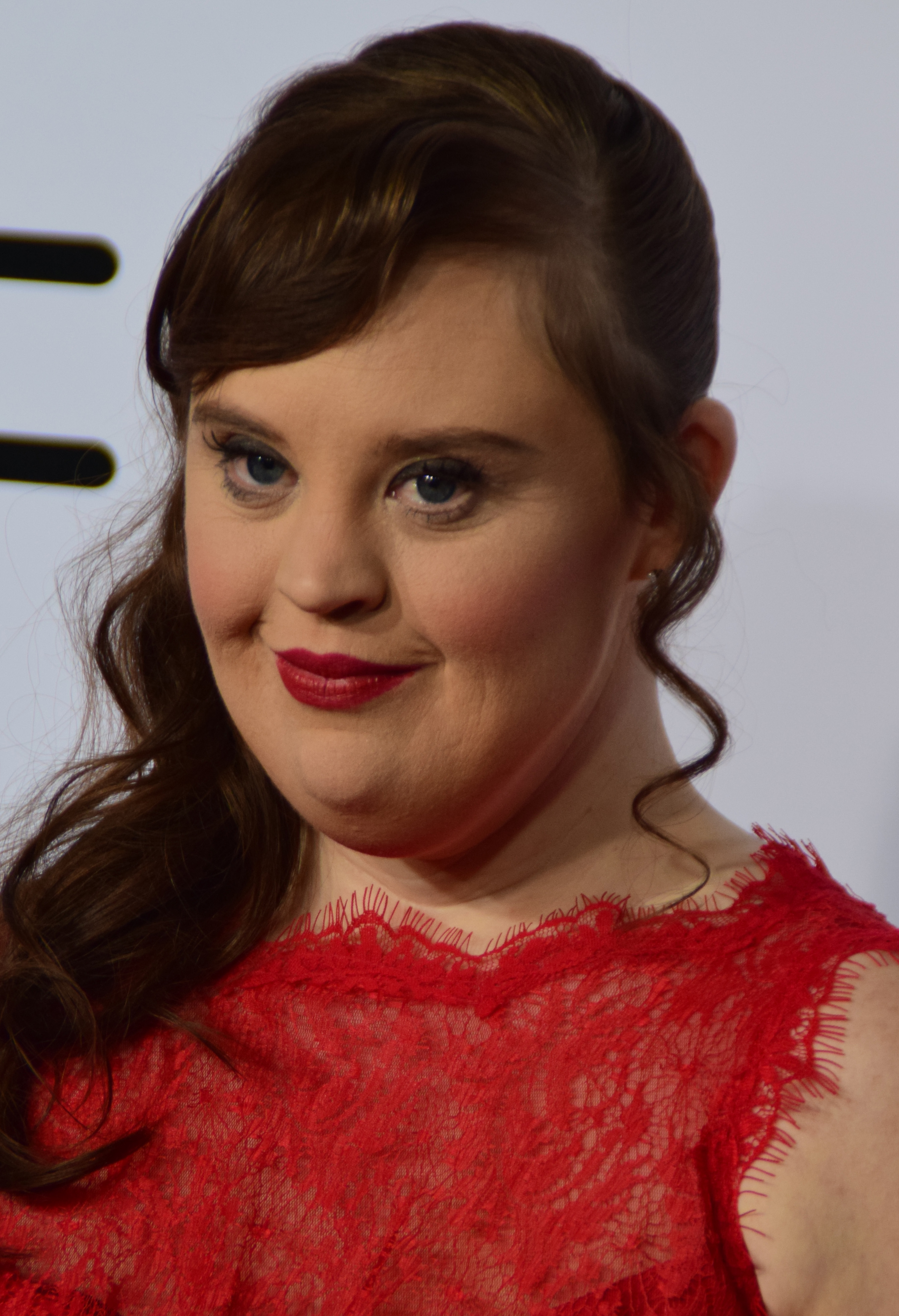
- Brewer at the 2015 Make-Up Artists & Hair Stylists Guild Awards, February 2015
- Born: February 5, 1984 (age 42)
- Occupations: Actress, model
- Years active: 2011–present

Jamie Brewer (born 1984 or 1985) is an American actress and model. She is best known for her roles in the FX horror anthology television series American Horror Story.

In its first season, Murder House, she portrayed Adelaide "Addie" Langdon; in the third season, Coven, she portrayed Nan, a clairvoyant witch; in the fourth season Freak Show, she portrayed Chester Creb's vision of his doll, Marjorie; in the seventh season Cult, she portrayed Hedda, a member of the 'SCUM' crew, led by feminist Valerie Solanas; and she returned to the roles of Nan in the eighth season, Apocalypse and Addie in the thirteenth season, 13.

In 2015, Brewer became the first woman with Down syndrome to walk the red carpet at New York Fashion Week.

== Life and career ==
Brewer grew up loving all forms of the arts, especially movies and theater productions. She started by taking theater classes in 1999 at a College for Kids class during her middle school years. She performed in dramas, musicals, comedies, and many improvisations during her theater training at Dionysus Theater. Brewer appeared and spoke in PSAs for the Super Bowl of Caring Houston Food Drive in Houston, Texas for two consecutive years which aired on NBC, ABC, and CBS. Brewer continues her stage training through The Groundlings Theater and School.

In 2011, Brewer made her television debut as Adelaide "Addie" Langdon in American Horror Story: Murder House. "I first got word of the audition for the show from a friend of mine." She said. "They were looking for a young lady with Down syndrome who could act. My headshot and resume were submitted and I was called for an audition and, to my surprise I got the part. I was so excited." About her role, Brewer stated: "Adelaide is a complex character, but the most difficult part of playing Adelaide is learning how to portray someone who isn't always viewed acceptable to her mother and society. This is a new challenge for me."

After the show's first season ended, she appeared on Southland in an episode titled "Heat", which aired on February 20, 2013. Also in 2013, she returned to American Horror Story for the third season, subtitled Coven, playing the supporting role of Nan, a young witch who is clairvoyant.

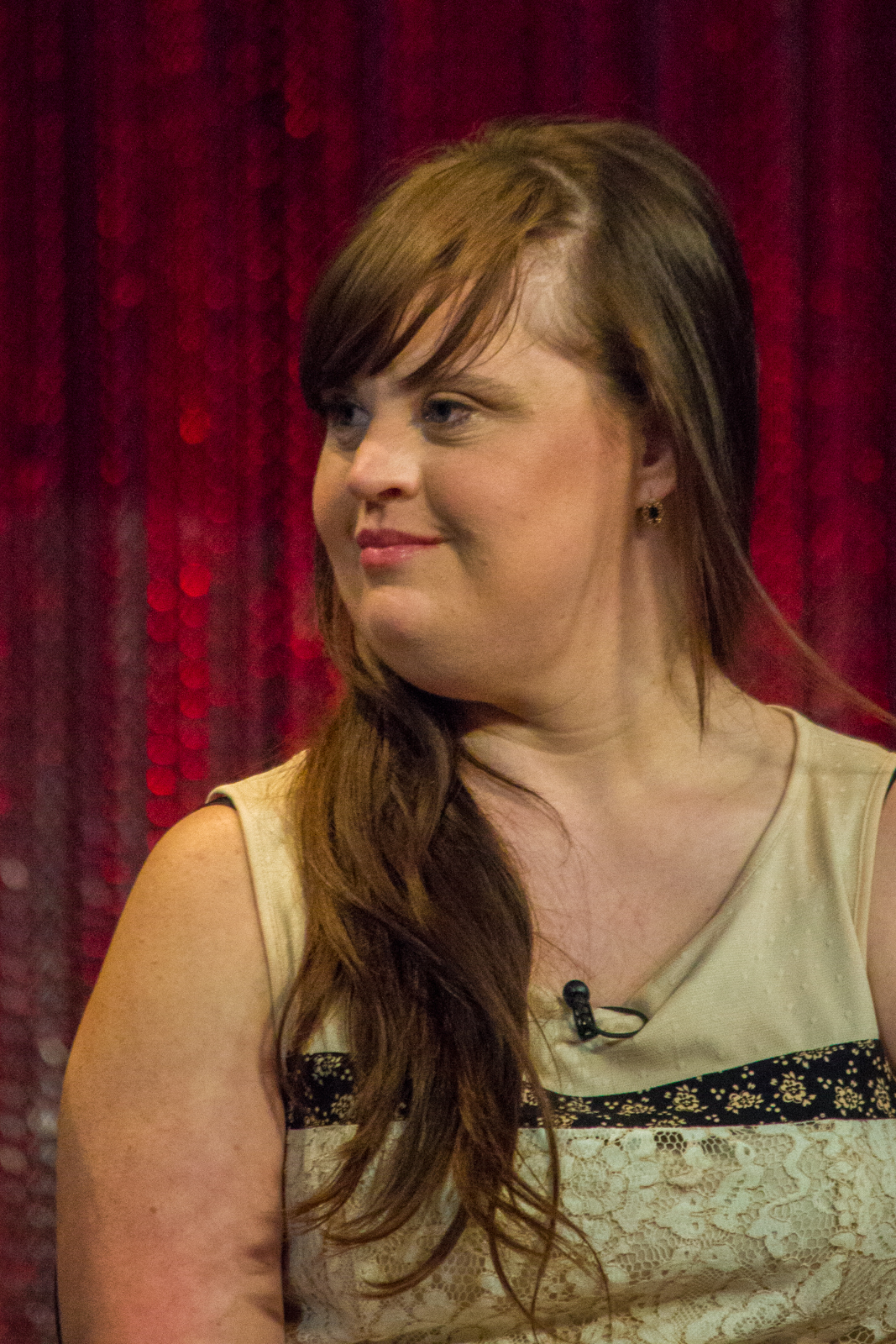
Brewer at PaleyFest 2014 for American Horror Story: Coven

It was announced at the 2014 PaleyFest that Brewer would return to the series for the fourth season, subtitled American Horror Story: Freak Show. Although, at a later date, show creator Ryan Murphy indicated Brewer may not appear during the season. Brewer was later confirmed after appearing in a promo for the final two episodes. She both voiced and played Marjorie, the ventriloquist's dummy of another character.

In February 2015, Brewer became the first woman with Down syndrome to walk the red carpet at New York Fashion Week, which she did for designer Carrie Hammer. Talking about the experience, Brewer said, "It's amazing that the fashion industry are including individuals with disabilities," she said. "It's an amazing opportunity for women, women that are disabled." Another time she also said, "Young girls and even young women [see me] and say 'hey, if she can do it so can I'. It's a true inspiration being a role model for any young women to [encourage them] in being who they are and showing who they are."

In July 2015, she appeared as a character named Jamie in three episodes of the web series Raymond & Lane. In September of the same year, Brewer appeared on Switched at Birth in an episode titled "Between Hope and Fear". The next month she claimed her title as a recipient of the Quincy Jones Exceptional Advocacy Award by the Global Down Syndrome Foundation. The same month, during an interview, Brewer was asked if she would make an appearance in American Horror Story's upcoming fifth season, subtitled Hotel. She responded with; "Possibly. I don't fully know, it depends. I really want to be." However, she did not appear in the season.

In May 2017, Brewer starred in the comedy short Whitney's Wedding, in which she played a bride who gets 'cold-feet' when she starts thinking her fiancé is not "normal". In October, American singer Miley Cyrus asked Brewer to introduce her at the Variety Power of Women event, where Cyrus received an award for The Happy Hippie Foundation. Cyrus' non-profit foundation focuses on youth homelessness (particularly among LGBTQ youth), the LGBTQ community, and other vulnerable populations. "We've never met in person before today, but I'm a huge fan of Jamie's,” Cyrus said during her acceptance speech. “I thought she would beautifully encompass the Happy Hippie Foundation and all we represent.” Brewer also returned to American Horror Story on its seventh season Cult. In the seventh episode of the season she portrayed Hedda, a member of the original 'SCUM' crew, led by feminist Valerie Solanas.

In February 2018, Brewer made her off-Broadway debut in Amy and the Orphans, a play by Lindsey Ferrentino about three siblings, one of whom has Down Syndrome, in the wake of their father's death. She was the first woman with Down syndrome to star in an Off-Broadway play. In April, Brewer was nominated for an Outstanding Featured Actress in a Play by the Outer Critics Circle Awards for her performance in Amy and the Orphans. In June of the same year, she won the Drama Desk Award for Outstanding Featured Actress in a Play for her performance. Soon afterwards, she was cast, as Gina, in the independent drama film Turnover.

During October, Brewer briefly appeared on American Horror Story once again, on its eighth season subtitled Apocalypse, where she reprised the role she played in Coven. Brewer's return as Nan received positive reviews from hardcore fans. Katie Louise-Smith from PopBuzz called Brewer "brilliant" and stated the return was "short but sweet". Ron Hogan of Den of Geek reacted to Brewer's return positively, noting her return was "handled well". However, Kat Rosenfield from Entertainment Weekly criticized the scene featuring Nan, commenting that it "serves mostly as fan service". Brewer also briefly appeared in the tenth and final episode of the season.

In 2021, Brewer reprised her role of Adelaide Langdon in "Game Over", the seventh and final episode of the first season of American Horror Stories, a spin-off of American Horror Story.

== Filmography ==
=== Film ===
Year	Title	Role	Notes
2014	Snow Moon: Cinderella Chronicles Saga	Aurora	
2017	Whitney's Wedding	Whitney	Short film
2017	Kill Off	Sonja	Short film
2019	Turnover	Gina	
2019	Second Date	Maura	Short film
2019	The Wagon	Claire	Short film
2019	The Hoarding	Mary	Short film
2021	Cherry	Shelly	
2026	Grace	Grace	Short film

=== Television ===
Year	Title	Role	Notes
2011	American Horror Story: Murder House	Adelaide "Addy" Langdon	Recurring role; 6 episodes
2013	Southland	Amanda	Episode: "Heat"
2013–2014	American Horror Story: Coven	Nan	Recurring role; 10 episodes
2015	American Horror Story: Freak Show	Marjorie	Episodes: "Magical Thinking" and "Show Stoppers"
2015	Switched at Birth	Teacher's Aide	Episode: "Between Hope and Fear"
2017	American Horror Story: Cult	Hedda	Episode: "Valerie Solanas Died for Your Sins: Scumbag"
2017	Love You More	Maggie	Television film
2018	American Horror Story: Apocalypse	Nan	Episodes: "Traitor" and "Apocalypse Then"
2020	Station 19	Rose	Episode: "Ice Ice Baby"
2021	American Horror Stories	Adelaide "Addy" Langdon	Episode: "Game Over"
2026	American Horror Story: 13	Adelaide "Addy" Langdon	3 episodes
2026	American Horror Story: 13	Nan	Episode: "Devil of a Good Time"

=== Theater ===
Year	Title	Role	Venue
2018	Amy and the Orphans	Amy	Off-Broadway, Laura Pels Theatre
2022	Corsicana	Ginny	Off-Broadway, Playwrights Horizons

=== Web ===
Year	Title	Role	Notes
2015	Raymond & Lane	Jamie	Guest role; 3 episodes
2025	Vic	Faye	

== Awards and nominations ==
Year	Award	Category	Work	Result	Ref.
2016	South Dakota Film Festival	Friend of the South Dakota Film Festival Award	Kill Off	Won	
2016	Media Access Award	SAG-AFTRA Harold Russell Award		Won	
2017	Easterseals Disability Film Challenge	Best Actor	Whitney's Wedding	Won	
2018	Drama Desk Award	Outstanding Featured Actress in a Play	Amy and the Orphans	Won	
2018	Outer Critics Circle Award	Outstanding Featured Actress in a Play	Amy and the Orphans	Nominated	
2018	Theatre World Award	Outstanding Debut	Amy and the Orphans	Won	
2019	Bentonville Film Festival	She Can See It, She Can Be It Award		Won	
2022	Berlin Music Video Award	Best Actor/Performer	"What's Done Is Done" by Delta Spirit	Nominated	
