= Amy and the Orphans =

2018 play by Lindsey Ferrentino

- 2018 Off-Broadway production poster
- Original language: English
- Written by: Lindsey Ferrentino
- Characters: Maggie; Jacob; Amy; Kathy; Bobby; Sarah
- Genre: Comedy
- Setting: Long Island, NY

Premiere
- Date: March 1, 2018
- Place: Laura Pels Theatre

Amy and the Orphans is a 2018 play by Lindsey Ferrentino. The play officially opened Off-Broadway at Roundabout Theatre Company's Laura Pels Theatre on March 1, 2018.

== Plot ==
Two siblings, Maggie and Jacob, decide to visit their sister, Amy, who has Down's syndrome, at an assisted living facility, to break the news about their father's death and mother's rapid demise. They decide to take a road trip to Long Island with Amy's nurse Kathy to lay their father to rest, flashing back intermittently to their parents' decisions to institutionalize Amy as a child.

== Production history ==
Ferrentino was inspired to write the play by her aunt who has Down syndrome.

The play premiered Off-Broadway at the Roundabout Theatre Company Laura Pels Theatre, beginning previews on February 1, 2022, and officially opened on March 1, 2018. The cast featured Vanessa Aspillaga as Kathy, Jamie Brewer as Amy, Josh McDermitt as Bobby, Mark Blum as Jacob, Diane Davis as Sarah, and Debra Monk as Maggie. It was directed by Scott Ellis. The production closed on April 22, 2018. Brewer won a Drama Desk Award and Theatre World Award for her performance, and was nominated for an Outer Critics Circle Award, along with Ferrentino. Additionally, Aspillaga was nominated for a Lucille Lortel Award for her performance.

Netflix will adapt the play into a feature film which is also written by Ferrentino, with Jamie Brewer set to reprise her role as Amy. The film is set to be produced by Jason Bateman and Michael Costigan through their production company, Aggregate, alongside Tracey Nyberg.

== Cast and characters ==
Character	Off-Broadway 2018
Maggie	Debra Monk
Jacob	Mark Blum
Amy	Jamie Brewer
Kathy	Vanessa Aspillaga
Bobby	Josh McDermitt
Sarah	Diane Davis

== Awards and nominations ==
Year	Award	Category	Work	Result	Ref.
2018	Drama Desk Award	Outstanding Featured Actress in a Play	Jamie Brewer	Won	
2018	Outer Critics Circle Award	John Gassner Award	Lindsey Ferrentino	Nominated	
2018	Outer Critics Circle Award	Outstanding Featured Actress in a Play	Jamie Brewer	Nominated	
2018	Lucille Lortel Award	Outstanding Featured Actress in a Play	Vanessa Aspillaga	Nominated	
2018	Theatre World Award	Outstanding Debut	Jamie Brewer	Won	

== Reviews ==
- New York Times Review
- Broadway World Review Roundup
- Hollywood Reporter Review
