= Sojourn (American Horror Story) =

- American Horror Story episode
- Episode no.: Season 8 Episode 8
- Directed by: Bradley Buecker
- Written by: Josh Green
- Production code: 8ATS08
- Original air date: October 31, 2018
- Running time: 37 minutes

Guest appearances
- Billy Eichner as Mutt Nutter; Sandra Bernhard as Hannah Putt; Harriet Sansom Harris as Madelyn Lurch; Carlo Rota as Anton LaVey; Dominic Burgess as Phil Devlin

Episode chronology
← Previous "Traitor"	Next → "Fire and Reign"
- American Horror Story: Apocalypse

"Sojourn" is the eighth episode of the eighth season of the anthology television series American Horror Story. It aired on October 31, 2018, on the cable network FX. The episode was written by Josh Green, and directed by Bradley Buecker.

== Plot ==
Michael Langdon is shocked in horror as he finds the charred corpses of the executed Ariel Augustus, Baldwin Pennypacker, and Miriam Mead. He is confronted by Cordelia Goode who declares the victory of the witches but insists that Michael still has the capacity for good. Michael dismisses her: he vows revenge on Cordelia and threatens to kill every witch of the coven.

Wandering into the wilderness, the distressed Michael begs his Father for guidance, and after four days, he receives visions of conflicting angelic and infernal natures. Weakened, he stumbles across a Satanic church where the High Priestess, Hannah Putt, berates her fellow worshippers for their unimpressive feats of sin, believing that the world must become significantly wicked to encourage the arrival of the Antichrist. A member of the congregation, Madelyn Lurch, takes pity on Michael, observing that he is malnourished and lost, and takes him to her home where she claims to have everything she wants due to her contract with Satan. Michael mocks her for her views and she attempts to kill him until he presents his Mark of the Beast, proving himself as the Antichrist. Back at the church, just before Hannah performs a human sacrifice, Madelyn interrupts and presents Michael, who confirms his identity and is hailed by the congregation. Michael proceeds to kill the two people offered up for sacrifice.

The congregation hosts a dinner for Michael who admits that he has no plan for bringing about the Apocalypse. Madelyn offers her services to him, but Michael tells her he only desires Mead's resurrection. Madelyn takes Michael to a robotics company run by two cocaine-addicted Satanists, Jeff Pfister, Mutt Nutter, and their assistant Wilhemina Venable. Michael is mocked by Jeff and Mutt at first, but upon displaying his powers, Jeff and Mutt pledge themselves to him, and they are tasked with recreating Mead as an android, which they accomplish.

== Reception ==
"Sojourn" was watched by 1.63 million people during its original broadcast, and gained a 0.7 ratings share among adults aged 18–49.

The episode received mixed reviews. On the review aggregator Rotten Tomatoes, "Sojourn" holds a 50% approval rating, based on 16 reviews with an average rating of 8/10. The critical consensus reads, "'Sojourn' saves itself from being a completely confusing bridge episode, thanks to a refocus on the existential sadness of Satan's spawn and a killer monologue from Sandra Bernhardt [sic]."

Ron Hogan of Den of Geek gave the episode a 3/5, saying, "Michael's trip back into the arms of the Church of Satan is one of the funniest things I've seen on American Horror Story. In true Satanic fashion, the gathering of Satan's flock of goats is essentially a mockery of a standard church service, with an offering plate being passed around and a sermon being delivered by the high Priestess (a really funny Sandra Bernhard)." He added, "Bradley Buecker does a good job at getting a sense of weariness out of the actors in the services. [...] no one seems to be having a very good time with what they're doing until they get a chance to show off for someone else. Otherwise, they're clearly bored, and trying to keep just busy enough to keep from getting yelled at."

Kat Rosenfield from Entertainment Weekly gave the episode a B+. She mentioned that some scenes were too confusing, especially the one where Michael experiences hallucinations and the one where the satanists are trying to please him with food. However, she appreciated that the episode gave finally some explanations about the post-apocalypse events of the season's first three episodes. She particularly enjoyed the appearance of Ms. Venable and the "true origin story of Robot Mead". Overall, she commented that it was "an extra-kooky, campy episode of AHS: Apocalypse", and that she was a big fan of Sandra Bernhard's appearance and performance.

Vulture's Ziwe Fumudoh gave the episode a 4 out of 5. Much like Rosenfield, she did not understand the scene where Michael experiences hallucinations, calling it a "weird acid trip". She was also confused by Michael's attitude during the episode, but admitted that "I understand that sometimes depression makes people not act like themselves, even when that "self" is Satan's spawn". However, she was extremely pleased by the return of Ms. Venable, saying that "The best part of American Horror Story is seeing Sarah Paulson in 19 different wigs this season." She also enjoyed the final scene as it was "setting the scene for the plot of Apocalypse to come full circle."
