= Red Istanbul =

- Theatrical release poster
- İstanbul Kırmızısı; Rosso Istanbul
- Directed by: Ferzan Özpetek
- Written by: Ferzan Özpetek
- Produced by: BKM; IMAJ; R&C Produzioni
- Starring: Halit Ergenç; Tuba Büyüküstün; Nejat İşler; Mehmet Günsür; Şerif Sezer
- Music by: Giuliano Taviani; Carmelo Travia; Gaye Su Akyol
- Release date: 3 March 2017
- Countries: Turkey; Italy
- Language: Turkish
- Budget: €5.5 million
- Box office: ₺6.3 million

Red Istanbul (Turkish: İstanbul Kırmızısı, Italian: Rosso Istanbul) is a 2017 drama film directed by Ferzan Özpetek, based on the novel written by Özpetek, published in 2013. The film was shot in Turkish language with a cast composed entirely of Turkish actors, 16 years after his second work Harem Suare, director Özpetek came back to shoot a film in Istanbul. The film's first international promotion was held at the Rome Film Festival.

== Plot ==
The story centers around writer Orhan Şahin, who has returned to Istanbul after so many years to help the well-known director Deniz Soysal to write his first novel. As he does so, Orhan finds himself looking with nostalgia at the places where he was born and raised, reliving the relationships with friends, family and past loves.

== Cast ==
- Halit Ergenç: Orhan Şahin
- Tuba Büyüküstün: Neval
- Mehmet Günsür: Yusuf
- Nejat İşler: Deniz Soysal
- Şerif Sezer: Annesi
- Serra Yılmaz: Sibel
- Zerrin Tekindor: Aylin
- Ayten Gökçer: Betül
- İpek Bilgin: Güzin
- Çiğdem Selışık Onat: Süreyya
- Reha Özcan: Ali

== Production ==
The shooting was expected to begin in September 2015, but after several delays, due to the delicate social / political situation of the Turkish city, filming officially began April 12, 2016, for a total of seven weeks. The sequences have taken place entirely in Istanbul, but in some areas, for safety reasons, it was not possible to shoot. The film cost 5.5 million Euro.

== Distribution ==
The film has been released in Italian language in Italy on 2 March 2017, while in Turkey it was released on March 3. It was distributed by 01 Distribution in Italy and by Mars Dağıtım in Turkey.
