= Traitor (American Horror Story) =

- American Horror Story episode
- Episode no.: Season 8 Episode 7
- Directed by: Jennifer Lynch
- Written by: Adam Penn
- Production code: 8ATS07
- Original air date: October 24, 2018
- Running time: 44 minutes

Guest appearances
- Frances Conroy as Myrtle Snow; Lance Reddick as Papa Legba; Taissa Farmiga as Zoe Benson; Gabourey Sidibe as Queenie; Jamie Brewer as Nan; Jon Jon Briones as Ariel Augustus; Billy Porter as Behold Chablis; BD Wong as Baldwin Pennypacker; Lauren Stamile as Wife; Tom Fitzpatrick as Grandpa; Joan Collins as Bubbles McGee

Episode chronology
← Previous "Return to Murder House"	Next → "Sojourn"
- American Horror Story: Apocalypse

"Traitor" is the seventh episode of the eighth season of the anthology television series American Horror Story. It aired on October 24, 2018, on the cable network FX. The episode was written by Adam Penn, and directed by Jennifer Lynch.

== Plot ==
Voodoo queen Dinah Stevens is seen performing a ritual on a man who is guilty of having extramarital sex. Dinah gets paid by the cheated wife and surprises her with the woman's ripped-out heart which she puts in a blender, together with some other concoctions. After forcing the husband to swallow the potion, Dinah leaves and is confronted outside by Cordelia. The witch reveals she needs Dinah's help with summoning Papa Legba in order to stop Michael.

On the set of a slasher movie, witch actress Bubbles McGee is visited by Madison. The ex-coven member is needed back within the circle in order to use her exceptional telepathic powers on Ariel Augustus and Baldwin Pennypacker. Meanwhile, Cordelia and Dinah summon Papa Legba who is accompanied by the soul of dead witch Nan. Cordelia tells Legba about preparing a trap for Michael: banishing him to Hell forever. Legba demands the souls of all the witches in return but the Supreme refuses and Legba disappears.

At Miss Robichaux's, Coco discovers a new power – she can divine calorie content of meals. While eating a snowball, Coco begins to choke and dies, but Mallory telekinetically opens Coco's throat, removing the snowball and saving her life. Such a feat makes Zoe think it's rather Mallory than Michael who is responsible for Cordelia's powers waning. Bubbles and Myrtle have dinner with Ariel and Baldwin and Bubbles uses her powers to learn about the warlocks' plans to assassinate their fellow John Henry Moore as well all the witches of Robichaux's.

Coco and the coven's bodyguards kidnap the satanist Mead who murdered John Henry. Meanwhile, witches have Mallory go through the trials of the Seven Wonders. Mallory passes all of them, most notably the final one by bringing Moore back to life. Cordelia and Myrtle expose and capture Baldwin and Ariel who were planning to kill the coven with a poisonous chemical. Both warlocks along with Mead are burned at the stake for their crimes.

== Reception ==
"Traitor" was watched by 1.85 million people during its original broadcast, and gained a 0.9 ratings share among adults aged 18–49.

The episode received positive reviews from critics. On the review aggregator Rotten Tomatoes, "Traitor" holds an 87% approval rating, based on 15 reviews with an average rating of 6/10. The critical consensus reads, "Tricky table setting doesn't stop "Traitor" from having its cake and eating it too, skillfully returning to campy form with ample gore and a wholly reunited coven."

Ron Hogan of Den of Geek gave the episode a 3/5, saying, "The stylistic choices—especially the 70's style film segment and the voodoo-themed cold opening—work really well. Lynch has a great eye, and she's adept at the house style of American Horror Story, particularly the newsreel of John Henry's resurrection. She also has a great handle on the actors involved, and the choice to have Miriam face her fiery death with a gleeful grin was a brilliant one. She might not have magical powers or be the child of Satan, but there's something truly evil about her that gives her true power that the others cannot replicate."

Kat Rosenfield from Entertainment Weekly gave the episode a B. She criticized the scene with Papa Legba and Nan, commenting that it "serves mostly as fan service [...] and the plot of the series advances by, like, a millimeter." She was also not a fan of the multiple plot conveniences, like during the dinner scene with the warlocks or how Coco somehow located Mead. However, she enjoyed Collins' new character, calling her "an aging glamazon" and "a useful asset for the coven's next play". She also praised the development of Dinah' character, but also the characters of Mallory and Behold.

Vulture's Ziwe Fumudoh gave the episode a 4 out of 5. She particularly enjoyed the final scene of the episode, commenting that it is "when we see the witches in all their badass glory". She also appreciated the fact that the character of John Henry was not forgotten, and the developments of Mallory and Dinah. However, she criticized the character of Coco, saying that she is "like the Weight Watchers of witches, which isn't particularly interesting", and the dinner scene with the warlocks.
