= Aideen O'Kelly =

Irish actress (1936–2015)

- Aideen O'Kelly, from a 1980 newspaper.
- Born: 5 September 1936; Dalkey, County Dublin, Ireland
- Died: 22 April 2015 (aged 78); Englewood, New Jersey, U.S.
- Occupation: Actress

Aideen O'Kelly (5 September 1936 – 22 April 2015) was an Irish actress of stage and television, who worked in both Ireland and the United States. She was nominated for a Drama Desk Award for her performance in Othello in 1982.

== Early life ==
Aideen O'Kelly was from Dalkey, a suburb of Dublin. Her father was Dermod O'Kelly, an accountant. Her mother, Florence Ledwidge, worked for the Dublin Gas Company. Her sister Emer O'Kelly became a theatre critic.

== Career ==
=== Irish theatre ===
O'Kelly was sent by director Ernest Blyth to the Aran Islands as a teenaged actress, to improve her spoken Irish for performing at the Abbey Theatre. She went on to star in productions at the Abbey, including The Plough and the Stars (1966), The Playboy of the Western World (1968). In 1984 she played the Mother Superior in a Dublin production of Agnes of God. She was also in a production of The Plough and the Stars in London in the 1990s, directed by her Abbey colleague Joe Dowling. She wrote about meeting with Samuel Beckett in a 1990 article for Backstage.

=== In the United States ===
O'Kelly appeared on Broadway in A Life (1980-1981), as Emilia in Othello (1982, with James Earl Jones and Christopher Plummer), in Philadelphia Here I Come! (1994, with Milo O'Shea), and in The Beauty Queen of Leenane (1998-1999). She won a 1982 Drama Desk Award for her Emilia in Othello. She also appeared in numerous Irish Repertory Theatre productions in New York. She appeared off-Broadway on several occasions, including in Frank McGuinness's Baglady, Samuel Beckett's Happy Days (1987), Stephen Jeffreys' The Libertine (1998), and Joseph O'Connor's Red Roses and Petrol (2000).

Mel Gussow, The New York Times critic, said of O'Kelly in Happy Days that: "Aideen O'Kelly conforms more than many of her predecessors to the physical outline suggested by the author: blond, plump and bosomy. At the outset, the actress has an amiable, almost chipper quality as she goes through Winnie's ritual ablutions and her marital memories." Broadway caricaturist Al Hirschfeld drew O'Kelly three times, in her roles in A Life, Othello and Happy Days.

=== Film and television ===
In Ireland, O'Kelly won a Jacob's Award for best actress in 1970, for a television role. She appeared on American television in episodes of Third Watch and Law & Order, both filmed in New York City, and the soap opera Another World. She also had roles in the televised versions of the plays A Life (1984) and Playboy of the Western World (1983). Film roles for O'Kelly included parts in Boyd's Shop (1960), Family Business (1989), and A Perfect Murder (1998).

O'Kelly appears as herself in Still Dreaming (2014), a documentary about the Lillian Booth Actors Home.

== Personal life ==
Aideen O'Kelly married Eoin Troy; they later divorced. She had four children, Judith, Orla, Kevin and David. She moved to the United States in 1979, and there converted to Judaism. She died in 2015, aged 78 years, at the Lillian Booth Actors Home in Englewood, New Jersey.

== Filmography ==
Year	Title	Role	Notes
1960	Boyd's Shop	Agnes Boyd	
1962	The Webster Boy	Mary	
1989	Family Business	Widow Doheny	
1998	A Perfect Murder	Met Woman #2	
