= The Royal Family of Broadway (musical) =

- Music: William Finn
- Lyrics: William Finn
- Book: James Lapine; Rachel Sheinkin
- Basis: The Royal Family by Edna Ferber; George S. Kaufman
- Productions: 1998 Workshop; 2000 Workshop; 2018 Barrington Stage Company

The Royal Family of Broadway is a musical by William Finn and Rachel Sheinkin based on the 1927 play The Royal Family by George S. Kaufman and Edna Ferber. It premiered at the Barrington Stage Company in June 2018.

== Plot ==
The musical is set in the 1920s and tells the story of a girl from a family of great Broadway actors who contemplates leaving show business and getting married. The characters are a parody of the American Barrymore-Drew theatrical family.

== Productions ==
An earlier version of the same show had an invite-only workshop in 1998. With a book by Richard Greenberg, the cast included Eileen Heckart (Fanny), Donna Murphy (Julia), Claire Lautier (Gwen), Remak Ramsey (Burt), Reg Rogers (Tony), Howard McGillin (Gil, Julia's love interest), Rick Holmes (Perry, Gwen's love interest), Debra Monk (Kitty, Burt's wife), and Dick Latessa (Oscar, the producer).

A second workshop, produced in 2000 by Barry and Fran Weissler, was directed by Jerry Zaks and choreographed by Scott Wise. The cast included Laura Benanti (Gwen), Carolee Carmello (Julie), Tovah Feldshuh (Kitty), Elaine Stritch (Fanny), Bryan Batt (Tony), Jonathan Bleicher (little boy), John Dossett (Gil), Larry Keith (Oscar), and Jeremy Webb (Perry). The ensemble included Cleve Asbury, Jim Borstelman, Susan Fletcher, Casey Miles Good, Susan Hefner, Danette Holden, Joe Locarro, Mary McCloud, Clasi Miller, Mark C. Reif, Josh Rhodes, and Jerome Vivona.

A private reading was held in March 2001, with a new book by James Lapine. Finn lost the adaptation rights to the play, and then gained the rights again in 2012, with Rachel Sheinkin working on the book.

The reworked show premiered at the Barrington Stage Company. The show was directed by John Rando and choreographed by Joshua Bergasse. The cast featured, as the Cavendish family: Harriet Harris (Fanny), Laura Michelle Kelly (Julie), Will Swenson (Tony), and Hayley Podschun (Gwen). The cast also featured Arnie Burton (Bert), Kathy Fitzgerald (Kitty Dean), Alan H. Green (Gil), AJ Shively (Perry), and Chip Zien (Oscar). The ensemble featured Holly Ann Butler, Michelle E. Carter, Tim Fuchs, Eli Goykhman, Tyler Johnson-Campion, Lindsay Kraft, Sam Paley, Tyler Matthew Roberts, Patrick Sharpe, Westley Strausman, Chiara Trentalange, Jake Vacanti, and Noah Virgile. The production was scheduled to run from June 7, 2018 to July 7.

== Musical numbers ==
Act I

- "Just Another Regular Night/Listen to the Beat" – Julie and company
- "Marry A Man Of The Theater" – Fanny and Julie
- "Twenty Years of Questions"
- "Too Much" – Tony, Family, and reporters
- "Baby Let's Stroll" – Perry and Gwen
- "Stupid Things I Won't Do" – Fanny
- "How I Wanted"
- "The Girl I'll Never Be"
- "The Royal Family Of Broadway" – Fanny, Kitty, Gwen, Tony, Bert, and Oscar
- "Absolutely Not"

Act II

- "Avaunt, Avaunt" – Bert and Kitty
- "Nobody's Left In The Theatre" – Fanny, Bert, Kitty, and company
- "I Have Found" – Julie
- "More Drama (Reprise)"
- "I Couldn't Want More"
- "If You Marry An Actress" – Gilbert and Perry
- "Gloriously Imperfect" – Oscar
- "Civilization Won't Die"
- "Finale"

== Original cast ==
Character	Actor
Fanny Cavendish	Harriet Sansom Harris
Julie Cavendish	Laura Michelle Kelly
Gwen Cavendish	Hayley Podschun
Perry Stewart	A. J. Shively
Gilbert Marshall	Alan H. Green
Della	Holly Ann Butler
Bert Dean	Arnie Burton
Kitty Dean	Kathryn Fitzgerald
Oscar Wolfe	Chip Zien
Tony Cavendish	Will Swenson
