= The Assembled Parties =

2013 American play written by Richard Greenberg

The Assembled Parties is a play written by Richard Greenberg. It relates the story of a Jewish family living on the Upper West Side of New York City over a twenty-year period, from 1980 to 2000. The play, which premiered on Broadway in 2013, received three Tony Award nominations, including for Best Play.

== Broadway production ==
The play opened on Broadway at the Samuel J. Friedman Theatre in a Manhattan Theatre Club production on April 17, 2013 after previews from March 21, 2013. Directed by Lynne Meadow, the play featured Judith Light as Faye, Jessica Hecht as Julie, Jake Silbermann as Scotty/Tim Bascov, Jonathan Walker as Ben and Mark Blum as Mort. The sets were by Santo Loquasto and costumes by Jane Greenwood.

The play, a limited run, extended for a second time to July 7, 2013, and then for a final time, to July 28, 2013. When the play closed on July 28, it had run for 119 performances and 28 previews.

== London production ==
In October 2025, the play had its UK premiere at the Hampstead Theatre in London.It was directed by Blanche McIntyre and starred Tracy-Ann Oberman as Faye and Jennifer Westfeldt as Julie. Sam Marks portrayed Jeff; Alexander Marks played Scotty/Tim; with Daniel Abelson, David Kennedy and Julia Kass as Ben, Mort and Shelley, respectively.

== Synopsis ==
In 1980, the Bascov family gets together to celebrate Christmas. They are Jewish, but do not observe their religion. They gather at the large and luxurious Upper West Side (New York) apartment of Julie, a former teen movie star, and her wealthy husband Ben. Also present are their sons Scotty, recently graduated from college and young Timmy, sick with the flu. Ben's sister Faye, her husband Mort and their daughter, Shelley, arrive. Jeff, a school friend of Scotty, is a visitor.

20 years later, in 2000, the family meets again at Christmas at Julie's apartment. However, now Ben, Mort, and Scotty are dead, and Shelley is estranged. Those present are Julie, who has a fatal illness; Faye, now no longer taking medications; and Jeff, returned from a successful law job in Chicago. Tim (no longer Timmy) comes and goes; he has been forced to leave college and works at a restaurant.

== Critical response ==
Ben Brantley, in his review for The New York Times, called the play "charming", writing "It is also smart, sad and so impossibly well-spoken you may feel like giving up on conversation.... is an elegy to a breed of woman, a style of living and a genre of theater of which only vestiges remain in frantic, self-promoting New York." The USA Today reviewer called the play "endearing", writing "By the time Act Two unfolds -- 20 years later, in the same apartment -- we have learned that these folks are all vulnerable to bad choices, the whims of fortune and the simple passing of time."

The play received three Tony Award nominations: Best Play, Best Performance by an Actress in a Featured Role in a Play (Judith Light) and Best Scenic Design of a Play (Santo Loquasto). The play received Drama Desk Award nominations for Outstanding Play, Outstanding Featured Actress in a Play (Judith Light), Outstanding Director of a Play, and Outstanding Set Design.

== Awards and nominations ==
The production was recognized with Drama League Award nominations for Outstanding Production of a Broadway or Off-Broadway Play and with two Distinguished Performance Award nominations but did not win. The production received one Outer Critics Circle Award nomination. The play earned four 58th Drama Desk Award nominations and one win for Judith Light as Outstanding Featured Actress in a Play. The play received three Tony Awards nominations for the 67th Tony Awards, again winning Featured Actress in a Play.

=== Original Broadway production ===
| Year | Award | Category | Nominee | Result |
|---|---|---|---|---|
| 2013 | Drama League Award | Outstanding Production of a Broadway or Off-Broadway Play | | Nominated |
| 2013 | Drama League Award | Distinguished Performance Award | Jessica Hecht | Nominated |
| 2013 | Drama League Award | Distinguished Performance Award | Judith Light | Nominated |
| 2013 | Outer Critics Circle Award | Outstanding Featured Actress in a Play | Judith Light | Nominated |
| 2013 | Drama Desk Award | Outstanding Play | | Nominated |
| 2013 | Drama Desk Award | Outstanding Featured Actress in a Play | Judith Light | Won |
| 2013 | Drama Desk Award | Outstanding Director of a Play | Lynne Meadow | Nominated |
| 2013 | Drama Desk Award | Outstanding Set Design | Santo Loquasto | Nominated |
| 2013 | Tony Award (67th) | Best Play | | Nominated |
| 2013 | Tony Award (67th) | Featured Actress in a Play | Judith Light | Won |
| 2013 | Tony Award (67th) | Scenic Design | Santo Loquasto | Nominated |
