= Harriet Sansom Harris =

American actress (born 1955)

- Born: January 8, 1955 (age 71); Fort Worth, Texas, U.S.
- Other name: Harriet Harris
- Education: Juilliard School (BFA)
- Occupation: Actress
- Years active: 1977–present

Harriet Sansom Harris (born January 8, 1955) is an American actress known for her theater performances and for her portrayals of Bebe Glazer on Frasier and Felicia Tilman on Desperate Housewives.

Harris won a Tony Award in 2002 as a Featured Actress in a Musical for her performance in Thoroughly Modern Millie. In addition to television and theater, she has made various film appearances, including Memento, Addams Family Values, Nurse Betty, and Phantom Thread.

== Early life ==
Harris was born in Fort Worth, Texas, one of three children. On her mother's side, she is a descendant of one of the brothers of Marion Sansom, a 20th-century rancher and civic leader. Sansom Park is named after him. She began acting as a youngster, attending Arlington Heights High School. She attended Fort Worth Country Day School and graduated from there in 1973. At age 17, she was accepted at the Juilliard School's Drama Division (1973–77, Group 6) where she earned a Bachelor of Fine Arts degree.

After graduation from Juilliard, she joined John Houseman's touring repertory company The Acting Company, where she stayed for three years. During this time, she performed in productions of Shakespeare's King Lear and Romeo and Juliet, Antigone, and Mother Courage and Her Children.

== Career ==
=== Theatre ===
Harris worked extensively on and Off-Broadway, including a 1989 performance at Second Stage Theatre in What a Man Weighs. One of her breakthrough performances was in the original cast of Paul Rudnick's Jeffrey, in which she was the sole female cast member.

In 1992, Harris made her Broadway debut in Four Baboons Adoring the Sun. That same year, she was nominated for a Drama Desk Award for her portrayal in the Off-Broadway play Bella, Belle of Byelorussia. In 1993, she received a second Drama Desk nomination for her performance in Jeffrey. She won both a Drama Desk and Tony Award in 2002 as a Featured Actress in a Musical for playing the role of Mrs. Meers in Thoroughly Modern Millie.

Since 2005, Harris has appeared in various stage productions across the United States. In summer 2006, she appeared as Vera Charles in the Kennedy Center's production of Mame opposite Christine Baranski in the title role. In early 2007, Harris appeared as Amanda Wingfield in the production of The Glass Menagerie at the Guthrie Theater. In summer 2007, she appeared on Broadway in the revival of the John Van Druten comedy Old Acquaintance as Mildred Watson Drake with Margaret Colin at the American Airlines Theatre.

In 2007, Harris returned to Broadway and joined the cast of the musical Cry-Baby, based on the John Waters film of the same name. The show previewed on Broadway at the Marquis Theatre on March 15, 2008, and opened on April 24. The production was nominated for Best Musical at the 2008 Tony Awards, and closed on June 22, 2008. She returned to Broadway as the Evil Stepmother in Cinderella in 2013. In 2015, Harris took on the role as the mother of the groom-to-be (who secretly wishes that her son was gay) in the musical comedy It Shoulda Been You, sparring with Tyne Daly who played the mother of the bride-to-be. Harris played the role of Fanny, head of the Cavendish family, in the musical The Royal Family of Broadway at the Barrington Stage Company, Massachusetts, from June to July 2018.

=== Television ===
Harris's work in Jeffrey led to numerous television guest appearances, including a recurring role on the sitcom Frasier as Frasier's conniving agent Bebe Glazer from 1993 to 2004. Harris co-starred in several short-lived series, including The 5 Mrs. Buchanans, Union Square, The Beast, and It's All Relative, but played notable guest roles on multiple hit series, including Ghost Whisperer, Murphy Brown, Ally McBeal, Six Feet Under, and Ellen. Among them was her performance on The X-Files in the 1993 episode "Eve" as Dr. Sally Kendrick and her "Eve" clones. Series creator Chris Carter and Entertainment Weekly praised her casting and performance. The band Eve 6 was named after the character.

Harris played Martha Huber's sister Felicia Tilman on the ABC drama series Desperate Housewives in 2004. The narrative saw Felicia arrive on Wisteria Lane to discover who was behind her sister's murder. She soon came to the conclusion that Paul Young was responsible, but before she could act out her revenge, she was attacked by his son Zach Young. To finish the story-line, she returned for the second season in 2005, which followed Felicia as she planned her final acts of revenge against Paul. She departed at the end of the second series by faking her own murder, framing Paul, and sending him to prison. She returned to Desperate Housewives for the series' seventh season. On playing the character Harris commented:

People do find Felicia evil. I think she's just determined. She's a zealot pursuing an objective that no-one wants her to pursue. And it makes her really eccentric. And even though a man she's pursuing is the one who committed murder, he's only considered creepy by people and Felicia is always considered evil. I think that's so interesting because he's really the bad person. She's just trying to get him caught. But she is extreme. I think she doesn't stop when others would. She keeps on, she keeps pursuing and I think that is a scary thing. She just keeps scraping away until she eventually gets what she wants. And if she doesn't get it one way, she'll go around and do it another way. She's completely unapologetic about it. She doesn't care what anybody else thinks.

In 2006, Harris starred in the Sci-Fi Channel miniseries The Lost Room as Margaret Milne.

In 2018, Harris appeared as Madelyn in the American Horror Story: Apocalypse episode "Sojourn", and as Adriana in the Dynasty episode "Queen of Cups". She appeared as Ingrid Blix in the Netflix drama series Ratched in 2020.

In 2024, Harris reprised her role as Bebe in Paramount's Frasier reboot. Later, she starred as Dr. Rachel Blake in the drama series The Agency.

== Filmography ==
Key
†	Denotes titles that have not yet been released

=== Film ===
Year	Title	Role	Notes
1993	Addams Family Values	Ellen Buckman	
1994	Quiz Show	Enright's Secretary	
1996	Romeo + Juliet	Susan Santandiago	
1998	The Jungle Book: Mowgli's Story	Turtle / Rhesus (voice)	
2000	Nurse Betty	Ellen	
2000	Memento	Mrs. Jankis	
2001	The One	Nurse Besson	
2005	Monster-in-Law	Therapist	
2009	Moonlight Serenade	Angelica Webster	
2011	Rampart	Stacy Cranston	
2014	Love Is Strange	Honey	
2017	Phantom Thread	Barbara Rose	
2020	Baby	Emakumea	
2021	Licorice Pizza	Mary Grady	
2023	Magazine Dreams	Patricia Waldron	
2023	Americana	Tish	
2023	Jules	Sandy	

=== Television ===
Year	Title	Role	Notes
1983	Another World	Cathy Harris	Episode: "20 May 1983"
1989	Doctor Doctor	Peggy Murtaugh	Episode: "The Murtagh Conundrum"
1989	Highway to Heaven	Ruth Ann Kifer	Episode: "Merry Christmas from Granpa"
1991	Golden Years	Francie Will	2 episodes
1991	Law & Order	Sheila	Episode: "The Troubles"
1992	Fool's Fire	Lady Clairce	Television movie
1992	Law & Order	Mrs. Kenny	Episode: "The Corporate Veil"
1993	Lifestories: Families in Crisis	Cedall	Episode: "Dead Drunk: The Kevin Tunell Story"
1993	The X-Files	Sally Kendrick/Eves 6, 7, & 8	Episode: "Eve"
1993–2004	Frasier	Bebe Glazer	11 episodes
1994	Murphy Brown	Yvonne Bentley	Episode: "The Deal of the Art"
1994	The George Carlin Show	Anya	Episode: "George Helps Sydney"
1994	Good Advice	Marilyn	Episode: "Brother, Can You Spare a Date?"
1994–1995	The 5 Mrs. Buchanans	Vivian Buchanan	17 episodes
1995	The Crew	Loretta	Episode: "The Worst Noel"
1995–1996	Space: Above and Beyond	Ambassador Diane Hayden	2 episodes
1996	Sisters	Alam Klaus	Episode: "A Sudden Change of Heart"
1996	Chicago Hope	Mrs. Holgren	Episode: "Women on the Verge"
1996	Ellen	Claire	Episode: "Looking Out for Number One"
1997	Friends 'Til the End	Mrs. Boxer	Television movie
1997	Millennium	Maureen Murphy	Episode: "Loin Like a Hunting Flame"
1997	Murder, She Wrote: South by Southwest	Millie Ogden	Television movie
1997	Caroline in the City	Miss McGowan	Episode: "Caroline and the Desperate Cat"
1997–1998	Union Square	Suzanne Barkley	14 episodes
1998	The Practice	Ellen Blake	Episode: "The Pursuit of Dignity"
1998	Ally McBeal	Cheryl Bonner	Episode: "Happy Birthday, Baby"
1998	Maggie	Sister Anastasia	Episode: "If You Could See What I Hear"
1998	The Gregory Hines Show	Gloria	Episode: "Mug the One You're With"
1999–2000	Stark Raving Mad	Audrey Radford	4 episodes
2000	Diagnosis: Murder	Marisa Parkhurst	Episode: "Too Many Cooks"
2000	Family Law	Lois Nelson	Episode: "A Mother's Son"
2000	God, the Devil and Bob	Martha Stewart (voice)	Episode: "The Devil's Birthday"
2000	Love & Money	Kiki Farrington	2 episodes
2001	The Lot	Libby Wilson	3 episodes
2001	The Beast	Mrs. Sweeney	6 episodes
2002	Six Feet Under	Catherine Collins	2 episodes
2002	Bram & Alice	Margaret O'Connor	Episode: "Alice Doesn't Live Here Anymore"
2003–2004	It's All Relative	Audrey O'Neil	22 episodes
2004	Quintuplets	Ms. Hentschel	Episode: "Shakespeare in Lust"
2004	CSI: Crime Scene Investigation	Eva	Episode: "What's Eating Gilbert Grissom?"
2005	Strong Medicine	Governor Barbara Curtis	Episode: "It Takes a Clinic"
2005	Sex, Love & Secrets	Dulah	Episode: "Danger"
2005–2006, 2010–2011	Desperate Housewives	Felicia Tilman	28 episodes
2006	Help Me Help You	Dave's Mom	Episode: "Pink Freud"
2006	Ghost Whisperer	Marilyn Mandeville	Episode: "A Grave Matter"
2006	The Lost Room	Margaret Milne	2 episodes
2010	American Dad!	Mrs. Reagan (voice)	Episode: "Return of the Bling"
2011	Shake It Up	Dr. Pepper	Episode: "Shrink It Up"
2012	Electric City	(voice)	9 episodes
2012	Robot and Monster	Bea Holder (voice)	Episode: "Litterbug/Model Citizen"
2014	Submissions Only	Theresa Amsworth	2 episodes
2014	Wilfred	Lonnie Goldsmith	3 episodes
2016	Her Last Will	Dina Cotton	Television movie
2016	Supergirl	Sinead	Episode: "Worlds Finest"
2018	Dynasty	Adriana	Episode: "Queen of Cups"
2018	American Horror Story: Apocalypse	Madelyn Lurch	Episode: "Sojourn"
2020	Hollywood	Eleanor Roosevelt	Episode: "(Screen) Tests"
2020	Ratched	Ingrid	2 episodes
2020	Atlantic Crossing	Eleanor Roosevelt	8 episodes
2022	Hacks	Susan	Episode: "Retired"
2022	Werewolf by Night	Verussa Bloodstone	Television special
2022	The Mysterious Benedict Society	Rowena Two	Episode: "A Two-Way Street"
2023	Shining Vale	Dr. Siferr	3 episodes
2024	Clipped	Justine	5 episodes
2024	Frasier	Bebe Glazer	Episode: "The Squash Courtship of Freddy's Father"
2024, 2026	The Agency	Dr. Rachel Blake	Main role
2025	Long Bright River	Mrs. Mahon	5 episodes

== Stage ==
Year	Title	Role(s)	Notes	Ref.
1978	Mother Courage and Her Children	Performer		
1980	The White Devil	Vittoria		
1982	The Greeks, Part I: The War	Clytemnestra, chorus, slave		
1982	The Greeks, Part II: The Gods	Electra, Iphigenia		
1983	Christmas on Mars	Audrey		
1986	Hamlet	Ophelia		
1987	Man and Superman	Violet Robinson		
1988	Julius Caesar	Calpurnia		
1990	Macbeth	Lady Macduff		
1990	The Crucible	Elizabeth Proctor		
1990	What a Man Weighs	Ruth		
1991	Forgiving Typhoid Mary	Dr. Ann Saltzer		
1992	Bella, Belle of Byelorussia	Ludmilla, Waitress		
1992	Four Baboons Adoring the Sun	Understudy (Penny McKenzie)	Broadway debut	
1992	The Innocents' Crusade	Ms. Connell, Waitress, Ms. Cabot, Wendy, Helen		
1993	Jeffrey	performer		
1995	London Suite	Mrs. Semple, Diana, Mrs. Sitgood		
1998	The Last Night of Ballyhoo	Reba		
2001	The Man Who Came to Dinner	Maggie Cutler	Broadway	
2001	Rude Entertainment	Katinka, Eleanor		
2002	Thoroughly Modern Millie	Mrs. Meers	Broadway	
2005	On the Town	Madame Maude P. Dilly		
2006	Never Gonna Dance	Mabel Pritt		
2006	Mame	Vera		
2007	The Glass Menagerie	Amanda Wingfield		
2007	Old Acquaintance	Mildred Watson Drake	Broadway	
2008	Cry-Baby	Mrs. Vernon-Williams	Broadway	
2008	Not Waving	Patsy		
2009	Pippin	Berthe		
2009	Unusual Acts of Devotion	Josie		
2009	Noises Off	Dotty Otley		
2009	On the Town	Madame Maude P. Dilly		
2010	Present Laughter	Monica Reed	Broadway	
2010	Sweeney Todd: The Demon Barber of Fleet Street	Mrs. Lovett		
2010	Love, Loss, and What I Wore	performer		
2011	In Mother Words	performer		
2011	Yeast Nation	Jan the Unnamed		
2012	Hay Fever	Judith Bliss		
2013	Rodgers + Hammerstein's Cinderella	Madame/Stepmother	Broadway	
2014	Show Boat	Parthy Ann		
2014	Little Me	Mrs. Eggleston		
2015	It Shoulda Been You	Georgette	Broadway	
2016	Hollywood	Charlotte Selby		
2016	Roads to Home	Vonnie Hayhurst		
2017	Arsenic and Old Lace	Abby Brewster		
2018	The Low Road	Mrs. Trewitt, others		
2018	Me and My Girl	Maria, Duchess of Dene		
2018	The Royal Family of Broadway	Fanny		
2018	The Actor's Nightmare	Sarah		
2018	Sister Mary Ignatius Explains It All for You	Sister Mary Ignatius		
2018	The Rivals	Mrs. Malaprop		
2019	The Skin of Our Teeth	Mrs. Antrobus		
2019	Judgment Day	Frau Liemgruber		
2020	Conscience	Margaret Chase Smith		
2021	The Importance of Being Earnest	Lady Bracknell		
2021	Eleanor	Eleanor Roosevelt		
2024	Once Upon a Mattress	Queen Aggravain	Encores!	

== Awards and nominations ==
Year	Award	Category	Work	Result	Ref.
1992	Drama Desk Award	Outstanding Featured Actress in a Play	Bella, Belle of Byelorussia	Nominated	
1993	Drama Desk Award	Outstanding Featured Actress in a Play	Jeffrey	Nominated	
2002	Tony Award	Best Featured Actress in a Musical	Thoroughly Modern Millie	Won	
2002	Drama Desk Award	Outstanding Featured Actress In A Musical	Thoroughly Modern Millie	Won	
2008	Outer Critics Circle Award	Outstanding Featured Actress In A Musical	Cry-Baby	Nominated	
2017	Drama League Award	Distinguished Performance	The Roads to Home	Nominated	
2018	Drama League Award	Distinguished Performance	The Low Road	Nominated	
2018	Outer Critics Circle Award	Outstanding Featured Actress in a Play	The Low Road	Nominated	
2022	Primetime Emmy Awards	Outstanding Guest Actress in a Comedy Series	Hacks	Nominated	
2023	Critics' Choice Super Awards	Best Villain in a Series	Werewolf by Night	Nominated	
