= Fire and Reign =

- American Horror Story episode
- Episode no.: Season 8 Episode 9
- Directed by: Jennifer Arnold
- Written by: Asha Michelle Wilson
- Production code: 8ATS09
- Original air date: November 7, 2018
- Running time: 38 minutes

Guest appearances
- Frances Conroy as Myrtle Snow; Taissa Farmiga as Zoe Benson; Gabourey Sidibe as Queenie; Billy Eichner as Mutt Nutter; Billy Porter as Behold Chablis; Mark Ivanir as Nicholas II of Russia; Emilia Ares as Anastasia Nikolaevna of Russia; Yevgeniy Kartashov as Yakov Yurovsky; Joan Collins as Bubbles McGee

Episode chronology
← Previous "Sojourn"	Next → "Apocalypse Then"
- American Horror Story: Apocalypse

"Fire and Reign" is the ninth episode of the eighth season of the anthology television series American Horror Story. It aired on November 7, 2018, on the cable network FX. The episode was written by Asha Michelle Wilson, and directed by Jennifer Arnold.

== Plot ==
Having made a deal with the Antichrist, Dinah Stevens breaks a protective spell that Cordelia placed on Miss Robichaux's Academy, letting Michael and Mead in. Together, they murder most of the witches, including Zoe, Queenie, and Bubbles, but Cordelia, Myrtle, and Mallory escape. Michael meets with Jeff and Mutt who present him with the Cooperative, an organization of elites who sold their souls to Satan in exchange for worldly gifts – formerly known as the Illuminati. They begin to devise plans for the end of the world and Ms. Venable is made the administrator of Outpost 3.

Cordelia, Myrtle, Mallory, Madison, and Coco take refuge in Misty Day's shack. Cordelia is devastated as she fails to resurrect the murdered witches, and Madison reveals that Michael has the capability to erase souls from existence. Myrtle reveals that there might be a way to bring the dead witches back via a time-travel spell known as Tempus infinitum, but mentions that every attempt to perform such a feat resulted in death. Myrtle believes Mallory possesses such power and asks her to travel back in time to save Anastasia Romanov (a witch) from execution. Mallory successfully travels back in time but is unable to save Anastasia.

Because of Mallory's near success, Cordelia contemplates dying to let Mallory rise as the Supreme, and therefore secure the success of the spell. Myrtle discourages her, certain that she has some fight left. The witches travel to California to seek aid from Behold and John Henry, only to find them and their students murdered (presumably by Michael and Mead).

Michael and Mead meets with the Cooperative, where they begin to gather information about the Outposts and start the plan for the Apocalypse.

== Reception ==
"Fire and Reign" was watched by 1.65 million people during its original broadcast, and gained a 0.8 ratings share among adults aged 18–49.

The episode received mixed reviews. On the review aggregator Rotten Tomatoes, "Fire and Reign" holds a 53% approval rating, based on 17 reviews with an average rating of 6.90/10. The critical consensus reads: "Not even a pitch-perfect reference to Omen III could keep Apocalypse's penultimate episode from succumbing to the franchise's penchant for uneven pacing and meandering character arcs."

Ron Hogan of Den of Geek gave the episode a 3/5, saying, "Despite my issue with [the possibility of time travel], the episode itself has a lot of positives. The scenes with Mutt (Billy Eichner) and Jeff (Evan Peters) are broad, but they're a funny exaggeration of tech bro culture. The two actors have a solid delivery of big comedy lines, and they're a good counterbalance to the more unpleasant aspects of the episode. Billie Lourd is exceptional this week, and her screaming fit after being dragged from Tsarist Russia back to the present is powerful. She's in a full-fledged shrieking panic, and it's a great cap on a very interesting flashback scene." He added, "Jennifer Arnold has a solid hand with the actors, but a better hand with the action sequences that take place this week."

Kat Rosenfield from Entertainment Weekly gave the episode a C+. As the episode is the penultimate of the season, she criticized the fact that it was "still mired in backstory", as it was giving the impression of an "endless scene-setting". She was also disappointed by many story elements like the reason why Dinah chose to help Michael and Mead; the easy explanation given for the apocalypse; and the fact that time travel might be the solution to stop the Antichrist. She disliked the cliffhanger of the episode, commenting that it was just "people in very silly hats flipping to Page 6 of their End of Days marketing binders." Finally, she was unimpressed by the Bolshevik revolution flashback, and the revelation that Anastasia Romanova was a witch.

Vulture's Ziwe Fumudoh gave the episode a 5 out of 5. Much like Rosenfield, she was disappointed by Dinah and the reason she helped Michael and Mead, calling it "underwhelming". She also criticized Michael for being "as directionless as a boat with no sails, rudder, or Sperrys.", and was left unimpressed by the Bolshevik revolution flashback. However, she enjoyed Robot Mead and her role in the killing of witches, commenting she has "a fancy design feature that is both functional and terrifying". She was also a fan of the scenes between Mutt (Eichner), Jeff (Peters) and Venable (Paulson). Overall, she appreciated the episode, thinking that it covered a lot of ground and that "this season of American Horror Story is coming together".
