= Herzl (play) =

1976 play by Dore Schary and Amos Elon

- Written by: Dore Schary; Amos Elon
- Original language: English

Premiere
- Date premiered: 30 November 1976
- Place premiered: Palace Theatre

Herzl is a 1976 play written by Dore Schary and Amos Elon based on the biography written by Elon. The show opened at the Palace Theatre, Broadway on November 30, 1976, and closed on December 5, 1976, after eight performances.

== Setting ==
It is set in the years 1891–1897 in Vienna, Paris, Constantinople, Berlin, Vilna, Rome, and Basel.

== Plot ==
The show follows the life of the founder of political Zionism, with its characters and plot based on historical fact.

=== 1976 Broadway production ===
The show was directed by J. Ranelli, with scenery by Douglas W. Schmidt, costumes by Pearl Somner, lighting by John Gleason, production stage manager Frank Marino, stage manager Judith Binus, and press by Louis Sica, Suzanne Salter, and John Springer Associates, Inc.

The cast included Paul Hecht (Theodor Herzl), Louis Zorich (Moritz Benedikt), Stephan Mark Weyte (Hermann Bahr, Ibrahim), William Kiehl (Captain Henruach, Kaiser Wilheim), John Michalski (Heinrich Kana, Sultan, Arthur Schnitzler), Leo Bloom (Russian General), Roy K. Stevens (Rabbi Gudeman), Jack Axelrod (Edouard Bacher), Eunice Anderson (Jeanette Herzl), Roger DeKoven (Jakob Herzl), Judith Light (Julie Herzl), Rebecca Schull (Nursemaid), Ralph Byers (Nachum Sokolov), Mitchell Jason (David Wolffsohn), Richard Seff (Baron De Hirsch, Pope Pius X), Ellen Tovatt (Fraulein Keller), Lester Rawlins (Count Paul Nevlinski), David Tress (Menachem Issishkin), and Saylor Creswell (Martin Buber).
