= Audrey Marie Hilley =

American murderer (1933–1987)

- Born: Audrey Marie Frazier; June 4, 1933; Anniston, Alabama, US
- Died: February 26, 1987 (aged 53); Blue Mountain, Alabama, US
- Convictions: 1983
- Criminal charges: Murder, attempted murder
- Penalty: Life in prison (murder); 20 years (attempted murder)
- Escaped: February 22, 1987
- Escape end: February 26, 1987

Audrey Marie Hilley (née Frazier, later Homan; June 4, 1933 – February 26, 1987), also known by the aliases Robbi Hannon and Teri Martin, was an American murderer and suspected serial killer. She was suspected in the death by poisoning of her husband and the attempted murder of her daughter, and spent three years as a fugitive from justice. Her life and crime spree are the subjects of the 1991 telefilm Wife, Mother, Murderer.

== Early life and first crimes ==
Audrey Marie Hilley was born Audrey Marie Frazier in the Blue Mountain neighborhood of Anniston, Alabama on June 4, 1933. Her parents were Huey Frazier and his wife, Lucille (née Meads). She married Frank Hilley on May 8, 1951; they had two children, Mike and Carol. Despite Frank's well-paying job and Marie's secretarial employment, the couple had little money set aside in savings due to Marie's excessive spending habits, leading to tension in the marriage. Unbeknownst to Frank, his wife frequently engaged in sex with her bosses in exchange for money or superior performance evaluations. Frank began suffering from a mysterious illness, as did his son Mike, but Mike's symptoms – which his doctors attributed to stomach flu – abruptly stopped when he moved away to attend a seminary.

In 1975, after returning home early due to his illness, Frank found Marie in bed with her boss. He turned to Mike, then an ordained minister living in Atlanta, for advice. In May 1975, shortly after a visit from Mike, Frank visited his doctor complaining of nausea and tenderness in his abdomen, being diagnosed with a viral stomach ache. The condition persisted and he was admitted to a hospital, where tests indicated a malfunction of the liver; doctors diagnosed infectious hepatitis. Frank Hilley died early in the morning of May 25, 1975.

Frank's autopsy, performed with his wife's permission, revealed swelling of the kidneys and lungs, bilateral pneumonia, and inflammation of the stomach. Because the symptoms closely resembled those of hepatitis, that was listed as his cause of death and no further tests were conducted. Frank had maintained a moderate life insurance policy, secretly taken out by Marie at the time of his initial illness, that she redeemed for US$31,140 (equivalent to $186,300 in 2025).

Three years later, Marie took out a $25,000 life insurance policy on her daughter Carol; an additional $25,000 accidental death rider took effect that August, for a total of US$50,000 (equivalent to $246,800 in 2025). Within a few months, Carol began experiencing nausea and was admitted to the emergency room several times. A year after filing the insurance policy on her daughter, Marie gave her an injection that she claimed would alleviate the nausea. However, the symptoms only worsened, with Carol enduring numbness in her extremities. After medical tests found no disease, Carol's physician, fearing the symptoms were psychosomatic, had her undergo psychiatric testing at Carraway Methodist Hospital in Birmingham. There, Carol secretly received two more injections from her mother, who warned her not to tell others about the shots.

A month after Carol was admitted to the hospital, her physician reported she was suffering from malnutrition and vitamin deficiencies, adding that he suspected heavy metal poisoning was to blame for the symptoms. Panicking, Marie had Carol discharged from the hospital that afternoon. The following day, Carol was admitted to the University of Alabama Hospital. Coincidentally, Marie was arrested for check kiting; they were written to the insurance company that insured Carol's life, causing that policy to lapse. University physicians concentrated their investigation on the possibility of heavy metal poisoning, noting that Carol's hands and feet were numb, she had nerve palsy causing foot drop and she had lost most of her deep tendon reflexes.

== Arrest ==
Physicians noticed Aldrich-Mees lines – indicating certain types of poisons – on Carol's nails. Forensic tests on samples of her hair were conducted by the Alabama Department of Forensic Sciences on October 3, 1979, revealing arsenic levels ranging from over 100 times the normal level close to the scalp to zero times the normal level at the end of the hair shaft. This indicated that Carol had been given increasingly larger doses of arsenic over a period of four to eight months. That same day, Frank's body was exhumed, and upon examination, showed between ten and 100 times the normal level of arsenic. It was concluded that both Frank and Carol had suffered from chronic arsenic poisoning, with Frank's poisoning being fatal.

Marie was incarcerated on her check-kiting charges when she was arrested on October 9 for the attempted murder of her daughter. Anniston police found a vial in her purse, tests of which revealed the presence of arsenic. Two weeks later, Frank's sister found a jar of rat poison which contained 1.4–1.5% arsenic. On November 9, Marie was released on bail, after which she registered at a local motel under an assumed name and disappeared. While a note was left behind indicating that she "might have been kidnapped", Marie was listed as a fugitive.

== Escape ==
On November 19, a burglary occurred at the home of Marie's aunt. The occupant's car was stolen as well as some clothes and an overnight bag. Investigators found a note in the house reading, "Do not call police. We will burn you out if you do. We found what we wanted and will not bother you again."

Two months later, on January 11, 1980, Marie was indicted in absentia for Frank's murder. Subsequently, investigators found that both her mother and her mother-in-law, Carrie Hilley, had significant, but not fatal, traces of arsenic in their systems when they died. The remains of Sonya Marcelle Gibson, an 11-year-old friend of Carol's who had died of indeterminate causes in 1974, were also exhumed and examined, but were found to contain only a "normal" amount of arsenic. Gibson was one of the many neighborhood children who had fallen ill after drinking beverages that they had been given during visits to the Hilley household. Two police officers who had been dispatched to a domestic disturbance at the Hilley household also reported coming down with nausea and stomach cramps after drinking coffee that Marie had offered them. Although police and the FBI launched a massive manhunt, Marie Hilley remained a fugitive for a little more than three years.

== New identities ==
Under the alias "Robbi Hannon", Marie travelled to Florida and met a man named John Greenleaf Homan III. They lived together for more than a year before marrying on May 29, 1981, at which point she took his last name. The couple moved to New Hampshire. Late in the summer of 1982, she left New Hampshire, telling her husband that she needed to attend to family business and to see some doctors about an illness. During this time, she travelled to Florida and Texas using the alias "Teri Martin", an imaginary twin sister.

During the trip, Marie called Homan as "Teri" and informed him that Robbi had died in Texas, saying there was no need for him to claim the body because it had been donated to medical science. After getting to know "Teri" over the phone, Homan expressed interest in meeting her. She agreed, saying he needed to put "Robbi's" death behind them. In November 1982, after changing her hair color and losing weight, Marie returned to New Hampshire and reunited with Homan, posing as his "deceased" wife's sister.

An obituary for Robbi Homan appeared in a New Hampshire newspaper, but aroused suspicion when police were unable to verify any of the information it contained. Homan's coworkers also had suspicions about his new "sister-in-law" and were concerned defalcation may have been at play. A detective with the New Hampshire State Police surmised that the woman living as Teri and Robbi were one and the same. Homan's concerned co-workers discovered that the Medical Research Institute of Texas, where "Robbi's" body was supposedly handed over for study, was nonexistent, as was the church that eulogized her death.

While Homan's workplace was audited and no embezzlement found, authorities still believed that "Teri Martin" was possibly a fugitive bank robber named Carol Manning (later disproven) or wanted on other outstanding charges. In the meantime, "Teri" had taken a secretarial job in nearby Brattleboro, Vermont, and was arrested. While being interrogated by Vermont state troopers, she confessed that she was wanted in Alabama on check kiting charges and divulged her true name. Contact with Alabama authorities confirmed this, while also disclosing the far more serious charges for murder and attempted murder. Marie was extradited to Alabama, in January 1983, to stand trial. She was found guilty, then sentenced on June 19, 1983, to life in prison for her husband's murder and 20 years for attempting to kill her daughter.

== Incarceration and death ==
Marie began serving her sentence in 1983 at the Julia Tutwiler Prison for Women in Wetumpka, Alabama, a maximum security prison. Due to her clerical career, she was often assigned to perform paperwork and was considered a quiet model prisoner. This good behavior earned her several one-day passes from prison, from which she returned as scheduled.

In February 1987, Marie was given a three-day pass to visit Homan, who had moved to Anniston to be closer to his wife. They spent a day at an Anniston motel, and when Homan left for a few hours, she disappeared, leaving behind a note asking for his forgiveness. Homan promptly alerted police. Her escape prompted an inquiry into Alabama's furlough policy.

Four days after she vanished from the motel, Marie was found delirious on the back porch of a house in Anniston. The woman who found Marie described her appearance as scary, stating she was dirty with mud on her face and long fingernails. She alerted police, who then summoned paramedics. Marie was conscious at the scene but lost consciousness while being transported to a nearby hospital for treatment. Upon arrival she suffered a heart attack. Doctors attempted to revive her but were unsuccessful, and she was pronounced dead 3 1/2 hours after being found. The coroner believed she had been crawling around in the woods, drenched by four days of frequent rain and exposed to temperatures that dropped to around freezing. Her final cause of death was attributed to hypothermia and exposure.

== See also ==
- Blanche Taylor Moore
- Stacey Castor
- Velma Barfield
- Judy Buenoano
