= Çiğdem Selışık Onat =

Turkish actress (born 1939)

- Born: Çiğdem Selışık; 14 May 1939 (age 87); Ankara, Turkey
- Education: Istanbul University Faculty of Literature
- Occupation: Actress

Çiğdem Selışık Onat (born 14 May 1939) is a Turkish actress.

== Life and career ==
Selışık Onat was born in Ankara in 1939. After finishing her studies at Robert College, she enrolled in Istanbul University's School of Literature. While continuing with her studies, she became one of the founders of Genç Oyuncular, a movement focused on bringing together young stage actors from different universities and schools across Turkey. She subsequently started working at Kenter Theatre and Ankara State Theatre. She got her master's degree from the University of North Carolina at Chapel Hill. She continued her doctorate program on comparative drama studies at the same university. She continued her career in the United States by both appearing and staging a number of plays at Lincoln Center and the New York University Tisch School of the Arts. In Turkey, she worked as a director at the Istanbul City Theatres. Her portrayal of Signora Fioria in the play The Time of the Cuckoo, which was staged at Lincoln Center, earned her a nomination for the Drama Desk Award for Outstanding Featured Actress in a Play in 2000.

During her nearly forty-year career as an educator she taught various theatre and acting courses at the University of North Carolina School of the Arts and graduate acting classes at the New York University Tisch School of the Arts. She also taught acting and drama courses at Koç University for about 4 years.

== Selected filmography ==
Film
Year	Title	Role	Notes
2015	Çırak	Makbule	
2016	İstanbul Kırmızısı	Süreyya Soysal	
2017	Yol Ayrımı	Firdevs	
2019	Çiçero		
Television
2018	Ufak Tefek Cinayetler	Tomris	TV series
2018	Hakan: Muhafız	Azra	Netflix original series
2019	Kardeş Çocukları	Rezzan	TV series
2020–2021	Uyanış: Büyük Selçuklu	Seferiye Hatun	TV series
2021	Hamlet	Amelia	GAİN original series
2022	Alef	İsmihan	BluTV original series
2023	Ne Gemiler Yaktım	Neriman	TV series

== Awards and nominations ==
Year	Award	Work	Category	Result	Notes
2000	Drama Desk Award	The Time of the Cuckoo	Outstanding Featured Actress in a Play	Nominated	
2015	52nd Antalya International Film Festival	Çırak	Best Supporting Actress	Won	
2016	27th Ankara International Film Festival	Çırak	Best Supporting Actress	Won	
2017	50th Turkish Film Critics Association Awards	Yol Ayrımı	Best Supporting Actress	Nominated	
