= Valerie Solanas Died for Your Sins: Scumbag =

- American Horror Story episode
- Episode no.: Season 7 Episode 7
- Directed by: Rachel Goldberg
- Written by: Crystal Liu
- Production code: 7ATS07
- Original air date: October 17, 2017
- Running time: 44 minutes

Guest appearances
- Billy Eichner as Harrison Wilton; Lena Dunham as Valerie Solanas; Frances Conroy as Bebe Babbitt; Adina Porter as Beverly Hope; Jamie Brewer as Hedda; Dot-Marie Jones as Butchy May; Steve Bannos as Desk Officer; Chaz Bono as Gary Longstreet; Lyla Porter-Follows as Young Bebe

Episode chronology
← Previous "Mid-Western Assassin"	Next → "Winter of Our Discontent"
- American Horror Story: Cult

"Valerie Solanas Died for Your Sins: Scumbag" is the seventh episode of the seventh season of the anthology television series American Horror Story. It aired on October 17, 2017, on the cable network FX. The episode was written by Crystal Liu, and directed by Rachel Goldberg.

== Plot ==
A news report unveils that Meadow has been identified as the shooter and Ally has been arrested. Harrison reads a prepared statement in regard to Meadow's actions, inciting Trump's victory as her motive. Kai is polling ahead and is the apparent winner of the city council seat.

Beverly, Ivy, and Winter meet a woman named Bebe Babbitt, former lover of radical feminist Valerie Solanas. Valerie sought to murder all men with the exception of gay men, deemed "gender-traitors". Among her targets was iconic artist and filmmaker Andy Warhol. Valerie's attempted assassination of Warhol launched a series of attacks by SCUM (the Society for Cutting Up Men) on couples, making a statement to women that "partnering with men would only get you killed". These attacks were accredited to the never-identified Zodiac Killer by the police and the media. Valerie discovered that gay male SCUM member Bruce wrote and sent the Zodiac Killer letters to the press. SCUM dismembered Bruce in retaliation. Valerie eventually presented herself to the police to take credit for the Zodiac killings but she was dismissed as delusional. Her schizophrenia began to intensify afterwards and SCUM disassembled as a result. Valerie's legacy became tied with shooting Warhol.

The day after, Winter finds Kai communing with their mummified parents. Winter tells Kai that she is not content with every action of his but that she still loves and supports him. Kai questions her loyalty and asks her about a copy of the SCUM Manifesto that he had found in her room. She dismisses it as an old college textbook. Kai tells her that the book inspired him to come up with his own acronym: FIT (Fear Is Truth). He notes that Harrison came up with MLWB (Men Lead, Women Bleed). That night, Beverly, Ivy, and Winter lure Harrison to the Butchery and Ivy dismembers him with a chainsaw.

Beverly reports on Harrison's corpse and suggests to the public that Kai's promise of law and order is not being kept. Kai and Bebe watch Beverly on the news together in his basement, revealing that Kai has been manipulating the others all along.

== Reception ==
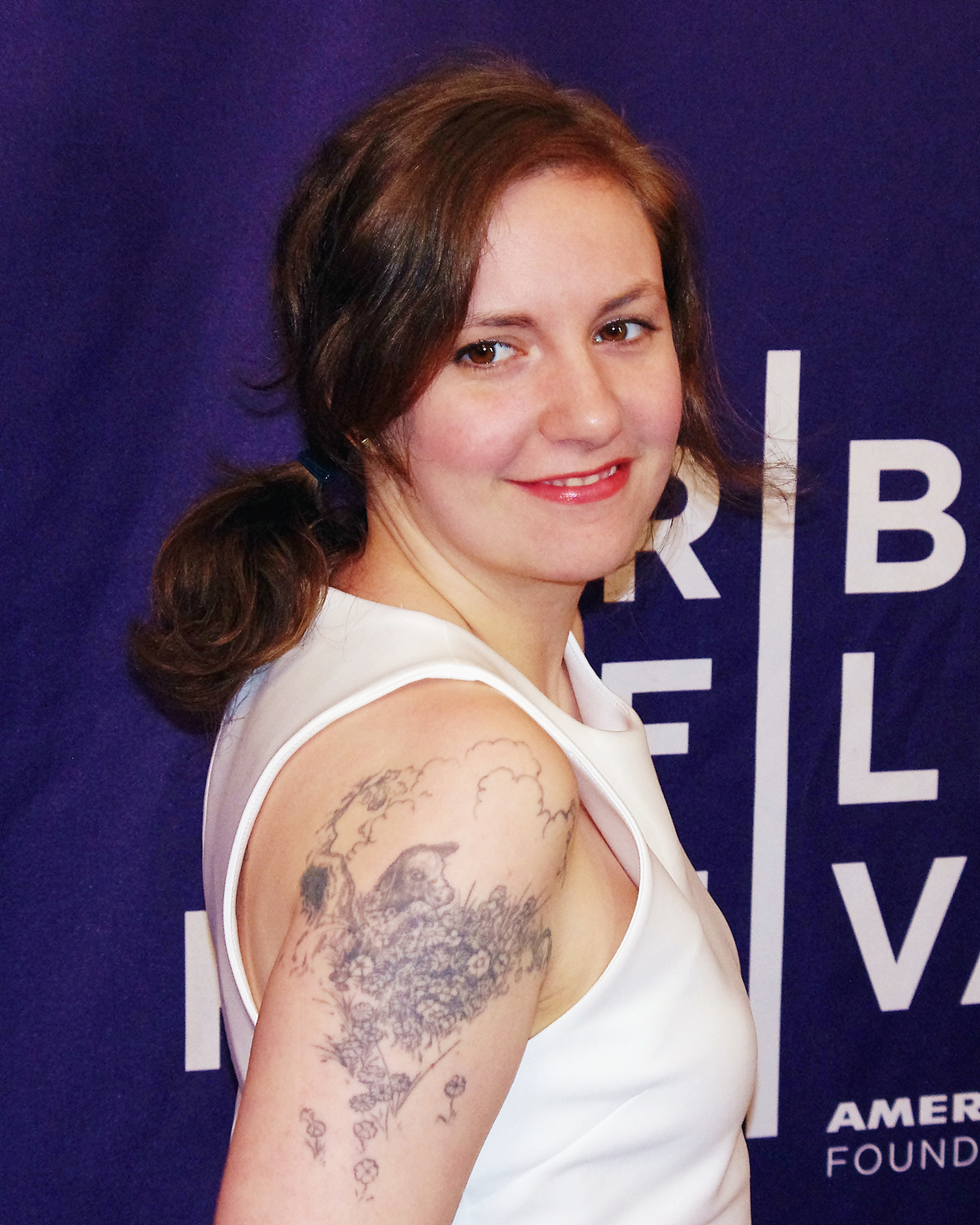
Lena Dunham's portrayal of Valerie Solanas received mixed reviews from critics.

"Valerie Solanas Died for Your Sins: Scumbag" was watched by 2.07 million people during its original broadcast, and gained a 1.0 ratings share among adults aged 18–49.

The episode received mostly positive reviews from critics. On the review aggregator Rotten Tomatoes, "Valerie Solanas Died for Your Sins: Scumbag" holds an 86% approval rating, based on 14 reviews with an average rating of 7.0 out of 10.

Tony Sokol of Den of Geek gave the episode a 3.5 out of 5, saying "Fear is trust, after all, and American Horror Story: Cult puts its trust in historical hijackings to scare us into bringing the past into the fiction. "Valerie Solanas Died for Your Sins: Scumbag" is a departure in that it's a flashback, but it shows all manifestos are one manifesto and it's pretty scary how both sides can use the same book. It is an educational episode, but after last week's explosive making of an assassin, it slows the momentum."

Kat Rosenfield from Entertainment Weekly gave the episode a A−, and particularly praised Frances Conroy's presence in the episode. However, she mentioned that some flashbacks were a bit long, but that Dunham's performance made them worthwhile. She also enjoyed the last scene and its plot twist. Vulture's Brian Moylan gave the episode a 2 out of 5, with a negative review, and called it "the weakest episode of an otherwise strong season." He criticized the flashbacks, saying they were "jumping through narrative hoops in order to accommodate a famous guest star", and was bored by the rest of the scenes. However, he praised the twist at the end, calling it "the only thing that saves this episode."

Matt Fowler of IGN gave the episode a 7.0 out of 10, with a mostly positive review. He said "American Horror Story broke away a bit from its central narrative to bring an entirely new, and competing, cult into the mix. Using (too many) flashbacks, featuring Lena Dunham as SCUM Movement leader Valerie Solanas, Cult officially worked to separate Kai from all of his followers in an ultimate mind game meant to drive him toward world domination. It was an interesting detour but it made for a stifling episode that needed a few more scenes in the present to sell us on everyone believably adopting a new killer ideology."

== See also ==
- Zodiac Killer in popular culture
