= Holes (American Horror Story) =

- American Horror Story episode
- Episode no.: Season 7 Episode 5
- Directed by: Maggie Kiley
- Written by: Crystal Liu
- Production code: 7ATS05
- Original air date: October 3, 2017
- Running time: 41 minutes

Guest appearances
- Billy Eichner as Harrison Wilton; Adina Porter as Beverly Hope; Leslie Grossman as Meadow Wilton; Colton Haynes as Det. Jack Samuels; Dermot Mulroney as Bob Thompson; James Morosini as R.J.; Laura Allen as Rosie; Ron Melendez as Mark; Grant Albrecht as Scott Anderson; Chaz Bono as Gary Longstreet; Cooper Dodson as Oz Mayfair-Richards

Episode chronology
← Previous "11/9"	Next → "Mid-Western Assassin"
- American Horror Story: Cult

"Holes" is the fifth episode of the seventh season of the anthology television series American Horror Story. It aired on October 3, 2017, on the cable network FX. The episode was written by Crystal Liu, and directed by Maggie Kiley.

== Plot ==
Beverly informs Kai that Bob is compromising news coverage of the clown murders and thereby hindering Kai's campaign. Kai, Beverly, Winter, Harrison, Detective Samuels, Ivy, Gary, and Beverly's cameraman, RJ, don clown masks, break into Bob's house, and kill him and a gimp he has suspended in his attic.

Ivy and RJ are deeply disturbed by the murders. Beverly later advises Kai to cut ties with RJ, whom she views as a weak link. Each cult member, beginning with Ivy, shoots a tied-up RJ in the head with a nail gun before Kai finishes him off.

Ally sees Meadow lying in an open grave in her backyard. Meadow pleads to Ally for safety from the cult and lets it slip that Ivy is a member.

Beverly probes Kai about the whereabouts of his parents and Kai divulges that his mom shot his abusive father and then herself in a murder–suicide. Dr. Rudy Vincent, revealed to be Kai and Winter's older brother, insisted that they cover up their deaths in order to protect his career and continue receiving their mom's pension and their dad's disability checks.

== Reception ==
"Holes" was watched by 2.20 million people during its original broadcast, and gained a 1.1 ratings share among adults aged 18–49.

The episode received positive reviews from critics. On the review aggregator Rotten Tomatoes, "Holes" holds an 86% approval rating, based on 14 reviews with an average rating of 7.8 out of 10.

Tony Sokol of Den of Geek gave the episode a 4 out of 5, saying "American Horror Story finds its scares in likely and unlikely places. The real world is much scarier than the supernatural one, especially when society is being shaped in a monster’s image by a monster politician. It’s easy to control the population through fear. [...] American Horror Story has a formula that runs arc-wide. We’ve learned who the conspirators are and now we will get to see the conspiracy. It feels like the trap that’s been set for Ally will be pulled soon."

Kat Rosenfield from Entertainment Weekly gave the episode a B+, and appreciated that it was "connecting some very important dots". Moreover, she enjoyed the reveal of Kai's backstory as well as the twist on the identity of his brother. Vulture's Brian Moylan gave the episode a 4 out of 5, indicating a positive review. He praised in particular the character of Kai Anderson, and the twists of the episode. Finally, he gave a positive comment on the overall structure of the season, calling it "much better and more logical" than the past seasons.

Matt Fowler of IGN gave the episode a 7.8 out of 10, with a positive review. He said "Cult found solid footing with "Holes" and its angle focusing on the villains' side of the mass hoax, but it's best we don't linger here too long. Repetitive ruts have been American Horror Story's bane for years now as the show operates best when it's not delivering the same thing week after week. It's what sunk Roanoke, ultimately."
