= Mid-Western Assassin =

- American Horror Story episode
- Episode no.: Season 7 Episode 6
- Directed by: Bradley Buecker
- Written by: Todd Kubrak
- Production code: 7ATS06
- Original air date: October 10, 2017
- Running time: 44 minutes

Guest appearances
- Billy Eichner as Harrison Wilton; Mare Winningham as Sally Keffler; Adina Porter as Beverly Hope; Leslie Grossman as Meadow Wilton; Colton Haynes as Det. Jack Samuels; Chaz Bono as Gary Longstreet

Episode chronology
← Previous "Holes"	Next → "Valerie Solanas Died for Your Sins: Scumbag"
- American Horror Story: Cult

"Mid-Western Assassin" is the sixth episode of the seventh season of the anthology television series American Horror Story. It aired on October 10, 2017, on the cable network FX. The episode was written by Todd Kubrak, and directed by Bradley Buecker.

== Plot ==
A mass shooting occurs at Kai Anderson's political rally. He appears to have been shot and several people are killed. The police arrive and Ally is shown holding the gun.

Earlier, Meadow Wilton tells Ally Mayfair-Richards that Ally is being targeted by a cult, of which her wife Ivy is a member, before Meadow is dragged away. Ally sneaks over to the Wilton's house and finds Meadow tied up. Ally rescues Meadow and takes her to the Mayfair-Richards' restaurant. Meadow tells Ally that the cult has been responsible for the events that happened to Ally recently, and explains why Ivy hates Ally and hence joined the cult. She also explains she fell in love with Kai, but after realizing the feeling wasn't reciprocated, she attempted to leave the cult but was caught.

A flashback to the day after the 2016 presidential election reveals that Ivy admitted to Kai that she hates Ally ever since their son Oz was born, as Ivy is infertile, and Ally wouldn't let her feed Oz. Kai uses this to manipulate Ivy into supporting him, and they plot on how Ivy can leave Ally while gaining full custody of Oz.

After leaving Meadow with Dr. Rudy Vincent, so Rudy can question Meadow and be Ally's witness, Ally goes to see Sally Keffler, a rival candidate to Kai, and tells her about the cult, which Sally believes. However, the cult arrive and Kai kills Sally, making her death appear like suicide. Ally hides, but is found by Ivy. However, Ivy doesn't notify the cult. When Ally returns to Rudy, he says Meadow left after, unknown to Rudy, she got a call from Kai. Rudy doesn't believe Ally about the cult.

At the rally, it's revealed Meadow was responsible for the shooting. When Ally tries to stop her, she reveals she is still loyal to Kai, and loves him. She then shoots herself. Kai is shown to have survived.

== Production ==
On October 7, 2017, it was confirmed that the sixth episode of the season would be edited as a direct result of the 2017 Las Vegas shooting that occurred six days earlier. The episode originally featured a scene lasting 2 minutes and 16 seconds where Leslie Grossman's character Meadow Wilton begins to fire at Evan Peters' character, as well as a crowd, during a campaign speech. The episode was edited to de-emphasize the violence and to mostly have it featured completely off-screen - as a result the opening sequence of the episode was cut in half, several on-screen deaths were removed and two separate close-up shots of the handgun firing were removed.

While only the edited episode was broadcast on FX, the original uncut episode was released via VOD, FXNOW and FX+.

== Reception ==
"Mid-Western Assassin" was watched by 2.15 million people during its original broadcast, and gained a 1.0 ratings share among adults aged 18–49.

The episode received positive reviews from critics. On the review aggregator Rotten Tomatoes, "Mid-Western Assassin" holds an 82% approval rating, based on 17 reviews with an average rating of 7.52 out of 10.

Tony Sokol of Den of Geek gave the episode a 4.5 out of 5, saying "The episode is explosive, obviously, but the subtle machinations of the making of a murderess also helps show the implosion of the political body. The audience sees what the voters see. Violence can erupt at any time, regardless of crime statistics. But we also see how anyone can be a killer, even the bad neighbor next door."

Kat Rosenfield from Entertainment Weekly gave the episode a B, and enjoyed Ivy's flashback and the reason behind her hate for Ally. However, she also criticized the constant reuse of some sets, like the Butchery's. Vulture's Brian Moylan gave the episode a 3 out of 5, with a mixed to positive review. He praised the character of Meadow and the statements made by this season and this episode, especially about gun violence and "the fear-mongering Trumpian dystopia that we’re living in and the myopic identity politics of the liberal elite". However, contrary to Rosenfield, he criticized the character of Ivy and the reason that made her join the cult. He also expressed some doubts about why the cult decided to target Ally.

Matt Fowler of IGN gave the episode a 7.6 out of 10, with a positive review. He said "Cult remains steady in its storytelling, using a behind-the-scenes look at Kai's demented movement to show us just how the general public's strings are being pulled. With this episode ending in a final gruesome stunt (that unfortunately hits very close to home, headline-wise) designed to catapult Kai to the top of politics, we're due for a bit of a reset. If one doesn't come, let's hope this episode marks a turning point for the season in some way."
