= Drink the Kool-Aid (American Horror Story) =

- American Horror Story episode
- Episode no.: Season 7 Episode 9
- Directed by: Angela Bassett
- Written by: Adam Penn
- Production code: 7ATS09
- Original air date: October 31, 2017
- Running time: 50 minutes

Guest appearances
- Adina Porter as Beverly Hope; Chaz Bono as Gary Longstreet; Cameron Cowperthwaite as Speedwagon; Cooper Dodson as Oz Mayfair-Richards

Episode chronology
← Previous "Winter of Our Discontent"	Next → "Charles (Manson) in Charge"
- American Horror Story: Cult

"Drink the Kool-Aid" is the ninth episode of the seventh season of the anthology television series American Horror Story. It aired on October 31, 2017, on the cable network FX. The episode was written by Adam Penn, and directed by Angela Bassett.

== Plot ==
Kai recounts the affairs of infamous cults and their leaders including Heaven's Gate, Branch Davidians, and the Peoples Temple. After affirming the loyalty of his militiamen, Kai declares his intention to run for Senate at a city council meeting.

Winter explains her plan on how to escape a cult to Ally and Ivy. Before they can set a plan in motion, Ally, Ivy, and Winter are escorted to the Anderson house by Speedwagon and the other militiamen and led to the basement where Beverly attacks Winter for blaming Samuels' death on her. Yearning to draw a connection between his own political movement and the mass suicide at Jonestown committed by Jim Jones, Kai requires each of his followers to drink presumably poisoned beverages. When they do so, Kai reveals that the drinks were untainted after everyone else has finished their cup.

Ally and Ivy intend to pick up Oz at school and flee but discover that he was picked up earlier by Winter. They frantically drive to the Anderson home to find Oz unharmed. Kai claims that he was the donor whose sperm inseminated Ally when she became pregnant with Oz. Ivy insists that Oz should stay with Kai, his purported father, for the time being. Back at home, Ally prepares dinner for Ivy and confronts her for attempting to gain sole custody of Oz with the aid of Kai and his cult. Ivy scoffs at Ally's threats of retaliation and warns her that she will revert to her old skittish ways but Ally had laced the pasta and wine Ivy has been consuming with arsenic. As Ivy begins succumbing to the poison, Ally notes that murdering her is an act of retribution that will remedy her phobias. The next day, Ally arrives at a fertility clinic and manages to acquire the records of Oz's sperm donor. She then bribes the clinic worker to falsify the file. Ally invites Kai to her house for dinner and presents him doctored evidence that he is Oz's father. After disposing and preserving Ivy's body with lye, Ally and Kai embrace Oz.

== Reception ==
"Drink the Kool-Aid" was watched by 1.48 million people during its original broadcast, and gained a 0.7 ratings share among adults aged 18–49.

The episode has been critically acclaimed. On the review aggregator Rotten Tomatoes, "Drink the Kool-Aid" holds a 100% approval rating, based on 14 reviews with an average rating of 7.7 out of 10.

Tony Sokol of Den of Geek gave the episode a 4 out of 5, saying "One of the best things about "Drink the Kool-Aid" is how some of the most horrifying subtext is played out in the most mundane of settings, a boring city council meeting with gaping apes or a quaint kitchen table set for two. American Horror Story: Cult ends the episode on a terrifyingly ambiguous note, Ally's ascension in Kai's attentions. We know she can't turn a Manwich into a last meal until her son's plate is clear, but she is also quite capable of much longer-term plans. I'd vote for her."

Kat Rosenfield from Entertainment Weekly gave the episode an A−. She particularly praised the flashbacks about the other cults, calling them "a solid blast from the past". She also enjoyed the evolution of Ally's character just as much as the rest of the episode, saying that it "felt like the first in ages to actually have some trajectory." Vulture's Brian Moylan gave the episode a 3 out of 5, with a mixed review, commenting "It was my least favorite episode of the entire season so far, but at least I understood where it came from politically and thematically." However, he is still enjoying the political satire of the season, saying "This continues to be an outsized look at the madman who is behind one of the scariest turns in American politics."

Matt Fowler of IGN gave the episode a 7.2 out of 10, with a positive review. He said "Ally tried to take control and get revenge this week in "Drink the Kool-Aid," though the curse of Cult is that you watch everything through narrowed eyes, always expecting twists upon the story to be revealed in the next episode. Can Kai ever be taken at face value or will we always have to wait for a one of those "Here's what's really going on" episodes? Also, how is Kai able to convince people to follow him by telling them about actual real-life crazy people tricking vulnerable people?"

== See also ==
- Drinking the Kool-Aid
