= Winter of Our Discontent (American Horror Story) =

- American Horror Story episode
- Episode no.: Season 7 Episode 8
- Directed by: Barbara Brown
- Written by: Joshua Green
- Production code: 7ATS08
- Original air date: October 24, 2017
- Running time: 44 minutes

Guest appearances
- Adina Porter as Beverly Hope; Colton Haynes as Det. Jack Samuels; Rick Springfield as Pastor Charles; Chaz Bono as Gary Longstreet; Cameron Cowperthwaite as Speedwagon; Summera Howell as Tortured Woman

Episode chronology
← Previous "Valerie Solanas Died for Your Sins: Scumbag"	Next → "Drink the Kool-Aid"
- American Horror Story: Cult

"Winter of Our Discontent" is the eighth episode of the seventh season of the anthology television series American Horror Story. It aired on October 24, 2017, on the cable network FX. The episode was written by Joshua Green, and directed by Barbara Brown.

== Plot ==
Reduced to subservient roles for the new men in Kai's cult, Beverly and Ivy plan to rebel, but Winter defends her brother. Beverly urges Winter that Kai considers her expendable. Winter recounts a story where she and Kai infiltrated an ultra-conservative religious order led by a deranged Pastor who inflicted hideous tortures upon sinners. After that, Winter recounts, Kai went darker and became more intent on righting wrongs.

Winter visits Kai in the inner sanctum. He says that she is to bear the new Messiah through Samuels. As Samuels inseminates Winter, Kai intends to inseminate him, leaving her "pure". When the time comes for the "ritual," Winter and Samuels object and Kai insists that "no one is above the law".

Vincent shows Ally a family photograph and explains that Kai is his brother and Winter (Ivy's new lover) his sister. He says he will ensure that Ally is reunited with Oz. Ally invites Kai in for dinner, where she tells him that Vincent intends to commit Kai, and details his upcoming betrayal.

Samuels tells Winter how he met Kai and blackmailed Kai into being his partner. Samuels insists that he is not gay and tries to rape her. She takes his gun and shoots him through the head.

In the inner sanctum, a clown-masked Kai bids "bring the betrayers" to him as the cultists chant "my ruler". A hooded Beverly and Vincent are led in. Winter unmasks herself and looks on in horror as Kai slashes Vincent's throat and orders Beverly to be taken to the isolation chamber. Ally unmasks herself as the newest clown.

== Reception ==
"Winter of Our Discontent" was watched by 2.06 million people during its original broadcast, and gained a 1.0 ratings share among adults aged 18–49.

The episode received mostly positive reviews from critics. On the review aggregator Rotten Tomatoes, "Winter of Our Discontent" holds a 77% approval rating, based on 13 reviews with an average rating of 7.88 out of 10.

Tony Sokol of Den of Geek gave the episode a 4 out of 5, saying "With "Winter of Our Discontent", American Horror Story: Cult goes really dark. The series ventures into a contemporary dystopia, just like the one we're living, only with more sad clowns. Ultimately everyone is a betrayer, and everyone gets stabbed in the back, unless they are knifed in the throat. The show doesn't end on a completely down note, though. In the series' traditional last-minute twist, we learn Ally is going to get her son back after all."

Kat Rosenfield from Entertainment Weekly gave the episode a A−, and particularly enjoyed the last scene with its reveals. She is also pleased that the episode doesn't see the threesome scene through to its "repulsive conclusion". However, she criticized the use of the Judgement House, calling it "a blatant ripoff of Se7en". Vulture's Brian Moylan gave the episode a 4 out of 5, with a positive review, saying "There is a lot of great, cutting Trump satire in this episode. While late-night hosts and facile sitcoms like Will & Grace go for the easy Cheeto-faced joke, AHS cuts a lot deeper." He also enjoyed the questions about Samuels' sexuality, saying "You might think that is some crazy rationalization for some man-on-man action, but it’s not all that unique. Kai’s speech sounds exactly like Jack Donovan, a real-life homosexual alt-right figure who has a male partner of 20 years but doesn’t identify as gay."

Matt Fowler of IGN gave the episode a 6.8 out of 10, and said "Cult offered up a cool new take on Ally this week, but the rest of it buckled under the burden of this season's trend of never showing us the truth right away. Not ever knowing if what you're seeing is real is quick way to push one out of the story and into viewer-defense mode where nothing good can come. At some point soon, an episode needs to take us through everything straight arrow-style - but would we even trust it then?"
