= Chapter 10 (American Horror Story) =

- American Horror Story episode
- Episode no.: Season 6 Episode 10
- Directed by: Bradley Buecker
- Written by: Ryan Murphy; Brad Falchuk
- Production code: 6ATS10
- Original air date: November 16, 2016
- Running time: 41 minutes

Guest appearances
- Adina Porter as Lee Harris; Leslie Jordan as Ashley Gilbert; Brian Howe as Mark Phillips; Danielle Macdonald as Bristol Windows; Julie Claire as Stephanie Holder; Emma Bell as Tracy Logan; Simone Baker as Flora Harris; Jamie Martz as Bodycam Officer; James Morosini as Bob Kinneman; Joe Spellman as Dave Elder

Episode chronology
← Previous "Chapter 9"	Next → "Election Night"
- American Horror Story: Roanoke

"Chapter 10" is the tenth and final episode of the sixth season of the anthology television series American Horror Story. It aired on November 16, 2016, on the cable network FX. The episode was written by Ryan Murphy and Brad Falchuk, and directed by Bradley Buecker.

== Plot ==
My Roanoke Nightmare is screened at PaleyFest on March 15th, 2016—approximately one and a half years after the events of the series took place— where the cast and crew are interviewed by Trixie Mattel and Edward Hansen. Lee has become a celebrity, fielding questions from fans and haters alike. Meanwhile, the real Lot Polk films himself promising vengeance on Lee for taking his two children away from him and killing his family members.

In the television crime series called Crack'd, Lee goes on trial for the murders, but her attorney successfully uses the horror and psychological trauma that Lee faced at the hands of the Polks as a defense strategy. During the trial, Lee's daughter, Flora, testifies against her mother, who witnessed Lee murder her father, Mason, in the woods. Not satisfied, the district attorney then unsuccessfully prosecutes her for Mason's murder. After the trial, Lee tries to talk to Flora, but she is rebuffed.

On a topical talk show, The Lana Winters Special, famed reporter Lana Winters details Lee's life following her acquittal: Lee writes a best-selling book about her harrowing ordeal, and Lana comes out of retirement to interview her. During the interview, Lana reveals that Flora went missing earlier that day and accuses Lee of having taken her. As Lee begins to panic, Lot Polk breaks into the room and threatens them, knocking Lana out with the butt of his rifle as she attempts to talk him into giving up the gun. Just as he is about to shoot Lee, he is shot to death by the police.

In another TV series, called Spirit Chasers, a group of paranormal investigators trespasses into the Roanoke house during the blood moon, hoping to capture the reported ghosts of the house on film. Come nightfall, the participants begin to experience unnerving paranormal events. They are interrupted by Lee, searching for her daughter, who has now been missing for two weeks. The Spirit Chasers offer to help, but she advises them to flee the house while they can. The chasers ignore Lee's advice and try to follow her, but are attacked by various spirits within the house. The rest of the spirit chasers attempt to flee off the property to the police cars waiting outside, only to be killed by Thomasin and her mob.

The next day, a news report details Lee's 14-hour stand-off with police at the Roanoke house. It is believed Lee kidnapped Flora and is holding her hostage. Lana, who had survived the show's incident, finally sympathizes with Lee, admitting she understands her single-mindedness in rescuing her daughter.

Inside the house, Flora and Lee are reunited. Lee apologizes to her daughter for her mistakes, who despondently explains that everything was always for Flora's benefit. Lee wants Flora to come home, but Flora wants to sacrifice herself by burning the house down and staying as a ghost for all eternity so that she can protect Priscilla from Thomasin. Lee offers to take Flora's place, allowing Flora to leave and live her life, and Flora only agrees to this after she confers with Priscilla about it. Lee and Flora burn the house down and Flora leaves the house. She is discovered by a police officer and brought to a police car. Inside the police car, Flora witnesses the house burn and sees her mother walk off into the woods with Priscilla before she is taken away in the car. From a hilltop, Thomasin watches over her mob as they begin to surround the house once again.

== Reception ==
"Chapter 10" was watched by 2.45 million people during its original broadcast, and gained a 1.3 ratings share among adults aged 18–49.

The episode received mixed reviews from critics. On the review aggregator Rotten Tomatoes, "Chapter 10" holds a 59% approval rating, based on 17 reviews. The critical consensus reads, "Though the final impact is slight and the episode feels unnecessary, "Chapter 10" ends Roanoke on an entertainingly unique note."
