= Don't Be Afraid of the Dark =

Don't Be Afraid of the Dark may refer to:

- Don't Be Afraid of the Dark (album), an album by Robert Cray (1988)
- Don't Be Afraid of the Dark (1973 film), a television horror film
- Don't Be Afraid of the Dark (2010 film), a remake of the 1973 film
- "Don't Be Afraid of the Dark" (American Horror Story), an episode of the anthology television series American Horror Story (2017)
