= Don't Be Afraid of the Dark (American Horror Story) =

- American Horror Story episode
- Episode no.: Season 7 Episode 2
- Directed by: Liza Johnson
- Written by: Tim Minear
- Production code: 7ATS02
- Original air date: September 12, 2017
- Running time: 47 minutes

Guest appearances
- Billy Eichner as Harrison Wilton; Adina Porter as Beverly Hope; Colton Haynes as Det. Jack Samuels; John Carroll Lynch as Twisty the Clown; Leslie Grossman as Meadow Wilton; Cooper Dodson as Oz Mayfair-Richards; Jorge-Luis Pallo as Pedro Morales; Zack Ward as Roger

Episode chronology
← Previous "Election Night"	Next → "Neighbors from Hell"
- American Horror Story: Cult

"Don't Be Afraid of the Dark" is the second episode of the seventh season of the anthology television series American Horror Story. It aired on September 12, 2017, on the cable network FX. The episode was written by Tim Minear, and directed by Liza Johnson.

== Plot ==
Ally sees a clown in the bed with her and runs downstairs. Ivy inspects the bedroom and finds nothing.

Beverly Hope reports on Kai's assault which was caught on camera. Kai announces his campaign for a seat on the city council. The Wiltons move into the Chang's former home. They invite Oz over to see Harrison's colony of bees. Harrison discloses to Ally and Ivy that he is gay.

Roger, the sous-chef at the Butchery on Main, bickers with a Hispanic employee named Pedro. Later that night, after the Butchery's security alarm trips, Ally discovers Roger hanging on a hook in the meat locker. Detective Samuels singles out Pedro as the most likely suspect. Afterwards, Kai canvasses at Ally's doorstep. Kai unnervingly belittles her political positions.

That night, Winter offers Oz advice on overcoming nightmares and draws a bath for Ally. Winter attempts to seduce Ally but is interrupted by the power going out. Harrison alleges that there is a multi-state power outage. Winter flees and abandons Ally by herself with Oz. Ivy, after a frantic phone call with Ally is cut short by Ally's phone dying, sends Pedro to the house with a charger and some other supplies. Ally is terrorized by multiple clowns before grabbing Oz and planning to vacate. Upon opening the backdoor, Ally instinctively shoots Pedro with the gun, which had been lent to her by the Wiltons.

== Reception ==
"Don't Be Afraid of the Dark" was watched by 2.38 million people during its original broadcast, and gained a 1.2 ratings share among adults and teens, aged 18–49.

The episode received positive reviews from critics. On the review aggregator Rotten Tomatoes, "Don't Be Afraid of the Dark" holds an 88% approval rating, based on 16 reviews with an average rating of 6.89 out of 10.

Tony Sokol of Den of Geek gave the episode a 3.5 out of 5, saying "[this episode] continues to shade the atmosphere of American Horror Story: Cult with false leads and red herrings. Everyone will be part of the hive by the end. We are all pods." He also praised Lourd's performance, calling her "positively hypnotic, magnetic as a new age guru", but criticized the acting of Pill.

Kat Rosenfield from Entertainment Weekly gave the episode a B, and praised in particular the introduction of the Wiltons. Vulture's Brian Moylan gave the episode a 4 out of 5, saying "Subtle, intimate, and insightful aren't adjectives I’m used to using when talking about AHS, but I really like it. Let’s hope it stays that way."

Matt Fowler of IGN gave the episode a 6.8 out of 10, with a mixed to positive review. He said "the madhouse manipulation of Ally started becoming a bit too obvious, and unbelievable, this week as it felt like she was being easily steered in whatever direction the show needed her to go for the sake of plot. There's some good acting, and decent jolts here and there, but right now the complex plot to gaslight her feels like an exhausting endeavor for seemingly minimal rewards."
