= Charles (Manson) in Charge =

- American Horror Story episode
- Episode no.: Season 7 Episode 10
- Directed by: Bradley Buecker
- Written by: Ryan Murphy & Brad Falchuk
- Production code: 7ATS10
- Original air date: November 7, 2017
- Running time: 50 minutes

Guest appearances
- Billy Eichner as Charles "Tex" Watson; Frances Conroy as Bebe Babbitt; Adina Porter as Beverly Hope; Leslie Grossman as Patricia Krenwinkel; Chaz Bono as Gary Longstreet; Dennis Cockrum as Herbert Jackson; Cameron Cowperthwaite as Speedwagon; Rachel Roberts as Sharon Tate; Sarah Yarkin as Riley

Episode chronology
← Previous "Drink the Kool-Aid"	Next → "Great Again"
- American Horror Story: Cult

"Charles (Manson) in Charge" is the tenth episode of American Horror Story: Cult, the seventh season of the anthology television series American Horror Story. It aired on November 7, 2017, on the cable network FX. The episode was written by Ryan Murphy & Brad Falchuk, and directed by Bradley Buecker.

== Plot ==
Kai resolves to orchestrate a "night of a thousand Tates", referring to the infamous Tate murders. Gary and a few of Kai's followers break into a local Planned Parenthood office. Once inside, Gary is surrounded by Kai and his followers wearing their clown attire and he is stabbed to death. During an interview, Kai suggests that the incumbent senator is responsible for Gary's murder.

Kai begins to suspect that there is a mole in the cult. He begins having hallucinations where he receives advice from Dr. Vincent and Charles Manson. Ally tells Kai that she has found a listening device. The doorbell rings and Kai instructs Ally to stay where she is. Kai answers the door and finds Bebe standing there. They both go to the basement where Bebe tells Kai that he isn't keeping his end of the deal they made a year ago. Bebe pulls a gun on Kai and Ally shoots her in the back of the head.

That evening, Winter shaves Kai's head in the bathroom. Kai tells Winter that he feels as though she's slipping away and she tells Kai that every follower of his will leave him one day except for her. Kai tells Winter that he is planning on having her by his side when he is in the White House and they briefly hug each other. Kai then suggests that Winter run away to Montana and pulls out the train ticket she gave to Beverly earlier.

In the basement, Kai, convinced that Winter is the mole, demands her to confess. When she denies that she is the mole and refuses to confess, Kai tearfully strangles her to death. Speedwagon runs to his car afterward and destroys a wire. Ally enters his car and greets him.

== Reception ==
"Charles (Manson) in Charge" was watched by 1.82 million people during its original broadcast, and gained a 0.8 ratings share among adults aged 18–49.

The episode received mostly positive reviews from critics. On the review aggregator Rotten Tomatoes, "Charles (Manson) in Charge" holds an 80% approval rating, based on 15 reviews with an average rating of 7.08 out of 10.

Tony Sokol of Den of Geek gave the episode a 3.5 out of 5, saying "While Kai's subversion and Ally's apparent conversion are unexpected, American Horror Story: Cult doesn't quite pull the rug out from under us this week. The recreation of the murders is expertly done, fulfilling the anticipation of the promised gore, but the American horror at the center of the episode is more sad than frightening. If nothing else, this episode convinced me that Butte, Montana, is the scariest place on earth."

Kat Rosenfield from Entertainment Weekly gave the episode an A−. She particularly praised the scenes with Charles Manson, calling them "horrifying even by AHS standards". She also enjoyed Billie Lourd's performance in this episode. However, she noticed that some plot points, like Gary's death, could only be explained by Kai's madness, "because it otherwise makes absolutely no sense".

Matt Fowler of IGN gave the episode a 6 out of 10, with a mixed review. He said "A week out from the finale, Cult revealed that Kai was never the person we'd come to know, even in flashbacks. Instead, he was a bitter woman hater who was most definitely not pretending to be a woman hater for the sake of a twist that could have flipped the show on its ear. With increasing paranoia and drug use, Kai went from a man leading an ambitious and lethal social experiment to... just another unremarkable trolling bigot."
