= Chapter 9 (American Horror Story) =

- American Horror Story episode
- Episode no.: Season 6 Episode 9
- Directed by: Alexis O. Korycinski
- Written by: Tim Minear
- Production code: 6ATS09
- Original air date: November 9, 2016
- Running time: 37 minutes

Guest appearances
- Adina Porter as Lee Harris; Taissa Farmiga as Sophie Green; Jon Bass as Milo Briggs; Jacob Artist as Todd Connors; Shannon Lucio as Diana Cross; Jamie Martz as Bodycam Officer; Michael Whaley as Investigating Detective

Episode chronology
← Previous "Chapter 8"	Next → "Chapter 10"
- American Horror Story: Roanoke

"Chapter 9" is the ninth episode of the sixth season of the anthology television series American Horror Story. It aired on November 9, 2016, on the cable network FX. The episode was written by Tim Minear and directed by Alexis O. Korycinski.

== Plot ==
Lee and Audrey convince Dylan that the macabre series of hauntings in the set is real and that they must retrieve the video and rescue Monet. After arriving at the Polk compound, Lee separates from the group to erase her video confession from one of the videotapes as Dylan finds the Polks' pickup truck, while Audrey finds Monet and the tapes. The women are confronted by Ishmael Polk and Audrey shoots him in the head with Lee's revolver. Lot Polk escapes with the truck as Audrey and Monet escape into the woods, leaving Dylan behind. The actresses return to the house, and they're finally shocked when they watch the video of Lee confessing to Mason's murder out of resentment at his primary custody of her daughter, Flora. In the woods, Lee sees Scathach killing a wild boar and is given the wild boar's heart by her. Lee accepts the heart and sells her soul to Scathach, and then she becomes a member of the Roanoke Colony.

Meanwhile, three teenage My Roanoke Nightmare fans—Sophie, Milo, and Todd—return to the woods to expose the Roanoke hauntings to the police. They run into Lee, who has fallen under Scathach's trance and murdered Todd. The possessed Lee arrives at the house to attack the other survivors, killing Monet with a broken wooden shaft of a fallen chandelier. Audrey fights Lee and runs out of the house, but the latter injures the actress and traps her in the storm cellar. The ghostly colony arrives outside the house and disembowels Dylan, while Sophie and Milo are captured when they attempt to escape as the ghosts impale the two at the stake and burn them alive.

The next morning, the police arrive at the Roanoke house and bear witness to all the carnage, both inside and outside of the house. While searching for bodies outside, they come across an unconscious Lee. When they revive her, she appears to have no memory of the events that had transpired the night before and is completely catatonic. The officers bring Lee over to a squad car and sit her down inside it. Audrey manages to crawl up from the storm cellar and gets the attention of the police officers, who rush to help her. When Lee sees Audrey, she goes running over to her. Audrey, not knowing that Lee was possessed, pulls her gun, attempting to shoot Lee out of vengeance. Multiple police officers shoot her dead before she can complete the act, thus making Lee Harris the sole survivor of the blood moon.

== Reception ==
"Chapter 9" was watched by 2.43 million people in its original American broadcast, and gained a 1.3 ratings share among adults aged 18–49.

The episode received generally positive reviews. On the review aggregator website Rotten Tomatoes, the episode holds a 92% approval rating, based on 12 reviews with an average score of 6.2/10. The critical consensus reads, ""Chapter 9" gruesomely dismisses more characters while presenting the welcome return of another American Horror Story veteran and preparing viewers for a twisty finale." Emily L. Stephens of The A.V. Club wrote, ""Chapter 9" is a solid episode of American Horror Story's most meaningful and consistent season – and by 'solid,' I mean strongly told, startling, and filled with slithering entrails and smoking corpses." In contrast, IGN's Matt Fowler stated, "The penultimate episode of American Horror Story: Roanoke was a bumpy, blurry mess of found footage and flat fiendishness."
