= Great Again (American Horror Story) =

- American Horror Story episode
- Episode no.: Season 7 Episode 11
- Directed by: Jennifer Lynch
- Written by: Tim Minear
- Production code: 7ATS11
- Original air date: November 14, 2017
- Running time: 45 minutes

Guest appearances
- Adina Porter as Beverly Hope; Annie Ilonzeh as Erika; Dennis Cockrum as Herbert Jackson; Cameron Cowperthwaite as Speedwagon; Cooper Dodson as Oz Mayfair-Richards; Liz Jenkins as Gloria Whitmore

Episode chronology
← Previous "Charles (Manson) in Charge"	Next → "The End"
- American Horror Story: Cult

"Great Again" is the eleventh and final episode of the seventh season of the anthology television series American Horror Story. It aired on November 14, 2017, on the cable network FX. The episode was written by Tim Minear, and directed by Jennifer Lynch.

== Plot ==
Kai assembles a meeting to informs his devotees that the "night of a thousand Sharon Tates" has been downgraded to one hundred. Meanwhile, Ally murders Speedwagon after finding out that he is an informant for the state police. She then tips off the FBI, which sends a SWAT team to storm the Anderson basement. Kai goes to prison while Beverly convinces the FBI that she was an unwilling participant in the cult and is released.

Eleven months later, Ally has become a celebrity and is running for the Senate seat. She divulges to Beverly that the FBI recruited her as an informant while she was institutionalized. Beverly then becomes a key advisor to Ally's Senate campaign. At Oz's birthday party, Ally receives a phone call from Kai, who swears vengeance against her.

After rebuilding his cult behind bars with both inmates and a security guard, Kai escapes from a maximum security prison and infiltrates a televised political debate between Ally and her opponent. Armed with a gun provided by Gloria, he proceeds to take credit for Ally's success and rant that women should learn their place. Kai points the gun at Ally's head and pulls the trigger, but discovers that the gun is not loaded and Gloria's true allegiance to Ally is exposed before Beverly shoots him in the head, killing him.

Preliminary results for the election show that Ally obtains the vast majority of the female vote and wins a Senate seat. Later, Ally puts Oz to bed. She then dons a SCUM cloak before departing into the night to attend a meeting of "empowered women who want to change the system".

== Reception ==
"Great Again" was watched by 1.97 million people during its original broadcast, and gained a 1.0 ratings share among adults aged 18–49.

The episode received mostly positive reviews from critics. On the review aggregator Rotten Tomatoes, "Great Again" holds a 67% approval rating, based on 18 reviews with an average rating of 7.36 out of 10.

Tony Sokol of Den of Geek gave the episode a 4 out of 5, saying "[the episode] is as subtly effective as the season has been peripherally horrific. Real life settings, secret organizations, crypto-SuperPACs and brown shirted thugs pick at the scabs of deep-seated conspiratorial paranoia. Politicians are every bit as scary as sad clowns and serial killers, and they have the power to affect more lives. That's pretty frightening, and fear is trust. But the season ends on a reassuring note for horror fans as we see Ally fitting herself in the cloak of the cult she now leads."

Kat Rosenfield from Entertainment Weekly gave the episode an A. She particularly enjoyed the last confrontation between Ally and Kai, saying it was what "we need and deserve". She also praised Kai's death scene, commenting that it was about "as satisfying an act of vengeance as we’ve gotten on this series, ever." Finally, even if she mentioned that the end would have been fine without it, she appreciated the final twist of the episode. Vulture's Brian Moylan gave the episode a 4 out of 5, with a positive review, commenting "This rather strong season was different, and so it necessitated a different kind of ending. It’s less of a frightfest than it is a fantasy." Despite thinking that the shape of the episode was "strangely convoluted", he particularly enjoyed Paulson's performance and so the character of Ally, her development and her dynamic with Adina Porter's Beverly.

Matt Fowler of IGN gave the episode a 5.8 out of 10, with a mixed to negative review. He said "Cult continued with Kai's boring endgame misogyny, that only really started for real last week, and turned everything into a screaming showdown between him and Ally as they verbally volleyed tired memes and platitudes, undercutting some of the more interesting ideas that the season began with. Revenge is always sweet, but Kai had to go nuts and lose a lot of his edge, becoming quite boring in the process, in order to lose all he'd built up."
