= American Horror Story: Cult =

Seventh season of American Horror Story

- Season 7
- Promotional poster and home media cover art
- Showrunner: Ryan Murphy
- Starring: Sarah Paulson; Evan Peters; Cheyenne Jackson; Billie Lourd; Alison Pill
- No. of episodes: 11

Release
- Original network: FX
- Original release: September 5 – November 14, 2017

Season chronology
- ← Previous; Roanoke Next → Apocalypse

The seventh season of the American horror anthology television series American Horror Story, subtitled Cult, takes place in the fictional suburb of Brookfield Heights, Michigan, during the year 2017, and centers on a cult terrorizing the residents in the aftermath of Donald Trump winning the 2016 U.S. presidential election. It is the first season to not feature any supernatural elements. The smallest ensemble cast of the series, it includes Sarah Paulson, Evan Peters, Cheyenne Jackson, Billie Lourd, and Alison Pill, with all returning from previous seasons, except newcomers Lourd and Pill. This season marks the first to not feature cast mainstay Lily Rabe. The season is connected with Freak Show and Asylum.

Created by Ryan Murphy and Brad Falchuk for the cable network FX, the series is produced by 20th Century Fox Television. Cult was broadcast between September 5 to November 14, 2017, consisting of 11 episodes. Paulson, Peters, and Adina Porter received Saturn Awards nominations for their performances. Additionally, Paulson and Porter were nominated for Outstanding Lead Actress and Outstanding Supporting Actress in a Limited Series or Movie respectively at the 70th Primetime Emmy Awards, while Peters received a nomination for Best Actor in a Movie or Limited Series at the 8th Critics' Choice TV Awards.

== Cast and characters ==
Cult main cast

Sarah Paulson

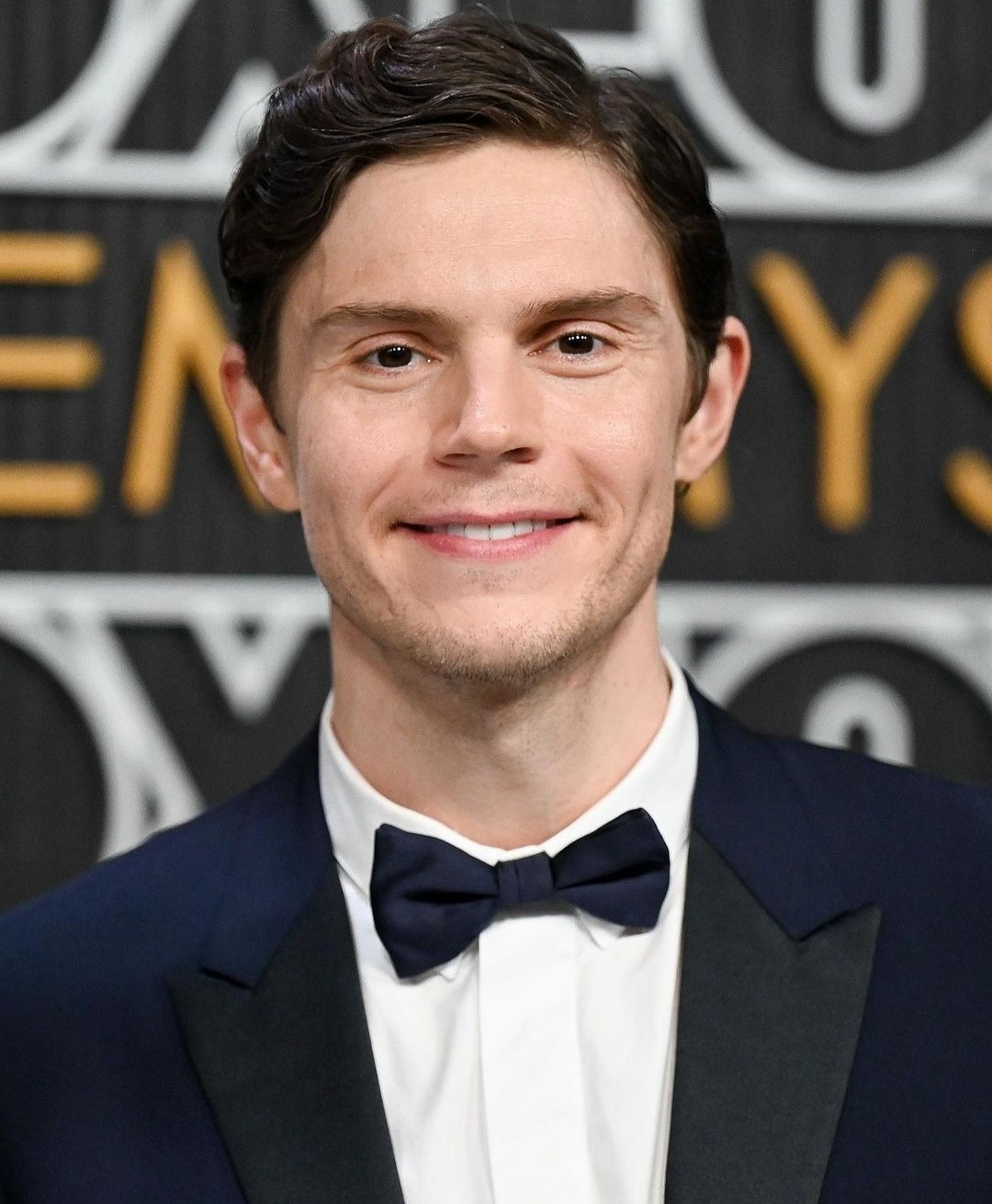
Evan Peters

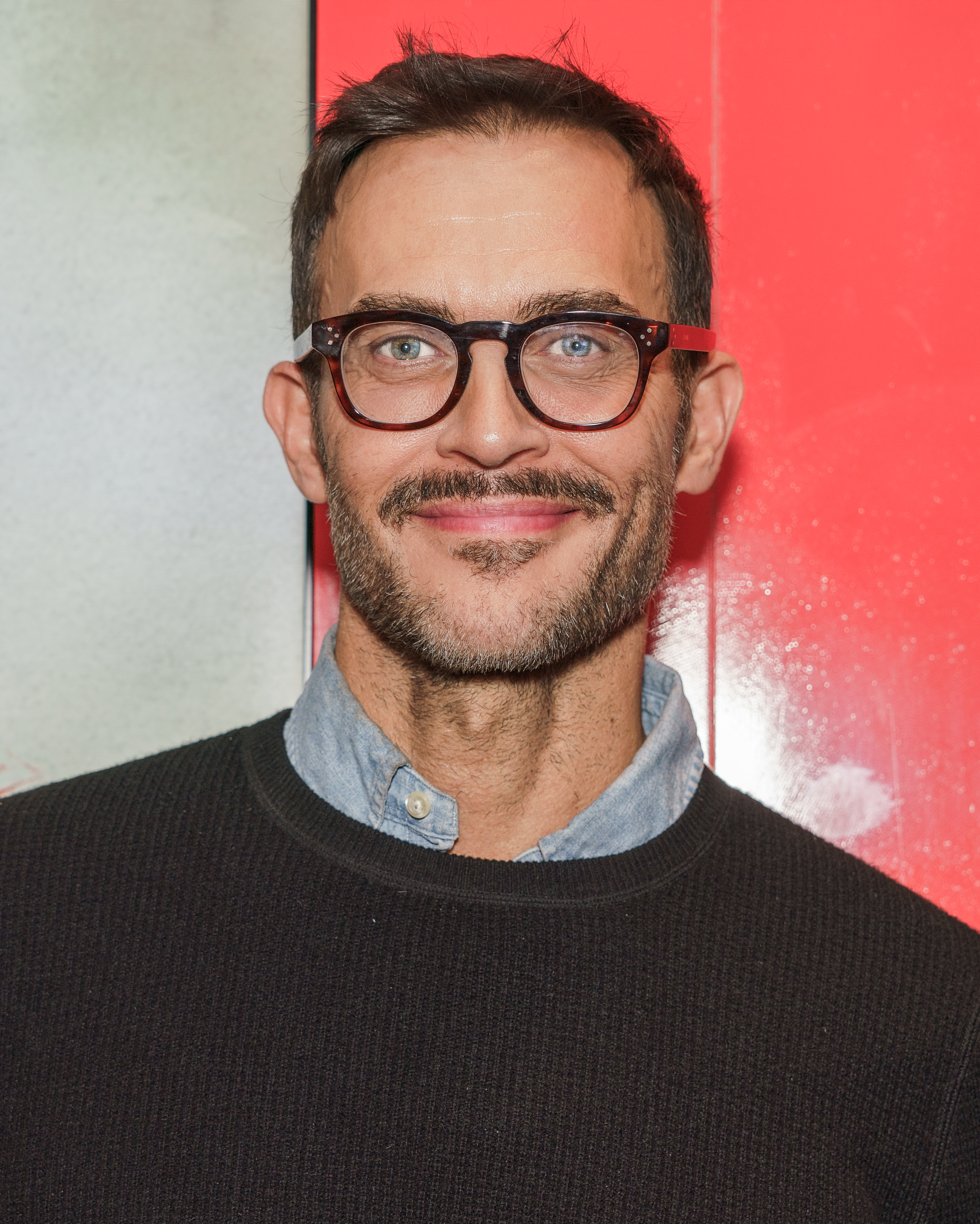
Cheyenne Jackson

Billie Lourd

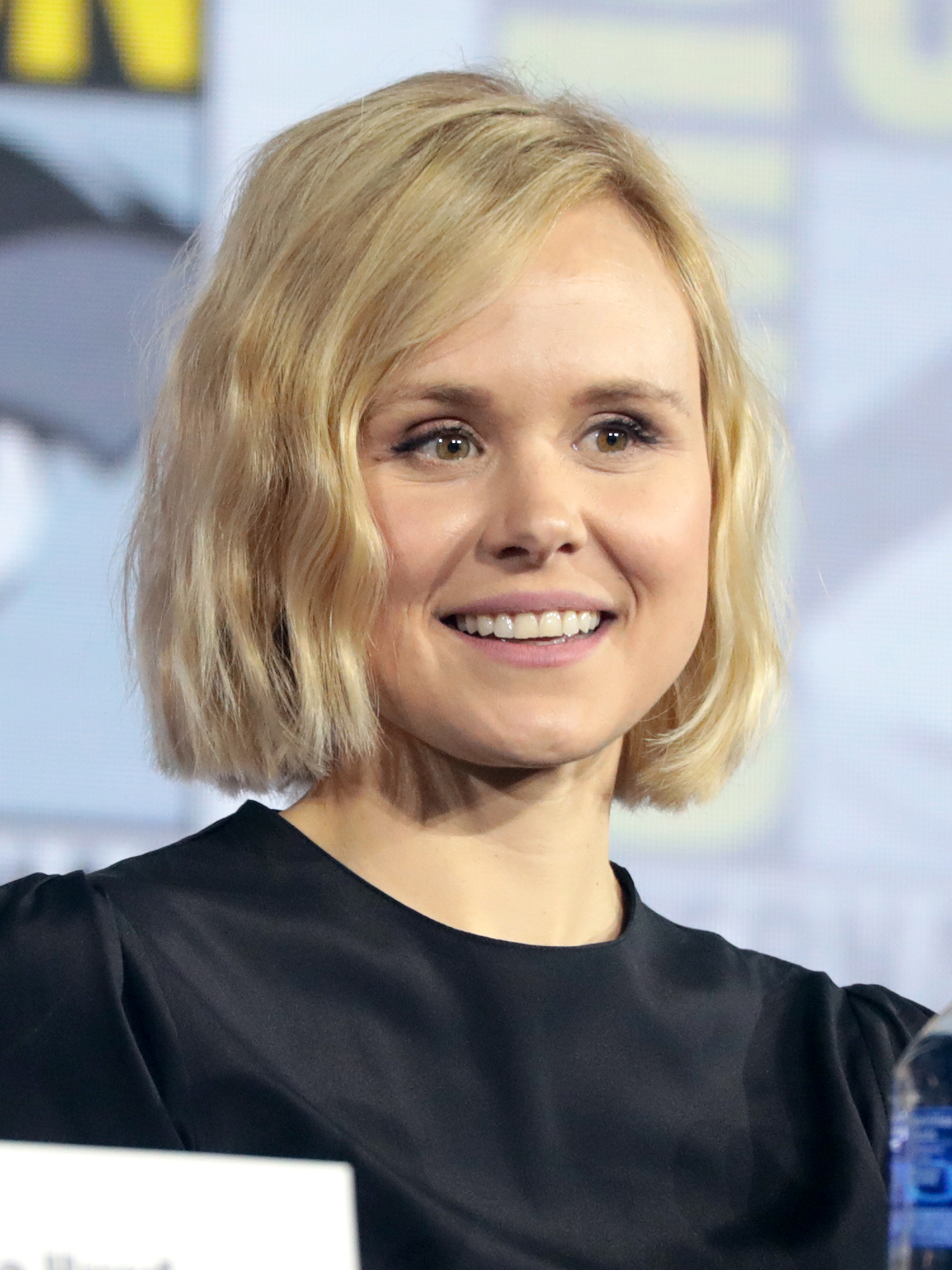
Alison Pill

=== Main ===
- Sarah Paulson as
  - Ally Mayfair-Richards
  - Susan Atkins
- Evan Peters as
  - Kai Anderson
  - Andy Warhol
  - Marshall Applewhite
  - David Koresh
  - Jim Jones
  - Jesus
  - Charles Manson
- Cheyenne Jackson as Dr. Rudy Vincent
- Billie Lourd as
  - Winter Anderson
  - Linda Kasabian
- Alison Pill as Ivy Mayfair-Richards

=== Special guest stars ===
- Billy Eichner as
  - Harrison Wilton
  - Charles "Tex" Watson
- Mare Winningham as Sally Keffler
- Emma Roberts as Serena Belinda
- Lena Dunham as Valerie Solanas
- Frances Conroy as Bebe Babbitt

=== Recurring ===
- John Carroll Lynch as Twisty the Clown
- Colton Haynes as Detective Jack Samuels
- Cooper Dodson as Ozymandias "Oz" Mayfair-Richards
- Jorge-Luis Pallo as Pedro Morales
- Zack Ward as Roger
- Adina Porter as Beverly Hope
- Leslie Grossman as
  - Meadow Wilton
  - Patricia Krenwinkel
- Chaz Bono as Gary K. Longstreet
- James Morosini as R.J.
- Laura Allen as Rosie
- Dermot Mulroney as Bob Thompson
- Cameron Cowperthwaite as Speedwagon

=== Guest stars ===
- Tim Kang as Tom Chang
- Dot-Marie Jones as Butchy May
- Jamie Brewer as Hedda
- Rick Springfield as Pastor Charles
- Rachel Roberts as Sharon Tate

== Episodes ==
No. overall	No. in season	Title	Directed by	Written by	Original release date	Prod. code	US viewers (millions)
74	1	"Election Night"	Bradley Buecker	Ryan Murphy & Brad Falchuk	September 5, 2017	7ATS01	3.93
Ally and Ivy are a married couple who have a son named Oz. Ally has several phobias (primarily coulrophobia, which causes Ally to have a panic attack after seeing Oz's Twisty the Clown comic). The fears intensify after learning that Donald Trump has won the 2016 U.S. presidential election. Her psychiatrist, Dr. Rudy Vincent, recommends a medicine to calm her phobia-induced anxiety. Clowns soon start to stalk Ally. Siblings Kai and Winter make a mysterious pact after Trump becomes president. Kai gives a speech opposing extra security at a local Jewish center, arguing that people should learn to live with their fear. His views are rejected by Councilman Tom Chang, a neighbor of Ally & Ivy. Winter becomes Oz's nanny and attempts to desensitize him to violence. Kai entices a group of Hispanic men to beat him up. Oz and Winter witness Tom and his wife being slaughtered in their home by a group of clowns. The police erroneously rule the incident a murder–suicide.
75	2	"Don't Be Afraid of the Dark"	Liza Johnson	Tim Minear	September 12, 2017	7ATS02	2.38
Oz tells the police and his mothers about the clowns, but Winter says that he imagined them. Mr. Chang's death leaves a city council seat vacant. Riding a wave of sympathy in the wake of his beating by the Hispanic immigrants, Kai campaigns for the vacant seat. Ally distrusts the eccentric new occupants of the Chang's former home, Harrison and Meadow Wilton. At Ally and Ivy's restaurant, the Butchery on Main, tensions rise following a heated argument between the sous-chef, Roger, and a Hispanic employee, Pedro. Later, the restaurant's security system goes off and Ally investigates. She finds Roger hanging on a hook in the meat locker. Police detective Samuels singles out Pedro as the most likely suspect. Ally obtains a gun from the Wiltons. A distraught Ally is comforted and briefly seduced by Winter. During an alleged power outage in the city, Ally is terrorized by the same clowns. Ivy sends Pedro to deliver supplies to the house and he is accidentally shot and killed by Ally. Oz witnesses the shooting and is further traumatized.
76	3	"Neighbors from Hell"	Gwyneth Horder-Payton	James Wong	September 19, 2017	7ATS03	2.25
After a therapy session with Dr. Vincent in which a couple talks about the wife overcoming her taphephobia, clowns break into the couple's home and entomb them in coffins. Picketers protest Pedro's death outside of the Butchery on Main. Kai promises Ally that he will dissuade them. The Wiltons berate Ally for Pedro's death and give Oz a pet guinea pig. A truck dispersing a mysterious green gas throughout the neighborhood disturbs Ally. Oz's guinea pig is microwaved and killed. Ally suspects the Wiltons to be the perpetrators. She assaults Harrison and threatens Meadow. Oz discovers online footage of Ally being seduced by Winter, devastating Ivy. The Wiltons are individually interrogated by Kai. Harrison expresses his desire for Meadow's death. Afterwards, Meadow disappears, and Harrison blames Ally.
77	4	"11/9"	Gwyneth Horder-Payton	John J. Gray	September 26, 2017	7ATS04	2.13
On election night, several main characters are shown voting. Despite promising not to cast a "protest vote" Ally votes for Jill Stein, enraging Ivy. The day after the election, Harrison becomes Kai's personal trainer. Kai takes Harrison under his wing and eventually convinces him to murder his boss, who degrades others. Later, Kai takes a special interest in a news reporter named Beverly Hope. Beverly has been repeatedly passed over for promotion and is being overshadowed by a younger reporter named Serena, who is having an affair with Beverly's boss, Bob. Kai has his followers murder Serena in order to convince Beverly of his abilities and offers her "equal power" in his quest for domination. Ivy attends a political rally where she is groped by a man named Gary. Winter comes to Ivy's defense and the two have lunch together. That night, Ivy and Winter kidnap Gary and chain him to a pole in an abandoned building to prevent him from voting the next day. Kai comes to Gary's aid one hour before the polls close and offers him a saw. Gary severs his chained hand and votes for Trump with Kai's help.
78	5	"Holes"	Maggie Kiley	Crystal Liu	October 3, 2017	7ATS05	2.20
Beverly informs Kai that Bob is compromising news coverage of the clown murders and thereby hindering Kai's campaign. Kai, Beverly, Winter, Harrison, Detective Samuels, Ivy, Gary, and Beverly's cameraman, RJ, don clown masks, break into Bob's house, and film his murder (they also murder a "gimp" Bob has suspended from hooks in his attic). Ivy and RJ are deeply disturbed by the murders. Beverly later advises Kai to cut ties with RJ, whom she views as a weak link. Each cult member, beginning with Ivy, shoots a tied-up RJ in the head with a nail gun before Kai finishes him off. Meadow pleads to Ally for safety from the cult and lets slip that Ivy is a member. Ally later sees Meadow lying in an open grave in her backyard. Beverly probes Kai about the whereabouts of his parents and Kai divulges that his mom shot his abusive father and then herself in a murder–suicide. Dr. Rudy Vincent, revealed to be Kai and Winter's older brother, insisted that they cover up the deaths in order to protect his career and continue receiving their mom's pension and dad's disability checks.
79	6	"Mid-Western Assassin"	Bradley Buecker	Todd Kubrak	October 10, 2017	7ATS06	2.15
Meadow reveals to Ally that she had fallen in love with Kai and decided to desert the cult when her feelings were not reciprocated. Meadow also tells Ally that the cult has made strides to drive her insane so Ivy would gain sole custody of Oz. Ally plans to use Meadow's testimony to expose Kai and pays an opposing candidate, Sally Keffler, a visit to ask for her help. In the midst of their conversation, the cult breaks into Sally's house and Kai shoots her in the chest, while Ally hides in the bathroom. He stages her murder as a suicide. The next day, at a political rally, Meadow shoots several people, including Kai. Ally attempts to wrest the gun from Meadow's hands, but Meadow shoots herself in the mouth. Ally is arrested after a SWAT team arrives and finds her with the gun in her hands. Kai had ordered Meadow to attempt to assassinate him to make him a national-level presence. Meadow was also instructed to bear witness against Ally, since no one would believe a "crazy woman".
80	7	"Valerie Solanas Died for Your Sins: Scumbag"	Rachel Goldberg	Crystal Liu	October 17, 2017	7ATS07	2.07
Ally is sent to a psychiatric hospital. Kai wins the vacant seat on city council. His presence in the national media attracts an underground following of misogynistic militiamen. Beverly, Winter, and Ivy are warned by Bebe Babbitt, the former lover of radical feminist Valerie Solanas, about the danger of putting their trust in Kai. Bebe asserts that men in power always push women aside. She divulges to them that Solanas orchestrated the murders credited to the Zodiac Killer. Solanas died haunted by the fact that her legacy would be tied to her shooting of Andy Warhol. Later, Beverly, Winter, and Ivy murder Harrison for making a sexist comment. Kai and Bebe watch Beverly report on Harrison's death together.
81	8	"Winter of Our Discontent"	Barbara Brown	Joshua Green	October 24, 2017	7ATS08	2.06
Reduced to subservient roles for the new men in Kai's cult, Beverly and Ivy plan to rebel, but Winter assures them that Kai is dependable, and recounts a time when they saved tortured captives of a deranged pastor together. Kai's proposal that Winter be impregnated with the "messiah" by Samuels does not go as planned, and Samuels later attempts to rape Winter, who shoots him in the head. Ally is released from the psychiatric hospital and, in an effort to get her son back, informs Kai that Vincent is seeking to get him committed. Kai kills Vincent and confines Beverly to an isolation chamber, blaming her for the death of Samuels. Ally joins the cult, much to the dismay of Ivy.
82	9	"Drink the Kool-Aid"	Angela Bassett	Adam Penn	October 31, 2017	7ATS09	1.48
Kai tells his followers about cult leaders Marshall Applewhite, David Koresh and Jim Jones, expressing great admiration for all of them. Despondent over the death of her brother Vincent, Winter tries to convince Ally and Ivy to flee with her, but they are intercepted. Kai declares his intention to run for Senate. Ivy and Ally again attempt to flee, but the cult kidnaps Oz and holds him at their compound. Later, Kai requires each cult member to drink poisoned Kool-Aid to test their loyalty. Afterwards, he reveals that the drinks were untainted. Meanwhile, Ally serves Ivy pasta and wine laced with arsenic, and Ivy drops to the floor and dies. Oz refutes Kai's stories about the cult leaders and is punished. As a means to protect Oz from harm, Ally shows Kai doctored evidence that he was her sperm donor and is Oz's biological father.
83	10	"Charles (Manson) in Charge"	Bradley Buecker	Ryan Murphy & Brad Falchuk	November 7, 2017	7ATS10	1.82
Kai recounts the Tate murders to the militiamen and reveals his master plan: a simultaneous coordinated mass murder of pregnant women by his followers. Later, he begins to suspect that a mole has infiltrated the cult and slips into a state of manic-induced paranoia which plagues him with visions of his dead brother and Charles Manson. Meanwhile, Bebe is incensed by Kai's failing to implement their master plan to unleash female rage with an inflammatory political platform. Ally shoots Bebe in the head after she pulls a gun on Kai. After reporting on the murder of Gary, enacted by the cult at a local Planned Parenthood, a broken Beverly is urged by Winter to run away. Beverly insists that she remain loyal to Kai. Kai tearfully strangles Winter to death after Ally singles her out as the mole. Ally takes notice of the real mole, militiaman Speedwagon.
84	11	"Great Again"	Jennifer Lynch	Tim Minear	November 14, 2017	7ATS11	1.97
Ally murders Speedwagon after finding out that he is an informant for the state police. She then tips off an FBI SWAT team, which storms the Anderson basement on the night that the cult intends to massacre one hundred pregnant women. Months later, Ally divulges to Beverly, who has been released by the FBI because they believed she was an unwilling participant in the cult, that the FBI recruited her as an informant while she was institutionalized. Beverly becomes a key advisor in Ally's Senate campaign. After rebuilding his cult behind bars with both inmates and a security guard, Kai escapes from a maximum security prison and infiltrates a televised political debate between Ally and her opponent. After a misogynistic tirade, Kai points a gun to Ally's head and pulls the trigger, but discovers that the gun is not loaded, having been tricked by the guard earlier. Beverly then shoots him in the head, killing him. Ally obtains the vast majority of the women's vote and wins a Senate seat. Later, Ally dons a cloak similar to that worn by Valerie Solanas's group and departs to attend a meeting with a group of "empowered women who want to change the system".

== Production ==
=== Development ===
On October 4, 2016, the series was renewed for a seventh cycle, which premiered on September 5, 2017. Ryan Murphy confirmed that the season will be connected to Freak Show, but will be set in modern day. In February 2017, on Watch What Happens Live, Murphy announced that the season would revolve around the 2016 U.S. election and suggested that it may feature a character based on President Donald Trump. Murphy has said that the season will be representative of both sides of the political divide. He also said that he will be "illuminating and highlighting" groups of people he believes to be "ignored by the current [Trump] administration and who are afraid and feel terrorized that their lives are going to be taken away."

It was later confirmed that the season would be set in the aftermath of the presidential election, with the first episode taking place on election night. Murphy explained it will be about "the fallout of that night, which to many people, from all sides of the camps is a horror story." He also revealed the season would not feature Donald Trump or Hillary Clinton, stating "Horror Story is always about allegory, so the election is allegory." In April 2017, Murphy confirmed that archive footage of the election night would be used in the season premiere.

Murphy revealed via Twitter that the details of the seventh season, including the title, would be revealed on July 20. He also teased that the opening sequence of the series would return in this season, following its absence in Roanoke.

On July 20, 2017, it was announced at San Diego Comic-Con that the title of the season would be Cult. Murphy also revealed it would be set in Michigan, and confirmed it would consist of a total of 11 episodes, premiering on September 5, 2017. For the first time, the series did not air on Wednesdays but rather on Tuesdays. On August 3, 2017, online posters revealed the names of multiple characters of the season. On August 21, 2017, the opening title sequence of the season was revealed, following its absence in the previous season. That same month, Murphy confirmed that, contrary to the past seasons, Cult would not feature supernatural elements.

=== Casting ===
During the Winter 2017 TCA Press Tour, series mainstays Sarah Paulson and Evan Peters were reported to be starring as the leads in the season. In March 2017, Billy on the Street host Billy Eichner was announced to be cast in the series, playing a role in the life of Paulson's character. His character is slated for appearing in "six or seven" episodes. The next month, it was reported that Scream Queens actress Billie Lourd will also star in the seventh installment of the series. In May 2017, Leslie Grossman, who starred in Murphy's series Popular, joined the cast of the series, and Angela Bassett hinted she may return in a recurring role. Despite this, Bassett didn't appear, but she did direct the episode "Drink the Kool-Aid". Later that month, it was confirmed via set pictures that Adina Porter and Cheyenne Jackson were also returning. In June 2017, Murphy confirmed via his Instagram account that Colton Haynes, whom Murphy worked with previously on second season of Scream Queens, was joining the casting for the seventh season. Later that month, set pictures revealed that Alison Pill was joining the cast of the season, seemingly portraying the partner of Sarah Paulson's character. In July 2017, Murphy revealed via his Twitter account that Lena Dunham was joining the season. She played Valerie Solanas, author of the SCUM Manifesto and attempted murderer of Andy Warhol, via flashbacks. Murphy also confirmed the returns of Frances Conroy and Mare Winningham. Conroy has appeared in all the seasons except Hotel, while Winningham has appeared in Coven, Freak Show, and Hotel. In August 2017, Murphy confirmed the return of Emma Roberts, who appeared in Coven and Freak Show, while Roanoke actors Chaz Bono and James Morosini also confirmed their returns. In the seventh episode, Murder House, Coven, and Freak Show actress Jamie Brewer returned to the show.

On June 26, 2017, it was confirmed that Lady Gaga would not return for the seventh season due to other projects. Despite rumors, Entertainment Weekly reported on July 7, 2017, that Vera Farmiga, sister of American Horror Story actress Taissa Farmiga, would not appear in the season. Later that month, it was confirmed by The Hollywood Reporter that Kathy Bates will not appear in Cult, after four seasons of regular appearances.

Murphy also revealed via his Instagram account that Freak Show character Twisty the Clown would return in the seventh season, indicating that John Carroll Lynch would reprise his role.

=== Filming ===
In February 2017, it was announced the season would begin principal photography in June 2017. By the next month, filming was moved to May 2017. On May 24, 2017, writer and producer John J. Gray confirmed the show started filming.

=== Edits ===
On October 7, 2017, it was confirmed that the sixth episode of the season would be edited as a direct result of the 2017 Las Vegas shooting that occurred on October 1, 2017. The episode originally featured a scene lasting 2 minutes and 16 seconds where Leslie Grossman's character Meadow Wilton begins to fire at Evan Peters' character, as well as a crowd, during a campaign speech. The episode was edited to de-emphasize the violence and to mostly have it featured completely off-screen – as a result the opening sequence of the episode was cut in half, several on-screen deaths were removed and two separate close-up shots of the handgun firing were removed.

While only the edited episode was broadcast on FX, the original uncut episode was released via VOD, FXNOW and FX+.

== Reception ==
=== Critical response ===
American Horror Story: Cult received mostly positive reviews from critics. The review aggregator Rotten Tomatoes gave the season a 73% approval rating, with an average rating of 7.05/10, based on 218 reviews. The site's consensus reads, "American Horror Story: Cult intrigues with timely, over-the-top creepiness - and lots of clowns - despite being hampered by broad political generalizations and occasional holes in the narrative's logic." On Metacritic, the season was given a score of 66 out of 100 based on 24 reviews, indicating "generally positive reviews".

=== Ratings ===
Viewership and ratings per episode of American Horror Story: Cult
No.	Title	Air date	Rating (18–49)	Viewers (millions)	DVR (18–49)	DVR viewers (millions)	Total (18–49)	Total viewers (millions)
1	"Election Night"	September 5, 2017	2.0	3.93	TBD	TBD	TBD	TBD
2	"Don't Be Afraid of the Dark"	September 12, 2017	1.2	2.38	1.7	3.05	2.9	5.43
3	"Neighbors from Hell"	September 19, 2017	1.2	2.25	TBD	TBD	TBD	TBD
4	"11/9"	September 26, 2017	1.1	2.13	1.5	2.87	2.7	5.00
5	"Holes"	October 3, 2017	1.1	2.20	1.5	2.82	2.6	5.02
6	"Mid-Western Assassin"	October 10, 2017	1.0	2.15	1.2	2.28	2.2	4.43
7	"Valerie Solanas Died for Your Sins: Scumbag"	October 17, 2017	1.0	2.07	1.5	2.74	2.5	4.81
8	"Winter of Our Discontent"	October 24, 2017	1.0	2.06	1.4	2.56	2.4	4.62
9	"Drink the Kool-Aid"	October 31, 2017	0.7	1.48	1.4	2.56	2.1	4.04
10	"Charles (Manson) in Charge"	November 7, 2017	0.8	1.82	TBD	TBD	TBD	TBD
11	"Great Again"	November 14, 2017	1.0	1.97	TBD	TBD	TBD	TBD

Nielsen Media Research, which records streaming viewership on certain U.S. television screens, reported that American Horror Story: Cult garnered 358 million minutes of watch time, averaging 32.5 million minutes viewed per episode, between May 1, 2024, and August 31, 2026.

== Accolades ==
In its seventh season, the series has been nominated for 25 awards, 3 of them were won.

Year	Association	Category	Nominee(s)	Result
2018	8th Critics' Choice TV Awards	Best Actor in a Movie or Limited Series	Evan Peters	Nominated
2018	70th Writers Guild of America Awards	Long Form – Original	Brad Falchuk, John J. Gray, Joshua Green, Todd Kubrak, Crystal Liu, Tim Minear, Ryan Murphy, Adam Penn, James Wong	Nominated
2018	22nd Art Directors Guild Awards	Television Movie or Mini-Series	Jeffrey Mossa (for "Election Night" and "Winter of Our Discontent")	Nominated
2018	20th Costume Designers Guild Awards	Excellence in Contemporary Television	Sarah Evelyn Bram	Nominated
2018	Make-Up Artists and Hair Stylists Guild Awards	TV Miniseries or Movie Made for TV: Best Contemporary Make-Up	Eryn Krueger Mekash, Kim Ayers, Silvina Knight	Nominated
2018	Make-Up Artists and Hair Stylists Guild Awards	TV Miniseries or Movie Made for TV: Best Contemporary Hair Styling	Michelle Ceglia, Samantha Wade, Brittany Madrigal	Nominated
2018	Make-Up Artists and Hair Stylists Guild Awards	TV Miniseries or Movie Made for TV: Best Period and/or Character Hair Styling	Michelle Ceglia, Samantha Wade, Julie Rael	Nominated
2018	Make-Up Artists and Hair Stylists Guild Awards	TV Miniseries or Movie Made for TV: Best Special Make-Up Effects	Eryn Krueger Mekash, Michael Mekash, David Anderson	Won
2018	Make-Up Artists and Hair Stylists Guild Awards	Commercials and Music Videos: Best Make-Up	Kerry Herta, Jason Collins, Christina Waltz	Won
2018	Make-Up Artists and Hair Stylists Guild Awards	Commercials and Music Videos: Best Hair Styling	Nicki Alkire, Fernando Navarro, Stephanie Rives	Won
2018	16th Gold Derby Awards	Best Miniseries	American Horror Story: Cult	Nominated
2018	16th Gold Derby Awards	Best Miniseries/TV Movie Actor	Evan Peters	Nominated
2018	16th Gold Derby Awards	Best Miniseries/TV Movie Actress	Sarah Paulson	Nominated
2018	44th Saturn Awards	Best Horror Television Series	American Horror Story: Cult	Nominated
2018	44th Saturn Awards	Best Actress on Television	Sarah Paulson	Nominated
2018	44th Saturn Awards	Best Supporting Actor on Television	Evan Peters	Nominated
2018	44th Saturn Awards	Best Supporting Actress on Television	Adina Porter	Nominated
2018	29th GLAAD Media Awards	Outstanding TV Movie or Mini-Series	American Horror Story: Cult	Nominated
2018	70th Primetime Emmy Awards	Outstanding Lead Actress in a Limited/Anthology Series or Movie	Sarah Paulson	Nominated
2018	70th Primetime Emmy Awards	Outstanding Supporting Actress in a Limited/Anthology Series or Movie	Adina Porter	Nominated
2018	70th Primetime Creative Arts Emmy Awards	Outstanding Hairstyling for a Limited Series or Movie	Michelle Ceglia, Samantha Wade, Brittany Madrigal, Julie Rael, Valerie Jackson, Joanne Onorio	Nominated
2018	70th Primetime Creative Arts Emmy Awards	Outstanding Makeup (Non-Prosthetic)	Eryn Krueger Mekash, Kim Ayers, Michael Mekash, Silvina Knight, Carleigh Herbert	Nominated
2018	70th Primetime Creative Arts Emmy Awards	Outstanding Production Design for a Narrative Contemporary Program (One Hour or More)	Jeff Mossa, Rachel Robb Kondrath, Claire Kaufman	Nominated
2018	70th Primetime Creative Arts Emmy Awards	Outstanding Prosthetic Makeup	Eryn Krueger Mekash, Michael Mekash, Kim Ayers, Silvina Knight, Christopher Nelson, Carleigh Herbert, Glen Eisner, David Leroy Anderson	Nominated
2018	70th Primetime Creative Arts Emmy Awards	Outstanding Sound Editing for a Limited/ Anthology Series, Movie or Special	Gary Megregian, Naaman Haynes, Steve M. Stuhr, Timothy A. Cleveland, Paul Diller, Mitchell Lestner, Sam Munoz, David Klotz, Noel Vought (for "Great Again")	Nominated

== Home media ==
American Horror Story: Cult – The Complete Seventh Season
Set Details		Special Features
11 Episodes; 3 Disc Set (DVD); 3 Disc Set (BD); English 5.1 Dolby Digital, Spanish & French 2.0 Surround; Subtitles: English SDH, Spanish, French; Runtime: 509 Minutes		FX Promo Spots
Release Dates
Region 1	Region 2	Region 4
September 18, 2018	August 27, 2018	October 24, 2018
