= Simone (2002 film) =

Science fiction film by Andrew Niccol

- Theatrical release poster
- Directed by: Andrew Niccol
- Written by: Andrew Niccol
- Produced by: Andrew Niccol
- Starring: Al Pacino; Catherine Keener; Pruitt Taylor Vince; Jay Mohr
- Cinematography: Edward Lachman
- Edited by: Paul Rubell
- Music by: Carter Burwell
- Production company: Niccol Films
- Distributed by: New Line Cinema
- Release date: August 23, 2002
- Running time: 118 minutes
- Country: United States
- Language: English
- Budget: $10 million
- Box office: $19.6 million

Simone (stylized as S1M0NE) is a 2002 American satirical science fiction comedy film written, produced and directed by Andrew Niccol. The film stars Al Pacino, Catherine Keener, Evan Rachel Wood, Rachel Roberts, Jay Mohr and Winona Ryder.

The story follows a fading director who creates a virtual actress to star in his films and the attempts he makes to keep her non-presence a secret as she becomes more famous.

Simone garnered mixed reviews from critics, grossing $19.6 million worldwide against its $10 million budget.

== Plot ==
Viktor Taransky, a disillusioned director who has fallen out of favor in Hollywood, struggles to complete his new film when Nicola Anders, the lead actress, refuses to finish the film. His ex-wife, Elaine, who is also an executive producer, is frustrated with Taransky's antics and informs him his contract isn't being renewed. Taransky remains close with their daughter, Lainey.

Later that night, Taransky is approached by an old acquaintance, Hank Aleno, who tries discussing with him about an advanced program he created called “Simulation One” a program that enables the creation of a computer-generated woman, but Taransky quickly leaves. The next day, Taransky learns that Hank had passed away and left the program to him as his inheritance. Upon examining the program, Taransky realizes he can use it to play the film's central character. Taransky names his virtual actor "Simone", a composite name derived from the computer program's title, Simulation One.

Seamlessly incorporated into the film, Simone's performance, controlled by Taransky, becomes the highlight at the premiere. The film is a huge success, with Simone quickly attracting a large fanbase around the world and revitalizing Taransky's filmmaking career.

When questioned about Simone by the public, Taransky requests that her privacy be respected, but that merely intensifies media demands for her to appear. To satisfy demand, Taransky executes a number of progressively ambitious stunts that rely on misdirection and special effects.

Two tabloid reporters discover that Taransky used out-of-date stock photography as the background during an interview. Threatening to expose Taransky, the reporters blackmail him into providing Simone for a live appearance. He arranges for her to perform a song at a stadium event, appearing in a cloud of smoke and using holographic technology. As a result of the concert, Simone becomes even more famous, simultaneously becoming a double winner of the Academy Award for Best Actress, tied with herself.

Despite his success, Taransky grows tired of Simone constantly overshadowing him in the press, and his close relationship with Elaine has become strained due to the belief that Taransky and Simone are romantically involved. Deciding to ruin Simone, Taransky arranges Simone's "directorial debut" in her next film, I Am Pig, a tasteless treatment about zoophilia intended to disgust audiences. Not only does it fail to achieve the desired effect of audience alienation, it also serves to foster her credibility as an avant-garde artist.

Taransky's subsequent attempts to discredit Simone by having her drink, smoke and curse at public appearances, and use politically incorrect statements backfire when she is praised for her honesty. Taransky attempts to have Simone be replaced in her next film by Nicola Anders, but Nicola, an avid fan of Simone, refuses to replace her. As a last resort, Taransky decides to completely dispose of Simone by using a computer virus to erase her, tossing the hard drive and floppy disks into a steamer trunk, and dumping it at sea. Shortly after, Taransky announces to the press that she had died from a rare virus.

During the funeral, the police interrupt and arrest Taransky for the suspected murder of Simone. Taransky attempts to confess to police that Simone is a computer program, but fails to convince them. Taransky tries to prove it with the trunk containing the computer data, but when the trunk is retrieved from the ocean it is found empty, leading to further speculation from the public that Simone's remains were eaten by sharks.

While Taransky is in custody, Lainey, who'd been suspicious of Simone's existence, investigates Taransky's studio with Elaine to help him. Together, they discover Simone is indeed a program, proving Taransky was telling the truth. Lainey finds the virus source disk (Plague) and applies an anti-virus program to eradicate the computer virus. To save Taransky, they restore Simone, having her appear on national television to prove she's alive, much to the public's relief (and to Taransky's horror).

After his release, Taransky reconciles with his family. Together as a family again, they decide to continue the ruse with Simone and Taransky's "relationship" going public with a fake pregnancy announcement.

== Cast ==
- Al Pacino as Viktor Taransky
- Catherine Keener as Elaine Christian
- Pruitt Taylor Vince as Max Sayer
- Jay Mohr as Hal Sinclair
- Rachel Roberts as Simone
  - Kelly Anna Cox as Young Simone
- Jason Schwartzman as Milton
- Stanley Anderson as Frank Brand
- Evan Rachel Wood as Lainey Christian
- Daniel von Bargen as Chief Detective
- Winona Ryder as Nicola Anders
- Claudia Jordan as Simone Lookalike
- Elias Koteas as Hank Aleno (uncredited)
- Rebecca Romijn as Faith (uncredited)
- Joel Heyman as Male

== Production ==
Like Andrew Niccol's predecessor Gattaca, Simone deals with themes of the problematic aspects of technological advances being used to attempt to attain perfection. Unlike the former, however, Simone was Niccol's first attempt at a comedic satire with lighter moments and over-the-top drama. Niccol's first attempt at non-satire had been the earlier and more successful The Truman Show.

Pruitt Taylor Vince and Jason Schwartzman were cast as obese tabloid investigator Max Sayer and his shady-looking but peculiarly childlike assistant Milton, respectively. Rebecca Romijn was later cast in the role of Faith, Viktor's secretary, who is so obsessed with Simone that she begins dressing like Simone, dying her hair like Simone, and trying to have sex with Viktor so that she can hear him call her "Simone". These side actors built up much of the comedy surrounding the bizarre cultural phenomenon surrounding Simone.

Footage of character Holly Golightly from Breakfast At Tiffany's was obtained from Paramount Studios to be used in the film for part of the basis of the Simone character, while scenic footage used for Simone's "remote interview" backgrounds was obtained from Getty Images. Stylized elements that are present throughout the film and its credits include the use of the numeral 1 in place of the letter "I", and the numeral 0 in place of the letter "O". The style occurs for the duration of the film, including for all cast and crew names. Principal photography was by Edward Lachman, while the entirety of the production was made in California, using the Getty stock footage to fill in for locations such as Egypt's Great Pyramids.

Simone features a cover of "(You Make Me Feel Like) A Natural Woman" by Mary J. Blige, which Simone sings via hologram during a concert scene, and which plays during the closing credits.

Carter Burwell composed the film's score, which was released on CD.

=== Special effects ===
The film shows how the fake is produced using the chroma key technique. A post-credits sequence shows Viktor creating fake footage of Simone in a supermarket, which one of her pursuers sees and believes it to be real.

== Reception ==
=== Box office ===
The film opened at number 9 at the North American box-office, grossing $3,813,463 in its opening weekend. The film grossed $19,576,023 worldwide.

=== Critical response ===
Simone received mixed reviews from critics. Review aggregator Rotten Tomatoes gives it a 50% approval rating, based on 161 reviews, with an average rating of 5.8/10. The site's consensus reads: "The satire in S1m0ne lacks bite, and the plot isn't believable enough to feel relevant." Metacritic, which assigns a weighted average out of 100 top reviews from mainstream critics, calculated an average score of 49, based on 38 reviews, indicating "mixed or average" reviews.

Roger Ebert of the Chicago Sun-Times was critical of Niccol wasting his premise by giving it a broad appeal with "sitcom simplicity", and his cast with a narrow direction for their characters, saying, "He wants to edge it in the direction of a Hollywood comedy, but the satire is not sharp enough and the characters, including the ex-wife, are too routine."

The Guardian's Peter Bradshaw wrote, "It's reasonable material, but there are no real plot twists or unexpected implications; it all just rolls out easily in a Hollywood that director Niccol makes appear so unreal as to be an easy target."

Marc Savlov of The Austin Chronicle said, "What really irked me about Simone was that it stank of the very thing it appeared to be mocking: it's a big-budget, commercial film taking potshots at big-budget, commercial filmmaking (as well as overripe, over-earnest indies), and although it strives constantly for a sense of knowing, winking irony, the only thing ironic about it is how much it resembles its supposed target."

Elvis Mitchell of The New York Times said, "The writer-director Mr. Niccol is satirizing the kinds of dazzling empties he himself has made. [Mr. Niccol is] fascinated with surfaces—the films he's been involved with (he wrote The Truman Show and wrote and directed Gattaca) are a mix of populism and deconstruction. His newest effort, Simone, goes beyond postmodern to post-entertainment—it's tepid and vapid."

== See also ==
- VTuber (media phenomenon centering on virtual avatar entertainment)
- Pixel Perfect
- "The Waldo Moment"
- Tilly Norwood (an Artificial Intelligence-generated "actress")
