= Election Night (American Horror Story) =

- American Horror Story episode
- Episode no.: Season 7 Episode 1
- Directed by: Bradley Buecker
- Written by: Ryan Murphy; Brad Falchuk
- Production code: 7ATS01
- Original air date: September 5, 2017
- Running time: 49 minutes

Guest appearances
- John Carroll Lynch as Twisty the Clown; Colton Haynes as Det. Jack Samuels; Tim Kang as Tom Chang; Aimee Carrero as Picnic Girl; Cooper Dodson as Oz Mayfair-Richards; Rafael de la Fuente as Picnic Guy; Jorge-Luis Pallo as Pedro Morales; Zack Ward as Roger

Episode chronology
| ← Previous "Chapter 10" | Next → "Don't Be Afraid of the Dark" |
- American Horror Story: Cult

"Election Night" is the first episode and season premiere of the seventh season of the American horror anthology television series American Horror Story, subtitled Cult. It aired on September 5, 2017, on the cable network FX. The episode was written by Ryan Murphy and Brad Falchuk, and directed by Bradley Buecker.

== Plot ==
On election night, Ally Mayfair-Richards is horrified as Donald Trump is elected President of the United States. Ally's wife Ivy comforts her. Elsewhere, Kai Anderson is delighted by the news, while his sister Winter, having worked for Hillary Clinton's campaign, is devastated. Kai attends a city council meeting about security for a local Jewish community center. Tom Chang, a city council member and neighbor of Ally and Ivy, belittles Kai and the motion for increased security is unanimously passed.

Ally speaks with her therapist Dr. Rudy Vincent about her fears, including her coulrophobia. He suggests medication and a social media purge. As Ally goes about her day, she seems to be pursued by clowns.

Ally and Ivy discuss the state of their shared business, a restaurant called The Butchery on Main, and their marriage. They hire Winter as Oz's new nanny.

Kai harasses a group of Hispanic men on the street by yelling racial slurs and throwing a urine-filled condom at them. The men beat Kai up while an unseen party films it.

While Ally and Ivy have a date night at the restaurant, Winter attempts to desensitize Oz to violence by showing him videos of murders on the dark web. They arrive home to discover Tom Chang and his wife have been murdered. Oz claims to have witnessed the clowns murder them. Winter dismisses Oz's recollection, claiming that he has an overactive imagination. Detective Samuels rules the Changs’ deaths as a murder-suicide. Later that night, Ally screams in terror as she discovers a clown in her bed.

== Reception ==
"Election Night" was watched by 3.93 million people during its original broadcast, and gained a 2.0 ratings share among adults aged 18–49.

The episode received positive reviews from critics. On the review aggregator Rotten Tomatoes, "Election Night" holds an 85% approval rating, based on 20 reviews with an average rating of 7.83 out of 10. The critical consensus reads, "Filled with paranoia-fueled chills, 'Election Night' launches another unpredictable, satirical season of American Horror Story."

Matt Flower of IGN said the episode was off to a "promising start" and praised its use of satire and post-election paranoia, though criticized it for "being reductive and toothless" at its lows. Daniel D'Addario from Time praised the episode for feeling like a horror story, the cinematography, and the performances.

However, Laura Bradley of Vanity Fair criticized the episode for the "uninteresting, tired interpretation of politics". She criticized the characters of Ally and Kai and the simplistic theme of fear, but called the performances "nuanced and sardonically witty". She concluded by finding it hard to enjoy the season with the "lazy, cynical political allegory."
