= Rachel Roberts (model) =

Canadian actress and model (born 1978)

- Born: April 8, 1978 (age 48); Vancouver, British Columbia, Canada
- Occupations: Model, actress
- Years active: 1998–present
- Spouse: Andrew Niccol (m. 2002)
- Children: 2
- Modeling information
- Height: 1.75 m (5 ft 9 in)
- Hair color: Blonde
- Eye color: Green
- Agency: One Management (New York); Karin Models (Paris); d'management group (Milan); Models 1 (London); View Management (Barcelona); Iconic Management (Berlin); Next Model Management (Los Angeles); Lizbell Agency (Vancouver)

Rachel Roberts (born April 8, 1978) is a Canadian model and actress. Roberts has appeared in numerous ad campaigns, most notably for Biotherm Skin Care Products, and she became well known in the United States as the title character in the 2002 film Simone.

== Modeling career ==
When she began modeling, she worked for magazines such as Elle, Vogue, Harper's Bazaar, Glamour, Marie Claire and the Sports Illustrated Swimsuit Issue of 2000, Victoria's Secret Country 1998, 1999 and Victoria's Secret lookbook 2000, 2001.

As skin-care line Biotherm's official model, she posed for campaigns for labels such as Ralph Lauren, Gap, Bottega Veneta, Ferre, Sisley, and Victoria's Secret. She has modeled for multiple designers such as Chloé, Valentino, Givenchy, Fendi, Blumarine, Roberto Cavalli, Comme des Garçons, Paul Smith and Balmain. She also appeared in the European advertisements of Nivea.

== Acting career ==
Roberts made her film debut as the title character of the movie Simone in 2002 performing opposite Al Pacino. The studio attempted to keep her identity a secret during production, and did not accord her credit in the initial theatrical release, in an effort to maintain the illusion that her character was a virtual computer-created entity. After release her identity became known and she received credit in the video release.

She has guest-starred on such television series as Entourage, Ugly Betty and Numbers. She was given a recurring role on the ABC one-hour drama FlashForward. In 2011, she played Carrera in the movie In Time opposite Justin Timberlake and Amanda Seyfried. She appeared in the series CSI: Crime Scene Investigation as Karen Chevera in the episode "Unplugged" (2012). She played Soul Fleur in the 2013 movie The Host. Roberts appeared on Mad Men opposite Jon Hamm in the episode "Tale of Two Cities". She starred in Rihanna's music video "Bitch Better Have My Money" which was released on July 2, 2015. She was cast as Cassandra in Andrew Niccol's sci-fi thriller film Anon. She also portrayed Sharon Tate in the tenth episode of American Horror Story: Cult.

== Personal life ==
Roberts was born in Vancouver, British Columbia, Canada. In 2002, she married New Zealand director Andrew Niccol, who wrote, produced and directed Simone and Anon. They have two children, a son and daughter.

== Filmography ==
=== Film ===
Year	Title	Role	Notes
2002	Simone	Simone	
2009	How to Seduce Difficult Women	Sabrina	
2011	In Time	Carrera	
2013	The Host	Soul Fleur	
2018	Anon	Alysa Egorian	

=== Television ===
Year	Title	Role	Notes
2004	Still Life	Nona	Unaired television series
2007	Ugly Betty	Marla	Episode: "Secretaries' Day"
2007	Entourage	Monika	Episode: "Gary's Desk"
2008	Numbers	Melissa Conroy	Episode: "Charlie Don't Surf"
2009–2010	FlashForward	Alda Hertzog	Recurring role; 5 episodes
2012	CSI: Crime Scene Investigation	Karen Chevera	Episode: "CSI Unplugged"
2013	Mad Men	Cindy	Episode: "A Tale of Two Cities"
2017	American Horror Story: Cult	Sharon Tate	Episode: "Charles (Manson) in Charge"

=== Music videos ===
Year	Title	Role	Artist
2015	"Bitch Better Have My Money"	The Accountant's Wife	Rihanna

== Agencies ==
- Liz Bell, Vancouver (mother agency)
- MODELS 1 London
- ONE MANAGEMENT New York
- NEXT Los Angeles
- D MANAGEMENT Milan
- VIEW Spain
- ICONIC Berlin
