= Bradley Buecker =

American television and film director

- Other name: Brad Buecker
- Occupations: Television and film director, producer and editor
- Years active: 2000–present
- Notable work: Glee; American Horror Story
- Spouse: Robyn VanTol Buecker

Bradley Buecker is an American television and film director, producer, and editor. He is well known for his work with Ryan Murphy and Brad Falchuk for their series Glee and American Horror Story.

== Career ==
Buecker's first credited job in the entertainment industry was as an editor for the TV documentary Hollywood Remembers Dustin Hoffman. He worked as an editor during 2002 on the ABC reality series The Bachelor.

In 2005 he was hired as an editor on the FX series Nip/Tuck, where he first worked for Murphy and Falchuk.

He went on to edit the pilot episode of Glee for Murphy, Falchuk, and Ian Brennan and became a mainstay editor for the entire run of the series. During its run is when Buecker directed his first hour of television, with the episode "Never Been Kissed". He served as an executive producer and main director on the series' last season, directing the series finale.

Buecker was involved with the development of Falchuk/Murphy's American Horror Story. He served as editor of the first episode, as well as a co-executive producer during the anthology series' first cycle, Murder House. He helmed the series' first-season finale, "Afterbirth". With the commencement of the second series, Asylum, Buecker was promoted to executive producer, as well as serving as director for the premiere, "Welcome to Briarcliff".

He directed the 4th episode, "Haunted House", of Brennan, Murphy and Falchuk's Fox series Scream Queens and the 2nd episode of the 2nd series, Warts and All.

== Filmography ==
Film
Year	Title	Contribution	Notes
2015	Billy Boy	Director, producer, editor	

Television
Title	Season	Episode name	Episode #	Contribution	Notes
Glee	Season 2	"Never Been Kissed"	6	Supervising producer, director	
Glee	Season 2	"Comeback"	13	Supervising producer, director	
Glee	Season 2	"Original Song"	16	Supervising producer, director	
Glee	Season 2	"Funeral"	21	Supervising producer, director	
Glee	Season 3	"The First Time"	5	Co-executive producer, director	
Glee	Season 3	"Hold On to Sixteen"	8	Co-executive producer, director	
Glee	Season 3	"On My Way"	14	Co-executive producer, director	
Glee	Season 3	"Saturday Night Glee-ver"	16	Co-executive producer, director	
Glee	Season 4	"Thanksgiving"	8	Co-executive producer, director	
Glee	Season 4	"Sadie Hawkins"	11	Co-executive producer, director	
Glee	Season 4	"Feud"	16	Co-executive producer, director	
Glee	Season 4	"Shooting Star"	18	Co-executive producer, director	
Glee	Season 4	"All or Nothing"	22	Co-executive producer, director	
Glee	Season 5	"Love, Love, Love"	1	Executive producer, director	
Glee	Season 5	"Frenemies"	9	Executive producer, director	
Glee	Season 5	"Bash"	15	Executive producer, director	
Glee	Season 5	"Old Dog, New Tricks"	19	Executive producer, director	
Glee	Season 6	"Loser Like Me"	1	Executive producer, director	
Glee	Season 6	"Homecoming"	2	Executive producer, director	
Glee	Season 6	"A Wedding"	8	Executive producer, director	Co-directed with Ian Brennan
Glee	Season 6	"Dreams Come True"	13	Executive producer, director	
Survivor's Remorse	Season 1	"The Decisions"	4	Director	
The New Normal	Season 1	"Stay-At-Home Dad"	13	Director, co-executive producer	
The New Normal	Season 1	"Dairy Queen"	15	Director, co-executive producer	
American Horror Story	Murder House	"Murder House"	3	Director, co-executive producer	
American Horror Story	Murder House	"Afterbirth"	12	Director, co-executive producer	
American Horror Story	Asylum	"Welcome to Briarcliff"	1	Director, executive producer	
American Horror Story	Asylum	"Tricks and Treats"	2	Director, executive producer	
American Horror Story	Coven	"The Dead"	7	Director, executive producer	
American Horror Story	Coven	"Protect the Coven"	11	Director, executive producer	
American Horror Story	Freak Show	"Blood Bath"	8	Director, executive producer	
American Horror Story	Freak Show	"Orphans"	10	Director, executive producer	
American Horror Story	Freak Show	"Curtain Call"	13	Director, executive producer	
American Horror Story	Hotel	"Chutes and Ladders"	2	Director, executive producer	
American Horror Story	Hotel	"Mommy"	3	Director, executive producer	
American Horror Story	Hotel	"She Gets Revenge"	10	Director, executive producer	
American Horror Story	Hotel	"Be Our Guest"	12	Director, executive producer	
American Horror Story	Roanoke	"Chapter 1"	1	Director, executive producer	
American Horror Story	Roanoke	"Chapter 10"	10	Director, executive producer	
American Horror Story	Cult	"Election Night"	1	Director, executive producer	
American Horror Story	Cult	"Mid-Western Assassin"	6	Director, executive producer	
American Horror Story	Cult	"Charles (Manson) in Charge"	10	Director, executive producer	
American Horror Story	Apocalypse	"The End"	1	Director, executive producer	
American Horror Story	Apocalypse	"Sojourn"	8	Director, executive producer	
American Horror Story	Apocalypse	"Apocalypse Then"	10	Director, executive producer	
American Horror Story	1984	"Camp Redwood"	1	Director, executive producer	
American Horror Story	Delicate	"Opening Night"	6	Director	
Scream Queens	Season 1	"Haunted House"	4	Director	
Scream Queens	Season 1	"Dorkus"	12	Director	
Scream Queens	Season 2	"Warts and All"	2	Director	
9-1-1	Season 1	"Pilot"	1	Director; executive producer	
9-1-1	Season 1	"Worst Day Ever"	4	Director; executive producer	
9-1-1	Season 1	"Heartbreaker"	6	Director; executive producer	
9-1-1	Season 1	"A Whole New You"	10	Director; executive producer	
9-1-1	Season 2	"7.1"	2	Director; executive producer	
9-1-1	Season 2	"Merry ExMas"	10	Director; executive producer	
9-1-1	Season 2	"Broken"	14	Director; executive producer	
9-1-1	Season 2	"Careful What You Wish For"	17	Director; executive producer	
9-1-1	Season 2	"This Life We Choose"	18	Director; executive producer	
9-1-1	Season 3	"Sink Or Swim"	2	Director; executive producer	
9-1-1	Season 5	"Panic"	1	Director; executive producer	
9-1-1	Season 5	"Desperate Times"	2	Director; executive producer	
9-1-1	Season 6	"In a Flash"	10	Director; executive producer	
9-1-1	Season 7	"Rock the Boat"	2	Director; executive producer	
9-1-1	Season 7	"Capsized"	3	Director; executive producer	
9-1-1	Season 8	"When the Boeing Gets Tough..."	2	Director; executive producer	
9-1-1	Season 8	"Final Approach"	3	Director; executive producer	
9-1-1	Season 8	"Sob Stories"	9	Director; executive producer	
9-1-1	Season 9	"Spiraling"	2	Director; executive producer	
9-1-1	Season 9	"The Sky is Falling"	3	Director; executive producer	
9-1-1	Season 9	"Reentry"	4	Director; executive producer	
9-1-1	Season 9	"Handle with Care"	10	Director; executive producer	
9-1-1	Season 9	"Hearts and Flowers"	18	Director; executive producer	
9-1-1	Season 10	"That Sinking Feeling"	1	Director; executive producer	
9-1-1	Season 10	"Fire in the Hole"	2	Director; executive producer	
9-1-1	Season 10	"Streets of Fire"	3	Director; executive producer	
9-1-1: Lone Star	Season 1	"Pilot"	1	Director; executive producer	
9-1-1: Lone Star	Season 1	"Yee-Haw"	2	Director; executive producer	
9-1-1: Lone Star	Season 1	"Studs"	5	Director; executive producer	
9-1-1: Lone Star	Season 1	"Austin, We Have A Problem"	10	Director; executive producer	
9-1-1: Lone Star	Season 2	"Back In The Saddle"	1	Director; executive producer	
9-1-1: Lone Star	Season 2	"2100"	2	Director; executive producer	
9-1-1: Lone Star	Season 2	"Hold The Line"	3	Director; executive producer	
9-1-1: Lone Star	Season 2	"Bad Call"	8	Director; executive producer	
9-1-1: Lone Star	Season 3	"The Big Chill"	1	Director; executive producer	
9-1-1: Lone Star	Season 3	"Thin Ice"	2	Director; executive producer	
9-1-1: Lone Star	Season 3	"Stock & Thaw"	3	Director; executive producer	
9-1-1: Lone Star	Season 3	"Prince Albert in a Can"	11	Director; executive producer	
9-1-1: Lone Star	Season 3	"Impulse Control"	14	Director; executive producer	
9-1-1: Lone Star	Season 4	"The New Hotness"	1	Director; executive producer	
9-1-1: Lone Star	Season 4	"Double Trouble"	11	Director; executive producer	
9-1-1: Lone Star	Season 5	"Trainwrecks"	2	Director; executive producer	
9-1-1: Lone Star	Season 5	"CI2"	3	Director; executive producer	
9-1-1: Lone Star	Season 5	"All Who Wander"	10	Director; executive producer	
9-1-1: Lone Star	Season 5	"Homecoming"	12	Director; executive producer	
Doctor Odyssey	Season 1	"Plastic Surgery Week"	3	Director; executive producer	
9-1-1: Nashville	Season 1	"Pilot"	1	Director; executive producer	
9-1-1: Nashville	Season 1	"Hell and High Water"	2	Director; executive producer	
9-1-1: Nashville	Season 1	"Forces of Nature"	3	Director; executive producer	
9-1-1: Nashville	Season 1	"Where There's Smoke"	16	Director; executive producer	
