= Good Kill =

2014 film

- Promotional poster
- Directed by: Andrew Niccol
- Written by: Andrew Niccol
- Produced by: Andrew Niccol; Mark Amin; Nicolas Chartier; Zev Foreman
- Starring: Ethan Hawke; Bruce Greenwood; Zoë Kravitz; Jake Abel; January Jones
- Cinematography: Amir Mokri
- Edited by: Zach Staenberg
- Music by: Christophe Beck
- Production companies: Voltage Pictures; Sobini Films
- Distributed by: IFC Films
- Release dates: September 5, 2014 (Venice); May 15, 2015 (US)
- Running time: 102 minutes
- Country: United States
- Language: English
- Box office: $1.5 million

Good Kill is a 2014 American drama film written and directed by Andrew Niccol. The film stars Ethan Hawke, Bruce Greenwood, Zoë Kravitz, Jake Abel, and January Jones. It competed for the Golden Lion at the 71st Venice International Film Festival. It was also screened in the Special Presentations section of the 2014 Toronto International Film Festival.

== Plot ==
Major Thomas Egan is an officer with the U.S. Air Force stationed at an Air Force Base near Las Vegas, Nevada. He is a former F-16 Falcon pilot, married, with two children who live with him in a suburban house off-base. His current assignment involves flying armed MQ-9 Reaper drones in foreign air space in support of the U.S. war on terror. He is admired by his commanding officer and support staff for his calm demeanor, precise flying, and adaptability. Privately, he is concerned about the assignment, which he took after being informed there was reduced call for and increased competition among fighter pilots in the Air Force. His previous CO informed him that a tour flying unmanned aerial vehicles (UAVs) would look good on his record and would increase his chances of being posted back to a flying assignment.

At first, the new assignment seems stressful but relatively benign. He is assigned to attack more clear-cut terrorist cells, vehicles, and facilities in Afghanistan. He flies these assignments during daylight hours over his targets, which is night-time in Las Vegas, leaving his days free for his sleep period, and to spend time with his wife and children. However, the high-tempo assignment – he is attacking targets on almost a daily basis – begins taking its toll. His wife notices the stress he's under and he begins drinking when off-duty.

Still, his performance is excellent and his crew is rated among the highest in the squadron, so, on the orders of his commanding officer, he is assigned to more challenging missions under the direction of CIA controllers. Many of these targets are in Yemen and Somalia, places where the U.S. has no acknowledged military mission. The targets themselves are increasingly morally ambiguous: crowds the CIA controller calls terrorist cells, public buildings the controller says are sleeping spots for high level terrorist leaders or factories for making explosives. Collateral damage goes from being a rare occurrence to a routine one. On several occasions, the CIA controller orders strikes on obvious civilian targets – including women and children – describing these casualties as unfortunate but necessitated by terrorist leaders using them as human shields.

Egan's performance declines and his drinking intensifies. He narrowly avoids being arrested for drunk driving, and starts avoiding home commitments, not wanting to inflict the stress he's under on his wife. He relishes a rare overwatch assignment protecting U.S. troops as they sleep, but must break a promise to his wife in order to perform the mission. On another overwatch mission, the troops are killed by an improvised explosive device that Egan could not protect them from. After a stress-induced violent episode at home, Egan's wife demands to know the details of Egan's work, and Egan tells her. She appears appalled. Soon after, she says she is leaving him and taking the children to Reno, Nevada, blaming his drinking and violent behavior.

Finally, Egan cracks. His CIA controller orders a strike on a small group of civilians responding to an explosion at a building Egan had previously destroyed. Rather than obey the order, Egan simulates a glitch in the UAV control system and the targets escape. His CO has no choice but to demote him away from the attack role into a surveillance one. While on a surveillance mission, Egan notices a man whom he had previously watched rape a woman several times approaching her home. His Mission Intelligence Coordinator had previously described this man as "a bad guy. But not our bad guy." Egan conspires to send his support staff on a break, then uses the surveillance UAV to attack and kill the rapist. He then leaves the base without orders and is seen driving away from Las Vegas toward Reno.

== Cast ==
- Ethan Hawke as Major Tommy Egan
- January Jones as Molly Egan
- Zoë Kravitz as A1C Vera Suarez
- Jake Abel as Mission Intelligence Coordinator (M.I.C.) Joe Zimmer
- Bruce Greenwood as Lieutenant Colonel Jack Johns
- Peter Coyote as "Langley" (CIA controller voice)
- Ryan Montano as Airman Roy Carlos
- Dylan Kenin as Captain Ed Christie

== Critical reception ==
Good Kill received positive reviews. As of June 2020, the film holds a score of 63 out of 100 on review website Metacritic, based on 33 critics and indicating "generally favorable" reviews. The film holds a 75% approval rating on Rotten Tomatoes, based on 124 critics with an average rating of 6.38 out of 10. The website's critics consensus reads: "Thought-provoking, timely, and anchored by a strong performance from Ethan Hawke, Good Kill is a modern war movie with a troubled conscience."

== See also ==
- List of films featuring drones
