= Andrew Niccol =

New Zealand filmmaker (born 1964)

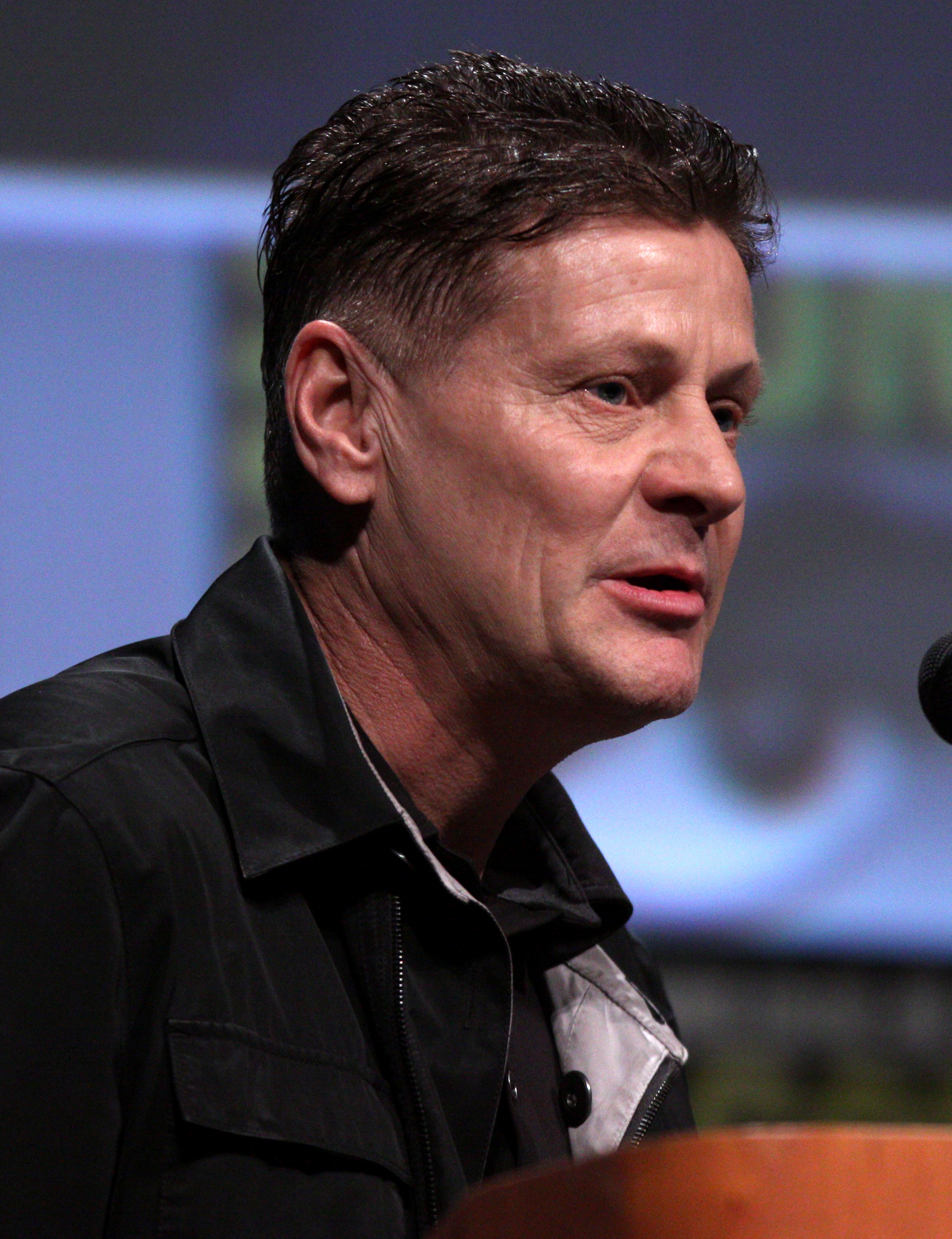
- Niccol in 2012
- Born: 10 June 1964 (age 62); Paraparaumu, New Zealand
- Occupations: Screenwriter; film director; film producer
- Spouses: Susan Jennifer Sullivan (m. 1991; div. 2002); Rachel Roberts (m. 2002)
- Children: 3

Andrew Niccol (born 10 June 1964) is a New Zealand filmmaker. He wrote and directed Gattaca (1997), Simone (2002), Lord of War (2005), In Time (2011), The Host (2013), and Good Kill (2014). He wrote and co-produced The Truman Show, which earned him a nomination for the Academy Award for Best Original Screenplay and won him the BAFTA Award in the same category. His high-concept science fiction films tend to explore social, cultural and political issues; artificial realities and simulations are frequent themes in his work.

His film Good Kill was selected to compete for the Golden Lion at the 71st Venice International Film Festival.

== Early and personal life ==
Niccol was born in Paraparaumu, New Zealand, and grew up in Auckland, where he attended Auckland Grammar School beginning in 1973. He left New Zealand at age 21 and began directing TV ads in London, which he did for more than ten years before his directorial debut, Gattaca (1997). During production of Simone, he met model and actress Rachel Roberts, with whom he has two children, Jack, born in 2003 (who also played "Young Nicolai" in the 2005 film Lord of War) and Ava, born in 2008.

== Career ==
=== Directing ===
Niccol has directed the films Gattaca (1997), Simone (2002), Lord of War (2005), In Time (2011), The Host (2013), and Good Kill (2014) (reuniting after 17 years with actor Ethan Hawke in a lead role; Hawke also appeared in Lord of War as a supporting character named Jack Valentine). He has also directed a short film entitled The Minutes (2012), which is a documentary-esque, narrative tie-in to In Time that describes in more detail the world and characters from the film.

For his directorial debut and first film (which he also wrote), Gattaca (1997), he won a Best Film award from the Sitges - Catalan International Film Festival and both a Special Jury Prize and the Fun Trophy from the Gérardmer Film Festival.

For his film Lord of War (2005), he received a Special Recognition for Excellence in Filmmaking from the National Board of Review.

In June 2021, Niccol was named as the director and writer of a film based on the Christchurch mosque shootings called They Are Us. The filmmakers' choice to focus on New Zealand prime minister Jacinda Ardern's response rather than the victims generated criticism within New Zealand. In response to public backlash, Niccols confirmed that the film's development had been put on hold until a full consultation with the New Zealand Muslim community had been conducted.

=== Writing and producing ===
Niccol's breakthrough screenplay was his script for the film The Truman Show (1998), directed by Peter Weir and starring Jim Carrey. He also served as a producer on the film. The film received an Academy Award nomination for Best Original Screenplay (Best Writing, Screenplay Written Directly for the Screen) and a Golden Globe nomination for Best Screenplay in 1999 and won a BAFTA award for Best Screenplay, a Saturn Award for Best Writing or Best Writer, an Awards Circuit Community Award for Best Original Screenplay and Best Motion Picture, a Hugo Award for Best Dramatic Presentation (shared with Peter Weir), and an Online Film Critics Society Award for Best Original Screenplay.

Niccol has written all the films he has directed and produced several of them. In 1999, he received the ALFS Award for "Screenwriter of the Year" from the London Critics Circle Film Awards for his screenwriting work on The Truman Show (1998) and Gattaca (1997).

Niccol co-wrote the story for The Terminal, directed by Steven Spielberg. He also served as an executive producer on the film.

== Filmography ==
Year	Title	Director	Writer	Producer
1997	Gattaca	Yes	Yes	No
1998	The Truman Show	No	Yes	Yes
2002	Simone	Yes	Yes	Yes
2004	The Terminal	No	Story	Executive
2005	Lord of War	Yes	Yes	Yes
2011	In Time	Yes	Yes	Yes
2013	The Host	Yes	Yes	No
2014	Good Kill	Yes	Yes	Yes
2018	Anon	Yes	Yes	Yes
2026	I, Object	Yes	Yes	Yes
2027	Lords of War	Yes	Yes	No

== Awards and nominations ==
Year	Title	Award/Nomination
1997	Gattaca	Sitges Film Festival for Best Film; London Film Critics' Circle Award for Screenwriter of the Year
1998	The Truman Show	BAFTA Award for Best Original Screenplay; Saturn Award for Best Writing; London Film Critics' Circle Award for Screenwriter of the Year; Nominated: Academy Award for Best Original Screenplay; Nominated: Golden Globe Award for Best Screenplay; Nominated: Online Film Critics Society Award for Best Original Screenplay; Nominated: Chicago Film Critics Association Award for Best Screenplay; Nominated: Writers Guild of America for Best Screenplay
2014	Good Kill	Nominated: Golden Lion
