= Anon (film) =

2018 film by Andrew Niccol

- Release poster
- Directed by: Andrew Niccol
- Written by: Andrew Niccol
- Produced by: Oda Schaefer; Oliver Simon; Daniel Baur; Andrew Niccol
- Starring: Clive Owen; Amanda Seyfried; Colm Feore; Mark O'Brien; Sonya Walger; Joe Pingue; Iddo Goldberg
- Cinematography: Amir Mokri
- Edited by: Álex Rodríguez
- Music by: Christophe Beck
- Production companies: K5 International; Sierra/Affinity; Road Pictures; Scythia Films Inc.; Cutting Edge Group; K5 Film
- Distributed by: Netflix (United States and Canada); Koch Films (Germany)
- Release dates: 4 May 2018 (Netflix); 25 October 2018 (Germany)
- Running time: 100 minutes
- Countries: Canada; Germany; United States
- Language: English
- Box office: $1.2 million

Anon is a 2018 cyberpunk thriller film written and directed by Andrew Niccol. An international co-production of Canada, Germany and the United States, the film stars Clive Owen and Amanda Seyfried, with Colm Feore, Mark O'Brien, Sonya Walger, Joe Pingue and Iddo Goldberg appearing in supporting roles. Set in a futuristic world where privacy and anonymity no longer exist, the plot follows a troubled detective (Owen) who comes across a young woman (Seyfried) who has evaded the government's transparency system.

The film was released in the United States, Canada and other territories on Netflix on 4 May 2018.

== Plot ==
In the near future, humanity lives in a technologically advanced, dystopian society. The government requires that everyone receive an ocular implant that records everything they see. The implant provides an augmented-reality head-up display to the user with information about anyone and anything they may see, as well as recording the user's view. Investigations into crimes amount to detectives reviewing video and assessing whether an alleged perpetrator is innocent or guilty.

Sal Friedland, a detective with the metropolitan police force, crosses paths with a young woman who appears to trigger a glitch in his ocular implant, as no data about her is retrieved. When he reviews his own record of that day, he finds that every single frame of her has been mysteriously deleted. At work, Sal is handed several homicide cases where the victims' own visual records of their deaths are replaced with the killer's point of view, thus hiding the killer's identity. At another murder scene, Sal chases the apparent killer only to nearly be killed when they hack his implant and change what he sees in real time.

It is discovered that all the victims hired someone with the expertise to delete pieces of their visual records that were either humiliating or incriminating. The detectives determine that the unknown woman Sal encountered earlier has the ability to manipulate the system in this way, making her their primary suspect. Sal goes undercover, creating a false history as a stockbroker who engages in a brief affair with a prostitute. Using this as the pretext for her services, he makes contact with the woman —who uses the handle 'Anon'— and asks to have his encounter with the prostitute deleted. With his team on standby in the adjacent apartment, the initial plan to apprehend Anon fails when she successfully covers her tracks.

Sal and Anon develop a personal relationship. She discovers Sal's true identity and flees, apparently killing one of Sal's colleagues in the process. Anon begins to harass Sal for his betrayal, tormenting him with his worst memories, deleting his memories of his dead son, and causing further hallucinations. His superiors confront him after his neighbor turns up dead with a bullet from Sal's gun in him rejecting his explanation and order him off the case.

Despite being under house arrest, Sal tracks Anon to her apartment and tells her that she is being investigated for multiple murders. She reveals that she already knows this and that she is being framed by another hacker with a similar skillset. Anon shows Sal her video record of the second sting operation, in which his colleague was killed, seeming to prove that she is innocent. After showing Sal her records, she flees again.

Believing Sal has become too personally involved, his superiors suspend him from active duty. The actual killer attempts to murder him in his apartment, revealing himself to be Cyrus Frear, one of the technical experts from the police department. Cyrus has been obsessed with Anon for years killing anyone who had sex with her out of jealousy and erased every trace of her, even peoples' memories. During a physical altercation between Cyrus and Anon, Sal draws his weapon, but realizes that Cyrus is seeing what he sees in real-time. To defeat this advantage, Sal fires blindly towards Cyrus, successfully killing him.

Anon leaves, later revealing to Sal that she is able to bypass the vast surveillance network by disseminating her records in microsecond slices throughout everyone else in the network, rendering her untraceable. When Sal asks her why she is so desperate to hide her identity, she tells him that her quest for anonymity is not because she has something to hide, but merely because she does not want to share herself with the world.

== Cast ==
- Clive Owen as Sal Frieland
- Amanda Seyfried as The Girl/Anon
- Colm Feore as Detective Charles Gattis
- Mark O'Brien as Cyrus Frear
- Sonya Walger as Kristen
- Joe Pingue as Lester Hagen
- Iddo Goldberg as Joseph Kenik
- Sebastian Pigott as Detective Vardy
- Conrad Coates as Detective Fuchs
- Mayko Nguyen as Detective Dyer
- Jordan Claire Robbins as Elaine Selak
- Rachel Roberts as Alysa Egorian
- Ethan Tavares as Salvador Jr.
- Alyson Bath as Krystal

== Production ==
On 28 January 2016, Clive Owen was cast in the film to play the role of a detective in a world without privacy. On 8 March 2016, Amanda Seyfried came on board to star in the film, playing a woman with no digital footprint who is invisible to the police.

Principal photography on the film began in early September 2016 in New York City, while other scenes were shot in Toronto, with many shots being filmed at the University of Toronto Scarborough.

== Release ==
Anon was released in the United States, Canada and other territories on Netflix on 4 May 2018. In the United Kingdom and Ireland, the film was released theatrically by Altitude Film Distribution and through on-demand by Sky Cinema on 11 May 2018. It was released in Germany on DVD and Blu-ray on 25 October 2018 by Koch Films.

== Reception ==
On the review aggregator website Rotten Tomatoes, the film holds an approval rating of 36% based on 50 reviews, with an average rating of 5.2/10. The website's critics consensus reads, "Lacking enough depth to fulfill its evident ambitions or enough excitement to work as a sci-fi action thriller, Anon lives down to its title in the most glumly predictable ways." Metacritic, which uses a weighted average, assigned the film a score of 54 out of 100, based on 11 critic reviews, indicating "mixed or average" reviews.

On RogerEbert.com, Nick Allen gave the film 2.5 stars out of 4, saying that as Niccol's film lays out its sci-fi rules, "Anon can be as much fun as listening to someone explain every single rule of a board game, when all you want is to just start playing." Peter Bradshaw of The Guardian gave the film 2 stars out of 5, saying: "The impact of the action is lost because we can't be sure of the status of what appears to be happening, and there is something a little bit boring about the conundrum." Stephen Dalton of The Hollywood Reporter wrote, "Niccol's paranoid anxieties about the totalitarian dangers of cyberspace feel oddly glib and dated, light on thrills or narrative logic." Blake Goble of Consequence of Sound gave the film a "B" grade, saying: "While the film's final thesis is a Facebook post with typos at best (delete your accounts, and so on), Niccol is still terrific when he's breaking down rules, questioning protocol, and testing new ideas." James Dyer of Empire gave the film 3 stars out of 5, saying: "With a story that serves mainly as delivery mechanism for its message this is no [The] Truman Show or Gattaca, but comfortably more coherent than In Time and buoyed by its chilling relevance."
