= Crystal Liu =

American television writer

- Occupation: Television writer
- Years active: 2003–present

Crystal Liu is an American television writer.

She is well known for her work on FX's American Horror Story.

== Career ==
Liu got her start as a production assistant on the 75th Academy Awards. She went on to serve as an assistant to executive producers on NBC's Lipstick Jungle, for the entirety of its two-season run. She served as an associate producer for one episode of Maneater. She first worked with Brad Falchuk and Ryan Murphy on their Fox musical comedy Glee, as script coordinator. A position she served in during the shows third year. In 2011, the writing duo recruited Liu to their new FX series American Horror Story. She worked as script coordinator from the pilot to the end of the third season; she was then promoted to staff writer for the fourth season; before receiving another promotion to story editor during American Horror Story: Hotel. She has contributed four scripts for the series.
