= Billy Eichner =

American comedian and actor (born 1978)

- Eichner in 2026
- Born: September 18, 1978 (age 48); New York City, U.S.
- Education: Northwestern University
- Political party: Democratic

Comedy career
- Years active: 2005–present
- Genres: Improvisational comedy; sketch comedy; musical comedy; physical comedy

Billy Eichner (/ˈaɪknər/ IKE-nər; born September 18, 1978) is an American comedian, actor, singer, screenwriter, and television show host. He is the star, executive producer, and creator of Funny or Die's Billy on the Street, a comedy game show that aired on various platforms.

== Early life and education ==
Eichner was born and raised in Queens, New York City. He lived in the Forest Hills neighborhood of Queens. He is the son of Debbie, who worked for a phone company, and Jay Eichner, a rent tax auditor. He was born to a Jewish family and had a Madonna-themed bar mitzvah. He has an older half-brother. He graduated from Stuyvesant High School in 1996, and from Northwestern University in 2000 with a BA in Theater. Actor Robin Lord Taylor was his college roommate.

== Career ==
Eichner gained attention as the host and writer of Creation Nation: A Live Talk Show, a critically acclaimed stage show in New York. He landed a Bravo web series called My Life on the Z-List: Jen's Vlog that was an online companion to Kathy Griffin: My Life on the D-List and was a co-host on the Bravo television pilot Joan Rivers' Straight Talk, where Rivers discussed topics with four gay men. He appeared on Conan as a special correspondent in original video shorts.

In 2011, Eichner starred in the show Billy on the Street. The show initially aired on Fuse, before moving to truTV. It was created within Funny or Die. It had a final run of short-form episodes across digital platforms in association with Lyft. In it, Eichner manically roams the streets of New York City, asking unsuspecting pedestrians trivia questions, often accompanied by celebrity guests.

In August 2013, Eichner guest starred in the sixth season of Parks and Recreation. Eichner's first episode aired on October 10, 2013. He stars as Donna's Eagleton counterpart, Craig Middlebrooks, who joins the Pawnee Parks and Recreation Department when Pawnee absorbs Eagleton. He became a series regular in episode four of the seventh season of the show. During the 66th Primetime Emmy Awards show in 2014, Eichner appeared with host Seth Meyers on the streets of New York, interviewing random people.

Eichner starred in the Hulu original series Difficult People, with Julie Klausner. It was executive produced by Amy Poehler. Though originally set up for USA Network, the series began airing on Hulu in August 2015.

In 2016, Eichner appeared in Neighbors 2: Sorority Rising, released May 20. In 2017, he joined the cast of American Horror Story for recurring roles in its seventh and eighth seasons. Eichner was a recurring guest on the comedy series Friends from College.

In 2019, Eichner provided the voice of Timon in Disney's live action remake of The Lion King, from director Jon Favreau. Eichner said that Timon is "such a great role that allows you to do so much. But... the bigger the project and the bigger the names that you're working with, the more you have to ignore it. If you get to the soundstage and you're thinking, 'Oh my God, what a full-circle moment! Nathan Lane did it originally! Beyoncé's in this!' then you're paralyzed creatively. You just have to put that out of your head in order to get the job done."

In July 2020, Eichner announced that he and Tom McNulty were developing a film biography of fellow Northwestern University alum Paul Lynde called Man in the Box, with Eichner portraying Lynde.

In March 2021, Eichner announced that he was writing and starring in the film Bros, which tells the story of two gay men with commitment issues who decide to settle down with each other. In August, Amazon Studios announced that they had bought the rights to develop the film Ex-Husbands, starring Eichner and co-written by him and Paul Rudnick. Bros was critically well-received but a box-office disappointment, which Eichner attributed to "straight people, especially in certain parts of the country" not going to see the film.

In 2024, Eichner reprised his role as the voice of Timon in Mufasa: The Lion King.

== Personal life ==
Eichner is Jewish and gay. He lives in Los Angeles.

Eichner is a Democrat. On February 1, 2018, Eichner announced a new initiative called Glam Up the Midterms, during that night's episode of Jimmy Kimmel Live!, in conjunction with Funny or Die and with the support of several late night hosts including Sarah Silverman, James Corden, Seth Meyers, Jimmy Kimmel, Conan O'Brien, John Oliver, Chelsea Handler, Robin Thede, and Andy Cohen. Glam Up the Midterm's purpose was getting people to vote in the November 6 midterms, especially millennials, of whom only 12% voted in the previous midterm election. Eichner joined the progressive political organization Swing Left as senior advisor starting in 2019 and endorsed Elizabeth Warren in the 2020 Democratic Party presidential primaries.

== Filmography ==
=== Film ===
Year	Title	Role	Notes
2008	What Happens in Vegas	Band Leader	
2010	The Charlie Sheen Is Too Damn High	Timmy McMillan	Short film
2013	Glitter and Ribs	Taylor Swift	Short film
2014	Penguins of Madagascar	New York Reporter	Voice
2015	Sleeping With Other People	SLAA Speaker	
2016	The Angry Birds Movie	Chef Pig / Phillip	Voice
2016	Neighbors 2: Sorority Rising	Oliver Studebaker	
2018	Most Likely to Murder	Speigel	
2019	The Lion King	Timon	Voice
2019	Noelle	Gabriel Kringle	
2022	Bros	Bobby Lieber	Also writer
2024	Mufasa: The Lion King	Timon	Voice
2025	Honey Don't!	Mr. Siegfried	
TBA	Judgment Day	TBA	Post-production

=== Television and web ===
Year	Title	Role	Notes
2006	Joan Rivers' Straight Talk	Himself (co-host)	Unaired Bravo pilot
2007	My Life on the Z-List: Jen's Vlog	Jen	Web series supporting Kathy Griffin: My Life on the D-List
2011–2017	Billy on the Street	Himself (host)	Also creator and executive producer
2013–2015	Parks and Recreation	Craig Middlebrooks	17 episodes
2013–2021	Bob's Burgers	Mr. Ambrose	Voice, 13 episodes
2014	The Millers	Leon	Episode: "Movin' Out (Carol's Song)"
2014	New Girl	Barry	Episode: "LAXmas"
2015	The Awesomes	The Gayfather (voice)	Episode: "The Gayfather"
2015–2017	Difficult People	Billy Epstein	28 episodes
2016	Last Week Tonight with John Oliver	Himself	Episode: "Retirement Plans and Financial Advisors"
2016	Unbreakable Kimmy Schmidt	Himself	Episode: "Kimmy Meets a Drunk Lady!"
2016	Hairspray Live!	Rob Barker	Television special
2017	Carpool Karaoke: The Series	Himself	Episode: "Billy Eichner & Metallica"
2017	American Horror Story: Cult	Harrison Wilton	6 episodes
2017	American Horror Story: Cult	Tex Watson	Episode: "Charles (Manson) in Charge"
2017–2019	Friends from College	Dr. Felix Forzenheim	13 episodes
2018	RuPaul's Drag Race	Himself	Episode: "Cher: The Unauthorized Rusical"
2018	American Horror Story: Apocalypse	Brock	3 episodes
2018	American Horror Story: Apocalypse	Mutt Nutter	3 episodes
2018	Family Guy	Himself (voice)	Episode: "Pawtucket Pete"
2018–2022	Billy on the Street	Billy	Web series
2018, 2023	The Simpsons	Billy (voice)	2 episodes
2019	Green Eggs and Ham	Walter Bigman (voice)	Episode: "Boat"
2020	Jimmy Kimmel Live!	Himself – Guest Host	2 episodes
2020	Mariah Carey's Magical Christmas Special	Elf Billy	Christmas special
2021	Impeachment: American Crime Story	Matt Drudge	3 episodes
2021	Dickinson	Walt Whitman	Episode: "This is my letter to the World"
2024	Dinner Time Live with David Chang	Himself	Episode: "Thanksgiving in 45 Minutes"
2026	Yo Gabba Gabbaland	Himself	Episode: Body
2026	The Beauty	Waylen Lemming	

== Awards and nominations ==
Year	Award	Category	Nominee(s)	Result	Refs
2013	Daytime Emmy Awards	Outstanding Game Show Host	Billy on the Street	Nominated	
2015	Primetime Emmy Awards	Outstanding Short-Format Live-Action Entertainment Program	Billy on the Street	Nominated	
2016	Webby Awards	Online Film & Video: Comedy, Individual Short or Episode	Billy on the Street	Won	
2016	Dorian Awards	Wilde Wit of the Year	Billy on the Street	Nominated	
2017	Primetime Emmy Awards	Outstanding Variety Sketch Series	Billy on the Street	Nominated	
