= Adina Porter =

American actress (born 1971)

- Born: Adina Elizabeth Porter; New York, New York, U.S
- Education: State University of New York, Purchase (BFA)
- Occupation: Actress
- Years active: 1988–present
- Spouses: David Raymond Hecht (divorced); Larry Earl Madison (widowed)
- Children: 2

Adina Elizabeth Porter is an American actress. She is best known for her roles as Lettie Mae Thornton on the HBO fantasy horror series True Blood (2008–2014), Kendra James on the HBO drama series The Newsroom (2012–2014), Indra on the CW science fiction drama series The 100 (2014–2020) and Sheriff Susan Peterkin on the Netflix teen drama series Outer Banks. She received further recognition for her roles as Sally Freeman, Lee Harris, Beverly Hope, Dinah Stevens, and Chief Burleson on the first, sixth, seventh, eighth, and tenth seasons of the FX anthology series American Horror Story (2011–present).

Porter began her acting career appearing on Off-Broadway stage, winning the Obie Award in 1996 for Venus. She made her Broadway debut in the 2001 revival of The Women. For her work in American Horror Story, she has been nominated for a Primetime Emmy Award and two Saturn Awards.

== Life and career ==
Porter was born and raised in New York City, New York. She graduated from the State University of New York at Purchase. Her first acting teacher was Butterfly McQueen. She has been married twice and has two children with her second husband, Larry Earl Madison Jr.

=== Theater ===
Porter began her acting career in the theatre, appearing in off Broadway plays and in regional theatre. Her off-Broadway credits include The Debutante Ball, Jersey City, Aven' U Boys, Girl Gone, Silence, Cunning, Exile, Dancing on Moonlight and Hurricane. In 1996, she received Obie Award for Distinguished Performance by an Actress for her performance in Venus. Her Broadway debut came in 2001 with the Roundabout Theater's revival of The Women, directed by Scott Elliott, broadcast as part of PBS's Stage on Screen series, in addition, she performed in multiple productions at the New York Shakespeare Festival.

=== Television and film ===
Porter began her screen career playing guest starring roles on television dramas include Law & Order, New York Undercover, Brooklyn South, and NYPD Blue. She had a recurring role as housekeeper Gwen Walker in the NBC period drama American Dreams from 2002 to 2003. In film, she made her debut in 1992 Leopold/Loeb New Queer Cinema feature, Swoon. She went to appear in small roles in films The Peacemaker (1997), Gia (1998), Body Shots (1999), The Fluffer (2001), and The Salon (2005). In 2005, Porter played Ricky in the film adaptation of Ruben Santiago-Hudson's play Lackawanna Blues for HBO. She received Black Reel Award for Best Supporting Actress: Television Movie/Cable for her role. She went to appear ER, Prison Break, Without a Trace, House, and Law & Order: Special Victims Unit.

In 2008, Porter was cast as Lettie Mae Thornton, mother to Rutina Wesley's Tara Thorton, in the HBO drama series, True Blood. She was promoted to series regular in seventh and final season of show. In 2012, she guest starred in an episode of Grey's Anatomy. From 2012 to 2014, she also had a recurring role on the HBO series The Newsroom playing Kendra James. In 2014, she began appearing in a recurring role as Indra in the CW post-apocalyptic drama, The 100. Porter also starred in two unsold drama pilots for ABC, Doubt in 2013, and The Jury in 2016. In 2016, she played Pearly Mae during first season of WGN America period drama Underground. Later that year, Porter was cast as Lee Harris in the FX anthology series American Horror Story: Roanoke, after previously appearing as a minor character in American Horror Story: Murder House in 2011. For her performance in Roanoke, she received critical acclaim and was nominated for a Saturn Award for Best Supporting Actress on Television. She later portrayed Beverly Hope in American Horror Story: Cult where she received similar praise from critics and received a second Saturn Award nomination, as well as a Primetime Emmy Award nomination for Outstanding Supporting Actress in a Limited Series or Movie. She was later promoted to series regular for American Horror Story's eight season entitled Apocalypse, playing Dinah Stevens. In 2021 she appeared again as a main character in the tenth season of the series, Double Feature, where she played Chief Burleson. In 2020 she played as Sheriff Susan Peterkin in Outer Banks.

== Filmography ==
=== Film ===
Year	Title	Role	Notes
1992	Swoon	Stenographer	
1997	The Peacemaker	Police NYPD	
1998	Gia	Girl at Group Therapy	
1999	Body Shots	Detective Thompson	
2001	The Fluffer	Silver	
2002	Pipe Dream	Lauren Gunther	
2005	The Salon	Percy's wife	
2010	The Social Network	Gretchen's Associate	Uncredited
2011	About Sunny	Cheryl	
2017	The Last Word	Bree Wilson	
2019	Miss Virginia	Annette Johnson	
2023	Sitting in Bars with Cake	Tasha	

=== Television ===
Year	Title	Role	Notes
1990	Law & Order	Woman Neighbor	Episode: "Out of the Half-Light"
1994	Law & Order	Sheryl Decker	Episode: "Nurture"
1994	New York Undercover	Jasmine Hopkins	Episode: Pilot
1995	Law & Order	Mary Byman	Episode: "Savages"
1997	Brooklyn South	Angela Withers	Episode: "Life Under Castro"
1998	Brimstone	Rachel	Episode: "Repentance"
1999	Snoops	Angela Jackson	Episode: "The Grinch"
2000	The District	Ella's Assistant	Episode: Pilot
2000	Judging Amy	N/A	Episode: "Unnecessary Roughness"
2000	Any Day Now	Diane	Episode: "Where's the Justice in That?"
2000	City of Angels	Hazina	Episode: "Smoochas Gracias"
2001	NYPD Blue	Tisha	Episode: "Dying to Testify"
2002	Strong Medicine	Malia	Episode: "Compassionate Release"
2002	The Guardian	Assistant D. A.	Episode: "Monster"
2002	Crossing Jordan	Vicki Moran	Episode: "Prisoner Exchange"
2002–2003	American Dreams	Gwen Walker	Recurring role (seasons 1–2), 15 episodes
2003	NYPD Blue	Ifeoma Okafor	Episode: "Meet the Grandparents"
2005	ER	Mrs. Hopkins	Episode: "Back in the World"
2005	Jack & Bobby	N/A	Episode: "A Child of God"
2005	CSI: NY	Shannon Goodall	Episode: "On the Job"
2005	Prison Break	Leticia Barris	Episodes: "Allen", "Cell Test"
2005	Lackawanna Blues	Ricky	Television film
2006	Without a Trace	Harriet Lewis	Episode: "Watch Over Me"
2007	House M.D.	Claudia	Episode: "Family"
2007	Law & Order: Special Victims Unit	Janelle Odami	Episode: "Fight"
2007, 2010	Saving Grace	Tamara Cooley	Episodes: "Everything's Got a Shelf Life", "So Help You God"
2008–2014	True Blood	Lettie Mae Thornton	Main role (seasons 1, 7); recurring role (seasons 2–3); special guest role (seasons 4–6); 32 episodes
2009	Cold Case	Laticia Myers	Episode: "Jurisprudence"
2009	CSI: Crime Scene Investigation	Denise Devine	Episode: "Coup de Grace"
2009	Operating Instructions	Celia	Television film
2010	Hawthorne	Nancy Breton	Episode: "The Match"
2010	The Whole Truth	Detective Sweeney	Episode: "Cold Case"
2011	Criminal Minds: Suspect Behavior	Jeanette Rawlins	Episode: "Two of a Kind"
2011	Private Practice	Stacy	Episode: "A Step Too Far"
2011	American Horror Story: Murder House	Sally Freeman	Episode: "Murder House"
2011	Prime Suspect	Detective Kendra Cannon	Episode: "The Great Wall of Silence"
2011–2012	Ringer	Principal Caruso	Episodes: "The Poor Kids Do It Everyday", "What Are You Doing Here, Ho-Bag?"
2012	The Finder	Ms. Estelle	Episode: "Life After Death"
2012	Grey's Anatomy	Dr. Ramsey	Episode: "Remember the Time" 9x2
2012	Glee	History Teacher	Episode: "The Role You Were Born to Play"
2012	The Vampire Diaries	Nandi LaMarche	Episode: "We'll Always Have Bourbon Street"
2012–2014	The Newsroom	Kendra James	Recurring role, 23 episodes
2014–2020	The 100	Indra	Recurring role (seasons 2–7), 54 episodes
2015	Code Black	Susie	Episode: Pilot
2015	The Leftovers	G.R. Leader	Episode: "Ten Thirteen"
2016–2017	Underground	Pearly Mae	Recurring role, 7 episodes
2016	The Catch	FBI Agent Emily Clark	Episode: "The Wedding"
2016	American Horror Story: Roanoke	Lee Harris	Recurring role, 9 episodes
2017	Ray Donovan	Vicky	4 episodes
2017	American Horror Story: Cult	Beverly Hope	Recurring role, 10 episodes
2018	American Horror Story: Apocalypse	Dinah Stevens	Main role, 7 episodes
2019	The Morning Show	Sarah Graveler	3 episodes
2020	Outer Banks	Sheriff Peterkin	Recurring role, 8 episodes
2021	American Horror Story: Double Feature	Chief Burleson	Main role; 4 episodes
2022	Paper Girls	The Prioress	Main role; 6 episodes
2023	The Changeling	Lillian	Main role, 7 episodes
2023	The Power	The Voice	Main role (voiceover) 9 episodes
2024	The Perfect Couple	Enid Collins	Recurring role, 3 episodes
2025	Smoke	Brenda Cephus	Upcoming miniseries
2025	The Copenhagen Test	Marlowe	Recurring role

== Awards and nominations ==
Year	Association	Category	Nominated work	Result
2006	Black Reel Awards	Best Supporting Actress: Television Movie/Cable	Lackawanna Blues	Nominated
2017	Saturn Awards	Best Supporting Actress on Television	American Horror Story: Roanoke	Nominated
2018	Primetime Emmy Awards	Outstanding Supporting Actress in a Limited Series or Movie	American Horror Story: Cult	Nominated
2018	Saturn Awards	Best Supporting Actress on Television	American Horror Story: Cult	Nominated
