= The Last Showgirl =

2024 film by Gia Coppola

- Theatrical release poster
- Directed by: Gia Coppola
- Written by: Kate Gersten
- Based on: Body of Work by Kate Gersten
- Produced by: Robert Schwartzman; Natalie Farrey; Gia Coppola
- Starring: Pamela Anderson; Kiernan Shipka; Brenda Song; Billie Lourd; Dave Bautista; Jamie Lee Curtis
- Cinematography: Autumn Durald Arkapaw
- Edited by: Blair McClendon; Cam McLauchlin
- Music by: Andrew Wyatt
- Production companies: Utopia; Pinky Promise; High Frequency Entertainment; Digital Ignition Entertainment
- Distributed by: Roadside Attractions
- Release dates: September 6, 2024 (TIFF); December 13, 2024 (United States)
- Running time: 89 minutes
- Country: United States
- Language: English
- Budget: <$2 million
- Box office: $7.1 million

The Last Showgirl is a 2024 American drama film directed by Gia Coppola and written by Kate Gersten. It stars Pamela Anderson, Jamie Lee Curtis, Billie Lourd, Dave Bautista, Brenda Song, and Kiernan Shipka. Its plot focuses on a middle-aged Las Vegas showgirl who is faced with an uncertain future after learning that the revue she has performed in for three decades is scheduled to close. The screenplay was adapted by Gersten from her own play, Body of Work, which she based on her visits to the Jubilee! show shortly before its closure in 2016.

The film had its world premiere at the Toronto International Film Festival on September 6, 2024, and began a limited theatrical release in the United States on December 13, before expanding on January 10, 2025. It received generally positive reviews from critics, with Anderson garnering critical praise. Anderson received nominations for Best Actress at the 82nd Golden Globe Awards and the 31st SAG Awards while Curtis received nominations for Best Supporting Actress at the latter as well as at the 78th BAFTA Awards.

== Plot ==
Shelly Gardner is a 57-year-old showgirl who has performed for three decades in Le Razzle Dazzle, a classic French-style revue on the Las Vegas Strip. Her co-stars include several younger women like Mary-Anne and Jodie, who view Shelly as a mother figure. Shelly's older friend, Annette, maintains a close relationship with her, despite having been ousted from the show years prior, and now works as a cocktail waitress.

Eddie, the stage manager of the show, breaks the news that Le Razzle Dazzle is due to close in two weeks due to declining ticket sales, to be replaced by a more contemporary, neo-burlesque circus show that had already taken over their most popular nights. Shelly is crestfallen by the news, and views the replacement show as obscene and garish. Mary-Anne and Jodie begin auditioning for roles in other shows on the Las Vegas Strip, despite Shelly's objections that they are low-class and too risqué. With no means for retirement and few resources, Shelly worries for her future and livelihood.

Shelly reaches out to her semi-estranged daughter Hannah, who has lived with family friends for much of her adolescence and is now a college student in Arizona. Hannah visits Shelly at her home, but their reunion is marred by Hannah's emotional distance and Shelly's lack of knowledge about her daughter, forgetting Hannah's age and asking if she has declared a major months before her graduation. Hannah declines dinner with Shelly that night, but returns the following night and they enjoy each other's company.

Hannah secretly attends a Le Razzle Dazzle performance. Afterwards, she confronts Shelly in the dressing room, offended that her mother prioritized her career over raising her and denouncing the show's content as vulgar and frivolous. Shelly storms out and Hannah briefly meets Eddie before leaving. Jodie comes by Shelly's place, distraught because her own mother will not talk to her, but Shelly, still reeling from the confrontation with Hannah, coldly rebuffs her. At the next show, Jodie refuses to help Shelly get ready, leading her to rip part of her costume as she rushes to the stage and ultimately miss her cue, breaking down on the floor backstage.

Shelly invites Eddie to dinner, where she discusses her future and feelings of alienation as an aging woman, frustrated that Eddie can continue working for the casino as a producer of the new show while she will be left with nothing after thirty years at Le Razzle Dazzle. Through their conversation, it is revealed that Eddie is Hannah's father, a fact which neither of them has ever disclosed to Hannah. Eddie implies his disappointment about Shelly's upbringing of Hannah, while Shelly condemns Eddie for his failure to be present in Hannah's life.

Annette has her shifts cut early in favor of younger new hires. Annette later tells Shelly that she has gambled away all her money and has been living in her car for several weeks. She asks Shelly to let her live with her, and promises it will be only temporary.

Shelly auditions at a casting call also attended by Mary-Anne. The audition goes poorly, as Shelly is clearly nervous and unfamiliar with modern auditioning. The director interrupts Shelly's routine early and plainly tells her she is not a talented dancer, and only made up for it with youth and good looks when she was hired decades earlier at Le Razzle Dazzle. Shelly is shattered and humiliated, and Mary-Anne misses her own audition slot to console her and get her to leave the stage. Before driving off, Shelly berates Mary-Anne in her grief over giving up her life for this unforgiving industry, telling her she is not their mother and she does not love them.

Shelly leaves Hannah an apologetic voicemail, reconciles with Jodie and Mary-Anne and tells Eddie she is considering moving to Arizona so she can be present for Hannah's graduation, but also considering working as a cocktail waitress like Annette. At the final performance of Le Razzle Dazzle, Shelly envisions Hannah smiling at her backstage, and watching in the audience with Eddie.

== Cast ==
- Pamela Anderson as Shelly Gardner, a seasoned showgirl
- Kiernan Shipka as Jodie, a showgirl
- Brenda Song as Mary-Anne, a showgirl
- Billie Lourd as Hannah Gardner, Shelly's daughter
- Jason Schwartzman as the casting director
- Dave Bautista as Eddie, the stage manager of the revue
- Jamie Lee Curtis as Annette, Shelly's best friend, a cocktail waitress and former showgirl

== Production ==
=== Development ===
Kate Gersten adapted the screenplay from her own unproduced play Body of Work (developed at Roundabout Theatre), which she had been inspired to write in conjunction with her visits to the Jubilee! show before it closed in 2016. Coppola said that the play's structure allowed them to keep the story contained and create an intimate movie. She began collaborating with producer and cousin Robert Schwartzman in 2021, opting for a modest budget and short shoot to keep creative control: "By staying intimate, I get to keep my creative autonomy. When I came across Kate's play, it lends itself structurally to doing a movie in that way. There are not a lot of locations and a small cast, so you can be insulated."

=== Casting ===
Coppola wanted to cast Anderson as Shelly after watching her 2023 documentary Pamela, a Love Story. She sent the script to Anderson's then-agent who turned it down within the hour without letting Anderson know about it. Coppola then reached out to Anderson's son Brandon through mutual friends, passing it along to his mother, who had largely given up on acting. Anderson said: "I've been handed a lot of scripts in my life, but never a challenge like this. You don't see parts like this when you're working in your bathing suit. I was so drawn to the character, I heard her voice in my head and pictured everything. I thought, 'Oh! This is that thing people talk about when they read material and know they have to do it.'" Anderson likened the film's style and her emotional trust with Coppola to the works of John Cassavetes and Gena Rowlands. Jamie Lee Curtis agreed to star in the film when director Coppola told her Anderson was playing the lead character. Similarly to Anderson and Curtis, Coppola instantly thought of Dave Bautista for his part after recalling a conversation between the two from years prior about his desire for dramatic roles.

=== Filming ===
Principal photography took place on location in Las Vegas over the course of 18 days on a budget of under $2 million. Coppola was inspired by nonfiction views of Vegas, from documentaries to the work of the late journalist and art critic Dave Hickey, stating: "I didn't look to movies for inspiration on this project; I was looking to photography. I knew this world because of that." Coppola reunited with cinematographer Autumn Durald Arkapaw, who shot her 2013 directorial feature film debut Palo Alto as well as 2020's Mainstream. Arkapaw shot The Last Showgirl on 16mm film to capture a raw, grainy quality, using a handheld camera and custom anamorphic lenses. The scenes with Curtis were shot first as she only had four days available to film in January 2024.

The showgirl costumes worn by the cast in the film were archival pieces designed by Peter Menefee and Bob Mackie, some of which were used in the actual Jubilee! revue.

== Music ==
The film's score was written by Andrew Wyatt; the film also featured an original song "Beautiful That Way" in the end credits, performed by Miley Cyrus and written by Cyrus, Wyatt, Lykke Li. It was released as a single on December 9, 2024, and was included in the accompanying soundtrack album which released digitally on December 20, 2024, through Milan Records.

== Release ==
In May 2024, unveiling the first look for the film, Goodfellas and Utopia, the latter of which was co-founded by Coppola's cousin once removed Robert Schwartzman, announced that they would be teaming up to handle international sales on the film, which had already generated much interest among distributors, at the Marché du Film.

The Last Showgirl had its world premiere at the Toronto International Film Festival on September 6, 2024. It also made it to the main competition slate of the 72nd San Sebastián International Film Festival. On September 27, Roadside Attractions acquired North American distribution rights to the film. A few days later, it was announced that Sony Pictures Worldwide Acquisitions had acquired all remaining international distribution rights to the film, including Latin America, France, Scandinavia, Greece, Portugal, Turkey, Israel, Eastern Europe (excluding Poland), Asia, and Africa. The film was released in one theater in Los Angeles for one week beginning December 13, 2024, in order to qualify for the 97th Academy Awards, before receiving a wide release on January 10, 2025. The film's premiere scheduled for January 9 at the Chinese Theatre was canceled due to the Los Angeles wildfires.

The film was released on video on demand on February 18, 2025. It began streaming on Hulu on May 23, 2025.

== Reception ==
=== Box office ===
During its one-week run in Los Angeles in December 2024, the film earned $77,589 screening at one theater. It was the fifth best per-screen opening of the year and marked Roadside's second-highest opening per-screen average in its 20-year history. Upon its expanded theatrical release on January 10, 2025, it grossed $620,700 on its first day from 870 theaters, and went on to finish in tenth place at the box office with $1.5 million. The film's weekend was touted as a success by the industry, and was noted as outperforming Better Man, another expanding film that made just $1.1 million from 1,291 theaters. The film has grossed a worldwide total of $7 million.

=== Critical response ===
On the review aggregator website Rotten Tomatoes, 83% of 238 critics' reviews are positive. The website's consensus reads: "A wistful showcase for Pamela Anderson in a refreshingly dramatic role, The Last Showgirl pays homage to the working class of Las Vegas with a superb collection of performances." Metacritic, which uses a weighted average, assigned the film a score of 66 out of 100, based on 44 critics, indicating "generally favorable" reviews.

Writing for KTLA News in Los Angeles, critic Russell Falcon positively compared the film's themes to those of Coralie Fargeat's The Substance, opining that both films observe the prices women pay for their beauty and career. Time's Stephanie Zacharek named Anderson's performance as one of the 10 best of 2024, writing that her "take-me-as-I-am face intensifies both the vulnerability and the defiance she brings to the role."

Writing out of the film's world premiere RogerEbert.com's Marya E. Gates praised Anderson for her nuanced performance, writing, "As Shelly, Anderson is a revelation, bringing the same balance of buoyancy and pathos that Judy Holliday brought to each of her roles." Sheila O'Malley also compared Anderson to Judy Holliday, further writing, "And so 'comeback' isn't the right word at all for Anderson's performance, one of the best of the year. Her performance is an inadvertent indictment of an industry who pumped her up while simultaneously de-valuing her, barely considering her an 'actress' at all. Nobody could play Shelly the way Anderson plays it." Citing Pamela Anderson's turn as Shelly as one of the ten best performances of the year, The Boston Globe's Odie Henderson writes, "Anderson gives the kind of lived-in performance that proves the actor knew her character inside and out."

=== Accolades ===
Award	Ceremony date	Category	Recipient(s)	Result	Ref.
San Sebastián International Film Festival	September 28, 2024	Golden Seashell	The Last Showgirl	Nominated	
San Sebastián International Film Festival	September 28, 2024	Special Jury Prize	Cast of The Last Showgirl (Note: Pamela Anderson, Kiernan Shipka, Brenda Song, Billie Lourd, Dave Bautista and Jamie Lee Curtis.)	Won	
Zurich Film Festival	October 4, 2024	Golden Eye Award	Pamela Anderson	Won	
Newport Beach Film Festival	October 24, 2024	Outstanding Feature Narrative	The Last Showgirl	Won	
SCAD Savannah Film Festival	November 2, 2024	Marquee Award	Pamela Anderson	Won	
Miami Film Festival	November 3, 2024	Art of Light Acting Award	Pamela Anderson	Won	
Hollywood Music in Media Awards	November 20, 2024	Best Original Song – Independent Film	"Beautiful That Way" – Miley Cyrus, Lykke Li and Andrew Wyatt	Won	
Gotham Awards	December 2, 2024	Outstanding Lead Performance	Pamela Anderson	Nominated	
Winter IndieWire Honors	December 5, 2024	Performance Award	Pamela Anderson	Won	
Sun Valley Film Festival	December 6, 2024	Pioneer Award	Pamela Anderson and Gia Coppola	Won	
Astra Film Awards	December 8, 2024	Best Indie Feature	The Last Showgirl	Won	
San Diego Film Critics Society	December 9, 2024	Best Costume Design	Jacqueline Getty and Rainy Jacobs	Runner-up	
Las Vegas Film Critics Society	December 13, 2024	Best Song	"Beautiful That Way" – Miley Cyrus, Lykke Li and Andrew Wyatt	Won	
St. Louis Film Critics Association	December 15, 2024	Best Actress	Pamela Anderson	Nominated	
Online Association of Female Film Critics	December 23, 2024	Best Supporting Female	Jamie Lee Curtis	Nominated	
Online Association of Female Film Critics	December 23, 2024	The Rosie	The Last Showgirl	Nominated	
North Texas Film Critics Association	December 30, 2024	Best Actress	Pamela Anderson	Nominated	
Greater Western New York Film Critics Association	January 4, 2025	Lead Actress	Pamela Anderson	Nominated	
Golden Globe Awards	January 5, 2025	Best Original Song	"Beautiful That Way" – Miley Cyrus, Lykke Li and Andrew Wyatt	Nominated	
Golden Globe Awards	January 5, 2025	Best Actress in a Motion Picture – Drama	Pamela Anderson	Nominated	
Austin Film Critics Association	January 6, 2025	Best Actress	Pamela Anderson	Nominated	
Alliance of Women Film Journalists	January 7, 2025	Best Woman Director	Gia Coppola	Nominated	
Hawaii Film Critics Society	January 13, 2025	Best Song	"Beautiful That Way" – Miley Cyrus, Lykke Li and Andrew Wyatt	Nominated	
Women Film Critics Circle	January 15, 2025	Best Actress	Pamela Anderson	Runner-up	
Women Film Critics Circle	January 15, 2025	Karen Morley Award	The Last Showgirl	Won	
Chicago Indie Critics Windie Award	January 17, 2025	Best Original Song	"Beautiful That Way" – Miley Cyrus, Lykke Li and Andrew Wyatt	Nominated	
Critics Choice Awards	February 7, 2025	Best Song	"Beautiful That Way" – Miley Cyrus, Lykke Li and Andrew Wyatt	Nominated	
AARP Movies for Grownups Awards	February 8, 2025	Best Actress	Pamela Anderson	Nominated	
Society of Composers & Lyricists	February 12, 2025	Outstanding Original Song for a Dramatic or Documentary Visual Media Production	"Beautiful That Way" – Miley Cyrus, Lykke Li and Andrew Wyatt	Nominated	
Make-Up Artists and Hair Stylists Guild	February 15, 2025	Best Contemporary Hair Styling	Katy McClintock, Marc Boyle and Stephanie Hobgood	Won	
British Academy Film Awards	February 16, 2025	Best Actress in a Supporting Role	Jamie Lee Curtis	Nominated	
Screen Actors Guild Awards	February 23, 2025	Outstanding Performance by a Female Actor in a Leading Role	Pamela Anderson	Nominated	
Screen Actors Guild Awards	February 23, 2025	Outstanding Performance by a Female Actor in a Supporting Role	Jamie Lee Curtis	Nominated	
Golden Raspberry Awards	February 28, 2025	Razzie Redeemer Award	Pamela Anderson	Won	
Golden Trailer Awards	May 29, 2025	Best Teaser	The Last Showgirl: "Final Performance"	Nominated	
