= Emma Roberts =

American actress (born 1991)

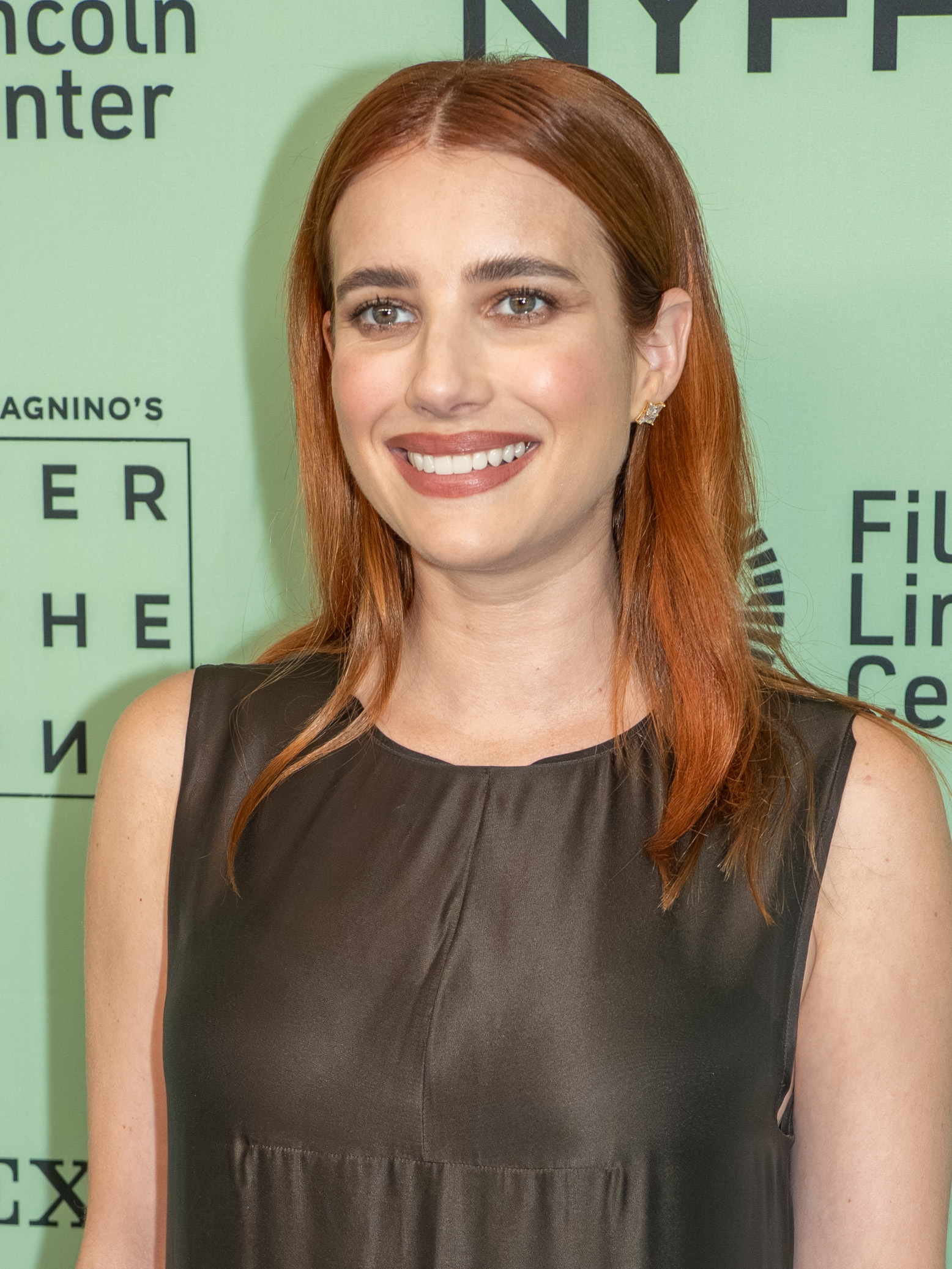
- Roberts in 2025
- Born: Emma Rose Roberts; February 10, 1991 (age 35); Rhinebeck, New York, U.S.
- Occupation: Actress
- Years active: 2001–present
- Spouse: Cody John (m. 2026)
- Partners: Evan Peters (2012–2019); Garrett Hedlund (2019–2022)
- Children: 1
- Father: Eric Roberts
- Relatives: Julia Roberts (paternal aunt); Lisa Roberts Gillan (paternal aunt); Kelly Nickels (ex-step-father); Eliza Roberts (step-mother)
- Awards: Full list

Emma Rose Roberts (born February 10, 1991) is an American actress. Known for her performances spanning multiple genres of film and television, her work in the horror and thriller genres have established her as a scream queen. Her accolades include a Young Artist Award, an MTV Movie & TV Award, and a ShoWest Award.

After making her acting debut in the crime film Blow (2001), Roberts gained recognition for her lead role as Addie Singer on the Nickelodeon television teen sitcom Unfabulous (2004–2007). For the series, she released her debut soundtrack album, Unfabulous and More, in 2005. She went on to appear in numerous films including Aquamarine (2006), Nancy Drew (2007), Wild Child (2008), Hotel for Dogs (2009), Valentine's Day (2010), It's Kind of a Funny Story (2010), and The Art of Getting By (2011).

Looking for more mature roles, Roberts had starring roles in the films Lymelife (2008), 4.3.2.1. (2010), Scream 4 (2011), Adult World (2013), We're the Millers (2013), and Gia Coppola's Palo Alto (2013). She has since appeared in The Blackcoat's Daughter (2015), Nerve (2016), Who We Are Now (2017), Paradise Hills (2019), Holidate (2020), and the Marvel superhero film Madame Web (2024). She gained further recognition for her starring roles in multiple seasons of the FX anthology horror series American Horror Story (2013–present) and for the lead role of Chanel Oberlin on the Fox comedy horror series Scream Queens (2015–2016).

== Early life ==
Emma Rose Roberts was born on February 10, 1991, in Rhinebeck, New York, to Kelly Cunningham and actor Eric Roberts. Her parents separated when she was seven months old. Through her father's marriage, she is the stepdaughter of Eliza Roberts and step-granddaughter of David Rayfiel and Lila Garrett. Through her mother's marriage, she is the former stepdaughter of musician Kelly Nickels. She has a younger maternal half-sister, Grace Nickels. Her paternal grandmother was acting coach Betty Lou Bredemus, and her aunts are actresses Julia Roberts and Lisa Roberts Gillan. During her childhood, Roberts spent time on the sets of her aunt Julia's films. These experiences sparked a desire to follow her father and aunts into the film industry. Her mother initially wanted her to have a normal childhood. She is of English, Scottish, Irish, Welsh, German, and Swedish descent through her father.

== Career ==
=== 2001–2010: Beginnings, from child star to teen ===
Roberts made her acting debut at age nine in Ted Demme's 2001 drama film Blow. It was the first film for which she auditioned. In the film, she portrayed Kristina Jung, the daughter of Johnny Depp and Penelope Cruz's characters; the older version of her character was played by Jaime King. That year, she also had a role in Leif Tilden's 10-minute short bigLove, and was an uncredited extra in some scenes featuring her aunt Julia Roberts in America's Sweethearts. Roberts went on to appear in smaller roles in two family films: in 2002's Grand Champion, as the sister of the main character Buddy (Jacob Fisher); and in 2006's Spymate, as the daughter of former secret agent Mike Muggins (Chris Potter), who tries to rescue her with the help of a spy monkey. Grand Champion had a brief theatrical release in August 2004, while Spymate was not released until February 2006, when it was given a theatrical run in Canada, followed by its DVD release in April 2006.

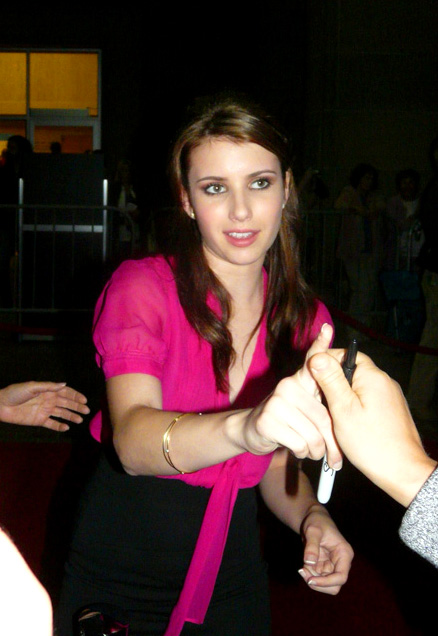
Roberts signing autographs in 2008

In 2004, she began starring as the lead character Addie Singer in the Nickelodeon sitcom Unfabulous, which debuted in September of that year. The sitcom earned Roberts several Teen Choice Award and Young Artist Award nominations. The series focused on a seventh grader, Addie, and her two best friends. It aired for three seasons (2004–2007). The show also spawned several television films, including The Perfect Moment. Also in 2004 at age 13, Roberts guest starred in an episode of the Nickelodeon series Drake & Josh titled "Honor Council". After her run on Unfabulous, Nickelodeon had considered giving Roberts a kick start into a music career. In 2005, Roberts released a debut album titled Unfabulous and More. The album was released on September 27, 2005, through Columbia Records and Nick Records. It also served as the soundtrack to the television series Unfabulous, in which Roberts starred. The album peaked at number 46 and 10 on Billboard's Heatseekers Albums and Kid Albums charts, respectively. In September 2005, two singles were released from the album: "I Wanna Be" and "Dummy". The album includes several original songs (among them "Dummy" and "I Wanna Be", both of which were also released as music videos, "I Have Arrived" and "This Is Me", which was co-written by Roberts), as well as some of Addie's songs from the first season, including "Punch Rocker" and "New Shoes" (both from the episode "The Party"), "94 Weeks (Metal Mouth Freak)" (from "The Bar Mitzvah") and "Mexican Wrestler" (which had previously appeared on Jill Sobule's 2000 album Pink Pearl and in the episode "The 66th Day" from Unfabulous).

In the same year, Roberts recorded "If I Had It My Way" for the soundtrack of the 2005 Disney film Ice Princess. In 2006, Roberts covered the song "Island in the Sun", which was originally recorded by Weezer in 2001; she recorded the song for the Aquamarine soundtrack, a film in which she starred as one of the lead actors. Also in 2006, Roberts returned to the big screen, starring alongside Sara Paxton and singer JoJo in Aquamarine. She won a 2007 Young Artist Award for Best Supporting Young Actress in a Feature Film for her role in the film. The film Aquamarine took fifth place at the box office in its opening weekend making $8 million. In early 2006, Roberts finished shooting her title role in Nancy Drew. The film was released to theaters on June 15, 2007, and grossed over $7 million in its opening weekend, though the film was not well received by critics. Roberts was set to reunite with Nancy Drew director Andrew Fleming on both Rodeo Gal and a Nancy Drew sequel in 2007, but these films were never made.

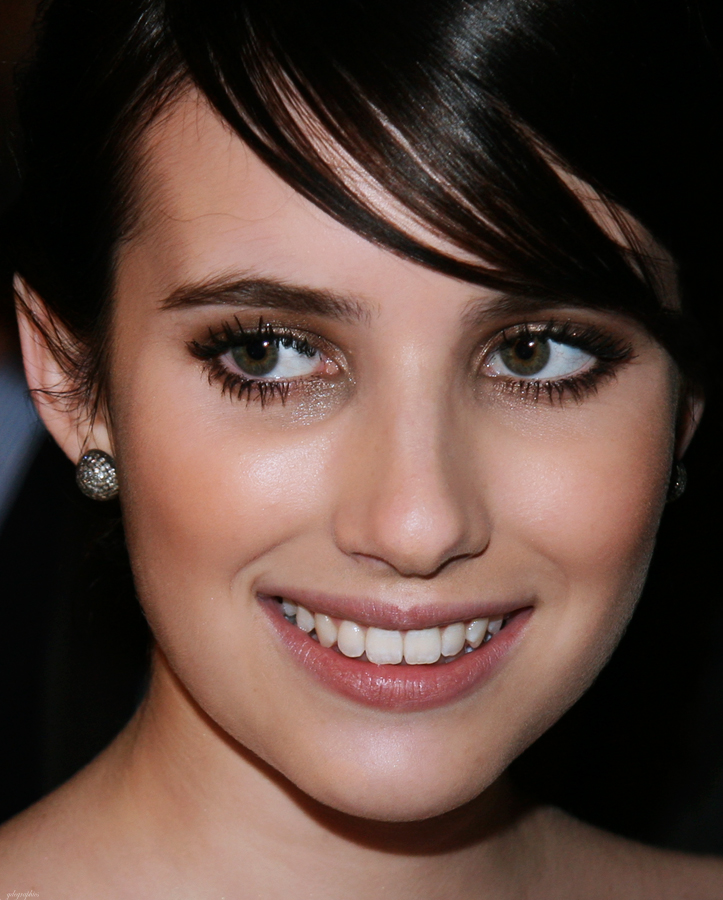
Roberts during Toronto International Film Festival, 2010

Roberts said in a 2007 interview: "Right now I am focusing on movies. I am getting ready to start a new movie this summer so that is taking a lot of my time. I think when I am a little bit older it is definitely something I'd like to pursue." In another interview, she said: "My musical career is indefinitely on hold. I don't like people who become like 'actor slash singer.' I think people should be one or the other because usually you're not going to be great at both. You're going to be better at one, so you might as well stick to the one you're good at. I'm going for acting." In 2008, Roberts starred as the lead in the film Wild Child, about a rebellious teen from Malibu, California, sent to a boarding school in England. Roberts described her character as "pretty much your typical spoiled-brat Malibu socialite who gets shipped off to a British boarding school." Roberts also appeared in two films: Lymelife, which was premiered at the 2008 Toronto International Film Festival, and The Flight Before Christmas, where she had her voiceover debut when she voiced the English version of the character Wilma. In 2009, Roberts starred alongside Jake T. Austin in Hotel for Dogs, based on the novel by Lois Duncan. The film premiered in January 2009, and took fifth place in its opening weekend with over $17 million. The film has to-date grossed over $114 million, and received generally mixed reviews from critics. She also appeared that year in The Winning Season, portraying Abbie Miller. In 2010, Roberts co-starred as Grace in the film Valentine's Day in which her aunt, Julia Roberts also appeared, although they were never together on-screen. She also appeared that year in Twelve, Memoirs of a Teenage Amnesiac, 4.3.2.1., It's Kind of a Funny Story, and Virginia.

=== 2011–2019: Mature roles and critical recognition ===
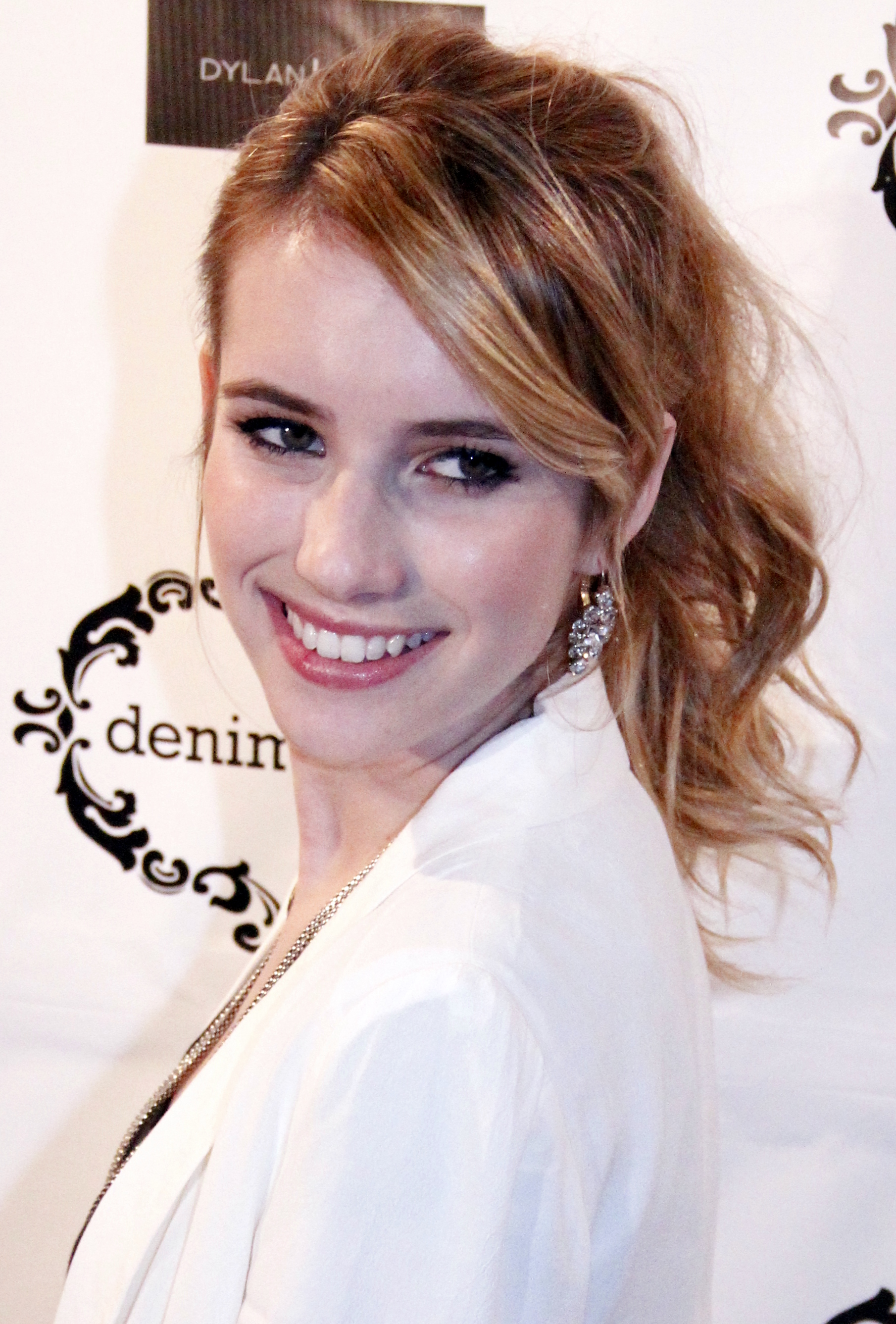
Roberts at the Denim Habit Event in NYC (October 2011)

In 2011, she starred alongside Freddie Highmore in the romantic comedy The Art of Getting By. She also played the role of Jill Roberts in the Wes Craven film Scream 4. Roberts next appeared in the 2012 film Celeste and Jesse Forever, parodying pop stars such as Kesha with her performance as Riley Banks, an incurious blonde singer. Roberts said in an interview that her role as Banks tempted her to write an album of songs using her character as an alter ego. On February 7, 2013, The Hollywood Reporter confirmed that Roberts had been cast to star in a pilot for Fox called Delirium, based on the Lauren Oliver novels. She portrayed Lena Haloway, the protagonist, but Fox decided not to pick up the show. The pilot episode was picked up by Hulu and was available to stream for a limited time beginning on June 20, 2014.

Roberts co-starred with John Cusack and Evan Peters in the comedy-drama film Adult World, released on April 18, 2013. Roberts played a recent college graduate who works at a sex shop to make ends meet. She has said that most of her lines were ad-libbed so her reactions in the film were completely genuine. Her performance was praised by both Andrew O'Hehir of Salon and Stephanie Zacharek of The Village Voice, who praised Roberts' performance as "both breezy and carefully tuned". In the next month, she guest starred as Amanda Barrington in the animated sitcom Family Guy, in the episode "No Country Club for Old Men". Roberts then starred in the comedy film We're the Millers, alongside Jennifer Aniston and Jason Sudeikis. It was released on August 3, 2013. The film received mixed reviews from critics and was a financial success, grossing over $269 million against a budget of $37 million. Roberts played the lead role in Gia Coppola's directorial debut, Palo Alto, based on James Franco's short story collection of the same name. The film was released on August 29, 2013. It received generally positive reviews, with particular praise for Roberts' performance. Tom Shone of The Guardian and Ian Freer of Empire both called her the "standout" of the film, with Freer praising her performance for being "heartbreaking as she suggests longings and anxieties without over-hyping it. Much like the film itself."

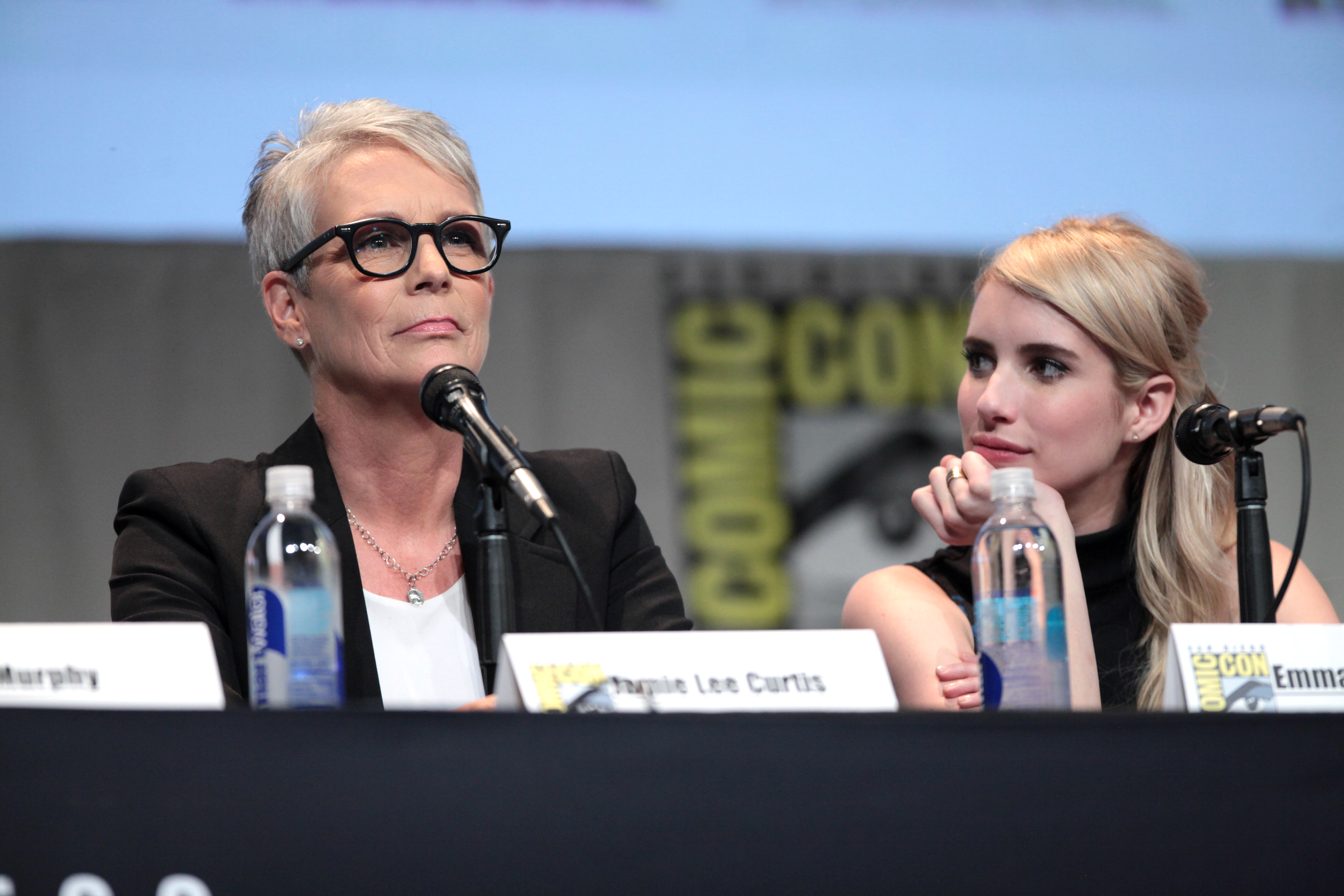
Roberts and Jamie Lee Curtis at the 2015 San Diego Comic-Con

Roberts next appeared in season three of the FX anthology horror series American Horror Story, called American Horror Story: Coven, in a main role from late 2013 through January 2014. Roberts portrayed a self-involved party girl named Madison Montgomery, who also happens to be a telekinetic witch. She then portrayed Maggie Esmerelda, a con artist posing as a fortune teller, in American Horror Story: Freak Show. In 2015, Roberts starred alongside Palo Alto co-star Nat Wolff in Ashby, portraying the supporting role of Eloise. The film had its world premiere at the Tribeca Film Festival on April 19, and was released on September 25, in a limited release and through video on demand. Roberts next appeared in the horror film The Blackcoat's Daughter (also known by its original title February) alongside Kiernan Shipka. Directed by Osgood Perkins, the film premiered at the 2015 Toronto International Film Festival. Roberts played the lead character Chanel Oberlin on Fox's comedy horror series Scream Queens, alongside Jamie Lee Curtis and Lea Michele. The series was created by American Horror Story producers Ryan Murphy and Brad Falchuk, with Glee producer Ian Brennan. The show was canceled after two seasons.

Roberts starred alongside Dave Franco in Lionsgate's adaptation of the young-adult novel Nerve. The film premiered at the SVA Theater on July 12, 2016, and grossed $85 million worldwide against its $19 million budget. In 2017, Roberts played Jess in the drama film Who We Are Now, released on September 9 at the 2017 Toronto International Film Festival. Later, Roberts returned to American Horror Story, guest starring as newscast reporter Serena Belinda, in its seventh season, Cult, in the episode "11/9". In March 2018, it was announced that Roberts was set to star in Anya's Ghost, an upcoming supernatural comedy film based on the award-winning graphic novel of the same name, written by Vera Brosgol and published in 2011. From April to August 2018, Roberts starred in three films: In a Relationship, Billionaire Boys Club, and Little Italy.

She next appeared in American Horror Story: Apocalypse, where she reprised her role of Madison Montgomery for the crossover season, returning to the main cast. On October 8, 2018, it was announced that Roberts had joined the cast of the animated musical comedy film UglyDolls, voicing the character Wedgehead. The film was released on May 3, 2019. In the same month, after reports about Roberts being cast as Kat Baker in the Netflix series Spinning Out, it was announced that she had exited the series due to scheduling conflicts. In 2019, Roberts starred in the fantasy drama film Paradise Hills, as Uma. The film had its world premiere at the Sundance Film Festival on January 26. From September through November 2019, Roberts starred in the ninth season of American Horror Story, subtitled 1984, portraying Brooke Thompson. The season has been described as being heavily influenced by classic horror slasher films such as Friday the 13th and Halloween.

=== 2019–present: More recent roles ===
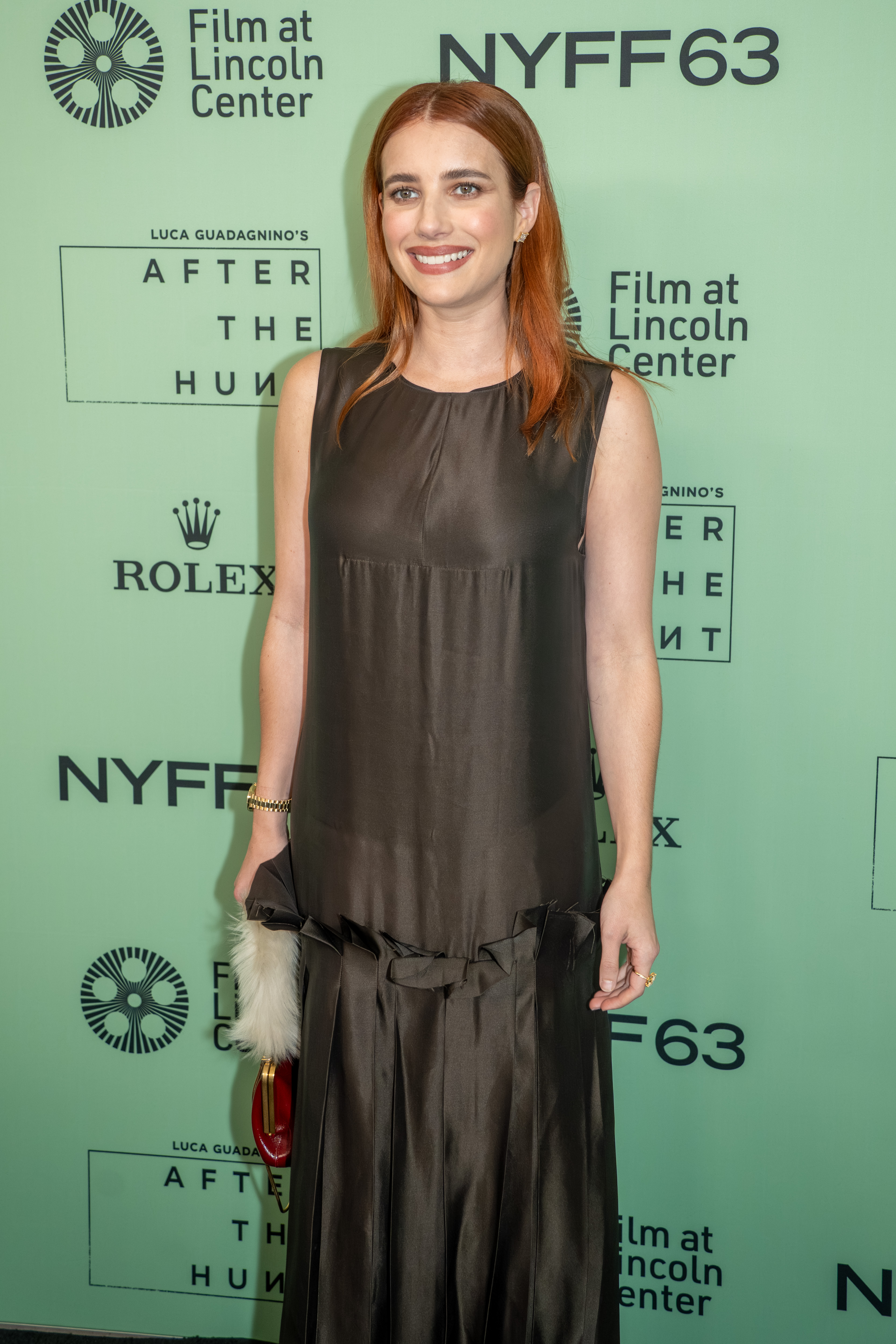
Roberts at the 63rd annual New York Film Festival at Lincoln Center in 2025 for the film After the Hunt

In March 2019, it was announced that she would star in the romantic comedy film Holidate, which was released on October 28, 2020. Roberts appeared in the controversial 2020 thriller film The Hunt. In September 2020, it was announced that she signed a first look television deal at Hulu. In April 2021, Roberts was cast to star alongside Thomas Mann and Lewis Tan in the romantic comedy About Fate, directed by Marius Balčiūnas-Weisberg. In October 2021, she was set to star in and produce the thriller film Abandoned with John Gallagher Jr. and Michael Shannon. In 2022, she was cast to star in Madame Web, an installment of Sony's Spider-Man Universe.

Roberts appeared on the March 2022 cover of Tatler, with an interview conducted at a local bookshop in The Hamptons, a locale she has visited since her mother moved there. In the interview, Roberts spoke about her interest in adapting books for film and television as she explores a production career. Additionally, in 2022, Roberts voiced the character Sasha Nutwagon in the stop motion animated film, Saurus City, which debuted at the 2025 Cannes Film Festival and its worldwide distribution rights were picked up by Archstone Entertainment.

=== Future projects ===
In 2024, Roberts was set to star in the thriller Fourth Wall, from director Alexis Ostrander and a feature script debut from Jerry Kontogiorgis. In early 2025, Roberts was cast in the comedy Old Pals, alongside Henry Winkler, Evan Rachel Wood, and Brian Cox. She is also set to star alongside Noomi Rapace, Ben Platt, and Laura Harrier among others, in the psychological thriller The Technique, an original script from Hemlock Grove author Brian McGreevy in his feature film directorial debut. In August 2025, she signed on to star in A Murder Uncorked, a rom-com murder mystery with Ari Sandel, Karen McCullah, and Vincent Newman on board as director, screenwriter, and producer respectively.

== Public image ==
In February 2009, Roberts was named the brand ambassador for Neutrogena, appearing in print and television advertisements for the company. She has appeared multiple times as part of Teen Vogue's Best Dressed list, including in June 2007, September 2008, December 2008, and February 2009.

In January 2021, Roberts paid tribute to her aunt Julia Roberts as the new ambassador of the Pretty Woman collection corresponding to the French jewelry firm Fred.

== Other work ==
=== Production ventures ===
Roberts established her production company, Belletrist TV and secured a first-look television deal with Hulu, focusing on book adaptations for television. Her debut as an executive producer came with the adaptation of Carola Lovering's Tell Me Lies, which premiered in September 2022. In 2024, Roberts produced and starred in Space Cadet, a romantic comedy film released on Prime Video. Later that year, it was announced that Roberts and her company Belletrist would team with Marci Klein to produce a series based upon Candace Bushnell's novel One Fifth Avenue, as well as re-teaming with her American Horror Story: Delicate co-star Kim Kardashian to produce the series Calabasas, based on the Via Blednar novel If You Lived Here You'd Be Famous By Now.

=== Belletrist book club ===
In 2017, Roberts, along with her friend Karah Preiss, founded the book club Belletrist. The initiative aims to foster a community where women can feel confident and empowered, with a broader goal of promoting reading. The first book featured on Belletrist was Joan Didion's South and West. Belletrist operates on a monthly schedule, where a new book is introduced each month along with some form of interaction with the author, which may vary from videos to interviews or other engaging formats.

Belletrist extends its recommendations to both established and emerging authors. Through the platform, Roberts has recommended a variety of books including Octavia E Butler's Fledgling, Lisa Taddeo's Animal, Ariel Levy's The Rules Do Not Apply, The Impossible Lives of Greta Wells by Andrew Sean Greer, Eileen Myles' Chelsea Girls and When Watched by Leopoldine Core, among others.

=== Charity ===
Roberts has been involved in various charitable endeavors and philanthropic activities, focusing on children's welfare, environmental advocacy, women's rights, and public health awareness. She actively supports the Children's Cancer Research Fund, and has been a frequent participant in fundraising events for St. Jude Children's Research Hospital. In 2017, Roberts hosted the L.A. Art Show, an event whose proceeds were donated to St. Jude's. She also attended the 2018 edition of the L.A. Art Show, among her other engagements. More recently, in November 2023, Roberts was involved in St. Jude's Giving Tuesday event, where she led a celebrity unboxing segment.

Roberts has worked with organizations like Girls Inc. to promote women's rights and empowerment. She has been involved in campaigns for gender equality and women's health. She collaborated with Free People Movement for a Thanksgiving Day 2023 campaign, focused on performing acts of kindness and assisting those in need, committing to donate all net proceeds to Girls Inc.

== Personal life ==
In September 2011, Roberts began attending Sarah Lawrence College, but by January 2012 had put her studies on hold to concentrate on work commitments.

An avid reader, she launched her book club on Instagram, titled Belletrist, in March 2017.

In June 2016, the Human Rights Campaign released a video in tribute to the victims of the Orlando nightclub shooting; in the video, Roberts and others told the stories of the people who were murdered there.

=== Ancestry ===
On a 2023 episode of Finding Your Roots featuring Julia Roberts, it was revealed that Emma Roberts' biological paternal great-great-great-grandfather's surname was actually Mitchell, not Roberts.

Emma Roberts is a distant relative of fellow actor Edward Norton.

=== Relationships ===
In 2012, Roberts began dating actor Evan Peters, whom she met on the set of the film Adult World. On July 7, 2013, the police were called to a domestic dispute at the Hotel Le St-James in Montreal, Quebec, where upon arriving and observing the bloodied nose of Peters, the officers detained Roberts but released her hours later without charging her or Peters. In a joint statement, the couple called the incident "an unfortunate incident and misunderstanding" and said they are "working together to overcome this." Throughout their relationship, they separated and reconciled multiple times. They got engaged in March 2014. Their second split reportedly happened in May 2016. After reuniting later that year, they ended their relationship for good in March 2019.

That same month, Roberts began a relationship with actor and musician Garrett Hedlund. In August 2020, it was announced that the couple was expecting a child. Roberts subsequently appeared as the first pregnant celebrity on the cover of Cosmopolitan magazine that December. Their son was born on December 27, 2020, in Los Angeles. Country singer and actor Tim McGraw is the godfather of Roberts's son. In January 2022, it was announced that Roberts and Hedlund had ended their relationship.

Roberts began dating actor Cody John in August 2022. On July 16, 2024, Roberts used Instagram to announce their engagement. Roberts and John got married on July 25, 2026, at John's family estate in Sun Valley, Idaho.

== Filmography ==
Key
†	Denotes films that have not yet been released

=== Film ===
Year	Title	Role	Notes
2001	BigLove	Delilah	Short film
2001	Blow	Kristina Sunshine Jung	
2001	America's Sweethearts	Girl in Purple T-shirt	Uncredited role
2002	Grand Champion	Sister	
2006	Spymate	Amelia Muggins	
2006	Aquamarine	Claire Brown	
2007	Nancy Drew	Nancy Drew	
2008	Wild Child	Poppy Moore	
2008	Lymelife	Adrianna Bragg	
2008	The Flight Before Christmas	Wilma (voice)	
2009	Hotel for Dogs	Andi	
2009	The Winning Season	Abbie Miller	
2010	Twelve	Molly Norton	
2010	Valentine's Day	Grace Smart	
2010	Memoirs of a Teenage Amnesiac	Alice Leeds	
2010	4.3.2.1.	Joanne	
2010	Virginia	Jessie Tipton	
2010	It's Kind of a Funny Story	Noelle	
2011	The Art of Getting By	Sally Howe	
2011	Scream 4	Jill Roberts	
2012	Celeste and Jesse Forever	Riley Banks	
2013	Adult World	Amy Anderson	
2013	Empire State	Nancy Michaelides	Direct-to-video
2013	We're the Millers	Casey Mathis / Casey Miller	
2013	Palo Alto	April May	
2015	I Am Michael	Rebekah Fuller	
2015	Ashby	Eloise	
2015	The Blackcoat's Daughter	Joan Marsh	
2016	Nerve	Venus "Vee" Delmonico	
2017	Who We Are Now	Jess	
2018	In a Relationship	Hallie	Also executive producer
2018	Billionaire Boys Club	Sydney Evans	
2018	Little Italy	Nicoletta "Nikki" Angioli	
2018	Time of Day	Herself	Short film
2019	Paradise Hills	Uma	
2019	UglyDolls	Wedgehead (voice)	
2020	The Hunt	Yoga Pants	
2020	Holidate	Sloane Benson	
2022	Abandoned	Sara Davis	Also producer
2022	About Fate	Margot Hayes	
2023	Maybe I Do	Michelle	
2024	Madame Web	Mary Parker	
2024	Space Cadet	Tiffany "Rex" Simpson	Also executive producer
2025	Saurus City	Sasha Nutwagon (voice)	
TBA	The Technique †	TBA	Post-production; also executive producer

=== Television ===
Year	Title	Role	Notes
2004–2007	Unfabulous	Addie Singer	Main role; 41 episodes
2004	Drake & Josh	Addie Singer	Episode: "Honor Council"
2006; 2012	Punk'd	Herself	2 episodes
2007	The Hills	Herself	Episode: "Young Hollywood"
2010	Jonas L.A.	Herself	Episode: "House Party"
2011	Take Two with Phineas and Ferb	Herself	Episode: "Emma Roberts"
2011	Extreme Makeover: Home Edition	Herself	Episode: "The Brown Family"
2013	Family Guy	Amanda Barrington (voice)	Episode: "No Country Club for Old Men"
2013–2014	American Horror Story: Coven	Madison Montgomery	Main role; 13 episodes
2014	Delirium	Lena Haloway	Unsold TV pilot
2014–2015	American Horror Story: Freak Show	Maggie Esmerelda	Main role; 10 episodes
2015–2016	Scream Queens	Chanel Oberlin	Lead role; 23 episodes
2017	American Horror Story: Cult	Serena Belinda	Episode: "11/9"
2018	American Horror Story: Apocalypse	Madison Montgomery	Main role; 7 episodes
2019	American Horror Story: 1984	Brooke Thompson	Main role; 9 episodes
2021	RuPaul's Drag Race All Stars	Herself	Episode: "Rumerican Horror Story: Coven Girls"
2023–2024	American Horror Story: Delicate	Anna Victoria Alcott	Main role; 8 episodes
2026	American Horror Story: 13	Madison Montgomery	Main role; 6 episodes

=== Podcast ===
Year	Title	Role
2023	Crowded Hours	Alice Roosevelt Longworth

=== Internet ===
Year	Title	Role	Notes
2017	The Postman's Diaries 2	Herself	Episode: "The Bogey"

=== Producer ===
Year	Title	Role	Notes
2011	Easy Snappin	Executive producer	Short film
2022	First Kill	Executive producer	
2022–2026	Tell Me Lies	Executive producer	

=== Music videos ===
Year	Title	Artist	Director	Ref.
2011	"Go Outside"	Cults	Isaiah Seret	
2012	"Testosterone"	Haziq and the Giggles	Petro	
2018	"Nice for What"	Drake	Karena Evans	

== Discography ==
=== Soundtrack albums ===
List of albums, with selected chart positions
Title	Album details	Peak chart position
Title	Album details	US Heat.
Unfabulous and More	Released: September 27, 2005; Formats: CD, digital download; Label: Columbia	46

=== Singles ===
List of singles
Title	Year	Album
"I Wanna Be"	2005	Unfabulous and More
"Dummy"	2005	Unfabulous and More
"Santa Claus Is Comin' to Town"	2005	Non-album single

=== Other appearances ===
Title	Year	Album	Notes
"If I Had It My Way"	2005	Ice Princess	
"Island in the Sun"	2006	Aquamarine	
"Strangely Sexy Though"	2010	4.3.2.1.	
"Do It on My Face"	2012	Celeste and Jesse Forever	
"Always & Forever"	2019	Arcadia	Co-writer only
