= Autumn Durald Arkapaw =

American cinematographer (born 1979)

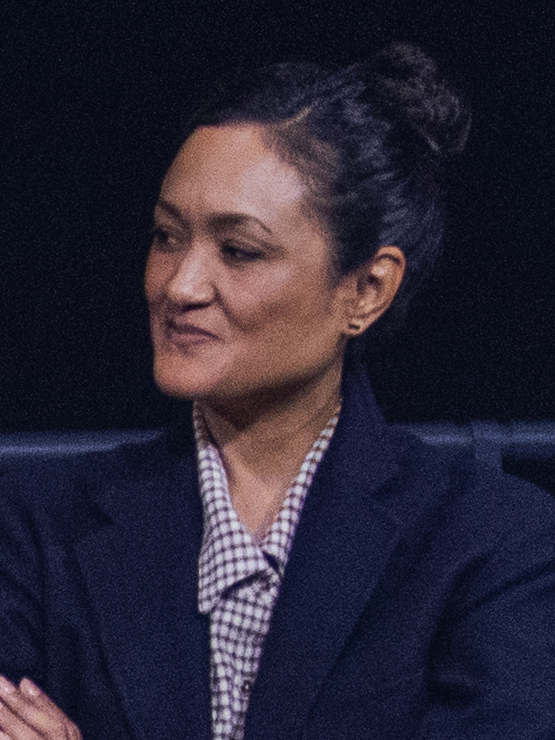
- Arkapaw in 2025
- Born: Autumn Cheyenne Durald; December 14, 1979 (age 46); Oxnard, California, U.S.
- Education: Loyola Marymount University (BA); American Film Institute Conservatory (MFA)
- Occupation: Cinematographer
- Years active: 2007–present
- Spouse: Adam Arkapaw (m. 2015)
- Children: 1
- Awards: AFI Franklin J. Schaffner Alumni Medal (2026)
- Website: autumndurald.com

Autumn Cheyenne Durald Arkapaw ASC (née Durald; born December 14, 1979) is an American cinematographer. For her work on the film Sinners (2025), she became the first woman of color to be nominated for, and the first woman and first Black person to win, an Academy Award for Best Cinematography. On television, she received a nomination at the Primetime Creative Arts Emmy Awards for Outstanding Cinematography for her work on the Loki episode "Lamentis" (2021).

== Early life and education ==
Arkapaw was born Autumn Cheyenne Durald in Oxnard, California, grew up in the San Francisco Bay Area, and is of Filipino descent on her mother's side and Black Creole on her father's side. The Filipino side of her family is Catholic. She has described her maternal grandfather, Guillermo Pagan Bautista of Pampanga, who was a resistance fighter during the Japanese occupation of the Philippines and a survivor of the Bataan Death March, "the most important man in my life" and "one of the biggest influences on my childhood and my family". She has a tattoo of her grandfather’s initials, in Baybayin script, on her wrist.

Arkapaw graduated from San Ramon Valley High School in Danville, California in 1996. She graduated in 2002 from Loyola Marymount University where she studied art history. She graduated from the AFI Conservatory's cinematography program in 2009.

== Career ==
After graduating from college, Arkapaw worked in advertising and later as a camera assistant on films. In 2019, she was invited to join the Cinematographers Branch of the Academy of Motion Picture Arts and Sciences. In 2022, she became a member of the American Society of Cinematographers.

Arkapaw shot the 2025 film Sinners on 65 mm film using a combination of IMAX 15-perf and Ultra Panavision 70 cameras, which made her the first female director of photography to shoot any movie on large format IMAX film. For her work on Sinners, she became the first woman of color (Arkapaw is of Filipino and Black Creole descent) to be nominated for the Academy Award for Best Cinematography. She won the award at the 98th Academy Awards, becoming the first woman, first black person, and first Filipina to win in the category.

Arkapaw was awarded the AFI Franklin J. Schaffner Alumni Medal at the 2026 AFI Life Achievement Award Gala.

== Personal life ==
Arkapaw married Australian cinematographer Adam Arkapaw in 2015. They have one child.

== Filmography ==
=== Film ===
Year	Title	Director	Refs.
2009	Macho	Rafael Palacio Illingworth	
2011	Guadalupe the Virgin	Victoria Giordana	
2013	Palo Alto	Gia Coppola	
2015	One & Two	Andrew Droz Palermo	
2018	Untogether	Emma Forrest	
2018	Teen Spirit	Max Minghella	
2019	The Sun Is Also a Star	Ry Russo-Young	
2020	Mainstream	Gia Coppola	
2022	Black Panther: Wakanda Forever	Ryan Coogler	
2024	The Last Showgirl	Gia Coppola	
2025	Sinners	Ryan Coogler	

=== Television ===
Year	Title	Director	Notes	Refs.
2007	On the Road in America	Jerome Gary	Episode "New York"	
2010	Portraits of Braddock	Aaron Rose	Documentary film	
2016	Untitled Sarah Silverman Project	Charlie McDowell	TV movie	
2018	Jimmy Returns, The 2018 Oscars	Paul Feig	TV short	
2019	Aziz Ansari: Right Now	Spike Jonze	Stand-up comedy	
2020	Beastie Boys Story	Spike Jonze	TV documentary	
2021	Loki	Kate Herron	Season 1	
2023	The Kick of Destiny	Mike Warzin	3 episodes	

=== Music videos ===
Year	Title	Artist	Director	Refs.
2013	"Desert Days"	Haim	Tabitha Denholm	
2013	"Falling"	Haim	Tabitha Denholm	
2013	"Strong"	London Grammar	Sam Brown	
2013	"Hearts Like Ours"	The Naked and Famous	Campbell Hooper	
2013	"Lovers in the Parking Lot"	Solange Knowles		
2013	"Primetime"	Janelle Monáe	Alan Ferguson	
2013	"Overdose"	Little Daylight	Campbell Hooper	
2014	"Ashley"	Big Sean	Ellis Bahl	
2014	"Wasted"	Tiësto	Tabitha Denholm	
2014	"You're Not Good Enough"	Blood Orange	Gia Coppola	
2015	"Porno"	Arcade Fire	Kahlil Joseph	
2019	"Sucker"	Jonas Brothers	Anthony Mandler	
2019	"Power Is Power"	SZA; The Weeknd; Travis Scott	Anthony Mandler	
2022	"Lift Me Up"	Rihanna	Herself	

== Accolades ==
=== Awards and nominations ===
Year	Award	Category	Nominated work	Result	Refs.
2022	Black Reel Awards	Outstanding Cinematography	Black Panther: Wakanda Forever	Nominated	
2022	Primetime Creative Arts Emmy Awards	Outstanding Cinematography for a Single-Camera Series (One Hour)	Loki	Nominated	
2022	Visual Effects Society Awards	Outstanding Virtual Cinematography in a CG Project	Loki	Nominated	
2025	New York Film Critics Circle Awards	Best Cinematography	Sinners	Won	
2025	National Board of Review Awards	Outstanding Achievement in Cinematography	Sinners	Won	
2026	Academy Awards	Best Cinematography	Sinners	Won	
2026	Black Reel Awards	Outstanding Cinematography	Sinners	Won	
2026	British Academy Film Awards	Best Cinematography	Sinners	Nominated	
2026	British Society of Cinematographers	Best Cinematography in a Theatrical Feature Film	Sinners	Nominated	
2026	Critics' Choice Awards	Best Cinematography	Sinners	Nominated	
2026	National Society of Film Critics	Best Cinematography	Sinners	Won	
2026	American Society of Cinematographers	Outstanding Achievement in Cinematography	Sinners	Nominated	
2026	American Film Institute	AFI Franklin J. Schaffner Alumni Medal	—N/a	Honored	

=== Listicles ===
Name of publisher, year listed, name of listicle, and placement
Publisher	Year	Listicle	Placement	Ref.
IndieWire	2014	On the Rise: Cinematographers to Watch	Included	
Variety	2014	Cinematographers to Watch	Included	
Variety	2014	Below the Line Impact Report: Up Next	Included	
