= Jack Kilmer =

American actor (born 1995)

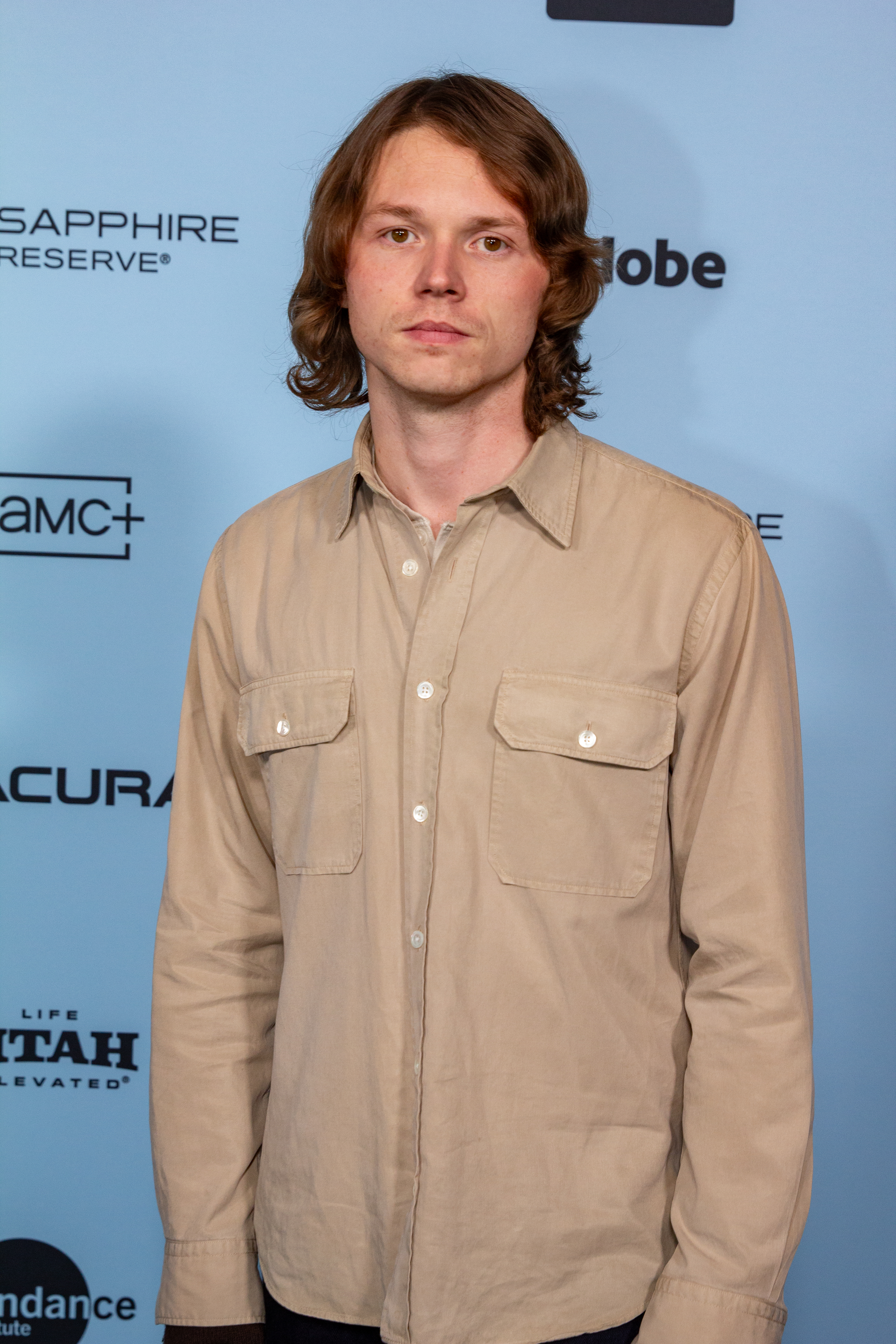
- Kilmer in 2025
- Born: John Wallace Kilmer; June 6, 1995 (age 31); Los Angeles, California, U.S.
- Citizenship: United States; United Kingdom
- Occupation: Actor
- Years active: 2013–present
- Parents: Val Kilmer (father); Joanne Whalley (mother)

John Wallace Kilmer (born June 6, 1995) is an American actor. He is known for starring in the 2013 film Palo Alto, for playing Pelle "Dead" Ohlin in the 2018 Norwegian black metal biopic Lords of Chaos, and for playing Ozzy Osbourne in Ozzy's "Under the Graveyard" video. He is also the narrator of Val, a documentary about his father, Val Kilmer.

== Early life ==
Kilmer, born on June 6, 1995, to actors Joanne Whalley and Val Kilmer, grew up in Los Angeles, California and attended primary school at The Center for Early Education, where he met would-be filmmaker Gia Coppola (he was in the first grade, she in the sixth). He has British citizenship through his mother.

== Career ==
Coppola asked him to review her script for Palo Alto, a film adaptation of James Franco's book of the same name which she also planned to direct. She asked him to advise whether the dialog was an authentic reflection of "kids today". After he ran through a table read with her, she encouraged him to audition for one of the film's main roles, Teddy. Coppola filmed him as he read through the lines and this became his audition tape; he eventually won the role. After he was cast as Teddy, his father, actor Val Kilmer, joined the cast as the father of another character. Before filming Palo Alto when he was 16 years old, Kilmer had never acted before, and did not aspire to be an actor.

The film was released in May 2014 to mostly positive reviews, and Kilmer's performance was described as "formidable", "naturalistic and sincere".

Kilmer graduated from high school in 2013. He intended for his acting job on Palo Alto to be a brief project before applying to colleges, but after the film's production he decided to join acting full-time. In April 2014, he filmed Len and Company with Juno Temple and Rhys Ifans. He played Chet, a young film projectionist who proves vital to the investigation in the 2016 neo-noir crime buddy comedy film The Nice Guys, which was written and directed by Shane Black, who had previously worked with Kilmer's father Val on the 2005 crime buddy comedy Kiss Kiss Bang Bang.

In 2014, Kilmer also dipped into the high-fashion modeling world, posing for portraits in Saint Laurent's Permanent Collection, as well as walking the runway in the brand's 2015 spring-summer show. In 2018, Kilmer starred in Jonas Åkerlund's biographical horror/thriller Lords of Chaos as Pelle "Dead" Ohlin, alongside Rory Culkin and Valter Skarsgard.

Kilmer provided extensive narration for the 2021 documentary Val, which details the life of his father. In reviewing the documentary, many critics noted the similarity in voice between Jack and Val as a young man. The film premiered on Amazon Prime on August 6, 2021, following a screening at the Cannes Film Festival. Jack was also heard in two episodes of the Disney+ series Willow, providing the voice of Madmartigan, the character played by his father in the original film.

== Personal life ==
Kilmer enjoys surfing and skateboarding. He is a musician, playing guitar and drums, and was previously in a band called Glimmer. Most recently he has served as a touring guitarist with Brion Starr and has released his first solo EP entitled "Archaic Angelic".

== Filmography ==
=== Film ===
Year	Title	Role	Notes
2013	Palo Alto	Teddy	
2015	The Stanford Prison Experiment	Jim Randall	
2015	Len and Company	Max	
2016	The Nice Guys	Chet	
2016	Asphyxia	James	Short film
2017	Woodshock	Johnny	
2018	Lords of Chaos	Pelle "Dead" Ohlin	Dead's real name was "Per Yngve Ohlin" but his nickname "Pelle" was used in the film credit.
2018	Josie	Marcus	
2018	Summer '03	Luke	
2018	Helter Skelter		Short film
2018	Pretenders	Terry	
2018	Wobble Palace	Dayton	
2019	Hala	Jesse	
2019	Butcher Boy	Ian	Short film
2019	Carte Blanche	Robert White	Short film
2019	The Follower	Jimmy Flowers	Short film
2019	The Giant	Will	
2019	Margot	One	Short film
2020	Dig	Caleb	Short film
2020	The Man in the Woods	Hobey Delmore	Short film
2021	Body Brokers	Utah	
2021	Hardcore Halbert	Halbert	Short film
2021	Val	Narrator	Documentary film
2023	Detective Knight: Independence	Dezi	
2023	Dead Man's Hand	Reno	
2023	How the Gringo Stole Christmas	Leif	
2024	Messy		
2025	Bunnylovr	Carter	

=== Television ===
Year	Title	Role	Notes
2015	The Spoils Before Dying	Tabby Smooth	3 episodes
2021	Immoral Compass	Zane	1 episode
2021	Law & Order: Organized Crime	Louis Chinasky	3 episodes
2022–2023	Willow	Madmartigan	2 episodes Voice role

=== Music videos ===
Year	Artist	Title	Notes
2019	Ozzy Osbourne	"Under the Graveyard"	as Ozzy Osbourne
