= Casey Frey =

American dancer and comedian (born 1993)

- Born: June 23, 1993 (age 33)
- Occupations: Actor, comedian, dancer
- Years active: 2016–present
- Website: caseyfreylive.com

Casey Frey (/fraɪ/; born 23 June 1993) is an American dancer and comedian notable for his videos on social media, particularly Vine.

== Early life and social media ==
Frey grew up in Mendocino County, California, where he has stated he made videos with his brother for family and friends growing up before turning to Vine, where he initially made videos of himself dancing. Frey had over 250,000 followers on Vine before the app's shutdown in January 2017. In May 2019, a video set to the song "GOMF" by Dvbbs in which Frey as "a version of himself wearing sunglasses mocks [a clone of himself] for chopping wood and dancing, [and] a third Frey donning an open button-up and a bucket hat takes notice and intervenes" went viral. The video inspired numerous subsequent remakes and parodies on TikTok in 2020.

== Dancing ==
In response to his viral video featuring the song, Dvbbs enlisted Frey to star in the music video for "GOMF", where he played a "leather-jacketed man who runs the mechanical bull ride and speaks in the goofy German accent". Frey has also appeared in the film Mainstream by Gia Coppola, and as the main performer in the music video for "The Business" by Tiësto. Frey's dancing is also featured in the music video for "Bedroom Eyes" by The Knocks.

== Personal life ==
In June 2021, Frey came out as bisexual in a podcast interview.

== Awards and nominations ==
=== Berlin Music Video Awards ===
The Berlin Music Video Awards is an international festival that promotes the art of music videos.

Year	Nominated work	Award	Result	Ref.
2026	"WE OK"	Most Trashy	Nominated	
