= BigLove =

bigLove
- Film poster
- Directed by: Leif Tilden
- Written by: Leif Tilden
- Produced by: Chris Dreyer; Jeff Gross; Scott Stewart
- Starring: Sam Rockwell; Mary McCormack; Emma Roberts; Kane Ritchotte
- Distributed by: Apollo Cinema
- Release date: January 19, 2001
- Running time: 10 minutes
- Country: United States
- Language: English

bigLove is a 2001 short film written and directed by Leif Tilden. It was first shown on January 19, 2001, at the Sundance Film Festival. It won the award for Best Short at the 2001 Flickapalooza Film Festival, and both Best Director of an HD Film and Best High-Definition Short at the 2001 HDFest.

== Plot ==
Two loving parents, Phoebe and Nate, find themselves hard pressed to emotionally deal with the fact that their kids are going off to school for the first time. However, the kids themselves, Samson and Deliah, are dealing with it in a very adult-like manner.

== Cast ==
- Sam Rockwell as Nate
- Mary McCormack as Phoebe
- Emma Roberts as Delilah
- Kane Ritchotte as Samson
- Kelly Nickels as The Bus Driver
