= List of awards and nominations received by Emma Roberts =

Emma Roberts awards and nominations
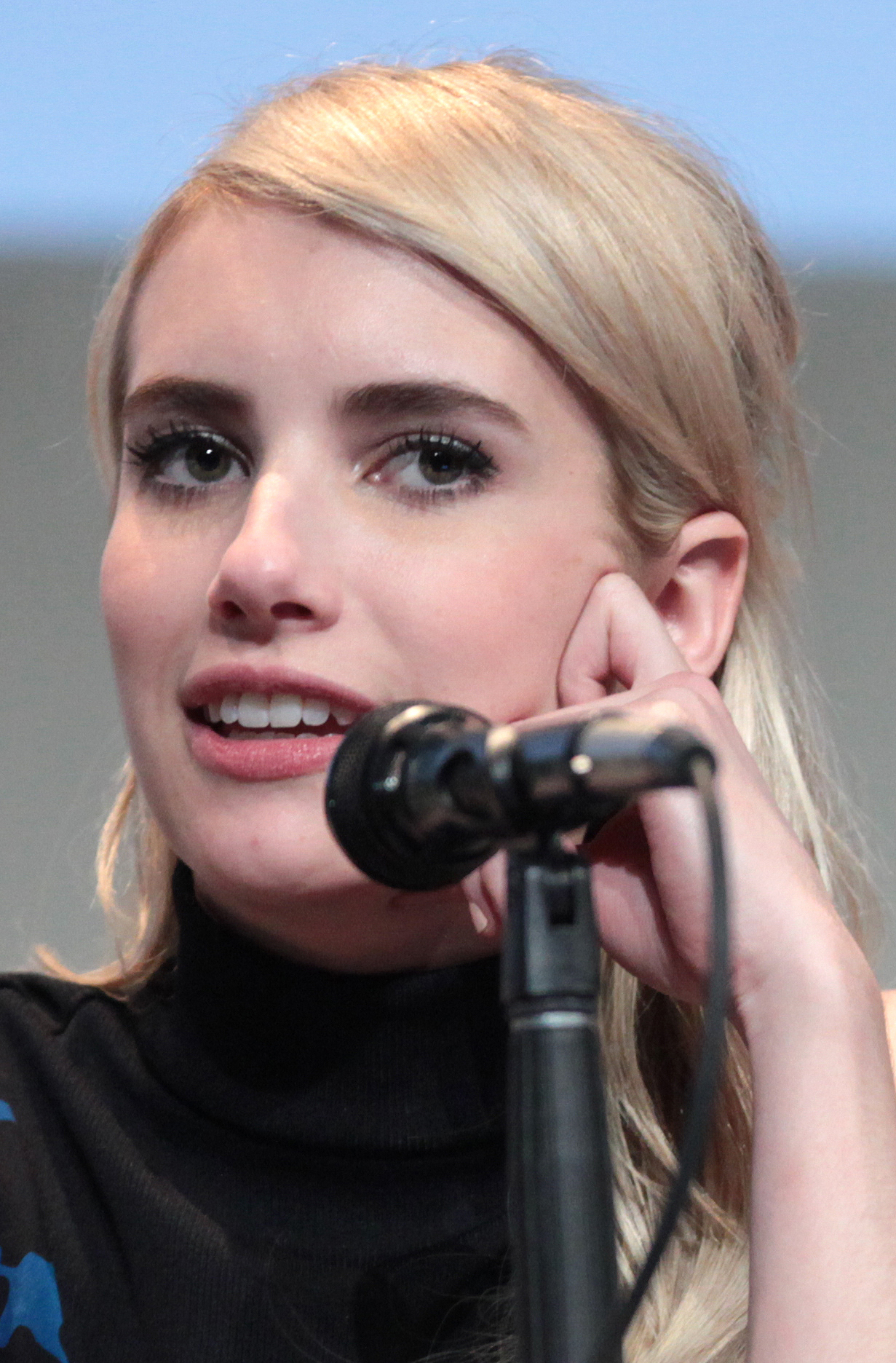
- Roberts at the 2015 San Diego Comic-Con
Totals
Award	Wins	Nominations
FilmOut San Diego LGBT Film Festival	1	0
MTV Movie Awards	1	0
Maui Film Festival	1	0
Nickelodeon Australian Kids' Choice Awards	0	3
Nickelodeon Kids' Choice Awards	0	2
Nickelodeon UK Kids' Choice Awards	0	1
People's Choice Awards	0	1
Radio Disney Music Awards	0	2
ShoWest Awards	1	0
Teen Choice Awards	1	10
Women's Image Network Awards	0	1
Young Artist Awards	1	9
Young Hollywood Awards	0	1
Wins	6
Nominations	38

The following is a list of accolades of American actress and singer Emma Roberts.

== FANDOM Awards ==
Year	Nominated work	Category	Result
2024	American Horror Story: Delicate	Best Main Protagonist	Nominated

== FilmOut San Diego LGBT Film Festival ==
=== FilmOut Festival Awards ===
Year	Nominated work	Category	Result
2015	I Am Michael	Best Actress in a Supporting Role	Won

== Golden Raspberry Awards ==
Year	Nominated work	Category	Result
2025	Madame Web	Worst Supporting Actress	Nominated

== MTV Movie Awards ==
Year	Nominated work	Category	Result
2014	We're the Millers	Best Kiss	Won (Note: Shared with Jennifer Aniston and Will Poulter)

== Maui Film Festival ==
Year	Nominated work	Category	Result
2014	Herself	Shining Star Award	Won

== Nickelodeon Australian Kids' Choice Awards ==
Year	Nominated work	Category	Result
2005	Unfabulous	Favorite Rising Star	Nominated
2007	Aquamarine	Favorite Movie Star	Nominated
2008	Nancy Drew	Favorite Movie Star	Nominated

== Nickelodeon Kids' Choice Awards ==
Year	Nominated work	Category	Result
2007	Unfabulous	Favorite TV Actress	Nominated
2008	Unfabulous	Favorite TV Actress	Nominated

== Nickelodeon UK Kids' Choice Awards ==
Year	Nominated work	Category	Result
2007	Unfabulous	Best TV Actress	Nominated

== People's Choice Awards ==
Year	Nominated work	Category	Result
2016	Scream Queens	Favorite Actress in a New TV Series	Nominated

== Radio Disney Music Awards ==
Year	Nominated work	Category	Result
2005	Herself	Best Actress Turned Singer	Nominated
2005	"Dummy" from Unfabulous	Best TV Show Song	Nominated

== ShoWest Convention ==
Year	Nominated work	Category	Result
2007	Herself	Female Star of Tomorrow	Won

== Teen Choice Awards ==
Year	Nominated work	Category	Result
2005	Unfabulous	Choice TV Breakout Performance – Female	Nominated
2007	Unfabulous	Choice TV Actress: Comedy	Nominated
2007	Nancy Drew	Choice Movie: Female Breakout	Nominated
2007	Nancy Drew	Choice Movie Actress: Comedy	Nominated
2010	Twelve	Choice Summer Movie Star: Female	Nominated
2011	The Art of Getting By	Choice Movie Actress: Romantic Comedy	Nominated
2014	We're the Millers	Choice Movie Actress: Comedy	Won
2014	We're the Millers	Choice Movie: Liplock (Note: Shared with Jennifer Aniston and Will Poulter.)	Nominated
2014	Herself	Choice Candie's Style Icon	Nominated
2016	Scream Queens	Choice TV Actress: Comedy	Nominated
2017	Scream Queens	Choice TV Actress: Comedy	Nominated

== Women's Image Network Awards ==
Year	Nominated work	Category	Result
2014	American Horror Story: Coven (Note: For "The Dead")	Actress MFT Movie/Miniseries	Nominated

== Young Artist Awards ==
Year	Nominated work	Category	Result
2005	Unfabulous	Best Performance in a TV Series (Comedy or Drama) – Leading Young Actress	Nominated
2005	Unfabulous	Outstanding Young Performers in a TV Series (Note: Shared with Jordan Calloway, Bianca Collins, Dustin Ingram, Mary Lou, Carter Jenkins, Malese Jow, Brandon Smith, and Chelsea Tavares.)	Nominated
2006	Unfabulous	Best Young Ensemble Performance in a TV Series (Comedy or Drama)	Nominated
2007	Aquamarine	Best Performance in a Feature Film – Supporting Young Actress	Won
2007	Unfabulous	Best Performance in a TV Series (Comedy or Drama) – Leading Young Actress	Nominated
2008	Unfabulous	Best Performance in a TV Series – Leading Young Actress	Nominated
2008	Unfabulous	Best Young Ensemble Performance in a TV Series	Nominated
2008	Nancy Drew	Best Performance in a Feature Film – Leading Young Actress	Nominated
2008	Nancy Drew	Best Performance in a Feature Film – Young Ensemble Cast (Note: Shared with Josh Flitter, Amy Bruckner, and Kay Panabaker.)	Nominated
2010	Hotel for Dogs	Best Performance in a Feature Film – Leading Young Actress	Nominated

== Young Hollywood Awards ==
Year	Nominated work	Category	Result
2014	Herself	Fan Favorite Actor - Female	Nominated
