= Neighbors from Hell (American Horror Story) =

- American Horror Story episode
- Episode no.: Season 7 Episode 3
- Directed by: Gwyneth Horder-Payton
- Written by: James Wong
- Production code: 7ATS03
- Original air date: September 19, 2017
- Running time: 43 minutes

Guest appearances
- Billy Eichner as Harrison Wilton; Adina Porter as Beverly Hope; Leslie Grossman as Meadow Wilton; Colton Haynes as Det. Jack Samuels; Dermot Mulroney as Bob Thompson; Laura Allen as Rosie; Ron Melendez as Mark; Seth Coltan as Pervert Guy; Cooper Dodson as Oz Mayfair-Richards; Jorge-Luis Pallo as Pedro Morales

Episode chronology
← Previous "Don't Be Afraid of the Dark"	Next → "11/9"
- American Horror Story: Cult

"Neighbors from Hell" is the third episode of the seventh season of the anthology television series American Horror Story. It aired on September 19, 2017, on the cable network FX. The episode was written by James Wong, and directed by Gwyneth Horder-Payton.

== Plot ==
Ally is wracked with guilt for killing Pedro. Kai comes to her aid and offers his protection. Harrison and Meadow berate Ally for her actions, labeling her as a racist.

A truck drives through the neighborhood dispersing an unknown chemical. The next day, dozens of dead birds are sprawled across their lawn. The drivers of the chemical truck wear masks with smiling faces. Afterwards, similar faces appear on front doors throughout the neighborhood.

Oz is gifted a guinea pig, which he names Mr. Guinea, as a so-called peace offering by Harrison and Meadow. Ally believes this to be an attempt to drive a wedge between her and Oz as she does not allow pets. Ally, Ivy, and Oz return home from dinner to discover Mr. Guinea being microwaved and subsequently exploding. Ally confronts and threatens the Wiltons. They deny their involvement.

Kai unlocks the Wiltons' dark secrets in individual interrogative sessions. Meadow feels neglected and lonely while Harrison secretly wishes she was dead. Afterwards, Meadow disappears and Harrison blames Ally.

== Reception ==
"Neighbors from Hell" was watched by 2.25 million people during its original broadcast, and gained a 1.2 ratings share among adults aged 18–49.

The episode received mostly positive reviews from critics. On the review aggregator Rotten Tomatoes, "Neighbors from Hell" holds a 73% approval rating, based on 11 reviews with an average rating of 6.75 out of 10.

Tony Sokol of Den of Geek gave the episode a 4 out of 5, comparing it to the ending of George Orwell’s Nineteen Eighty-Four. He said "The season took a subtle turn this episode. The convergent plots are beginning to make sense. The patterns that once seemed crazy, are now proven to be insane but no less credible. [...] American Horror Story: Cult presents a wonderfully twisted version of every liberal’s paranoia, which mirror those of conservatives."

Contrary to Sokol's positive review, Kat Rosenfield from Entertainment Weekly gave the episode a C+, and criticized the episode's lack of subtlety. However, she still praised the Wiltons, commenting that they are "such a joy in their own right." Vulture's Brian Moylan gave the episode a 3 out of 5, indicating a mixed review. While he enjoyed that everything was coming together in this episode, he also heavily criticized the character of Ally, calling her "the snowflake social justice warrior that Breitbart is always shouting about."

Matt Fowler of IGN gave the episode a 6.5 out of 10, with a mixed review. He said "And here, in Cult's third chapter, Ally's reactions to things, even the crazy things, are just too unbelievable. The fact that she seemingly goes nuts in exactly the way her tormentors want her to is fiercely dumb." He also criticized Eichner's and Grossman's characters, arguing they feel too cartoony and satirical. However, he praised the opening scene, saying it was "a much needed reminder that the series is also supposed to contain a few scares".
