= Palo Alto (short story collection) =

2010 book of short stories

- First edition cover
- Author: James Franco
- Language: English
- Genre: Short story
- Publisher: Scribner's
- Publication date: October 19, 2010
- Publication place: United States
- Media type: Print (hardcover, paperback)
- Pages: 224
- ISBN: 978-1439163153

Palo Alto is a collection of linked short stories by American actor, writer, and director James Franco. The collection was published on October 19, 2010, by Scribner's. The stories are about teenagers and their experiments with vices and their struggles with their families. The book is named after his hometown of Palo Alto, California, and is dedicated to many of the writers he worked with at Brooklyn College. Inspired by some of Franco's own teenage memories, and memories written and submitted by high school students at Palo Alto Senior High School, the stories describe life in Palo Alto as experienced by a series of teenagers who spend most of their time indulging in driving drunk, using drugs and taking part in unplanned acts of violence. Each passage is told by a young narrator.

== Adaptations ==
The 2013 film adaptation of the book stars its author, James Franco, alongside Emma Roberts, Jack Kilmer, and Nat Wolff. The film is written and directed by Gia Coppola. The 2015 film Yosemite, written and directed by Gabrielle Demeestere and starring Franco, was based on two stories from this book as well. The 2015 film Memoria, written and directed by Vladimir de Fontenay and Nina Ljeti and again starring Franco, was based in part on this book and in part on Franco's 2013 book A California Childhood. The 2014 film Killing Animals, directed by Javier Bosques, Steven Huffaker, Shirley Kim-Ryu, Sarah Kruchowski, Eben Portnoy, and Andrew Wesman, was based on six of the stories from this book.

== Critical response ==
The book received mixed reviews. The Los Angeles Times called it "the work of an ambitious young man who clearly loves to read, who has a good eye for detail, but who has spent way too much time on style and virtually none on substance." The Guardian said that Franco's "foray into the literary world may be met with cynicism in some quarters, but this is a promising debut from a most unlikely source." Writing in The New York Times, reviewer and fellow author Joshua Mohr praised Franco for how, in the story "American History", he juxtaposed historical parts with a present-day social commentary that "makes you wonder how much we've actually evolved in post-bellum America."

Publishers Weekly reviewed the collection, stating, "The author fails to find anything remotely insightful to say in these 11 amazingly underwhelming stories."
