= Dead Man's Hand (2023 film) =

2023 film by Brian Skiba

- Official release poster
- Directed by: Brian Skiba
- Screenplay by: Brian Skiba; Corin Nemec
- Based on: No Rest of the Wicked: Dead Man's Hand by: Kevin Minor; Matthew Minor
- Produced by: Laurie Love; Randall Batinkoff; Louise Linton; Jim Burleson; Brian Skiba
- Starring: Stephen Dorff; Jack Kilmer; Cole Hauser
- Cinematography: Adam Biddle
- Edited by: Brian Skiba
- Music by: Steve Dorff
- Production companies: SkibaVision; Milestone Studios; Stormchaser Films
- Distributed by: Grindstone Entertainment Group
- Release date: July 7, 2023
- Country: United States
- Language: English

Dead Man's Hand is a 2023 American western film directed by Brian Skiba, from a screenplay by Skiba and Corin Nemec. It is based on the graphic novel, No Rest of the Wicked: Dead Man's Hand by Kevin Minor and Matthew Minor.

== Premise ==
Reno abandons the gunslinger lifestyle after marrying Vegas, but after being forced to defend himself and killing a bandit, he is reluctantly drawn back into his former life. The bandit's brother, the merciless Mayor Bishop, is determined to avenge his brother's death. In a brutal act of retaliation, Bishop and his private army ambush Reno and Vegas, leaving Reno gravely injured and abducting his wife. Now driven by vengeance, Reno joins forces with Marshal Roy McCutcheon to unleash his anger and swear retribution against every individual who harmed them.

== Cast ==
- Stephen Dorff as Colonel Clarence T. Bishop
- Jack Kilmer as Jean Jaques Renau a.k.a. "Reno"
- Cole Hauser as Marshal Roy McCutheon
- Camille Collard as Vegas
- Mo Brings Plenty as Mahto
- Forrie J. Smith as Alexander
- Randall Batinkoff as Sheriff Winters
- Louise Linton as Carrie
- Costas Mandylor as Lucas
- William McNamara as Johnny
- Corin Nemec as Red
- Tait Fletcher as Goliath
- Kim Delonghi as Cochet

== Production ==
Dead Man's Hand is based on the graphic novel, No Rest of the Wicked: Dead Man's Hand by Kevin Minor and Matthew Minor. Brian Skiba and Corin Nemec wrote the first draft of the screenplay in 2021 and started consulting on the film in 2022. Principal photography took place in Santa Fe, New Mexico for 23 days from October to December 2022.

== Release ==
In December 2022, the film was acquired by Grindstone Entertainment Group.

It was released on July 7, 2023 in select theaters and on video on demand platforms.
