= 11/9 (American Horror Story) =

- American Horror Story episode
- Episode no.: Season 7 Episode 4
- Directed by: Gwyneth Horder-Payton
- Written by: John J. Gray
- Production code: 7ATS04
- Original air date: September 26, 2017
- Running time: 51 minutes

Guest appearances
- Billy Eichner as Harrison Wilton; Emma Roberts as Serena Belinda; Adina Porter as Beverly Hope; Leslie Grossman as Meadow Wilton; Dermot Mulroney as Bob Thompson; James Morosini as R.J.; Chaz Bono as Gary Longstreet; T.J. Hoban as Vincenzo Ravoli; Bill Parks as Cole

Episode chronology
← Previous "Neighbors from Hell"	Next → "Holes"
- American Horror Story: Cult

"11/9" is the fourth episode of the seventh season of the anthology television series American Horror Story. It aired on September 26, 2017, on the cable network FX. The episode was written by John J. Gray, and directed by Gwyneth Horder-Payton. Adina Porter was nominated for the Primetime Emmy Award for Outstanding Supporting Actress in a Limited Series or Movie for this episode.

== Plot ==
=== November 2016 ===
At the local polling place for the election, Ivy with her wife Ally, Winter and her friends, Dr. Vincent, the Wiltons, Beverly Hope, her cameraman R.J., and Beverly's rival Serena Belinda cast their vote. Kai carries Gary, whose hand appears recently amputated, to the polling booths. After both he and Kai vote for Trump, Gary emerges from the booth and raises his freshly severed stump in exclamation.

The day after the election, Harrison, a fitness trainer at a gym, is maltreated by his boss Vincenzo "Vinny" Ravoli. He then returns home and discovers from a despondent Meadow that the bank has foreclosed on their house. The next day, Harrison's frequent client Kai consoles him after he divulges his financial dilemma. In the midst of more verbal abuse by Vinny, Harrison is urged by Kai to stand up for himself and pins Vinny under barbells, crushing his chest before killing him with a dumbbell to the head. Meadow catches Harrison and Kai dismembering Vinny's body. Harrison introduces Kai to Meadow as "someone to believe in".

=== December 2016 ===
Kai turns his attention to Beverly, who was sent to a psychiatric rehabilitation center thirty days earlier for attacking a teenager after being humiliated in her live broadcasts by male hecklers. Kai finds her slashing the tires of Bob Thompson's car, after the latter trimmed her reports in favor of Serena's. Kai outlines his plan for world domination and offers her "equal power". To convince the reporter, Kai and the Wiltons murder Serena and her cameraman Cole. Beverly confronts them at his house, but she declares her allegiance to Kai's cult afterwards as well as R.J., allowing the reporter to republish her live broadcast on Vinny's murder.

=== November 2016 ===
On Election night, Ivy handcuffs Gary in the grocery's basement with the help of Winter after he groped her during the Donald Trump and Hillary Clinton presidential rally earlier that day. Ivy's retaliation costs Gary his chance to vote in the election. Upon discovering his sister's involvement with Ivy, Kai finds Gary in the basement and offers him a hacksaw to sever his chained hand, leading to the events at the beginning of the episode.

== Reception ==
"11/9" was watched by 2.13 million people during its original broadcast, and gained a 1.1 ratings share among adults aged 18–49.

The episode has been critically acclaimed. On the review aggregator Rotten Tomatoes, "11/9" holds a 100% approval rating, based on 16 reviews with an average rating of 8.19 out of 10.

Tony Sokol of Den of Geek gave the episode a 4 out of 5, saying "The episode may not be enough to convert new fans to American Horror Story: Cult, but to those preaching to the choir, the Kool-Aid is refreshing." He particularly praised the presence and the development of Peters' Kai Anderson; but also Lourd's performance as Winter, describing her as a "master mind manipulator".

Kat Rosenfield from Entertainment Weekly gave the episode a B+, and appreciated that it was a break from the character of Ally and her "hysterical screaming breakdowns". Moreover, she praised Adina Porter and her acting skills, saying "she's the best thing to happen to this cast since we lost La Lange"." Vulture's Brian Moylan gave the episode a 4 out of 5, indicating a positive review. Like Rosenfield, he praised Adina Porter, calling her a "genius", but also the plot twist of the third act of the episode.

Matt Fowler of IGN gave the episode an 8.3 out of 10, with a positive review. He said "[this episode] revealed crucial backstory and a fun twist that could greatly alter the story going forward. It was staged nicely, separated into three acts—with the third providing a new element that helps add texture to the entire season. It was also fun to watch the "cult" of Cult actually form, and to see some of the side characters be real(ish) people outside of the facade they put on for the sake of Ally and Ivy."
