= Val (film) =

2021 American documentary film

- Promotional poster
- Directed by: Leo Scott; Ting Poo
- Written by: Val Kilmer
- Produced by: Val Kilmer; Leo Scott; Ting Poo; Andrew Fried; Dane Lillegard; Jordan Wynn; Ali Alborzi; Brad Koepenick; Tom Stratton
- Starring: Val Kilmer
- Narrated by: Jack Kilmer
- Cinematography: Val Kilmer; Tom Stratton; Leila El Hayani
- Edited by: Leo Scott; Ting Poo
- Music by: Garth Stevenson
- Production companies: A24; IAC Films; Boardwalk Pictures; Cartel Films
- Distributed by: Amazon Studios (United States and Latin America); A24 (International)
- Release dates: July 7, 2021 (Cannes); July 23, 2021 (United States); August 6, 2021 (Prime Video)
- Running time: 108 minutes
- Country: United States
- Language: English

Val is a 2021 American documentary film directed and produced by Leo Scott and Ting Poo. It follows the life and career of actor Val Kilmer. The film had its world premiere at the Cannes Film Festival on July 7, 2021, and was released in a limited release on July 23, 2021, prior to digital streaming on Prime Video on August 6, by Amazon Studios.

== Synopsis ==
The film follows the life and career of actor Val Kilmer, including footage of Kilmer shot by himself throughout his career, footage of his childhood, and home movies. The film showcases Kilmer's battle with throat cancer and gives a behind-the-scenes view of his personal life, including the childhood death of his brother Wesley, his eight-year marriage to actress Joanne Whalley, and their children Mercedes and Jack.

== Production ==
Leo Scott initially began working as an editor with Harmony Korine on his short film The Lotus Community Workshop, where he came across Val Kilmer's archive, digging through 800 hours of footage, with Ting Poo boarding the project later on. The footage, which Kilmer had shot for years, featured his growing up, attending school, auditioning, his career, and family. Previously, the footage had sat in boxes for years, and once Kilmer was diagnosed with cancer and began losing his voice, it made him want to tell his story. The film is narrated by Kilmer's own words, through his son Jack Kilmer.

In May 2021, it was announced that Amazon Studios had acquired the US and Latin American rights for Val.

== Release ==
The film had its world premiere at the Cannes Film Festival on July 7, 2021. It had a limited release in theatres on July 23, 2021, prior to digital streaming on Prime Video on August 6, 2021.

== Reception ==
On the review aggregator website Rotten Tomatoes, the film holds an approval rating of 93% based on 123 reviews, with an average rating of 7.8/10. The website's critics consensus reads, "An absorbingly reflective documentary that benefits from its subject's self-chronicling, Val offers an intimate look at a unique life and career." On Metacritic, the film has a weighted average score of 73 out of 100, based on 29 critics, indicating "generally favorable reviews".

== See also ==
- Listen to Me Marlon - 2015 doc about Academy Award-winning actor and Val's one-time co-star Marlon Brando similar in content
- Lost Soul: The Doomed Journey of Richard Stanley's Island of Dr. Moreau, 2014 documentary about the behind the scenes making of the 1996 film The Island of Dr. Moreau, in which Kilmer played the character Montgomery.
