= Len and Company =

- Theatrical release poster
- Directed by: Tim Godsall
- Written by: Tim Godsall; Katie Knight
- Produced by: Youree Henley; Rick Jarjoura
- Starring: Rhys Ifans; Juno Temple; Jack Kilmer; Keir Gilchrist; Kathryn Hahn
- Cinematography: Andre Pienaar
- Edited by: Geoff Hounsell
- Music by: Miles Hankins
- Production companies: Anonymous Content; QVF, Inc
- Distributed by: IFC Films
- Release dates: June 20, 2015 (Edinburgh Film Festival); June 10, 2016 (United States)
- Running time: 102 minutes
- Country: United States
- Language: English

Len and Company is a 2015 American independent comedy-drama film, written and directed by Tim Godsall and Katie Knight. The film stars Rhys Ifans, Juno Temple, Jack Kilmer, Keir Gilchrist, and Kathryn Hahn. It had its world premiere on June 20, 2015, at the Edinburgh Film Festival and was released on June 10, 2016 by IFC Films.

== Plot ==
A withdrawn music producer's life is disrupted when his son and his protege come to his house unannounced and unexpectedly.

== Cast ==
- Rhys Ifans as Len
- Juno Temple as Zoe
- Jack Kilmer as Max
- Keir Gilchrist as William
- Kathryn Hahn as Isabelle
- Elias Toufexis as Robert
- Tyler Hynes as Paul
- Jonathan Potts as August
- Mark O'Brien as Zach
- Peter Outerbridge as Frank Coulter
- Dale Whibley as Derek Coulter
- Chris Young as Jose
- Jenny Raven as Kelly
- Dennis Long as Craig
- Billy Morrison as Award Presenter
- Lovell Adams-Gray as Chad

== Production ==
In April 2014, Jack Kilmer and Juno Temple had been cast in the film, with Tim Godsall directing the film. In November 2014, it was revealed that Kathryn Hahn, Rhys Ifans, Keir Gilchrist had also been cast in the film. with Youree Henley, Rick Jarjoura, serving as producers, Steve Golin and Kate Buckley serving as executive producers.

== Release ==
The film had its world premiere on June 20, 2015, at the Edinburgh Film Festival. The film then had its North American premiere at the Special Presentations section of the 2015 Toronto International Film Festival. The film was released in a limited release and through video on demand on June 10, 2016.

== Critical reception ==
Len and Company received positive reviews from film critics. It holds a 70% approval rating on review aggregator website Rotten Tomatoes, based on 10 reviews, with an average rating of 6.13/10. On Metacritic, the film holds a rating of 60 out of 100, based on 7 critics, indicating "mixed or average" reviews.

Guy Lodge of Variety gave the film a positive review writing : "It’s a spiny, sometimes edgily funny turn, making few concessions to sentimentality even as the role inches toward paternal redemption. Ifans may not succeed in making auds entirely care for Len, but he’s never dull to watch."
