= Center for Early Education =

The Center for Education
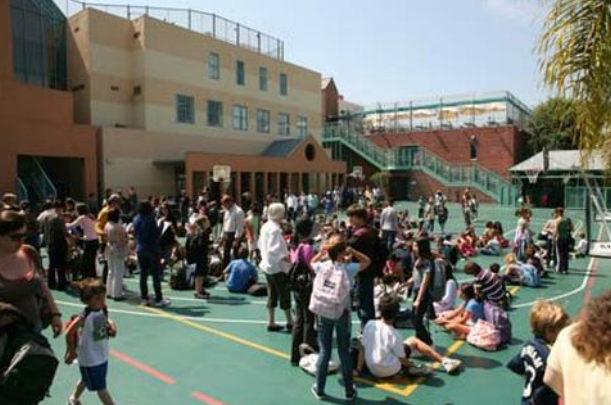
- The Center for Early Education

Location
- 563 North Alfred Street; West Hollywood, California 90048; United States; 34°4′53″N 118°22′31″W

Information
- Other name: CEE
- Type: Private
- Established: 1939
- Head of school: Damian R. Jones
- Teaching staff: 59.5 (FTE)
- Grades: Preschool – 6th Grade
- Enrollment: 540 (2024-25)
- Student to teacher ratio: 15
- Campus size: 1.34 acres (0.54 ha)
- Campus type: Urban
- Mascot: Cub
- Website: www.centerforearlyeducation.org

The Center for Early Education is a private primary school for children age two through sixth grade located in West Hollywood, Los Angeles County, California. It is considered one of the best private schools in Los Angeles.

The school holds accreditations from NAIS, CAIS, and WASC.

== History ==
The Center for Early Education was founded in 1939 by a group of professional psychoanalysts who were interested in respecting the inner world of children. Since then the school has become regarded as one of the top elementary schools in the nation. It has been noted for a high "feeder" rate into Harvard-Westlake School.

The Center also offers extensive summer camp programs for children across Los Angeles.

Damian R. Jones became the head of school in July 2022.

The school enjoys many school traditions, including a sixth-grade graduation play.

== Demographics ==
More than 50% of the student body during the 2016-17 school years was non-white. According to Town & Country magazine, "The school looks for diversity, in the hopes of a student body that represents the full spectrum of LA's varied population."

== Facilities ==
The current campus consists of three major buildings, with classrooms, a library, a community center, a gym, an innovation center, and additional indoor and outdoor instructional space. The school conducted a major campus renovation from 2016-2020, adding more classrooms and sports facilities. The first phase of the project was completed in July 2018, and the project was completed in 2020.

== 2021 data breach ==
In February 2021 the Hollywood Reporter reported that hackers leaked confidential staff salaries and parent contact information of the school in emails with racist, sexist and homophobic language.

== Alumni ==
- Jake Gyllenhaal
- Maggie Gyllenhaal
- Jonah Hill
- Jack Kilmer
