= Leif Tilden =

American actor

- Born: David Leif Tilden
- Occupations: Actor; puppeteer; director; writer
- Years active: 1990–present

David Leif Tilden, known as Leif Tilden, is an American actor, puppeteer, director and writer. He was the costume actor for Donatello in Teenage Mutant Ninja Turtles and its sequel as well as playing Robbie Sinclair and Richfield in the sitcom Dinosaurs, and gorillas in various films, including Born to Be Wild, George of the Jungle, Ace Ventura: When Nature Calls, and Buddy.

Tilden wrote and directed the 2001 short bigLove (an official entry of the 2001 Sundance Film Festival, and co-directed the 2001 Dogme film Reunion. He was the director of 2017's 1 Mile to You AKA 'Life at These Speeds, 'Heart of a Lion'.
