= Palo Alto (2013 film) =

Film by Gia Coppola

- Theatrical release poster
- Directed by: Gia Coppola
- Written by: Gia Coppola
- Based on: Palo Alto: Stories by James Franco
- Produced by: Sebastian Pardo; Adriana Rotaru; Miles Levy; Vince Jolivette
- Starring: James Franco; Emma Roberts; Jack Kilmer; Nat Wolff; Zoe Levin; Chris Messina; Keegan Allen; Val Kilmer
- Cinematography: Autumn Cheyenne Durald
- Edited by: Leo Scott
- Music by: Devonté Hynes; Robert Schwartzman
- Production companies: Rabbit Bandini Productions; American Zoetrope
- Distributed by: Tribeca Film
- Release dates: August 29, 2013 (Telluride); May 9, 2014 (United States)
- Running time: 100 minutes
- Country: United States
- Language: English
- Budget: $1 million
- Box office: $1.2 million

Palo Alto is a 2013 American coming-of-age drama film written and directed by Gia Coppola, based on the 2010 short story collection by James Franco. The film stars Franco alongside Emma Roberts, Jack Kilmer, Nat Wolff, Zoe Levin, Chris Messina, Keegan Allen, and Val Kilmer, and features Margaret Qualley in her film debut. It concerns a group of disaffected teenagers in a California suburb dealing with lust, boredom, and self-destruction. The film premiered at the Telluride Film Festival on August 29, 2013, and received a limited theatrical release in the United States on May 9, 2014, by Tribeca Film.

== Plot ==
In the Northern California city of Palo Alto, best friends Teddy and Fred are teenage stoners. Teddy is artistically inclined, but Fred constantly gets the pair into trouble with his reckless behavior. Emily has a reputation as the promiscuous girl. April is a shy student who is made fun of by her classmates for still being a virgin, and is also teased by her soccer teammates because of their coach Mr. B.'s favoritism of her. At soccer practice, Mr. B., who is a divorced father, asks April to babysit his son Michael again because he is going on a date. In return, he offers her the striker position.

Teddy and April have unspoken feelings for each other. At a party, they drink alcohol with everyone and get jealous seeing each other flirt with and kiss other people. Teddy and Emily go to a room and they share a kiss, which leads to her performing oral sex on him. Then, Teddy and Fred get into a car crash after leaving the party. A police officer pulls Teddy over and arrests him for driving under the influence. Instead of serving any jail time, he is placed on probation and ordered to perform community service at a children's library.

While Teddy is doing his community service, Fred visits him and draws a penis in a children's book; Teddy later gets in trouble for both this and carving April's name into a bench. When Teddy goes to Fred's house to talk to him, Fred's father Mitch, also a stoner, makes Teddy uncomfortable by hitting on him. Teddy is later moved to a nursing home for his volunteer work, and he bonds with seniors over the portraits he draws of them.

Meanwhile, Fred sets his sights on Emily, who invites him back to her home where they have sex. Although Emily has genuine feelings for Fred, he treats her as nothing more than a hookup. In a voiceover, he admits that at a friend's house, he got her naked in a bed so multiple guys could rape her. Then, they make out and she fellates him.

Mr. B. and April grow closer, and after she misses soccer practice because of falling behind in school, he offers to help her with schoolwork. During a study session, he kisses her, but tells her he is hesitant about pursuing anything further with her because she is underage. April says she understands and kisses him back. In class, Teddy's art teacher observes Fred's art and tells him how he went down the "tunnel of death" and realized he is "not Bob" as he drove down the highway.

April expresses her frustration with Mr. B because he has lessened communication with her. He apologizes and declares he is in love with her. April dismisses him and says she needs to date boys her own age, against his protestations. One night, the soccer team has a bad game, with April missing multiple chances to score. Mr. B offers her a ride back home but takes her back to his place, which is empty because Michael is staying at his mother's. April loses her virginity to Mr. B. that night. Later, while babysitting, April learns from Michael that Mr. B employs another babysitter, her teammate Raquel. Realizing the coach's predatory nature, April breaks things off with him.

At a party, Fred begs Emily to go night swimming with him. She goes with him to a pool, but when he undresses and gets in, she declines to join him. They get into an argument, with Fred calling her derogatory names and threatening her. Emily smashes a beer bottle on his head, injuring him and shattering his bravado. Teddy and April are also at the party and find themselves reconnecting. Teddy confesses his love for April, surprising her because they do not talk often.

With his head bleeding, Fred asks Teddy to accompany him to buy weed from drug dealer Skull. During their meetup with Skull, Fred acts increasingly erratic and holds a large chef's knife. Afterwards, Fred insists on driving down a one-way street. Teddy, unnerved by his friend's behavior, asks to be let out. Fred drives down the street alone, repeating "I'm not Bob" as oncoming cars swerve out of his way. As Teddy walks home, April sends him a text message that makes him smile.

== Cast ==
- Emma Roberts as April
- James Franco as Mr. B
- Jack Kilmer as Teddy
- Nat Wolff as Fred
- Zoe Levin as Emily
- Val Kilmer as Stewart
- Keegan Allen as Archie "Skull"
- Andrew Lutheran as Ivan
- Bailey Coppola as Seth
- Margaret Qualley as Raquel
- Chris Messina as Mitch
- Claudia Levy as Shauna
- Olivia Crocicchia as Chrissy
- Micah Nelson as Michael
- Sandra Seacat as Tanya
- Talia Shire as Mrs. Ganem

== Production ==
The film adapted the stories "Jack-O", "Emily", and "April" from the 2010 short story collection Palo Alto by James Franco.

Filming began on Halloween in 2012 in the Woodland Hills neighborhood of Los Angeles and lasted 30 days.

== Release ==
Palo Alto premiered at the Telluride Film Festival on August 29, 2013. It was screened at the 70th Venice International Film Festival on September 1, 2013, at the Tribeca Film Festival on April 24, 2014, and at the San Francisco International Film Festival on May 3, 2014. In December 2013, Tribeca Film acquired North American distribution rights to the film. Palo Alto opened in theaters in New York City and Los Angeles on May 9, 2014, followed by a national release. The film was later released on video on demand on July 29, 2014.

== Reception ==
On the review aggregator website Rotten Tomatoes, the film holds an approval rating of 70% based on 129 reviews, with an average rating of 6.2/10. The website's critics consensus reads, "A promising debut for director Gia Coppola, Palo Alto compensates for its drifting plot with solid performances and beautiful cinematography." Metacritic, which uses a weighted average, assigned the film a score of 69 out of 100, based on 34 reviews, indicating "generally favorable" reviews.

Ian Freer of Empire gave the film 4 stars out of 5, calling it a "terrific, truthful, portrait of teenage lives, delivered with a naturalness and compassion of which seasoned directors can only dream." He praised the performances, particularly Emma Roberts', who he said "is the standout, heartbreaking as she suggests longings and anxieties without over-hyping it. Much like the film itself." Tom Shone of The Guardian also acclaimed Roberts as the "standout", giving the film 3 stars out of 5. He also lauded Gia Coppola's "eye for cool composition", for posing Roberts against "repetitive, bland, pastel-colored surfaces" until her "pale, luminous beauty pops." However, he felt that away from Roberts, "the film drifts and drags, and some of the image-making is rote." Other reviews critiqued the film as feeling "incomplete", with underdeveloped plots and characters.

== Soundtrack ==
The film's soundtrack was released June 3, 2014, through Domino Recording Company.

Palo Alto (Music from the Motion Picture) track listing
No.	Title	Artist(s)	Length
1.	"Palo Alto"	Devonté Hynes	2:44
2.	"Ode to Viceroy"	Mac DeMarco	3:53
3.	"Fútbol Americano"	Robert Schwartzman	1:19
4.	"Champagne Coast"	Blood Orange	4:52
5.	"5Ft7"	Tonstartssbandht	3:25
6.	"Is This Sound Okay?"	Coconut Records	3:07
7.	"Rock Star" (film version)	Nat and Alex Wolff	3:12
8.	"Senza Mamma"	Francesco Pennino	3:25
9.	"Graveyard"	Robert Schwartzman	1:17
10.	"So Bad"	Robert Schwartzman	4:16
11.	"April's Daydream"	Devonté Hynes	1:54
12.	"It's You"	Robert Schwartzman	3:32
13.	"T.M."	Jack Kilmer	1:10
14.	"You're Not Good Enough"	Blood Orange	4:21
Total length:			42:27
