= Mainstream (film) =

2020 American film by Gia Coppola

- Official poster
- Directed by: Gia Coppola
- Screenplay by: Gia Coppola; Tom Stuart
- Story by: Gia Coppola
- Produced by: Fred Berger; Andrew Garfield; Lauren Bratman; Gia Coppola; Siena Oberman; Enrico Saraiva; Jack Heller; Zac Weinstein; Alan Terpins
- Starring: Andrew Garfield; Maya Hawke; Nat Wolff; Johnny Knoxville; Jason Schwartzman; Alexa Demie; Colleen Camp
- Cinematography: Autumn Durald
- Edited by: Glen Scantlebury
- Music by: Dev Hynes
- Production companies: Automatik; American Zoetrope; Artemis Pictures; Assemble Media; Tugawood
- Distributed by: IFC Films
- Release dates: September 5, 2020 (Venice); May 7, 2021 (United States)
- Running time: 94 minutes
- Country: United States
- Language: English
- Budget: $5 million
- Box office: $40,209

Mainstream is a 2020 American comedy-drama film directed by Gia Coppola, who co-wrote the screenplay with Tom Stuart. The film stars Andrew Garfield, Maya Hawke, Nat Wolff, Johnny Knoxville and Jason Schwartzman. Set in West Hollywood, California, its plot follows struggling young filmmaker Frankie who achieves success after meeting up with Link, a strange and bold man living off the grid.

Mainstream had its world premiere at the Venice Film Festival on September 5, 2020, and was released in the United States by IFC Films on May 7, 2021. The film received generally negative reviews from critics.

== Plot ==
Frankie is a young filmmaker living in West Hollywood. Having dropped out of school to pursue her dreams of making art, she is working a thankless job bartending with her friend Jake and has no clear vision of her goals other than creating a struggling YouTube channel. One day she encounters Link, an eccentric young man working as a costumed mascot in a mall. When Frankie claims to have been filming a painting behind Link and not Link himself, Link grabs the painting and performs a rambling but passionate monologue urging passersby to pay attention to the art. Frankie records the monologue and uploads it where it quickly becomes her most popular video. Frankie later re-encounters Link by chance and befriends him. The often-manic Link claims that his parents are dead and that he is firmly anti-establishment and anti-social media.

Frankie asks Link to appear in more of her videos; he agrees, as long as she quits her dead-end job. She convinces Jake to join them as a writer. Together, the team makes a video called "No One Special" starring Link as a satire of a stereotypical loud, offensive, narcissistic social media influencer. The trio garner attention from a social media manager who persuades them that there is real money to be made from in-video product endorsements. Meanwhile, at a late-night party hosted at a graveyard, Jake privately witnesses Link arguing with someone who claims to be his brother, but does not bring it up to Frankie. Frankie and Link begin a romantic relationship and she opens up about the death of her father and her troubled relationship with her mother.

Frankie, Jake and Link launch a show called Your Phone or Your Dignity in which Link as "No One Special" takes contestants' smart phones and offers to give them a dumb phone or to return their own phone if they undergo a humiliating task. After initial success, the trio falls victim to infighting when they begin to lose views.

The tension comes to a head when Link humiliates a young woman, Isabelle, on the show by revealing that she edits a facial birthmark out of her selfies; under his pressure, she agrees to release her unedited photos for the game show prize but breaks down in tears, for which he aggressively admonishes her. Upset at what the show has become, Jake quits. Link is then invited to be on a roundtable with several other internet celebrities hosted by Ted Wick, but when he is accused by Ted of hypocrisy and confronted with the unedited footage of Link's humiliation of Isabelle, Link rants against the other participants, claims Isabelle tried to seduce him, and is thrown out for pretending to defecate onstage.

Disillusioned, Frankie visits Jake at their old workplace and tries to bring him back into the fold, but Jake refuses and reveals he has done research on Link and found out that he is a liar: he is actually a son of rich parents (who are both alive) and that he is dangerous and unstable, having once been institutionalized for burning down his school. When Jake confesses that he is in love with Frankie, she leaves and returns home in a daze. Link arrives and announces that YouTube has invited him to head a livestream event, and that he wants to do it with her, and she accepts.

While setting up for the livestream, Frankie learns that Isabelle committed suicide due to the humiliation of her appearance and Link's accusations. When Link is more concerned about his public image than her death, Frankie reveals she knows the truth about him and storms out. During the livestream, which includes a memorial for Isabelle, Link gives his condolences but then veers off-script into a manic, vulgar monologue, refusing to accept blame for her death and instead ranting against the toxicity of social media and its oppressive hold over its audience. In an attempt to go even further, Link reveals his name is actually Alex Goodrich and invites the audience to support them only if they're willing to rebel against the mainstream. As he departs the stage, the gathered crowd applauds and starts chanting his name as he turns and smiles at the camera. Frankie and Jake later reconcile at Isabelle's memorial.

== Cast ==
- Andrew Garfield as Link
- Maya Hawke as Frankie Cabot
- Nat Wolff as Jake
- Jason Schwartzman as Mark Schwartz
- Alexa Demie as Isabelle Roberts
- Johnny Knoxville as Ted Wick
- Colleen Camp as Judy
- Jacqui Getty as Lisa
- Nick Darmstaedter as Kyler
- Marshall Bell as Marty
- Juanpa Zurita as himself
- Adam Barnhart as Officer Adam
- Trevor White as Ben
- Casey Frey as Martin
- Charles Melton as himself
- Jake Paul as himself
- Patrick Starrr as himself
- Desmond Napoles as themself
- Rola as herself
- Jordan L. Jones as Bar Patron

== Production ==
In October 2018, it was announced Andrew Garfield, Maya Hawke, Nat Wolff and Jason Schwartzman had joined the cast of the film, with Gia Coppola directing from a screenplay she wrote alongside Tom Stuart. Fred Berger will serve as a producer under his Automatik banner. In May 2019, Johnny Knoxville, Chris Messina, Alexa Demie and Colleen Camp joined the cast of the film, with Coppola, Zac Weinstein, Lauren Bratman, Enrico Saraiva, Francisco Rebelo de Andrade and Jack Heller would serve as producers under their American Zoetrope, Tugawood, Assemble Media and Dynasty Pictures banners.

Principal photography began in May 2019. Production concluded on June 14, 2019.

== Release ==
The film had its world premiere at the Venice Film Festival on September 5, 2020. It was also selected to screen at the Telluride Film Festival in September 2020, prior to its cancellation due to the COVID-19 pandemic. In February 2021, IFC Films acquired U.S. distribution rights to the film and set it for a May 7, 2021, release.

== Reception ==
On review aggregator website Rotten Tomatoes, Mainstream holds an approval rating of 42% based on 36 reviews, with an average rating of 4.9/10. The site's critics consensus reads: "Mainstream makes a vain attempt to satirize viral fame, settling instead for obvious commentary that feels painfully dated." On Metacritic, the film has a weighted average score of 36 out of 100, based on eight critics, indicating "generally unfavorable reviews".
