= Gia Coppola =

American film director and screenwriter

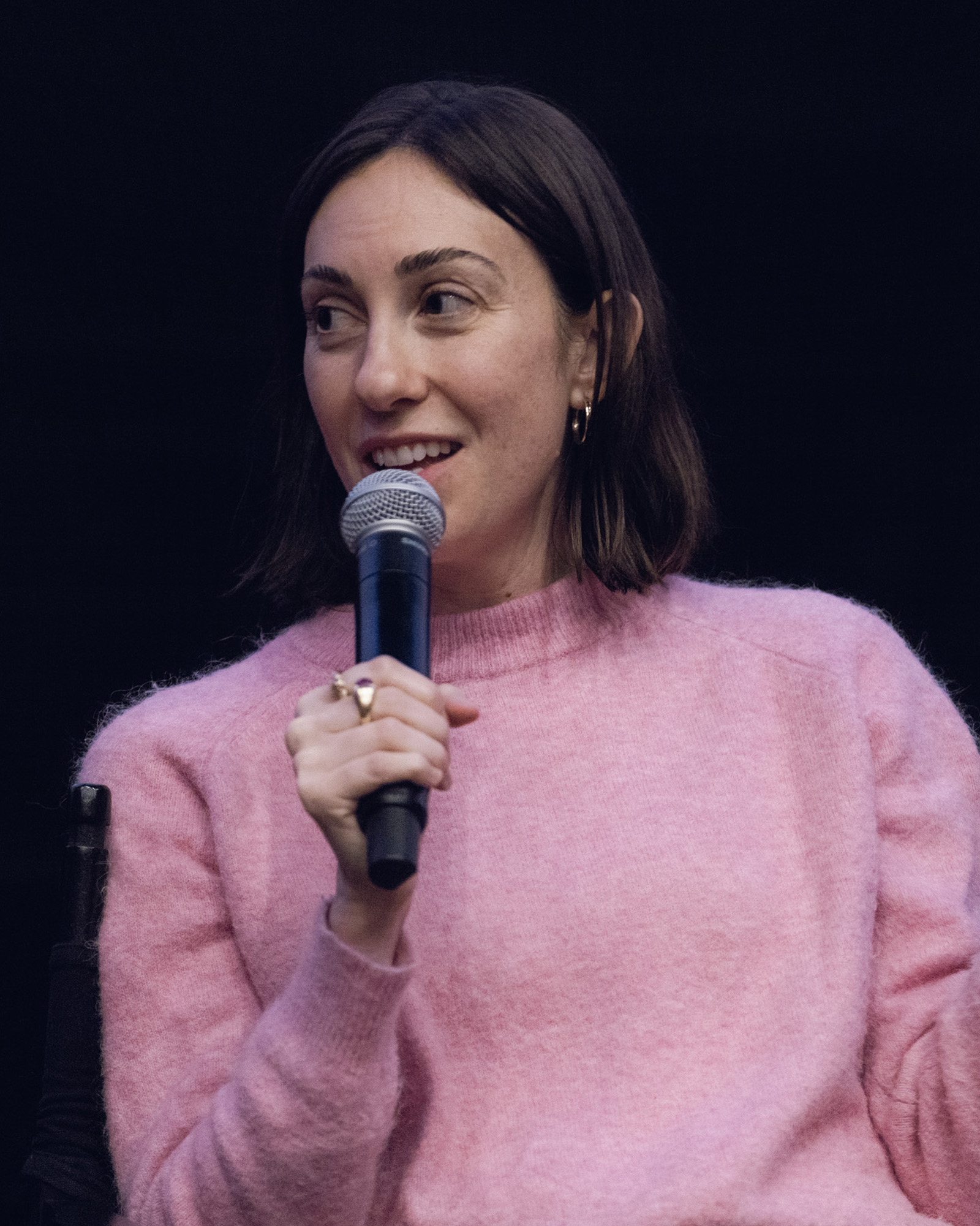
- Coppola in 2024
- Born: Gian-Carla Coppola; January 1, 1987 (age 39); Los Angeles, California, U.S.
- Occupations: Film director, screenwriter
- Years active: 2010–present
- Father: Gian-Carlo Coppola
- Relatives: Coppola family

Gian-Carla Coppola (born January 1, 1987), known professionally as Gia Coppola, is an American film director and screenwriter. A member of the Coppola family, she is the granddaughter of director Francis Ford Coppola. She made her feature film directorial debut with Palo Alto (2013), and has since directed Mainstream (2020) and The Last Showgirl (2024).

== Early life ==
Coppola is the only child of film producer Gian-Carlo Coppola and Jacqui de la Fontaine. Her father died in a speed boating incident while her mother was pregnant with her. The credits of the 1996 film, Jack, directed by her grandfather, Francis Ford Coppola, include the dedication, "For Gia - 'When you see a shooting star...'" (with her name stylized in lower case). She was close in age to the characters in the film at the time.

Peter Getty, son of Gordon Getty, became her stepfather when he married her mother in 2000. They separated in 2009. Coppola grew up in both Los Angeles, and the Coppola family vineyard, in Napa Valley. Coppola spent much of her childhood on the sets of her aunt Sofia Coppola's films. She worked as a staff assistant in the costume department in Sofia Coppola's Somewhere, and as a creative consultant in Francis Ford Coppola's Twixt.

She dropped out of high school at Archer School for Girls, and subsequently earned her GED. After attending community college, Coppola studied photography at Bard College in New York. After attending Bard College, she stated that she, "felt a little burned out on taking pictures after years of churning out so many for classes." This resulted in her turning to cinema as a medium of interest.

== Career ==
Coppola's film career began when she directed a short film for her friend's fashion label. Subsequently, Coppola was hired to make short films for Opening Ceremony which starred Kirsten Dunst and Jason Schwartzman (her cousin), Zac Posen (who said that "she's going to be the next Coppola force to be reckoned with"), Diane von Fürstenberg, Rodarte, and Elle China.

Coppola made her directorial feature film debut with Palo Alto, an adaptation of James Franco's short story collection of the same name. After befriending James Franco, Coppola was asked to adapt and direct his collection of short stories Palo Alto. She said she agreed to do the project because of how well she connected with the source material. The film premiered in the Orizzonti section of the 70th Venice International Film Festival, as well as the 38th Toronto International Film Festival and the Telluride Film Festival in Colorado. When working on the film, Coppola drew inspiration from films such as American Graffiti, Fast Times at Ridgemont High, The Outsiders, and The Virgin Suicides. Coppola collaborated with her teenage cast to write the script. Many parallels have been drawn between Coppola's debut and Sofia Coppola's The Virgin Suicides, in terms of the style and genre. In December 2013, it was announced that distributor Tribeca Film had picked up the film for distribution, and it was released theatrically on May 9, 2014. The film was released on DVD in the United States on September 9, 2014.

In May 2019, Coppola began filming Mainstream, for which she co-wrote the script with Tom Stuart. The film, starring Andrew Garfield, Maya Hawke and Jason Schwartzman, follows three lovers who struggle to preserve their identities as they form an eccentric love triangle within the modern internet age.

== Filmography ==
=== Feature film ===
Year	Title	Notes	Refs.
2013	Palo Alto		
2020	Mainstream	Also producer	
2024	The Last Showgirl	Also producer	
TBA	Perfect	Scrapped	

=== Short film ===
Year	Title	Notes	Refs.
2010	Non Plus One	Co-directed with Tracy Antonopoulos	
2012	Casino Moon	Also writer	
2013	Twixt: A Documentary	Documentary short on the making of her grandfather's film Twixt	
2015	Strange Love	Documentary short; Co-directed with Tracy Antonopoulos and Samantha Ressler	
2022	Jane 2	Segment of The Seven Faces of Jane	

=== Documentary film ===
- Superfans: Screaming. Crying. Throwing up. (TBA) (Also producer)

=== Television ===
Year	Title	Episode	Refs.
2018	Love Advent	"Nicola Peltz"	

=== Music video ===
Year	Title	Artist	Refs.
2014	"You're Not Good Enough"	Blood Orange	
2015	"Your Type"	Carly Rae Jepsen	
2017	"Cut to the Feeling"	Carly Rae Jepsen	
2019	"Applaud"	Yves Tumor	
2020	"Are You A Magician?"	Soko	
2023	”Where do we go now?”	Gracie Abrams	
2024	"Lucky"	Halsey	

=== Acting roles ===
Year	Title	Role	Notes	Refs.
1989	New York Stories	Baby Zoe	Segment "Life Without Zoe"	
1990	The Godfather Part III	Connie's Granddaughter	Uncredited	

== See also ==
- Coppola family tree
