= Mike Nguyen Le =

American film director

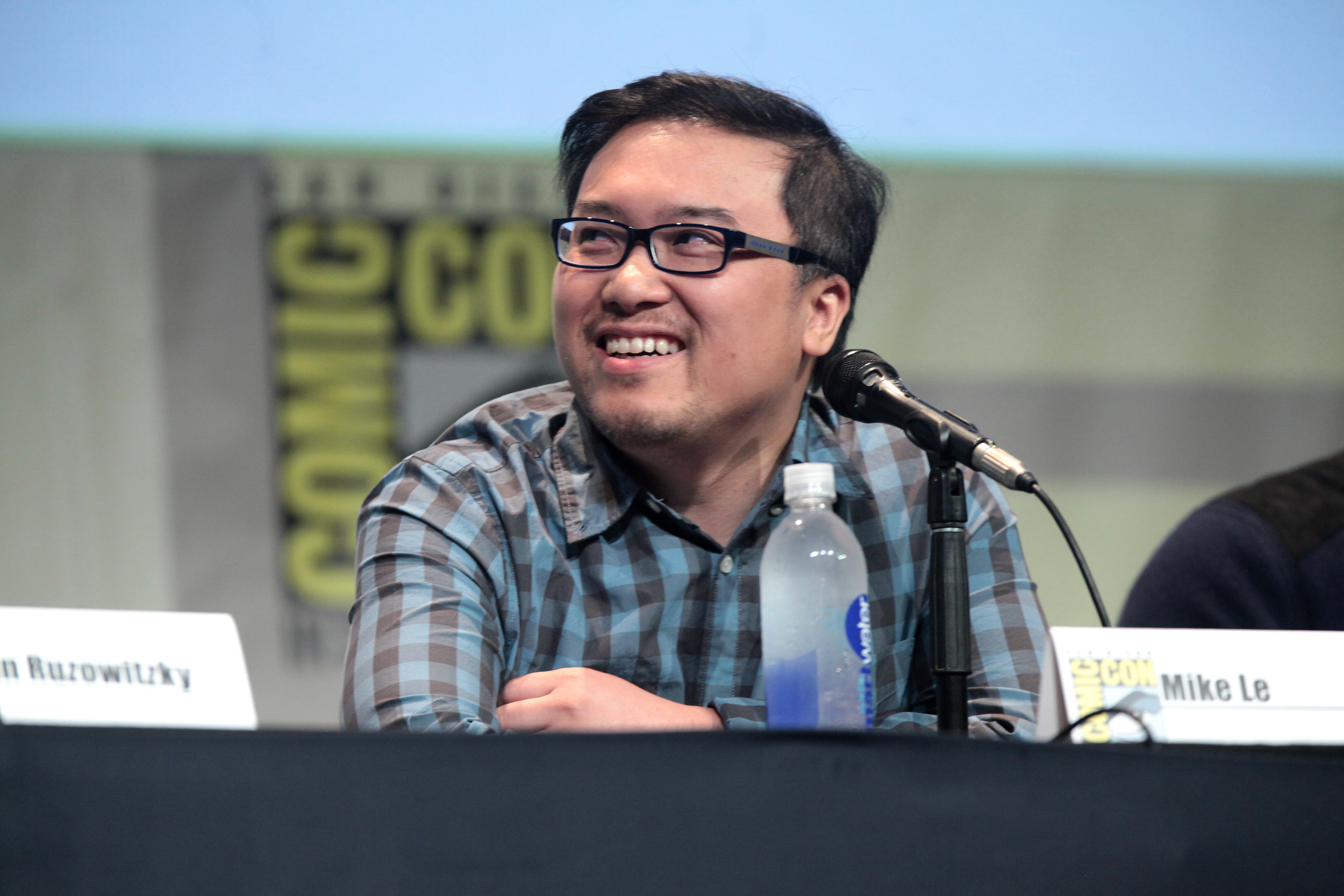
- Mike Le at SDCC 2015
- Born: Bradenton, Florida United States
- Education: State College of Florida, Manatee-Sarasota
- Occupations: Screenwriter, producer

Mike Nguyen Le (also credited as Mike Le) is a Vietnamese American screenwriter, producer, and film director.

== Screenwriting ==
Le wrote and co-executive produced the feature horror film Dark Summer (2014) directed by Paul Solet and starring Keir Gilchrist, Stella Maeve, Maestro Harrell, Grace Phipps, and Peter Stormare. The film is "a stylized modern ghost story" and "follows the tale of a 17-year-old on house arrest for the summer. When his mother is away on business, a horrifying incident occurs, followed by an even more terrifying presence in the house."

Le also wrote the 2014 film Amnesiac directed by Michael Polish and starring Kate Bosworth and Wes Bentley.

Le co-wrote the screenplay to the 2013 thriller war film W.M.D. directed by Richard Halpern and starring Tom Kiesche, John Posey, and Leila Birch.

In 2015, Variety Magazine named Le as one of their Top 10 Screenwriters To Watch. That same year, Le sold his action feature spec script Desert Eagle to Universal Pictures.

In 2017, ABC Signature hired Le to write the pilot script for Shatter Me, a TV series based on the bestselling YA novels by Tahereh Mafi.

Le wrote the screenplay for the 2018 film Patient Zero starring Matt Smith, Natalie Dormer, and Stanley Tucci.

In 2018, Le was hired to write The Mechanic 3, the third film in the action franchise starring Jason Statham.

Le co-wrote the screenplay to Universal's remake of The River Wild (1994), simply titled River Wild (2023).

Le is a writer on the second and third seasons of the series BMF.

== Directing, producing & editing ==
Le directed and executive produced over 18 episodes of the web series K-Town. Le also directed and executive produced over 8 episodes of the "spin-off" series to K-Town, a web series focusing on import car models entitled Roll Models.

Le was brought onto the second season of BMF as Supervising Producer. He was promoted to Co-Executive Producer for the show's third season.

== Comic Book Writing ==
Le co-wrote, with Robert Kirkman, creator of The Walking Dead comic book, the bestselling comic book series Mayhem! for Image Comics.
