= River Wild (disambiguation) =

River Wild is an American thriller film released in 2023.

River Wild may also refer to:

- The River Wild, an American thriller film released in 1994, which the 2023 River Wild is based on
- Open Heaven / River Wild, 2015 album by Hillsong Worship

== See also ==
- Wild river (disambiguation)
