= Heartthrob =

Heartthrob or Heart Throb may refer to:

- "Heart Throb" (The Super Mario Bros. Super Show!), a live-action episode of The Super Mario Bros. Super Show!
- "Heartthrob" (Angel), an episode of the American television show Angel
- Heartthrob (album), studio album by Tegan and Sara
- Heartthrob (film), a 2017 American thriller film
- Heart Throb (My Little Pony), a Pegasus pony in the My Little Pony franchise
- Heart Throbs, a romance comic published by Quality Comics and DC Comics
- The Heart Throbs, an American professional wrestling tag team
- The Heart Throbs (band), a British indie-rock band
