= Wild river (disambiguation) =

A wild river is a river that is intentionally kept in a natural state.

Wild river or similar terms may also refer to:

== Rivers and natural areas ==
- Wild River (Androscoggin River), New Hampshire and Maine, US
- Wild River (Alaska)
- Wild River Dam in Queensland, Australia
- Wild River State Park in Minnesota, US
- Wild Rivers Recreation Area, New Mexico, USA
- National Wild and Scenic Rivers System, a river preservation act
  - List of National Wild and Scenic Rivers

== Other ==
- Wild River (film), a 1960 Elia Kazan drama film
- Wild River Review, an online magazine
- Wild Rivers (band)
- Wild Rivers (water park), a water park in California
- Wild Rivers, a 1983 book by Bob Brown

== See also ==
- River Wild (disambiguation)
