= K-Town =

K-Town may refer to:

== Koreatown ==
A Koreatown is a Korean-dominated ethnic enclave within a city outside the Korean Peninsula:

- Koreatown, Los Angeles, California, United States
- Koreatown, Manhattan, New York City, United States
- Koreatown, Palisades Park, New Jersey, United States
- Koreatown, Queens, New York City, United States
- Koreatown, Toronto, Ontario, Canada

== Belgium ==
- Kortrijk, West Flanders

== Canada ==
- Kelowna, British Columbia
- Kingston, Ontario
- Kitchener, Ontario

== Germany ==
- Kaiserslautern, a city close to Ramstein Air Base; Kaiserslautern is a long name and sometimes difficult to pronounce for non-German speakers, therefore the abbreviation
  - Kaiserslautern Military Community

== India ==
- Kodambakkam, Chennai, Tamil Nadu
  - Kollywood (Tamil Cinema)

== Japan ==
- Kawasaki, Kanagawa
- Kobe, Hyogo
- Kyoto

== Netherlands ==
- Kortenhoef, North Holland

== Norway ==
- Kristiansand

== Pakistan ==
- Karachi

== Sweden ==
- Komarken, Kungälv

== United Kingdom ==
- Keighley, West Yorkshire
- Kettering, Northamptonshire

== United States ==
- K-Town, Chicago, a neighborhood in North Lawndale, Illinois, United States
  - K-Town Historic District
- Kansas City, Missouri
- Kaysville, Utah
- Kearny, New Jersey
- Kenosha, Wisconsin
- Kensington, Maryland
- Kilgore, Texas
- Knoxville, Tennessee
- Kremmling, Colorado

== Other usages ==
- Kuwait, a Middle Eastern country
- Billboard K-Town, an online magazine column
- "K-Town" (LEXX episode), an episode of the science fiction TV series LEXX
- K-Town (web series), an American reality television series
