= Dark Summer (film) =

- Directed by: Paul Solet
- Written by: Mike Le
- Produced by: Ross M. Dinerstein
- Starring: Keir Gilchrist; Stella Maeve; Maestro Harrell; Grace Phipps; Peter Stormare
- Cinematography: Zoran Popovich
- Edited by: Benjamin Cassou; Josh Ethier
- Music by: Austin Wintory
- Production companies: Campfire; ContentFilm International
- Distributed by: IFC Midnight
- Release date: January 9, 2015
- Running time: 81 minutes
- Country: United States
- Language: English

Dark Summer is a 2015 American supernatural horror film directed by Paul Solet and written by Mike Le. The film stars Keir Gilchrist, Stella Maeve, Maestro Harrell, Grace Phipps, and Peter Stormare. Gilchrist plays a teenager who is restricted to house arrest after stalking a female classmate online. After she commits suicide, he becomes convinced that she is haunting him. It was released on January 9, 2015.

== Plot ==
Daniel Austin (Keir Gilchrist), age 17, has been placed under house arrest for stalking his classmate Mona Wilson (Grace Phipps) and hacking into all of her accounts on social media. Under the terms of his house arrest, he is not allowed visits from unaccompanied minors nor is he allowed access to his computer (which has been confiscated by the authorities) or the internet. His I.P. address has been tagged so as to alert authorities if he attempts to access any social media. As his mother is away on business, he is alone in the house. Daniel's parole officer, Stokes (Peter Stormare), explains that Daniel's monitoring tag will go off if he goes past the edge of the front lawn. If he does not retreat within five seconds, he will be arrested. Daniel mentions hearing of someone under house arrest who cut off their foot to get the monitoring tag off so they could flee to Mexico.

Despite the restrictions placed on Daniel, his friends Abby Feller and Kevin Dowdle visit and bring him a tablet so that he can access a neighbor's internet connection and Skype his mother. As the three converse by the pool, it is rather clear that Abby has a crush on her friend Daniel. Daniel explains that he wasn't interested in Mona but then developed an obsession - virtually overnight.

When he is about to Skype his mother, Abby contacts him instead. After a brief conversation, he receives an incoming Skype call from Mona, who commits suicide by gunshot on camera.

Following this incident, Daniel becomes more and more paranoid, and keeps seeing Mona in the house. Daniel and his friends attempt a seance to contact the spirit of Mona. The idea is that by each holding pens, Mona will communicate with them. Instead, Daniel and Kevin stab Abby through the hand with their pens. She is then lifted up and dragged across the wall. Afterwards, we see the blood from her injured hand spells out 'Daniel' on the wall.

After more supernatural events, Abby and Kevin head over to the dead girl's house. They are looking for a personal item of Mona's they can use as part of a ritual to help her move on to the afterlife. When they arrive at the house, they find it empty. They break in and, guided by Daniel who has a blueprint of the house, they head to Mona's room which is bare apart from a blood-stained mattress (from Mona shooting herself). They realize, with Daniel's help, that there is a false wall at the back of a closet which leads to a secret room which contains a number of strange artifacts and a large number of photos of Daniel; Mona was stalking Daniel, not the other way around. One of the items they find has a strange symbol embossed on it. Daniel finds out what it is and uses the name of the symbol as the password to Mona's cloud account. There he finds a folder called 'Daniel' which contains a spell.

It turns out that Mona secretly had a crush on Daniel, and had been obsessively stalking him for a long time. She put a spell on Daniel to make him fall in love with her. It worked, but he was too shy to contact her, so Mona used a second spell so that her spirit could enter into Daniel's body alongside his own spirit so they would be together. There are five steps to the spell, the first of which was Mona's suicide. They realize that if all the steps are not completed by Daniel, the spell will fail. Abby therefore takes the last step, hoping that this will break the spell. However, Abby has already unwittingly carried out the previous steps of the spell so performing the last step brings Mona's spirit into her body. While they are cleaning up after the failed seance, Mona, now possessing Abby, kills Kevin and knocks Daniel out. Gagging him with duct tape, she then cuts off Daniel's leg so she can remove his house arrest monitor and abduct him without notice. When Stokes visits, he sees the severed leg on the floor and just thinks Daniel has absconded, as he described when he was first fitted with the tag.

In a post-credits scene, Abby, still possessed by Mona's spirit, is seen driving a gagged Daniel out of town while he lets out muffled screams.

== Cast ==
- Keir Gilchrist as Daniel Austin
- Stella Maeve as Abby Feller
- Maestro Harrell as Kevin Dowdle
- Grace Phipps as Mona Wilson
- Peter Stormare as Stokes
- Dinora Walcott as Principal Walcott

== Production ==
Grace director Paul Solet was presented an early version of Mike Le's script titled House Arrest, which was originally a found footage film. Solet officially signed on to direct the film, now retitled Dark Summer, in May 2013, with Ross M. Dinerstein and Jamie Carmichael serving as producer and executive producer respectively. According to Solet, the script's structure and twists were retained from Le's draft, with the dialogue and overall execution being reworked in rewrites. That August, Stella Maeve was cast as one of the lead characters. Filming began in early August 2013.

== Release ==
IFC Films bought the distribution rights to Dark Summer in October 2014, and gave the film a limited release on January 9, 2015 under their IFC Midnight label. Shout! Factory released it on DVD and Blu-ray on July 7, 2015.

== Reception ==
On review aggregation site Rotten Tomatoes, Dark Summer holds an approval rating of 29% based on 24 reviews, with an average rating of 4.50/10. On Metacritic, the film holds an average rating of 31 out of 100, indicating "generally unfavorable" reviews.

Peter Bradshaw for The Guardian gave the film a positive review, calling it "an efficiently crafted, small-scale film with an interesting premise". Writing for The List, Hannah McGill wrote "it’s a fairly standard chiller with some above average ideas and decent scares."

Wendy Ide of The Times said the film "relies heavily on sledgehammer sound design and creepy imagery in the absence of a persuasive story." For Variety, Dennis Harvey said "While competently made, Dark Summer makes no effort to lend its characters any psychological complexity". Time Out's Trevor Johnston wrote that the film "offers fairly meagre chills."
