= Amnesiac (film) =

- Directed by: Michael Polish
- Written by: Amy Kolquist; Mike Le
- Produced by: Jarod Becker; Charles Arthur Berg; Kate Bosworth; Eric Brenner; Lee Broda; Aleks de Carvalho; Erik Fleming; Grant Guthrie; Phillip Stewart Halpern; Richard Halpern; Sydney Holland; Lucas Jarach; Michael Kay; Corey Large; Mike Le; Alan Pao; Jacob Pechenik; Gary Preisler; Jason Price; Jeff Rice
- Starring: Kate Bosworth; Wes Bentley
- Cinematography: Jayson Crothers
- Edited by: Timothy Alverson
- Music by: Aleks de Carvalho
- Production companies: Infra-Red Pictures; Jeff Rice Films; No Mystery Media; Rich Hippie Productions; Wiretap Films
- Distributed by: XLrator Media
- Release date: December 14, 2014
- Running time: 90 minutes
- Country: United States
- Language: English

Amnesiac (released in the United Kingdom as Unconscious) is a 2014 American mystery film directed by Michael Polish and written by Mike Le and Amy Kolquist.

== Plot ==
The film begins with a family of three traveling along a highway. The scene ends with a child screaming, and the man (Wes Bentley) is seen resting in a bed, in a large room, attached to hospital equipment. The woman (Kate Bosworth) visits him dressed in formal business attire, which is a frequently re-occurring theme in the film.

The man is shown to become suspicious of the woman, who claims to be his wife. When she leaves to conduct errands, the man explores the house. After leafing through a photo album, he searches the basement where he finds a film projector, medical tools, anatomy charts and books, and a corpse hidden in a cabinet. He confronts the woman when she returns home, who explains that the corpse is her first husband before knocking the man unconscious and drugging him.

The man wakes up restrained to a bed, his captor being the woman. She administers shock treatment, telling him that he must provide a family for her if he wishes the ordeal to end. When asked why the photo album contains no photographs of the woman or of her late husband, the two become involved in a physical confrontation. He attempts to subdue her, but is in turn subdued when hit with a nearby vase. He is restrained, but escapes briefly before being knocked unconscious. A visiting postman is killed by the woman who pushes the body into the basement. A detective assigns an officer to investigate a report regarding a missing man, who is the mailman.

While the woman dismembers the postman downstairs, the female officer comes to the door. She attempts to gain entry to the premises, and is promptly killed by the woman. It is at this point that the male detective begins investigating the premises himself.

The man asks about the little girl he sees in brief memory flashbacks. The woman reveals a little girl in a cage and claims she is their daughter Audrey. When released, Audrey grabs a knife and attacks the woman. However, the woman renders Audrey unconscious and puts her in a bathtub.

The detective shows up at the front door, interrupting the woman as she prepares to perform a lobotomy on the man. After sending the detective away, she goes to drown Audrey in the bathtub. The man breaks free and renders his captor unconscious with the lid of the toilet, but collapses on the floor whilst the girl escapes from the house.

He wakes in a hospital bed, where he is interviewed by the detective. On asking about the girl thought to be his daughter, it is revealed that she is actually the daughter of Mason Williams. Both the man and woman willfully kidnapped Audrey hoping that the ransom money would pay for the woman’s fertility treatments. The man claims that the woman killed all of the people discovered in the house, but the detective reveals that she was never found.

Dressed as a nurse, the woman infiltrates the hospital and euthanizes the man.

== Cast ==
- Kate Bosworth as Woman
- Wes Bentley as Man
- Olivia Rose Keegan as Audrey
- Shashawnee Hall as Detective
- Richard Riehle as Postman
- Patrick Bauchau as Doctor
- Mia Barron as Officer Rogers

== Production ==
The film was produced under the working title Unconscious. This title was also used for the film's UK release.

== Reception ==
The film received a rating of 27% on review aggregator Rotten Tomatoes based on 15 reviews.
