= River Wild =

2023 film by Ben Ketai

- Official release poster
- Directed by: Ben Ketai
- Screenplay by: Ben Ketai; Mike Nguyen Le
- Story by: Denis O'Neill
- Based on: The River Wild by Denis O'Neill
- Produced by: Ogden Gavanski; Daniel Kresmery; Thiago Andreo Barbosa Nogueira; Anne-Marie Roberge
- Starring: Adam Brody; Leighton Meester; Taran Killam
- Cinematography: Gevorg Gev Juguryan
- Edited by: Ben Callahan
- Music by: Tristan Clopet
- Production companies: Universal 1440 Entertainment; Hero Squared Productions
- Distributed by: Universal Pictures Home Entertainment
- Release date: August 1, 2023
- Running time: 91 minutes
- Country: United States
- Language: English

River Wild is a 2023 American action thriller film that is a reimagining of the 1994 film The River Wild and a modern-day standalone sequel. It was directed by Ben Ketai, from a script he co-authored with Mike Nguyen Le. The film stars Adam Brody, Leighton Meester, and Taran Killam.

The film entered principal photography commenced in July 2022 in Hungary, wrapping later that year. River Wild was released direct-to-home video through physical and digital release, on August 1, 2023.

== Plot ==
Siblings Gray and Joey meet up to go whitewater rafting on a river along with their friends Trevor, Karissa and Van. While rafting, they stop at a place for swimming, bathing and drinking. While enjoying laughs over a campfire, Van and Trevor leave the group for a short while, when Trevor suddenly shouts for help, saying that Van tripped and fell. Gray asks Trevor to call the Ranger phone, but Trevor says the phone is dead. Van whispers to Joey that Trevor grabbed her. Joey, being in the medical field, diagnoses Van as suffering from a skull fracture.

The group get on the raft, believing help to be a couple of hours away, when Van begins having a seizure, and Joey calms her down. Gray directs Trevor to row in a certain direction for safety's sake, but he doesn't and the boat is briefly capsized. Joey tells Gray that Trevor may have deliberately flipped the boat, and that Van told her that he attacked her.

Daylight dawns and they stop the boat to go up a hill to get a medic. Trevor reveals he is a felon, and did three years in prison, and makes Gray promise that he wouldn't send Trevor back. They find the ranger and tell him they need a chopper for a head wound. When the ranger tries to use the radio to call it in, Trevor panics and stabs him with a knife, before breaking the radio. Trevor grabs the ranger's gun and convinces Gray to throw the ranger with his truck off a cliff, where it explodes.

The girls see the gun in Trevor's hand, and he tells them that the ranger is dead, and demands that they row to Canada. During the trip, Van succumbs to her head wound. Joey attracts the attention of a passer-by on a bridge, but Trevor talks his way out of it. They stop for the night, where they bury Van, and Trevor ties up the rest, so they don't escape. At nighttime, the man Joey saw on the bridge sneaks up and tries to take the gun from Trevor, to free the hostages, but is shot down by Trevor. While burying the dead man, Karissa takes his Swiss army knife without anyone else noticing.

The next day, the girls are tied and Gray alone rows the boat. Karissa uses the Swiss army knife to cut the raft, forcing the group to land and patch up the hole. Gray, while rummaging to find something to repair the raft, stuns Trevor with a spray and starts a fight but gets shot. Karissa manages to cut her rope and runs away with Joey. With Trevor pursuing them, the girls run separate ways. Trevor follows Joey, who is able to give him the slip and goes back to see her brother, shot in his stomach. Gray and Joey leave on the raft just as Trevor arrives. He finds two other rafters and kills them to get a hold of a raft, chasing Gray and Joey who enter heavy river currents, falling off their raft and running aground.

Trevor catches them, and stabs Joey in the back, just as Gray grabs Trevor and throws him down onto a rock, sacrificing himself in the process. In the aftermath, Karissa brings a chopper to the site and rescues Joey.

== Cast ==
- Leighton Meester as Joey Reese
- Taran Killam as Gray Reese
- Adam Brody as Trevor
- Olivia Swann as Karissa
- Eve Connolly as Van
- Matt Devere as Walt
- Nick Wittman as Max
- Courtney Chen as EMT
- Kiel Kennedy as James

== Production ==
=== Development ===
In July 2022, it was announced that a feature film reimagining of The River Wild had entered production, while principal photography had already commenced in Hungary by that time. Directed by Ben Ketai from a script he co-authored with Mike Nguyen Le. Produced by Ogden Gavanski, the project is a Universal 1440 Entertainment production and will be distributed by Universal Filmed Entertainment Group. Though it was announced as a remake/reboot by tabloids, the executives of the studio called the movie a "new The River Wild story" in the "universe" of the original indicating that it is a standalone-sequel taking place in a contemporary setting.

Ketai later stated that the story, while similar and inspired by the first installment, would differ in how the events unfold over the story. While the events of The River Wild (1994) happen by circumstance with the Hartman family meeting the bad guys along the river, the events of River Wild (2023) would result from a pre-existing relationship and the tension that the group has. The filmmaker said "In our movie, the danger comes from within the group. ...[It's] a more intimate and gritty story, but in the same exciting setting as the original."

=== Casting ===
The cast was announced in July 2022, to include Leighton Meester, Taran Killam, and Adam Brody. The trio of stars, who appear alongside a supporting cast, feature as the story's siblings Joey and Gary Reese, and their childhood friend Trevor, respectively.

=== Filming ===
Principal photography commenced in July 2022, with filming taking place in Eastern Europe including Hungary, Slovakia, and Bosnia and Herzegovina, as well as Croatia. The cast and crew drove from location to location, with the cast receiving extensive training at an Olympic Games training facility in Liptovský Mikuláš, Slovakia prior to the production commencement. Meester described the production as physical stating that the heat of summer, the cold of the river water, and the emotional subject matter as "challenging".

She and her real-life husband, Brody, stated that though they initially believed that filming the project might bring intensity home with them after work, they both found the process to be natural, easily switching off from their roles between takes, with relief that it didn't affect their personal lives. Meester stated that working with her husband "made every moment enjoyable and put [her] at ease", which also "gave [her] an innate sense of safety." Brody found the production to be fun, humorously stating: "But my absolute favorite part of filming was chasing Leighton through the woods at full speed." Killam stated that the physical preparation for the role made him feel prepared for the production while comparing the training to that of his wife Cobie Smulders who has appeared in various action roles.

== Release ==
The film was released on digital, DVD and Netflix on August 1, 2023.
