= K-Town (web series) =

- Genre: Reality
- Directed by: Eugene Choi, Eddie Kim, and Mike Le
- Creative directors: Eugene Choi, Eddie Kim, and Mike Le
- Starring: Cammy Chung, Christine Chang, Jasmine Chang, Joe Cha, Jowe Lee, Scarlet Chan, Steve Kim, Violet Kim, Young Lee, So Young Park
- Country of origin: United States
- Original language: English
- No. of seasons: 2
- No. of episodes: 17

Production
- Executive producers: Tyrese Gibson, Eugene Choi, Eddie Kim, Mike Le, Evan Bregman, Tony DiSanto, Liz Gateley, Benjamin Silverman
- Producers: Jerry Chan, Morrow Pettigrew
- Production locations: Los Angeles, California
- Cinematography: Ray Huang, Aaron Torres, Jon Peter
- Editors: Jerry Chan, Peter Samet
- Camera setup: Ray Huang, Aaron Torres, Jon Peter, Kacper Skowron
- Running time: about 22 minutes per episode
- Production companies: Electus, HQ Pictures

Original release
- Network: Loud
- Release: July 11, 2012 – January 9, 2013

Related
- Roll Models

K-Town is an American reality television series about the lives of a group of young Asian Americans living in Los Angeles' Koreatown. The cast is mostly of Korean descent, with the exception of Scarlet Chan (who is of Chinese descent). The show ran for two seasons.

The series is directed by Eugene Choi, Eddie Kim and Mike Le, produced by Choi, Kim, Le as well as Tyrese Gibson and Jerry Chan, edited by Jerry Chan, with cinematography from Ray Huang, Aaron Torres and Jon Peter.

Initial press reports announced Jennifer Field and Peter Le, a known pornographic webcam personality, as cast members, but they were replaced by Cammy Chung and Jowe Lee due to scheduling conflicts according to co-director and co-producer Eddie Kim.

== Cast ==
- Cammy Chung (Season 1)
- Christine Chang (Season 2)
- Julian Cheang
- Jasmine Chang
- Joe Cha
- Jowe Lee
- Scarlet Chan
- Steve Kim
- Violet Kim
- Young Lee
- So Young Park
