= Vincent Newman =

American film producer

Vincent Newman (born 1965) is an American film producer.

== Filmography ==
=== Producer ===
- Soundman (1998) (co-producer)
- The Last Marshal (1999) (producer)
- A Better Way to Die (2000) (executive producer)
- In the Shadows (2001) (producer)
- Poolhall Junkies (2002) (producer)
- Sol Goode (2003) (producer)
- A Man Apart (2003) (producer)
- Blind Horizon (2003) (producer)
- Felon (2008) (executive producer)
- The Betrayed (2008) (producer)
- Red Dawn (2012) (executive producer)
- We're the Millers (2013) (producer)
- Patient Zero (2018) (producer)
- Maybe I Do (2023) (producer)
- Eleven Days (TBA) (producer)
