= Olivia Rose Keegan =

American actress, singer, model

- Born: San Rafael, California
- Occupation: Actress
- Years active: 2012–present

Olivia Rose Keegan (born November 22, 1999) is an American actress. She came to prominence playing Claire Brady on NBC network daytime soap opera Days of Our Lives. She was nominated for the Daytime Emmy Award for Outstanding Younger Actress in a Drama Series for the role in 2018 and 2019, and was the first winner for the Outstanding Younger Performer in a Drama Series category in 2020. She played the recurring role of Lily in the second season of the Disney+ television series High School Musical: The Musical: The Series. In 2023, Keegan starred as Duela, the daughter of the Joker, on The CW superhero television series Gotham Knights.

== Early life ==
Keegan was born in San Rafael, California to Kevin and Julie Keegan. She began performing in community theater at age seven.

== Career ==
At age eleven, Keegan decided she wanted to switch her focus from stage acting to on-camera acting, and soon booked roles in the short film Picture Perfect and the 2013 film Decoding Annie Parker. From 2012 to 2014, she worked on the television film Hand of God, and the film Amnesiac. She guest-starred on several TV shows, including Modern Family, Sam & Cat, Enlisted, and Growing Up Fisher. In 2015, she guest-starred in an episode of The Thundermans, and starred in a family film called Salvation Street. Keegan is signed with Paradigm Talent and Artistic Endeavors.

In 2015 she booked the role of Claire Brady on the soap opera Days of Our Lives, a role which she played through 2020. In 2018, she released a song, "Queen is a King". In early 2020, she joined the cast in the second season of the Disney+ television series High School Musical: The Musical: The Series playing the recurring role of Lily. In March 2022, Keegan was cast in a starring role, playing Duela on the television series Gotham Knights, which premiered on The CW on March 14, 2023.

== Filmography ==
=== Film ===
Year	Title	Role	Notes
2012	Hand of God	Lily	
2013	Decoding Annie Parker	Young Joan	
2013	Ashley	Gabby	
2014	Amnesiac	Audrey Williams	
2015	Salvation Street	Brianna	
2025	Swiped	Chloe	
2026	Scary Movie	Sara Campbell	
TBA	Fog City	TBA	

=== Television ===
Year	Title	Role	Notes
2012	A.N.T. Farm	Australian Girl	Episode: "EndurANTs"
2013	Modern Family	Simone	Episode: "Best Men"
2013	Sam & Cat	Alexa Bickley	Episode: "#BabysittingCommercial"
2014	Enlisted	Megan	Episode: "Brothers and Sister"
2014	Growing Up Fisher	Brooklyn	Episode: "Drug/Bust"
2014	Wilfred	Cute Girl	Episode: "Amends"
2015	The Thundermans	Sabrina	Episode: "The Girl with the Dragon Snafu"
2015–2020	Days of Our Lives	Claire Brady	Contract role
2018–2019	The Bay	Tandi Jo Henderson	4 episodes
2019	All American	Emma	Episode: "Speak Ya Clout"
2021–2022	High School Musical: The Musical: The Series	Lily	Recurring role (season 2); guest role (season 3)
2022	All Rise	Gigi	Episode: "The Game"
2023	Gotham Knights	Duela	Main role; 13 episodes
2023	Daisy Jones & the Six	Caroline	2 episodes
2026	Dutton Ranch	Whitney Ayers	Episode: "Earn Another Day"

=== Video game ===
Year	Title	Role	Notes
2021	Call of Duty: Vanguard	Constanze Muller	Motion capture only

== Awards and nominations ==
Year	Award	Category	Work	Result	Ref.
2018	Daytime Emmy Award	Outstanding Younger Actress in a Drama Series	Days of Our Lives	Nominated	
2019	Daytime Emmy Award	Outstanding Younger Actress in a Drama Series	Days of Our Lives	Nominated	
2020	Daytime Emmy Award	Outstanding Younger Performer in a Drama Series	Days of Our Lives	Won	
2020	Soap Hub Awards	Favorite Younger Actress	Days of Our Lives	Won	
