= Flipped (2015 film) =

- Directed by: Harris Demel
- Written by: Harris Demel; Rob Greenberg
- Produced by: Rob Greenberg; Jason Mandl; Chris Sheng
- Starring: Michael Madsen; Stella Maeve; Evan Taubenfeld
- Cinematography: Josh Silfen
- Edited by: Charles T. Jones; Mark Scovil
- Music by: Hayden Clement
- Release date: December 15, 2015
- Country: United States
- Language: English

Flipped (also known as Blood Rush) is a 2015 psychological/survival thriller film starring Michael Madsen and Stella Maeve. The film concerns a supermodel, trapped inside a crashed upside-down car, who randomly calls a mysterious stranger for help on her cell phone. However, emergency assistance is the last thing on the stranger's mind.

== Plot summary ==
Nicole Diamond is an A-list fashion model and girlfriend of Scotty Dee, a pop star known in the tabloids for his rowdy behavior and legal troubles. It's revealed - through non-linear narrative - that after arguing in their car, the couple suffered a rollover accident off a cliff in a remote area, pinning both passengers upside-down in the vehicle.

Distraught from her injuries and unable to make communication with an unresponsive Scotty, Nicole fails to finish dialing "911" on her mobile phone due to a cracked touchscreen. She uses her car phone to reach out to friend Donna; however, the answering machine fails to detect anyone speaking and terminates the call. Attempts to dial random numbers for help are also unsuccessful until she reaches "Casey" (Madsen), who has just gotten out of bed.

At first, the man appears engaged and sympathetic to Nicole's situation but quickly takes amusement in her crisis and the health risks of ischaemia from cut-off blood circulation. Nicole does not catch on to Casey's torment until it is clear that he has no interest in tracing her call for a rescue team; he has discovered her celebrity status by searching her name on Wikipedia, and decides to use it to his own abusive advantage.

Casey's particular focus is Nicole's codependent relationship with Scotty - a bad boy known for a string of abusive past relationships - and questions why she doesn't date run-of-the-mill "nice guys", which Casey facetiously refers as himself in third person. The conversation between them quickly devolves into a psychological battle of wits, all whilst Nicole wards off a wolf and tries to remain calm when a rattlesnake slithers into her car, circling her neck and Scotty's before she kills it with a shard of glass. The wolf returns and begins to gnaw at Scotty's head, suggesting that he died from the crash. Hungry, thirsty and increasingly more desperate, Nicole is unable to disconnect the line with Casey, and the wreck apparently misses the scope of a helicopter's searchlight.

As the totaled vehicle begins to catch fire, Nicole manages to squeeze her legs out of the loosened dashboard and climbs out of the car. Unable to walk, she crawls away from the fiery wreck when an unknown man in camouflaged pants approaches and drags her in another direction, asking again (in Casey's voice) why she dated Scotty. She finally replies, "because I didn't deserve better". The unknown man turns into Nicole's alter ego and replies to her that she does deserve better, before turning into one of the rescue personnel. Nicole looks back at her burning car and says, "they're gone", leaving the existence of the caller as ambiguous since he shared Nicole's full birth name and knew what was going on the whole time.
