= Patient Zero (film) =

2018 film by Stefan Ruzowitzky

- Theatrical release poster
- Directed by: Stefan Ruzowitzky
- Written by: Mike Le
- Produced by: Vincent Newman
- Starring: Matt Smith; Natalie Dormer; John Bradley; Clive Standen; Agyness Deyn; Stanley Tucci
- Cinematography: Benedict Neuenfels
- Edited by: Mark Stevens
- Music by: Michael Wandmacher
- Production company: Vincent Newman Entertainment
- Distributed by: Vertical Entertainment Destination Films
- Release date: 14 August 2018 (United States)
- Running time: 93 minutes
- Countries: United Kingdom; United States
- Language: English

Patient Zero is a 2018 science fiction horror film directed by Stefan Ruzowitzky and written by Mike Le. The film stars Matt Smith, Natalie Dormer, John Bradley, Stanley Tucci, Agyness Deyn, and Clive Standen. The plot involves a group of survivors who set out to find an antidote for a highly contagious virus that turns the infected into a ravenous but highly intelligent new species.

After a bidding war between several studios over a script penned by Le, Screen Gems eventually won the rights. Ruzowitzky signed on to direct in May 2014. Casting began in September 2014 and lasted until March 2015. Principal photography began on 3 March 2015 in London, before ending on 18 April.

Originally set to be released in September 2016, Patient Zero was pushed back to February 2017 and was removed from the Screen Gems release schedule. The film was finally released through video on demand on 14 August 2018, with a limited theatrical release on 14 September by Vertical Entertainment.

== Plot ==
After an outbreak of a mutated form of rabies that spreads from animals to humans, over 7 billion humans are dead or infected. People who are bitten turn rabid in 90 seconds. Morgan was riding in a car with his wife Janet when they were attacked. Both were infected, but he remained human with the ability to communicate with the infected.

Now with a large group of civilians, CDC scientists, and U.S. military in an underground nuclear base, Morgan and virologist Dr. Gina Rose bring in the infected and interrogate them, hoping to find the Patient Zero and devise a cure. Gina struggles with tensions between herself, Morgan, and Colonel Knox, compounded by Knox being attracted to Gina while she is currently intimate with Morgan. Morgan visits with Janet, who is held captive amongst others in the underground base. She's being treated with an experimental treatment derived from Morgan's blood.

Gina is shown with a positive pregnancy test. Bodies of fallen soldiers are being cremated when one opens his eyes and attacks the workers and soldiers. After a one-on-one fight with Knox, he is subdued and asks to speak with Morgan specifically, who is surprised that the patient is unaffected by the music that has driven the other infected into a rage. He even lights and starts smoking a cigarette from his pocket. The team assumes he's closely linked to Patient Zero. The patient reveals that he was a college professor and his school was attacked by the infected during one of his lectures. He was bitten but still maintains most of his human abilities. The Professor tells Morgan that the infected are evolved humans, a more advanced species that are at the top of the food chain. Their debate raises Morgan's suspicions, and soon Morgan finds that another of their previous patients, nicknamed Pete Townshend, has a transmitter sewn inside his chest, revealing that the infected laid a trap to learn where the base is located.

The infected swarm inside, killing or infecting all the humans, including civilians. Now overrun Knox shoots his commander so the infected are slowed down long enough for him and Gina to make it to the elevator. Horrified by his actions, Gina grabs his gun. He tries to tell her he wanted to save her life. They begin to scuffle and the gun goes off, killing Knox. Gina goes to the cells where the infected are kept and finds Morgan releasing Janet. Gina pleads with him to leave Janet since the treatments work but only temporarily, but he refuses. They sneak to Gina's lab, retrieve her samples, and crawl through the vents. They encounter an infected lab rat, which Janet kills before it can get to Gina. They make it to the parking lot just below ground level.

The Professor confronts them and explains that he came to the base to kill Morgan. Morgan is their "Patient Zero" and is a threat to their survival. They fight and the Professor starts calling other infected, until Morgan impales him on a pipe. The trio flees until Janet tells them to run and she will buy them time, telling Morgan he must leave her to save the baby, as she sensed that Gina is pregnant. This distracts Morgan long enough for Janet to close a heavy vault door just in time to stop the horde. Through a window in the door, Janet wipes a tear from her face, indicating that she was now able to cry and that the treatment was working and restoring her humanity, and mouths "I love you".

Morgan and Gina follow the tunnel out to the woods and find a motorcycle. They ride off into the night with Morgan understanding that he must do whatever it takes to take care of their baby and save some remnant of the human race.

== Cast ==
- Matt Smith as Morgan
- Natalie Dormer as Gina
- John Bradley as Scooter
- Clive Standen as Colonel Knox
- Colin McFarlane as General Pierce
- Agyness Deyn as Janet
- Stanley Tucci as The Professor
- James Northcote as "Pete Townshend"
- Frederick Schmidt as "Joe Cocker"

== Production ==
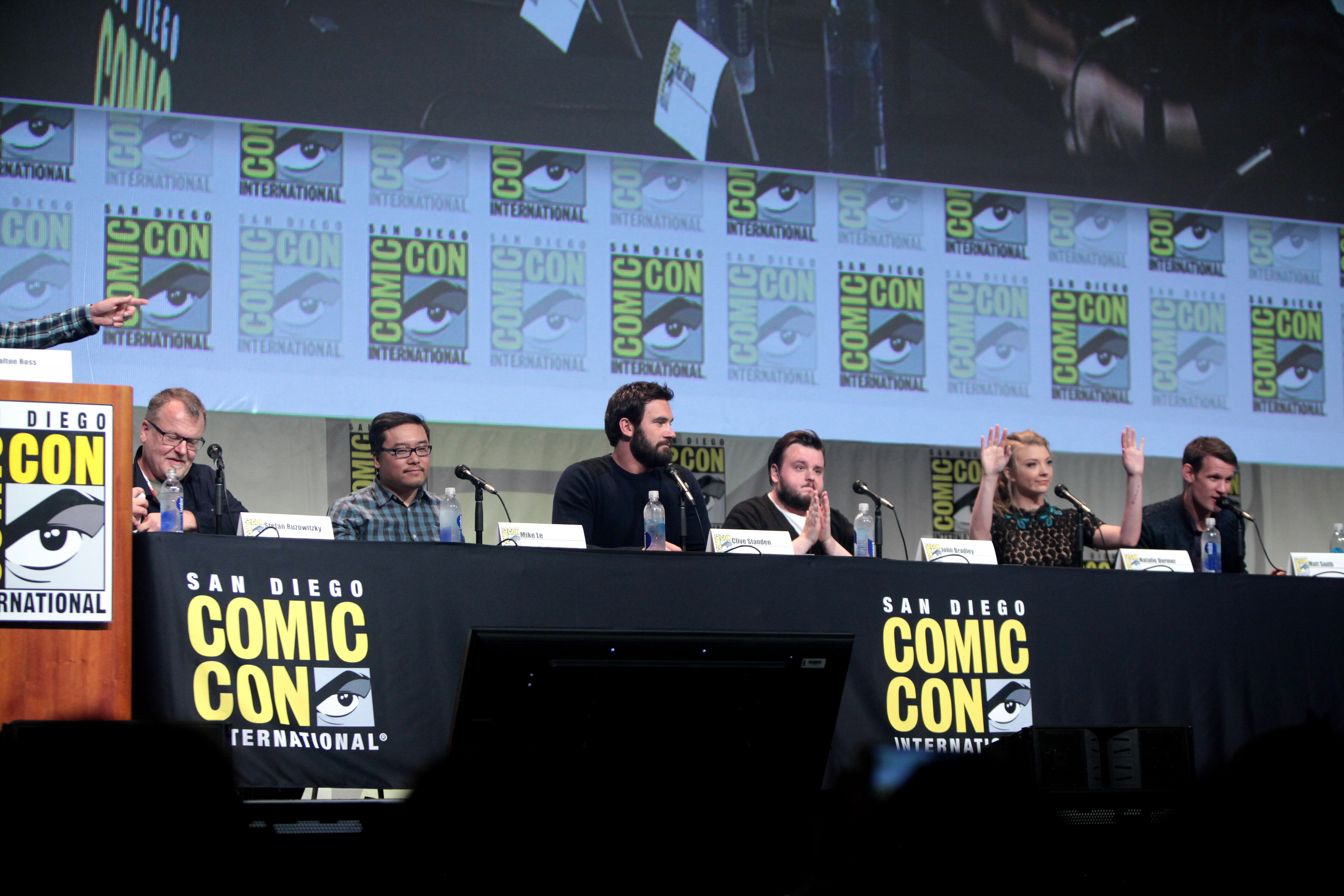
The cast and crew of Patient Zero at the 2015 San Diego Comic-Con to promote the film.

The script, initially titled Patient Z, was featured on the 2013 Black List, an annual survey showcasing the "most liked" motion picture screenplays unproduced. Set in a post-apocalyptic world full of zombies, the story follows a man who speaks their language questions the undead in order to find a cure for his infected wife. The screenplay was the subject of a bidding war between several different studios including Fox Searchlight Pictures, Silver Pictures, Davis Entertainment, Broken Road Productions, Donners' Company, Vincent Newman Entertainment and Misher Films. Screen Gems eventually won the bidding war and Vincent Newman was set to produce through his company Vincent Newman Entertainment. Austrian director Stefan Ruzowitzky was set to direct the film on 2 May 2014. When the screenplay was first sold, the creatures were zombies, though this aspect was eventually removed during subsequent rewrites.

On 24 September 2014, it was announced that Natalie Dormer would join the cast, followed by Matt Smith joining that November. Other roles were announced in early 2015 with Stanley Tucci joining in January, John Bradley and Clive Standen joining in February, and Agyness Deyn joining in March.

=== Filming ===
Principal photography on the film began in London on 3 March 2015. From 9 March, filming took place at Shepperton Studios and would also take place in and around London through 18 April 2015. Some filming took place in Welwyn Garden City, Hertfordshire on 15 March 2015, where a SWAT van and car were seen on set.

== Release ==
In August 2015, Sony Pictures Entertainment announced that Patient Zero would be released on 2 September 2016 in the United States. On 28 April 2016, the film was delayed to 17 February 2017. In January 2017, the film was removed from the release schedule. The film was released through video on demand on 14 August 2018, before receiving a limited theatrical release on 14 September 2018, by Vertical Entertainment.

=== Marketing ===
The film was promoted at San Diego Comic-Con 2016, which was attended by Smith, Dormer, Standen, Bradley, Ruzowitsky, and Le. On 11 July 2015, a rough cut of the film's trailer was screened during the Screen Gems panel. Standen explained that the film's tension centers on the infected thinking they are "the new evolution of mankind" who want to wipe out the human race.

=== Reception ===
Patient Zero holds an approval rating of 11% on Rotten Tomatoes based on nine reviews, with an average rating of 4/10.

Geoff Berkshire, writing for the Los Angeles Times, described the film as "a post-apocalyptic pandemic movie that’s more grade-Z than World War Z", and concluded: "A near future where a divided humankind is so full of anger at people different from themselves that they literally turn into monsters? It’s a frightful thought for frightful times. But it’s also the only thought this slipshod thriller contains in its not-so-pretty little package." Jeffrey M. Anderson of Common Sense Media gave the film a score of 1 star out of 5, saying that it "eventually wanders cluelessly off track, but, as it consists mainly of yelling, sudden loud noises, and camera-shaking, it gets aggravating long before that happens."

In an interview with Capital Radio in 2025, Smith described feeling that "this is going to be rubbish" during production, and that he'd nicknamed the film "Patient Career Low".
