= Stella Maeve =

American actress

- Born: Stella Maeve Johnston; November 14, 1989 (age 36)
- Occupation: Actress
- Years active: 2005–present
- Partner: Benjamin Wadsworth (2019–2025)
- Children: 1

External image
- Maeve in 2018.

Stella Maeve (born November 14, 1989) is an American film and television actress. Highlights include a starring role in The Runaways (2010), a two-season recurring role in NBC television's Chicago P.D., and a main role in SyFy television's The Magicians.

== Career ==
=== Film ===
Maeve's first feature film role was in the comedy-drama, Transamerica (2005). She had minor roles in the 2008 comedy, Harold, and the crime drama, Brooklyn's Finest (2009).

In 2010, Maeve played Sandy West, alongside Kristen Stewart and Dakota Fanning, in The Runaways. The drama is set in the 1970s and is about an all-girl rock band of the same name.

=== TV ===
Maeve made appearances on multiple television series, including recurring roles in Gossip Girl during the 2008–09 season; and in House during the 2010–11 season. In 2013, Maeve was cast as the younger sister of Detective Walter Clark (Theo James) in CBS's crime drama television series, Golden Boy. In January 2014, Maeve began appearing in a recurring role on Chicago P.D. . She is a runaway prostitute who eventually becomes the Intelligence Department's secretary, Nadia. Her character was killed off on a Chicago P.D. episode aired in April 2015 titled "The Number of Rats", during a crossover event with Law & Order: Special Victims Unit and Chicago Fire.

From 2015 to 2020, she starred as Julia Wicker in the Syfy series, The Magicians. In 2019, she was featured in an episode of the drama, God Friended Me.

=== Music video ===
Maeve appeared in the 2014 music video, "Figure It Out", by Royal Blood.

== Personal life ==
In a May 2019 Instagram post, Maeve confirmed her engagement to actor Benjamin Wadsworth after a year of dating. They have one daughter. As of 2025, Maeve is no longer dating Wadsworth.

== Filmography ==
=== Film ===
Year	Title	Role	Notes
2005	Liminality	Kat	Short film
2005	Transamerica	Taylor	
2006	Euthanasia	Becky	Short film
2007	Remember the Daze	Lighty	
2008	Harold	Shelly Clemens	
2009	Brooklyn's Finest	Cynthia	
2009	Asylum Seekers	Alice	
2010	The Runaways	Sandy West	
2012	Cloned: The Recreator Chronicles	Tracy Bernstein / Tracy 2	
2012	Starlet	Melissa	
2013	All Together Now	Rachel	
2014	Buttwhistle	Missy Blancmange	
2014	The Park Bench	Maribel	
2015	Dark Summer	Abby Feller	
2015	Flipped	Nicole Diamond	Also Stunt
2016	Long Nights Short Mornings	Lily	
2017	Take the 10	Brooke	
2020	Bite Size Halloween episode "Old Maid" (season 1, episode 23)	Cat (The Bride)	Short Film

=== Television ===
Year	Title	Role	Notes
2005	Law & Order: Criminal Intent	Sylvie Skoller / Gloria Barton	Episodes: "No Exit", "False-Hearted Judges"
2005	Law & Order	Alexis Henderson	Episode: "Acid"
2006	Law & Order: Special Victims Unit	Leslie Sweeney	Episode: "Influence"
2007	The Bronx Is Burning	Joanne Lomino	Episode: "The Straw"
2008–09	Gossip Girl	Emma Boardman	Episodes: "There Might be Blood", "The Goodbye Gossip Girl"
2009	CSI: Crime Scene Investigation	Marnie Bennett	Episode: "Ghost Town"
2009	Accused at 17	Sarah Patterson	Television film
2010	My Super Psycho Sweet 16: Part 2	Zoe Chandler	Television film
2010–11	House	Kenzie	2 episodes
2010	Bones	Amber Flaire	Episode: "The Twisted Bones in the Melted Truck"
2011	Funny or Die Presents...	Ann	Episode: "#2.9"; segment "Jeff Baker: Jr. College Professor"
2012	Grey's Anatomy	Lily	Episode: "Suddenly"
2013	Golden Boy	Agnes Clark	Main role; 13 episodes
2014–15	Chicago P.D.	Nadia Decotis	Recurring role; 18 episodes
2014	Rizzoli & Isles	Kelsey	Episode: "Just Push Play"
2015–16	Law & Order: Special Victims Unit	Nadia Decotis	3 episodes
2015–20	The Magicians	Julia Wicker	Main role; 65 episodes
2019	God Friended Me	Sophia	Episode: "Scenes from an Italian Restaurant"
2022–2023	Mayans M.C.	Kody / Katie McNeil	12 episodes
