= Wild River (Alaska) =

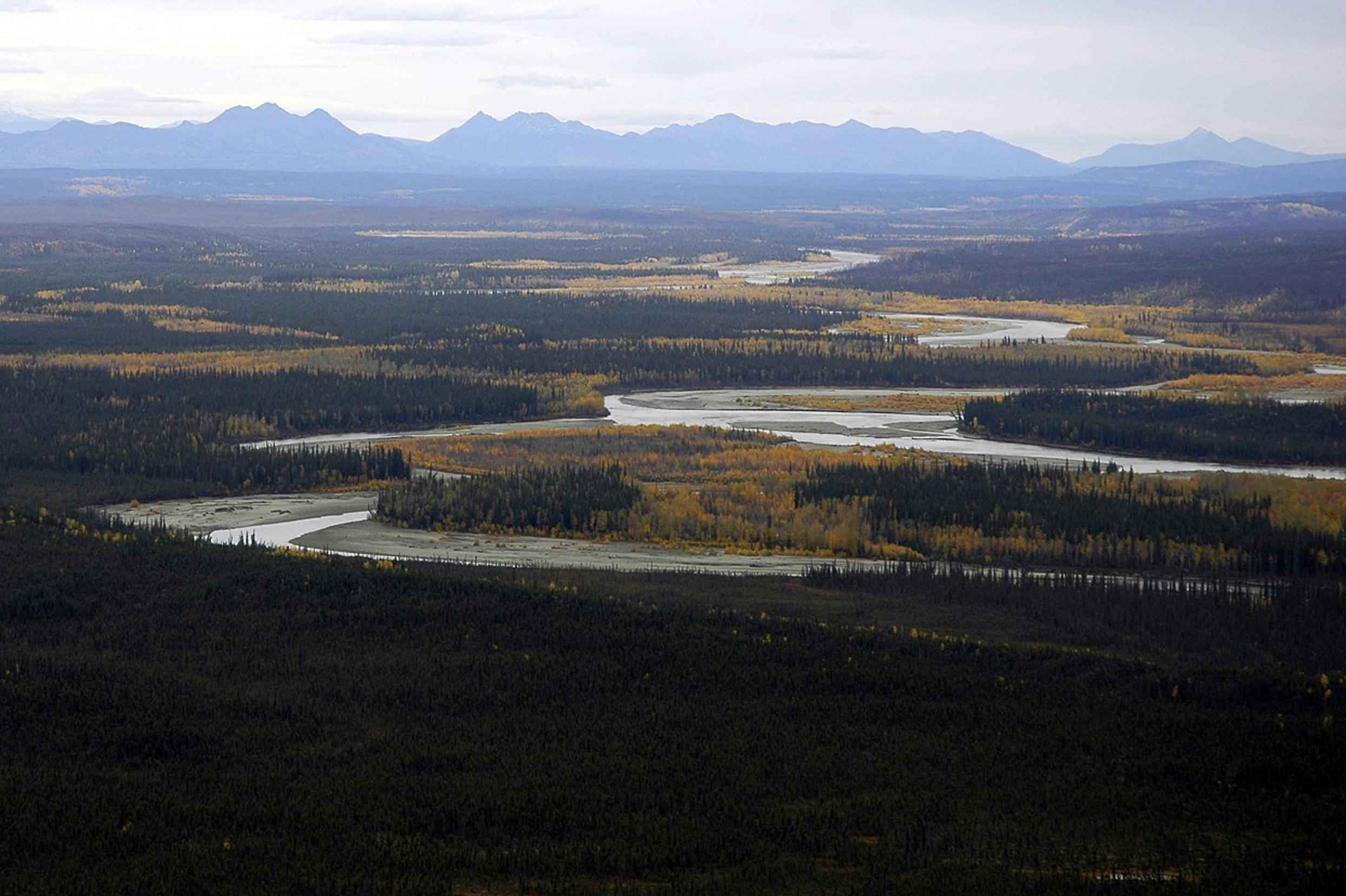

- Location of the mouth of the Wild River in Alaska

Location
- Country: United States
- state: Alaska

Physical characteristics
- Source: Wild Lake
  - location: Alaska
- Mouth: Koyukuk River
  - location: 6 miles (9.7 km) northeast of Bettles, Yukon–Koyukuk, Alaska
  - coordinates: 66°57′06″N 151°28′14″W
  - elevation: 630 ft (190 m)
- Length: 63 mi (101 km)

The Wild River is a river, about 63 miles (101 km) long, in the U.S. state of Alaska whose headwaters are found in Wild Lake at the foot of Tobin Mountain with a mouth emptying into the Koyukuk River near Bettles, Alaska. The river flows through the southern edge of the Brooks Range and out into the plains of the Yukon River System of north central Alaska and the Kanuti Flats.

Major tributaries of Wild River include Chicken Creek, located opposite Death Valley, Death Valley Creek which flows through the before mentioned valley, Michigan Creek, Gilroy Creek, which runs off Gilroy Mountain, Flat Creek and Schofield Creek.

Other populated areas near Wild River are Evansville, located next to Bettles, Wiseman and Coldfoot, both located on the Dalton Highway about 40 miles east of the river.

The name of the river was obtained by Lieutenant Commander Allen, USA, and was reported in 1899 by F.C. Shrader, U.S. Geological Survey (USGS). It may have been taken from the Koyukuk Native name most often spelled "Totsenbetna".

Robert Marshall thoroughly explored the river and its tributaries in 1931 for the United States Department of the Interior. His exploration included mapping the river system, geological structures in the area and conducting mineral resource studies. During the first half of 20th century there was extensive mining on the river and tributaries as a result of the Klondike Gold Rush and subsequently the finding of gold on Jay Creek, a tributary of the Wild.

== See also ==
- List of rivers of Alaska
- Gates of the Arctic National Park and Preserve
