= PeterFever =

American pornographic film studio

- Type: Subsidiary
- Industry: Gay pornography
- Genre: Pornography
- Founded: 2008; 18 years ago
- Founder: Peter Le
- Headquarters: California, U.S.
- Website: https://www.peterfever.com/

PeterFever is an American gay pornographic film studio founded in 2008 by Peter Le. It has been described as a pioneer in Asian American representation in the gay pornography industry due to its focus on muscular models of Asian background.

== History ==
Vietnamese American founder Peter Le first rose to prominence in the gay pornography industry in 2001 through his modeling work for the American magazine Playgirl. In 2008, Le created his own pornographic website with the intent of representing muscular Asian men, in opposition to stereotypes of East Asian men in the United States as emasculated men.

PeterFever gained recognition in the 2010s, winning a Cybersocket Web Award in 2011 and frequently being nominated for Gay Site of the Year at the XBIZ Awards. Le and Chinese PeterFever model Eric East were described as among the most globally well-known Asian gay pornographic models of their time, building sizable fan bases in China and being selected as ambassadors for a HIV/AIDS awareness campaign for Singaporean magazine Element Magazine in 2015. In 2014, PeterFever partnered with ShanghaiPride.

In 2017, Le retired from the pornography industry and sold PeterFever to ZBuckz, owner of various Asian gay pornography websites such as JapanBoyz. In 2023, PeterFever collaborated with JustFor.Fans, an Internet content paid subscription service, to implement a content creator initiative program.

== Impact ==
Due to laws regarding pornography in Asia, the majority of gay pornography focused on Asian models prior to PeterFever was strictly censored and amateurish-quality pornography from Japan. Gay Korean American comedian and writer Joel Kim Booster described PeterFever and Tumblr as two of the few early platforms in which positive Asian representation in gay pornography could be found.

== Selected films ==
- The Asiancy (2012)
- Deuce (2017)
- The Black Panda (2018)
- Gayvengers (2018)
- Sexy Rich Gaysians (2018)

== Awards and nominations ==
Award ceremony	Year	Nomination	Result	Ref.
Cybersocket Web Awards	2011	Best Asian-Themed Site	Won	
Cybersocket Web Awards	2018	Best Asian-Themed Site	Won	
Cybersocket Web Awards	2019	Best Asian-Themed Site	Won	
Cybersocket Web Awards	2019	Best Mobile Content Site	Nominated	
Cybersocket Web Awards	2019	Best Video Site	Nominated	
Cybersocket Web Awards	2019	Best VOD Site	Nominated	
Cybersocket Web Awards	2020	Best Asian-Themed Site	Won	

== See also ==
- List of male actors in gay pornographic films
- List of pornographic film studios
