= Paul Solet =

American film director

Paul Solet (born June 13, 1979) is an American film director, film producer, writer and actor.

== Early life ==
Paul Solet was born in Cambridge, Massachusetts, and attended Cambridge Rindge and Latin School class of 1998.

Solet attended Emerson College and received a BA in Film and Psychology in 2002 as well as a screenwriting certificate in 2003.

== Film career ==
After receiving a BA in Film and Psychology from Emerson College in 2002, and a certificate in screenwriting from the same school in 2003, Solet went to work collaborating on a feature-length script with his longtime mentor, Eli Roth (Cabin Fever, Hostel), while continuing to write and direct his own material.

Solet's 2005 short, Means to an End, was awarded Best Short Horror Film from the genre's number one authority, Fangoria. Means to an End ended up on Fangoria's prestigious Blood Drive 2 DVD. Means to an End also won Best Short Film and the Audience Choice Award at the 2005 Rhode Island International Film Festival, and Best Extreme Horror Film at the 2005 Dragon Con International Film Festival. Solet's next short film, Grace, screened at dozens of festivals, won Best Short Film at the 2006 Rhode Island International Film Festival, the Peer's Choice Award at Dragon Con 2006, and became the first independent film to screen on Fangoria TV.

Solet has received equal praise for his work as a screenwriter. His body-horror script, Repeater, came in Second Place in Hollywood 's First Glance Film Festival, was a Quarter Finalist in the 2006 Screenwriting Expo, and a Finalist in New York 's VisionFest 2006 Screenwriting Contest. His feature length thriller Heartland won Third Place at VisionFest 2005, was a Quarter Finalist in the 2005 Horror Screenplay Contest, finished in the top 25% at the 2006 Screenwriting Expo, and was a Quarter Finalist at the 2006 American Screenwriter's Association Contest.

Editor of Fangoria magazine, Tony Timpone, has called Solet, "A horror talent to watch", Rue Morgue magazine has said, "Solet is undoubtedly destined to become a household name in the genre", and Eli Roth has said Solet's work, "Makes Cabin Fever look like a Disney movie…."

=== Grace ===
In May 2008 Paul wrapped production on the feature-length version of Grace, from which his much-lauded short film was distilled. Since its premiere at Sundance 2009, where two men in the audience passed out from the intensity of the film, Grace has played at festivals all over the world including SXSW, Brussels, and Gérardmer, where it won the prestigious Prix du Jury. It will play another 6 major international film festivals over the next two months, and many more in the months to follow. The film eventually received a limited theatrical release on August 14, 2009.

=== Other projects ===
Paul starred in filmmaker Adam Green's "Jack Chop" video. "Jack Chop" is a short film spoofing the "Slap Chop" infomercial. He also directed 2014 the psycho-thriller Dark Summer. He was also a director of the Anthology film Tales of Halloween.

== Filmography ==
| Year | Title | Director | Producer | Writer |
|---|---|---|---|---|
| 2005 | Means To An End | Yes | Yes | Yes |
| 2005 | Fangoria: Blood Drive II | Yes | No | No |
| 2006 | Grace (Short Film) | Yes | Yes | Yes |
| 2009 | Grace | Yes | Yes | Yes |
| 2015 | Dark Summer | Yes | Yes | Yes |
| 2015 | Tales of Halloween - Segment: The Weak and the Wicked | Yes | Yes | Yes |
| 2017 | Bullet Head | Yes | Yes | Yes |
| 2019 | Tread | Yes | Yes | Yes |
| 2021 | Clean | Yes | Yes | Yes |
| 2023 | Chowchilla | Yes | Yes | Yes |

Acting roles

| Year | Title | Role |
|---|---|---|
| 2005 | Means To An End | Skinny Guy |
| 2009 | The Tivo | Guy On Phone |
| 2009 | The Jack Chop | Nicolo (Jack Chop Guy) |

== Miscellaneous ==
Paul recently received internet attention due to Eli Roth sharing his Jack Chop video.

Due to his love of Strawberry Nesquik his new fans are affectionately referred to as strawberries.
