= Keir Gilchrist =

Canadian actor (born 1992)

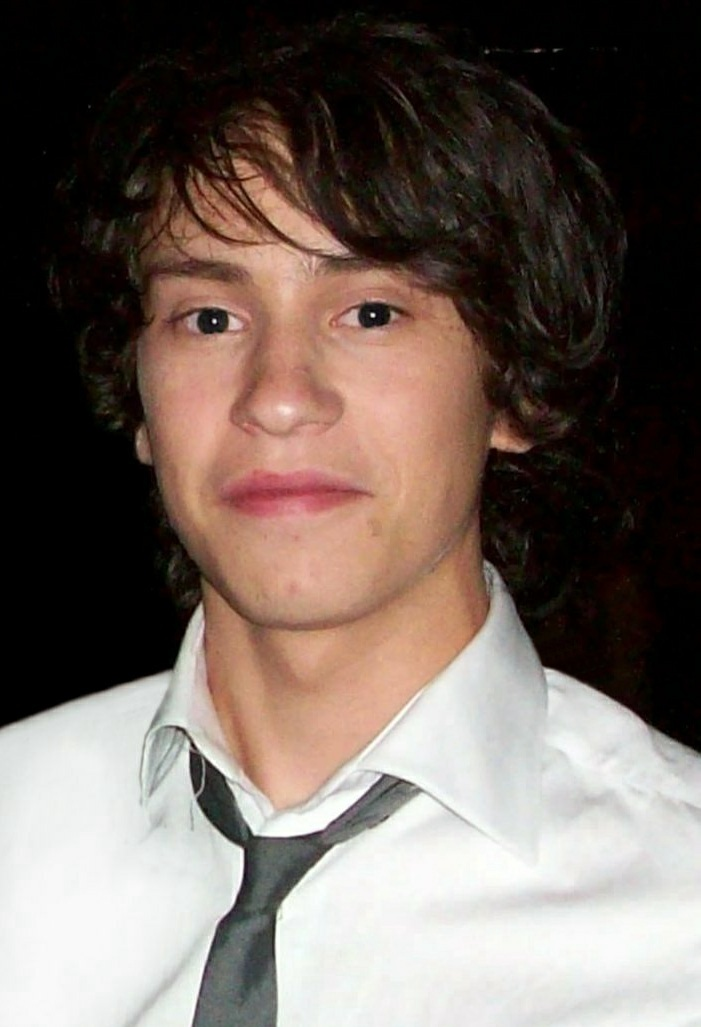
- Gilchrist at the 2010 Toronto International Film Festival
- Born: Keir David Peters Gilchrist; 28 September 1992 (age 34); Camden, London, England
- Occupation: Actor
- Years active: 2003–present
- Relatives: Douglas Peters (maternal grandfather)

Keir David Peters Gilchrist (/ˈkɪər ˈɡɪlkrɪst/; born 28 September 1992) is a Canadian actor. On television, he portrayed Marshall Gregson on the Showtime comedy-drama United States of Tara (2009–2011) and the headlining role of Sam Gardner on the Netflix comedy-drama Atypical (2017–2021). His film roles include the comedy-drama It's Kind of a Funny Story (2010) and the supernatural horror It Follows (2014). Outside of his acting career, Gilchrist is the vocalist of grindcore band Whelm and death metal band Phalanx.

== Early life ==
Gilchrist was born in Camden Town, London, to Canadian parents Catherine (née Peters) and Ian Gilchrist. His maternal grandfather was banker, economist, and politician Douglas Peters, and his uncle is economist David Wilfrid Peters. Gilchrist spent his early years in London, before relocating to Boston, Massachusetts, United States, during his childhood, then to New York City, before finally settling in Toronto, Ontario, Canada.

== Career ==
Gilchrist attended the Annex Children's Theatre. Gilchrist's first significant television role was that of Josh McKellar on Fox's short-lived television sitcom The Winner, which aired in 2007. From 2009 until its ending in 2011, Gilchrist co-starred as Marshall Gregson, the son of the lead character, on the Showtime comedy-drama series United States of Tara.

In 2009, Gilchrist won the lead role of Craig Gilner in the film It's Kind of a Funny Story, which premiered at the Sundance Film Festival in January 2010.

In 2014, Gilchrist co-starred in the film It Follows.

In 2015, he played the lead role of Daniel Austin in the film Dark Summer, starred as John Lovett in The Stanford Prison Experiment and William in Len and Company, and had a role in the short drama film Share.

In 2016, he co-starred in the film The Good Neighbor.

In 2017, he starred in the film Heartthrob as Henry, directed by Chris Sivertson. In August of that year, he starred as Sam Gardner, a teen on the autism spectrum who is ready to have a girlfriend, in the Netflix comedy-drama Atypical. He continued with the role for four seasons until the show concluded on 9 July 2021.

== Filmography ==
Key
†	Denotes works that have not yet been released

=== Film ===
Year	Title	Role	Notes
2004	The Right Way	Young David	
2004	The Sadness of Johnson Joe Jangles	Clint the Boy Doctor	
2005	Horsie's Retreat	Louie	
2005	The Waldo Cumberbund Story	Young Waldo	
2006	A Lobster Tale	Mike Stanton	
2007	Dead Silence	Young Henry	
2008	The Rocker	Moby type kid	
2009	Just Peck	Michael Peck	
2009	Hungry Hills	Snit Mandolin	
2010	It's Kind of a Funny Story	Craig Gilner	
2011	Matty Hanson and the Invisibility Ray	Matty Hanson	
2013	Seasick Sailor	Penna	Short film
2014	It Follows	Paul Bolduan	
2015	Dark Summer	Daniel Austin	
2015	The Stanford Prison Experiment	John Lovett	
2015	Share	Dylan	Short film
2015	The Heyday of the Insensitive Bastards	Michael	
2015	Len and Company	William	
2015	Tales of Halloween	The Stranger	Segment: "The Weak and the Wicked"
2016	The Good Neighbor	Sean Turner	
2016	Katie Says Goodbye	Matty	
2017	Heartthrob	Henry Sinclair	
2019	Castle in the Ground	Polo boy	
2020	Flashback	Andre	
2021	An Intrusion	Layne	
2023	The Featherweight	Billy Papaleo Jr.	
2024	Freaky Tales	Josh	
2024	Running on Empty	Mort	
2025	By Design	Gary	

=== Television ===
Year	Title	Role	Notes
2003	Queer as Folk	Jim Stockwell Jr.	Episode: "#3.9"
2004	Doc	R. J. Mitchell	Episode: "The Last Ride"
2004	Samantha: An American Girl Holiday	Factory boy	Television film
2005	1-800-Missing	Danny Sheperd	Episode: "Unnatural Disaster"
2006	Miss Spider's Sunny Patch Friends	Squidge	Episode: "Giddy Up Bugs/A Plushy Parable"
2006	ReGenesis	10-year-old boy	Episode: "The Wild and the Innocent"
2007	Family Guy	Kyle (voice)	Episode: "The Tan Aquatic with Steve Zissou"
2007	The Winner	Josh McKellar	Main role
2007	Life with Derek	Jamie	3 episodes
2009	The Listener	Daniel / Lisa	Episode: "Lisa Says"
2009–2011	United States of Tara	Marshall Gregson	Main role
2012–2013	Delete	Daniel Gerson	2 episodes
2013	Family Guy	Toby (voice)	Episode: "Valentine's Day in Quahog"
2013	Newsreaders	Ben Hayflack	Episode: "31-Up"
2014	Sea of Fire	Rudy McAllister	Unsold pilot
2017–2021	Atypical	Sam Gardner	Main role
2017	Room 104	Alex	Episode 10: "Red Tent"
2023	Love & Death	Ron Adams	Miniseries
2025	The Walking Dead: Dead City	Benjamin Pierce	Main role

=== Music videos ===
Year	Artist	Song	Notes
2016	Gatecreeper	"Desperation"	One of the two characters
2016	The Body	"The Myth Arc"	
