= Heartthrob (film) =

2017 American thriller film

- Directed by: Chris Sivertson
- Written by: Chris Sivertson
- Produced by: Aimée Flaherty; John Hermann; Michael Moran; Mark Myers
- Starring: Aubrey Peeples; Keir Gilchrist
- Cinematography: Greg Ephraim
- Edited by: Ben La Marca
- Music by: Jim Dooley
- Production company: Citizen Skull Productions
- Release date: June 27, 2017
- Running time: 86 minutes
- Country: United States
- Language: English

Heartthrob is a 2017 American thriller film written and directed by Chris Sivertson. It stars Keir Gilchrist as Henry and Aubrey Peeples as Samantha, who form a relationship after a chance meeting. However, things go downhill as Henry's infatuation with Samantha turns dark.

== Plot ==
Shortly after high school graduation, Henry (Keir Gilchrist), the shy valedictorian, encounters Samantha (Aubrey Peeples), who suffers from a reputation as a bimbo at school.

They argue at first about their preconceptions of each other, but later Henry apologizes and offers Samantha a ride home when her shift at work ends. He is overjoyed to find romance with her, but is incensed by the knowledge of her past relations with others and kills one of her former lovers.

Henry is accepted to MIT, the university of choice of his domineering mother, but he drops out to stay in town with Samantha, who has been warned about his obsessive behavior. She breaks up with him to allow him to attend the better university.

Henry is convinced she is being pressured into leaving him and targets those he believes responsible. He kills her close friend Dustin and then proceeds to call Samantha and tell her that he worked things out with MIT, and invites her to his house to celebrate.

While eating a homemade dinner there, she hears a thumping from an upstairs bedroom and discovers Henry's mother tied to a chair. Henry pulls out a knife and offers to either release his mother or kill her to solve their relationship problems, admitting that he was responsible for Dustin's death.

Samantha convinces him to release his mother, who escapes out his bedroom window and runs from the house screaming for help. Henry begs Samantha to run away with him but she refuses. Realizing that Samantha is different in the way that she does not need anyone, and also content with the fact that she loved him, he says one final "I love you" and stabs himself in the chest, dying immediately.

Two days after his death, Samantha receives Henry's journal in the mail. She decides to keep it a secret and thinks back to all the time they spent together. Her shrink says that the relationship was unhealthy, and even though she accepts it, she knows that Henry truly loved her and saw her differently than everyone else.

The movie ends with Samantha sitting on the floor of the skating rink, where Henry took her on their first date. She then says, "I love you, Henry," which she deeply regrets not telling him when he was alive.

== Cast ==
- Aubrey Peeples as Sam Maddox
- Keir Gilchrist as Henry Sinclair
- Peter Facinelli as Mr. Rickett
- Jimmy Bennett as Dustin
- Taylor Dearden as Cleo
- Ione Skye as Jody
- Felicity Price as Colette
- Tristan Decker as Bailey
- Connor Muhl as Flynn
- Rebecca Huey as Tina
- Caroline Huey as Tasha
- Daniel Nsengimana as Josh
- Austin Kulman as Brendan
- Reza Leal-Smartt as Audrey Bellwether
- Ian Bond as Danny
- Echo Bull as Mrs. Tachuk
- Lowell Deo as Mr. Tachuk
- Aaron Ross as DJ
- Nazlah Black as Rhoda
- Skyler Verity as Guitar Dude
- Thom Delahunt as Diner Patron
- Giovanni V. Giusti as Firekeeper

== Production ==
Filming took place in Tacoma, Washington.

== Release ==
The film had a limited release in the United States on June 27, 2017.
