= The River Wild =

1994 film by Curtis Hanson

- Theatrical release poster
- Directed by: Curtis Hanson
- Written by: Denis O'Neill
- Produced by: David Foster; Lawrence Turman
- Starring: Meryl Streep; Kevin Bacon; David Strathairn; Joseph Mazzello; John C. Reilly
- Cinematography: Robert Elswit
- Edited by: Joe Hutshing; David Brenner
- Music by: Jerry Goldsmith
- Production company: Turman-Foster Company
- Distributed by: Universal Pictures
- Release date: September 30, 1994
- Running time: 111 minutes
- Country: United States
- Languages: English; American Sign Language
- Budget: $45 million
- Box office: $94.2 million

The River Wild is a 1994 American thriller film starring Meryl Streep, Kevin Bacon, and David Strathairn. It was directed by Curtis Hanson, and written by Denis O'Neill. It follows a young family whose white-water rafting holiday is endangered when they are taken hostage by a pair of armed fugitives.

The film was theatrically released in the United States on September 30, 1994, by Universal Pictures. Streep was nominated for a Golden Globe Award and a Screen Actors Guild Award for her performance, while Bacon received a Golden Globe nomination for his performance.

== Plot ==
A Boston couple, Gail and Tom Hartman, are having marital problems, mostly due to Tom, an architect, spending so much time working. Gail, a history teacher and former river guide, is taking their son, Roarke, on a rafting trip down the Salmon River in Idaho, along with their dog, Maggie. Their daughter, Willa, is staying behind with Gail's parents in Idaho. Tom, who had remained in Boston, unexpectedly joins them at the last minute. As they are setting off, they meet three other rafters, Wade, Terry, and Frank, who appear to be friendly.

The Hartmans catch up with the trio during a day break, and notice that Frank is no longer with Wade and Terry. They explain that he hiked out after an argument. Unfortunately, he was their guide, and Wade and Terry lack any rafting experience. Gail offers to guide them down the rest of the river. Before getting back on the water, Maggie wanders off and becomes curious about something in the brush farther up the canyon. Tom fetches her before she uncovers it, and they return to the raft.

After a day's rafting, they make camp for the night, but Tom continues working on his architectural project, disappointing Roarke, who feels neglected. They are joined by Wade and Terry, who help celebrate Roarke's birthday that night. After Wade begins acting suspiciously, Gail agrees with Tom that they should part ways with him and Terry. Their plans are upended when Wade and Terry shove off first with Roarke aboard their raft. Wade, showing off to Roarke, reveals they have a gun. During a rest stop, Gail and Tom attempt to take off with Roarke before Wade and Terry notice. That fails, and Wade pulls the gun on Tom. As they struggle, Maggie runs off into the bushes. Gail then realizes that Wade and Terry committed a recently reported robbery and have killed Frank, who was wounded during the robbery and was slowing them down.

The Hartmans are forced down the river at gunpoint before setting up camp for the night. During the night, Tom tries and fails to wrestle the gun away from Terry. Tom runs into the river with Wade chasing him. Wade shoots at Tom and appears to have hit him. Wade returns telling Gail and Roarke that Tom is dead. It is then revealed that Wade's gunshot had missed Tom, and he had escaped. The next day they run into a ranger, Johnny, who knows that Gail intends to run the Gauntlet, and warns her not to try. Wade shoots him and throws his body into the rapids.

Unbeknownst to anyone, Tom, who finds Maggie, is racing on foot along the canyon rim to get ahead of the raft. After a harrowing ride, the group makes it through the Gauntlet. Tom reappears, and flips the raft. As he struggles with Terry, Gail is able to get the gun. She shoots and kills Wade while Tom subdues Terry. A helicopter with rangers aboard arrives, and they arrest Terry. Gail and Tom share a kiss by the rapids. The film ends with the Hartmans in embrace.

== Cast ==
- Meryl Streep as Gail Hartman
- Kevin Bacon as Wade
- David Strathairn as Tom Hartman
- Joseph Mazzello as Roarke Hartman
- John C. Reilly as Terry
- Benjamin Bratt as Ranger Johnny
- Elizabeth Hoffman as Gail's Mother
- Victor H. Galloway as Gail's Father
- Diane Delano as Ranger
- Thomas F. Duffy as Ranger
- William Lucking as Frank
- Paul Cantelon as Violinist
- Glenn Morshower as Policeman
- Stephanie Sawyer as Willa Hartman

== Pre-production and filming ==
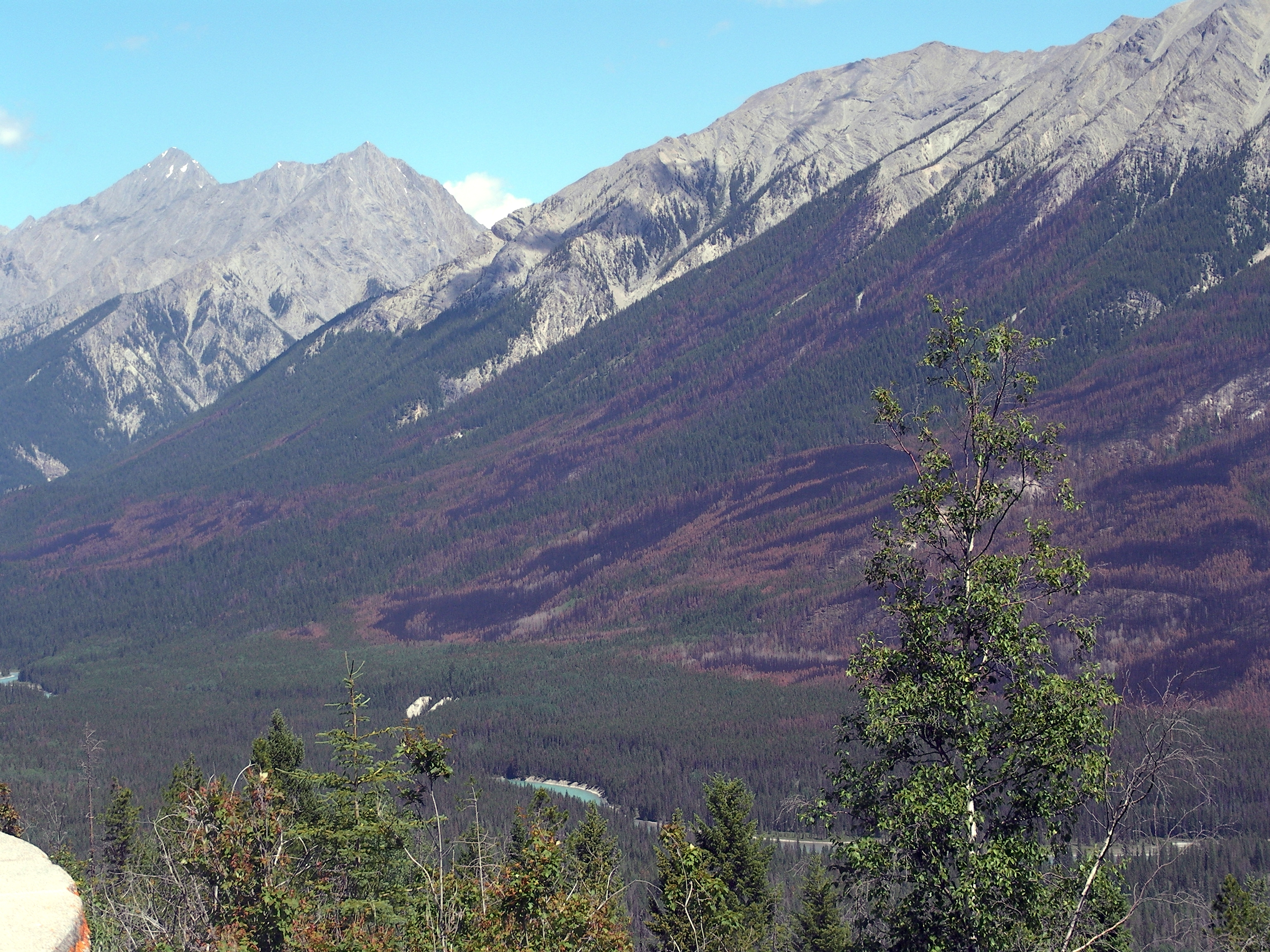
Kootenai River valley used in the film

In June 1993, Universal Studios began considering locations along the Middle Fork of the Flathead River and the Kootenai River in Montana. They also began to seek permits from the forest service and permission from private landowners to film near the falls and nearby West Glacier. Other than Montana for locations, the studio then began to scout the areas in Washington, Oregon, Idaho and Wyoming. Before filming began, the crew spent two weeks doing research and development on whitewater rafting.

Principal photography began on August 4, 1993. Many of the film's whitewater scenes were filmed on the Kootenai River. Other scenes were filmed on the Ruby Horsethief section of the Colorado River, the Rogue River in Southern Oregon, and the Middle Fork of the Flathead River. The locations necessitated specialized whitewater river professionals to perform the river stunts and provide the needed safety for Streep and other cast members. Streep did several of her own stunts in the film on the milder river sections. The major whitewater stunts were performed by expert professional river guide Kelley Kalafatich who was hired as Streep's stunt double for the movie.

There was a scare at the end of one day of filming when Hanson asked Streep to shoot one more scene, to which she objected because of her exhaustion. However, she decided to attempt it, and weak from fatigue, was swept off the raft into the river and was in danger of drowning; she did not drown because of her personal flotation device and the river rescue team. Afterwards she said to Hanson, "In the future, when I say I can't do something, I think you should believe me," to which he agreed.

After filming of the whitewater sequences in Montana and Oregon concluded, the main cast and crew went to Boston, Massachusetts to film the remaining scenes that are shown at the beginning of the film. Production was completed in November 1993.

== Music ==
The film was initially scored by Maurice Jarre, but after the producers threw his work out, Jerry Goldsmith was signed to rescore the project (footage of the Goldsmith scoring sessions was used in the 1995 documentary Film Music Masters: Jerry Goldsmith, with extended footage of same as a DVD bonus). Although Goldsmith took a different approach to that of Jarre, both composers incorporated the folk song "The Water Is Wide" into their scores; the Cowboy Junkies also recorded a version of the song for the end credits. RCA Victor released a soundtrack album on September 13, 1994.

On January 19, 2014, Intrada Records released a limited-edition album, with Goldsmith's score and alternates on disc one and Jarre's unused music on disc two. Tracks in bold also appear on the RCA album, mostly under different names.

== Release ==
The film was initially planned to be released in the summer but Universal decided to delay the release until September 30, 1994, in the United States. It grossed a total of $94,216,343 worldwide, earning $46,816,343 in the United States and Canada and $47,400,000 internationally.

== Reception ==
=== Critical response ===
On the review aggregator website Rotten Tomatoes, 65% of 40 critics' reviews are positive, with an average rating of 6/10. Metacritic, which uses a weighted average, assigned the film a score of 63 out of 100, based on 32 critics, indicating "generally favorable" reviews. Audiences polled by CinemaScore gave the film an average grade of "A-" on an A+ to F scale.

Film critic James Berardinelli praised the production values of the cinematography and score, and the pace of the rafting experience. He also praised Hanson's directing, likening it to The Hand That Rocks the Cradle (1992), stating that Hanson, "could manipulate characters and situations within the comfortable confines of a formula plot", and describing it as a "level of excitement designed to submerge implausibilities and minor gaffes, and a film which "braves the rapids while keeping the viewer afloat amidst its churning waters". He also praised Streep's powerful performance as a female action hero, but described the film overall as "a cut below a white-knuckler".

Roger Ebert of the Chicago Sun Times also said the best elements of the film were its cinematography, which he described as "great looking", and the performances of Bacon and Streep; he described the latter as "putting a lot of humor and intelligence into her character". However, Ebert identified serious flaws in the strength of the plot, remarking that, "movies like this are so predictable in their overall stories that they win or lose with their details...The River Wild was constructed from so many ideas, characters and situations recycled from other movies that all the way down the river I kept thinking: Been there". He emphasized the lack of credibility in the storyline and sheer impossibility of some scenes, particularly involving Strathairn as he outruns the pace of the river, and his scenes with the cliff and his Swiss Army knife.

In 2003, the American Film Institute nominated Gail as a hero from the film for AFI's 100 Years...100 Heroes & Villains.

=== Accolades ===
Year	Award	Category	Recipient	Result	Ref.
1995	52nd Golden Globe Awards	Best Actress in a Motion Picture – Drama	Meryl Streep	Nominated	
1995	52nd Golden Globe Awards	Best Supporting Actor in a Motion Picture	Kevin Bacon	Nominated	
1995	1st Screen Actors Guild Awards	Outstanding Performance by a Female Actor in a Leading Role	Meryl Streep	Nominated	
1995	1st YoungStar Awards	Best Performance by a Young Actor in a Drama Film	Joseph Mazzello	Nominated	

=== Year-end lists ===
- Honorable mention – William Arnold, Seattle Post-Intelligencer
- Honorable mention – David Elliott, The San Diego Union-Tribune
- 6th worst – John Hurley, Staten Island Advance

== Standalone sequel ==
In July 2022, it was revealed that a feature film reimagining had entered production, with principal photography already having commenced in Hungary by that time. Directed by Ben Ketai from a script he co-authored with Mike Nguyen Le, the plot centers around a brother and sister with a strained relationship who go on a whitewater rafting trip with a small group of friends. As the group experiences the adventure together, they start to question the intentions of their childhood friend.

The film stars Leighton Meester, Taran Killam, and Adam Brody as the siblings and their childhood friend, respectively. Produced by Ogden Gavanski, the film is a Universal 1440 Entertainment production and will be distributed by Universal Filmed Entertainment Group. Though it was announced as a remake/reboot by tabloids, the executives of the studio called the movie a "new The River Wild story" in the "universe" of the original indicating that it is a standalone-sequel taking place in a contemporary setting. The official title was revealed to be River Wild, with the movie's trailer and release poster debuting in July 2023. The film was released on digital and on DVD on August 1, 2023.

== See also ==
- List of films featuring the deaf and hard of hearing
